= Sendai =

City in Tōhoku, Japan

Sendai 仙台市
- Prefecture capital and designated city
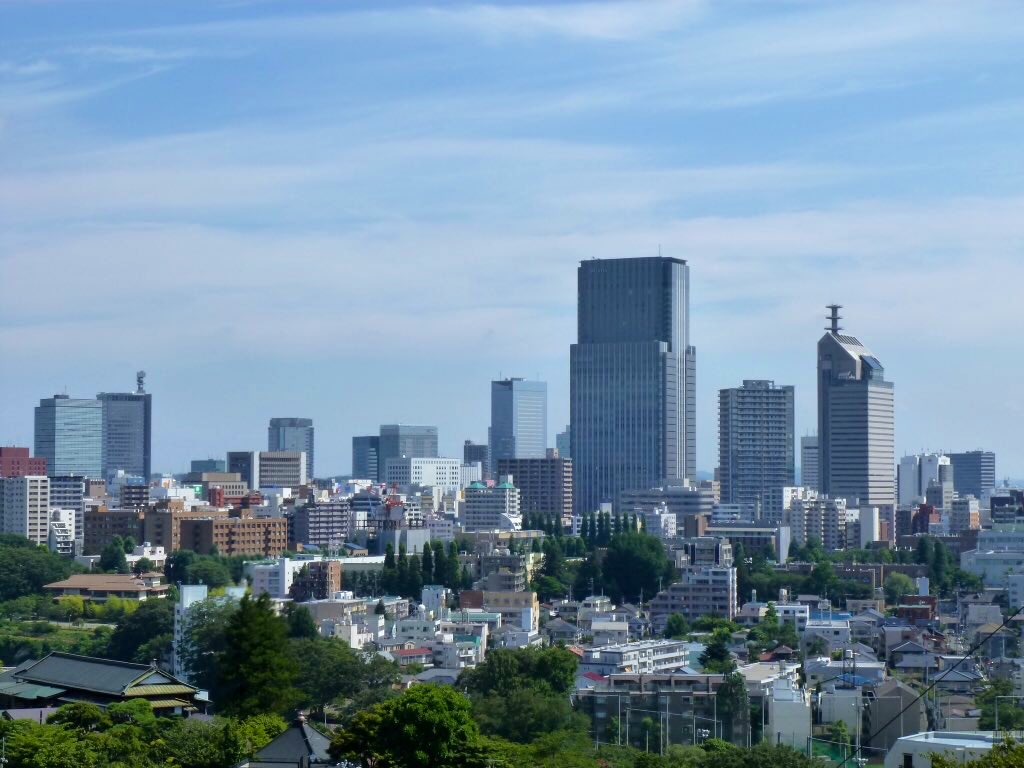
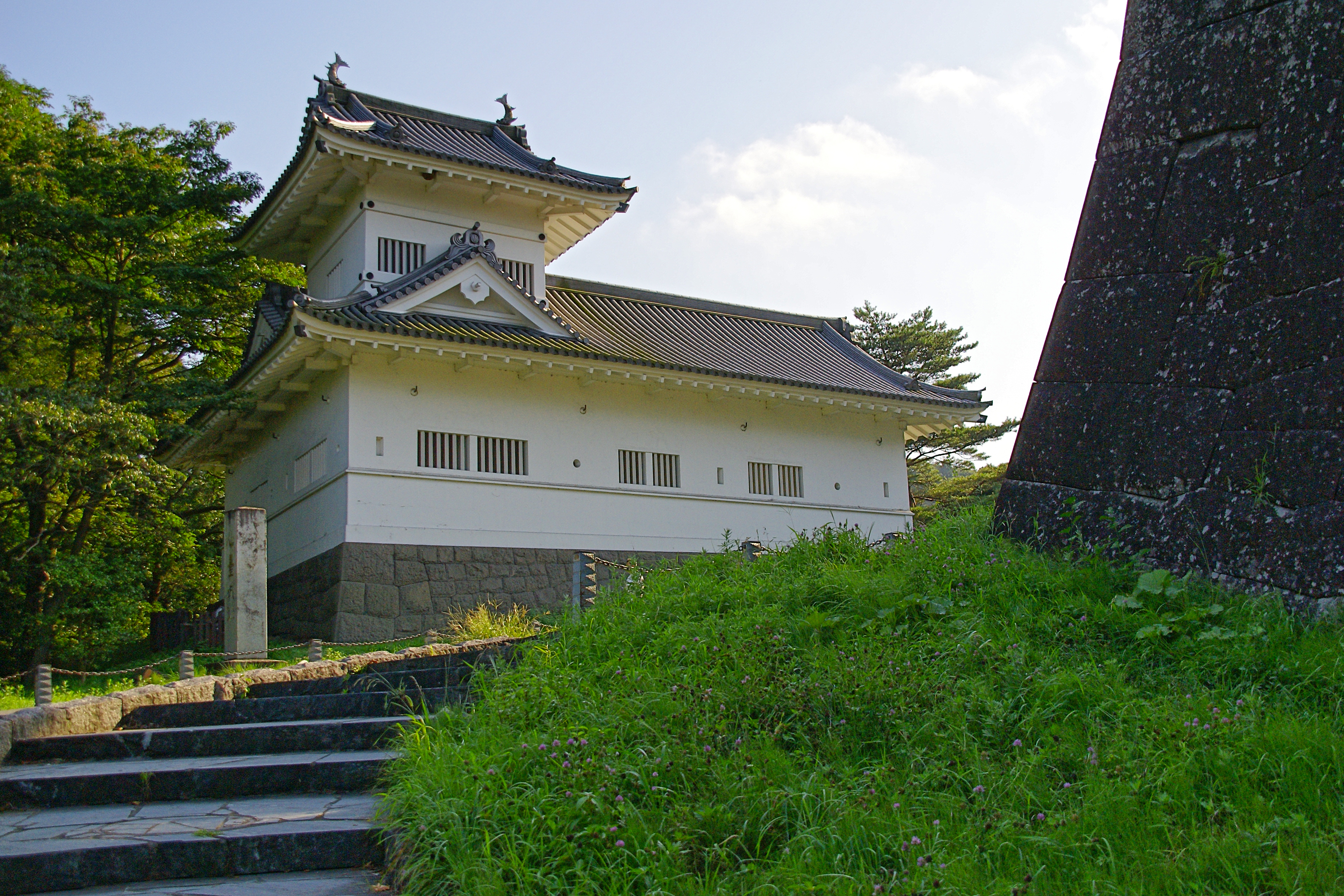
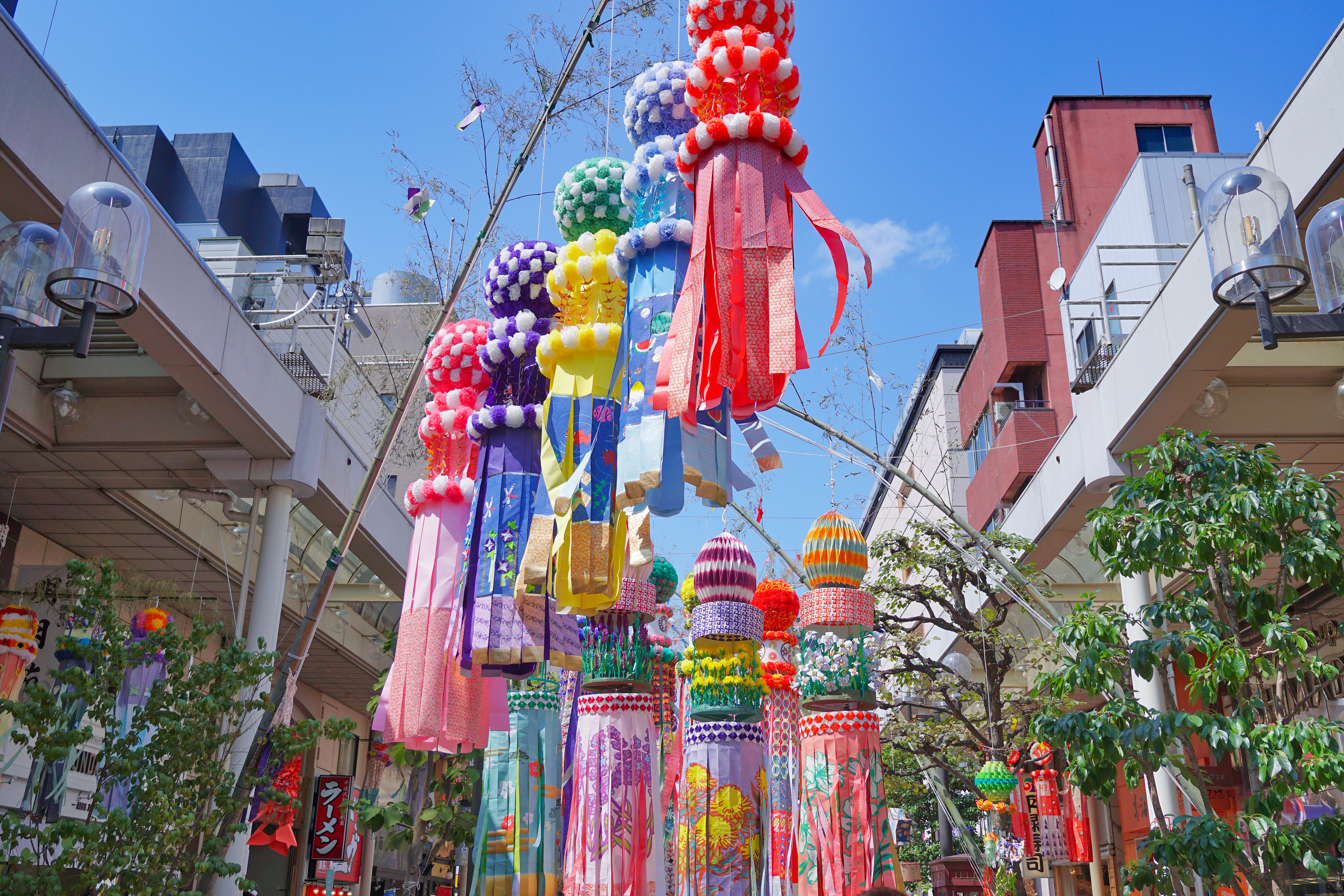
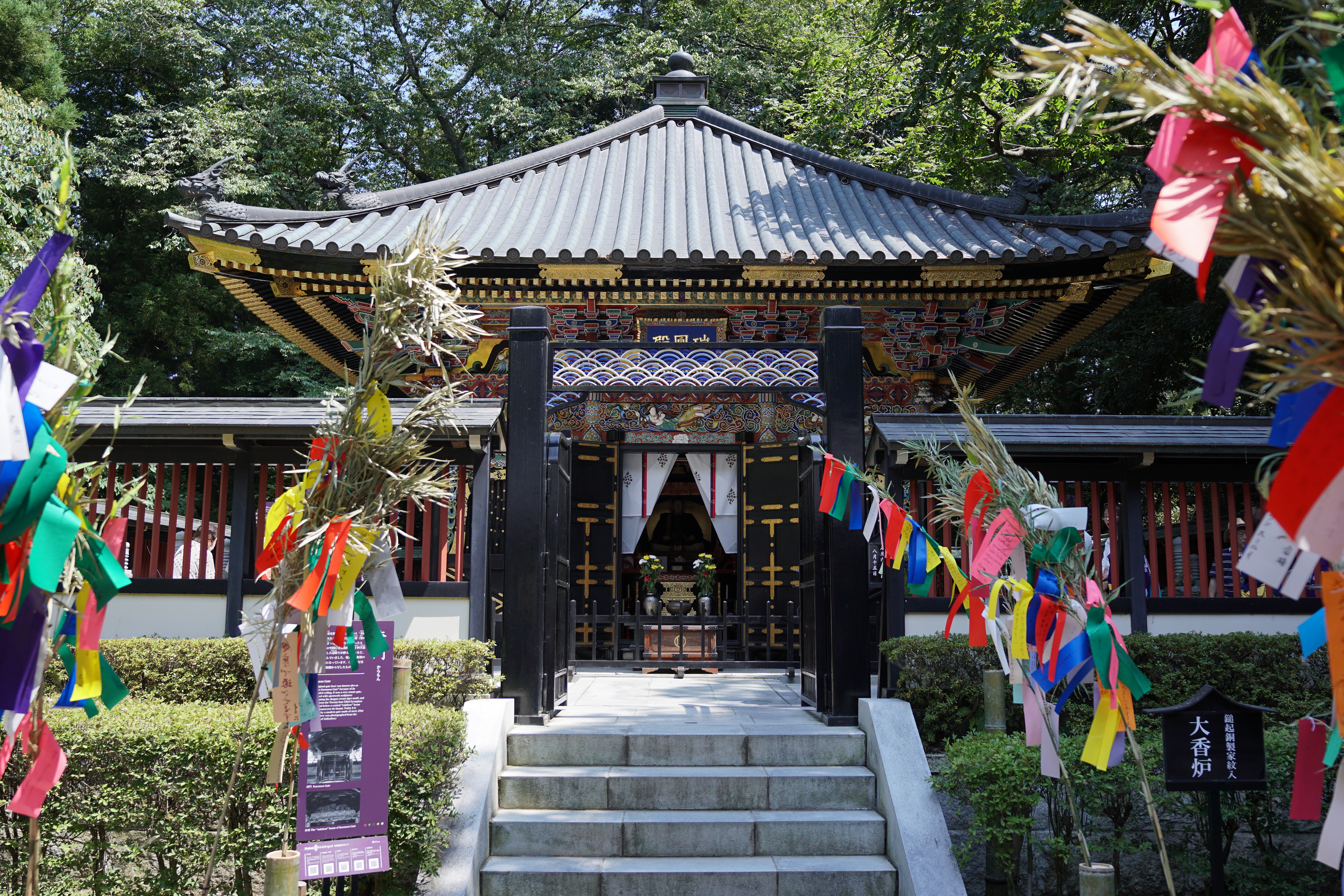
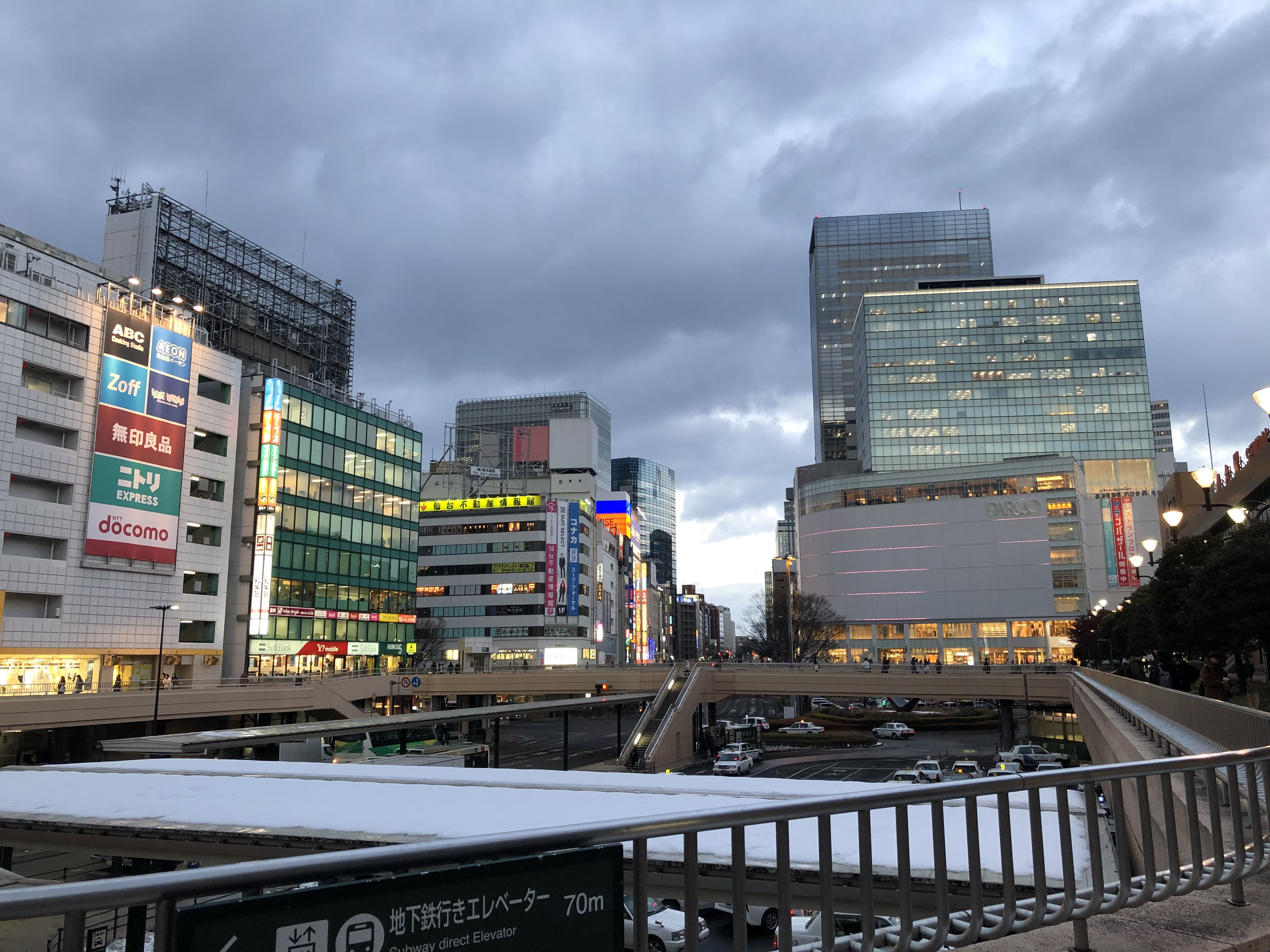
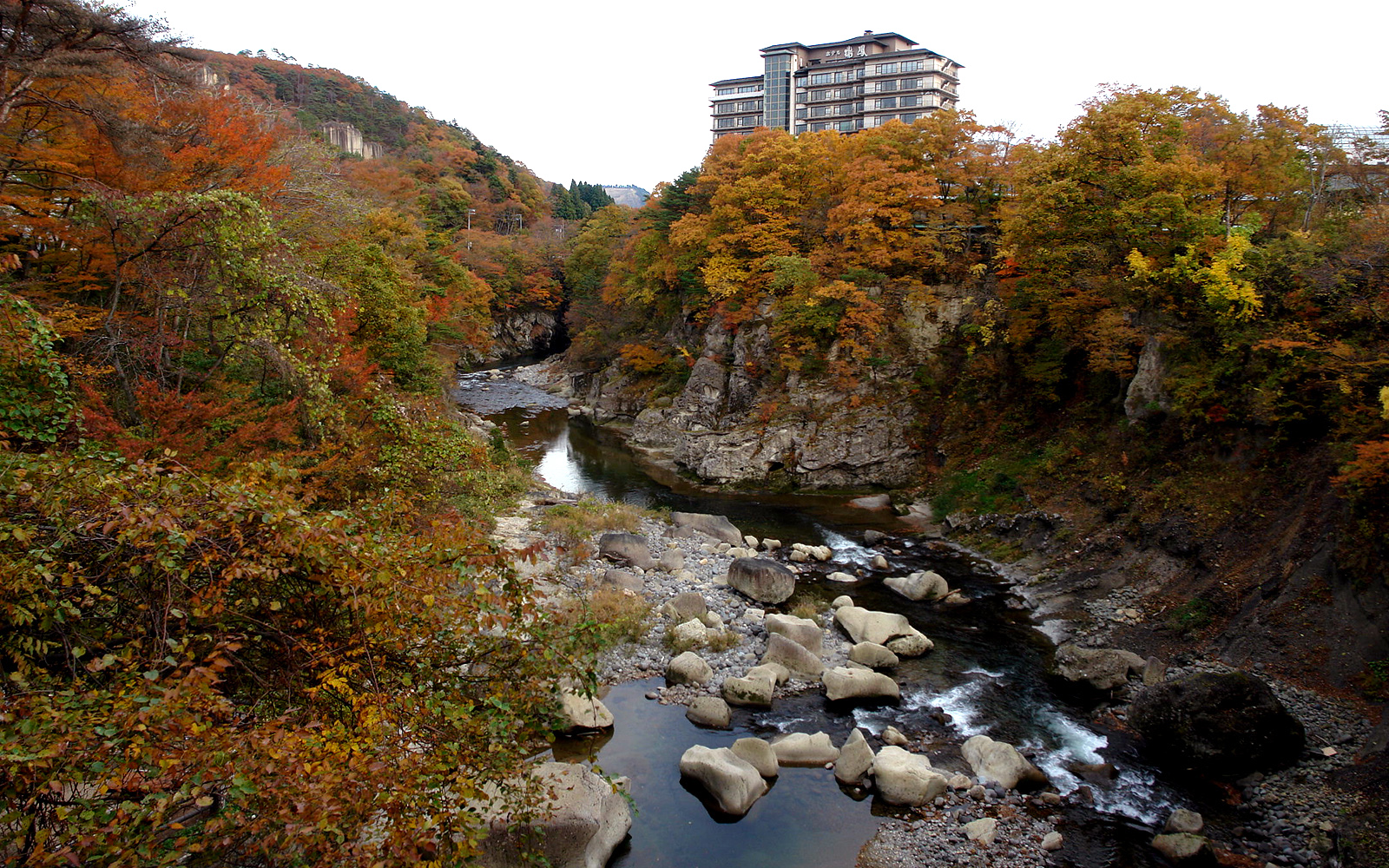
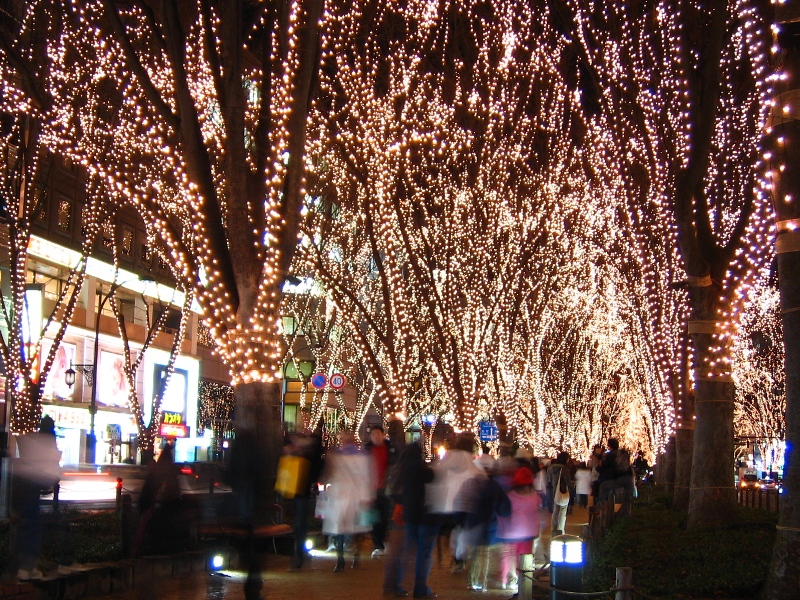
- Skyline of Sendai Aoba Castle Sendai Tanabata Festival in Ichibanchō Zuihōden Mausoleum Sendai Station Akiu Onsen SENDAI Pageant of Starlight

- Flag Seal
- Nickname: City of Trees
- Location of Sendai in Miyagi Prefecture

- Coordinates: 38°16′5.6″N 140°52′9.9″E
- Country: Japan
- Region: Tōhoku
- Prefecture: Miyagi

Government
  - Mayor: Kazuko Kōri

Area
  - Total: 786.30 km^{2} (303.59 sq mi)

Population (August 1, 2023)
  - Total: 1,098,335
  - Density: 1,396.8/km^{2} (3,617.8/sq mi)
- Time zone: UTC+09:00 (Japan Standard Time)
- Symbols
  - Tree: Japanese zelkova
  - Flower: Japanese clover
- Phone number: 022-261-1111
- Address: 3-7-1 Kokubun-cho, Aoba-ku, Sendai-shi, Miyagi-ken 980-8671
- Website: www.city.sendai.jp

Sendai

Japanese name
- Kanji: 仙台
- Hiragana: せんだい
- Katakana: センダイ
Transcriptions
- Romanization: Sendai

Sendai (仙台市, Sendai-shi; [sé̞ǹ.dä̀ì, sè̞ń.dä́ì.ɕì, sé̞ń.dä́ì-]) is the capital city of Miyagi Prefecture and the largest city in the Tōhoku region. As of 1 August 2023, the city had a population of 1,098,335 in 539,698 households, making it the twelfth most populated city in Japan.

The modern city was founded in 1600 by the daimyō Date Masamune. It is nicknamed the City of Trees (杜の都, Mori no Miyako); there are Japanese zelkova trees lining many of the main thoroughfares such as Jōzenji Street (定禅寺通, Jōzenji dōri) and Aoba Street (青葉通, Aoba dōri). In the summer, the Sendai Tanabata Festival, the largest Tanabata festival in Japan, is held. In winter, the trees are decorated with thousands of lights for the Pageant of Starlight (光のページェント, Hikari no pējento), lasting through most of December. The city is also home to Tohoku University, one of the former Imperial Universities. On 11 March 2011, coastal areas of the city suffered catastrophic damage from a magnitude 9.0 offshore earthquake, which triggered a destructive tsunami.

== History ==
=== Edo period ===
Although the Sendai area was inhabited as early as 20,000 years ago, the history of Sendai as a city begins from 1600, when the daimyō Date Masamune relocated. Masamune was not happy with his previous stronghold, Iwadeyama, which was located in the northern portion of his territories and was difficult to access from Edo (modern-day Tokyo). Sendai was an ideal location, being in the centre of Masamune's newly defined territories, upon the major road from Edo. Tokugawa Ieyasu gave Masamune permission to build a new castle in Aobayama after the Battle of Sekigahara. The previous ruler of the Sendai area had used a castle located on Aobayama. At this time Sendai was written as 千代 ("a thousand generations" or "eternity"). Masamune changed the kanji to "仙臺", which later became "仙台" (literally: "hermit/wizard" plus "platform/plateau" or figuratively, "hermit on a platform/high ground"). The character came from a Chinese poem that praised a palace created by the Emperor Wen of Han China (reigned 180–157 BCE), comparing it to a mythical palace in the Kunlun Mountains. Tradition says that Masamune chose this kanji so that the castle would prosper as long as a mountain inhabited by an immortal hermit.

Masamune ordered the construction of Sendai Castle in December 1600 and the construction of the surrounding castle town in 1601. The grid plan roads in modern-day central Sendai are based upon his plans.

Gallery

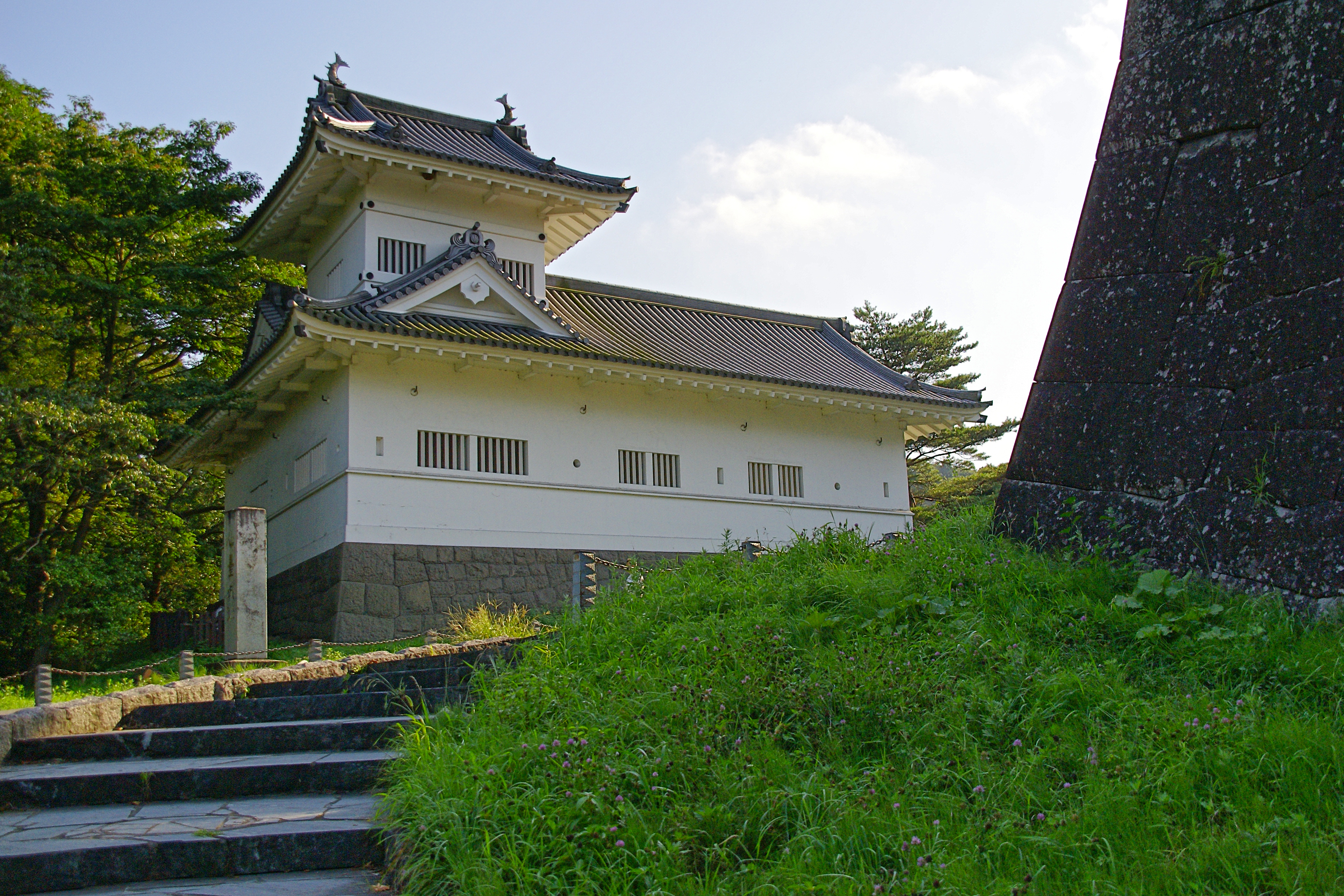
Aoba Castle

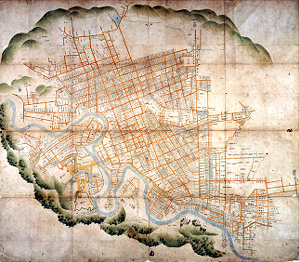
Map of the area around Sendai Castle

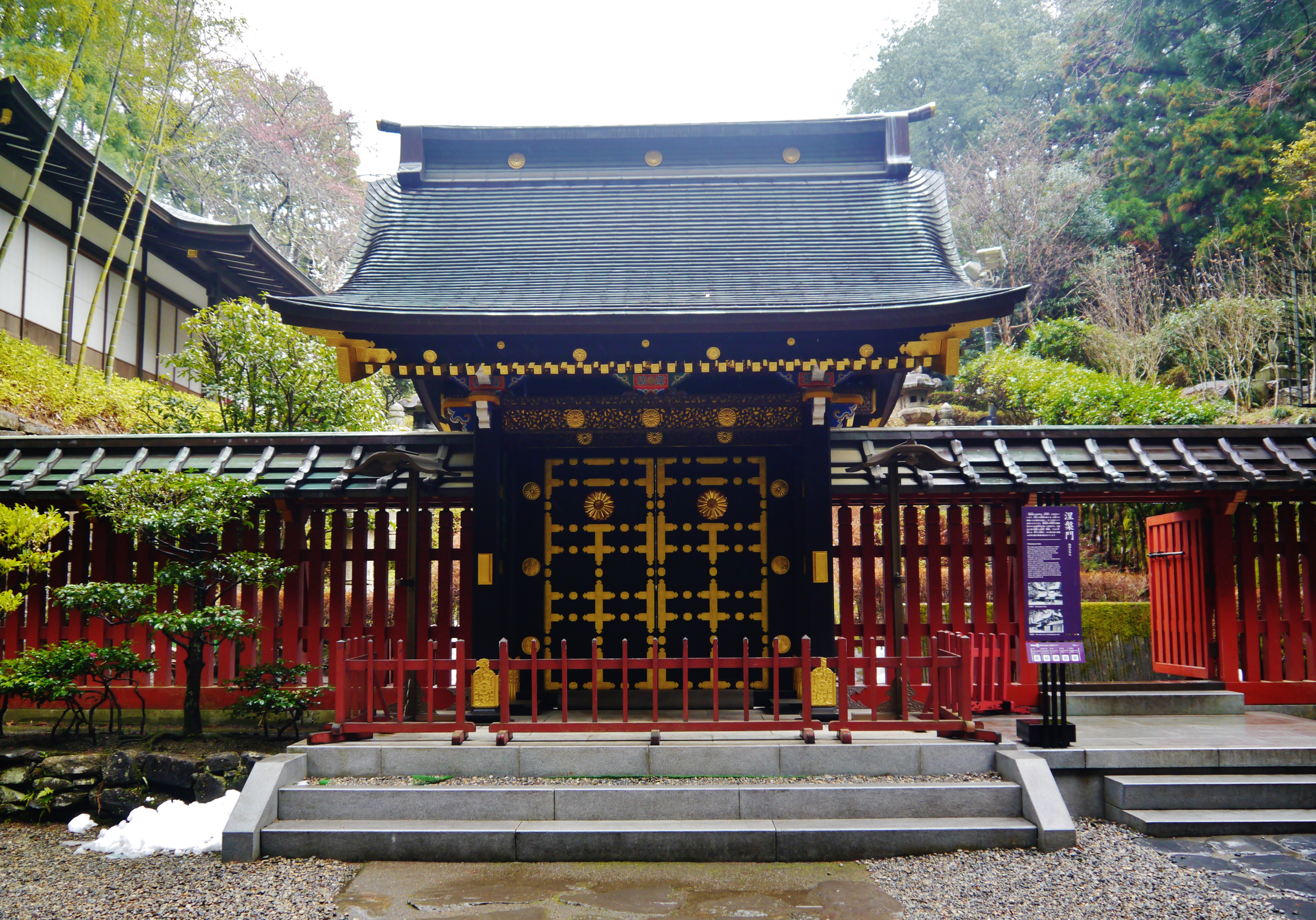
Zuihōden

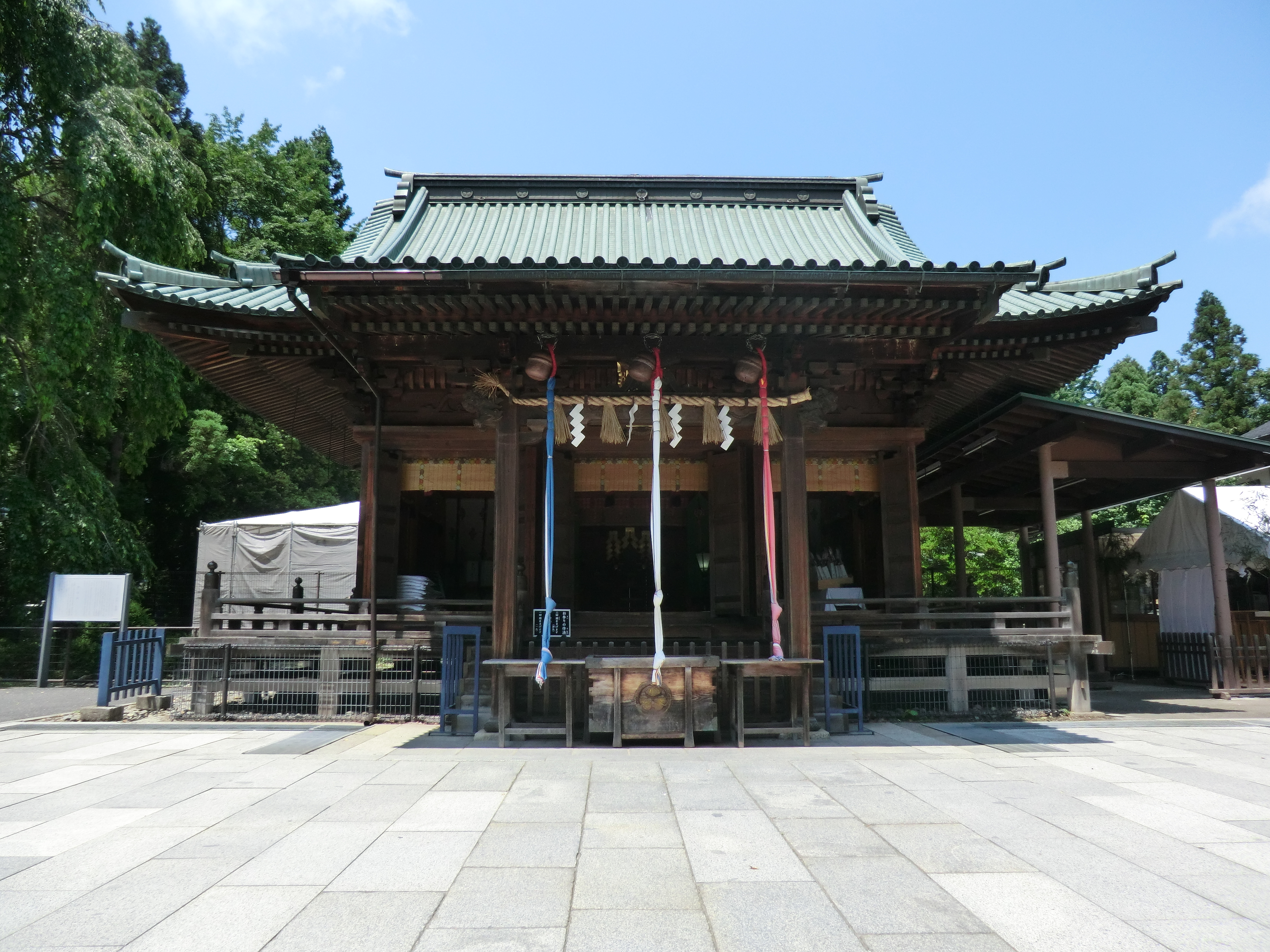
Sendai Tōshōgū

=== Modern era ===
The first railway line between Sendai and Tokyo, now the Tōhoku Main Line, opened in 1887, bringing the area within a day's travel from Tokyo for the first time in history. Tohoku Imperial University, the region's first university, was founded in Sendai in 1907 and became the first Japanese university to admit female students in 1913.

Sendai was incorporated as a city on 1 April 1889, with the post-Meiji restoration creation of the modern municipalities system following the abolition of the han system. At the time of incorporation, the city's area was 17.45 square kilometres (6.74 sq mi) and its population was 86,000. The city grew, however, through seven annexations that occurred between 1928 and 1988. The city became a designated city on 1 April 1989; the city's population exceeded one million in 1999.

Sendai was considered to be one of Japan's greenest cities, mostly because of its great numbers of trees and plants. Sendai became known as The City of Trees before the Meiji Restoration, after the feudal Sendai Domain encouraged residents to plant trees in their gardens. As a result, many houses, temples, and shrines in central Sendai had household forests (屋敷林, yashikirin), which were used as resources for wood and other everyday materials.

In 1925, the Senseki Line to Sendai Station became the first underground railway segment in Japan, preceding the opening of the Tokyo Metro Ginza Line (Asia's first subway line) by two years.

The 2nd Infantry Division was known as the "Sendai Division" as it was based in Sendai, and recruited locally. During the Second World War it was involved in many different campaigns, but one of the most important was the Battle of Guadalcanal. During the bombing of Sendai during World War II by the United States on 10 July 1945, much of the historic center of the city was burned, with 2,755 inhabitants killed and 11,933 houses destroyed in the city.

Gallery

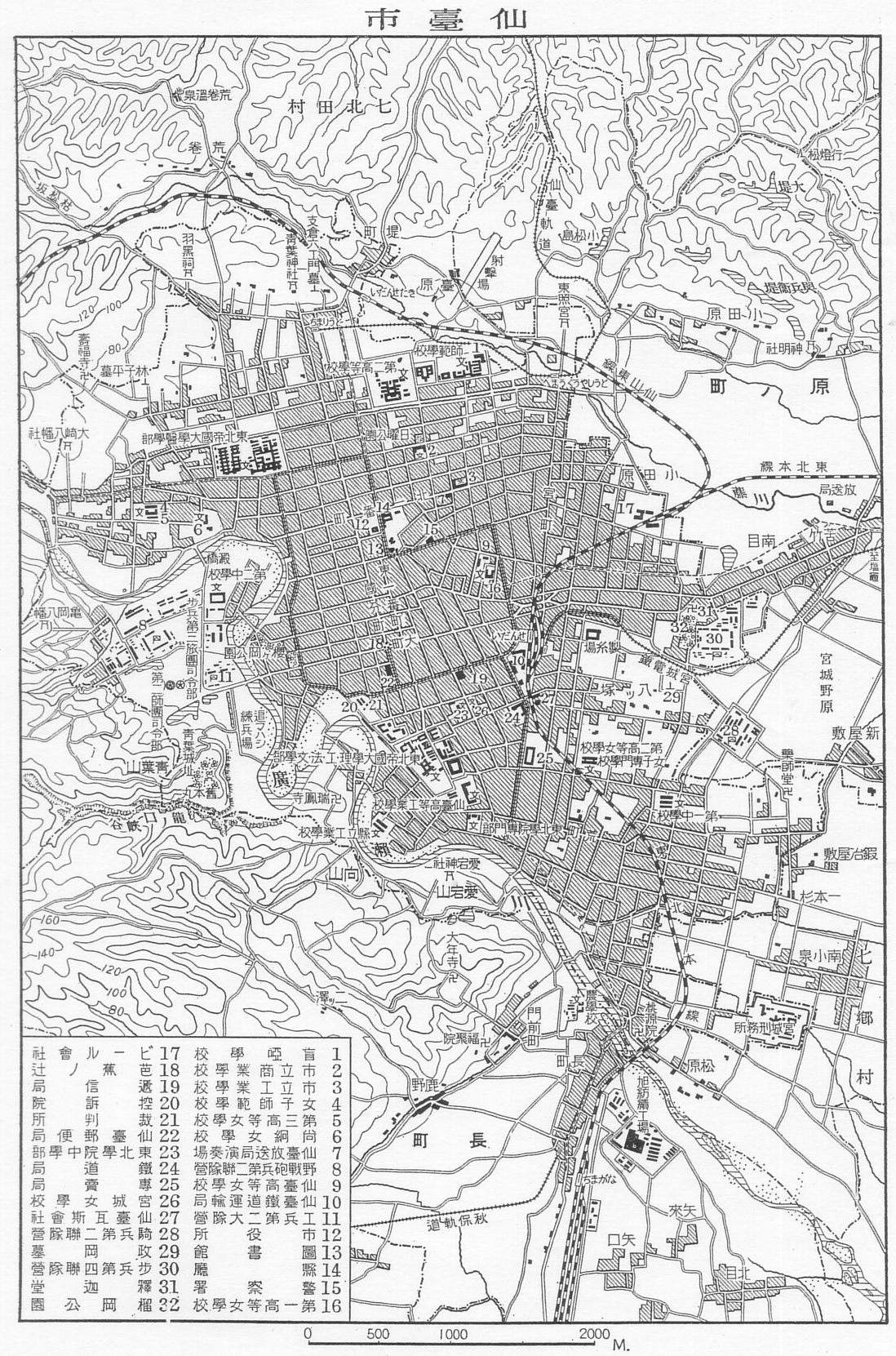
A city map of 1927, Japanese language edition

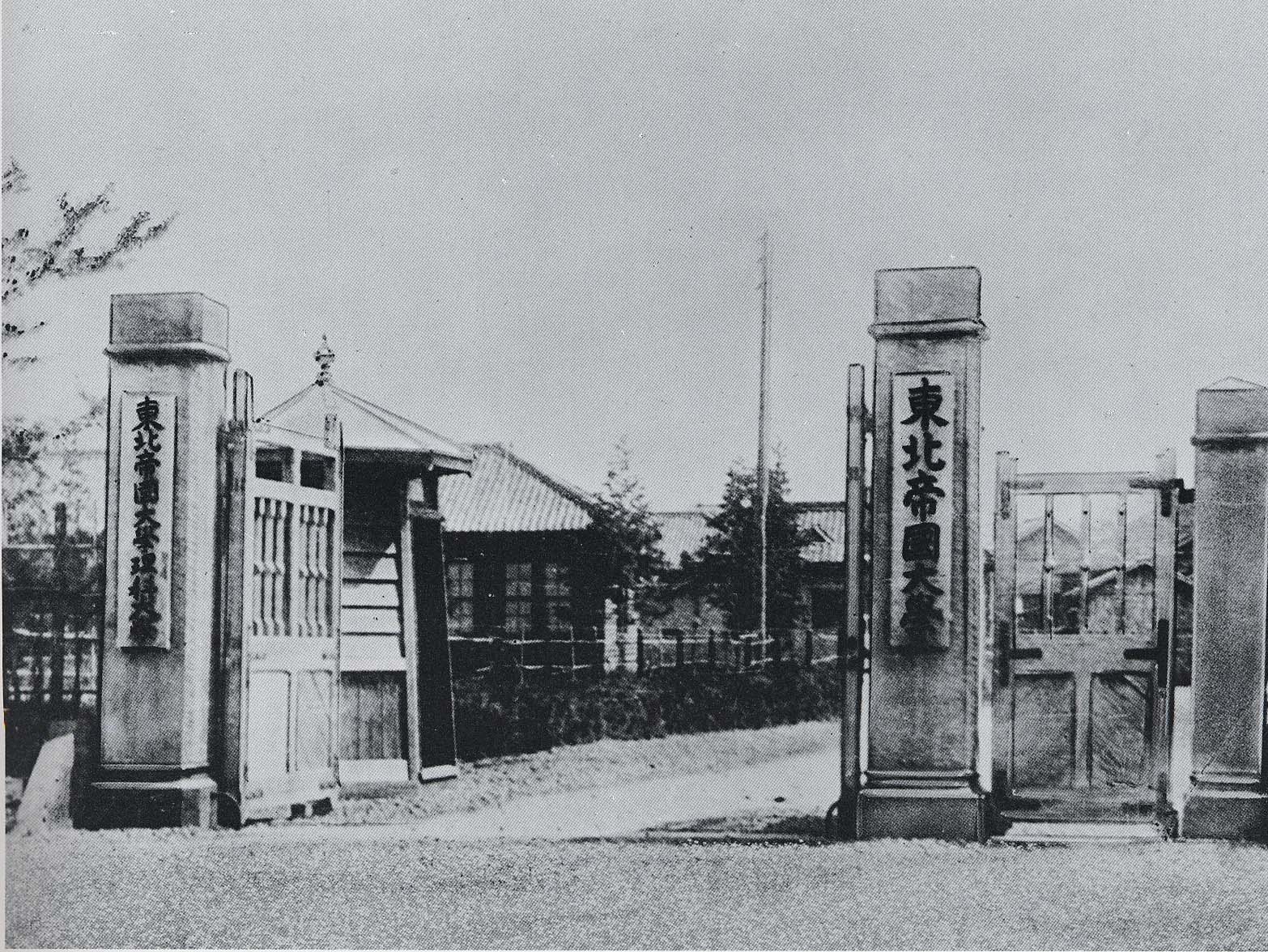
Tohoku Imperial University

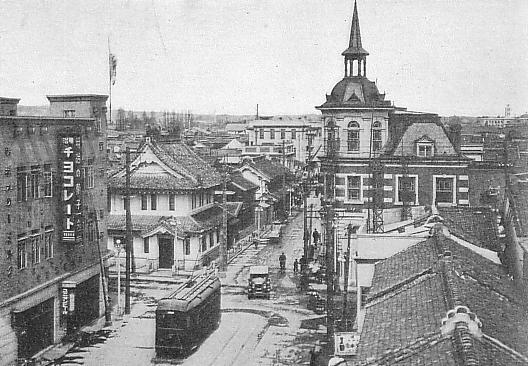
Basho no Tsuji (1930)

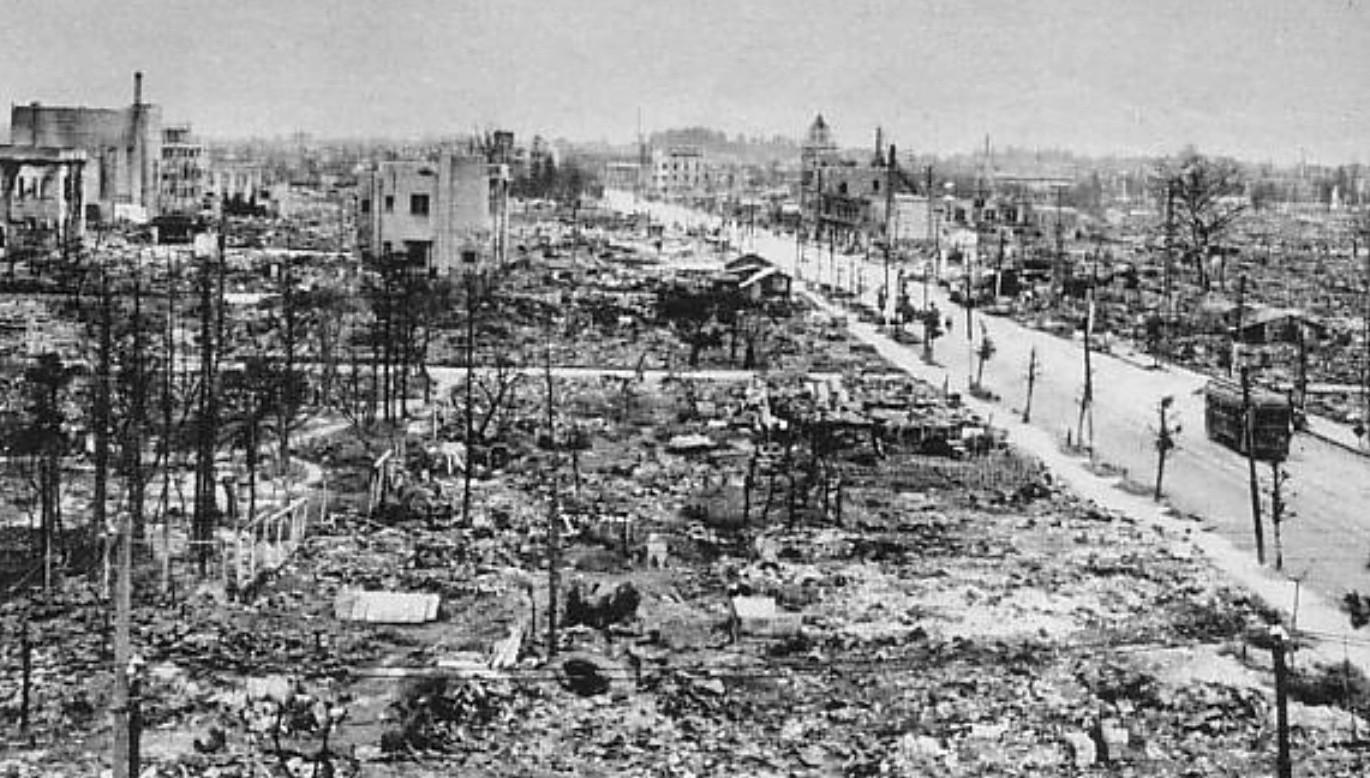
Bombing of Sendai during World War II

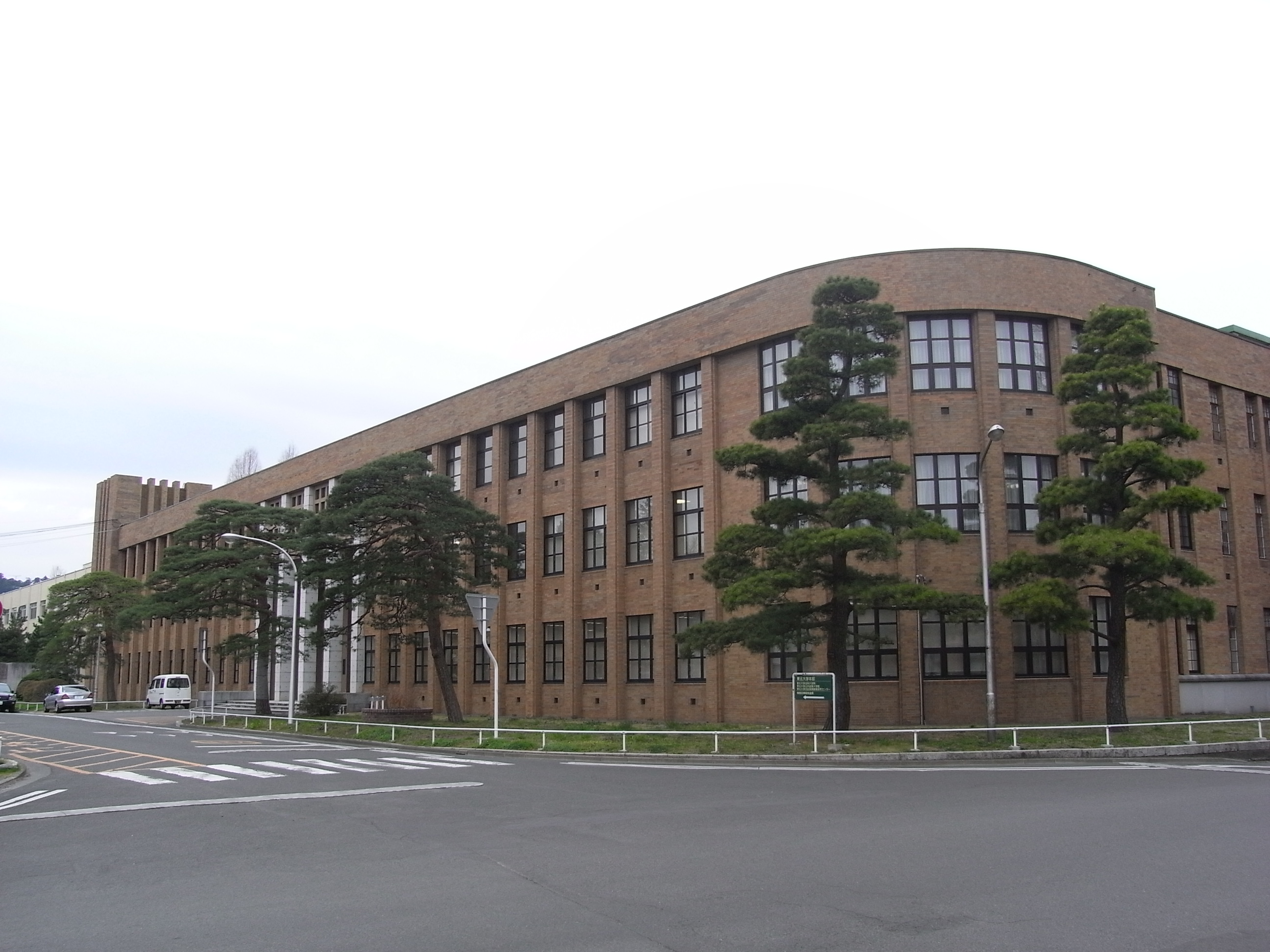
Tohoku University Katahira Campus

=== Postwar development ===
Following World War II, the city was rebuilt, and Sendai became a vital transportation and logistics hub for the Tōhoku region with the construction of major arteries such as the Tōhoku Expressway and Tōhoku Shinkansen.

In the early 1950s, the United States Army, Japan operated Camp Schimmelpfennig and Camp Sendai in the city.

Sendai has been subject to several major earthquakes in recent history, including the 1978 Miyagi earthquake, which was a catalyst for the development of Japan's current earthquake resistance standards, and the 2005 Miyagi earthquake. Most recently, the coastal area of Sendai, including Sendai Airport, was severely damaged in the 2011 Tōhoku earthquake and tsunami. The tsunami reportedly reached as far as Wakabayashi Ward Office, 8 kilometers (5.0 mi) from the coastline. Thousands were killed, and countless more were injured and/or made homeless. Sendai's port was heavily damaged and temporarily closed, reopening on 16 April 2011.

Gallery

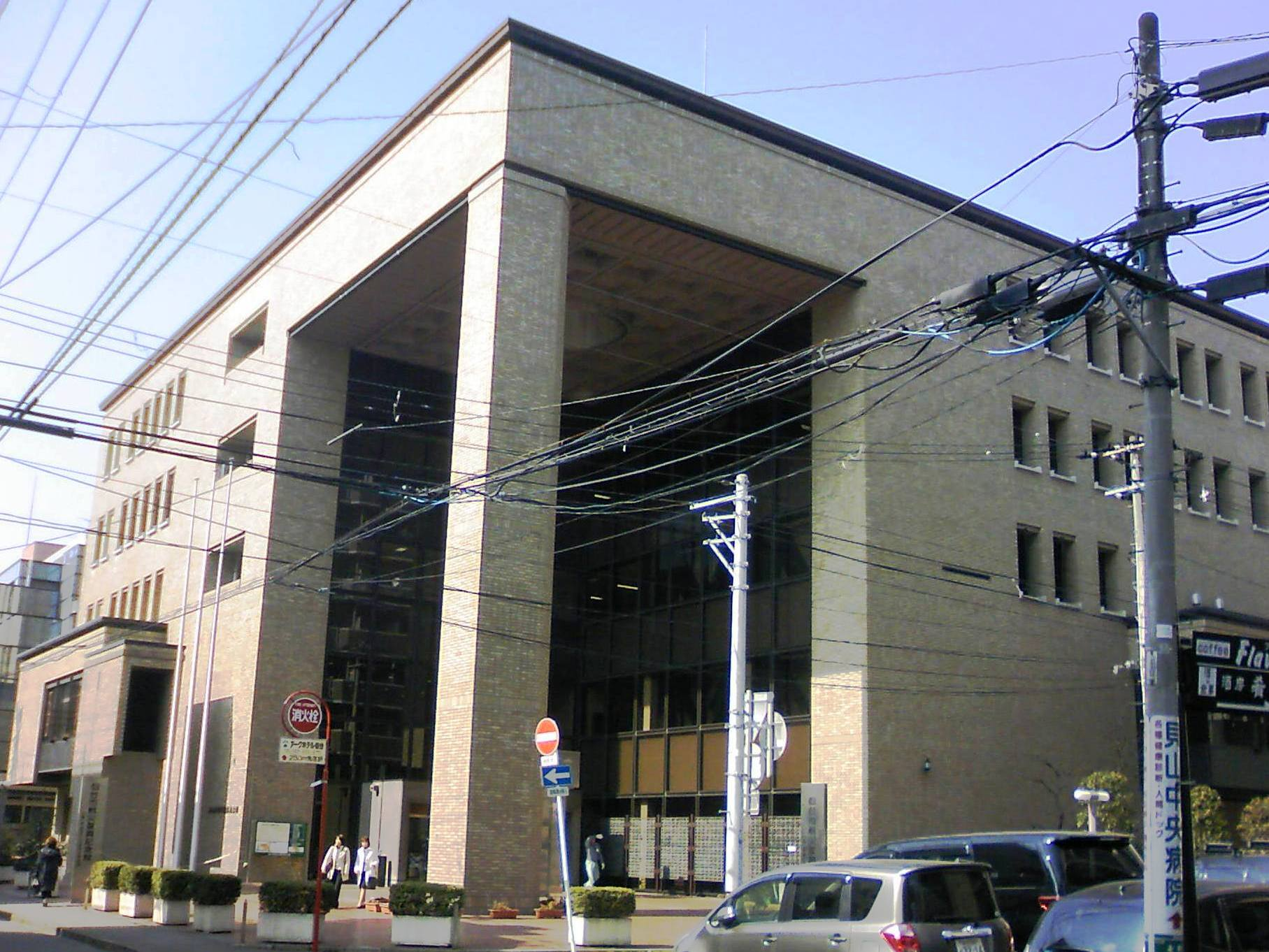
Sendai City War Reconstruction Memorial Hall

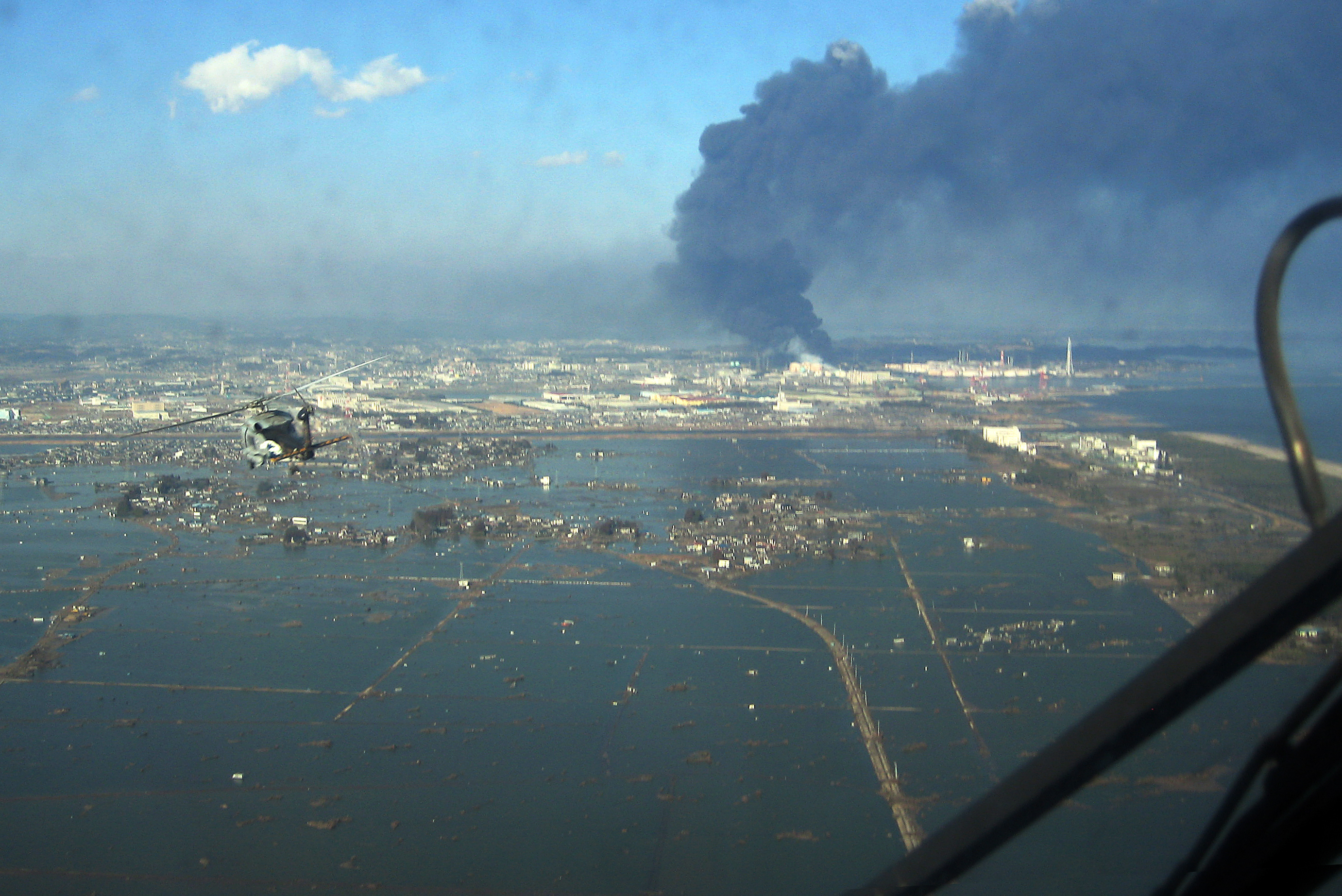
An aerial view of Sendai harbour after the earthquake, 12 March 2011

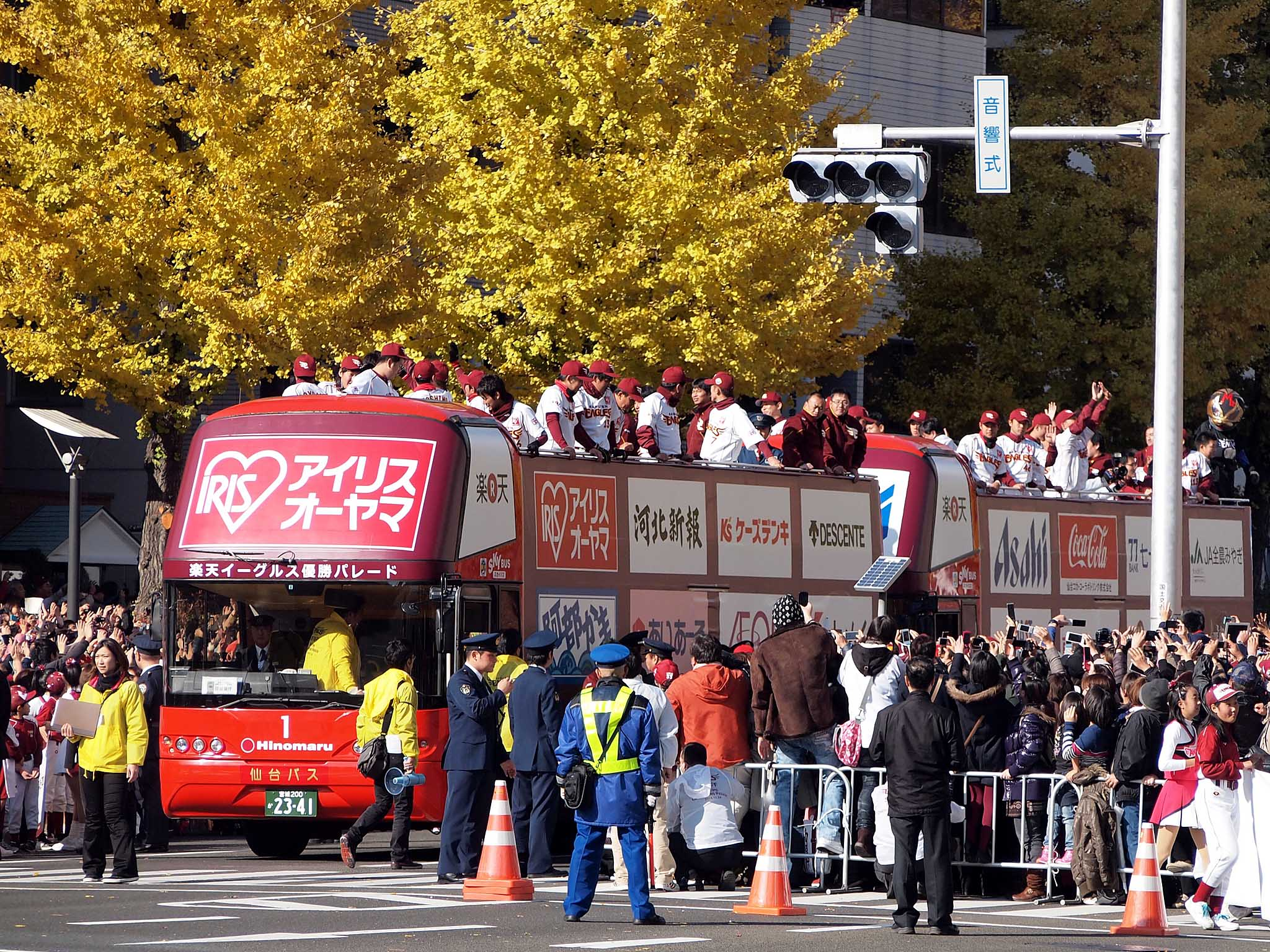
Tohoku Rakuten Golden Eagles (2013)

== Geography ==
Sendai is located at lat. 38°16'05" north, long. 140°52'11" east. The city's area is 788.09 km^{2} (304.28 sq mi), and stretches from the Pacific Ocean to the Ōu Mountains, which are the east and west borders of Miyagi Prefecture. As a result, the city's geography is quite diverse. Eastern Sendai is a plains area, the center of the city is hilly, and western areas are mountainous. The highest point in the city is Mount Funagata which stands 1,500 metres (4,921 feet) above sea level. Unique among Japan's large coastal cities, Sendai's city core is built on a terrace at 40–60 m (131–197 ft) elevation.

The Sendai basin area is 939 km^{2} (363 sq mi) (the mountainous area is 675 km^{2} (261 sq mi), the plain area is 245 km^{2} (95 sq mi) and the water body is 20 km^{2} (8 sq mi)). The basin consists of urban areas, paddy fields and forests. The mid and upstream areas have forests. The Natori River flows through the area and reaches Sendai Bay after 55 km (34 mi).

The Hirose River (広瀬川, Hirose-gawa) flows 45 kilometres (28 miles) through Sendai. The river is well known as a symbol of Sendai, especially because it appears in the lyrics of Aoba-jō Koi-uta (青葉城恋唄; literally, The Aoba Castle Love Song), a popular song sung by Muneyuki Satō. Aoba Castle was built close to the river to use the river as a natural moat. The river frequently flooded until the 1950s, but dams and levees constructed in the 1960s and 1970s have made such floods rare.

Most mountains in Sendai are dormant volcanoes, much older than the more famous Mount Zaō and Naruko volcanoes in nearby municipalities. However, many hot springs can be found in the city, indicating hydrothermal activity. The Miyagi Oki earthquake occurs offshore Sendai once every 25 to 40 years. The 7.2 magnitude 2005 Miyagi earthquake, which occurred on August 16, 2005, had an epicenter close to the Miyagi Oki earthquake area. However, the Headquarters for Earthquake Research Promotion concluded that it was not the Miyagi Oki earthquake, saying "...the recent event is not thought to be this earthquake. This is because the magnitude of the earthquake was small, and the source area, which was estimated from the aftershock distribution and seismic waves, didn't cover the whole expected source region. Although, the recent event ruptured a part of the focal region of the expected earthquake." In 2011, the 9.0 magnitude 2011 Tōhoku earthquake occurred offshore Sendai, resulting in a devastating tsunami.

=== Wards ===
Sendai has five wards ("ku"), which were created when it became a designated city in 1989. The city consciously avoided names that included directions (e.g., north 北, center 中央) when it chose names for the new wards.

Wards of Sendai
	Place Name						Map of Sendai
	Rōmaji	Kanji	Color	Population	Land area in km^{2}	Pop. density per km^{2}	
1	Aoba-ku - (administrative center)	青葉区	blue	296,551	302.278	981	A map of Sendai's Wards
2	Izumi-ku	泉区	red	215,048	146.61	1,470	A map of Sendai's Wards
3	Miyagino-ku	宮城野区	yellow	196,086	58,19	3,370	A map of Sendai's Wards
4	Taihaku-ku	太白区	orange	226,069	228.39	997	A map of Sendai's Wards
5	Wakabayashi-ku	若林区	light green	137,494	50.86	2,700	A map of Sendai's Wards

=== Cityscape ===
Gallery

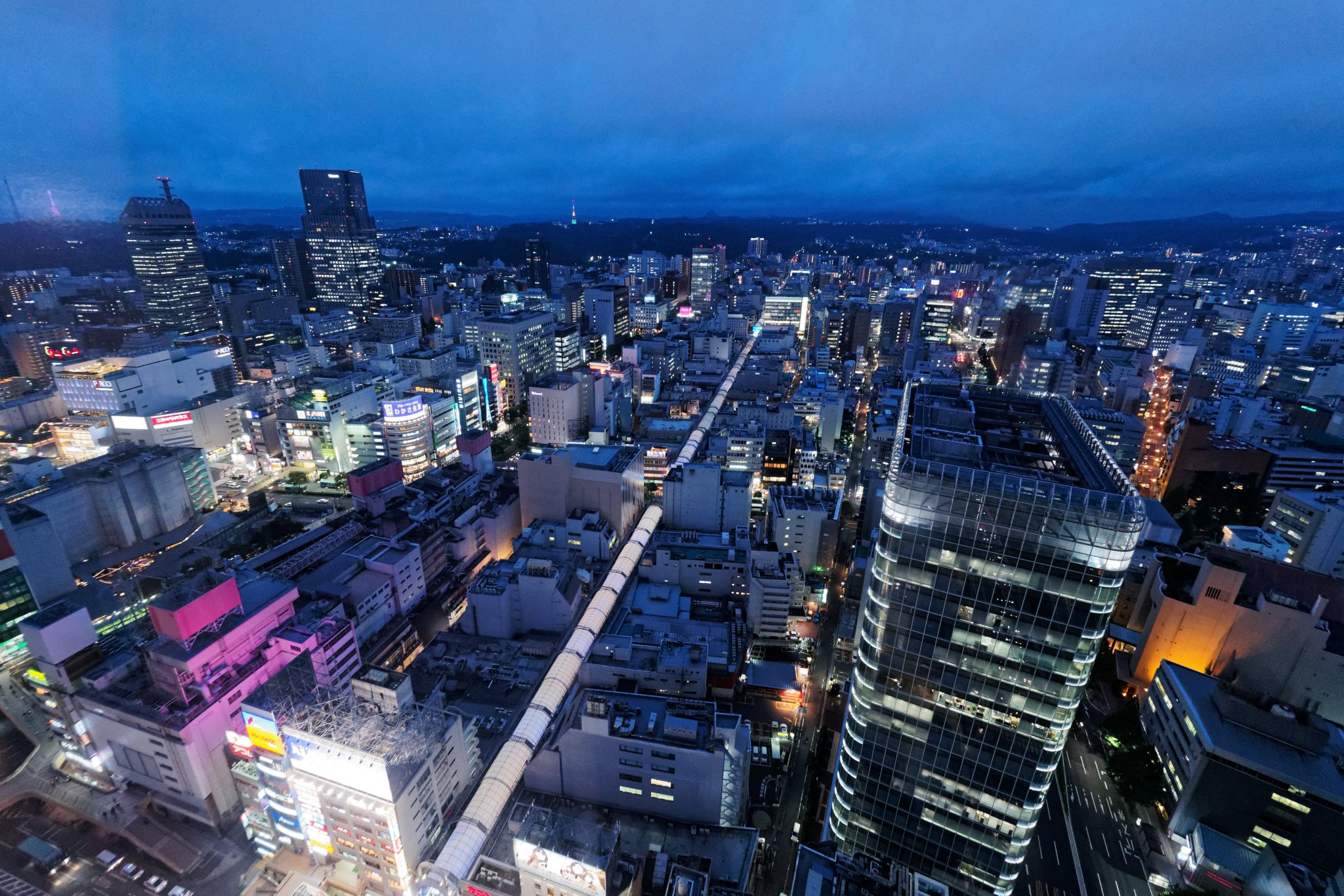
View of Sendai from AER (2019)

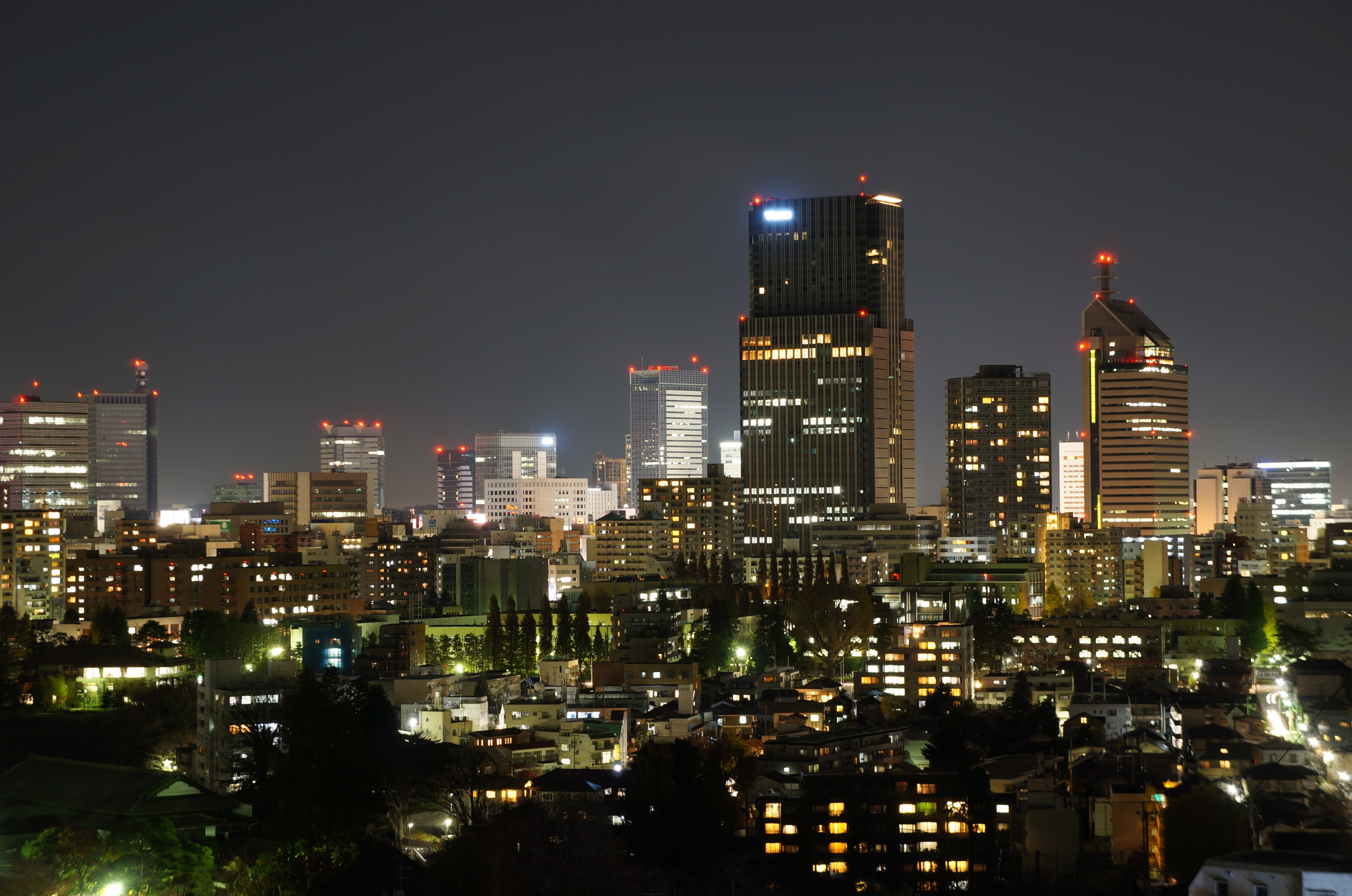
Sendai night skyline from Mukaiyama (2012)

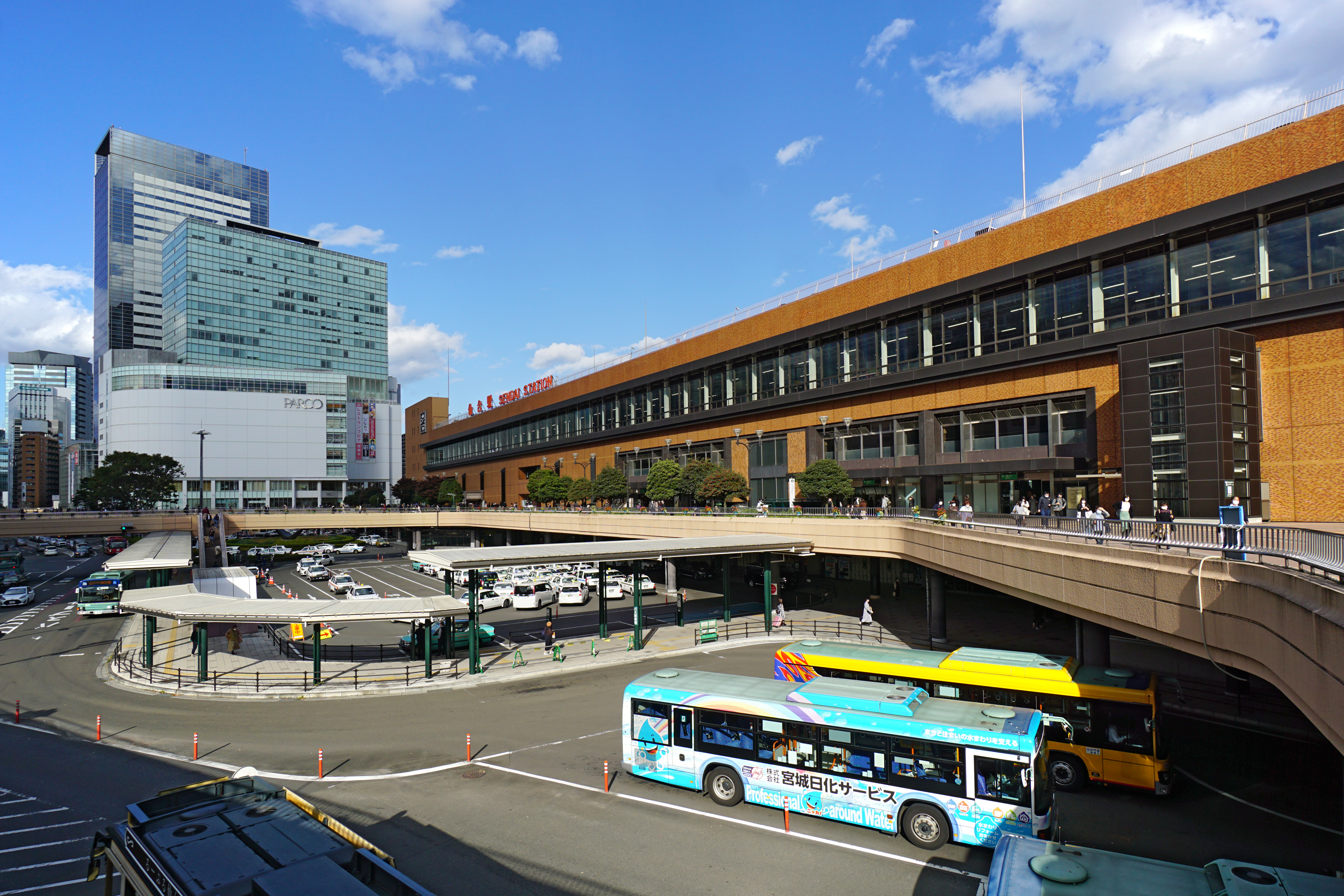
Sendai Station (2021)

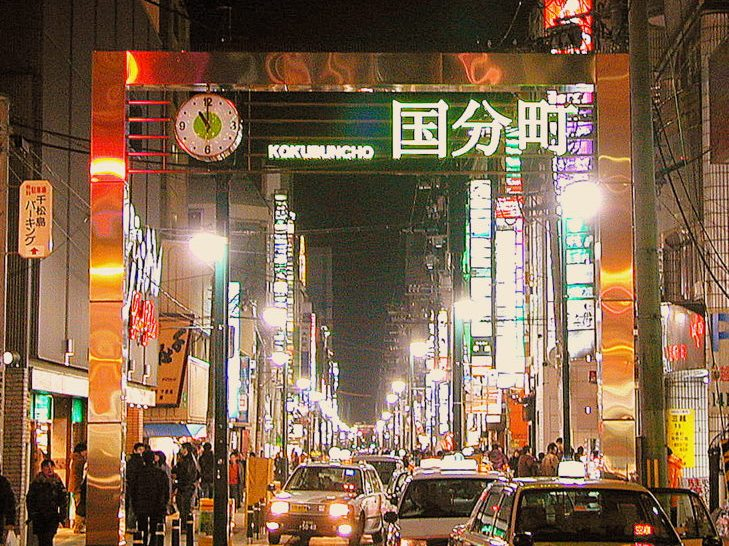
Kokubunchō (2010)

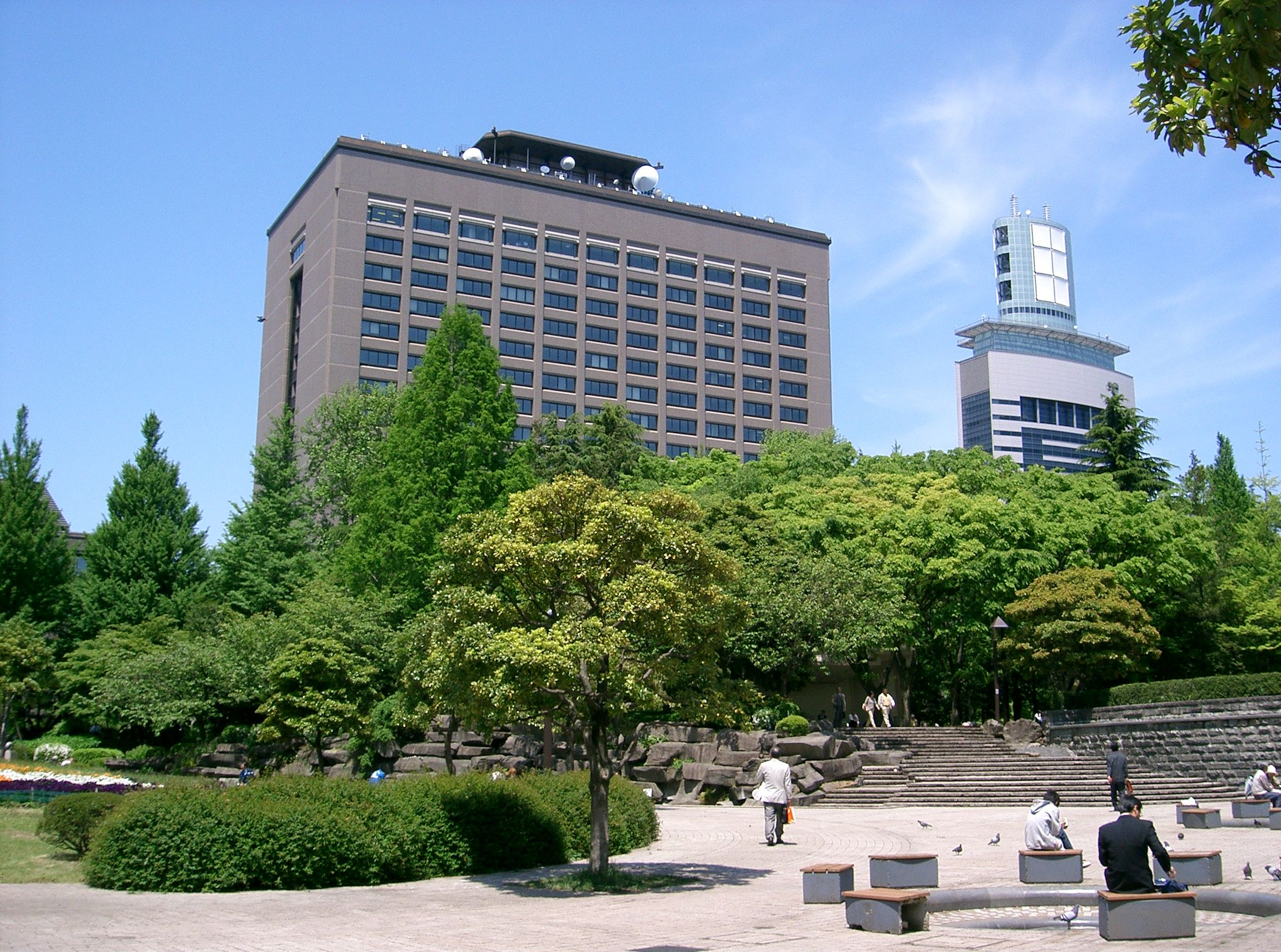
Kōtōdai Park (2007)
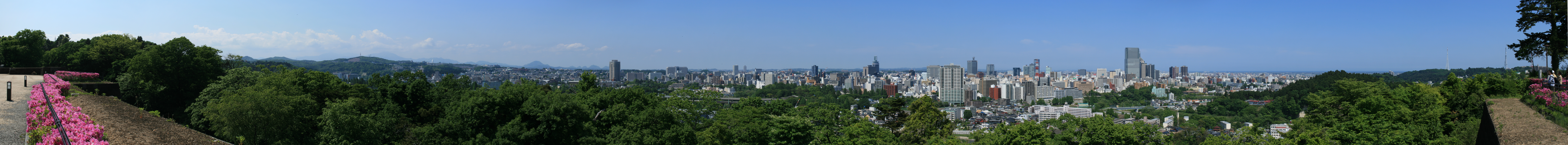
City view from the Sendai Castle on Mount Aoba

== Climate ==
Sendai has a humid subtropical climate (Köppen Cfa), which features warm and wet summers, and cool and dry winters. Sendai summers are not as hot as Tokyo to the south, while the winters are much milder than Sapporo to the north, but retains significant seasonal differences in temperature and rainfall. Extremes range from −11.7 to 37.4 °C (10.9 to 99.3 °F). Of Japan's prefectural capitals, Sendai experiences the fewest days of extreme temperatures (highs outside 0–30 °C (32–86 °F)) at 19.6 per year, compared to Tokyo's average of 49.

Winters are cool and relatively dry, with January temperatures averaging 1.5 °C (34.7 °F). Snowfall is much lower than cities on the Sea of Japan coast, such as Niigata and Tottori. Summers are very warm and much of the year's precipitation is delivered at this time, with an August average of 24.1 °C (75.4 °F). The city is rarely hit by typhoons, and experiences only 6 days with more than 10 centimetres (4 in) of rainfall on average. Sendai's monsoon season usually begins in late April to early October, which is later than in most cities in Japan. During this season, cold winds from the Okhotsk air mass, called "Yamase", blow in and depress daytime highs.

Climate data for Sendai (elevation 38.9 m, 1991–2020 normals, extremes 1926–present)
Month	Jan	Feb	Mar	Apr	May	Jun	Jul	Aug	Sep	Oct	Nov	Dec	Year
Record high °C (°F)	17.9 (64.2)	21.1 (70.0)	24.2 (75.6)	29.9 (85.8)	33.2 (91.8)	35.1 (95.2)	36.7 (98.1)	37.3 (99.1)	37.4 (99.3)	30.3 (86.5)	24.4 (75.9)	21.8 (71.2)	37.4 (99.3)
Mean maximum °C (°F)	11.9 (53.4)	13.8 (56.8)	18.3 (64.9)	23.8 (74.8)	27.7 (81.9)	29.9 (85.8)	33.2 (91.8)	34.2 (93.6)	31.5 (88.7)	26.5 (79.7)	20.6 (69.1)	15.4 (59.7)	34.8 (94.6)
Mean daily maximum °C (°F)	5.6 (42.1)	6.5 (43.7)	10.0 (50.0)	15.5 (59.9)	20.2 (68.4)	23.1 (73.6)	26.6 (79.9)	28.2 (82.8)	25.0 (77.0)	19.8 (67.6)	14.1 (57.4)	8.3 (46.9)	16.9 (62.4)
Daily mean °C (°F)	2.0 (35.6)	2.4 (36.3)	5.5 (41.9)	10.7 (51.3)	15.6 (60.1)	19.2 (66.6)	22.9 (73.2)	24.4 (75.9)	21.2 (70.2)	15.7 (60.3)	9.8 (49.6)	4.5 (40.1)	12.8 (55.0)
Mean daily minimum °C (°F)	−1.3 (29.7)	−1.1 (30.0)	1.4 (34.5)	6.3 (43.3)	11.7 (53.1)	16.1 (61.0)	20.2 (68.4)	21.6 (70.9)	18.0 (64.4)	11.9 (53.4)	5.6 (42.1)	0.9 (33.6)	9.3 (48.7)
Mean minimum °C (°F)	−4.8 (23.4)	−4.8 (23.4)	−2.8 (27.0)	1.1 (34.0)	6.4 (43.5)	11.8 (53.2)	16.4 (61.5)	17.4 (63.3)	12.5 (54.5)	5.9 (42.6)	0.5 (32.9)	−3.1 (26.4)	−5.4 (22.3)
Record low °C (°F)	−11.7 (10.9)	−11.5 (11.3)	−8.9 (16.0)	−5.0 (23.0)	−0.3 (31.5)	5.4 (41.7)	9.0 (48.2)	12.9 (55.2)	5.6 (42.1)	−0.1 (31.8)	−5.0 (23.0)	−10.8 (12.6)	−11.7 (10.9)
Average precipitation mm (inches)	42.3 (1.67)	33.9 (1.33)	74.4 (2.93)	90.2 (3.55)	110.2 (4.34)	143.7 (5.66)	178.4 (7.02)	157.8 (6.21)	192.6 (7.58)	150.6 (5.93)	58.7 (2.31)	44.1 (1.74)	1,276.7 (50.26)
Average snowfall cm (inches)	21 (8.3)	18 (7.1)	11 (4.3)	1 (0.4)	0 (0)	0 (0)	0 (0)	0 (0)	0 (0)	0 (0)	0 (0)	9 (3.5)	59 (23)
Average precipitation days (≥ 0.5mm)	7.6	7.2	9.1	9.2	10.2	12.3	15.5	12.7	13.0	9.6	7.4	7.9	121.7
Average snowy days	20.6	17.1	11.2	1.7	0.1	0.0	0.0	0.0	0.0	0.0	1.8	13.3	65.6
Average relative humidity (%)	66	64	61	63	70	79	83	81	78	72	68	68	71
Mean monthly sunshine hours	149.0	154.7	178.6	193.7	191.9	143.7	126.3	144.5	128.0	147.0	143.4	136.3	1,836.9
Source: Japan Meteorological Agency

Climate data for Nikkawa, Sendai (elevation 265 m, 1991–2020 normals, extremes 1976–present)
Month	Jan	Feb	Mar	Apr	May	Jun	Jul	Aug	Sep	Oct	Nov	Dec	Year
Record high °C (°F)	15.3 (59.5)	17.0 (62.6)	21.8 (71.2)	29.6 (85.3)	32.2 (90.0)	33.3 (91.9)	35.4 (95.7)	34.9 (94.8)	33.7 (92.7)	28.7 (83.7)	22.7 (72.9)	20.6 (69.1)	35.4 (95.7)
Mean daily maximum °C (°F)	2.7 (36.9)	3.6 (38.5)	7.5 (45.5)	14.1 (57.4)	19.4 (66.9)	22.2 (72.0)	25.5 (77.9)	26.8 (80.2)	23.1 (73.6)	17.7 (63.9)	12.0 (53.6)	5.8 (42.4)	15.0 (59.0)
Daily mean °C (°F)	−0.8 (30.6)	−0.5 (31.1)	2.6 (36.7)	8.2 (46.8)	13.6 (56.5)	17.4 (63.3)	21.1 (70.0)	22.1 (71.8)	18.4 (65.1)	12.4 (54.3)	6.5 (43.7)	1.5 (34.7)	10.2 (50.4)
Mean daily minimum °C (°F)	−4.6 (23.7)	−4.6 (23.7)	−2.1 (28.2)	2.1 (35.8)	7.8 (46.0)	12.9 (55.2)	17.3 (63.1)	18.3 (64.9)	14.2 (57.6)	7.4 (45.3)	1.4 (34.5)	−2.3 (27.9)	5.7 (42.3)
Record low °C (°F)	−16.3 (2.7)	−16.3 (2.7)	−12.6 (9.3)	−7.2 (19.0)	−1.1 (30.0)	3.4 (38.1)	7.0 (44.6)	7.9 (46.2)	3.3 (37.9)	−2.8 (27.0)	−5.7 (21.7)	−16.1 (3.0)	−16.3 (2.7)
Average precipitation mm (inches)	76.3 (3.00)	60.1 (2.37)	89.0 (3.50)	101.2 (3.98)	115.1 (4.53)	157.5 (6.20)	215.0 (8.46)	215.5 (8.48)	214.7 (8.45)	145.9 (5.74)	85.4 (3.36)	92.7 (3.65)	1,568.9 (61.77)
Average snowfall cm (inches)	133 (52)	114 (45)	48 (19)	4 (1.6)	0 (0)	0 (0)	0 (0)	0 (0)	0 (0)	0 (0)	2 (0.8)	66 (26)	365 (144)
Average precipitation days (≥ 1.0 mm)	14.7	12.3	12.5	10.7	11.0	12.4	15.9	14.1	13.8	11.6	11.8	14.3	154.1
Mean monthly sunshine hours	99.0	107.0	141.6	174.6	180.0	127.3	109.1	121.4	108.2	124.5	115.9	89.7	1,498.2
Source: Japan Meteorological Agency (1991–2020 normals, extremes 1976–present)

== Demographics ==
Historical population
Year	Pop.	±%
1920	190,013	—
1925	221,709	+16.7%
1930	252,017	+13.7%
1935	278,821	+10.6%
1940	284,132	+1.9%
1945	331,570	+16.7%
1950	380,217	+14.7%
1955	414,775	+9.1%
1960	459,876	+10.9%
1965	520,059	+13.1%
1970	598,950	+15.2%
1975	709,326	+18.4%
1980	792,036	+11.7%
1985	857,335	+8.2%
1990	918,398	+7.1%
1995	971,297	+5.8%
2000	1,008,130	+3.8%
2005	1,025,098	+1.7%
2010	1,045,903	+2.0%
2015	1,082,159	+3.5%
2020	1,096,704	+1.3%

As of 1 March 2023, the city had an estimated population of 1,097,407 and a population density of 1,397 persons per km^{2}. The city's total area was 786.35 km^{2}.

The 2000 National Census revealed that 88.5% of the city's population (892,252 people) lived in a 129.69 km^{2} area, which is 16.6% of the city's total area. The population density in this area was 6,879.9 persons per km^{2}, more than 5 times higher than the city's average population density at that time, 1,286.6 persons per km^{2}. Approximately 10,000 people in Sendai were non-Japanese citizens.

Sendai had 525,828 households in 2020. The average household had approximately 2.07 members. The average household was becoming smaller every year, because single-member households were increasing. At this time Sendai had more people in their early 50s and in their 20s and early 30s than in other age groups. This is a result of the first and second baby booms in Japan, and university students. The average age in Sendai is 38.4, which makes the city one of the youngest major cities in Japan.

== Governance ==
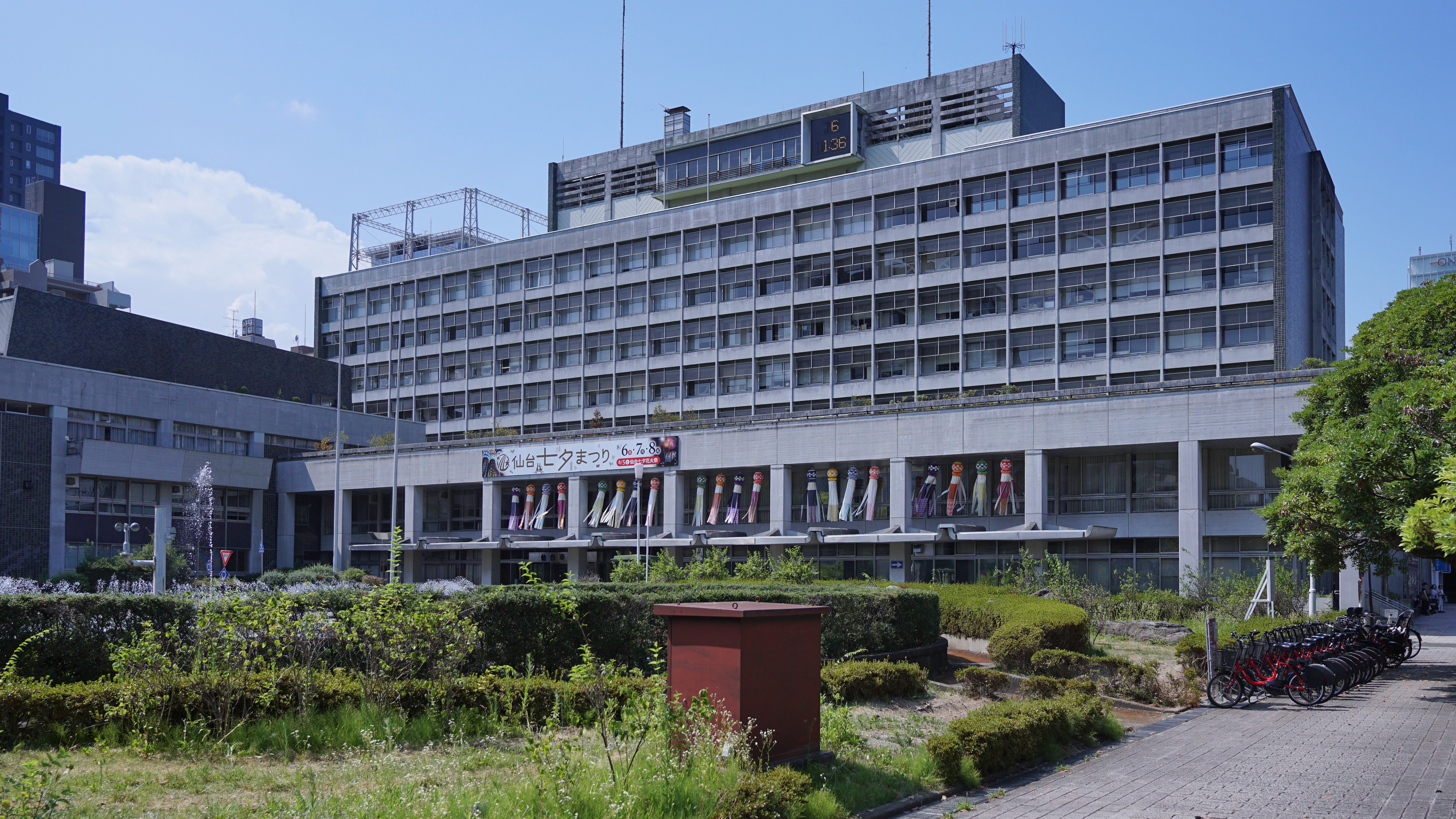
Sendai City Hall

Sendai's political system is similar to other cities in Japan, because the Local Autonomy Law makes all municipalities uniform in terms of organization and power. However, Sendai is a designated city, so it has the same jurisdiction as prefectures in some areas.

Sendai has a mayor-council form of government with a directly elected mayor and a unicameral city legislature. The Sendai City Assembly members are elected from 5 elective districts, which correspond to the city's 5 wards. The number of assembly members allocated to each ward is based upon population. As of May 2005, the city has 60 assembly members; 17 from Aoba Ward, 11 from Miyagino, 8 from Wakabayashi, 13 from Taihaku, and 11 from Izumi. The City Assembly elects an Assembly Chairperson and Vice Chairperson. Sendai has two vice mayors, who are not elected by the populace. Miyagi contributes 24 seats to the Miyagi Prefectural legislature. In terms of national politics, the city is divided between the Miyagi 1st district and the Miyagi 2nd district of the lower house of the Diet of Japan.

=== List of mayors of Sendai (1889 to present) ===
#	Name	Took office	Left office
1–2	Yoji Endo (遠藤庸治)	12 April 1889	7 March 1898
3	Yoshiaki Satomi (里見良顕)	8 April 1898	13 March 1903
4	Tomohiro Hayakawa (早川智寛)	2 April 1903	1 July 1907
5	Takayoshi Wadachi (和達孚嘉)	2 July 1907	2 July 1910
6	Yoji Endo	11 December 1910	4 November 1914
7	Kiichi Yamada (山田揆一)	25 May 1915	24 May 1919

#	Name	Took office	Left office
8–9	Takesaburo Kanomata (鹿又武三郎)	17 July 1919	26 July 1927
10	Ryunosuke Yamaguchi (山口龍之助)	13 August 1927	7 June 1930
11–13	Tokusaburo Shibuya (渋谷徳三郎)	31 August 1930	30 August 1942
14	Takeshi Imamura (今村武志)	23 September 1942	14 May 1946
15–18	Eimatsu Okazaki (岡崎栄松)	17 June 1946	17 December 1957
20–25	Takeshi Shimano (島野 武)	2 February 1958	6 November 1984

#	Name	Took office	Left office
26–28	Toru Ishii (石井亨)	23 December 1984	3 July 1993
29–31	Hajimu Fujii (藤井黎)	22 August 1993	21 August 2005
32	Katsuhiko Umehara (梅原克彦)	22 August 2005	21 August 2009
33–34	Emiko Okuyama (奥山恵美子)	22 August 2009	21 August 2017
35	Kazuko Kori (郡和子)	22 August 2017	present

== Economy ==
Sendai MEA

Sendai is the center of the Tōhoku region's economy, and is the base of the region's logistics and transportation. The GDP in Greater Sendai, Sendai Metropolitan Employment Area (1.6 million people), is US$61.7 billion in 2010. Sendai city by itself has a nominal GDP of approximately US$50 billion as of 2015. The city's economy heavily relies upon retail and services – the two industries provide approximately two thirds of the employment and close to half of the establishments.

Sendai is frequently called a branch-office economy because very few major companies are headquartered in the city. Various authorities are cooperating to alleviate this problem, primarily by encouraging high-tech ventures from Tohoku University, which is well known for its science and engineering departments. There are also incentives for startups available from the prefectural government.

Tohoku Electric Power, a major regional supplier of electric power, has its headquarters in Sendai and also operates the Shin-Sendai Thermal Power Station located within the city.

Sendai's economic growth rate has stabilized since the 2011 Japan earthquake. The growth rate was only 0.4% in 2011 after the quake created economic turmoil in coastal areas. The year after, in 2012 the rate spiked to 10.4% after reconstruction efforts. It has since fallen to a closer trend to what is expected of 3.7% in 2013.

Tourism in 2016 attracted an estimated 2.229 million visitors to Sendai.

== Education ==
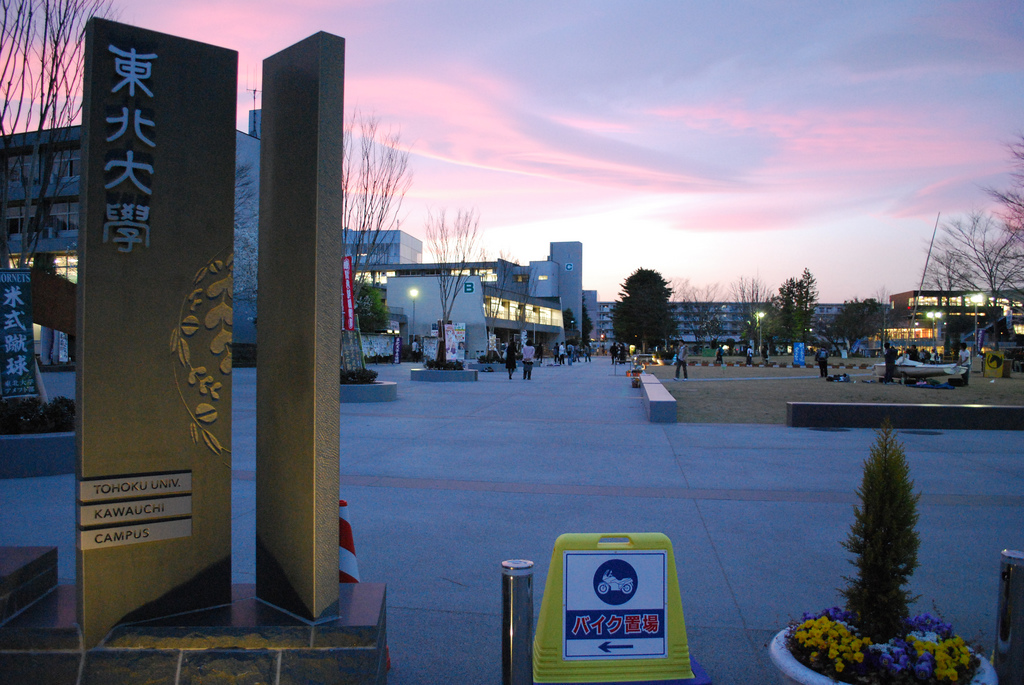
Tohoku University Kawauchi Campus

Sendai is sometimes called an "Academic City" (学都, gakuto) because the city has many universities relative to its population.

Universities located within Sendai include:

- Miyagi Gakuin Women's University
- Miyagi University
- Miyagi University of Education
- Tohoku Gakuin University
- Tohoku Fukushi University
- Tohoku Medical and Pharmaceutical University
- Tohoku University

Schools in the city include Tohoku International School.

== Transport ==
Sendai transport map

=== Airport ===
The city is served by Sendai Airport (located in neighboring Natori), which has international flights to several countries, and the Port of Sendai. A rail link to Sendai began service on March 18, 2007. Ibex Airlines headquarters is also located near the airport.

=== Railway ===
JR East's Sendai Station is the main transport hub for the city. The station is served by seven JR lines and is a major station on the Tōhoku and Akita Shinkansen lines. An underground passage connects the station to the Sendai Subway. The subway has two lines— Namboku ("north-south") and Tōzai ("east-west") with a total of 30 stations. When completed in 2015, Yagiyama station became the highest-elevated subway station in the country, at 136.4 meters (448 ft).

- East Japan Railway Company (JR East)
  - Tōhoku Shinkansen: Sendai
  - Tōhoku Main Line: Minami-Sendai – Nagamachi – Sendai – Higashi-Sendai – Iwakiri
  - Jōban Line: Minami-Sendai – Nagamachi – Sendai
  - Senzan Line: Sendai – Tōshōgū – Kita-Sendai – Kitayama – Tōhokufukushidaimae – Kunimi – Kuzuoka – Rikuzen-Ochiai – Ayashi – Rikuzen-Shirasawa – Kumagane – Sakunami – Yatsumori – Okunikkawa
  - Senseki Line: Aoba-dōri – Sendai – Tsutsujigaoka – Miyaginohara – Rikuzen-Haranomachi – Nigatake – Kozurushinden – Fukudamachi – Rikuzen-Takasago – Nakanosakae
- Sendai Subway (All stations)

=== Bus ===
In addition to the public bus system, a loop bus called Loople runs between tourism hotspots around the city.

=== Highways ===
The Tōhoku Expressway runs north–south through western Sendai, and is connected to other highways, such as the Sendai-Nambu Road, Sendai-Tobu Road, Sanriku Expressway (Sendai-Matsushima Road), and Sendai Hokubu Road.

- Tōhoku Expressway
- Sendai-Tōbu Road
- Sanriku Expressway
- Sendai-Nanbu Road
- National Route 4
- National Route 6
- National Route 45
- National Route 47
- National Route 48
- National Route 286
- National Route 346
- National Route 457

=== Port ===
Ferries connecting Tomakomai and Nagoya stop at the Port of Sendai.

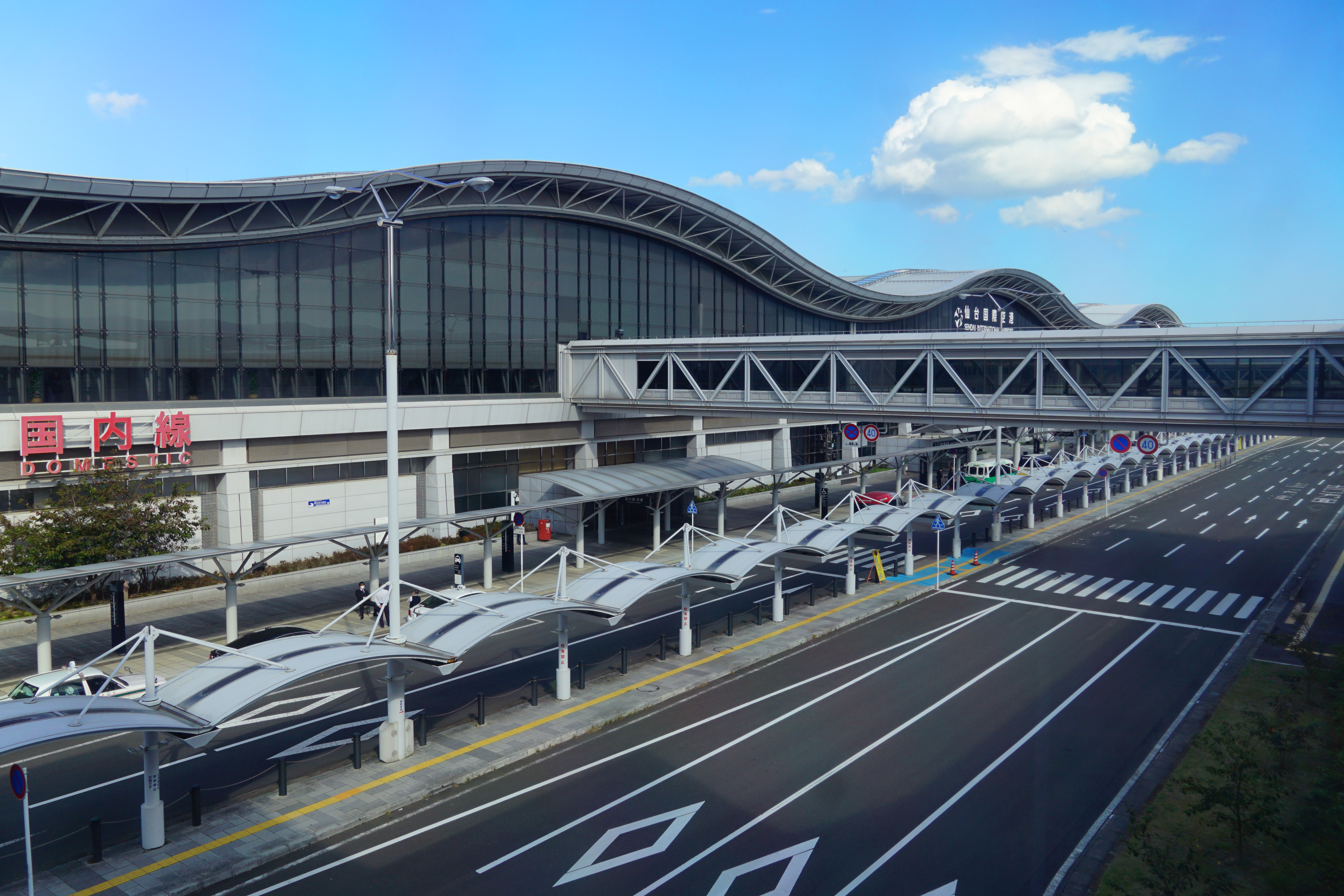
Sendai Airport

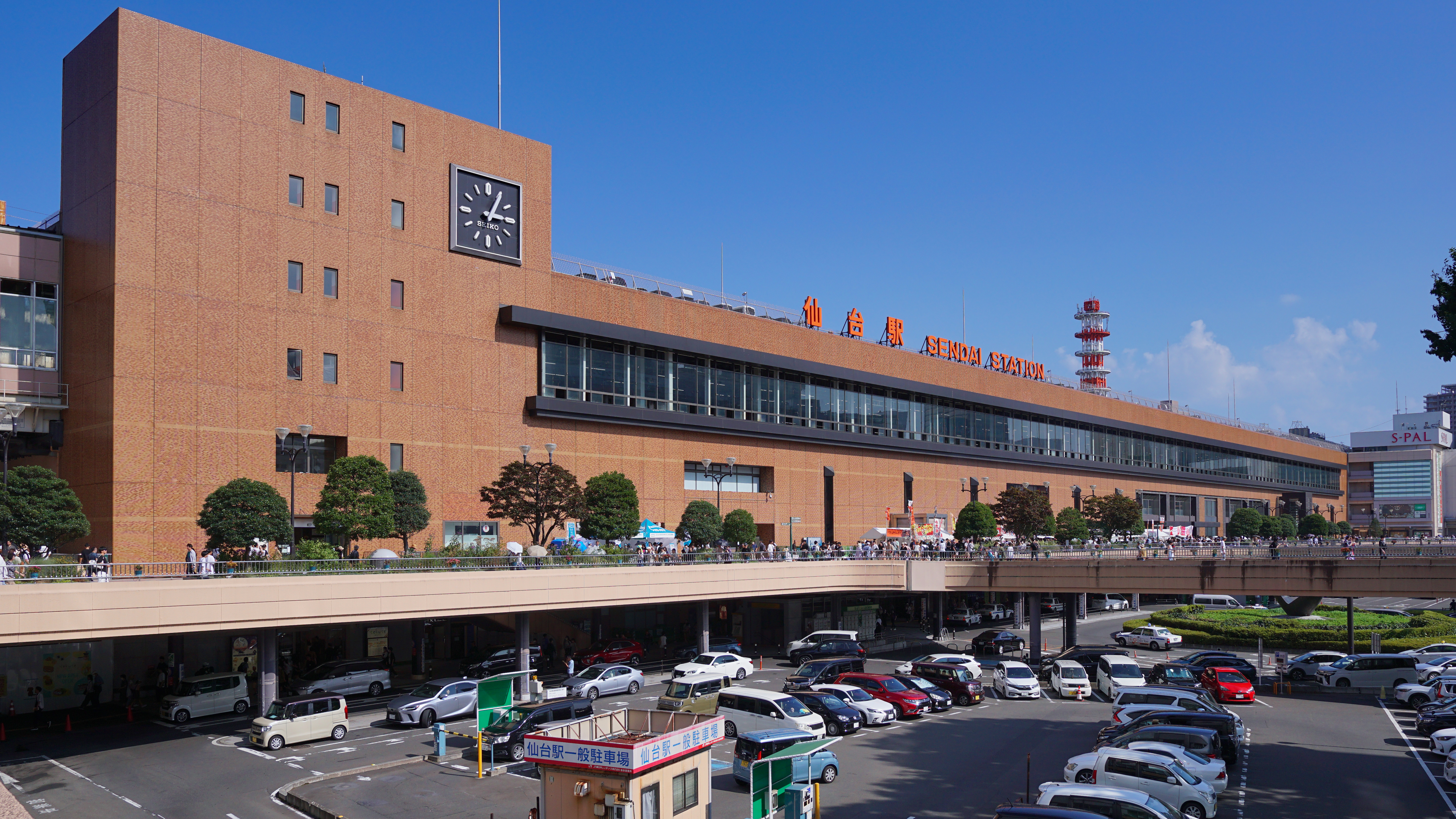
Sendai Station

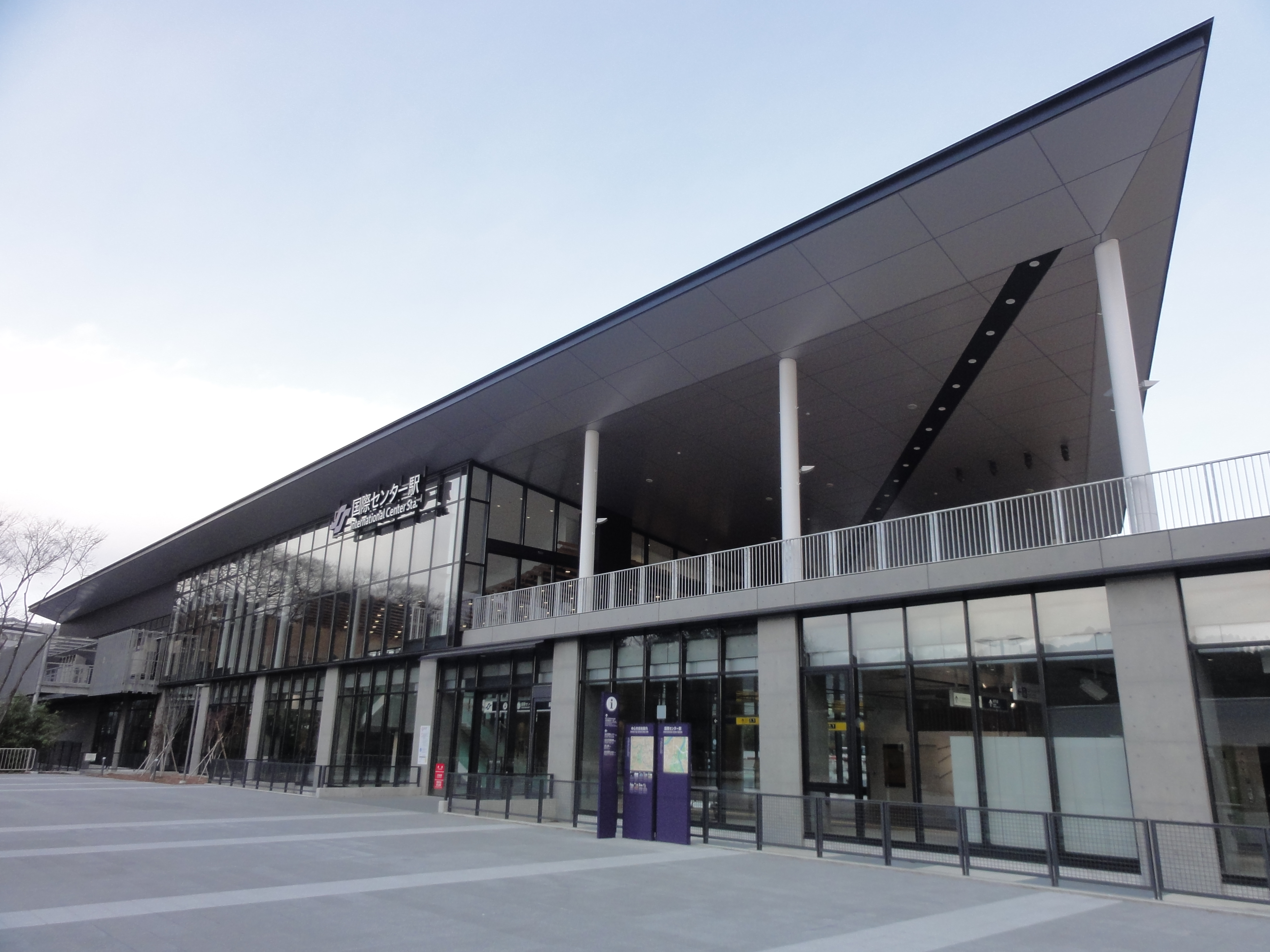
International Center Station

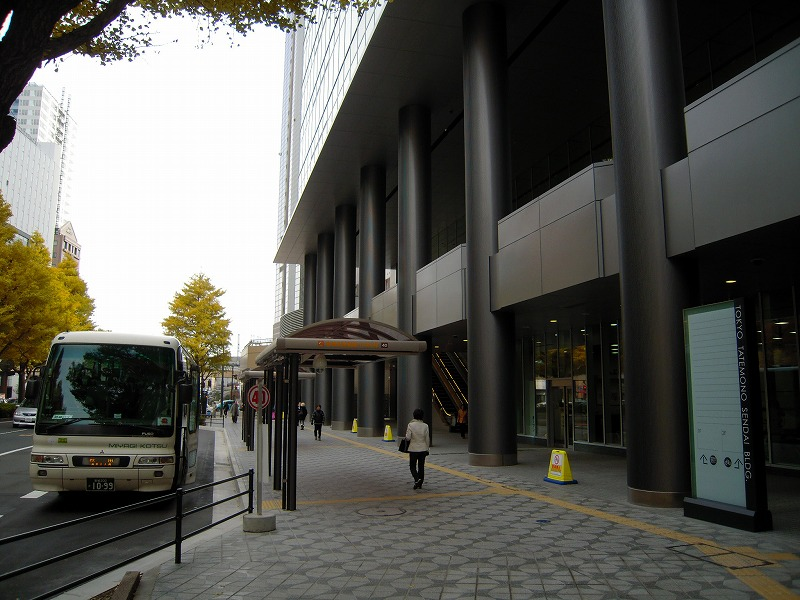
Sendai Highway Buscenter

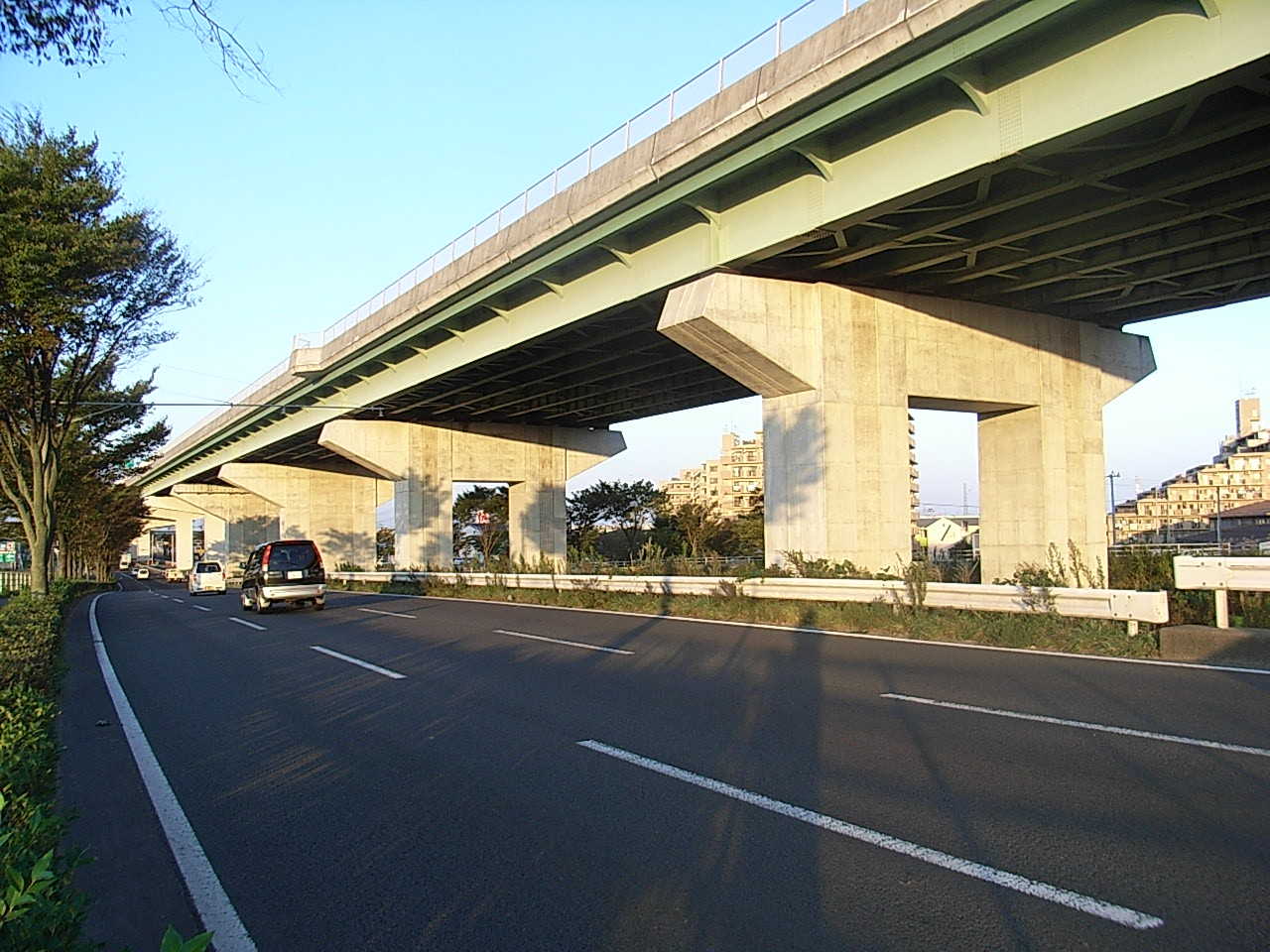
Sendai-Tōbu Road (Gurutto Sendai)

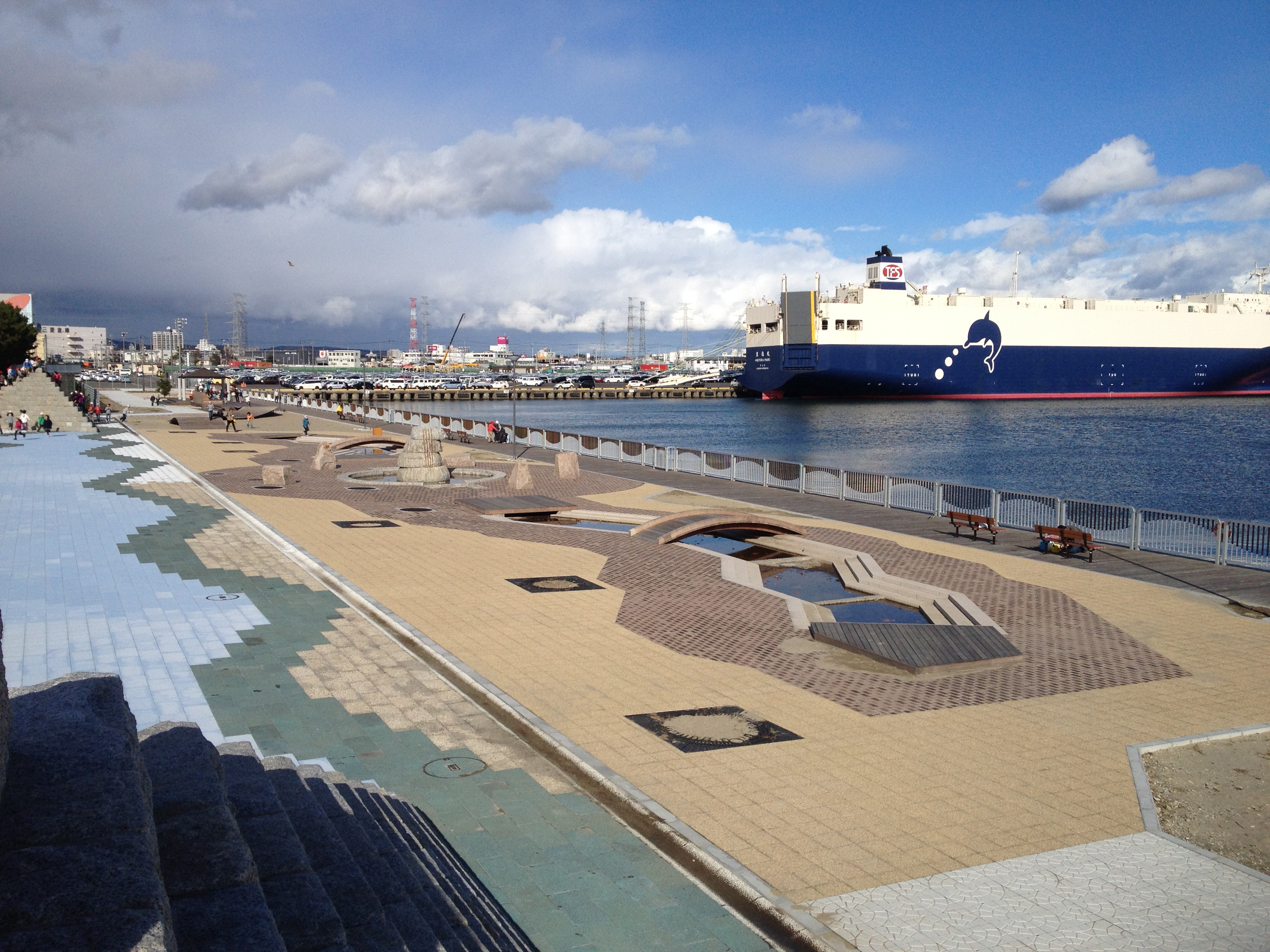
Sendai Port

== Culture ==
=== Streets ===
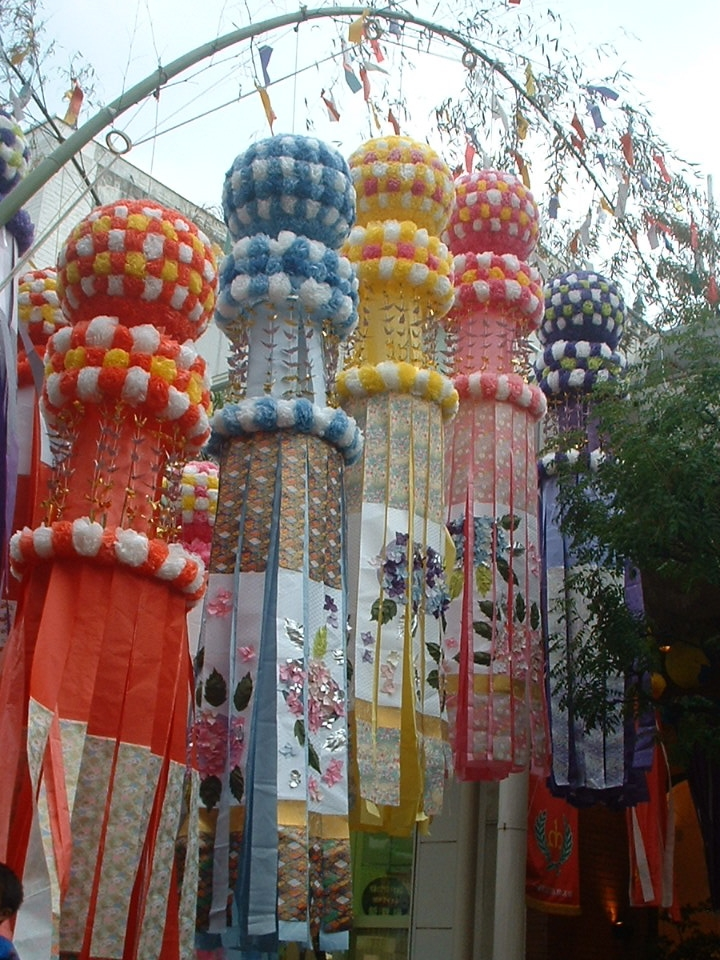
Sendai Tanabata Festival

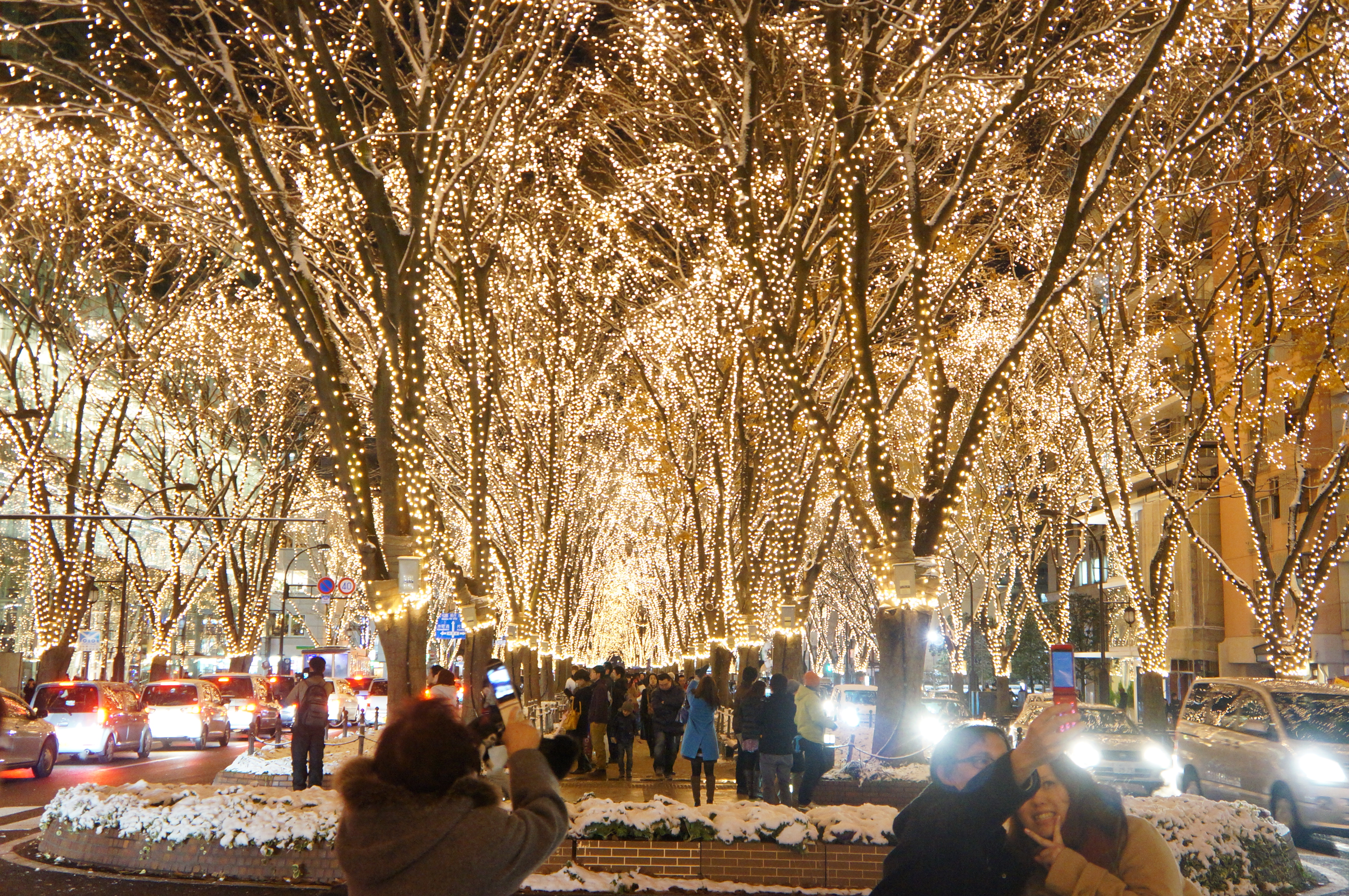
Sendai Pageant of Starlight

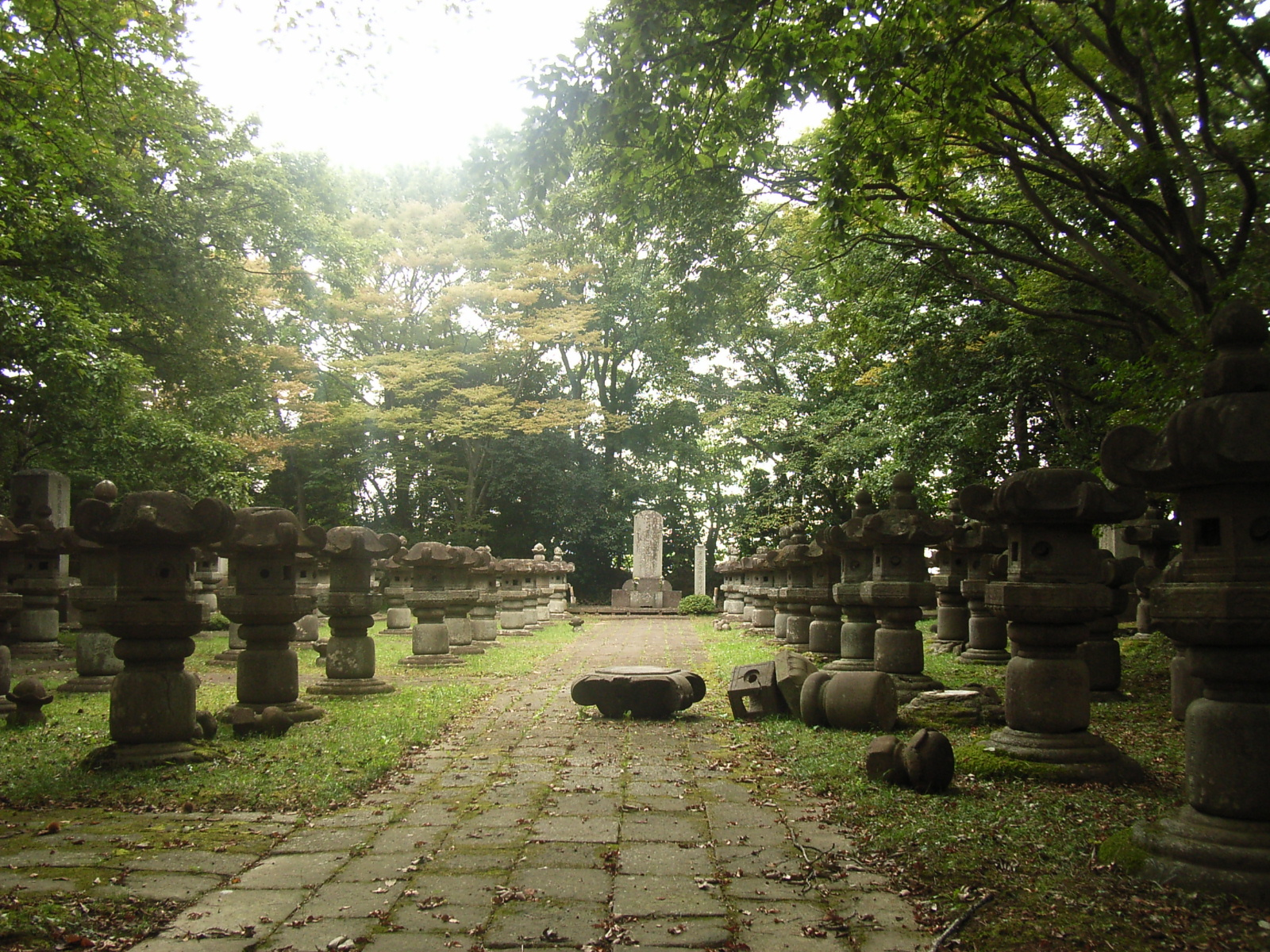
Dainenji

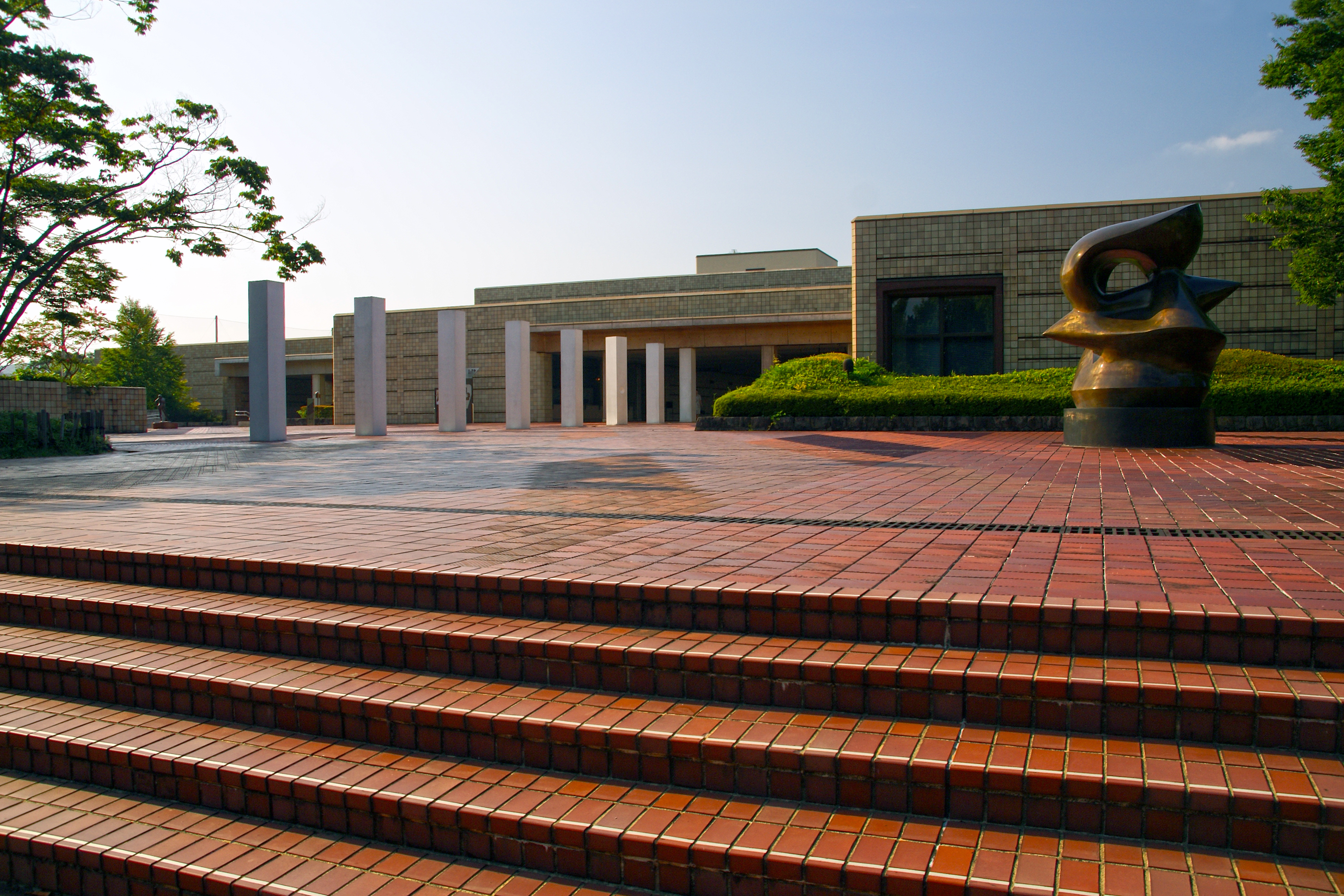
The Miyagi Museum of Art

The most well-known streets in Sendai, Jozenji-Dori (定禅寺通り) and Aoba-Dori (青葉通り), are both lined with Japanese zelkovas. These are symbols of "The City of Trees". Jozenji-Dori has a promenade and a few sculptures. It is a place of relaxation. Many events and festivals, such as the Sendai Pageant of Starlight and the Jozenji Street Jazz Festival, take place on Jozenji-Dori and in Kōtōdai Park (匂当台公園). Aoba-Dori is the main business road in Sendai. Other major roads in the city include Hirose-Dori (ginkgo), and Higashi-Nibancho-Dori.

=== Festivals ===
The most famous festival in Sendai is Tanabata, which attracts more than 2 million visitors every year and is the largest Tanabata Festival in Japan. It is relatively quiet compared to other traditional Japanese festivals, because its main attractions are intricate Tanabata decorations.

The Aoba Matsuri Festival follows more typical Japanese festival traditions, with a mikoshi, floats, a samurai parade, and traditional dancing.

Local people burn their New Year decorations and pray for health in the new year during the Dontosai Festival, the oldest festival in Miyagi Prefecture.

Various contemporary festivals also take place in Sendai, such as the Jōzenji Streetjazz Festival, the Michinoku Yosakoi Festival, and the Sendai Pageant of Starlight. The Jōzenji Streetjazz Festival is one of the largest amateur music festivals in Japan. It began as a jazz festival in 1991, but soon began to accept applications from all genres. The Michinoku Yosakoi festival is a dance festival, derived from the Yosakoi Festival that takes place in Kōchi. Trees in downtown Sendai are decorated with lights during the Sendai Pageant of Starlights. The event provided the idea for the Festival of Lights annually held in Riverside, Sendai's sister city. In 2005, the streets were lit up with one million miniature bulbs.

=== Specialties and crafts ===
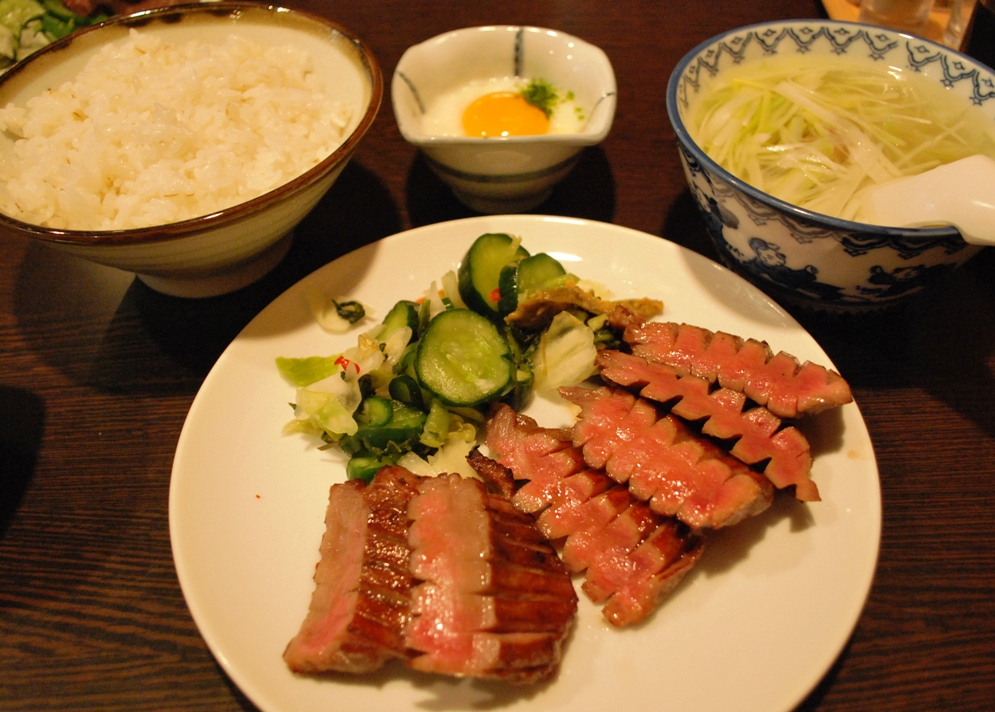
Gyūtan teishoku, a table d'hôte of beef tongue

Sendai is the origin of several foods, including gyūtan (beef tongue, usually grilled), hiyashi chūka (cold Chinese noodles), and robatayaki (Japanese-style barbecue). However, robatayaki was later introduced to Kushiro, which developed and popularized the dish. As a result, many people believe Kushiro is the origin of Robatayaki. Zundamochi (ずんだ餅, mochi balls with sweet, bright green edamame paste), and sasakamaboko (笹かまぼこ, kamaboko shaped like bamboo leaves) are also considered to be Sendai specialties. Sendai is also known for good sashimi, sushi, and sake. This is because Sendai is near several major fishing ports, such as Kesennuma, Ishinomaki, and Shiogama, and the fact that Miyagi Prefecture is a major producer of rice. There are many ramen restaurants in Sendai, and the area is known for a particular spicy miso ramen. Also, Sendai station offers the most types of ekiben of any station in Japan. In autumn, many people organise Imonikai, a sort of picnic by the river which involves making a potato stew called Imoni. In winter, restaurants offer seri-nabe (せり鍋), a regional specialty that consists of seri and various ingredients mixed in a hotpot.

Many crafts from Sendai were originally created under the influence of the Date family during the Edo period. Examples are Sendai Hira, a hand woven silk fabric, Tsutsumiyaki pottery, and Yanagiu Washi paper. However, some crafts, such as umoregi zaiku (crafts created from fossil wood) were developed by low-ranking samurai who needed side jobs to survive. Kokeshi dolls were popularized by hot spring resorts that sold them as gifts. Some relatively recent developments include Sendai Tsuishu lacquerware and Tamamushinuri lacquerware, both of which were developed after the Meiji Restoration.

Sendai was also known for its production of Tansu, clothing drawers made from wood with elaborate ironwork.

== Sites of interest ==
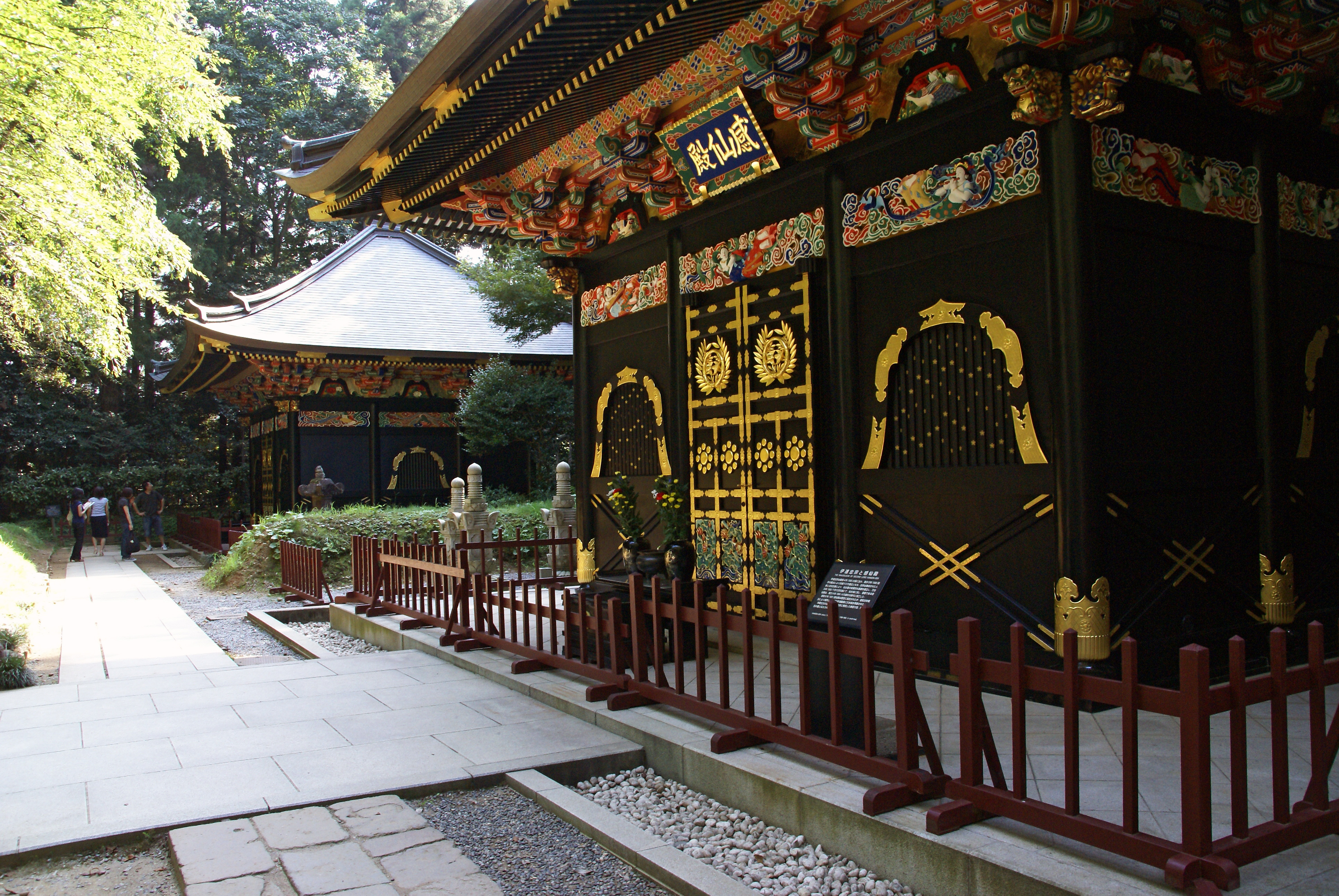
Zuihōden

Sendai is home to historical sites related to the Date clan. The ruins of Sendai Castle are close to downtown on Aobayama, which also gives a panoramic view of the city. The Zuihōden is the tomb of Date Masamune and is home to artifacts related to the Date family. It is on a hill called Kyogamine, which is the traditional resting place for Date family members. In Aoba-ku, the Ōsaki Hachimangū shaden, built in 1607 by Date Masamune, is designated a National Treasure. Mutsu Kokubun-ji Yakushidō is the provincial temple of Mutsu Province.

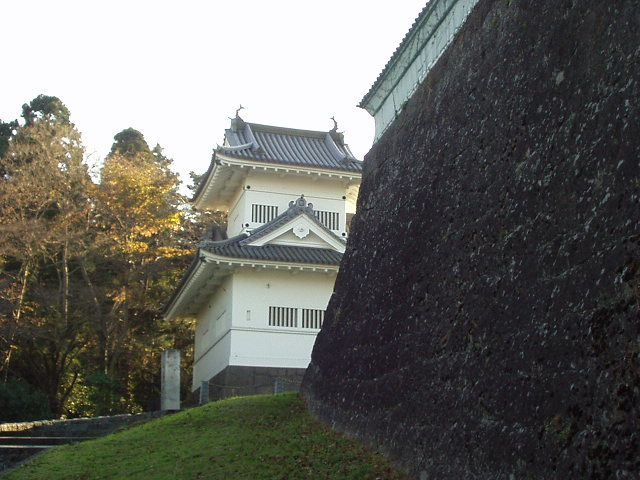
Sendai Castle

Newer historical sites include the former home of Doi Bansui, a famous lyricist, and a monument at Sendai City Museum that commemorates the Chinese writer Lu Xun. Another statue of Lu Xun can be found in the Tohoku University Katahira Campus, where Lu Xun studied medical science. Older historical sites include the Tōmizuka Tomb, a tomb that dates back to the late 4th century or early 5th century, and the Tomizawa Preserved Forest site, where the excavated remains of a Stone Age human settlement (Upper Palaeolithic – roughly 20,000 years ago) have been protected by a large museum structure, built in 1996. The nearby Site of Tagajō was an important early fort and administrative centre.

=== Museums ===
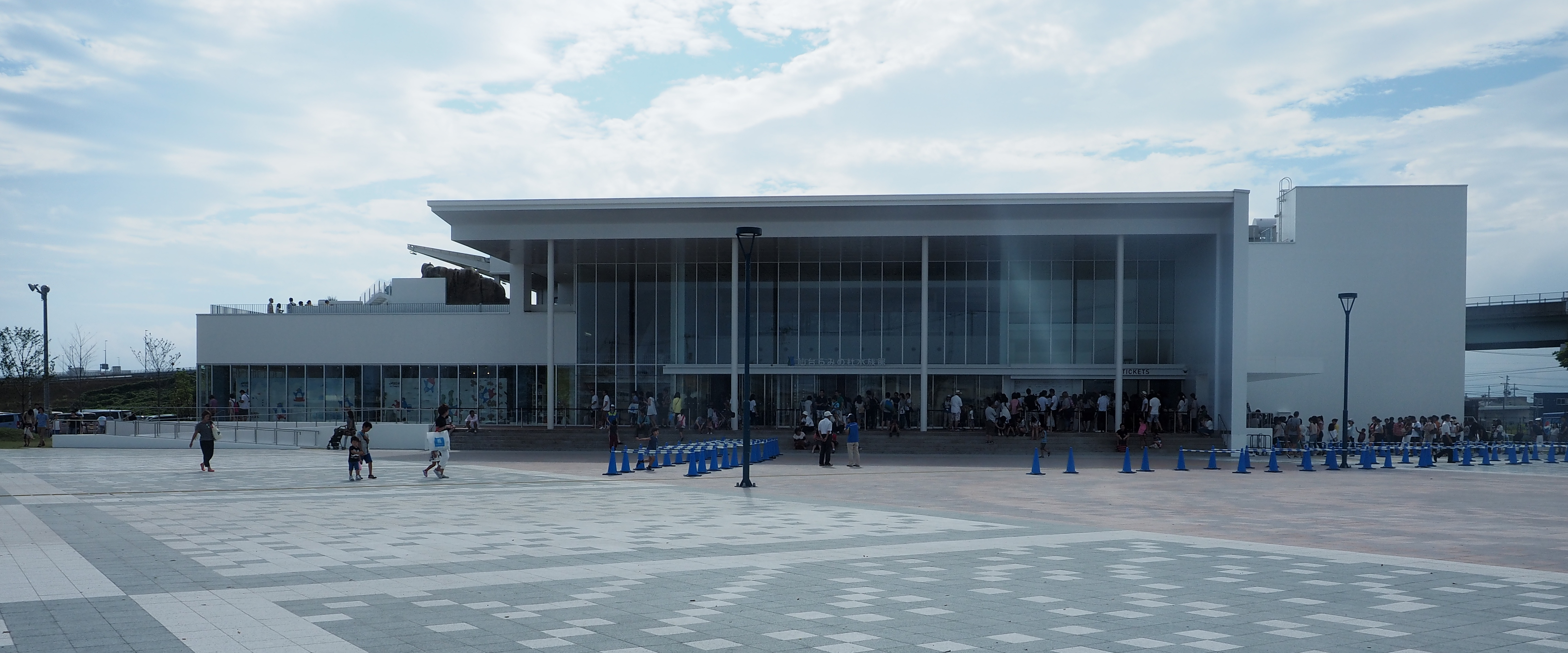
Sendai Umino-Mori Aquarium

Sendai City Museum displays artifacts related to the Date family and the history of Sendai. Date Masamune's famous suit of armour and artifacts related to Hasekura Tsunenaga's visit to Rome (National Treasures of Japan) are sometimes on display.

The Sendai Umino-Mori Aquarium, which opened in 2015 as a successor to the Marinepia Matsushima Aquarium, is focusing on raising the Sanriku fish, the blue sharks.

The Miyagi Museum of Art is Sendai's largest art museum. A total of 24 sculptures have been installed in public locations in Sendai through its 'City of Sculptures' project.

The Sendai City Tomizawa Site Museum in the southern part of the city preserves a fossilized forest where the remains of human habitation from 20,000 years ago can be seen.

The Sendai City War Reconstruction Memorial Hall is dedicated to remembering the air raid of July 1945 in which most of Sendai was destroyed.

Other museums include the 3M Sendai City Science Museum, Sendai Literature Museum and Tohoku University's Museum of Natural History.

=== Natural sites ===
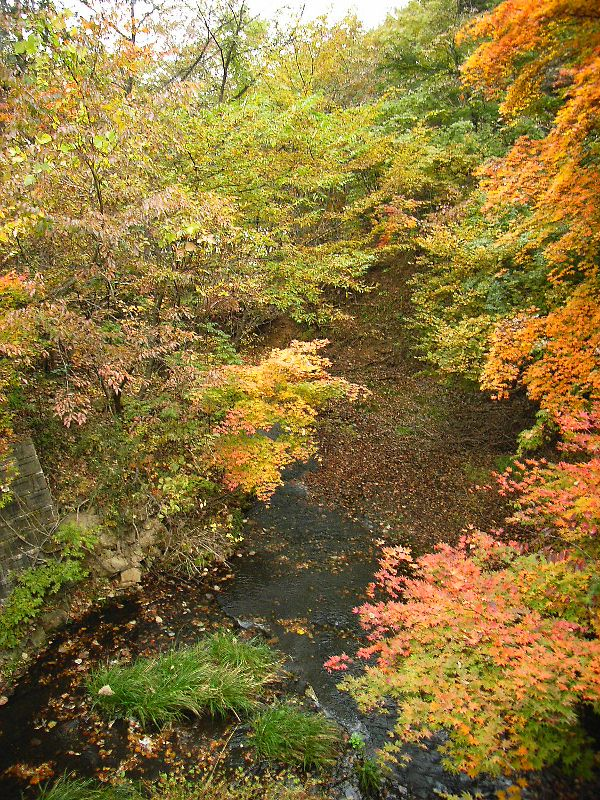
Saikachi Gawa

Western Sendai is home to many sites of natural beauty, many of them found around Akiu Onsen and Sakunami, which are hot spring resorts. Sites around the Akiu area include the Akiu Great Falls, sometimes counted as one of Japan's three great waterfalls, and the Rairai Gorge, known for its autumn colours. The Futakuchi Gorge contains waterfalls that have been designated as natural monuments and the Banji Cliffs, an example of columnar basalt.

The Sakunami area is also known for its natural environment, with cherry blossoms in the spring, and autumnal colours. The nearby Hōmei Shijuhachi Taki Falls is the name of waterfalls found in the higher reaches of the Hirose River. The origin of the name "Hōmei" (鳳鳴, "Chinese phoenix cry") is said to come from ancient local inhabitants' claim that the sound of the waterfalls was similar to the legendary bird's call.

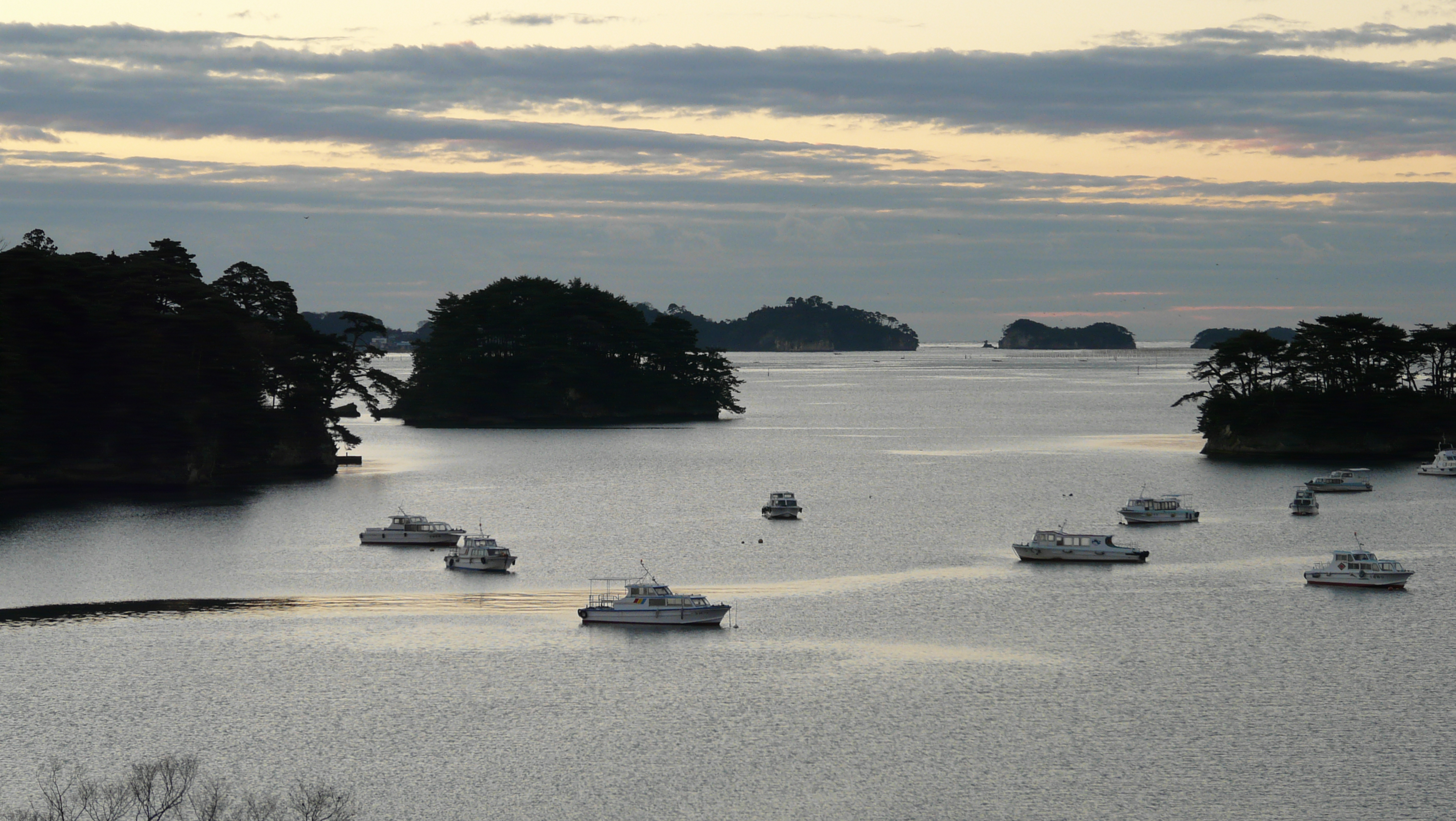
Matsushima

The Tatsunokuchi Gorge offers a view of a petrified wood next to the Otamaya-bashi bridge. Nishi Park and Tsutsujigaoka Park are appreciated for their cherry blossom in the spring. The Hirose River and the Gamo tideland are home to diverse wildlife.

Matsushima, which is one of the Three Views of Japan, is near Sendai, in Matsushima.

=== Other sites ===
Sendai Mediatheque is a multipurpose facility that houses the city library, galleries, and film studio facilities open for use by the general public. The building was designed by Toyo Ito and is known for its innovative architecture.

The AER Building, Miyagi Prefectural Office, and SS30 Building have observation decks that offer panoramic views. The Sendai Trust Tower is the tallest building in Tohoku and Hokkaido.

Uminomori Aquarium opened in July 2015, built near the Port of Sendai.

The Sendai Daikannon is an approximately 100 m (328 ft) high Kannon statue. The statue was built during Japan's bubble economy by a now defunct company. It was once the tallest statue in the world.

Sendai also contains a Peace Pagoda, built by Nipponzan-Myōhōji-Daisanga in 1974.

== Religion ==
=== Buddhism ===
Buddhist temples in Sendai include Mutsu Kokubun-ji, Saihō-ji, and Mutsu Kokubun-niji.

=== Shinto ===
Shinto shrines in Sendai include Miyagiken Gokoku Shrine, Tsubonuma Hachiman Shrine, Futahashira Shrine, and Sendai Tōshōgū, a memorial shrine of Tokugawa Ieyasu.

=== Catholicism ===
The Catholic Church has been associated with Sendai since 1613, the year in which Date Masamune, daimyō of Sendai, built a galleon to send an embassy to the Pope in Rome headed by Hasekura Tsunenaga. Although the embassy was successful in its aim of establishing relations with the Holy See, Masamune's plans were frustrated by the suppression of Christianity in Japan. The Diocese of Sendai (previously the Diocese of Hakodate) was established in 1891, only two years after the promulgation of a new constitution guaranteeing freedom of religion in Japan, in 1889. The Bishop of Sendai currently oversees the four northern prefectures of Miyagi, Fukushima, Iwate and Aomori, serving 11,152 Catholics in 56 parishes. Mototerakoji, the Cathedral of the diocese, is located a few blocks north of Sendai Station.

== Sports ==
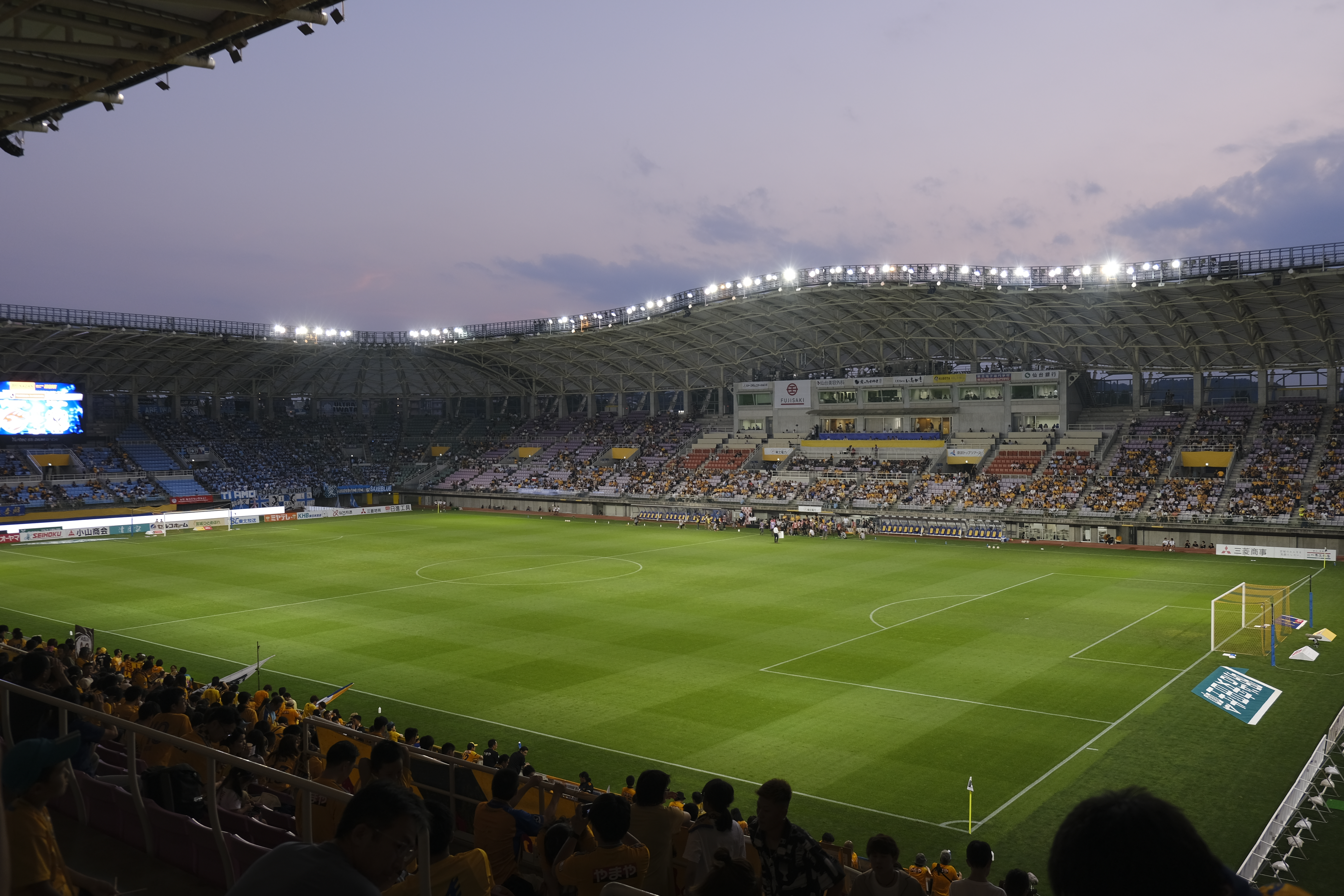
Yurtec Stadium Sendai

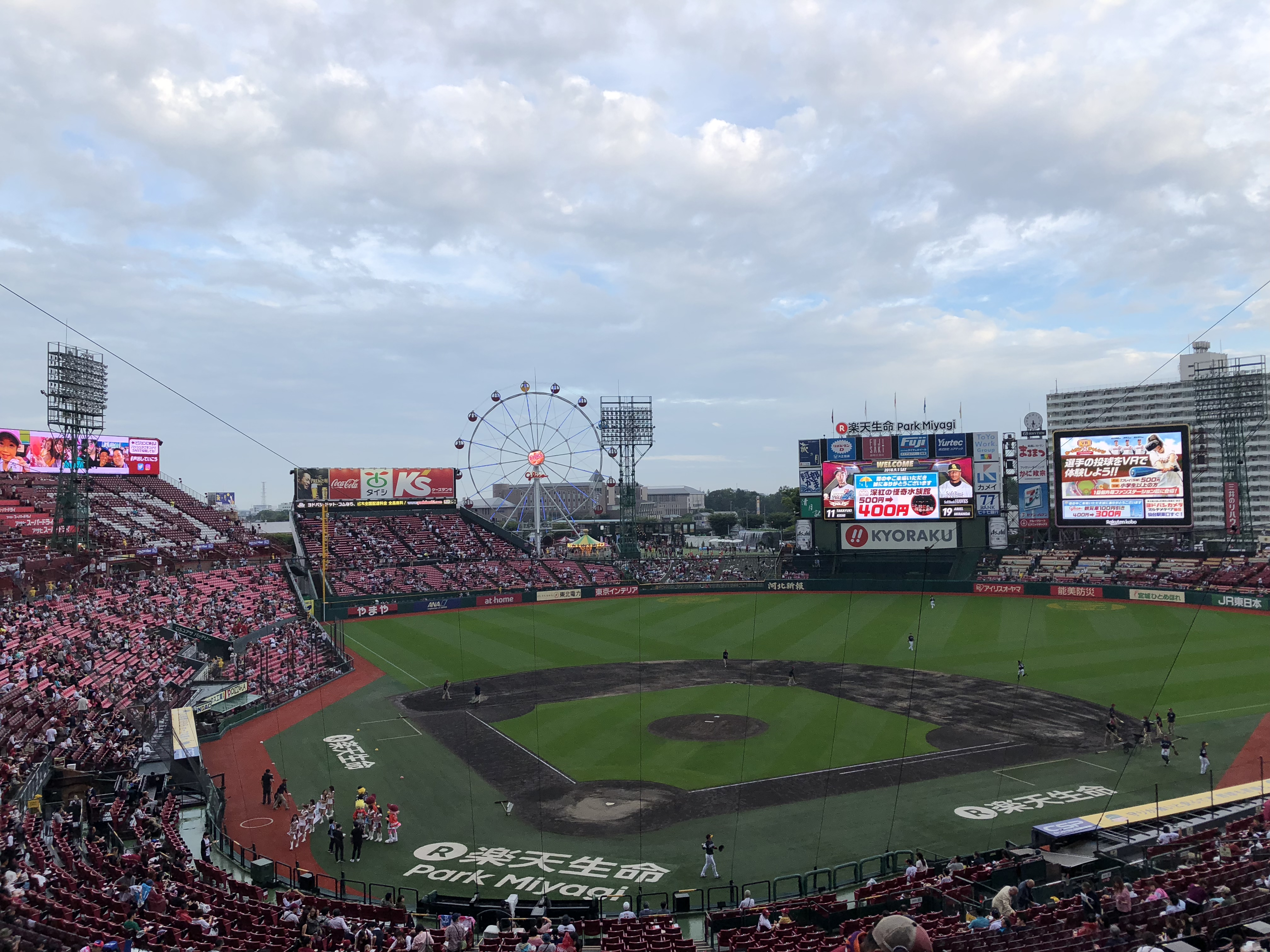
Miyagi Baseball Stadium

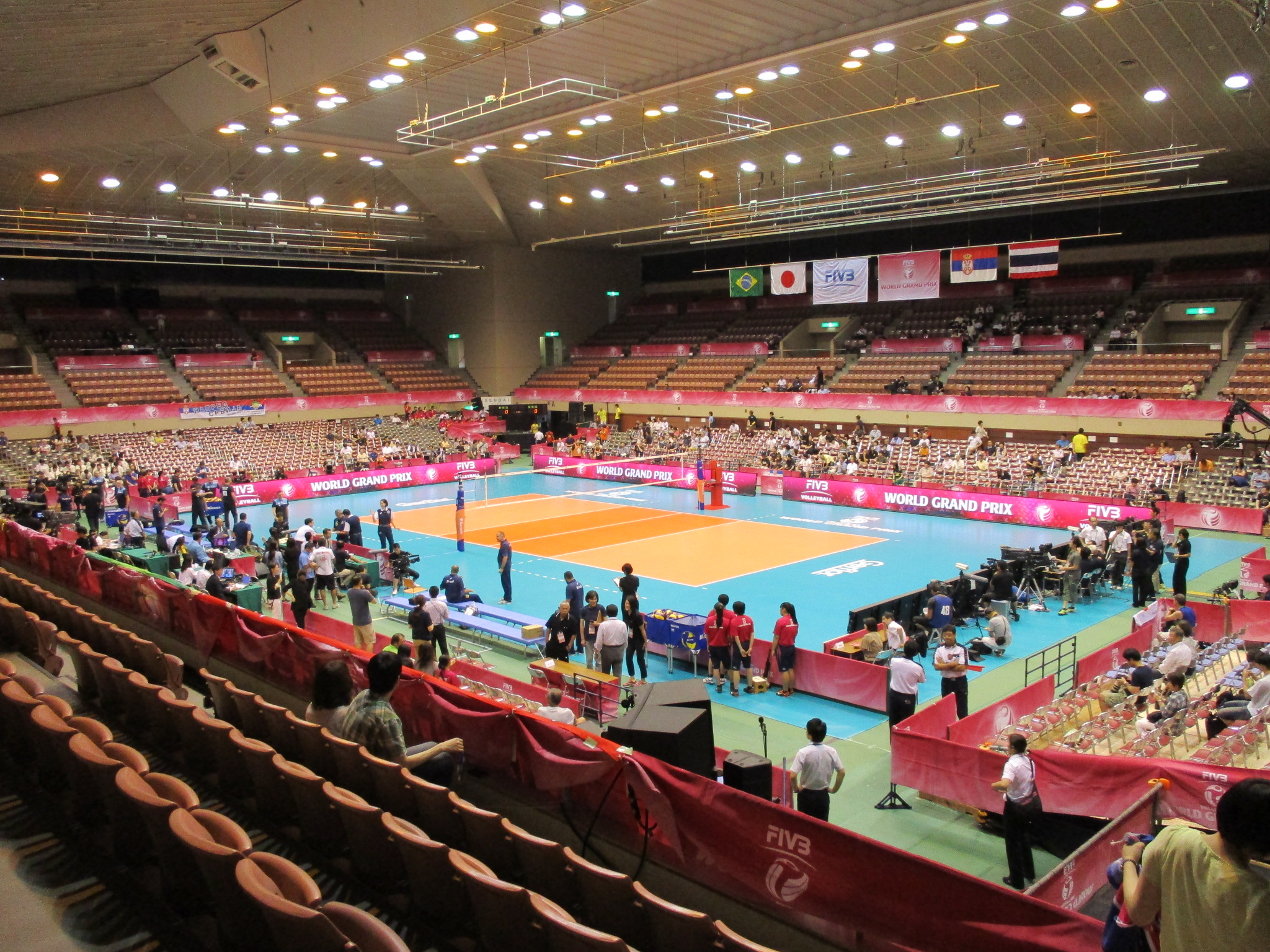
Kamei Arena Sendai

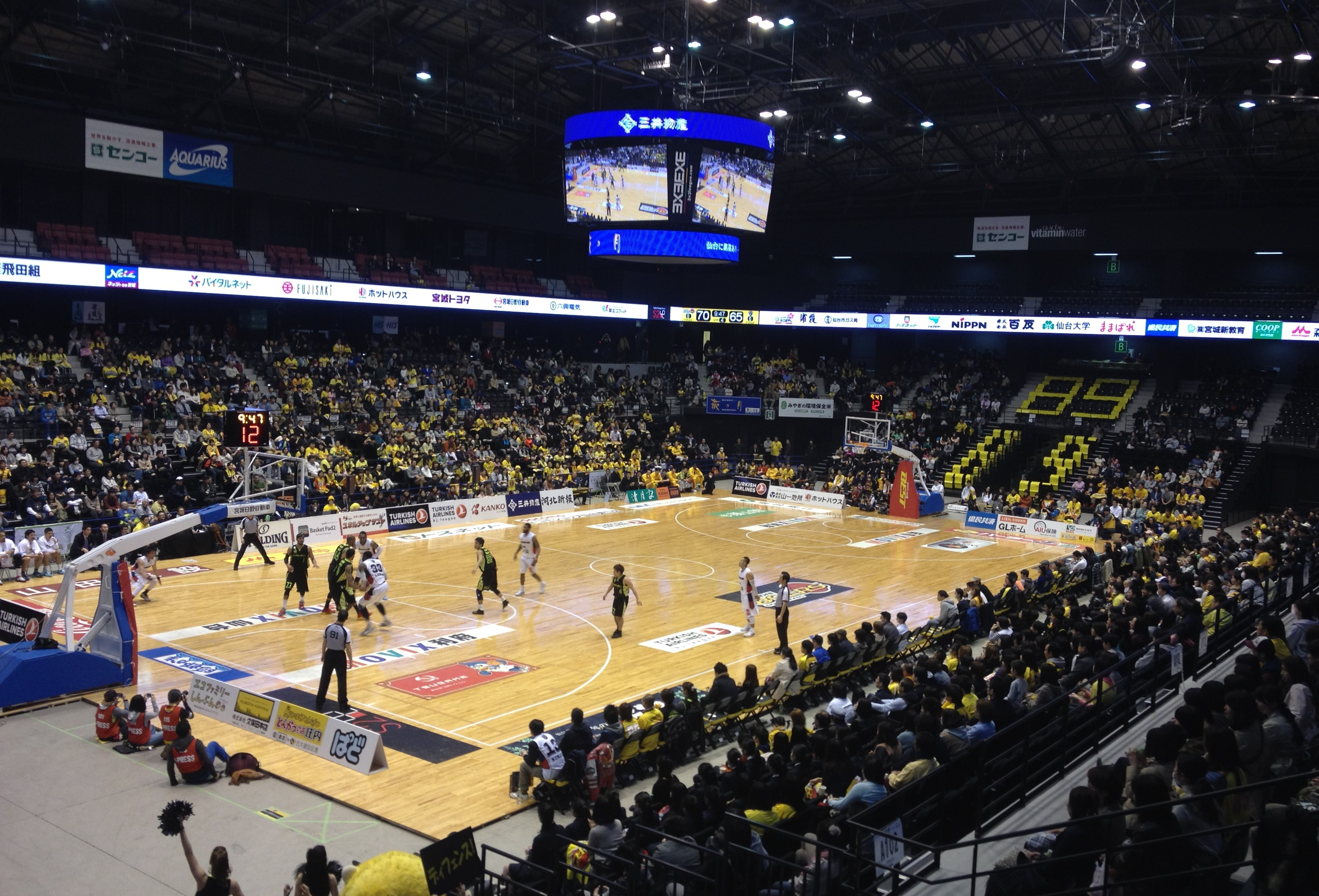
Xebio Arena Sendai

Although the Lotte Orions briefly used Sendai as a temporary home for the franchise from 1973 to 1977, the city was largely ignored by professional sports until 1994. In that year, the Tohoku Electric Power football team was changed into a club team, Brummel Sendai, with the goal of eventually being promoted into the J.League. The team achieved this goal when the J. League expanded in 1999 with the creation of a second division. The name of the team was simultaneously changed to Vegalta Sendai. Currently the city also host semi-professional outfit Sony Sendai FC.

In 2005, the number of professional sports teams based in Sendai suddenly increased to three. The Tohoku Rakuten Golden Eagles was introduced as a new Pacific League baseball franchise after widely publicized turmoil involving the merger of the Kintetsu Buffaloes and the Orix Blue Wave developed into the first strike in Nippon Professional Baseball. Additionally, the Japan Basketball League, which began its inaugural season in November 2005, included the Sendai 89ers among its first six teams.

Annual sporting events include the Sendai Cup, an international football tournament for U-18 teams, and the Sendai International Half Marathon. In 2006 of the Sendai International half marathon, Mizuki Noguchi, who won the women's marathon gold medal at the 2004 Athens Olympic Games, took part in and won the race in a surprising course record.

Various sporting venues can be found in Sendai, such as Hitomebore Stadium Miyagi (venue of 2002 FIFA World Cup), Yurtec Stadium Sendai, Miyagi Baseball Stadium, Sendai City Gymnasium, Sendai Athletic Stadium, Shellcom Sendai and Sendai Hi-Land Raceway. The city is also known as the origin of figure skating in Japan, and both 2006 Olympic gold medalist Shizuka Arakawa and two-time Olympic gold medalist (2014, 2018) Yuzuru Hanyu trained in Sendai during their childhood. Tohoku Fukushi University and Sendai Ikuei Gakuen Senior High School are well known for their strong sports programs, the latter for baseball.

In 2006, Sendai hosted some games of the 2006 FIBA World Championship. Before that, the city had some experience at hosting international basketball events such as the 1994 and 2004 editions of the FIBA Women's Asia Cup. Sendai Girls' Pro Wrestling is a joshi wrestling company based in sendai.

=== Baseball ===
- Tohoku Rakuten Golden Eagles (Pa.League)

=== Basketball ===
- Sendai 89ers (B.League)

=== Football ===
- MyNavi Sendai (WE.League)
- Vegalta Sendai (J.League)

=== Futsal ===
- Voscuore Sendai (F.League)

=== Volleyball ===
- Ligare Sendai (V.League)

== International relations ==
=== Sister cities ===
Sendai has a long history of international relationships. Its affiliation with Riverside, California dates back to March 9, 1957, and is the world's first. Sendai is twinned with:

- Acapulco, Guerrero, Mexico (since 1973)
- Changchun, China (since 1980)
- Dallas, United States (since 1997)
- Gwangju, South Korea (since 2002)
- Minsk, Belarus (since 1973)
- Rennes, France (since 1967)
- Riverside, United States (since 1957)

=== Friendship cities ===
Sendai also cooperates with:

- Oulu, Finland (since 2005)
- Tainan, Taiwan (since 2006)

=== International events ===
The Sendai International Music Competition takes place every three years, welcoming participants from around the world.

Sendai has hosted international conferences about disaster management, as is recognized as a model city for disaster risk prevention.

== Notable people ==
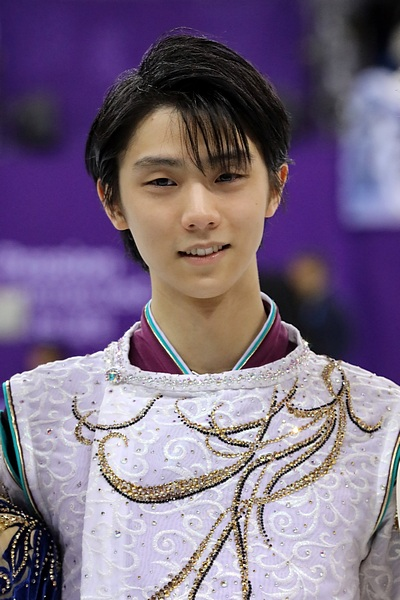
Yuzuru Hanyu

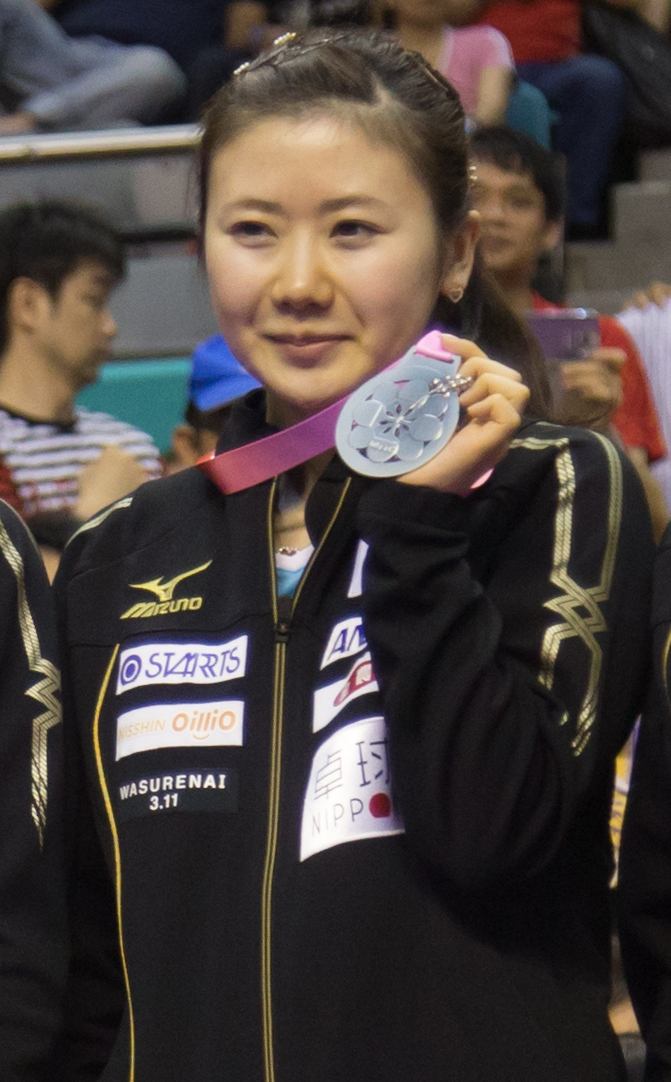
Ai Fukuhara

- Miho Arakawa, voice actress
- Shizuka Arakawa, figure skater and Olympic Champion (2006)
- Hirohiko Araki, manga artist; creator of JoJo's Bizarre Adventure. The fictional city of Morioh that appears in JoJo's Bizarre Adventure is based on Sendai.
- Chris Broad, British YouTuber based in Sendai
- Mone Chiba, figure skater and 2026 Worlds silver medalist
- Dash Chisako Wrestler in sendai girls pro wrestling
- Mika Doi, voice actress
- Ai Fukuhara, table tennis player
- Yuzuru Hanyu, figure skater and two-time Olympic champion (2014-2018). Appointed as Sendai Tourism Ambassador since 2014.
- Tomokazu Harimoto, table tennis player
- Yui Hasegawa, footballer for the Japan national team
- Eugen Herrigel lectured at Tohoku Imperial University from 1924 until 1929
- Sharla Hinskens, Canadian YouTuber based in Sendai
- Kanata Hongō, actor and model
- Junichi Inagaki, singer-songwriter
- Ayumi Ishida, former member of girl-group Morning Musume
- Karen Iwata, member of girl-group AKB48
- Yoko Kanno, composer
- Monkey Majik, band, formed and based in Sendai
- Hikaru Minegishi, footballer
- Yūsei Oda, voice actor
- Sendai Sachiko former wrestler in sendai girls pro wrestling
- Akitoshi Saito, Japanese professional wrestler who currently works for Pro Wrestling Noah
- Minene Sakurano, manga artist; creator of Mamotte Shugogetten
- Sandwichman, comedy duo consisting of Mikio Date and Takeshi Tomizawa
- Kimi Sato, composer
- Shun Sato, figure skater, 2019 Junior Grand Prix Final Champion, and Olympic silver and bronze medalist (2026)
- Satomi Satō, voice actress
- Somei Satoh, composer
- Sendai Shirō – intellectually disabled man worshipped as a Hitogami associated with business prosperity
- Sasaki Toyoju, feminist and anti-prostitution activist
- Mimori Yusa, singer-songwriter
