= List of living national treasures of Japan (performing arts) =

The List of living national treasures of Japan (performing arts) contains all the individuals and groups certified as living national treasures by the Ministry of Education, Culture, Sports, Science and Technology of the government of Japan in the category of the performing arts (芸能, geinō).

The performing arts are divided into eight categories: Gagaku, Noh, Bunraku, Kabuki, Kumi Odori, Music, Dance, and Drama. The categories are subdivided into a number of subcategories, usually by role or instrument.

Those working in the performing arts are eligible for recognition either individually (Individual Certification) or as part of a group (General Certification).

== List of current designated individuals (performing arts) ==
=== Noh ===
Name	Born	Category	Subcategory	Year Designated
Akiyo Tomoeda (友枝昭世)	1940	Noh	Shite	2008
Genshō Umewaka (梅若玄祥) (Note: Real Name: Yoshimasa Umewaka (Japanese: 梅若善政, Hepburn: Umewaka Yoshimasa).)	1948	Noh	Shite	2014
Shirō Nomura (野村四郎)	1936	Noh	Shite	2016
Bunzō Ōtsuki (大槻文藏)	1942	Noh	Shite	2016
Genjirō Ōkura (大倉源次郎)	1957	Noh	Kotsuzumi	2017
Tadao Kamei (亀井忠雄)	1941	Noh	Ōtsuzumi	2002
Takashi Kakihara (柿原崇志)	1940	Noh	Ōtsuzumi	2018
Gentarō Mishima (三島元太郎)	1936	Noh	Taiko	2014
Tarō Nomura (野村太良), alias Man Nomura (野村萬)	1930	Noh	Kyōgen	1997
Jirō Nomura (野村二朗), alias Mansaku Nomura II (二世野村万作)	1931	Noh	Kyōgen	2007
Tōjirō Yamamoto (山本東次郎) (Note: Real Name: Norihisa Yamamoto (Japanese: 山本則寿, Hepburn: Yamamoto Norihisa).)	1937	Noh	Kyōgen	2012
Shime Shigeyama II (二世茂山七五三) (Note: Real Name: Shingo Shigeyama (Japanese: 茂山眞吾, Hepburn: Shigeyama Shingo).)	1947	Noh	Kyōgen	2023

=== Bunraku ===
Name	Born	Category	Subcategory	Year Designated
Sakitayū Toyotake (豊竹咲太夫) (Note: Real Name: Yōzō Ikuta (Japanese: 生田陽三, Hepburn: Ikuta Yōzō).)	1944	Bunraku	Tayū	2019
Seiji Tsuruzawa (鶴沢清治) (Note: Real Name: Hiroshi Nakanojima (Japanese: 中能島浩, Hepburn: Nakanojima Hiroshi).)	1945	Bunraku	Shamisen	2007
Minosuke Yoshida III (三世吉田簑助) (Note: Real Name: Katsuyoshi Hirao (Japanese: 平尾勝義, Hepburn: Hirao Katsuyoshi).)	1933	Bunraku	Puppeteer	1994
Kazuo Yoshida (吉田和生)	1947	Bunraku	Puppeteer	2007
Tamao Yoshida II (二代目吉田玉男) (Note: Real Name: Tamame Yoshida (Japanese: 吉田玉女, Hepburn: Yoshida Tamame).)	1953	Bunraku	Puppeteer	2023

=== Kabuki ===
Name	Born	Category	Subcategory	Year Designated
Kataoka Nizaemon XV (十五代目片岡仁左衛門) (Note: Real Name: Takao Kataoka (Japanese: 片岡孝夫, Hepburn: Kataoka Takao).)	1944	Kabuki	Tachiyaku	2015
Onoe Kikugorō VII (七代目尾上菊五郎) (Note: Real Name: Hideyuki Terajima (Japanese: 寺島秀幸, Hepburn: Terajima Hideyuki).)	1942	Kabuki	Tachiyaku	2003
Nakamura Tōzō VI (六代目中村東蔵) (Note: Real Name: Hitoshi Kono (Japanese: 河野均, Hepburn: Kono Hitoshi).)	1938	Kabuki	Wakiyaku	2016
Takemoto Aoidayū II (二代目竹本葵太夫) (Note: Real Name: Shingo Yanase (Japanese: 柳瀬信吾, Hepburn: Yanase Shingo).)	1960	Kabuki	Takemoto	2019
Tobaya Richō VII (七代目鳥羽屋里長) (Note: Real Name: Hisao Kawahara (Japanese: 川原寿夫, Hepburn: Kawahara Hisao).)	1936	Kabuki	Nagauta	2002
Bandō Tamasaburō V (五代目坂東玉三郎)	1950	Kabuki	Onnagata	2012
Nakamura Baigyoku IV (四代目中村梅玉) (Note: Real Name: Toshiyuki Kawamura (Japanese: 河村順之, Hepburn: Kawamura Toshiyuki).)	1946	Kabuki	Tachiyaku	2022
Nakamura Karoku V (五代目中村歌六) (Note: Real Name: Shin'ichi Ogawa (Japanese: 小川進一, Hepburn: Ogawa Shin'ichi).)	1950	Kabuki	Tachiyaku	2023

=== Kumi Odori ===
Name	Born	Category	Subcategory	Year Designated
Nōhō Miyagi (宮城能鳳) (Note: Real Name: Masakichi Tokumura (Japanese: 徳村正吉, Hepburn: Tokumura Masakichi).)	1938	Kumi Odori	Tachikata	2006
Tokutarō Shiroma (城間徳太郎)	1933	Kumi Odori	Uta Sanshin	2005
Kishun Nishie (西江喜春)	1940	Kumi Odori	Uta Sanshin	2011
Satoshi Higa (比嘉聰)	1952	Kumi Odori	Taiko	2017

=== Music ===
Name	Born	Category	Subcategory	Year Designated
Kyokusui Okumura (奥村旭翠)	1951	Music	Biwa	2016
Shōin Yamase III (三代目山勢松韻) (Note: Real Name: Shitsuko Kihara (Japanese: 木原司都子, Hepburn: Kihara Shitsuko).)	1932	Music	Koto	2001
Keisuke Zenyōji (善養寺 恵介)	1964	Music	Shakuhachi	2025
Hōzan Nomura (野村 峰山)	1957	Music	Shakuhachi	2022
Kisaburō Kineya XV (十五代目杵屋喜三郎) (Note: Real Name: Yasuhiro Kineya (Japanese: 杵家安廣, Hepburn: Kineya Yasuhiro).)	1923	Music	Nagauta (Vocals)	1997
Tetsuo Miyata (宮田哲男)	1934	Music	Nagauta (Vocals)	1998
Masatarō Imafuji (今藤政太郎) (Note: Real Name: Shoichi Nakagawa (Japanese: 中川昇一, Hepburn: Nakagawa Shōichi).)	1935	Music	Nagauta (Shamisen)	2013
Katsukuni Kineya (杵屋勝国) (Note: Real Name: Terukuni Mutaguchi (Japanese: 牟田口照國, Hepburn: Mutaguchi Terukuni).)	1945	Music	Nagauta (Shamisen)	2019
Meishō Tōsha II (二代目藤舎名生) (Note: Real Name: Isao Nakagawa (Japanese: 中川勲, Hepburn: Nakagawa Isao).)	1941	Music	Nagauta (Narimono)	2019
Komanosuke Takemoto (竹本駒之助) (Note: Real Name: Etsuko Ueda (Japanese: 上田悦子, Hepburn: Ueda Etsuko).)	1935	Music	Gidayūbushi (Vocals)	1999
Shibun Uji VII (七代目宇治紫文) (Note: Real Name: Fuji Umezu (Japanese: 梅津ふじ, Hepburn: Umedzu Fuji).)	1933	Music	Icchūbushi (Vocals)	1999
Bunchō Uji (宇治文蝶)	1935	Music	Icchūbushi (Shamisen)	2001
Senko Yamabiko (山彦千子)	1946	Music	Katōbushi (Shamisen)	2009
Senroku Miyazono II (二代目宮園千碌)	1944	Music	Miyazonobushi (Vocals)	2007
Wakasanojō Tsuruga III (三代目鶴賀若狭掾)	1938	Music	Shinnaibushi (Vocals)	2001
Nakasaburō Shinnai VI (六代目新内仲三郎)	1940	Music	Shinnaibushi (Shamisen)	2001
Eiju Tokiwazu (常磐津英寿)	1927	Music	Tokiwazubushi (Shamisen)	1992
Eijudayū Kiyomoto (清元清寿太夫)	1935	Music	Kiyomotobushi (Vocals)	2003
Umekichi Kiyomoto IV (四代目清元梅吉)	1932	Music	Kiyomotobushi (Shamisen)	2013
Chōichi Terukina (照喜名朝一)	1932	Music	Ryūkyū's classical music	2000
Ichio Nakamura (中村一雄)	1946	Music	Ryūkyū's classical music	2019
Seikin Tomiyama II (二代目富山清琴)	1950	Music	Jiuta	2009

=== Dance ===
Name	Born	Category	Subcategory	Year Designated
Senzō Nishikawa X (西川扇藏（10代）)	1928	Dance	Kabuki-mai	1999
Yachiyo Inoue V (五世井上八千代)	1956	Dance	Kyō-mai	2015

=== Drama ===
Name	Born	Category	Subcategory	Year Designated
Shōri Kanda III (三代目神田松鯉)	1942	Drama	Kōdan	2019

== List of past designated individuals (performing arts) ==
=== Noh ===
Name	Born	Died	Category	Subcategory	Year Designated
Roppeita Kita XIV (14世喜多六平太)	1874	1971	Noh	Shite	1955
Kenzō Kondo (近藤乾三)	1890	1988	Noh	Shite	1966
Michio Sakurama (桜間道雄)	1897	1983	Noh	Shite	1970
Tokuzō Gotō (後藤得三)	1897	1991	Noh	Shite	1970
Yazaemon Teshima (豊嶋弥平)	1899	1978	Noh	Shite	1977
Susumu Takahashi (高橋進)	1902	1984	Noh	Shite	1978
Shigeo Matsumoto (松本惠雄)	1915	2003	Noh	Shite	1990
Tetsunojō Kanze VIII (八世観世銕之丞)	1931	2000	Noh	Shite	1995
Kikuo Awaya (粟谷菊生)	1922	2006	Noh	Shite	1996
Hirotarō Katayama (片山博太郎), alias Yūsetsu Katayama (片山幽雪)	1930	2015	Noh	Shite	2001
Izumi Mikawa (三川泉)	1922	2016	Noh	Shite	2003
Shigeyoshi Mori (森茂好)	1916	1991	Noh	Waki	1961
Kenzō Matsumoto (松本謙三)	1899	1980	Noh	Waki	1966
Yaichi Hōshō (宝生弥一)	1908	1985	Noh	Waki	1981
Kan Hōshō (寳生閑), alias Kan Hōshō (宝生閑)	1934	2016	Noh	Waki	1994
Daigorō Fujita (藤田大五郎)	1915	2008	Noh	Fue	1971
Hisayuki Issō (一噌仙幸)	1940	2018	Noh	Fue	2009
Yoshimitsu Kō (幸祥光)	1892	1977	Noh	Kotsuzumi	1955
Yoshi Kōnobu (幸宣佳)	1896	1977	Noh	Kotsuzumi	1974
Hisashi Usawa (鵜沢寿)	1908	1997	Noh	Kotsuzumi	1982
Hiroshi Sowa (曾和博朗)	1925	2015	Noh	Kotsuzumi	1998
Osamu Kitamura (北村治)	1936	2012	Noh	Kotsuzumi	2003
Kyūen Kawasaki (川崎九淵)	1874	1961	Noh	Ōtsuzumi	1955
Toshio Kamei (亀井俊雄)	1896	1969	Noh	Ōtsuzumi	1968
Haruo Yasufuku (安福春雄)	1907	1983	Noh	Ōtsuzumi	1970
Noritake Seo (瀬尾乃武)	1899	1997	Noh	Ōtsuzumi	1984
Tatsuo Yasufuku (安福建雄)	1938	2017	Noh	Ōtsuzumi	1998
Toyoji Kakimoto (柿本豊次)	1893	1989	Noh	Taiko	1968
Soemon Konbaru XXII (二十二世金春惣右衛門)	1924	2014	Noh	Taiko	1993
Yagorō Zenchiku (善竹弥五郎)	1883	1965	Noh	Kyōgen	1964
Manzō Nomura VI (六世野村万蔵)	1898	1978	Noh	Kyōgen	1968
Sensaku Shigeyama III (三世茂山千作)	1896	1986	Noh	Kyōgen	1976
Tokurō Miyake IX (九世三宅藤九郎)	1901	1990	Noh	Kyōgen	1979
Shime Shigeyama (茂山七五三), alias Sensaku Shigeyama IV (四世茂山千作)	1919	2013	Noh	Kyōgen	1989

=== Bunraku ===
Name	Born	Died	Category	Subcategory	Year Designated
Sumitayū Takemoto VI (六世竹本住大夫)	1886	1959	Bunraku	Tayū	1955
Yamashironoshōjō Toyotake (豊竹山城少掾)	1878	1967	Bunraku	Tayū	1955
Tsunatayū Takemoto VIII (八世竹本綱大夫)	1904	1969	Bunraku	Tayū	1955
Wakatayū Toyotake X (十世豊竹若大夫)	1888	1967	Bunraku	Tayū	1962
Koshijidayū Takemoto IV (四世竹本越路大夫)	1913	2002	Bunraku	Tayū	1971
Tsudayū Takemoto IV (四世竹本津大夫)	1916	1987	Bunraku	Tayū	1973
Sumitayū Takemoto VII (七世竹本住大夫)	1924	2018	Bunraku	Tayū	1989
Tsunatayū Takemoto IX (九世竹本綱大夫)	1932	2015	Bunraku	Tayū	2007
Shimatayū Toyotake VIII (八世豊竹嶋大夫)	1932	2020	Bunraku	Tayū	2015
Seiroku Tsuruzawa IV (四世鶴沢清六)	1889	1960	Bunraku	Shamisen	1955
Kanji Tsuruzawa VI (六世鶴沢寛治)	1887	1974	Bunraku	Shamisen	1962
Kizaemon Nozawa (二世野沢喜左衛門)	1891	1976	Bunraku	Shamisen	1962
Matsunosuke Nozawa (野沢松之輔)	1902	1975	Bunraku	Shamisen	1972
Yashichi Takezawa X (十世竹沢弥七)	1910	1976	Bunraku	Shamisen	1972
Enza Tsuruzawa V (五世鶴沢燕三)	1914	2001	Bunraku	Shamisen	1985
Kinshi Nozawa (四世野沢錦糸)	1917	1988	Bunraku	Shamisen	1988
Kanji Tsuruzawa VII (七世鶴沢寛治)	1928	2018	Bunraku	Shamisen	1997
Monjūro Kiritake II (二世桐竹紋十郎)	1900	1970	Bunraku	Puppeteer	1965
Tamao Yoshida (吉田玉男)	1919	2006	Bunraku	Puppeteer	1977
Kanjūro Kiritake II (二世桐竹勘十郎)	1920	1986	Bunraku	Puppeteer	1982
Bunjaku Yoshida (吉田文雀)	1928	2016	Bunraku	Puppeteer	1994

=== Kabuki ===
Name	Born	Died	Category	Subcategory	Year Designated
Ichikawa Sadanji III (三代目市川左団次)	1898	1969	Kabuki	Tachiyaku	1964
Ichikawa Jūkai III (三代目市川寿海)	1886	1971	Kabuki	Tachiyaku	1960
Bandō Mitsugorō VIII (八代目坂東三津五郎)	1906	1975	Kabuki	Tachiyaku	1973
Matsumoto Hakuō I (初代松本白鸚)	1910	1982	Kabuki	Tachiyaku	1975
Nakamura Ganjirō II (二代目中村鴈治郎)	1902	1983	Kabuki	Tachiyaku	1967
Nakamura Kanzaburō XVII (十七代目中村勘三郎)	1909	1988	Kabuki	Tachiyaku	1975
Onoe Shōroku II (二代目尾上松緑)	1913	1989	Kabuki	Tachiyaku	1972
Kataoka Nizaemon XIII (十三代目片岡仁左衛門)	1903	1994	Kabuki	Tachiyaku	1972
Ichimura Uzaemon XVII (十七代目市村羽左衛門)	1916	2001	Kabuki	Tachiyaku	1990
Nakamura Tomijūrō V (五代目中村富十郎)	1929	2011	Kabuki	Tachiyaku	1994
Onoe Baikō VII (七代目尾上梅幸)	1915	1995	Kabuki	Onnagata	1968
Nakamura Utaemon VI (六代目中村歌右衛門)	1917	2001	Kabuki	Onnagata	1968
Nakamura Jakuemon IV (四代目中村雀右衛門)	1920	2012	Kabuki	Onnagata	1991
Onoe Taganojō III (三代目尾上多賀之丞)	1887	1978	Kabuki	Fukeonnayaku	1968
Ichikawa Dannosuke VI (六代目市川団之助)	1876	1963	Kabuki	Wakiyaku	1960
Nakamura Matagorō II (二代目中村又五郎)	1914	2009	Kabuki	Wakiyaku	1997
Takemoto Hinadayū V (五代目竹本雛太夫)	1898	1980	Kabuki	Takemoto	1978
Kineya Eizaemon (杵屋栄左衛門)	1894	1982	Kabuki	Nagauta	1978
Yoshimura Gorōji II (二代目芳村五郎治)	1901	1993	Kabuki	Nagauta	1981
Matsushima Jusaburō V (五代目松島寿三郎)	1920	2007	Kabuki	Nagauta	1998
Tanaka Denzaemon XI (十一代目田中伝左衛門)	1907	1997	Kabuki	Hayashi	1978
Mochizuki Bokusei IV (四代目望月朴清)	1934	2007	Kabuki	Hayashi	1998
Nakamura Shikan VII (七代目中村芝翫)	1928	2011	Kabuki	Onnagata	1996
Sakata Tōjūrō IV (四代目坂田藤十郎)	1931	2020	Kabuki	Tachiyaku	1994
Kataoka Hidetarō II (二代目片岡秀太郎)	1941	2021	Kabuki	Wakiyaku	2019
Nakamura Kichiemon II (二代目中村吉右衛門)	1944	2021	Kabuki	Tachiyaku	2011
Kineya Mitarō VII (七代目杵屋巳太郎), known as Kineya Jōgu (杵屋淨貢) after 2012	1937	2022	Kabuki	Nagauta	2007
Sawamura Tanosuke VI (六代目沢村田之助)	1932	2022	Kabuki	Wakiyaku	2002

=== Kumi Odori ===
Name	Born	Died	Category	Subcategory	Year Designated
Mitsufumi Shimabukuro (島袋光史)	1920	2006	Kumi Odori	Taiko	2003

=== Music ===
Name	Born	Died	Category	Subcategory	Year Designated
Kyokusui Yamazaki (山崎旭萃)	1906	2006	Music	Biwa	1995
Judō Nōtomi (納富寿童)	1895	1976	Music	Shakuhachi	1967
Hanzan Shimabara (島原帆山)	1901	2001	Music	Shakuhachi	1977
Gorō Yamaguchi (山口五郎)	1933	1999	Music	Shakuhachi	1992
Reibo Aoki II (青木鈴慕)	1935	2018	Music	Shakuhachi	1999
Hōzan Yamamoto (山本邦山)	1937	2014	Music	Shakuhachi	2002
Eishō Koshino (越野栄松)	1887	1965	Music	Koto	1956
Kinichi Nakanoshima (中能島欣一)	1904	1984	Music	Koto	1966
Kiyoko Miyagi (宮城喜代子)	1905	1991	Music	Koto	1983
Fumiko Yonekawa (米川文子)	1894	1995	Music	Koto	1966
Fumiko Yonekawa II (二代目米川文子) (Note: Real Name: Misao Yonekawa (Japanese: 米川操, Hepburn: Yonekawa Misao).)	1926	2024	Music	Koto	2008
Masaki Uehara (上原真佐喜)	1903	1996	Music	Koto	1970
Toshiko Yonekawa (米川敏子)	1913	2005	Music	Koto	1996
Hiroyuki Nakada (中田博之)	1912	2000	Music	Koto	1990
Shūnshō Tomizaki (富崎春昇)	1880	1958	Music	Jiuta	1955
Seikin Tomiyama (富山清翁)	1913	2008	Music	Jiuta	1969
Hatsuko Kikuhara (菊原初子)	1899	2001	Music	Jiuta	1979
Kunie Fujii (藤井久仁江)	1930	2006	Music	Jiuta	2002
Jikyō Yoshizumi (吉住慈恭)	1876	1972	Music	Nagauta (Vocals)	1956
Ijyūrō Yoshimura VII (七代目芳村伊十郎)	1901	1973	Music	Nagauta (Vocals)	1956
Rokuzaemon Kineya XIV (十四代目杵屋六左衛門)	1900	1981	Music	Nagauta (Vocals)	1974
Kosahara Hiyoshi (日吉小三八)	1907	1995	Music	Nagauta (Vocals)	1974
Satoyo Kineya (杵屋佐登代)	1911	1997	Music	Nagauta (Vocals)	1987
Shōtarō Yamada (山田抄太郎)	1899	1970	Music	Nagauta (Shamisen)	1955
Eiji Kineya (杵屋栄二)	1894	1979	Music	Nagauta (Shamisen)	1964
ChōJūrō Imabushi III (三代目今藤長十郎)	1915	1984	Music	Nagauta (Shamisen)	1984
Ayako Imabushi (今藤綾子)	1906	2003	Music	Nagauta (Shamisen)	1987
Gozaburō Kineya III (三代目杵屋五三郎)	1918	2013	Music	Nagauta (Shamisen)	1989
Sanzaemon Takara IV (四代目宝山左衛門)	1922	2010	Music	Nagauta (Narimono)	1993
Kisaku Katada III (三代目堅田喜三久)	1935	2020	Music	Nagauta (Narimono)	1999
Tosahiro Takemoto (竹本土佐広)	1897	1992	Music	Gidayūbushi (Vocals)	1982
Tomoji Tsuruzawa (鶴沢友路)	1913	2016	Music	Gidayūbushi (Shamisen)	1998
Ichihiro Miyako (二代目都一広)	1879	1970	Music	Icchūbushi (Vocals)	1956
Iki Miyako (都一いき)	1926	1997	Music	Icchūbushi (Vocals)	1996
Icchū Miyakodayū XI (十一代目都太夫一中)	1906	1991	Music	Icchūbushi (Shamisen)	1984
Setsuko Yamabiko (山彦節子)	1920	2018	Music	Katōbushi (Vocals)	1994
Senshi Miyazono IV (四代目宮薗千之)	1891	1977	Music	Miyazonobushi (Vocals)	1960
Senju Miyazono IV (四代目宮薗千寿)	1899	1985	Music	Miyazonobushi (Shamisen)	1972
Sennami Miyazono (宮薗千波)	1919	2002	Music	Miyazonobushi (Shamisen)	1998
Ichihadayū Tokiwazu (常磐津一巴太夫)	1930	2014	Music	Tokiwazubushi (Vocals)	1995
Mojiō Tokiwazu (常磐津文字翁)	1888	1960	Music	Tokiwazubushi (Shamisen)	1955
Kikusaburō Tokiwazu (常磐津菊三郎)	1897	1976	Music	Tokiwazubushi (Shamisen)	1966
Shizutayū Kiyomoto (清元志寿太夫)	1898	1999	Music	Kiyomotobushi (Vocals)	1956
Eijurō Kiyomoto (清元栄寿郎)	1904	1963	Music	Kiyomotobushi (Shamisen)	1955
Juhee Kiyomoto II (二代目清元寿兵衛)	1889	1966	Music	Kiyomotobushi (Shamisen)	1956
Eisaburō Kiyomoto (清元栄三郎)	1927	2002	Music	Kiyomotobushi (Shamisen)	1996
Eizō Kiyomoto (清元栄三)	1936	2016	Music	Kiyomotobushi (Shamisen)	2003
Masao Shimabukuro (島袋正雄)	1922	2018	Music	Ryūkyū's classical music	2000

=== Dance ===
Name	Born	Died	Category	Subcategory	Year Designated
Mitsugorō Bandō VII (坂東三津五郎（7代）)	1882	1961	Dance	Kabuki-mai	1955
Shusuke Hanayagi II (花柳寿輔（2代）)	1893	1970	Dance	Kabuki-mai	1960
Kanso Fujima II (藤間勘祖(2代))	1900	1990	Dance	Kabuki-mai	1960
Fujiko Fujima (藤間藤子)	1907	1998	Dance	Kabuki-mai	1985
Juraku Hanayagi II (花柳壽楽（2代）)	1918	2007	Dance	Kabuki-mai	2002
Toshinami Hanayagi (花柳寿南海)	1924	2018	Dance	Kabuki-mai	2004
Taka Yamamura (山村たか)	1896	1981	Dance	Kamigata-mai	1978
Yūki Yoshimura (吉村雄輝)	1923	1998	Dance	Kamigata-mai	1986
Yachiyo Inoue (井上八千代（4代）)	1905	2004	Dance	Kyo-mai	1955

=== Drama ===
Name	Born	Died	Category	Subcategory	Year Designated
Kosan Yanagiya V (柳家小さん（5代）)	1915	2002	Drama	Classical Rakugo	1995
Beichō Katsura III (桂米朝（3代）)	1925	2015	Drama	Classical Rakugo	1996
Kosanji Yanagiya X (十世柳家小三治)	1939	2021	Drama	Classical Rakugo	2014
Teisui Ichiryūsai VI (一龍斎貞水（6代）)	1939	2020	Drama	Kōdan	2002
Rokurō Kitamura (喜多村緑郎)	1871	1961	Drama	Shinpa Onnagata	1955
Shōtarō Hanayagi (花柳章太郎)	1894	1965	Drama	Shinpa Onnagata	1960

== List of designated groups (performing arts) ==
Group Name	Category	Subcategory	Year Designated
Imperial Household Agency Court Musicians (宮内庁式部職楽部, Kunaichō Shikibushoku Gakubu)	Gagaku		1955
Japan Noh Association (日本能楽会, Nihon Nōgaku-kai)	Noh		1957
Bunrakuza (人形浄瑠璃文楽座, Ningyō Jōruri Bunrakuza)	Bunraku		1955
Traditional Kabuki Preservation Society (伝統歌舞伎保存会, Dentō Kabuki Hozonkai)	Kabuki		1965
Traditional Kumi Odori Preservation Society (伝統組踊保存会, Dentō Kumi Odori Hozonkai)	Dance	Kumi Odori	1972
Ryūkyū-buyō Preservation Society (琉球舞踊保存会, Ryūkyūbuyō Hozonkai)	Dance	Ryūkyū-buyō	2009
Gidayūbushi Preservation Society (義太夫節保存会, Gidayūbushi Hozonkai)	Music	Gidayūbushi	1980
Tokiwazubushi Preservation Society (常磐津節保存会, Tokiwazubushi Hozonkai)	Music	Tokiwazubushi	1981
Icchūbushi Preservation Society (一中節保存会, Icchūbushi Hozonkai)	Music	Icchūbushi	1993
Katōbushi Preservation Society (河東節保存会, Katōbushi Hozonkai)	Music	Katōbushi	1993
Miyazonobushi Preservation Society (宮薗節保存会, Miyazonobushi Hozonkai)	Music	Miyazonobushi	1993
Ogiebushi Preservation Society (荻江節保存会, Ogiebushi Hozonkai)	Music	Ogiebushi	1993

== See also ==
- Living national treasures of Japan
- List of living national treasures of Japan (crafts)
- List of National Treasures of Japan
