= Goze =

Historic term for visually impaired Japanese women

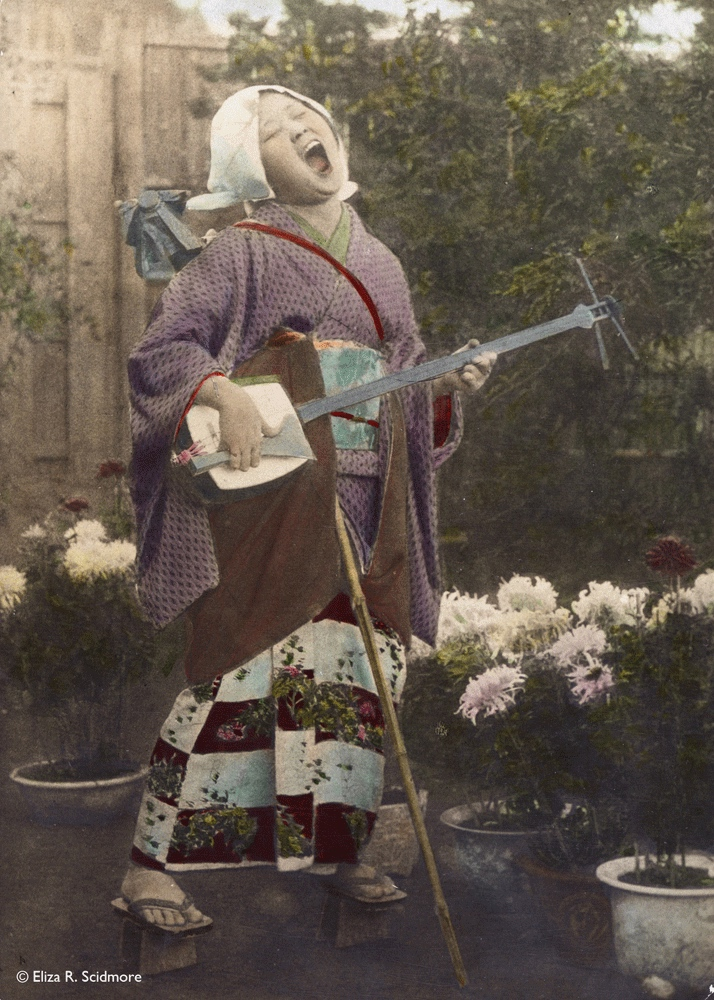
A goze in 1912 (photographed by Eliza Ruhamah Scidmore and hand-colored)

Goze (瞽女) is a Japanese historic term referring to visually impaired Japanese women, most of whom worked as musicians.

== Etymology ==
The kanji for goze (瞽女) mean "blind" and "woman". Goze is most likely derived from mekura gozen (盲御前), which also means "blind person" (gozen is a formal second-person pronoun). Although the term goze can be found in medieval records, other terms such as mōjo (盲女), jomō (女盲) were also in use (especially in written records) until the modern era. In spoken language, the term goze is usually suffixed by an honorific: goze-san, goze-sa, goze-don, etc.

== Organizations ==
From the Edo period (1600–1868), goze organized themselves in a number of ways. Some large-scale organizations could be found in urban areas, though during the nineteenth century, some documents mention goze associations in the city of Edo. In Osaka and some regional towns, goze were sometimes informally linked to pleasure quarters, where they were called to perform their songs at parties.

Goze organizations developed most in rural areas and continued to exist in Niigata (once known as Echigo) and Nagano prefectures well into the twentieth century (the last important active goze, Haru Kobayashi (小林ハル, Kobayashi Haru), died in 2005 at age 105).

From the Edo period onward, other goze groups could be found in Kyushu in the south to the Yamagata and Fukushima prefectures in the north. Blind women farther north tended to become shamans (known as itako, waka, or miko) rather than goze. Large and important groups were especially active in the Kantō and surrounding areas, in what are today Gunma, Saitama, Chiba, Shizuoka, Yamanashi, and Tokyo-to. Other groups were formed in the Nagano and Gifu prefectures, and the Aichi prefecture farther south. In addition to the well-known groups of Niigata prefecture, groups existed in other areas along the western seaboard, including Toyama, Ishikawa, and Fukui prefectures.

Suzuki Shōei divides the organizations of Echigo goze into three main types:

- Goze organizations such as the one in Takada (today the city of Jōetsu), in which a limited number of goze houses (17 in the early twentieth-century) were concentrated in the city and in which each house was led by a master teacher who passed on the rights to her position and property to her top (or favorite) student after her death. Girls who wished to become goze had to move to the city and enter the house (fictitious family) of the goze teacher. Sometimes they were adopted by the teacher as a daughter.
- Organizations such as the one centered in Nagaoka, in which goze remained in the countryside and often their own home after completing their apprenticeship with a goze elsewhere. These goze teachers were loosely linked to one another by their relation to the goze head in Nagaoka (a position assumed by a goze who, after becoming the head, assumed the name Yamamoto Goi). Once each year the goze of the Nagaoka group assembled at their headquarters, the house of Yamamoto Goi, to celebrate a ceremony known as myōonkō (妙音講) in which their history and the rules of their organization were read out loud. They deliberated on what to do about members who had broken rules, ate a celebratory meal, and performed for one another.
- Organizations such as the one found in Iida (Nagano prefecture), in which the position of head rotated among members.

== Rules ==
Goze organizations existed to allow blind women a degree of independence in pursuing their careers as musicians (or in some cases, massage). The rules that governed Echigo goze were said to have been decreed by ancient emperors, but no copy of these rules earlier than the late seventeenth century have been found. The central rules governing goze behavior was to obey teachers, be humble towards donors, and not engage in activities that might contravene the morality of the feudal society in which goze operated. Although not stipulated in detail, perhaps the most important rule was celibacy. If such an offense was detected, it easily resulted in the expulsion of a goze from the group. These stipulations were made and enforced for several reasons: if a goze did have a lover or if she married, she would have financial support from an outside source, and thus needed no further charity. Furthermore, the stipulations were developed to protect the image of the goze group as a legitimate non-profit organization and protect it from the appearing to be, or devolving into, a prostitution ring.

Rules were also necessary in part because many goze spent a good part of the year on the road, touring from village to village and depending on farmers to allow them to spend the night and use their houses as makeshift concert halls. Reputation and recognition as an officially sanctioned, upright occupation was thus of great importance in making the career of the goze possible. In addition, because Edo-period society was rife with discrimination against women, itinerants, musicians, and anyone with a visual disability, membership in an association that was recognized as legitimate and honorable was an important credential which allayed suspicions that the woman might be a wandering vagabond or prostitute.

== Songs ==
The repertory of most goze has been lost, but songs of goze from the Niigata, Nagano, Saitama, and Kagoshima prefectures have been recorded. The vast majority of these recordings are from what is today Niigata prefecture.

The repertory of Niigata (Echigo) goze can be divided into several distinct categories:

- Saimon matsusaka (祭文松坂): Long strophic songs in a 7-5 syllable meter, often based on archaic tales and sometimes with a Buddhist message. The melody to which these texts were sung was most likely a variant of the Echigo folk song Matsusaka bushi. These songs were probably created during the eighteenth century, though elements of the texts are far older. They were usually only transmitted from one goze to another.
- Kudoki (口説): Long strophic songs in a 7-7- syllable meter. Texts usually feature double love-suicides or other melodramatic themes. The melody to which these texts were sung is a variant of the Echigo folk song Shinpo kōdaiji (新保広大寺). Kudoki did not appear until the mid-nineteenth century. Although they were a highly typical goze song, they were sometimes also sung by other types of performers.
- Songs performed before doorways (門付け唄, kadozuke uta): A functional designation applying to any song used by goze as they made their way from door to door collecting donations. Goze usually sang whatever inhabitants of a given area wished to hear, but in the Niigata goze repertory, some unique songs were used exclusively for such purposes.
- Folk songs (民謡, min'yō): Rural songs, usually with no known composer, learned by the populace informally. Many types of folk songs constituted an important part of the goze repertory, and were especially useful in livening up parties when goze were summoned to perform.
- "Classical" or "semi-classical" songs: Most goze also knew songs belonging to genres such as nagauta, jōruri, hauta, or kouta. Such songs were often learned from professional musicians outside the goze community.
- Popular songs: To please their customers, goze would also sing various popular songs. Sugimoto Kikue of Takada (1898–1983), who was designated a Living National Treasure ningen kokuhō in 1971, added to her repertoire in 1922 two recently composed popular songs (both using a folk-song-style pentatonic scale), Sendō kouta and Kago no tori.

== See also ==
- Lady Saigo
- Haru Kobayashi
- Ballad of Orin (1977 film)
- Ichi (2008 film)
