= Fumiko Yonekawa =

Japanese musician (1894–1995)

Fumiko Yonekawa I 米川文子
- Birth name: Fumiko Eto (江藤文子)
- Born: June 15, 1894; Takahashi, Okayama, Japan
- Died: May 31, 1995 (aged 100); Tokyo, Japan
- Genres: Traditional Japanese music
- Occupation: Musician
- Instrument(s): Koto and shamisen

Fumiko Yonekawa I (米川文子) birth name Fumiko Eto (江藤文子) (June 15, 1894 – May 31, 1995) was a Japanese koto and shamisen musician in the Ikuta and jiuta schools.

Yonekawa was born in what is now Takahashi, Okayama on June 15, 1894.

Yonekawa started learning koto and shamisen from her father and older sister from an early age. She received strict training in koto and shamisen, as well as the Ikuta and jiuta styles of music.

Between 1914 and 1917, she moved to Tokyo and opened a koto and shamisen teaching school. In 1928, she founded the Sochokai group, and served as its president. Later, in the mid-1930s, she founded a jiuta education group and likewise served as its president. During her life, Yonekawa released numerous music recordings. Yonekawa was one of the first to modernize the musical notation of the koto.

In 1960, 1961 and 1963, Yonekawa received the Ministry of Education's Art Festival Encouragement Award. In 1964, she received the Ministry of Education's Art Festival Minister's Award. She was designated a Living National Treasure in 1966 for her high skill and contributions to the preservation and development of koto music. Yonekawa was also designated a member of the Japan Art Academy in 1978, and a Person of Cultural Merit in 1981.

Yonekawa died on May 31, 1995 at the age of 100.

Her second older brother was Kino Yonekawa (Chikatoshi Yonekawa I), a koto player, and her fourth older brother was Masao Yonekawa, a scholar of Russian literature. Her older sister was Teruju Yonekawa, a koto player. Yonekawa was also the aunt of koto performers Toshiko Yonekawa I and Chikatoshi Yonekawa II.

Yonekawa's niece, Misao Yonekawa, succeeded her in 1999 and took the name Fumiko Yonekawa, becoming the second member of the lineage to hold the name. (Note: Myouseki (Japanese: 名跡), a family or personal name that is passed down in Japanese artistic lineages.)

== See also ==
- List of Living National Treasures of Japan (performing arts)
