= Miyazono Senju IV =

Miyazono Senju (宮薗千寿; 10 September 1899 - 2 September 1985) was a Japanese jōruri singer and shamisen player, designated a Living National Treasure. He was the head of the Miyazono school of jōruri and at one time the only surviving performer in the style.

Miyazono studied the nagauta singing style from a very young age, and in 1917 began studying the Miyazono-bushi and Ogie-bushi styles under Miyazono Senju III (aka Ogie Kō). He shed his birth name, Hatsu Mizuno, taking on a number of art-names before becoming the fourth Miyazono Senju in 1959. Senju was named a Living National Treasure in 1972, and was awarded the Order of the Precious Crown the following year.

Miyazono died in 1985, though his students Miyazono Sennami, Momoyama Harue, and others, continued the tradition of Miyazono-bushi.
