= Fujima =

Fujima (written: 藤間 or 藤真) is a Japanese surname. Notable people with the surname include:

- Fujiko Fujima (藤間 藤子, 1907–1998), Japanese dancer
- Fusako Fujima (藤間房子, 1882–1954), Japanese actress
- Kaori Fujima (藤間 香織, born 1982), Japanese handball player
- Murasaki Fujima (藤間 紫, 1923–2009), Japanese dancer and actress
- Miho Fujima (藤真 美穂, born 1978), Japanese actress
