= Haru Kobayashi =

Japanese musician (1900–2005)

Haru Kobayashi 小林 ハル
- Born: 24 January 1900; Niigata Prefecture, Japan
- Died: 25 April 2005 (aged 105); Niigata Prefecture, Japan
- Occupation: Professional musician singing goze songs accompanied by shamisen
- Known for: the last Japanese blind musician and shamisen player called goze

Haru Kobayashi (小林 ハル, Kobayashi Haru; 24 January 1900 – 25 April 2005) was a Japanese goze, singing songs accompanied by shamisen. Kobayashi became blind at three months old. She started goze training at age five and started her career at age eight. She continued performing until 1978, traveling throughout most of Niigata Prefecture as well as through parts of the Yamagata and Fukushima Prefectures. In 1978, she was named one of the Living National Treasures of Japan, as a key figure of the traditional goze art form. In 1979, she was awarded the Medal of Honor with Yellow Ribbon.

== Childhood ==
Kobayashi was born on 24 January 1900, the youngest daughter of four siblings in the area currently known as Sanjo, Niigata Prefecture. She was born to a relatively wealthy farming family that possessed tenant farmers and servants. At three months of age, she lost her eyesight in both eyes due to cataracts, and her family was told that there was no hope of recovery. In 1902, her father died; at that time, her mother had asthma. Kobayashi was brought up by her great-uncle, the younger brother of her grandfather.

Her foster family feared the stigma of discrimination, so Kobayashi was confined to her bedroom. She had to eat meals there, and her food and water intake were limited to minimize her need to use the toilet, as each trip would have necessitated the assistance of family members and exposed her to passersby, as toilets were commonly in outhouses at the time. She was told not to speak unless spoken to. She was not called by her name; only "mekurakko" (blind child) or "tochi" (the short form of tochi-mekura, a slang term for a blind person). Her brother, who was sixteen years older than her, teased her and told her he could not marry because of her. She could not remember her exact date of birth. A fortune-teller foretold that she would live a long life, and her family considered how she might make a living. At that time, blind persons had limited means to earn a living. Careers open to them included acupuncture, massage, and playing music on the koto or the shamisen. Acupuncture was selected for her, but when she first met the acupuncturist, he was drunk and told her that he would perform acupuncture on her if she did not study hard, frightening her enough to abandon acupuncture.

== Training and apprenticeship ==
Subsequently, her family decided she would become a goze, and Fuji Higuchi became her tutor. At the request of her teacher, Haru's mother taught her daughter womanly disciplines very strictly, including sewing, how to dress by herself, and how to pack and carry her things on her own. If she failed, she was not allowed to eat. In March 1905, at age 5, she formally started as a goze, and her family agreed to a 21-year-long contract with Fuji for taking Haru as an apprentice. Her family paid the expenses of education and other costs in advance, and if she discontinued the apprenticeship, a breach-of-contract fee would have to be paid to Fuji. Haru was given the goze name "Sumi" and was taught at her family home, but also traveled with her teacher.

In the summer of 1907, Haru first started playing the shamisen. As she was still young, the strings made her fingers bleed. Her mother scared her by saying she would drown Haru if she said it hurt. She began to practice Kangoe, a vocal style specific to goze. This could be achieved through practice, ideally in a cold environment. Haru practiced on the banks of the Shinano River, despite her bleeding throat and thin clothes.

In the spring of 1908, she was allowed to go out on her teacher's order, who wanted her to be accustomed to walking. While walking with some of the girls she met, Haru picked flowers of various colors, while her friends picked only red flowers. When her friends said that because Haru was blind and had no concept of colors, she didn't understand what they meant. After returning home and telling her mother what happened, her mother burst into tears. Haru's mother then taught her the concept of colors, as well as telling Haru that because she was blind, she would not be able to help with the farm work or get married. Haru was also told that the only way for her to make a living was as a goze. In 1908, Fuji, Haru, and two other older apprentices went on a journey, working as goze. Haru's uncle declared that Haru should not return home if she failed; this would be a breach of contract, and money would be owed.

== Transition and proficiency ==
At age twelve, she was given a shamisen sized for adults. At age thirteen, she was allowed to play duets (nichoushamisen); this marked her becoming a "true" goze. However, Fuji did not value Haru highly and would often berate her singing skills. She claimed that, because Haru's family hunted, Haru was cursed with a poor singing voice. In 1915, her apprenticeship was discontinued without the fee, since Haru was not allowed to follow on a goze journey. Medical examinations revealed many fissures along Haru's leg bones, due to Fuji's habitual abuse. In the same year, Haru entered into an apprenticeship with Sawa Hatsuji of Nagaoka, with the approval of Goi Yamamoto, the boss of the goze organization of Nagaoka. She praised Haru's technique, and Haru was allowed to wear the undergarment with red han-eri, which was a sign of a fully-fledged goze. After she switched teachers, her condition improved along with her skills.

== Career ==
In 1921, her teacher Sawa Hatsuji died, and Haru decided to study under Tsuru Sakai. Haru, in turn, taught the lower apprentices kindheartedly. Tsuru allowed Haru to use a leather shamisen and a tortoiseshell bachi; these also symbolized the fact that she was a full-fledged goze. Tsuru retired, and Haru became the leader of her goze group.

In 1933, Haru became independent but continued to help her teacher. In 1935, Misu Tsuchida, one of Haru's apprentices, was going to marry a masseur and suggested that Haru adopt her, so they could live in one house. Haru accepted, but the masseur already had a wife. The newly constructed house that Haru had paid for was taken over by his wife. Misu's lover took the money earned by Haru. In 1934, Haru went back to Nagaoka, but there was nowhere available to live. She moved to a Tenrikyo church, where two visually impaired gozes lived. On August 1, 1945, the goze house was destroyed during an air raid. There were no fatalities because they were all away from the building. Haru returned to Nagaoka, thankful that the church had not been destroyed by the raids.

By March 1982, she was living in a special home for the blind and elderly called Tainai Yasuragino Ie. Later, she visited her birthplace and the grave of her mother, and performed an address to a kami called Matsuzaka. Although her family asked her to come back home, she refused. She even refused the idea that her bones should be buried in the family grave.

== Retirement ==
Haru was asked to educate a girl named Kimi as a goze. The girl had clear eyesight, but the requestee wanted to get rid of her, but he stuck around, abusing Haru and exploiting her for money. Eventually, after seven years of training, Haru was able to separate from the man at Takase hot spring, where he was recuperating after he collapsed. In 1960, Haru adopted the girl as her daughter.

Television was rising in popularity, and the popularity of gozes was falling. She lived as a masseuse, although she was sometimes asked to play as a goze. On May 28, 1973, Haru declared her retirement as a goze and gave her shamisen to an acquaintance. She visited a temple every day, but television reporters were always waiting there for her.

== Revival ==
Even after Haru retired as a goze, she attracted the attention of the public when she performed before the scholars of folk arts at Kokugakuin University. The education committee of Shibata city decided to record the goze performances, and she began to perform again. In July 1977, she went into the Tainai Yasuragino Ie, a special home for the aged, and was united with former gozes. By the 1980s, previous gozes who had worked in the region lived in the same home for the aged. The project of the education committee continued between 1973 and 1975, recording 40 tapes of 120 minutes each. Parts of them were broadcast through NHK. Reiko Takeshita (竹下玲子) was accepted as a new goze student, and Naoko Kayamori (萱森直子) became Haru's last student. On 25 March 1977, Haru was credited as a preserver of goze activities, and on 29 April 1979, she was given the Medal of Honour with Yellow Ribbon.

== Age 100 ==
In 2000, Haru was 100 years old, and she was awarded a special award by Sanjo city. In 2001, she was made a special citizen of Sanjo city. In 2002, she was awarded the 36th Eiji Yoshikawa award. On 25 April 2005, she died of old age.

== Performances and technique ==
Reiko Takeshita, her student, commented that her singing was like that of Bel canto. According to her, when three experienced singers sang at the same time, Haru's voice was the loudest.

Haru's tone was constant, and there was no rising or falling. Masako Shirasu commented that Haru's voice was more or less monotonous. Takeshita once asked Haru whether emotion should affect singing, and she answered no.

Naoko Kayamori, another student, wrote that Haru could sing three different ways, likely because of her three different teachers. According to Haru, she had difficulties adapting to new circumstances.

Haru had a brilliant memory, possibly because she could not see. Jun-ichi Sakuma wrote that the education committee of Shibata city was surprised that Haru remembered several hundred goze songs, and she memorized every song when she heard it only once. Gerald Groemer, a scholar of music, compared her performances Awatokushimajuurobee and Kuzunoha no Kowakare(阿波徳島十郎兵衛 and 葛の葉子別れ) played 20 years apart, and found practically no difference between them. Haru said that she never once thought of singing as enjoyable, and she has no favorite songs. She simply sang because it was her job. In the house of the aged, Haru belonged to a music club, but commented that folk songs and popular songs were difficult.

== Personality ==
Haru's mother told her that she should answer "yes" to any request and never express her opinions since Haru could not see and had to be cared for throughout her life. She was told that she should not bother anyone and do everything by herself, and she should not do anything that would cause others to dislike her. Shomoju pointed out that these rules of Haru's mother governed her behavior throughout her life. She was never bitter and had accepted her lot in life. But at the same time, her complacency made her life full of difficulties. Haru accepted anything that happened to her saying, "If you walk with good people, it's a festival; if you walk with bad people, it's harsh training." Sakuma wrote that Haru was a rare, good-natured person, while other gozes thought that Haru was an exceptionally unlucky person. Haru had a number of unfortunate events occur throughout her life, but her character remained solid. Being a goze did not change her, and she was able to live as normally as a sighted person. Haru expressed that she might have fostered her good nature and sincerity on her own, but her mother was pivotal in the person she became.

Shimoju commented on Haru's behaviour at the Yasuragi no Ie (home for the aged). Tomoko Matsui, a cameraman who took pictures of Haru, said that Haru never expressed anything that would make others look upon her with scrutiny.

Painter Susumu Kinoshita drew pictures of Haru for 20 years, starting in 1982. According to Kinoshita, her face was different every time he drew a picture of her. Shimoju wrote that Haru was usually very dignified, but looked weary while alone.

== Philosophy ==
On her personal philosophy, Haru said

No matter where you go or how old you are, you are faced with various hardships, but no matter how trying it is, the kami or the Buddha will see what is in your heart. Even if others don't understand that and say and do as they please, I will never say or do anything excessive and will leave everything in the hands of the kami and the Buddha.

As long as they don't call me a thief, I don't care what others say about me. The kami and the Buddha are watching and know what is true. So, even though I have a lot I would like to say to them, if I say it or talk back to them, I would be just as guilty as they are.

Kusumi Kawano wrote that

Haru lived by the conception that a good thing causes a good result, and a bad thing brings a bad result.

Haru said that her blindness was the result of her bad deed in her previous life; I want to have eyesight, even if I become a worm. I have lived with this in mind.

A monk who gave Haru a Dharma name said that

Haru believed in the saying Every insect has a soul. by Gautama Buddha Haru rejected the concept of desire, and believed in enlightenment through abstinence from worldly desires—that is, she believed those who follow this path become enlightened.
