= Momoyama =

Momoyama may refer to:

== History ==
- Azuchi–Momoyama period, the final phase of the Sengoku period in Japanese history 1568–1600

== People ==
- Harue Momoyama (桃山 晴衣; 1939–2008), Japanese singer-songwriter
- Ion Momoyama, Japanese singer and voice actor
- Momoyama Kenichi (1909–1991), Korean prince and cavalry officer in the Japanese Imperial Army

== Places ==
- Momoyama Castle, a castle in Fushimi Ward, Kyoto, Japan
- Momoyama Gakuin University, an Anglican university in Osaka, Japan
- Momoyama Station, railway station in Fushimi-ku, Kyoto, Kyoto Prefecture, Japan
- Momoyama, Wakayama, a town in Naga District, Nakayama Prefecture, Japan
- Momoyama-minamiguchi Station, a train station located in Fushimi-ku
