= Shimabukuro =

Shimabukuro (written: 島袋, Okinawan: Shimabuku) is an Ryukyuan surname. Notable people with the surname include:

- Hiroko Shimabukuro (b. 1984), Japanese singer
- Jake Shimabukuro (b. 1976), American ukulele virtuoso
- Kazuyoshi Shimabuku (b. 1999), Peruvian footballer
- Maile Shimabukuro (b. 1970), member of the Hawaii House of Representatives
- Masayuki Shimabukuro (1948–2012), 21st-generation master (hanshi) of the Masaoka line of Musō Jikiden Eishin-ryū Iaido
- Mitsufumi Shimabukuro (1920–2006), Japanese drummer and Living National Treasure
- Mitsutoshi Shimabukuro (b. 1975), Japanese manga artist
- Roberto Salazar Shimabukuro (b. 1973), Peruvian footballer
- Sam Koyei Shimabukuro (b. 1925), president (1985–88) of the Tokyo Japan Temple of The Church of Jesus Christ of Latter-day Saints
- Shimabuku Tatsuo (1908–1975), Japanese martial artist
- Satsuki Shimabukuro (b. 1988), known professionally as Meisa Kuroki, Japanese actress, model, and singer
- Seina Shimabukuro (b. 1987), Japanese model and cast member of Terrace House
- Sho Shimabukuro (b. 1997), Japanese tennis player
- Zenryō Shimabukuro (1908–1969), Japanese founder of Shorin-ryu Seibukan karate

== Fictional characters ==
- Rikiya Shimabukuro, a supporting character in the video game Yakuza 3
