= Tenshi to Akuto!! =

Japanese manga series

- First tankōbon volume cover

天使とアクト!!
- Genre: Comedy
- Manga
- Written by: Aya Hirakawa
- Published by: Shogakukan
- Imprint: Shōnen Sunday Comics
- Magazine: Weekly Shōnen Sunday
- Original run: December 24, 2014 – May 30, 2018
- Volumes: 17
- icon

Tenshi to Akuto!! (天使とアクト!!; lit. 'Angel and Akuto!!') is a Japanese manga series written and illustrated by Aya Hirakawa. It was serialized in Shogakukan's Weekly Shōnen Sunday from December 2014 to May 2018.

== Plot ==
Akuto Ikurumi is the top of his class in every subject, including sports, and he knows it. The son of a well-known politician, a degree of arrogance is to be expected. But Akuto takes it to a new extreme with his condescending and self-important attitude. The friends he may have had in his elementary years have long since left his side, and it doesn't help matters that his effeminate voice makes him a target of constant ridicule by his "lower class" schoolmates. Then, Nari Harusaka enters his life, and Akuto's controlling personality is thrown off kilter by the optimistic but manipulating young seiyū. With his life on the line, he agrees to be a voice in her Anime Research Society's project for the upcoming cultural festival as the female lead.

== Characters ==
Akuto Ikurumi (凰生為人, Ikurumi Akuto)
A second year high school student who is perfect both academically and physically. Because of this and his father being a well-known and rich politician, he is arrogant and has a cold attitude.
Nari Harusaka (春坂なり, Harusaka Nari)
An optimistic middle school student who works as a voice actress. She is considered a child prodigy in voice acting.

== Publication ==
Written and illustrated by Aya Hirakawa, Tenshi to Akuto!! was serialized in Shogakukan's shōnen manga magazine Weekly Shōnen Sunday from December 24, 2014, to May 30, 2018. Shogakukan collected its chapters in 17 tankōbon volumes, released from April 17, 2015, to August 17, 2018.

=== Volumes ===
No.	Release date	ISBN
1	April 17, 2015	978-4-09-125818-2
2	July 17, 2015	978-4-09-126024-6
3	September 18, 2015	978-4-09-126228-8
4	November 18, 2015	978-4-09-126481-7
5	February 18, 2016	978-4-09-126815-0
6	May 18, 2016	978-4-09-127140-2
7	August 18, 2016	978-4-09-127328-4
8	November 18, 2016	978-4-09-127417-5
9	January 18, 2017	978-4-09-127483-0
10	May 18, 2017	978-4-09-127572-1
11	August 18, 2017	978-4-09-127680-3
12	October 18, 2017	978-4-09-127855-5
13	January 18, 2018	978-4-09-128078-7
14	March 16, 2018	978-4-09-128209-5
15	May 18, 2018	978-4-09-128252-1
16	July 18, 2018	978-4-09-128338-2
17	August 17, 2018	978-4-09-128388-7

== Reception ==
Tenshi to Akuto!! ranked first on AnimeAnime.jp's sixth "Most Wanted Anime Adaptation" poll in 2023.

== See also ==
- Kunisaki Izumo no Jijō, another manga series by the same author
- Dealing with Mikadono Sisters Is a Breeze, another manga series by the same author
