= Tomimoto-bushi =

Japanese style of music

Tomimoto-bushi (富本節) is a style of Japanese jōruri music – narrative singing with shamisen accompaniment. Noted for its subtlety and refinement, it was widely popular in the late 18th century, but today has been largely eclipsed by the Kiyomoto-bushi style, which arose from it.

== History ==
Tomimoto-bushi was one of several styles that arose among the students of a singer named Miyakoji Bungo-no-jō (Note: Miyakoji Bungo-no-jō (Japanese: 宮古路豊後掾)) (c. 1660–1740) who had trained in Kyoto and became a sensation in Edo (modern Tokyo) when he appeared on the kabuki stage. It was founded by Tomimoto Buzen I (1716–1764), and achieved its peak of popularity during the long career of his son, Tomimoto Buzen II (1754–1822). Compared to other styles, Tomimoto-bushi was considered more refined and subtle, and was admired for its intricate shamisen accompaniment. Another widely admired performer during the late 18th century was the geisha Tomimoto Toyohina, who appears in numerous ukiyo-e prints by such artists as Utamaro.

The style was popular among upper-class samurai and the wealthy merchants who frequented the Yoshiwara pleasure quarter; at the peak of its popularity, proficiency in the Tomimoto style was said to be a prerequisite for young women wishing to enter service in the inner precincts of Edo Castle, residence of the shōgun.

Today the Tomimoto style has been eclipsed by the Kiyomoto style, which arose from it in the early 19th century. It is rarely performed publicly, although it is passed down privately among performers of other schools, and some Tomimoto compositions have entered the Kiyomoto repertoire.
