= Meriyasu =

Japanese style of music

Meriyasu is a type of music used in kabuki theatre performances in Japan.

Originally derived from the Portuguese word meias, meaning a stretchy material (and still used today to refer to knitted garments), meriyasu came to denote a form of theatrical music which expanded and contracted in order to fit the events unfolding on stage. Played on the shamisen, meriyasu interludes are generally called for to accompany sections of dialogue. As a result, they are usually instrumental solos, rather than songs. Despite this, the genre is still classified as a subset of nagauta ("long song") music.
