= Mitsufumi Shimabukuro =

Japanese drummer

Mitsufumi Shimabukuro (島袋 光史, Shimabukuro Mitsufumi; 1920–2006) was a Japanese drummer in the Kumi odori tradition. In 2003 he was recognised as a Living National Treasure, holder of an Important Intangible Cultural Heritage. Shimabukuro was the first kumiodori performer to be accorded this accolade.
