= Momoyama Harue =

Japanese singer-songwriter (1939–2008)

- 桃山 晴衣
- Born: June 22, 1939; Tokyo, Tokyo Prefecture, Japan
- Died: December 5, 2008 (aged 69); Nisshin, Aichi Prefecture, Japan
- Occupation: Musician

Momoyama Harue (桃山 晴衣; 1939–2008) was a Japanese singer-songwriter who specialized in the shamisen. Her real name was Kashima Harue (鹿島 晴江).

== Biography ==
Momoyama began learning to play the shamisen at the age of six. In 1961, with the support of her father, Kashima Daiji (鹿島大治), a researcher of ryūkōka and historical Japanese music, she established the Momoyama school (桃山流, Momoyama-ryū) of shamisen-playing and became an iemoto.

Two years later, in 1963, Momoyama was introduced to the Miyazono-bushi (宮薗節) style of jōruri and came to be one of the few students of its then-final master Miyazono Senju IV. In 1974, she retired as iemoto of the Momoyama school and became the last disciple of Tomomichi Soeda, an authority on the enka of the Meiji and Taishō eras.

In 1981, Momoyama began a project attempting to resurrect the Ryōjin Hishō, a collection of songs from the Heian period. This came to occupy the greater part of the remainder of her life. While touring in Europe, she met the percussionist Tsuchitori Toshiyuki. The two would go on to found the record label Ryūkō Gakusha (立光学舍) in 1987. Later, the two collaborated with other artists, including Ōno Kazuo.

She died of breast cancer at a hospital on December 5, 2008, in Nisshin, Aichi. She was 69 years old. After her death, Tsuchitori continued to publicize her music.
