= Kunisaki Izumo no Jijō =

Japanese manga series

- First tankōbon volume cover, featuring Izumo Kunisaki

國崎出雲の事情 (Kunisaki Izumo no Jijou)
- Genre: Comedy
- Manga
- Written by: Aya Hirakawa
- Published by: Shogakukan
- Imprint: Shōnen Sunday Comics
- Magazine: Weekly Shōnen Sunday
- Original run: January 13, 2010 – March 26, 2014
- Volumes: 19
- icon

Kunisaki Izumo no Jijō (國崎出雲の事情; lit. 'Izumo Kunisaki's Circumstances') is a Japanese manga series written and illustrated by Aya Hirakawa. It was serialized in Shogakukan's Weekly Shōnen Sunday magazine from January 2010 to March 2014, with its chapters collected in 19 tankōbon volumes. Two drama CDs were released in 2011 and 2012, respectively.

== Story ==
Izumo Kunisaki, a boy often mistaken as a girl, is an onnagata (female role) actor in the Japanese traditional stage play kabuki. The series follows Izumo's school and actor life. Izumo performs some of the most famous roles in kabuki, solving problems and gaining friends along the way.

== Characters ==
=== Main characters ===
Izumo Kunisaki (國崎 出雲, Kunisaki Izumo)
Voiced by: Miyuki Sawashiro
Onnagata (女形; "female role") kabuki actor and first year student of the entertainment division in Shijogawara High School. Born to a kabuki-performing family Kunisaki, he began his acting career in his childhood, but had not performed for eight years due to his parents' separation and his own antipathy for playing female roles. With his feminine looks, he is a natural as a female impersonator, and attracts both male and female characters in and out of the stage. He dislikes cross-dressing, but is often forced to wear female clothing. He works part-time as a maid in a maid cafe. In school he proves to have good sense in sports. He is also an excellent cook.
Kagato Sumeragi (皇 加賀斗, Sumeragi Kagato)
Voiced by: Mitsuki Saiga
An onnagata actor in Kunisaki-ya. As a senior apprentice, Kagato teaches Izumo female role performance. He is a talented actor with beautiful features and delicate health. He falls ill before his stage performance, forcing Izumo to fill in and re-start his onnagata career. He often cross-dresses under the pretext of the "study of onnagata", but Izumo suspects he only likes it. He is enthusiastic about teaching Izumo the art of the onnagata, but sometimes his enthusiasm is a little too overwhelming...
Sae Togashiki (栂敷 紗英, Togashiki Sae)
Voiced by: Daisuke Kishio
Son of a distinguished kabuki family Togashiki-ya, and a tachiyaku (立役; "male role") actor. Second year student of the entertainment division in Shijogawara High School. He comes to believe Izumo is a girl after performing with him in the play Narukami, as he touches Izumo's breasts and find it soft (actually it was a donut). He has a crush on Izumo ever since. He's very flamboyant and likes to show off that he is handsome. He often tries to protect Izumo but also holds himself back so that Izumo can grow for the sake of Kabuki.
Kuroe Minamoto (源 玄衛, Minamoto Kuroe)
Voiced by: Aoi Yūki
Son of kabuki family Minamoto-ya, and a tachiyaku actor. First year student of the entertainment division in Shijogawara High School. Having childish features, he had played only child roles until the age of 15, as he was afraid the audience will not accept him as an adult. Izumo encourages him to play his first adult role in the play Kamakura Sandai Ki. He's clingy to Izumo. Many scenes show that he has a much darker, imp-like personality underneath his cute exterior.
Umeki Sugawara (菅原 梅樹, Sugawara Umeki)
Voiced by: Kishō Taniyama
First son of kabuki family Sugawara-ya, one of the most prominent families in the kabuki world. Tachiyaku actor, and second year student of the entertainment division in Shijogawara High School. As the heir of his family, he was promised good roles but was eventually spoiled by it, having rough manners and not showing up for practice. He actually acted this way because he wanted Matsuki to become the head of house, not himself. He has also taken a liking to Izumo and calls him pipsqueak and tends to fight with Matsuki over Izumo.
Matsuki Sugawara (菅原 松樹, Sugawara Matsuki)
Voiced by: Hikaru Midorikawa
Second son of kabuki family Sugawara-ya, tachiyaku actor, and first year student of the normal division in Shijogawara High School. He is also a regular customer of the maid cafe where Izumo works part-time. Matsuki hated his older brother Umeki, for his rough behavior and loss of respect for Kabuki. Dispute between the brothers came to a solution after Izumo served to bridge them in the play Kagotsurube. The first time he met Izumo was when Izumo was working in a maid cafe. He developed some feelings for the 'female' Izumo but immediately squashed them when he realized that Izumo was male. Despite that, he still calls Izumo 'Maid', much to the other's chagrin and fights with Umeki over Izumo.

=== Kunisaki family ===
Yakumo Kunisaki (國崎 八雲, Kunisaki Yakumo)
Izumo's father and the present head of Kunisaki-ya. He loves his son, apparently too much, getting sexually aroused by Izumo dressed in female costumes. Because of his obsession with his son, his wife left him and took Izumo with her.
Rui Shiga (志賀 累, Shiga Rui)
Izumo's apprentice. He declared love to Izumo while dressed in girl's clothing, and demanded to enter Kunisaki-ya as a onnagata to be. A third year junior high school student, he wishes to become a Kabuki actor after being enthralled by Izumo's stage performance during a school trip to the theater.

=== Kabuki actors ===
Tojiro Izaya (伊左屋 藤次郎, Izaya Tōjirō)
Voiced by: Mitsuaki Madono
An actor from the Kansai region, who claims himself to be the top young actor of Kansai-style kabuki, or Kamigata-Kabuki. He seems to be arrogant and proud, but is actually very serious about acting and therefore, sensitive. He suffers from a slump due to poor relationship with other actors while practicing for the kabuki play Sonezaki Shinju, but eventually managed to overcome that with the help of Izumo and Umeki.
Kiyora Azami (薊 清良, Azami Kiyora)
Leader of a new kabuki troupe Zan-Kabuki (斬歌舞伎, Zan Kabuki). He bears a grudge against traditional kabuki, and goes hard on traditional actors like Izumo. He once belonged to a traditional kabuki family, but was banned from it because his teacher decided his performance did not follow traditions. Recovers relationship with his former teacher through the play Yamatotakeru.
Iori Sakura (佐倉 伊織, Sakura Iori)
A son of a traditional kabuki family, he was tortured in Kiyora's Zan-kabuki troupe. He is an extremely optimistic person, and does not think he was being ill-treated at all.
Anjuro Yukishima (幸嶋 庵寿郎, Yukishima Anjuro)
Veteran kabuki onnagata actor. A 90-year-old living national treasure with extreme beauty on stage.

=== Other characters ===
Yuzuha Nakamura (仲村 柚葉, Nakamura Yuzuha)
Voiced by: Eri Kitamura
A childhood friend of Izumo, and daughter of kabuki family Nakamura-ya. She is not a kabuki actress, as kabuki is only performed by men, but knows a lot about kabuki and the Rien. She is a first year student in the entertainment division just like Izumo, and is hinted to be a TV talent of some sort.
Satsuki Kumedera (粂寺 皐, Kumedera Satsuki)
Voiced by: Yū Kobayashi
Student guidance teacher of Shijogawara High School. She strictly keeps an eye on her students, but she does not hide her sexual arousal for Izumo. A kabuki fan in her childhood, she was hurt by the haughty behavior of an actor she liked, causing her to abandon her love for kabuki until she was ordered to check Izumo's performance in the play Sannin Kichiza.
Shuichiro Kagami (各務 秀一郎, Kagami Shūichirō)
A rich kid suffering from a lack of attention from his father, who is an important patron of Kunisaki-ya. After watching Izumo's kabuki stage performance in Yotsuya Kaidan, the father and son began to take time together.
Roku Suzutake (篠竹 禄, Suzutake Roku)
A Kabuki actor who came back from overseas performance. Izumo challenged Roku because of his bad attitude towards others such as blackmailing and threatening other people.
Jin Kiriya (桐矢 臣, Kiriya Jin)
A movie star with a strong obsession for beauty. He is interested in Izumo's beauty, and plans to make Izumo quit Kabuki in order to keep him by himself.
Kaname Yanagi (矢薙 要, Yanagi Kaname)
A male idol belonging to a major idol production. He persists on being a perfect idol, and very sensitive about making a scandal.
Kikuo Shiraki (白木 菊雄, Kikuo Shiraki)
A leader of the student council room group, Kikuo returns to school from a year's suspension. He wears chains all around him, and is feared for his violent attitude. He meets Izumo on the way to his first day back in school, and later revealed, a Kabuki actor.

== Production ==
Aya Hirakawa published a prototype one-shot of the series in Weekly Shōnen Sunday in 2009. It was a battle story, in which the hero Izumo transforms into a battle form of Izumo no Okuni, a miko who is believed to have invented the theatrical art form of kabuki. This prototype was republished in Shōnen Sunday Super on January 25, 2011. Kunisaki Izumo no Jijō is labeled as an otokonoko (男の娘) series in the obi strip and media sources introducing the manga. On the other hand, this series highlights the Japanese traditional performing art kabuki, which is rather rare to be a manga theme. Hirakawa stated that kabuki is a theme she always wanted to write about. She was born and raised in Shimane Prefecture, believed to be the birthplace of Izumo no Okuni. She became interested in kabuki when she participated in a play about Izumo no Okuni when she was in junior high school. The series was put on hiatus in November 2011, due to Hirakawa's health issues, and resumed in February 2012.

== Media ==
=== Manga ===
Written and illustrated by Aya Hirakawa, Kunisaki Izumo no Jijō was first published as a prototype one-shot in Shogakukan's Weekly Shōnen Sunday in 2009 (republished in Shōnen Sunday Super on January 25, 2011). The manga was serialized in Weekly Shōnen Sunday from January 13, 2010, to March 26, 2014. Shogakukan collected its chapters in 19 tankōbon volumes, released from April 16, 2010, to May 16, 2014.

==== Volumes ====
| No. | Release date | ISBN |
|---|---|---|
| 01 | April 16, 2010 | 978-4-09-122270-1 |
| 02 | July 16, 2010 | 978-4-09-122476-7 |
| 03 | October 18, 2010 | 978-4-09-122627-3 |
| 04 | January 18, 2011 | 978-4-09-122768-3 |
| 05 | April 18, 2011 | 978-4-09-122852-9 |
| 06 | July 15, 2011 | 978-4-09-123179-6 |
| 07 | October 18, 2011; October 14, 2011 (LE) | 978-4-09-123333-2; 978-4-09-941725-3 (LE) |
| 08 | January 18, 2012 | 978-4-09-123520-6 |
| 09 | April 18, 2012 | 978-4-09-123647-0 |
| 10 | July 18, 2012 | 978-4-09-123789-7 |
| 11 | October 18, 2012; October 16, 2012 (LE) | 978-4-09-124014-9; 978-4-09-941804-5 (LE) |
| 12 | January 18, 2013 | 978-4-09-124168-9 |
| 13 | March 18, 2013 | 978-4-09-124239-6 |
| 14 | June 18, 2014 | 978-4-09-124314-0 |
| 15 | September 18, 2013 | 978-4-09-124376-8 |
| 16 | December 18, 2013 | 978-4-09-124376-8 |
| 17 | March 18, 2014 | 978-4-09-124576-2 |
| 18 | April 18, 2014 | 978-4-09-124618-9 |
| 19 | May 16, 2014 | 978-4-09-124650-9 |

=== Drama CD ===
A drama CD was released as a bundle for the limited edition of Volume 7 of the manga on October 14, 2011. Another CD was bundled with Volume 11 on October 16, 2012.

== See also ==
- Tenshi to Akuto!!, another manga series by the same author
- Dealing with Mikadono Sisters Is a Breeze, another manga series by the same author
