= Japan Kōgei Association =

Japanese cultural heritage organization

The Japan Kōgei Association (日本工芸会) is a non-profit association dedicated to the protection and development of intangible cultural heritage, traditional Japanese crafts and supporting artisans such as Living National Treasures.

The organisation has nine branches across Japan. Each branch has its own study groups and provides training sessions. It holds a group exhibition annually. It had around 1,300 members as of 2016. The organisation works to develop and improve traditional craft and skill techniques. It works with the government of Japan.

Traditional crafts are divided into seven groups:

- Japanese ceramics
- Japanese textiles
- Japanese lacquerware
- Japanese metalwork
- Japanese woodworking and Japanese bambooworking
- Japanese dolls
- other crafts such as washi
