= Dealing with Mikadono Sisters Is a Breeze =

Japanese manga series

- First tankōbon volume cover, featuring the Mikadono sisters: Miwa (left), Niko (center), and Kazuki (right)

帝乃三姉妹は案外、チョロい。 (Mikadono Sanshimai wa Angai, Choroi)
- Genre: Harem; Romantic comedy
- Manga
- Written by: Aya Hirakawa
- Published by: Shogakukan
- English publisher: NA: Orange Inc. (digital); Viz Media
- Imprint: Shōnen Sunday Comics
- Magazine: Weekly Shōnen Sunday
- Original run: December 22, 2021 – present
- Volumes: 20
- Anime television series
- Directed by: Tadahito Matsubayashi
- Written by: Takayo Ikami
- Music by: Masaru Yokoyama
- Studio: P.A. Works
- Licensed by: Crunchyroll
- Original network: Tokyo MX, GYT, GTV, BS11, MBS, TSK, AT-X
- Original run: July 10, 2025 – September 25, 2025
- Episodes: 12
- icon

Dealing with Mikadono Sisters Is a Breeze (Japanese: 帝乃三姉妹は案外、チョロい。, Hepburn: Mikadono Sanshimai wa Angai, Choroi; lit. 'The Three Mikadono Sisters Are Surprisingly Easy to Handle') is a Japanese manga series written and illustrated by Aya Hirakawa. It has been serialized in Shogakukan's shōnen manga magazine Weekly Shōnen Sunday since December 2021. It follows a young high schooler invited to stay with his mother's friend, only to find out that he is living with three prodigy sisters.

An anime television series adaptation produced by P.A. Works aired from July to September 2025.

== Plot ==
Yuu Ayase is a high school student who struggles to live up to the legacy of his late mother, an actress. Some time after his mother's death, Yuu is taken in by the wealthy Mikadono family and starts living with three talented sisters: the rookie actress Kazuki, the rising martial artist Niko, and the shogi prodigy Miwa. The three sisters are known in Yuu's new school as the "Three Royals". As the four spend time together as a family, the sisters warm up to Yuu and develop romantic feelings for him.

== Characters ==
Yuu Ayase (綾世 優, Ayase Yū)
Voiced by: Minami Hinata (Japanese); Kieran Regan, Monica Flatley (young) (English)
A second-year high school student at Saika Academy. He grew up in a single-parent household and never knew his father. After the death of his mother, the famous actress Subaru Ayase, he was taken under the care of her close friends, the Mikadono family. Unlike his mother, he is talentless, unskilled, and ordinary, with the only thing inherited from her being his good looks. However, he is very mentally strong against those who expect more of him because of his family background. He is good at housework, mainly cleaning and cooking. In terms of love, he is very prudish and does not understand it.
Kazuki Mikadono (帝乃 一輝, Mikadono Kazuki)
Voiced by: Yurina Amami (Japanese); Emi Lo (English)
The boyish-looking oldest daughter of the Mikadono family. She attends Saika Academy with her other two sisters, with each sister excelling in their respective department. She is an up-and-coming actress prodigy who is a performing arts student and the star of a popular musical ensemble. She is gifted in her art with an overwhelmingly flamboyant personality and an enormous amount of pride.
Niko Mikadono (帝乃 二琥, Mikadono Niko)
Voiced by: Aoi Koga (Japanese); Madeleine Morris (English)
The middle daughter of the family, who is the top of the academy's athletic department and also the captain of karate club. She has won multiple championships in various karate competitions. She composes herself strictly and is serious about herself. She is interested in cute clothes and accessories, but avoids them because she thinks they do not suit her. However, Yuu helps her accept this part of herself and she slowly begins to embrace it.
Miwa Mikadono (帝乃 三和, Mikadono Miwa)
Voiced by: Yoshino Aoyama (Japanese); Lindsay Seidel (English)
The youngest daughter, who is the top of the academy's academics department. She is a talented professional player who has won numerous shogi, Go, and chess tournaments, as well as an international math contest. She is a genius in literature who excels in all aspects of her studies and boasts an IQ of over 180. She is also a bit mean-spirited.
Mikadono's father (帝乃父, Mikadono chichi)
Voiced by: Masaya Matsukaze (Japanese); David Matranga (English)
The father of the Mikadono sisters. He is a man of extreme discipline, fiercely convinced that talent is paramount and mediocrity has no worth. Though he took Yuu in for Subaru's sake, it was never out of kindness—rather, he hoped Yuu would grow to match the brilliance of his mother.
Subaru Ayase (綾世昴, Ayase Subaru)
Voiced by: Ai Kayano (Japanese); Morgan Lauré (English)
Yuu's late mother, who entrusted him to the care of the Mikadono family before her death, hoping he would find happiness and a loving home with them. She was a renowned actress.
Sakura Yaotome (矢乙女桜, Yaotome Sakura)
Voiced by: Fūka Izumi (Japanese); Reshel Mae (English)
A shogi player and first-year high school girl. She is a self-professed rival of Miwa, who later becomes good friends with her and Yuu. Rather than a genius, she is considered an ordinary, clumsy girl, but hardworking. She is rather similar to Yuu, something that the sisters note.

== Media ==
=== Manga ===
Written and illustrated by Aya Hirakawa, Dealing with Mikadono Sisters Is a Breeze started in Shogakukan's shōnen manga magazine Weekly Shōnen Sunday on December 22, 2021. Shogakukan has collected its chapters into individual tankōbon volumes. The first volume was released on March 17, 2022. As of September 16, 2026, 20 volumes have been released.

In June 2025, AI localization company Orange Inc. started publishing the series digitally in English, with its first two volumes available on its e-bookstore service Emaqi. In July 2025, Viz Media started publishing the series digitally.

==== Volumes ====
No.	Japanese release date	Japanese ISBN
1	March 17, 2022	978-4-09-851038-2
2	July 15, 2022	978-4-09-851152-5
3	October 18, 2022	978-4-09-851347-5
4	December 16, 2022	978-4-09-851490-8
5	March 16, 2023	978-4-09-851774-9
6	July 18, 2023	978-4-09-852126-5
7	October 18, 2023	978-4-09-852856-1
8	January 18, 2024	978-4-09-853076-2
9	April 17, 2024	978-4-09-853222-3
10	July 18, 2024	978-4-09-853436-4
11	October 18, 2024	978-4-09-853638-2
12	December 18, 2024	978-4-09-853810-2
13	March 18, 2025	978-4-09-854022-8
14	June 18, 2025	978-4-09-854153-9
15	July 4, 2025	978-4-09-854173-7
16	September 18, 2025	978-4-09-854236-9
17	December 18, 2025	978-4-09-854375-5
18	March 18, 2026	978-4-09-854487-5
19	June 18, 2026	978-4-09-854651-0
20	September 16, 2026	978-4-09-854814-9
21	December 17, 2026	978-4-09-855026-5

=== Anime ===
In July 2024, it was announced that the manga would receive an anime television series adaptation produced by Aniplex, animated by P.A. Works and directed by Tadahito Matsubayashi, with series composition by Takayo Ikami, character designs by Yūsuke Inoue, and music composed by Masaru Yokoyama. It was broadcast from July 10 to September 25, 2025, on Tokyo MX and other networks. (Note: Tokyo MX and BS11 lists the series premiere on July 9, 2025, at 24:30, which is effectively July 10 at 12:30 a.m. JST.) The opening theme song is "Kimi ni Fusawashii Kiseki" (君にふさわしい奇跡; 'A Miracle Fitting for You'), performed by Nichimezo, and the ending theme songs are performed by Yurina Amami, Aoi Koga and Yoshino Aoyama as their respective characters.

Crunchyroll is streaming the series; an English dub premiered on July 30, 2025.

==== Episodes ====
Home	Title	Directed by	Written by	Storyboarded by	Ending theme song (Note: Ending theme song information is taken from the ending credits of each episode.)	Original release date
1	"Prodigy and Mediocrity"; Transliteration: "Tensai to, Heibon" (Japanese: 天才と、凡人。)	Ōta Tomoaki	Takayo Ikami	Tadahito Matsubayashi	"Kimi ni Fusawashii Kiseki" (君にふさわしい奇跡) by Nichimezo	July 10, 2025
Yu enrolls at Saika Academy for Gifted Students, drawing attention as the son of the late legendary actress Subaru Ayase. However, he is ungifted, performing below average in all areas, and has grown accustomed to others' disappointment. He faces ridicule from the academy's top students—the Mikadono sisters: Kazuki, a renowned actress; Niko, a star athlete; and Miwa, a prodigious scholar. Regretful of his past estrangement from his mother due to feelings of inadequacy, Yu only reconciled with her shortly before her death. After moving in with his mother's old friend, he discovers the man's daughters are the same sisters who disdain his presence. Noticing their disorganized lifestyle, Yu takes over household chores, demonstrating unexpected skill. He observes that the sisters remain wholly absorbed in their pursuits, mirroring the emotional distance he once had with his mother. Though they outwardly dismiss his daily well-wishes, each secretly appreciates them. When their father delays his return, he entrusts Yu with their care, insisting that even prodigies may someday need his support.
2	"Her Secret"; Transliteration: "Kanojo no, Himitsu." (Japanese: 彼女の、秘密。)	Kenya Ueno	Takayo Ikami	Tadahito Matsubayashi	"Aimai Graffiti" (曖昧グラフィティ) by Yurina Amami	July 17, 2025 (Note: From Episode 2, episodes are released on Prime Video, dAnime Store and Crunchyroll a week before their televised airings.)
Mr. Mikadono explains that Kazuki has an upcoming audition, Niko is training for a karate championship, and Miwa is competing in a shogi tournament. Wanting to foster family bonding, Yu begins preparing tailored dinners—optimizing nutrition for Niko, mental focus for Miwa, and skin health for Kazuki. While Niko and Miwa join him, Kazuki refuses. When Yu confronts her at school, his phrasing accidentally implies inappropriate intentions, causing a misunderstanding. Seeking advice from Miwa, he recognizes that her genius isolates her despite her popularity. Relating to her loneliness, he learns that Kazuki once asked their mother to prepare a meal just for her. Despite developing a fever, Kazuki continues rejecting Yu's recovery meals. He offers to rehearse lines with her, but she dismisses him when his acting proves untrained. After four days, she notices his persistent efforts and allows him to stay. Unexpectedly, he delivers his lines flawlessly, moved to tears imagining his mother's pride. Kazuki finally admits his cooking is fine—she is simply an extremely picky eater.
3	"I Want Us to Be a Family"; Transliteration: "Kazoku ni, Naritai" (Japanese: 家族に、なりたい。)	Ryutaro Suzuki	Takayo Ikami	Ryutaro Suzuki	"One Road" by Aoi Koga	July 24, 2025
Yu begins watching a drama starring his late mother, hoping to understand family dynamics, and explains his desire to become part of the sisters' lives. Misinterpreting his intentions, they assume he intends to marry one of them. Throughout the evening, each sister has a flustered interaction with Yu, making them realize their growing feelings for him. While cleaning, Yu discovers an old photo of the sisters as children at a festival, though none admit ownership. Knowing they will be traveling separately for weekend events, he books hotels for them—unaware their destinations are in the same city. When Miwa arrives at her hotel, she finds Kazuki and Niko already there. Yu reveals he coordinated their stays after realizing their competitions were nearby and arranged for them to revisit the festival from their childhood. Initially resistant, the sisters relent when Yu points out the festival is attended by professionals in their respective fields. He takes them to rent yukata, where Niko—often called a tomboy—hesitates before choosing a feminine cherry blossom design after Yu calls her cute. Her sisters are stunned to see how radiant she looks in traditional attire, realizing a side of her they had never noticed before.
4	"A Memory the Sisters Can Share"; Transliteration: "San'nin no, Omoide o" (Japanese: 三人の、思い出を。)	Makoto Manaka	Takayo Ikami	Ryutaro Suzuki	"Sunrise Prism" by Yoshino Aoyama	July 31, 2025
As Kazuki is swarmed by fans, Yu slowly pulls her away, disguising her with a festival mask so she can reunite with her sisters. Slipping off unnoticed, he enters a "cross the lake" contest to win a commemorative photo with the shrine statue from their childhood picture. A priest remarks that the last victors, a decade prior, were three sisters who completed the challenge together. After several failed attempts, Yu finally secures the photo—only to realize the festival has been canceled due to rain. To his relief, the sisters waited for him, and they take a new photo together despite the downpour. Back at the hotel, Yu admits he forgot to book his own room. Reluctantly, the sisters allow him to stay, but the cramped quarters leave them all flustered and sleepless. Later, Yu finds a note revealing that the owner of the old photo stole it back from his bag, leaving him disappointed at not knowing which sister it belonged to. While he sleeps, the sisters finally break years of silence, reminiscing about their childhood—just as Yu had hoped. Miwa quietly reveals she was the one who kept the photo. The next day brings triumph: Kazuki passes her audition, while Niko and Miwa each win their respective competitions.
5	"A Father's Teachings"; Transliteration: "Chichi no, Oshie" (Japanese: 父の、教え。)	Kingenkai	Takayo Ikami	Tadahito Matsubayashi	"Aimai Graffiti" (曖昧グラフィティ) by Yurina Amami	August 7, 2025
Mr. Mikadono makes an unexpected visit, revealing his sole concern is maintaining his daughters' elite status. Upon learning about the festival outing, he accuses Yu of sabotaging their focus and threatens to expel him as a "talentless nobody". The sisters quickly intervene, insisting Yu's housekeeping is essential for their training. Though skeptical, their father relents. Afterward, the sisters withdraw again, skipping meals. Yu adapts by secretly packing their nutritionally tailored dinners into their school lunches, lifting their spirits. Each faces mounting pressure: Niko must impress her senior in an upcoming match, Miwa must decide about her next championship, and Kazuki prepares for her first female role after exclusively playing male characters (she is part of an all-female acting troupe). One evening, Kazuki confesses her nerves, realizing—like Yu with his cooking—persistence is key. In a sudden stumble, she and Yu accidentally kiss. While Yu brushes it off, Kazuki becomes preoccupied by the memory. When he suggests pretending it never happened, she grows furious. Struggling to focus on her audition, she storms home and startles Yu by demanding a date. Reluctantly, he agrees.
6	"This Is a Date"; Transliteration: "Kore wa, Dēto" (Japanese: これは、デート。)	Daisuke Chikushi	Takayo Ikami	Yoshiyuki Asai	"Aimai Graffiti" (曖昧グラフィティ) by Yurina Amami	August 14, 2025
While eavesdropping, Niko and Miwa are shocked to learn that Kazuki requires practice behaving like a woman for an audition. Secretly following Kazuki and Yu on their date, they observe Kazuki repeatedly acting in a masculine manner, amusing them as the outing appears unsuccessful. A persistent talent scout attempts to recruit Kazuki until Yu claims they intend to marry, embarrassing her with the sudden "proposal". Niko and Miwa grow dismayed when the date improves. During a movie, Kazuki recognizes the heroine as a senior actor who also portrays male roles but is disappointed by her unconvincing performance. Later, on a ferris wheel—notorious for fostering romantic couples—Kazuki reflects on her growing fear of failure despite her passion for acting. She considers quitting the audition until realizing Yu embraces failure after repeated setbacks. He shows her photos, revealing she appears most feminine when not consciously trying. Inspired, Kazuki resolves to attend the audition. Niko and Miwa remain curious about the ferris wheel encounter. Kazuki admits their accidental kiss was her first, making it impossible to ignore. The two realize they envy the attention Yu has given Kazuki.
7	"The True Reason Is..."; Transliteration: "Hontō no, Riyu wa" (Japanese: 本当の、理由は。)	Yasuo Fujii	Takayo Ikami	Yumi Kamakura & Sogamegumi	"One Road" by Aoi Koga	August 21, 2025
Hayato Tatsumi, a karate champion from Iwayama Academy, invites Niko to transfer schools and join his team. Niko explains to Yu that Iwayama is a boarding school where students' needs are meticulously managed by expert staff, making it ideal for her—except she would not see Yu or her sisters for months. Unexpectedly, she confesses she prefers to stay with Yu, but her teammates interrupt, declaring they also wish to remain together, frustrating Niko. At home, her sisters act uncharacteristically kind, which Yu interprets as their reluctance to let her leave. Niko grows anxious, uncertain of Yu's feelings. The next day, she declines Hayato's offer, provoking his anger. Yu intervenes, proposing that he train Niko instead—but only if he proves his superiority by defeating Hayato in a sparring match. Niko's heart flutters as Yu's challenge sounds almost like a proposal. Hayato accepts but grants Yu time to learn karate. During training, Yu abruptly questions why Niko refused Hayato's offer, which seemed perfect for her. Flustered, she admits she would miss her family. Overhearing, her embarrassed sisters offer to help prepare Yu. He then reveals his challenge letter included a hidden handicap: Hayato cannot use his dominant hand or foot.
8	"You Will Win No Matter What"; Transliteration: "Zettai, Katemasu" (Japanese: 絶対、勝てます。)	Tomoaki Ōta	Takayo Ikami	Ryutaro Suzuki	"One Road" by Aoi Koga	August 28, 2025
Miwa and Kazuki support Yu by helping around the house, only to burn dinner. With Yu's hands numb from training they take turns feeding him, making them realise helping others makes them feel good. Hayato undermines Niko by claiming she has lost her warrior spirit by relying on Yu. Niko realises everyone only values her strength, never allowing her to feel like a girl. Yu points out she acts like a girl a lot more than she realises, and there is no reason to choose between being strong and feminine since she is already both. Niko wants to choose for herself but also wants Yu to help. Yu has an idea how they can fight Hayato together. On the day of the fight Yu demands a second match where Hayato must fight Niko, and if he loses either fight Niko can stay. Yu loses his fight instantly. With Yu encouraging her Niko begins her fight but Hayato counters every move, having watched her fight since they were children. Niko considers surrender but Yu leads the audience in a supporting chant. Niko is encouraged and switches from traditional karate to free form, confusing Hayato so much he is defeated in three moves. Niko is so happy she cries in front of her team, deciding it is alright for a girl to cry now and then.
9	"I'll Make You Swoon"; Transliteration: "Kyun o, Kureteyaru" (Japanese: キュンを、くれてやる。)	Sogamegumi	Yoko Yonaiyama	Yoshiyuki Asai	"Sunrise Prism" by Yoshino Aoyama	September 4, 2025
Hayato reveals that Yu's earlier intervention, which left his leg badly bruised, was instrumental in Niko's victory, while also confessing his own unrequited feelings for her; in gratitude, Niko offers Yu any reward, and he requests a group visit to a theme park, which he later convinces Mr. Mikadono to permit by arguing the girls deserve a respite to prevent being overworked. Each sister devises a romantic scheme for the outing: Kazuki takes Yu into a haunted house intending to feign fear but must instead comfort him, Miwa brings him on a rollercoaster planning to pretend to faint yet ends up caring for him when he faints, and Niko's plan to fall into his arms on a spinning teacup ride fails when he almost falls off. The sisters consequently realize Yu's sole intention was for them to enjoy themselves, and as a reward they pose for a family photo, which makes him blush intensely, surprising them that such a simple gesture succeeded where their elaborate plans failed, leaving Miwa on the train home with a profound reluctance to return when an important shogi match approaches.
10	"The Shadow of a Genius"; Transliteration: "Tensai no, Kage" (Japanese: 天才の、陰。)	Ryutaro Suzuki	Takayo Ikami	Ryutaro Suzuki	"Sunrise Prism" by Yoshino Aoyama	September 11, 2025
On the day of an important shogi match, Miwa forgets her lunch, which Yu delivers. He witnesses her struggle before ultimately winning. Their celebration is interrupted by Sakura Yaotome, who declares herself Miwa's rival and blames Yu for Miwa's recent decline in skill despite still winning her matches. Vowing to finally defeat her, Sakura accidentally falls onto Yu, dropping her lunch and outraging Miwa. Yu perceives that, despite their constant fighting, Sakura may be Miwa's closest friend. Before their official match, Yu, Nico, and Kazuki visit a shrine for shogi players and find Sakura there also praying. Discovering Yu lives with the sisters, Sakura accuses him of hiding in their shadow instead of cultivating his own talent, contrasting her own un-gifted but hard-earned skills with Miwa's natural genius. During the first of their five matches, Miwa surprisingly loses. She later skips dinner to practice, but Yu stays up late to prepare a special snack designed to reduce her mental fatigue.
11	"I Already Knew It"; Transliteration: "Wakatteta, Koto" (Japanese: わかってた、コト。)	Makoto Manaka	Yoko Yonaiyama	Jun'ichi Sakata	"Sunrise Prism" by Yoshino Aoyama	September 18, 2025
Miwa loses her second shogi match against Sakura, who mocks her to Yu, asserting that Miwa has relied on her natural genius for too long instead of dedicated practice. Learning that Miwa left home after being cruel to her sisters, Yu finds her at a cat café. She confesses that, unlike most players who possess a genuine love for the game, she plays shogi only to prove herself as accomplished as her sisters and to earn praise from her father. Yu takes her grocery shopping to select gifts to apologize, with Miwa choosing coffee jelly for Kazuki and a cupcake for Nico. Using the school kitchen to prepare the gifts, Yu explains his own cooking proficiency stems from a period when he obsessively practiced after his ailing mother praised a meal he made, which ultimately helped repair their relationship. He assures Miwa that desiring praise is not a bad motive, as it signifies a wish to make someone proud. After Yu falls asleep, Miwa creates a marshmallow doll of him and kisses it. Her sisters are deeply touched by their gifts, and Miwa gives the doll to Yu. Although her sisters notice the kiss mark on the doll, they do not comprehend its significance. Miwa then prepares for her third and potentially final match against Sakura.
12	"For Someone Else"; Transliteration: "Dareja no, Tame" (Japanese: 誰かの、ため。)	Hiroki Yamamoto	Takayo Ikami	Tadahito Matsubayashi	"Kimi ni Fusawashii Kiseki" (君にふさわしい奇跡) by Maisondes	September 25, 2025
Miwa attends her third match, claiming she now plays only for the pride of her sisters and Yu. Her opponent, Sakura, recalls learning shogi from her grandfather at age three and surpassing him within a year. She dominated children's tournaments until her first match against Miwa, who defeated her swiftly. Although Miwa praised her skill, Sakura never overcame the loss. Miwa wins their third game, and Sakura is pleased to see her rival's confidence restored. Miwa proceeds to win the fourth and fifth matches, retaining her championship title. She immediately runs to Yu, who is crying with happiness, and impulsively kisses his forehead, dismissing it as a European greeting. Yu believes her, but her sisters are outraged until she kisses them as well. Sakura feels a brief jealousy that Yu shares this moment with Miwa but consoles herself that even a pawn can stand next to a queen. Life returns to normal, and as Yu bids them farewell one morning, he wonders if he has finally found the happy family his mother wished for him. Later, Miwa becomes outraged when Yu permits Sakura to visit and stay overnight to discover the secret behind her success.

== Reception ==
By July 2024, the manga had over 1 million copies in circulation. By June 2025, it had over 1.5 million copies in circulation.

The series was nominated for the Next Manga Award in the print category in 2022, and ranked 15th; it ranked eighth in the 2023 edition in the same category. The series also ranked second in the Nationwide Publishers' Recommended Comics of 2023. It was nominated for the 71st Shogakukan Manga Award in 2025.

== See also ==
- Kunisaki Izumo no Jijō, another manga series by the same author
- Tenshi to Akuto!!, another manga series by the same author
