= Fujiko Fujima =

Japanese dancer (1907–1998)

Fujiko Fujima (藤間 藤子, Fujima Fujiko; October 31, 1907 – October 14, 1998) was a Japanese dancer. She was the first woman in the field of kabuki to be named a Living National Treasure.

== Early life ==
Fujima was born Kimiyo Tanaka on October 31, 1907 in Tokyo, Japan. She was adopted by the Fujima family and began studying traditional Japanese dance under Fujima Kan'emon II as a child. She took her professional name in 1926.

== Career ==
In 1929 Fujima managed a dance troupe. The group went on hiatus during World War II, and restarted their activities in 1947. Her grandson, Fujima Rankoh, became the head of the group later. She also performed abroad in theaters like the Japan America Theater in Los Angeles.

Fujima excelled at dances for male characters that are accompanied by tokiwazu music. Her most famous performances are Kikujido and Kagekiyo. The latter won the Education Minister's Theater Festival Prize in 1955. She also choreographs dances for kabuki, most notably Masakado and Seki no To. She took great care to teach her students about precise hand motions and the ways that people of different social classes and emotional states may carry themselves in a dance. Her students include several kabuki actors, and two iemoto of the Fujima school.

Fujima has been awarded many prizes, including the Buto Geijutsu sho in 1956, the Geijutsu Seisho in 1962, the Medal of Honor (purple ribbon) in 1970, Japan Art Academy Prize in 1979, the Matsuo Art Award in 1984. In 1985 Fujima was the first woman in the male-dominated field of kabuki to be designated a Living National Treasure in that field. She also served as the vice president of the Nihon Buto Kyokai.

== Death and legacy ==
Fujima adopted a daughter, who followed her in Japanese dance. Her two grandsons also became Japanese dancers. Fujima died of stomach cancer in Tokyo on October 14, 1998.
