= Traditional Japanese music =

Japanese music genre

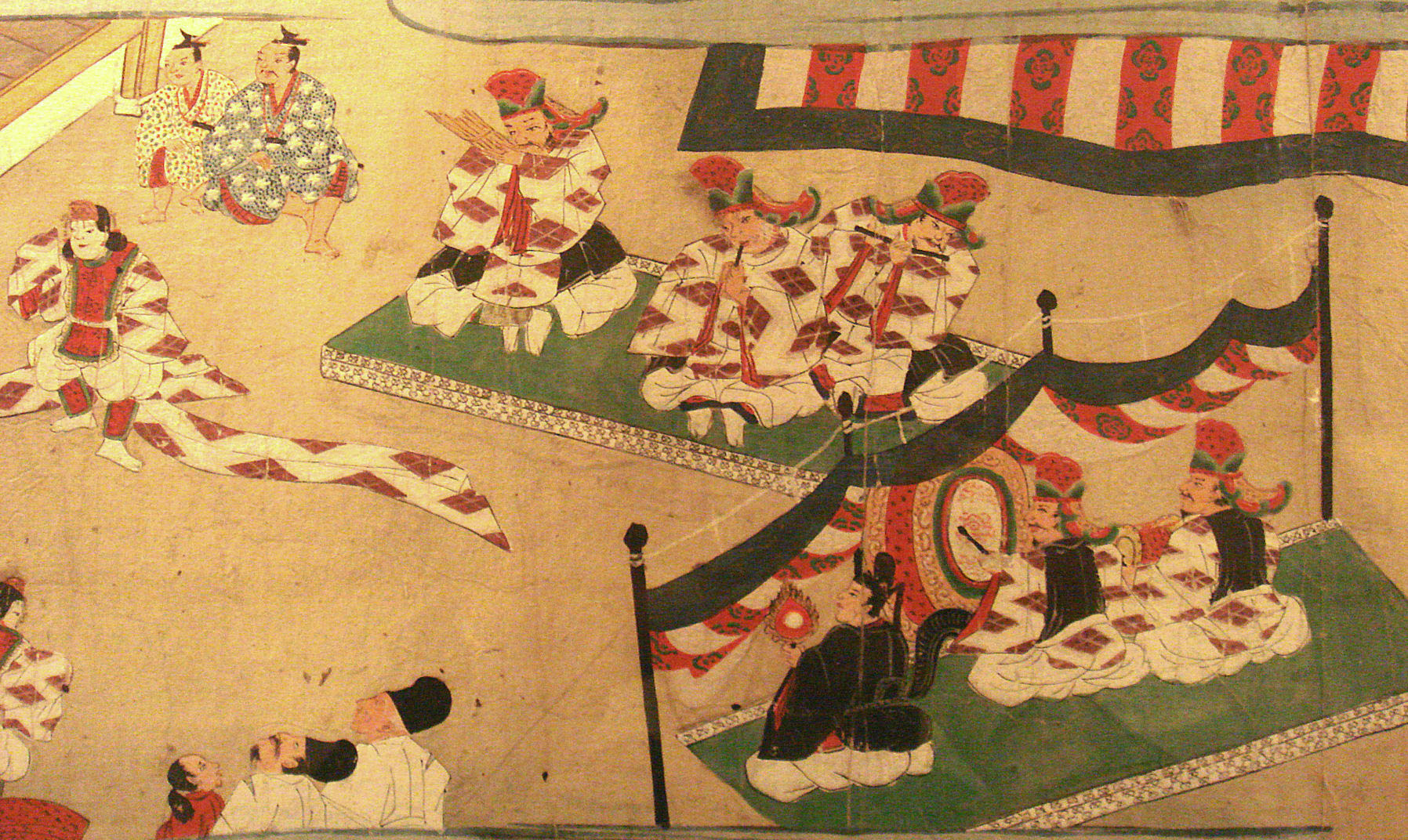
Musicians and dancer, Muromachi period

Traditional Japanese music is the folk or traditional music of Japan. Japan's Ministry of Education classifies hōgaku (邦楽, lit. 'Japanese music') as a category separate from other traditional forms of music, such as gagaku (court music) or shōmyō (Buddhist chanting), but most ethnomusicologists view hōgaku, in a broad sense, as the form from which the others were derived. Outside of ethnomusicology, however, hōgaku usually refers to Japanese music from around the 17th to the mid-19th century. Within this framework, there are three types of traditional music in Japan: theatrical, court music, and instrumental.

== Theatrical ==
Japan has several theatrical forms of drama in which music plays a significant role. The main forms are kabuki and Noh.

=== Noh ===
Noh (能) or nōgaku (能楽) music is a type of theatrical music used in Noh theatre. Noh music is played by an instrumental ensemble called hayashi-kata (囃子方). The instruments used are the taiko (太鼓) stick drum, a large hourglass-shaped drum called the ōtsuzumi (大鼓), a smaller hourglass-shaped drum called the kotsuzumi (小鼓), and a bamboo flute called the nohkan (能管). The hayashi ensemble is performed along with yōkyoku, vocal music, in Noh theater.

=== Kabuki ===
Kabuki (歌舞伎) is a type of Japanese theatre known for its highly stylized dancing and singing as well as the elaborate make-up worn by the predominately all-male cast. The first instances of kabuki used the hayashi from Noh performances. Later, kabuki began incorporating other instruments like the shamisen. Kabuki music can be divided into three categories: geza, shosa-ongaku, and ki and tsuke.

==== Geza ====
Geza includes music and sound effects played on stage, behind a black bamboo curtain called a kuromisu. Geza music can be further subdivided into three types. The first type is uta or song. Uta is sung accompanied by a shamisen. Typically there are multiple uta singers singing together. The second type is called aikata. It involves shamisen music without any singing. The third type is narimono. Narimono is played by small percussion instruments besides the shamisen.

==== Shosa-ongaku ====
Shosa-ongaku encompasses music that is played on the stage and accompanies acting and dancing. Shosa-ongaku includes the takemoto, nagauta, tokiwazu and kiyomoto music styles. takemoto accompanies acting. Nagauta, taena mo and kiyomoto accompany dancing in kabuki. Takemoto basically recites the parts of the play concerning scenery. The actors attempt to synchronize their lines with the rhythm of takemoto—an effect known as ito ni noru ('get onto strings').

Nagauta is one of the most commonly seen forms of geza. It involves singers, called utakata, and shamisen players, called shamisenkata. The utakata are seated to the right of the stage dancers, and the shamisenkata are seated on the left of the stage. The shamisenkata use hosozao (thin neck) shamisen which produce high pitched tones and are capable of producing delicate melodies.

Tokiwazu consists of reciters called tayū and shamisenkata that use chuzao (medium-neck) shamisen. Tokiwazu is similar to kiyomoto music but is slower-paced and more solemn. Tokiwazu is also performed onstage.

Kiyomoto also consists of tayū and shamisenkata using chuzao. However, in kiyomoto words and sentences full of emotion are recited in very high-pitched tones.

==== Ki and tsuke ====
Ki and tsuke describe the distinctive sounds made by striking two square oak boards. When the two boards are struck together, they produce the ki sound. When they are struck against a hardwood board, they produce the tsuke sound.

== Court music (gagaku) ==
Gagaku (雅楽) is court music, and is the oldest traditional music in Japan. It was usually patronized by the Imperial Court or the shrines and temples. Gagaku music includes songs, dances, and a mixture of other Asian music. Gagaku has two styles; these are instrumental music kigaku (器楽) and vocal music seigaku (声楽).

Since 雅 means "elegance", gagaku literally means elegant music and generally refers to musical instruments and music theory imported into Japan from China and Korea from 500 to 600 CE. Gagaku is divided into two main categories: Old Music and New Music. Old Music refers to music and musical compositions from before the Chinese Tang dynasty (618–906). New Music refers to music and compositions produced during or after Tang, including music brought from various regions of China and Korea.

Old and New Music are further divided into the categories 左楽 ("Music of the Left") and 右楽 ("Music of the Right"). Music of the left 左楽 is composed of 唐楽 (music from Tang) and 林邑楽 (music from Indo-China). Music of the right 右楽 is composed of 高麗楽 (music from Korea).

- Instrumental Music
  - Kangen (管弦)—a Chinese form of music
  - Bugaku (舞楽)—influenced by Tang dynasty China and Balhae
    - Dainichido Bugaku
- Vocal Music
  - Kumeuta (久米歌)—Kume song
  - Kagurauta (神楽歌)—Kagura song
  - Azumaasobi (東遊び)—entertainment of Eastern Japan
  - Saibara (催馬楽)—vocal Japanese court music
  - Rōei (朗詠)—songs based on Chinese poems

== Shōmyō ==
Shōmyō (声明) is a kind of Buddhist chanting of sutra syllabically or melismatically set to melodic phrasing, usually performed by a male chorus. Shōmyō came from India, and it began in Japan in the Nara period. Shōmyō is sung a capella by one or more Buddhist monks.

The two characters (声 and 明) translate literally as "voice" and "clear" respectively. Shōmyō is a translation of the Sanskrit word sabda-vidya, which means "the (linguistic) study of language".

== Jōruri ==
Jōruri (浄瑠璃) is narrative music using the shamisen (三味線). There are four main jōruri styles. These are centuries-old traditions which continue today:

- Gidayubushi (義太夫節)—during the Edo period, Takemoto Gidayu (竹本義太夫) began to play jōruri in Osaka. This type of jōruri is for bunraku (puppet theater).
- Tokiwazubushi (常磐津節)—during the Edo period, Tokiwazu Mojidayu (常磐津文字太夫) began to play this style of jōruri in Edo. This type of jōruri is for kabuki dances called Shosagoto.
- Kiyomotobushi (清元節)—Kiyomoto Enjyudayu (清元延寿太夫) began to play this for kabuki dances in Edo (Tokyo) in 1814 during the late Edo period. He played tomimoto-bushi style at first, before moving from playing this style to the kiyomotobushi style. This style is light, refreshingly unrestrained, and chic.
- Shinnaibushi (新内節)—in the middle of the Edo period, Tsuruga Shinnai (鶴賀新内) began to play this for kabuki. This style of jōruri is typically lively and upbeat.

There are other four jōruri styles which have largely died out. Katōbushi, icchuubushi and miyazonobushi are old style. These styles are referred to as Kokyoku (古曲) or "old music". Kokyoku also included ogiebushi (荻江節). It is not jōruri but is like nagauta.

- Katōbushi (河東節)—during the Edo period, Masumi Katō (十寸見河東) (1684–1725) began to play in an original style in 1717. It is heavy.
- Icchuubushi or Itchubushi (一中節)—during the Edo period, Miyako Icchuu (都一中) or Miyakodayuu Icchuu (都太夫一中) (1650–1724) began to play this style.
- Miyazonobushi (宮薗節) or Sonohachibushi (薗八節)—during the Edo period, Miyakoji Sonohachi (宮古路薗八) began to play this style in Kyoto. Miyazonobushi is a modest style.
- Tomimotobushi (富本節)—During the Edo period, Tomimoto Buzennojō (富本豊前掾) (1716–1764) began to play this style. He played the tokiwazubushi style at first and then changed to play in the tomimotobushi style.

== Nagauta ==
Nagauta (長唄) is a style of music played using the shamisen. There are three styles of nagauta: one for kabuki dance, one for kabuki plays (dialogue), and one for music unconnected with kabuki.

Ogiebushi (荻江節) is similar to nagauta. Ogie Royuu I (荻江露友) (died 1787) began to play this style, having first played in the nagauta style. He moved from playing this style to play in the ogiebushi style. His rival was Fujita Kichiji (富士田吉治), a nagauta singer in Edo. Ogie Royuu I had a beautiful but small voice. In a theater a voice with volume was important, so Ogie Royuu I stopped singing in the theater. Ogie Royuu I began to play in the Yoshiwara (red-light district). Ogiebushi declined after 1818. Tamaya Yamazaburou (玉屋山三郎) composed new ogiebushi pieces at the end of the Edo period. Yamazaburou was an owner of a parlor house in the red-light district of Yoshiwara. Yamazaburou knew music very well. Tamaya Yamazaburou's pieces are influenced by jiuta (地歌) music. Iijima Kizaemon (飯島喜左衛門) re-established ogiebushi. Kizaemon changed his name to Ogie Royuu IV in 1876 or 1879. (It is not known if there was an Ogie Royuu II or Ogie Royuu III.) Ogiebushi is classified as a style of "old music" (古曲, Kokyoku). (Kyoku usually means a musical piece or musical number in modern Japanese.) Now kokyoku is Katohbushi (河東節), Icchuubushi (一中節), Miyazonobushi (宮薗節) and Ogiebushi (荻江節). Kokyoku is old music from the Edo period. Not many players perform kokyoku and those who do are elderly; there are few young musicians playing this music.

== Shakuhachi music ==
Shakuhachi (尺八) music began in the Edo period. Buddhist monks played the shakuhachi as a substitute for a sutra. Sometimes the shakuhachi is played along with other instruments.

== Sōkyoku ==
Sōkyoku (筝曲) uses the Japanese koto (琴), which differs from the Chinese guzheng. There are two well known families of sōkyoku, which can be distinguished by the shape of the plectra used in playing.

- Yamata ryu—originating in Western Japan, the Yamata ryu style uses pointed oval-shaped plectra. The repertoire consists of classical pieces composed during the Edo period. This style contains more pieces that accompany singing.
- Ikuta ryu—originating in Eastern Japan, the ikuta ryu style uses a square-shaped plectra. In addition to classical pieces, ikuta ryu also encompasses more recently composed music such as shinnihonongaku (新日本音楽), thus the majority of modern koto performers belong to this style of sōkyoku.

== Traditional music in modern culture ==
Traditional Japanese musicians sometimes collaborate with modern Western musicians. Also, musicians create new styles of Japanese music influenced by the West but still use traditional musical instruments.

== Traditional musical instruments ==
=== Chordophones ===
- Biwa (琵琶)
- Koto (琴)
- Ichigenkin (一絃琴)
- Yamatogoto (大和琴)
- Sanshin (三線)
- Shamisen (三味線)
- Kokyū (胡弓)

=== Aerophones ===
- Shakuhachi (尺八)
- Hocchiku (法竹)
- Ryuteki (龍笛)
- Nohkan (能管)
- Shinobue (篠笛)
- Hichiriki (篳篥)
- Shō (笙)
- Yu (竽)
- Horagai (法螺貝)

=== Membranophones ===
- Taiko (太鼓)
- Kakko (鞨鼓)
- Shime-daiko (締太鼓)
- Otsuzumi (大鼓)
- Kotsuzumi (小鼓)
- Tsuzumi (鼓)

=== Idiophones ===
- Hyoshigi (拍子木)
- Shōko (鉦鼓)

== Traditional cultural events ==
- Kabuki
- Noh
- Rakugo
- Bunraku
- Japanese festivals (祭, matsuri)
  - Jidai Matsuri
  - Aoi Matsuri
  - Gion Matsuri
  - Hōnen Matsuri
  - Danjiri Matsuri
  - Kishiwada Danjiri Matsuri
- Geisha
- Maiko

== Artists ==
- Yoshida Brothers
- Rin'

== See also ==
- Music of Japan
- Culture of Japan
- Shinto
- Buddhism in Japan
- Religion in Japan
- History of Japan
- Tsugaru-jamisen
