= Jiuta =

Style of traditional Japanese music

Jiuta (地歌/地唄/ぢうた) is a style of traditional Japanese music. In the Edo period (1603–1867), pieces in the jiuta style were played on the shamisen, and were mostly regional to Kamigata. The name jiuta means 'song' (歌, uta) of 'a place' or 'a region' (地, ji) (Kamigata in this instance), and suggests "not a song from Edo".

In the Edo period, jiuta were performed, composed and instructed by the Tōdōza, a guild of blind men; due to this, jiuta is also called Houshiuta (法師唄, 'song of monks'). Jiuta, as well as nagauta, is a typical form of Utaimono (歌いもの, lyrical music) in traditional Japanese music.

Jiuta traces its oldest origins to shamisen music, and is the predecessor of a number of later shamisen pieces, having greatly influence the development of the genre throughout the Edo period; it can be said that both jōruri and nagauta stem from jiuta. In the present day, jiuta has spread across Japan, and in its course has been integrated into sōkyoku (music for the koto), and has strong ties with both shakuhachi and kokyū traditions.

Despite the heavy involvement of many other forms of shamisen music in the development of the traditional performing arts, such as bunraku and kabuki, the form of jiuta retains a strong character as purely instrumental music relatively independent of these traditions.

== Overview ==
As a form of shamisen music, jiuta was established in Kamigata region in its early stage, then it was performed in Edo around Genroku era. Later, jiuta would change its form as musical accompaniment of kabuki in Edo; this new form was called nagauta. Due to the further popularization of the music of bunraku, the original jiuta came to have less occasion to be performed. Until the end of Edo period, jiuta had spread around not only Kamigata but also, to the east, Nagoya, and to the west, Chūgoku region, and Kyusyu region. After the Meiji period, jiuta was once again promoted toward Tokyo (formerly Edo), then spread out rapidly.

Today jiuta is popular in traditional music field across Japan, except in Okinawa. However, in Tokyo, the impression of jiuta is as the musical accompaniment of jiutamai (地歌舞, jiuta dance), and it is regarded that the music is composed according to the character of jiutamai, with elegant and quiet feeling. However, the truth is that jiutamai was created as dance accompaniment for jiuta, not opposite. The repertory of jiutamai is only a part of jiuta repertory, and jiuta music itself requires more technical playing than other shamisen music, so that there are a lot of pieces which have strong character as instrumental music. Having said that, jiuta also has character as a part of traditional vocal music and developed along with it.

== History ==
=== Early years in Edo period ===
==== Introduction of the shamisen and origin of jiuta ====
It can be regarded that introduction of the shamisen and the birth of jiuta occurred at the almost same time; therefore, jiuta has the longest history amongst varieties of shamisen music. The sanxian (Chinese lute) arrived in Japan at Sakai, Osaka via Ryukyu near the end of the Sengoku period. Blind musicians known as biwa hōshi at Tōdōza improved the instrument and created what would be the shamisen. They used the plectrum of the Japanese biwa to play the shamisen, thus creating the beginning of jiuta as shamisen music.

Ishimura-Kengyo is particularly regarded as originator of shamisen music. After that, musicians, mainly at Tōdōza, performed, composed and handed down jiuta. The existing oldest piece is considered as a work of the early years of Edo period.

=== Mid-Edo period ===
==== Emergence of nagauta ====
Around the Genroku era, "long songs" (長歌, nagauta), which feature a consistent story, appeared. Kengyo (検校), a blind official often engaged in music, apparently started to compose nagauta in Edo. The famous composers are Asari-kengyo and Sayama-Kengyo, and it seems that before long composers in Kamigata also took this style for their work. In the course of time, nagauta came to be used as musical accompaniment of kabuki.

==== Emergence of tegotomono ====
Another tide around this era, instrumental aspect was focused intensively as well as vocal composition, so that pieces took an instrumental part without vocal, typically it was located in the middle part of a song. This musical interlude, instrumental part between singing is called tegoto (手事, performed by hand, not vocal), and this style is called tegotomono (手事もの, "thing of tegoto").

In the early stages of the emergence of tegotomono, simple works were common; however, this style developed hugely in the later Edo period and gained status as the mainstream type of music of jiuta.

==== Emergence of hauta and its boom ====
Miscellaneous pieces which are not categorized as above were also composed. These kind of pieces are called hauta (端歌, "short song").

Hauta contain some elements of popular music and light music, and this character of the style became the contact points between jiuta and popular songs. Hauta were composed not only by professional blind musicians, but also by amateur musicians, whose works were generally lyrical. In the middle of the 18th century, a great number of hauta were composed, with the style becoming more sophisticated as a result. The center of that boom was Osaka. Notable pieces were Yuki (雪, "snow"), Kurokami (黒髪, "black hair"), and Tsuru no koe (鶴の声, "voice of a crane").

==== Sankyoku and sankyoku ensembles ====
Originally, blind musicians were engaged in three instruments used in jiuta – the shamisen, koto and kokyū – from the early years of Edo period. The all-inclusive term for these three instruments is sankyoku (三曲, "piece for three").

These three instruments developed on their own course, and developed their own musical genres (shamisen for jiuta, koto for sōkyoku (筝曲, "piece for koto"), kokyū for kokyugaku); ensembles including all three did not exist in early years. In the Genroku era, Ikuta-kengyou in Kyoto began creating ensemble pieces with shamisen and koto, hence jiuta and sōkyoku developed concurrently afterwards. Most of the existing pieces are composed by shamisen with an added koto part, so it can be regarded that jiuta was initially created as shamisen music, before sōkyoku came to develop with jiuta concurrently or afterwards.

The kokyū was often used together with other instruments, before finally all three instruments – shamisen, koto and kokyū – were used together, creating the sankyoku ensemble.

==== Emergence of utaimono and influence from Noh and jōruri ====
At the end of the 18th century, fujio-koutou (勾当, a blind official of lower class than kengyo) composed many jiuta pieces which feature lyrics and stories taken from Noh. This was called utaimono. From the Genroku era to the end of 18th century, musical elements from jōruri were introduced into jiuta. Thus, jiuta has some relation with performing arts such as Noh and jōruri.

==== Emergence of sakumono ====
Around same time, a genre called sakumono (作もの) emerged. This genre has comical contents. For example, animals such as rats, snails and raccoon doga are protagonists and make efforts to escape from difficult situations. Narrativity dominates this genre and sound effects are used.

Sakumono is referred to special category within the field of jiuta, and requires variety of highly trained technical skills.

=== Later years in the Edo period ===
==== Maturity of tegotomono ====
From the middle to the end of Edo period, pieces which had high musical achievement were composed. Key developments were long interludes and instrumental parts between blocks of vocal parts called tegoto. Many pieces in this style, known as tegotomono, have been handed down and are extant today.

Minesaki-koutou, active in the end of 18th century in Osaka, achieved success in the tegotomono field. He defined tegoto as long and technical instrumental parts within a piece and composed great number of pieces which focused on the shamisen's technical playing. His follower, Mitsuhashi-koutou, increased the tegoto part within a piece, resulting in tegoto becoming longer and more varied than ever. As a result, jiuta came to have and emphasized instrumental part in the course of its development.

==== Beginning of polyphonic composition and development of ensemble ====
Around the Bunka era, Ichiura-kengyo from Osaka elaborated the ensemble playing of the koto. Most previous compositions had been almost in unison in koto ensembles; in contrast, Ichiura began composing polyphonic ensembles. Polyphonic parts for the koto were known as kaete (替手, "to change hand"), a style which Yaezaki-kengyo sophisticated. Ensemble playing of the shamisen was also popular in that era, and kaete pieces for shamisen were also composed.

Another similar style was uchiawase; composition of another piece based on an original piece, which would be played at the same time.

==== Major development of kyōmono ====
Later, the majority of tegotomono composition moved to Kyoto. At first, Matsuura-kengyo composed a number of sophisticated tegotomono in the Kyoto style; tegotomono composed in Kyoto were called Kyōmono (京もの, "thing of Kyoto") or kyōryu tegotomono (京流手事もの, "tegotono in Kyoto style"). Kikuoka-kengyo (1792–1847 composed tegotomono and contributed its development in Kyoto. Yaezaki-kengyo (1776–1848), who was also active in same era, composed the koto part of most pieces and arranged Kikuoka's compositions. The two musicians contributed greatly to their development, and can be said to have created the heyday of jiuta as a style; by integrating jiuta and sōkyoku together, here jiuta reached the perfection of its craft as shamisen music.

==== Improvement of shamisen plectrum ====
Around this era, Tsuyama-kengyo from Osaka invented an improved plectrum used in jiuta playing.

==== Emergence of independent sōkyoku ====
Mitsusaki-kengyo, a junior fellow musician of Kikuoka-kengyo, was active then. He was also a pupil of Yaezaki-kengyo. He focused on the koto because it had the possibility to develop more than jiuta, which had been developed far enough that there seemed to be little room to develop further. He composed some pieces featuring a solo koto, and this became a trigger to develop sōkyoku independently. Yoshizawa-kengyo took over and promoted this movement, then began to develop it gradually.

==== Integrated parts ====
Mitsusaki-kengyo composed traditional jiuta, and in his original works, he composed both parts of shamisen and koto as the only composer, a novel concept at the time. Thus the instrumental parts were integrated and refined. His junior followers also took over this method. One of his followers, Yoshizawa-kengyo, went further; he composed three instrumental parts of shamisen, koto and kokyū by himself.

In the last years of the Edo period, jiuta became popular across Japan and was influenced and integrated into local styles of music.

=== After the Meiji period ===
==== Disorder after the Meiji Restoration and popularization of jiuta ====
In the Meiji period, sōkyoku developed independently, and composition of jiuta declined. Jiuta composition did not disappear entirely, and some composers continued to create their own works; however, tunes composed only for the koto increased overwhelmingly. Jiuta, having already reached its perfection, saw little further room for improvement or innovation, whereas the koto could easily deal with the tonal scale elements from Western music and Chinese music. The modernising and fresh spirit of the Meiji period was suitable for the tone of the koto better than the shamisen, whose Edo-period sound reminded people of love affairs and the pleasure districts.

As the new government dissolved todoza, musicians there lost their status, which had previous been protected by the privilege system, and musical activity changed accordingly. Kengyo who lost their authority faced hardship, and had to earn their living by appearing in popular theater. Meanwhile, jiuta music had a chance once again to be well known by the general public, specifically in the eastern part of Japan such as Tokyo, where jiuta was not so much performed. Many musicians from the western part of Japan, such as the Kyusyu region and Osaka, found their way to Tokyo.

Later, after the period that Western things were valued exclusively had gone, jiuta became a popular music spread whole of country as well as sōkyoku and shakuhachi, and developed a wide range of listeners. Meanwhile, new compositions of jiuta reduced. However, the koto had taken a larger role in compositions in place of the shamisen, and pieces in the jiuta style accompanied by shamisen were far fewer in number. One notable composer was Michio Miyagi.

Up to today, composers habe tried to introduce various forms (such as Western sonatas) to the jiuta style. Today, sankyoku ensembles consists of the shamisen, koto and shakuhachi. The shakuhachi has replaced the role of the kokyū in modern sankyoku ensembles, though ensembles with the kokyū have not disappeared entirely.

== Musical features ==
In early modern Japanese music which involved the use of the shamisen, one feature was for a shamisen player to sing their own accompaniment. Jiuta flourished in the Kyoto and Osaka regions, and thus was called kamigatauta (上方唄, "song of Kamigata") or hōshiuta (法師唄, "song of monks") played by groups of blind men (see tōdōza).

After the middle of the Edo period, sankyoku – jiuta, sōkyoku and kokyugaku – started to contain common pieces to play in ensemble, then integrated themselves gradually, before finally consolidating with each other.

After end of the Edo period, sōkyoku, which had been developing along with jiuta, marked advanced development – thus jiuta sometimes is included in sōkyoku. However, originally jiuta was created for shamisen music, and early koto-oriented music such as Rokudan no shirabe accordingly is not jiuta in origin.

=== Introspective pieces ===
Most pieces for jiuta have been composed by blind musicians; thus, jiuta is regarded as an expression of emotion, and not of visual impression. As a musical style that has developed without relation to the performing arts, the general expression of jiuta is introspective and delicate, and less dramatically expressive than those styles developed in tandem and for accompaniment with the performing arts.

=== Polyphonic and diverse ensemble playing ===
Jiuta has the strongest aspects of instrumental ensemble among modern Japanese traditional music, as most of the pieces are played in ensemble. Along with the progress of tegotomono, polyphonic and complex ensemble playing also developed. Most pieces have parts for shamisen, koto and shakuhachi, with some including a kaete (counterpoint) part for shamisen.

=== Strong instrumental features ===
Tegotomono, which has a long instrumental interlude without a vocal part, is the most common and most often performed style of jiuta. This is because tegoto, the instrumental part, takes precedence over the vocal part. Some pieces make full use of the three octave range of the shamisen, which has led to the development of technically challenging shamisen parts.

Few pieces are purely instrumental; most include a vocal part. Some instrumental pieces for the koto, called danmono (段もの, "thing of parts and verses"), are arranged for shamisen. Most pieces in this style are considered to be highly artistic as pure instrumental music, not as a simple description of nature and emotion.

=== Shamisen technique ===
==== Wide range of octaves ====
There exists some tegotomono which require the use of up to 3 octaves, or 3 octaves and 3 degrees in the most extreme cases.

==== Techniques that require fine skill ====
There is extensive use of ornamental techniques such as portamento, tremolo in tegoto, and some other special techniques to express the nature sound such as sound of wind or insects. In contrast, the use of percussive techniques, which create dramatic effects when playing for performing arts, is rare.

==== Frequent modulation and tuning change ====
Most pieces have modulation at least once even if the piece is short, and pieces more than medium duration have frequent modulation. Common modulations are dominant key and sub-dominant key, though this is not always the case.

Most pieces more than medium duration have tuning change in middle of the piece at least once. Long pieces change tuning almost twice, and changing tuning three times is not uncommon. The purpose of tuning change is for modulation and to change the mood of the sound.

=== Vocal technique ===
==== Articulation ====
Singing usually uses the stretching of each one note, and its long vowel tone accompanies certain articulation. Hautamono especially features skill of articulation; some tegotomono pieces also focus on the articulation of singing. Vocal melody is based on the intonation of dialect of the Kansai region, where jiuta was born in.

==== Vocal melody employing a wide range of octaves ====
Vocal melodies in jiuta usually utilise about 2 octaves. The character of a piece decides whether to use high tones more often than low tones, depending on the intent of the song – for example, a song for a woman, or a requiem.

==== Narration ====
Pieces which contain a narrative vocal part are very rare.

==== Less dramatic expression ====
Jiuta has developed without a relation to the performing arts, and thus dramatic expression is less used.

== Classification of pieces ==
Great number of pieces and long history make Jiuta have many sub-styles. Thus classification is done by not only musical style, but also variety of viewpoint, accordingly a piece can belong to different class. Below are some examples.

- Class for musical style
  - Nagauta （'長歌' songs with solid story, long pieces are common）
  - Hauta （'端歌' miscellaneous pieces, relatively short and lyrical pieces）
  - Tegotomono （'手事物' pieces with Tegoto part）
  - Instrumental piece （without vocal part）
- Class for musical content and feeling
  - Sakumono （'作もの' pieces with comical stories, often employs Tegoto）
  - Shishimono （'獅子もの' pieces which has postfix 'shishi', which means lion, to its title, features solemn and splendour feeling. All the pieces of this type belong to Tegotomono）
- Class for location
  - Osakamono （'大阪もの' Tegotomono composed in Osaka）
  - Kyomono （'京もの' Tegotomono composed in Kyoto）
  - Nagoyamono （'名古屋もの' pieces composed by Yoshizawa-kengyo and his followers）
  - Kyusyumono （'九州もの' pieces composed in Kyusyu）

== See also ==
- Sankyoku
- Shakuhachi
- Kokyū
