= Living national treasure (Japan) =

Humans associated with Japanese culture

Living national treasure (人間国宝, Ningen Kokuhō) is a Japanese popular term for those individuals certified as preservers of important intangible cultural properties (重要無形文化財保持者, Jūyō Mukei Bunkazai Hojisha) by the Minister of Education, Culture, Sports, Science and Technology as based on Japan's Law for the Protection of Cultural Properties (文化財保護法, Bunkazai Hogohō). The term "living national treasure" is not formally mentioned in the law, but is an informal term referencing the cultural properties designated as the national treasures.

The Japanese government provides a subsidy of 2 million yen per person per year for living national treasures. The total amount of the subsidy is determined by the national budget, and since 2002 it has been 232 million yen. Therefore, the number of living national treasures in existence is a maximum of 116, and if there are 116 living national treasures, no person with any outstanding skills will be newly designated as a living national treasure unless a vacancy occurs due to death. By December 1, 2020, 371 persons had been designated as living national treasures, and as of February 1, 2021, 111 of them are still alive.

== History ==
Before 1947, a system for Imperial Household Artists (帝室技芸員, Teishitsu Gigei-in) was in place.

Under the 1950 Law for Protection of Cultural Properties, intangible cultural properties are defined as dramatic, musical, artistic, and other intangible cultural artifacts of high value in terms of Japanese history or art (Article 2, Section 1, Part 2). Those intangible cultural properties of especial importance can be designated as "Important Intangible Cultural Properties" by the Minister of Education, Culture, Sports, Science and Technology (Article 71, Section 1).

In other words, intangible cultural properties are certain artistic skills. Those individuals or groups who have attained high levels of mastery in those certain skills can be designated as preservers of them by the Japanese government for the purpose of ensuring their continuation. Living national treasure is a term for those designated as keepers of important intangible cultural properties. It is considered to be a great honor as a national living treasure.

== Types of certification ==
There are three types of certification:

- Individual certification (各個認定, Kakko Nintei): this designation is for individuals who "have attained high mastery" of an art or craft.
- Collective certification (総合認定, Sōgō Nintei): this designation is for groups of 2 or more who as a group working in common have attained high mastery of an art or craft.
- Preservation group certification (保持団体認定, Hoji Dantai Nintei): this designation is for large groups who have mastered an art or craft in which individual character is not emphasized.

Of the three types, generally only those to have received an individual certification are referred to as living national treasures. Those working in artistic fields such as drama and music receive individual and collective certifications, while those working in the crafts receive individual or preservation group certifications.

== Support system ==
The Japanese government, with the goal of preserving important intangible cultural assets, provides a special annual grant of 2 million yen to living national treasures. In the case of groups, the government helps defray the costs of public exhibitions and activities necessary to continue the group. The National Theater of Japan provides training programs to help train successors in such arts as Noh, bunraku, and kabuki.

Many of the craft artisans are also members of the Japan Kōgei Association.

== Categories ==
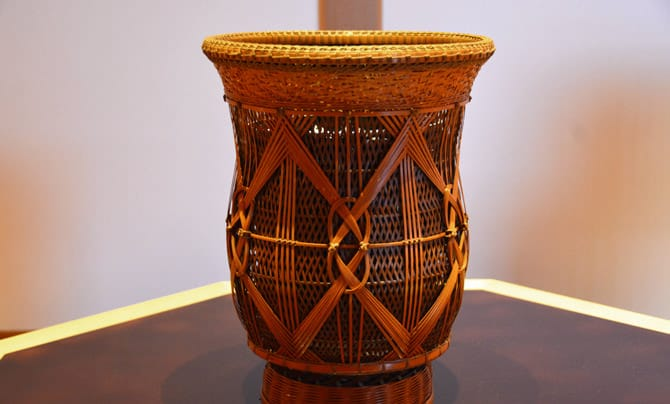
Woven bamboo flower basket (hanakago) for ikebana by living national treasure Hayakawa Shōkosai V, at the Kyoto State Guest House

To date living national treasures have been certified for 16 categories of intangible cultural properties:

- Performing arts: Gagaku, Noh, Bunraku, Kabuki, Kumi Odori, music, dance, and drama
- Japanese crafts: ceramics, textiles, lacquerware, metalworking, dollmaking, woodworking, papermaking, bamboo weaving, and miscellaneous crafts

== In popular culture ==
The concept of the living national treasure has appeared in both manga and anime (in both cases, the artists designated as living national treasures are kabuki actors):

- In Kageki Shojo!!, the father of the main protagonist Sarasa Watanabe, Shirakawa Kaou XV (Japanese: 十五代目 白川歌鷗, Hepburn: Jūgodaime Shirakawa Kaō) is a legendary kabuki actor specializing in tachiyaku roles (i.e. male roles), mainly aragoto roles (i.e. warrior and heroic characters with superhuman strength). It is said that he is the greatest tachiyaku actor of his time (and consequently, the greatest aragotoshi in kabuki) and that he was designated a living national treasure due to his spectacular and outstanding portrayal of important aragoto roles, such as Sukeroku/Soga Gorō from Sukeroku (which is considered his best role in his entire repertoire of successful roles in kabuki).
- In Kunisaki Izumo no Jijō, Anjuro Yukishima (Japanese: 幸嶋庵寿郎, Hepburn: Yukishima Anjūrō) is a legendary kabuki actor focused on onnagata roles (i.e. female roles) and who was designated a living national treasure due to his majestic performances on stage playing some of the more challenging onnagata roles (even though he is 90 years old), such as Akoya from Dan no Ura Kabuto Gunki (which is considered one of the most difficult onnagata roles in the entire repertoire of kabuki roles).

The designation is also central to the story of the 2025 live-action film Kokuho.

== Lists ==
- List of living national treasures of Japan (performing arts)
- List of living national treasures of Japan (crafts)

== See also ==
- Living National Treasure (South Korea)
- National Living Treasures of the Philippines (Gawad Manlilikha ng Bayan)
