= Kumi Odori =

Ryūkyūan dance

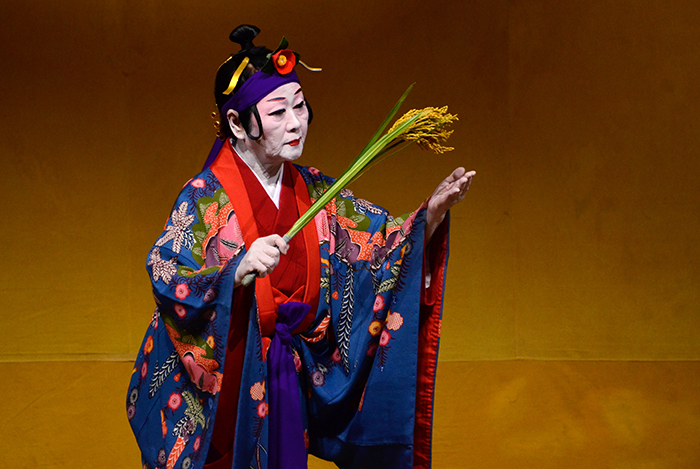
- Medium: Dance
- Originating culture: Ryūkyūan

Kumiodori, traditional Okinawan musical theatre
- UNESCO Intangible Cultural Heritage
- Country: Japan
- Reference: 00405
- Region: Asia and the Pacific

Inscription history
- Inscription: 2010 (5th session)
- List: Representative

Kumi odori (組踊; Okinawan: Kumi wudui) is a form of narrative traditional Ryūkyūan dance. Kumi odori or Kumi wudui means "combination dance" or "ensemble dance".

Originating in the Ryūkyūan capital of Shuri, Okinawa in 1719, the original purpose of this dance was to provide amusement and diversions, which were termed ukwanshin, for the Chinese diplomats who traveled to Ryūkyū. Tamagusuku Chokun, a Ryūkyūan courtier who lived from 1684 to 1734, is credited with the establishment of kumi odori as a frequently presented court demonstration. An amalgamation of several different types of East Asian dance, the kumi odori has continued to hold a place in Okinawan culture, and is now recognized by the Japanese government as an Important Intangible Cultural Property. In 2010 it was inscribed on the UNESCO Representative List of the Intangible Cultural Heritage of Humanity. It remains today a prime example of native art sustained by the people of Okinawa.

== Historical and political background ==
The Ryūkyū Islands are composed of more than 140 islands, 40 of which inhabited, that lie beneath the southernmost Japanese main islands. A point of contention throughout the years, ownership of Ryūkyū was often disputed by major powers. The island of Okinawa was first ruled by warlords, called either aji or anji, and was unified under the rule of Shō Hashi in the early fifteenth century (Smits 90). Eventually Okinawa conquered the rest of the Ryūkyū Islands, expanding its small kingdom. Trade was booming in East Asia in the late fifteenth and early sixteenth centuries and Ryūkyū's position as a middleman helped foster relationships with Japan and China. Once trade diminished, Ryūkyū faced the threat of invasion by Japan. In 1609, the Satsuma domain invaded the Ryūkyū Kingdom and forced the King to become their vassal in order to take advantage of its connections with China, and ruled only indirectly until the 1872 (Smits 91). Coincidentally, this actually served to promote Chinese culture. The ambiguity of Ryūkyū's political status while under Japanese control was a debate that concerned most of the elite. Even though it was under Japanese domination and its leaders were aware of this, it maintained its autonomy until 1879 (Smits 107). By this time, Ryūkyū began to come under more formal Japanese control. Emperor Meiji forced the Kingdom to become a Japanese feudal domain in 1872, and in 1879 it was made a prefecture of Japan, and then it was occupied by the United States from 1945 to 1972 following World War II and the Battle of Okinawa. In 1972 it was finally returned to Japan as a result of years of friction between the Okinawans and the U.S. military.

Kumi odori was born out of the necessity of diplomatic acts. In 1372, King Satto of Chūzan consented to follow the tribute system with China and, as part of this system, Chinese envoys settled in Okinawa for approximately six months out of the year whenever the succession of a new king needed to be confirmed by the Chinese emperor (Foley 2). It was essential that these important visitors be entertained, so kumi odori was developed in 1719 by the odori bugyo, or minister of dance, Tamagusuku Chokun. Appointed to the position in 1715, his main responsibility was to commission entertainment for the lavish banquets held for the visiting emissaries. He had previously made five trips to Japan, stopping in both Satsuma and Edo (today's Tokyo). While there, he studied all the fine arts, gaining knowledge of kyogen, kabuki and Noh, which greatly influenced his work (Foley 3). He was inspired by the Chinese arts as well, and at this time Chinese literature, Confucianism, and even the sanshin, an instrument later adapted for kumi odori performances, had been absorbed into Okinawan culture (Foley 2). Kumi odori was staged for the first time at the Choyo banquet in spring of 1719: Shushin kaneiri (Possessed by Love, She Takes Possession of the Temple Bell) and Nido tekiuchi (The Children's Revenge), which were Chokun's first works, were performed by male aristocrats and remain a major part of the repertory to this day. With the fall of the Tokugawa shogunate and the rise of Meiji Rule in 1868, kumi odori was all but forgotten. The aristocrats who previously enjoyed the luxuries of time and money that allowed them to study court dance were now scarce in number but, through a few notable figures, it was passed down through the generations and performed for the general population. Even the common people now had the chance to enter the schools and become performers (Thornbury 233). After the American occupation of Okinawa came to an end and Okinawa was ceded back to Japan in 1972, there was a revival of sorts of all the indigenous art forms. The Japanese support of local Okinawan arts is a source of much debate. Although Okinawan culture was suppressed by the Japanese government during the war, but the On May 15, 1972 kumi odori was proclaimed a nationally important intangible cultural property, or kuni no juyo mukei bunkazai, under the Cultural Properties Protection Law, or Bunkazai Hogoho. Kumi odori was the fifth performing art to be selected as such, joining gagaku (ancient court music), bunraku (puppet theatre), no, and kabuki (other traditional Japanese dances) as corporate entities. After its inception, gidayu bushi, tokiwazu bushi, itchu bushi, kato bushi, miyazono bushi, and ogie bushi- all musical or narrative arts- would join them in this esteemed category (Thornbury 233–234). After a decade of petitioning for an arts complex to house the prefecture's native arts, the National Theatre Okinawa was built in Urasoe-shi, near the city of Naha in 2004. The reasons for this are not entirely clear, but despite government funding shortages, the officials in Tokyo agreed to support the project. Not only does the theatre attach importance to the city of Okinawa, but it is also a tourist attraction, which gives a more rational basis for their support (Thornbury 243).

== Elements of style ==
Kumi odori is a mixture of dance styles that has its roots in Okinawan, Chinese, and Japanese methods. In addition to this, it incorporates qualities from religious dances, kami ashibi or chondara, and chants, umui, which were prevalent in villages of the past (Foley 2). A true conglomerate, it merges music, song, narrative, and dance all for a dramatic effect. Originally performed by completely male casts of aristocratic origin, today it is also performed by women who typically take on the roles of females or young males. In the past, casting was dependent greatly on body type, and smaller males would perform these parts. The movements of the kumi odori are very slow and deliberate. There are no shows of bravura nor are there any obvious feats of difficulty, rather the complexity of the steps lies in its restrained simplicity (Foley 6). Highly stylized, its characteristic gliding walk is said to be one of the hardest steps to master. In classical ballet, it is said that it is more difficult to truly master bourrees (tiny connected steps en pointe which travel across the floor) than it is to complete multiple pirouettes, although the latter may look more impressive, and the same notion applies here. Generally speaking, the easier a step may seem, the harder it is to perfect. There are three levels of odori (dance): realistic actions, emotional actions, and dances within a dance. The characteristic walk discussed earlier would be an example of a realistic action, meant to tell a story. The addition of dance steps to these actions would comprise the second level, and the inclusion of travel dances, or michiyuki, within the storyline would fulfill the third (Foley 7). This is common in many forms of dance, especially in the classical ballet. Often, the main storyline will be subverted by peasant dances or divertissements provided purely for the dance itself, rather than substantially promoting the storyline. Although kumi odori shows greats parallels to the no style of performance, there are also several characteristics that provide distinction between the two. Both feature sparse settings, eliminating the need for elaborate backdrops or scenery. Similar material, structure, and quality of performance echo in both. However, where no deals with Buddhist thought, kumi odori leans toward Confucianism, choosing to promote moderation rather than enlightenment. Where no performers would typically wear a mask, kumi odori performers express their characters through makeup and other means (Foley 3–4). Facial expressions are understated and emotion is displayed through the movements of the head or the cast of the eyes (Foley 7). The eyes always lead the head, and just as in classical ballet, the eyes arrive first and the rest of the body follows. Such careful attention to detail gives a refined and controlled action life, without which the art would cease to give the desired impression.

There are two qualities that define a good kumi odori performance: kan and konashi. Kan is similar to the idea of innate stage presence, something that cannot be learned. Konashi, on the other hand, is the culmination of the skills acquired through years of experience. All performers must have both characteristics in order for a performance to be deemed good. The idea of hin, or innate grace, is also important (Foley 11). This does not come immediately and can only be achieved after years of hard work and dedication. It is said that one cannot be a good performer of kumi odori, no or kabuki, until at least fifty, which is quite the opposite of the baby ballerinas favored by many in western dance. Perhaps most importantly, while no focuses on past events, the kumi odori style focuses on present action (Foley 4). Kabuki and no both lack the heavy emphasis on music that is so important to kumi odori.

== Music ==
Chokun used ryuka, the classical poetry of Okinawa, and classical music for his songs. Instruments typically included three stringed instruments: the sanshin (brought from China), the kutu, and the kucho; the hanso, a flute; and two drums, the odaiko and the kodaiko. The lyrics were usually sung by the sanshin players, who were the most important instrumental component, and songs were used to heighten the mood in intense situations. These songs were crucial to the performance, and often replaced dialogue much like in Broadway musicals (Foley 8). And as opposed to the spirited music of Okinawa's common folk, this music was formal and somewhat austere, projecting the idea of nobility through the music. Delivery is formal and full of metaphors just as in Japanese literature of the time. Two styles were applied: strong singing, or kyogin, which was reserved for powerful male roles, and soft singing, known as wagin or yuwajin, which was used for female or young male roles (Foley 8). Most of the important singing was done by the musicians. The musicians either sat onstage or stage left during the performances, or sat behind a drop since the stage was ordinarily an eighteen-foot platform, much like that of the no (Foley 9). When performed in the present day, the musicians will sit either stage left or in the wings, preserving the uncluttered look of the original, and at no time are there more than six actors on stage (Thornbury 231). It is said that the essence of the action holds the importance, rather than the action or peripheral elements themselves. Similarly, realistic props were avoided, and would rather symbolize ideas instead of being taken literally.

== Repertory ==
Although approximately sixty kumi odori pieces have been accounted for, Chokun remains the most influential figure. Not surprisingly, all of his pieces were related to no in some way, which is understandable given the success of kabuki theater's adaptation of the same. His presentations were roughly half an hour long, unlike the two-hour-and-forty-minute performances that would come later (Foley 3). These works are generally categorized into two groups by subject matter: domestic plays, called sewa mono and historical plays, or jidai mono. Jidai mono, or vendetta plays as they are often called (kataki-uchi mono) are frequently based on revenge, while love and filial devotion and piety are the main focus of the sewa mono (Foley 8). Shushin kaneiri remains the most important piece of kumi odori, and shares many similarities to the Dojoji legend told through many other types of theatre arts. “Chokun’s five pieces,” or Chokun no goban, are completed with the addition of three more pieces: Mekarushii (The Children Left Behind), Onna monogurui (The Grief-Crazed Woman), and Koko no maki (A Tale of Filial Piety) (Thornbury 232). Tasato Chochoku, who lived from 1703 to 1773, was another great figure who created enduring works like Manzai tekiuchi, which translates as “Vengeance Fulfilled.” His contributions mainly centered on the theme of revenge, which in turn dealt with loyalty and devotion, as well as the creation of some comedic pieces (Thornbury 232). Five new kumi odori were developed in 2001 by Oshiro Tatsuhiro, in the first major attempt to revamp the repertoire since 1976. 1976 marked the year Kin Ryosho, a renowned kumi odori performer and teacher finished his alteration of parts of previous works, something that is inevitable when an art form is passed from generation to generation. Kin Ryosho (金武良章, 1908–1993) taught kumi odori to both sexes at his studio in Naha. He was taught by his father, Kin Ryojin (1873–1936), a student of Amuru Pechin, who was a famous performer in the last ukwanshin in 1866. Noho Miyagi (宮城能鳳) is the other notable kumi odori performer and dancer of the twentieth century. After studying under Genzo Tamagusuku, he taught at the Okinawa Geino Daigaku (University of the Arts), providing his students with the skills necessary to perform and pass on this cultural treasure (Foley 237).

== Kumi odori today ==
The future of the kumi odori revival is up in the air, as the average performer is around the age of sixty, and it is difficult to raise interest when these professionals are already busy teaching and living their own lives (Thornbury 241). Most professionals belong to the Dento Kumi Odori Hozonkai, and women have surpassed men in number, and while numbers may be growing, the lack of dedication compared to the earlier years will begin to take a toll on the art form. Few people have the time or resources to fully devote their lives to the study of classical performing arts today. Along with this somewhat waning interest, leading figures in the Japanese dance world believe that kumi odori needs to adapt in order to remain relevant today. Miyagi Noho, famous performer and teacher, has stated that in order to survive, kumi odori will need an overhaul (Thornbury 241). This seems an extraordinary feat, as the repertory has not expanded much since the kingdom years, but it has been demonstrated time and again that dance needs to change to keep up with the talents of those pushing its boundaries and vice versa. When an art form becomes complacent, interest is lost, and the true artistic value starts to fade. Kin Ryosho, another important figure in the Japanese dance world has said “When something becomes too rigid, it is dead” (Foley 11). In order to faithfully represent Okinawan culture, it must develop and grow with the area while remaining true to its cultural identity.
