= Nagauta =

Music genre

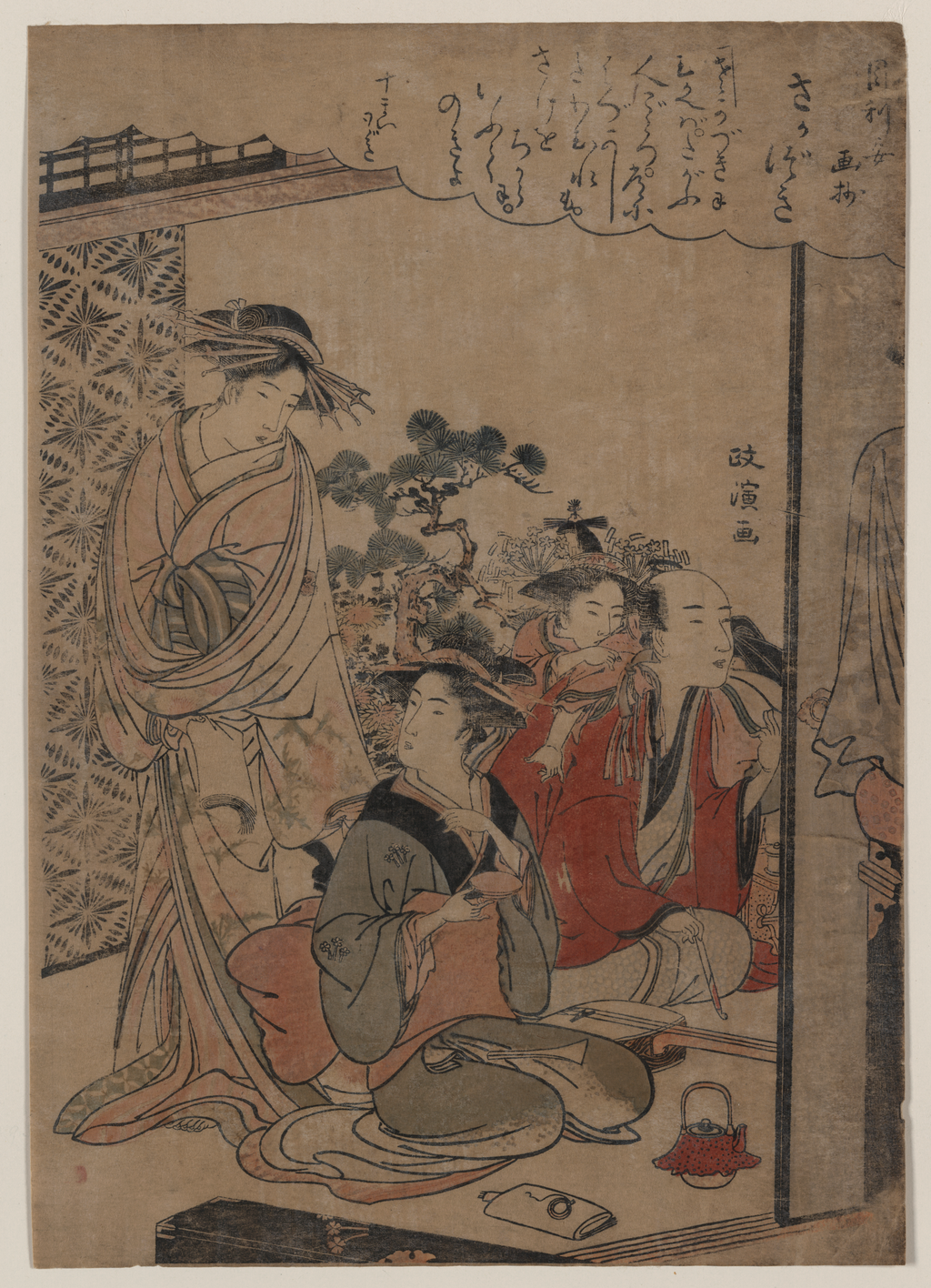
Sake Cup by Santō Kyōden, 1783–1784, a meriyasu

Nagauta (長唄, literally "long song") is a kind of traditional Japanese music played on the shamisen and used in kabuki theater, primarily to accompany dance and to provide reflective interludes.

== History ==
It is uncertain when the shamisen was first integrated into kabuki, but it was sometime during the 17th century; Malm argues that it was probably before 1650.

The first reference to nagauta as shamisen music appears in the second volume of Matsu no ha (1703).

By the 18th century, the shamisen had become an established instrument in kabuki, when the basic forms and classifications of nagauta crystallized as a combination of different styles stemming from the music popular during the Edo period. Meriyasu is considered a subset of nagauta.

Many of the "classic" nagauta repertoire was composed in the 19th century, which is the time of the best-known nagauta composers as well. Many pieces are based on Noh theater, partly due to the number of kabuki plays derived from Noh theater pieces, and many were revived during the 19th century. There is evidence of the influence of Japanese folk music on nagauta too.

During the 19th century, ozashiki nagauta (concert nagauta) developed as a style of nagauta composed for non-kabuki, non-dance performances in which a performer's skill was emphasized. Two classic compositions of ozashiki nagauta are "Azuma hakkei" (1818) and "Aki no irogusa" (1845).

In the 20th century, a number of composers have integrated Western elements into nagauta styles, including playing the shamisen at a faster tempo, in violin cadenza style, or by using larger ensembles to increase the volume. Nagauta is the basis of the Nagauta Symphony, a symphony in one movement composed in 1934 by composer Kosaku Yamada.
