= Jōruri (music) =

Narrative music of traditional Japanese puppet theater

Jōruri (浄瑠璃) is a form of traditional Japanese narrative music in which a tayū (太夫) sings to the accompaniment of a shamisen. Jōruri accompanies bunraku, traditional Japanese puppet theater. As a form of storytelling, jōruri emphasizes the lyrics and narration rather than the music itself.

== History ==
According to Asai Ryōi, the first performer to have ever employed the shamisen during his storytelling, instead of the biwa, was chanter Sawazumi. The story he narrated was "Jōruri Jū-ni-dan zōshi", one of the many existing versions of the Jōruri Monogatari, which tells the tale of the tragic love between Minamoto no Yoshitsune and Jōruri-hime. Following this event, every tale sung to the accompaniment of a shamisen became emblematic of the jōruri style.

== See also ==
- Bunraku
