= Sandwich man =

Sandwich man may refer to:

== Advertising ==
- The advertising practice of bumvertising
- A human billboard who wears a sandwich board

== Films ==
- The Sandwich Man (1966 film), a 1966 British comedy film
- The Sandwich Man (1983 film), a 1983 Taiwanese film

== People ==
- Sandwichman, Japanese comedy duo consisting of Mikio Date and Takeshi Tomizawa

== See also ==
- Sandwich (disambiguation)
