= Zashiki-warashi =

Japanese folklore spirit beings

Zashiki-warashi (座敷童子; or 座敷童, "parlor child"), sometimes also called zashiki bokko (座敷ぼっこ; "parlor boyo"), are spirit-like beings told about mostly in the Iwate Prefecture. They are said to be yokai that live in parlors or storage rooms, and that they perform pranks. It is believed that people who saw one would receive good fortune. There are also legends of how they would bring fortune to families. They are also known from Kunio Yanagita's Tōno Monogatari, Ishigami Mondō, and stories about them appear in the 17th and 18th chapters of the Tōno Monogatari and the 87th chapter titled "Zashiki-warashi" of the Tōno Monogatari Shūi. In the 17th chapter, it is written "families with whom this spirit dwells become prosperous" (kono kami no yadoritamafu ihe ha fūki jizai nari to ifu koto nari).

== Etymology ==
The name breaks down to zashiki (Japanese: 座敷), a sitting room or parlor, usually with tatami flooring, and warashi (Japanese: 童子), an archaic term for a child, used particularly in the northeast of Japan.

== Origins ==
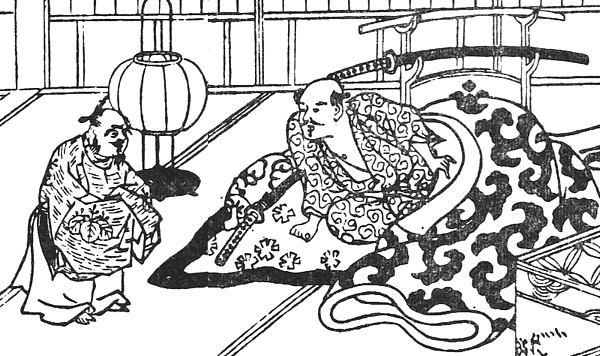
The money spirit from the "Hinpuku-ron" story in the Ugetsu Monogatari by Ueda Akinari

Kizen Sasaki noted that perhaps they are the spirits of children who were crushed to death and buried at the home. In the Tōhoku region, infanticide was called usugoro (臼殺, or "mortar kill"), and it is said that children who were killed this way to reduce the number of mouths to feed would be killed by being crushed by a stone mortar. Afterwards, it was customary to bury them in the dirt floor room (doma) or in the kitchen. It is said that on rainy days, the spirits of these children would walk around the homes outer edges, shaking and frightening the guests, which is similar to the actions of a zashiki-warashi. The notabariko and usu-tsuki warashi are viewed as lower ranking zashiki-warashi related to this belief, with the former said to peek in from the inner dirt floor (doma) room and crawling around, while the latter would use a mortar to make a sound.

In addition to this relation to infanticide, the fact that the zashiki-warashi are in both old homes and are often mentioned in relation to legends about how after a visiting Buddhist pilgrim from outside the village was killed, the family of the home came to ruin, it has been suggested that these zashiki-warashi are signs of the dark undersides of the village's community.

In the "Zashiki-warashi wo Mita Hitobito" (座敷わらしを見た人びと; "The People Who Saw Zashiki-Warashi") by the author Sadako Takahashi, there are also stories about zashiki-warashi that came about from a curse that resulted from carpenters and tatami makers that were unable to do their construction jobs in comfort, and it is said that there were rituals of taking a doll that had a bit of its wood peeled off and inserting it between the pillars and beams.

Another theory is that their true identity is that of a kappa, and there are stories of a zashiki-warashi being a kappa that lived in the depths who would rise up and go into a nearby home to do pranks, as well as stories of zashiki-warashi that were kappa that have settled into a home.

Concerning why zashiki-warashi look like children, seeing how in Buddhism there are gōhō-warashi (wrathful gods that protect Buddhism and take on the appearance of a child), there is the theory that they come from folk beliefs in how children connected gods and humans, as well as the theory that the appearance of a child embodies divinity.

In Kunio Yanagita's view, just as the gōhō-warashi were called forth from the heavens by high priests, the protective spirits of Buddhism and folk mikos are related to the faith in giving respect to the freshness of the spirits of young leaves, and this is related to the faith in the zashiki-warashi who became protective spirits of a home in order to will divinity to humans. In folkloristics, after Yanagita also, there has been debate on subjects such as the relation to Okunai-sama and the relation of children that come from another realm such as the Ryūgyū-warashi (dragon palace warashi).

Also, the folklorist Kazuhiko Komatsu views warashi (children) from the point of view of cultural anthropology, and regarding the question of the fortune within homes and the movement of wealth within a village, he notes that zashiki-warashi have almost all their characteristics in common with animal spirit possession such as izuna-tsukai ("weasel-using"). From an analysis of the supremacy and inferiority within the community of families with a spirit haunting them, he notes that zashiki-warashi have been used as a basis for explaining changes in fortunes within folk society, especially for old homes and families.

In Ueda Akinari's late Edo-period yomihon the Ugetsu Monogatari, in the story "Hinpuku-ron" (Theory of Wealth and Poverty), in Mutsu Province (now Aomori Prefecture), in a certain home of a warrior family, a spirit of money appears in the form of an old man going by the name of "Ōgon no Seirei" ("golden spirit") who said "I'm glad you treat money as something important to you, so I came to tell a story", but the doctor of letters Masamichi Abe suggests that perhaps this is an older, more prototypical type of zashiki-warashi.

== Concept ==
Reports have mostly been in the Iwate Prefecture, but there are also some scattered across the Aomori Prefecture, Miyagi Prefecture, Akita Prefecture and others in the Tōhoku region.

Generally, they are described as having a red face, hair that hangs down, and aged between three to fifteen years old. They have a bob haircut or very short cropped hair. Both males and females have been seen. The male ones are said to wear blackish clothes with a kasuri pattern and the females are said to wear a red waistcoat (chanchanko), kosode, and sometimes a furisode. In some cases, the gender cannot be identified by appearance. Further, there are also some legends telling of ones that look like a black beast, and others that look like a warrior.

They enjoy causing mischief. They will leave behind little footprints of ash or bleaching powder to prank other residents. At nighttime, they are said to make sounds like that of a revolving spinning wheel, and they would also make sounds in an inner room similar to a kagura performance. There are also tales told about how when someone in the family is sewing alone, there would be sounds similar to the rustling of papers or someone snorting, but when they searched for the source there would be no one there. Additionally, at night they are said to do pranks such as riding on top of guest room futons and turning over peoples pillows in order to prevent people from sleeping. If attempts are made to stop it, the zashiki-warashi would be too strong and powerful for anyone to affect its actions. Sometimes they also play with children.

In Iwate, there are legends of how the zashiki-warashi of a shrine at Hayachine would follow shrine visitors who came from afar back to where they came from. There are also legends of how the zashiki-warashi would then teach the nursery rhymes of Iwate to the children of those lands.

There are theories about how they cannot be seen by anyone other than members of the family or how they can only be seen by children but not adults. There are stories about how when adults counted children, there would be one more person than there was originally, but as adults do not understand what zashiki-warashi are, they would not know who the extra person is. Stories like these frequently appear as themes in literature.

== Relation to family prosperity ==
An example of a very characteristic folk belief is that families with a zashiki-warashi would prosper and families whose zashiki-warashi have gone away would decline. This aspect shows that zashiki-warashi are like gods of fortune or protective spirits that rule over a family's prosperity and decline.

In the Tōno Monogatari, there are many tales describing the effects a zashiki-warashi has on the families they live with. One tells about how a family was wiped out by foodborne illness after its zashiki-warashi left it and another tale about how in the Iide section of the village of Tsuchibuchi, Iwate Prefecture (now part of the city of Tōno), a wealthy family's zashiki-warashi was shot by a child with a bow and arrow causing it to leave the family, resulting in the family's fortunes decline. There is also the view that the way families would decline after a zashiki-warashi leaves it and the way families would prosper after a binbōgami leaves it are related.

There is the theory that a white zashiki-warashi is a sign of good things to come and the sight of a red one (with a red face, red clothes, and a red bucket in its hands) is a sign that a zashiki-warashi would leave the family leading to bad things to come. There are also examples where a family that saw a red-clothed one all died from foodborne illness.

== Customs ==
Zashiki-warashi are found in inner guest rooms (zashiki), and their existence is said to have an effect on the direction the family goes in. As such, there are some families that treat them hospitably and offer them meals every day. They are said to like azuki meshi, so there are families that offer some azuki meshi every day, and if it is not eaten, it is said to be an omen for the family's decline. Zashiki-warashi generally work the same way as having kitsune or having inugami, but the difference between them and zashiki-warashi is that a zashiki-warashi is never considered a nuisance. Rather, they are protected as gods, and a family that has a zashiki-warashi is usually treated with respect by others.

In the area around the city of Ninohe, there is a custom still practiced today of making up a room with desserts and toys left inside for a child who had died or was killed as an infant, and giving worship to this child. There is also a custom of making a room that a child would like in order to make a zashiki-warashi stay at the house in order to bring the family prosperity.

In Gonohe, Aomori Prefecture, there is a legend of how when a new house is built, a zashiki-warashi can be called into it by burying a golden ball under the floors.

According to the Tonō Monogatari, the house of a certain wealthy family in the town of Tsuchibuchi had a small space that was called the "Zatō room", and it is considered to be the room that would be used to await the Zatō (a kind of member of the builder's guild such as the tōdōza or members of related groups such as the Anma, moxibustion practitioners, and members of the biwa hōshi, among other organizations) every time a banquet was called. But the literary researcher Sukeyuki Miura surmises that perhaps this room was used to give worship to the god's protective spirit.

== Kinds ==
Zashiki-warashi have various regional names such as zashiki-warabe (座敷童), zashiki-warashi (座敷童衆), zashiki-bokko (座敷ぼっこ), okura-bokko (御蔵ボッコ), zashiki-kozō (座敷小僧), and karako-warashi. The name "zashiki-bokko" is used in the inland regions of Iwate, and this name was also used in the writings of Kenji Miyazawa.

There are also regions and legends where zashiki-warashi have rankings. In the Jippōan Yūreki Zakki (十方庵遊歴雑記), there are statements about zashiki-warashi seen in the area of Inase, Esashi, Iwate Prefecture (now Esashi District, Ōshū), and that zashiki-warashi in a home's dirt floor are called kometsuki-warashi, notabariko, usutsuriko, among other names. The white, most beautiful zashiki-warashi that is in the inner zashiki is called the chōpirako. Among these, there are some that have no influence on the family's fortunes and instead merely move around the house making noises.

There are also some that have arms that are long and thin like vines, which they use to beckon people as well as warn of disasters like floods and tsunami. These can be called hosode (細手, "thin arms") or hosode nagate (細手長手, "thin arms long arms"). There is a story telling of how "a poor man once threw firewood into the water, was invited into the dragon palace, and received as a gift an ugly-looking but fortune-bringing ryūkyū-warashi (dragon palace child)". There are also zashiki-warashi that stay in the dozō, and they are called kura-warashi or kura-bokko (child of the storehouse).

According to the essay "Zashiki-warashi no Hanashi" (ザシキワラシの話, "Stories about Zashiki-warashi") by the folklorist Kizen Sasaki, in a certain home in the aforementioned village of Tsuchibuchi, there is a kabukire-warashi (tree stump child) that lives in the "Mada no Ki" (meaning "Bodhi tree"). It is said to take on the appearance of a child and sneak into the family's zashiki to perform pranks on the family's daughter, as well as take on an appearance with a red face and play on walnut trees where the tree splits into three. It has also been interpreted to be a spirit of this Mada no Ki.

Despite there being many legends of the zashiki-warashi in the Tōhoku region, there are fewer in Akita Prefecture; this is said to be because Akita has the sankichi oni, so lower-class yōkai would not enter Akita.

== Legends after the war ==
To the people of Tōhoku, the zashiki-warashi was certainly not a legend that came around after the war, and tales of zashiki-warashi were told even in the times of Meiji, Shōwa, and beyond. According to Kunio Yanagita's Yōkai Dangi (妖怪談義), it is said that in the year 1910 or Meiji 43 around the month of July, in the village of Tsuchibuchi (now Tōno, Iwate Prefecture) in Kamihei District, Rikuchū, a zashiki-warashi appeared at a school that was visible only to the first year students and not to the older students and adults.

Certain ryokan that have continued to be managed since the Shōwa and Heisei periods, such as the Ryokufūsō at the Kindaichi Onsen in Iwate Prefecture, the Sugawara Bekkan, and the Warabe both in Tenjin village are known to be lodges where a zashiki-warashi dwells. There have been tales of guests who saw zashiki-warashi, heard footsteps, or were physically touched. However, unlike in the usual legends of zashiki-warashi, the one at Ryokufūsō is considered to be an ancestor that died from an illness and became a protective spirit.

Close to the Warabe, there is the Hayachine Shrine that was opened more than 1200 years ago, and it is said that since there have been festivals for offering prayers to zashiki-warashi ever since the establishment of the Warabe, the shrine's zashiki-warashi goes to the Warabe.

The zashiki-warashi of the Sugawara Bekkan was originally a god of fire of the Edo period that protected the proprietress's original home from fire, and it is said to have followed this proprietress when she married into the family of this establishment. There have also been tales about how guests to this ryokan have been successful in their marriage and jobs.

== Similar tales across Japan ==
Similar to the zashiki-warashi are the zashiki-bōzu of Kadotani, Tōtōmi Province (now Shizuoka Prefecture) and the akashaguma of Tokushima. Near one of the inner temples of the Kotohira-gū in Shikoku, it is said that at nighttime an "akashaguma" appears from a butsudan. "Akashaguma" refers to the fur of a bear that has been stained red, and it is said that a little childlike being wearing this would tickle the old woman owner of this house every night.

In the former Higashiyatsuhiro District in Yamanashi Prefecture, it is said that there is an okura-bōzu (お倉坊主, "warehouse bonze") that stays within the warehouse, and this is thought to be a type of zashiki-warashi.

In Ishikawa Prefecture, there is the makuragaeshi and it is said that if one sleeps in the zashiki of a certain house, especially if one wields two swords, has hair that stands up, wears western clothing, and puts on a haughty face, then one would get dragged into a neighboring room.

The zashiki-warashi of Shirotori, Ōkawa District, Kagawa Prefecture (now part of Higashikawa), is said to appear as a little girl who is called oshobo due to the small, slight (shobo-shobo in Japanese) way it hangs, and sometimes it is said to be invisible to the members of the house, while other times it is said to be visible only to the members of this house.

In addition, in Hokkaido there is the ainukaisei said to attack people in their homes while they sleep, and in the Okinawa Prefecture there is a yōkai called the akagantaa said to play pranks on people in their homes while they sleep, and sometimes these are interpreted to be the same kind of beings as zashiki-warashi.

The folklorist Shinobu Orikuchi enumerates examples such as the okunai-sama, the zashiki-bōzu, the akashaguma, the kijimuna of Okinawa, gaataro of Iki, etc., and sees in them examples of tales of a faithful spirit that came from another land to do work for a certain family whose disappearance would result in the decline of the family. He notes how zashiki-warashi do not descend into the garden and suggests that this is related to how performing arts in the past had a division between "garden", "zashiki", and "stage".

== Sightings ==
By the end of November 2015, a mirrored website offered video footage from a home video camera in Japan. It captured the image of what appears to be a girl wearing a kimono walking in the house. Her body is translucent and can walk through walls. It is believed that she was a zashiki-warashi.

== In popular culture ==
- In the animated series Mononoke, zashiki-warashi were represented by the spirits of babies that were forcefully aborted in a brothel and then stored in the walls so the mothers would be able to keep taking clients.
- In the animated series A Centaur's Life, zashiki-warashi was represented by a small child that played with Sue Mitama, the younger sister of Manami Mitama.
- In the manga and animated series Kimi ni Todoke, the main character, Sawako Kuronuma, is given the nickname “zashiki warashi” by her cousin because of her ominous physical appearance.
- In the video game Onmyōji, one of the first Shikigami you can meet is called Zashiki and represents a zashiki-warashi, being said to bring wealth and good fortune to her host.
- Zashiki-warashi is a prominent secondary character in the manga and anime series xxxHolic.
- In the 18th episode of Ninja Sentai Kakuranger, the Mushroom Child a zashiki-warashi whom the Kakurangers and the children befriend.
- In the 45th episode of Engine Sentai Go-onger, the Go-ongers and Go-on Wings meet a zashiki-warashi in a hotel room.
- In the manga Interviews with Monster Girls, a zashiki-warashi stays at the apartment of college student Yoko Takahashi, who is revealed to be a spirit medium and is the only one that can perceive her in any direct or indirect way. The spirit, a young girl, is named Zashiko.
- In the manga and its later anime adaptation Yuuna and the Haunted Hot Springs, the housekeeper of the inn the protagonist stays in, Ms. Nakai, is a Zashiki-warashi.
- In the video game and anime series Yo-Kai Watch, the zashiki-warashi is a common yokai of the Heartful tribe who specializes in healing abilities. It has an evolution named Zashiki-warashin. For the English release, they were named Gnomey and High Gnomey.
- In the 2012 Japanese family drama movie Home: Itoshi no Zashiki Warashi directed by Seiji Izumi, shows the spirit of a little 5 years old girl who is a Zashiki Warashi living in a rural house where the Takahashi family from Tokyo city moves into. The Takahashi family suffers from internal disputes within the family members and no happiness seems to be among them. The Zashiki Warashi enters into their lives and brings happiness for them, fixing all the broken bonds within the family and the spirit herself becoming a member of their family.
- Miyoi Okunoda, the protagonist of the official Touhou Project manga, Touhou Suichoka ~ Lotus Eaters, is a zashiki-warashi with the ability to manipulate memories.
- A Zashiki Warashi named Osoma can be seen in the anime Osomatsu-san, season two, chapter 18. The anime's protagonist plays Osoma as a Zashiki Warashi who scares people who visit the hut of her "mother" Choroe, telling them the story that she was supposedly killed by his own mother many years ago.
- In The House of the Lost on the Cape the zashiki-warashi play a crucial role in helping the three main characters restore hope to a region devastated by a tsunami.
- In Daemons of the Shadow Realm, the characters Kiri and Danji are revealed to be a pair of Zashiki Warashi.
