= Makuragaeshi =

Class of Japanese folklore characters

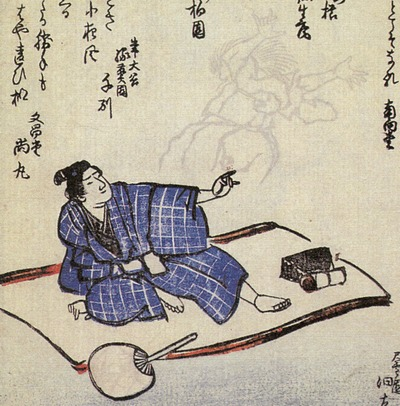
"Makuragaeshi" (枕返シ) from the Kyōka Hyaku Monogatari by Masasumi Ryūkansaijin

The makuragaeshi (枕返し or 反枕, “pillow flip”) is a kind of Japanese spirit or yōkai. They would come at night to one's pillow side and flip over the pillow. They are also considered to change which direction one's head or feet are facing. They are often found in many actual stories from the Edo Period to the modern period, and they are often said to appear as a small child or a bōzu, but there are no clear-cut accounts of how they look. In the Edo Period collection of yōkai pictures, the Gazu Hyakki Yagyō, they are depicted as a miniature Niō.

== Legends by area ==
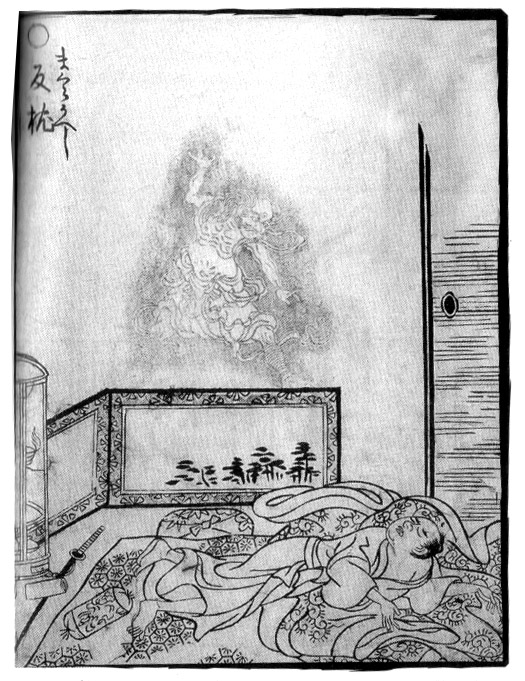
"Makuragaeshi" (反枕) from the Gazu Hyakki Yagyō by Sekien Toriyama

Besides being seen as a yōkai, it is also thought that people who died in a room would become that room's makuragaeshi. There are stories about wealthy travelers who come and take lodging (including zatō, Buddhist pilgrims, pharmacists, which differ by the area in which this is talked about, but all travelers that go to these lands) and get tricked by the owner of the house and have their money stolen, after which every night, the traveler's spirit would move the pillows of the people who lodged there, among other stories.

In the Tōhoku region, it is often said that makuragaeshi is a prank pulled by zashiki-warashi. The folklore researcher Kizen Sasaki notes in Tōno no Zashiki-warashi to Oshira-sama (遠野のザシキワラシとオシラサマ, The Zashiki-warashi and Oshira-sama of Tōno) that besides flipping pillows, they would also press on people's bodies as they sleep, lift up tatami mats, and left small footprints behind. This same book goes on and notes that in South Samuraihara, Kunohe District, Iwate Prefecture (now Kuji) and in Mukai, Miyako town, Shimohei District (now Miyako city), there is a mysterious pillar, and it is said that if one sleeps while facing this pillow, one would have a run in with makuragaeshi, making sleep very difficult.

In Omoto, Shimohei District, Iwate Prefecture, it is said that once in a certain house, a deceased person was put in a coffin and left in the residence, whereupon a fire burned the coffin and tatami mats, and despite changing all the tatami mats after, those who sleep on top of this tatami would have a run in with makuragaeshi. There are several theories on what is truly behind this makuragaeshi, such as being the work of a tanuki or monkey, among others.

In Higashiagatsuma, Agatsuma District, Gunma Prefecture, the makuragaeshi is said to be the deed of a cat turned into a kasha, and it is said that when people sleep facing east, it would turn them to face west.

There are also regions where a yōkai with the appearance of a child is called makura-kozō (枕小僧). In the Iwata District, Shizuoka Prefecture, the makura-kozō has a height of around 3 shaku (around 90 centimeters), and it is said to do pranks such as turn over the pillows of those who sleep alone.

== At temples ==
Some stories about running into a makuragaeshi in certain rooms and buildings can be seen in the temples of various lands in Japan.

At Daiō-ji in Ōtawara, Tochigi Prefecture, there is a hanging scroll with a ghost drawn on it called the "Makuragaeshi Ghost" (Makuragaeshi no Yūrei), and it is said that if one hangs this scroll, one's pillow will be found to have turned upon morning. This was drawn by an artist named Koryūen Ōkyo, but in one theory, there is a saying that it was actually drawn by his sick mother in bed, and the mother died right after the picture was finished, after which various paranormal events happened in relation to the picture, so it was placed in this temple as a memorial. At Ōkubo-ji in Sanuki, Kagawa Prefecture, if a makura-kozō stands near one's pillow while asleep, one could no longer move one's own body, so people are warned against sleeping there.

There are also examples of temple makuragaeshi that are said to be wonder workers that the temple itself is dedicated to as the principal object of worship. At Daichū-ji in Nishiyama field, Ōhira, Tochigi, Tochigi Prefecture, there is a room called the "Makuragaeshi Space" (makuragaeshi no ma). It is said that once, there was a traveler who took lodging in this room, and they slept with their feet facing the principal object of worship, but upon morning, their head was facing the principal object of worship, and this is counted as one of the seven mysteries of Daichū-ji. At a temple called Hakusan-ji at Koganeda, Mino Province (now Seki, Gifu Prefecture), there is a Kannon Bosatsu called "Makuragaeshi no Kannon" that is worshipped, and it is said that by being inside the temple, one would for some reason end up feeling sleepy, that one would doze off even if one is right in front of the Buddhist altar, but it is said that having a dream about having one's pillow flipped is proof that one's wish will be granted.

== Makuragaeshi that take lives ==
There are also examples of legends that not merely pull pranks, but also take people's lives.

In Kanazawa, Ishikawa Prefecture, it is said that at a certain residence, a makuragaeshi in the form of a beautiful woman would appear, but when the footwear (zōri) servant of that place was laughed at by this makuragaeshi in front of the residence, the servant fell unconscious right there and died just like that.

In Hidaka District, Wakayama Prefecture, it is said that there were 7 woodcutters cutting a large hinoki tree near the Komata river, and at night, while the 7 were sleeping, a tree spirit appeared and flipped their pillows, and all 7 died. There is a similar story in Wakayama where 8 woodcutters were trying to cut a momi tree, and they gave up midway because it couldn't be cut in one day, and the next day, the cut opening went back to how it was before. Thinking this strange, they kept watch over the tree at night, when they saw a wood spirit put woodchips in the cut. After this, the woodcutters would burn away all the scraps as they cut the tree, so they were able to finally finish cutting the tree. After doing so, one night, the wood spirit came to the woodcutters and flipped their pillows. However, one of the woodcutters was wholeheartedly chanting the Heart Sutra, so the wood spirit saw this one as devout, and went back without turning over this woodcutter's pillow. It is said that next morning, all of the other 7 died.

== The meaning of pillow flipping ==
It is thought that since ancient times, it was widely believed in Japan that the soul leaves the body while dreaming, and the soul cannot return to the body if the pillow is flipped during that time. In the historical tale Ōkagami written in the final years of the Heian period, there is a statement about how Fujiwara no Yoshitaka left a will that said that on his death, he would make sure to return to this world, so there will be no funeral by the usual customs, but despite this, a normal funeral was held with the pillow's position corrected to face north, so his wish to revive was not granted. The folklorist Akira Takeda notes that the pillow contains a person's living spirit or ikiryo, and to turn the pillow would mean to put that person closer to death.

The folklorist Miyata Noboru notes that in the past in Japan, dreaming was thought of as a way to go to another world, and in order to dream, people would kindle a sleep-inducing aroma into their hakomakura (箱枕, box pillow). Miyata remarks that because of this, the pillow is a special tool for moving to another world, basically a boundary to interactions with another dimension, and to have one's pillow flipped while sleeping, this "makura-gaeshi" (pillow-flipping) would be an abnormal state where all orderliness is turned upside down.

It is viewed that these folk beliefs about pillows was the origin of these makuragaeshi legends, and having a makuragaeshi (pillow-flipping) happen was feared as an abnormal state where one's body is cut off from one's soul, but as this belief gradually died out, the makuragaeshi (pillow-flipping) became seen as a mere prank.

== See also ==
- List of legendary creatures from Japan
