= The House of the Lost on the Cape =

2015 novel and 2021 film

- Novel volume cover

岬のマヨイガ (Misaki no Mayoiga)
- Genre: Fantasy
- Serial novel
- Written by: Sachiko Kashiwaba
- Illustrated by: Yukiko Saito
- Published by: Kodansha
- English publisher: NA: Restless Books
- Magazine: Iwate Nippo
- Original run: May 10, 2014 – July 4, 2015
- Volumes: 1
- Anime film
- Directed by: Shinya Kawatsura
- Produced by: Noriko Iwasaki; Taku Matsuo; Yoshinori Takeeda
- Written by: Reiko Yoshida
- Music by: Yuri Miyauchi
- Studio: David Production
- Licensed by: NA: Eleven Arts
- Released: August 27, 2021
- Runtime: 100 minutes

The House of the Lost on the Cape (Note: English title is taken from Fuji Creative Corporation.) (Japanese: 岬のマヨイガ, Hepburn: Misaki no Mayoiga) is a Japanese novel written by Sachiko Kashiwaba. It was initially serialized in the Iwate Nippo daily newspaper from May 10, 2014, to July 4, 2015. Kodansha later published the novel in print with cover art by Yukiko Saito on September 11, 2015. An anime film adaptation by David Production premiered in Japan on August 27, 2021. The anime is part of the "Zutto Ōen Project 2011 + 10...", marking the 10th anniversary of the 2011 Tōhoku earthquake and tsunami.

The English translation of the book was published by Restless Books in September 2023 and translated by award-winning translator Avery Fischer Udagawa. On the depiction of tragedy and hope within the story, Udagawa says, "I believe young people can all benefit from these portraits of hanging on when hope is in extremely short supply."

== Synopsis ==
Yui and Hiyori meet the elderly and kind Kiwa in a shelter following the devastating Tōhoku tsunami on March 11, 2011. Together, the three form a new family and move into a large, old house located on a cape. Kiwa gets in touch with kindly kappa, zashiki warashi, komainu, and ojizōsama (among others) and together the characters confront and defeat demons that feed on people's grief after the disaster.

== Characters ==
Yui (ユイ)
Voiced by: Mana Ashida (Japanese); Madeleine Morris (English)
A teenage runaway and a high school student who left her apartment due to her parents divorce. Her mother abandoned the family from there, and her abusive father scolds the latter for having poor grades and even blaming her for her mother's absence, which lead to her breaking point and left home. Yui visits the remains of a shinto shrine, and discovers Hiyori trying to move a huge tree branch off a Komainu statue. After succeeding, Yui gives her umbrella to Hiyori, before she follows her. They head to the emergency shelter and later taken into the care of Kiwa, a wise but kind old woman.
Hiyori (ひより)
Voiced by: Awano Sari (Japanese); Risa Mei (English)
An orphaned mute little girl who befriends Yui at an emergency shelter following the event of a destructive tsunami caused by an earthquake; due to the psychological trauma of losing her parents in a car accident around New Years Eve, she has not spoken a word since the tragedy. Shortly before the earthquake, she was taken in by relatives, until her relatives' house was destroyed during the earthquake, leading Hiyori to end up at the shelter until she and Yui were taken in by Kiwa.
Kiwa Yamana (山名 キワ, Yamana Kiwa)
Voiced by: Shinobu Otake (Japanese); Pam Dougherty (English)
Kiwa is a strange but wise and friendly elderly woman whom Yui and Hiyori meet at the shelter following the tsunami. When she approaches the girls, she takes pity on their situations and decides to take them in as her surrogate grandchildren where they move to an old house deep in the mountains overlooking the ocean.
Kappa of Toyosawagawa (豊沢川の河童, Toyosawagawa no Kappa)
Voiced by: Mikio Date
Kappa of Kitakamigawa (北上川の河童, Kitakamigawa no Kappa)
Voiced by: Takeshi Tomizawa
Kappa of Mabechigawa (馬淵川の河童, Mabechigawa no Kappa)
Voiced by: Shōhei Uno
Kappa of Kozuchigawa (小鎚川の河童, Kozuchigawa no Kappa)
Voiced by: Takuya Tasso
Zashiki-warashi (座敷童)
Voiced by: Sally Amaki

== Media ==
=== Book ===
No.	Japanese release date	Japanese ISBN
1	September 11, 2015	978-4-06-283235-9

=== Film ===
An anime film adaptation was announced on November 5, 2020. David Production produces the film, with direction by Shinya Kawatsura, screenplay written by Reiko Yoshida and music composed by Yuri Miyauchi. The film was released on August 27, 2021, receiving the Best Animation Film Award at the Mainichi Film Festival.

The closing theme is performed by Hitsujibungaku (羊文学) with the song Mayoiga from the album our hope

Eleven Arts announced at their panel at the A-Kon event on June 4, 2022, that they have licensed the film and will bring both an original Japanese version and a new English dub for the North American theatrical release in partnership with AX Cinema Nights on September 7.

== Reception ==
The novel won the 54th Noma Children's Literature Award in 2016. In 2024, the English translation won a Mildred L. Batchelder Award honor.
