= Sandwick =

Sandwick may refer to:

== Canada ==
- Sandwick, British Columbia, an unincorporated community in the Comox Valley Regional District, British Columbia

== England ==
- Sandwick, Cumbria, a hamlet on the shore of Ullswater lake, Cumbria

== Scotland ==
- Sandwick, Lewis, a village near Stornoway, Isle of Lewis, Outer Hebrides
- Sandwick, Orkney, a parish on the west coast of Mainland, Orkney
- Sandwick, Dunrossness, a settlement on the east coast of Mainland, Shetland
- Sandwick, Unst, in the south east of the island of Unst, Shetland
- Sandwick, Whalsay, a settlement on the island of Whalsay, Shetland
- North Sandwick, a settlement near the Burra Ness Broch archeological site on the island of Yell, Shetland
- West Sandwick, a settlement on the island of Yell, Shetland

== United States ==
- Sandwick Lake, a lake in Minnesota

== See also ==
- Sandvík, northernmost village of the island of Suðuroy, Faroe Islands, Denmark
- Sandvika, the administrative centre of the municipality of Bærum, Norway
- Sandwich (disambiguation)
- Sandwich Islands (disambiguation)
- Sandviken (disambiguation)
