= Kindaichi =

Kindaichi (Japanese: 金田一) is a surname and place name in Japan.

== Real people with the surname ==
- Kyōsuke Kindaichi (1882–1971): Linguist specializing in the Ainu language
- Haruhiko Kindaichi (1913–2004): Linguist and professor emeritus at Tokyo University of Foreign Studies
- Hideho Kindaichi (b. 1953): Linguist and critic, professor at Kyorin University

== Fictitious uses of the surname ==
- Kosuke Kindaichi in Seishi Yokomizo's Novel Series
- Hajime Kindaichi in The Kindaichi Case Files and the grandson of Kosuke Kindaichi
- Yutaro Kindaichi in Haikyuu

== Place with this name ==
- The city of Ninohe in Iwate Prefecture has a locality named Kindaichi ( or Kintaichi ).
- Kindaichi Onsen - onsen in Iwate Prefecture.

== See also ==
- Special:Prefixindex/Kindaichi
