= Mikio Date =

Japanese comedian

- 伊達 みきお
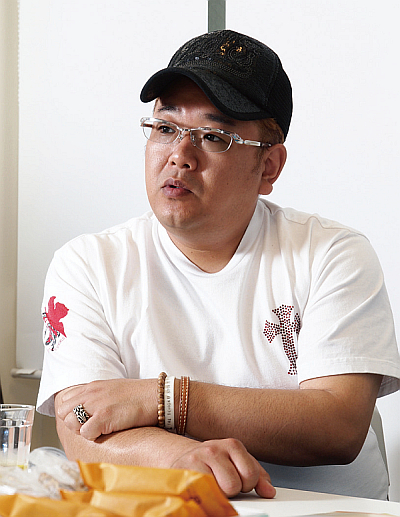
- Born: 5 September 1974 (age 52); Izumi-shi (now Izumi-ku, Sendai), Miyagi Prefecture, Japan
- Education: Sendai Commercial High School (now Sendai City Sendai Commercial High School)
- Spouse: Maiko Kumagai (m. 2009)
- Partner: Takeshi Tomizawa
- Children: 1
- Relatives: Sayuri Date (niece)

Comedy career
- Years active: 1998–

Mikio Date (伊達 みきお, 伊達 幹生, Date Mikio; DAH-tay; born 5 September 1974) is a Japanese comedian who performs tsukkomi of the double act Sandwichman. He has origins from the Ōedashi's Shoryū Date clan.

He was born from Izumi-shi (now Izumi-ku, Sendai), Miyagi Prefecture. He is represented with Grape Company. He has a height of 170 cm (5 ft 7 in), weighs 90 kilograms (200 lb), and his bust/weight/hip measurement is 110-100-109 cm.

== Biography ==
- He graduated from Sendai Municipal Yashida Junior High School and Sendai Commercial High School. In 1998, after forming "Oya Fukō" with classmate Takeshi Tomizawa of the rugby club, Tsutomu Hamada joined and they became Sandwichman. In September 2000, Hamada withdrew, but the unit name did not change. They had been renamed to "Viking" for a period of time around the end of 2003.
- Being qualified as a special counsellor for welfare equipment, he actually had work on welfare-related work before his double act formation.
- The Tōhoku earthquake and tsunami (the aftermath) occurred during the location of Sand no Bonyarinu TV at Kesennuma on 11 March 2011, which affected Takeshi Tomizawa, announcer Mari Nakui, and the programme staff. Although they took refuge at Azumi Mountain by the staff's instruction, a fire broke out after the town was flooded by the tsunami, and it became in a state where they could not go down the mountain. After that, they evacuated to a hotel lobby in Kesennuma. The next morning he reported on his blog that they were safe, he went to his parents' house and confirmed the safety of his flesh, and returned to Tokyo over ten hours.
- In his official blog on 12 March 2011 his post Everyone Please Do! Is an English translated sentence from the editorial board of the British newspaper The Independent which said that a "Japanese wife has read the emotional blog" editor-in-chief John Marin said that it was "also important to communicate the misery of the disaster, but also to send messages to encourage people to send messages, the role of the newspaper", with hints from Date's blog, "Ganbare, Japan!" and "Ganbare, Tōhoku" and the opportunity to make the cover of the Sunday version which treated Hinomaru. n addition, one sentence from Date's blog After our war, our grandpa and Ba-chan revived Japan. Reconstruction of Japan that was said to be a miracle in the world. Be sure to revive! Do not speak Japan! Do not speak Tōhoku! Is translated into English and introduced to The Independent's electronic version.
- On 12 January 2012, his eldest daughter was born.
- On 30 July 2016, his daughter was hospitalised with acute gastroenteritis and returned to the next day on 31 July.
- He is the uncle of voice actress Sayuri Date.

== Personal life ==
- He attended Ishinomaki-shi Watanabe Elementary School in Watanoha, Ishinomaki until second grade, then lived in Senrioka, Suita, Osaka for three years from elementary school for two years, and had lived in Kōriyama, Fukushima Prefecture for three years.
- In May 2009, he announced that he was engaged by Miyagi Prefecture's freelance announcer Maiko Kumagai in his own blog. They held a reception in Miyagi Prefecture on 11 July 2009.
- Tomizawa makes the basic netas of Sandwichman's conte and manzai, but the material that makes himself blurred such as "injured man" is made by Date (himself "ad lib").
- His respecting celebrities are Summers and Tomizawa, but as individually, which are Emiko Kaminuma and Tunnels, and also honour Jiro Hachimitsu of Tokyo Dynamite. He regards Jiro Hachimitsu is also a member of his group "Jirokai".
- He is nicknamed "Date-chan" (伊達ちゃん). On the other hand, because his true face is a child face of the unbelievable face, Shinsuke Shimada calls him "Onabe (おなべ) or "Onabe-chan" (おなべちゃん)., and Hiroyuki Miyasako touched him as "Chigusa Nagayo Ni" but he himself have to deny.
- He gifted the name to Chiharu Shiraki at the time as a member of Flat Five, Shura Oni, later Aa! Shiraki and gave him a disciple.
- A massage is one of his enjoyments when staying at a hotel. Because of his body shape and blonde hair, he is mistaken as a professional wrestler from eight percent of the masseur. When he is misunderstood, it is named a wrestling mask "Masked Shanghai".
- He is a geko (a person who cannot drink alcohol), and so is his partner Tomizawa. He is also a smoker.
- He wanted to become a police officer and took the Police Entrance Exam twice (and failed both).
- On 12 November 2017 in a broadcasting section of Kaminuma Takada no Kugizuke!, it was revealed that he has extreme hypertension with systolic period 211 and diastolic period 147, his doctor said "You can die in front of you", and also talked about being declared. Although he was taking anti-hypertensive drugs after that, he was still saying that the systolic period was around 160, and said that he did not smoke cigarettes as well.

=== Ancestry ===
He is part of Ōeda which is a family of Date Masamune's Date clan. During the Sendai Domain period, the Ōeda had four thousand stones as did the Watari District's Sakamoto Castle owner. (Note: Currently: Watari-gun, Yamamoto. The Ōeda's old fief part was devastated by the tsunami caused by the aftermath of the Tōhoku earthquake.) In the Meiji period, the 17th principal at the time Ōeda Dōtoku returned to Date. (Note: Current Ōeda main owner is Mikio's father's cousin Muneyuki Date.) In addition, in the Edo era Ōeda Michihide, one of Mikio's ancestors, is the Watari Date clan whose ancestor is Date Munezane, the ninth man of Masamune, and the Iwadeyama Date clan, whose ancestor is Date Muneyasu, the fourth son of Masamune because they made the daughter of Date Murayoshi who draws blood of both sides a main room, although it is a side stream, Mikio is also a descendant of Masamune. Initially it was said from his father "Since it is the descendant of the Date family, do not give your real name", but without obeying it, he gave his real name. Both Masamune and Mikio share the same birthday (5 September).

Paternity

Date Tomomune (Date clan founder) – (Approximate) – Date Hisamune – Rusu Kagemune – Ōeda Muneie – Zanerai – Munerai – Munesō – Munemuchi – Michirai – Michinin – Michiei – Michikyō – Date Muneryō (Ōeda Dōtoku) – Ryōji – Chūryō – Seiryō – Mikio

Relationship with Masamune

Date Masamune – Muneyasu – Munetoshi – Saneuji – Murashige – Murazane – Murayoshi – Daughter – Ōeda Michikyō – Date Muneryō (Ōeda Dōtoku) – Ryōji – Chūryō – Seiryō – Mikio

=== Hobbies ===
- His hobbies are the appreciation of rakugo, pachinko, and baseball (professional and high school). He is a fan of the Tohoku Rakuten Golden Eagles, and sometimes wears its uniform in sales. The manga he likes to read are the whole volume of Sakigake!! Otokojuku, Hakuryū Legend, Cooking Papa, Tasogare Ryūsei-gun, and Human Crossing.
- He likes eating, onsen touring, creative cuisine, and sauna. His favourite food is potato salad. He bring potato salad from a restaurant of a high school classmate which ran in Miyagi Prefecture.
- He likes to watch direct-to-video, and likes Riki Takeuchi and Show Aikawa for starring.
- He collects Date Masamune goods.
- His favourite singers are Kōji Kikkawa, Yashiki Takajin, and the Barbee Boys.
- He loves stuffed toys and he have named every stuffed animal he possesses. He carries them around in local places as well, and when he is living with Tomizawa, he talks to a stuffed animal when Tomizawa is not present. He himself claimed that he was "doing seriously because I want to be said to be cute like an idol," but from Tomizawa, he said that it "is more scary."
- He loves coffee milk and when he goes to a district for work, etc., he buys and drinks local coffee milk so that he could definitely say it in the rest area or convenience store. Moreover, this raises and shows the skill of coffee milk at the horsemanship competition at the Tohoku soul TV Even though it hits things here, and made one mistake with the type of coffee milk on the market.

== Filmography ==
=== TV dramas ===
- Unubore Keiji Episode 4 (30 Jul 2010, TBS) – as Tomokazu Hamana
- Yōgi-sha wa 8-ri no Ninki Geinin (18 Apr 2015, CX) – as Mikio Date
- Keishichō Sōsaikkachō Final Episode (23 Jun 2016, EX) as Masamune Adachi
- Gekokujō Juken Episode 9 (10 Mar 2017, TBS)

=== TV anime ===
- Gon (2012, TX) – as Nu, Washi

=== Other TV programmes ===
- Yoake no Marche (Jul 2009 – 30 Mar 2010, NTV)
- Senzai Ishoku (16 Jan – 27 Mar 2010, NTV)
- Joshi-ana no Batsu (16 Jul 2012 – 26 Mar 2014, TBS) – MC
- Margarine Ginkō (23 Oct 2014 –, Tokyo MX, BS11) – From the 10th meeting President (moderator)

=== Internet television ===
- Hitoshi Matsumoto presents Documental (2017, Amazon Prime Video) – Season 3 starring

=== Films ===
- Shuragayuku 12 (2000) – as Shunta Associate
- Giniro no Ame (2009) – as Electric shop worker Nogami
- Eine Kleine Nachtmusik (2018)
- The House of the Lost on the Cape (2021) – as Kappa of Toyosawagawa

=== Theatrical animation ===
- Doraemon: Nobita's Art World Tales (2025) – as King Arturia

=== Video works ===
- Kage no Kōshō Hito Naniwa Ninjō Retsuden (2009)
- Outrose (2011)

=== TV advertisements ===
- Sumitomo Life Refresh de 1Up-hen (Oct 2016) – Regular Man D-san

=== Dubbing ===
- Elemental (2023) – as Fern Grouchwood
