= Center versus periphery =

Linguistic hypothesis of local words "rippling" out

Simple illustration of Center versus Periphery theory over time

Center versus periphery (方言周圏論, Hōgen-Shūken-Ron, lit. "Surrounding-zones dialect theory") is a linguistic theory put forward by Japanese folklorist Yanagita Kunio explaining the usage of certain words in a language used in some regions while not in others. The theory may also explain the existence of other cultural features, or lack thereof, in differing regions. However, it was specifically created to address linguistic differences.

== Overview ==
In general, the theory states new words, often synonyms, are created in influential areas and cultural centers. These words gradually move outward to less culturally influential areas in a ripple pattern. Over time, the new words may travel a great distance. However, during their slow progression outwards from the cultural center, new words are also being created and gradually moving outwards. New words may not have the "momentum" necessary to propagate to all areas where the language is used. Typically, areas that are farthest away from a cultural center will possess only the oldest form of a word and no others, though the new words often still remain active in the cultural center where they were created, along with additional synonym variations.

== Origin ==
This theory was postulated by Yanagita Kunio to explain the existence of some words in cultural centers, such as the capital of Japan, during various stages of the nation's history, and the lack of those such words in non-cultural centers. It is not certain if his postulate was the first to describe such cultural patterns in general; or merely with respect to language.

== Example ==
Example word for the Center versus Periphery over time

One phenomenon the theory attempts to explain, for example, is the Japanese word for snail, particularly before the Meiji period. In Kyoto, the capital of Japan around the time of the Edo period, there were as many as four different words for snail: dedemushi (ででむし), maimai (まいまい), katatsumuri (かたつむり), and tsuburi (つぶり). In the areas outside the capital, not all of these words existed. As one traveled farther from the capital, the number of synonyms employed decreased. In the farthest reaches of Japan in the North and the South, typically only one word for "snail" was used. Coincidentally, the same single word existed in both places (in this case tsuburi (つぶり)), despite the great distance between the regions. Some linguists have taken this existence of various words in the farthest regions from cultural centers as an indication of the age of certain of these words.

== See also ==
- Dialects of Japanese
- Topolect
- Fangyan
- American English regional vocabulary
