= Akashi Kakuichi =

Japanese Buddhist monk

Akashi Kakuichi (明石 覚一; 1299 – 10 August 1371) also known as Akashi Kengyō (明石検校) was a Japanese Buddhist monk of the early Muromachi period of Japanese history, noted as the blind itinerant lute player (biwa hōshi) who gave the epic Heike Monogatari its present form.

== Life ==
Little is known about his early life, but Kakuichi may have originally been a monk of Enkyō-ji near Himeji in Harima Province and may have been a nephew of Ashikaga Takauji. After losing his sight in his 30s, he is said to have come to Kyoto and joined the Tōdōza, a biwa hōshi guild, performing versions of the Heike Monogatari as entertainment for members of the aristocracy. Kakuichi was a student of Jōichi (城一), the most famous Heike reciter in Kyoto, but soon surpassed his master and 1363 had the attained the highest rank (検校, Kengyō) within the guild. On his death, he was posthumous awarded the rank of Grand Master (総検校, Sōkengyō).

== Work ==
Kakuichi's version of the Heike Monogatari, known as the Kakuichi-bon, was developed over several decades beginning in the 1330s or 1340s, and was written down only a few months before his death as he recited it to his pupil Teiichi. The Tōdōza split over whether or not to accept Kakuichi's new version, with the Yasaka-ryu rejecting it, and the Ichikata-ryu accepting it. The Yasaka-ryu declined after the Onin War, leaving the tradition in the hands of the Ichikata-ryu. The Kakuichi-bon is currently the most popular version, and is the version used for most scholarly studies.
