= Sandwich (disambiguation) =

A sandwich is a food item typically made of two pieces of bread with layers of food between them.

Sandwich may also refer to:

== Places and jurisdictions ==
=== North America ===
- Sandwich, Illinois, U.S.
- Sandwich, Massachusetts, U.S., a town
  - Sandwich (CDP), Massachusetts, a village within the town
- Sandwich, New Hampshire, U.S.
  - Center Sandwich, New Hampshire, in the town of Sandwich
  - Sandwich Range, a range in the White Mountains
    - Sandwich Mountain, a mountain in the Sandwich Range
- Sandwich, Ontario, a historic town, now a neighbourhood of Windsor, Ontario, Canada
  - Sandwich, the former Roman Catholic Diocese of Sandwich (now of London, Ontario)
- Sandwich Islands, the former name for the Hawaiian Islands
  - Sandwich, the former Apostolic Prefecture of the Sandwich Islands

=== Elsewhere ===
- Sandwich, Kent, England, United Kingdom
  - Sandwich (UK Parliament constituency), former constituency
- Sandwich Island, former colonial name of Efate, now part of the Shefa Province, Republic of Vanuatu
- Sandwich Island, part of South Georgia and the South Sandwich Islands (British overseas territories)

== People ==
- Earl of Sandwich, a title held by multiple people

== Arts, entertainment, and media ==
=== Films ===
- Sandwich (2006 film), an Indian Hindi film
- Sandwich (2011 film), an Indian Malayalam film

=== Music ===
- Sandwich (band), Filipino rock band
- Sandwich (album), an album by the metal band Psychostick
- "Sandwiches" (song), a song by Detroit Grand Pubahs from the album Funk All Y'all

== Mathematics ==
- Ham sandwich theorem
- Huber–White standard error, also called the "sandwich standard error"
- Sandwich theorem

== Science ==
- Sandwich assay, a type of immunoassay
- Sandwich compounds in chemistry

== Other uses ==
- Sandwich (horse) (born 1928), Thoroughbred racehorse
- Sandwich (Urbanna, Virginia), U.S., a historic house
- Sandwich, a specific form of a threesome sex position
- HMS Sandwich, the name of six ships of the Royal Navy, and one planned one
- Sandwich generation, adults caring for their aging parents and their young children at the same time
- Sandwich printing, a photographic technique for combining multiple images into a single image
- Sandwich structured composite, a layered material

== See also ==
- Sandwich man (disambiguation)
- Sandwick (disambiguation)
