= Kunio Yanagita =

Japanese folklorist (1875–1962)

Kunio Yanagita 柳田 國男
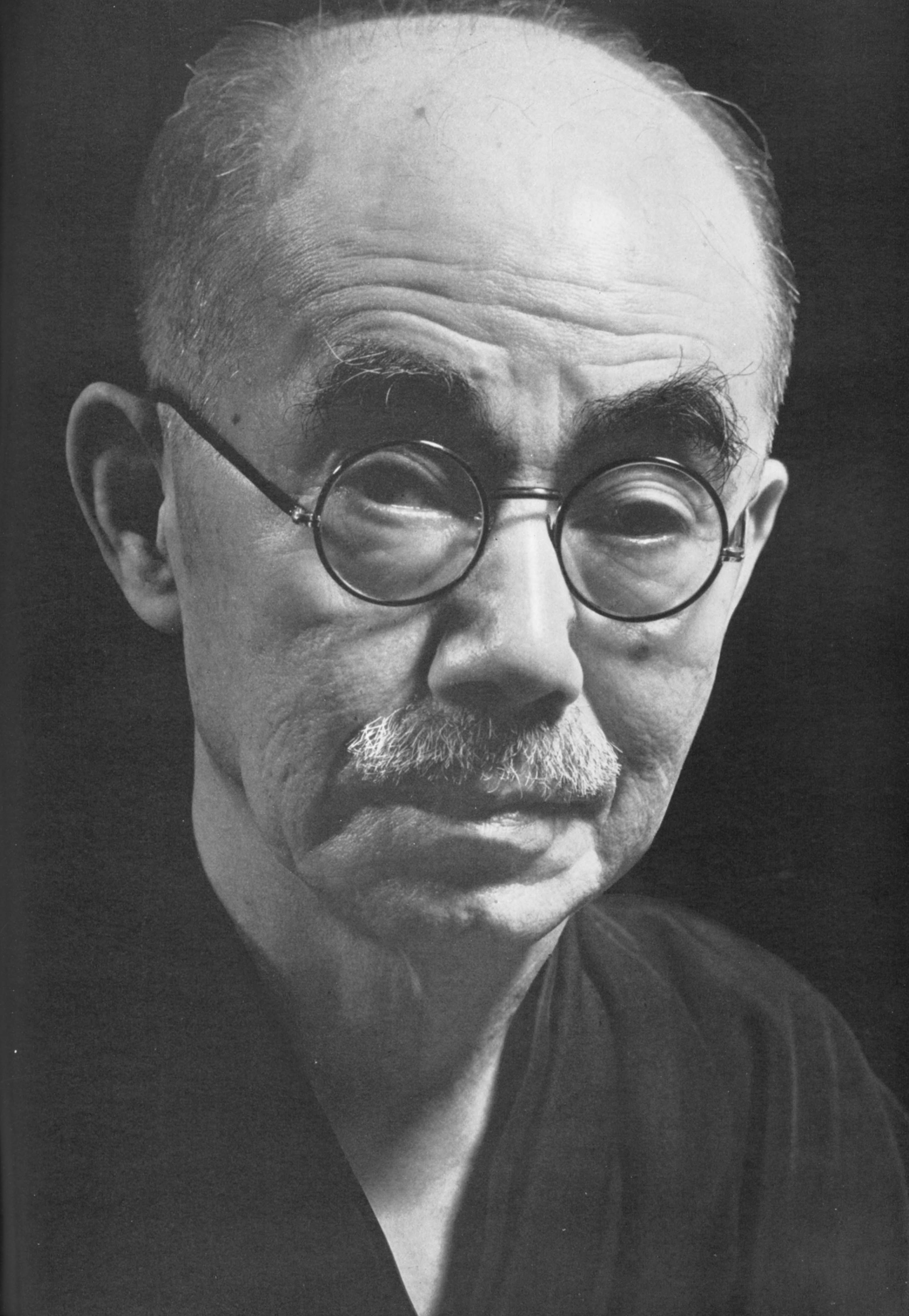
- Kunio Yanagita in 1951, photo by Ken Domon
- Born: Kunio Matsuoka; July 31, 1875; Fukusaki, Hyōgo Prefecture, Japan
- Died: August 8, 1962 (aged 87); Tokyo, Japan
- Occupations: Bureaucrat, Folklorist, Scholar, Writer
- Known for: Tōno Monogatari (遠野物語); Momotarō no Tanjō (桃太郎の誕生); Nihon mukashibanashi meii ("Japanese Folk Tales")
- Spouse: Taka Yanagita (1904)
- Parent: Yakusai Matsuoka (father) Naohei Yanagita (father-in-law)

Japanese name
- Kyūjitai: 栁田 國男
- Shinjitai: 柳田 国男
Transcriptions
- Romanization: Yanagita Kunio

Kunio Yanagita (Japanese: 柳田 國男, Hepburn: Yanagita Kunio; July 31, 1875 – August 8, 1962) was a Japanese author, scholar, ethnographer, and folklorist. He began his career as a bureaucrat, but developed an interest in rural Japan and its folk traditions. This led to a change in his career. His pursuit of this led to his eventual establishment of Japanese native folkloristics, or minzokugaku, as an academic field in Japan. As a result, he is often considered to be the father of modern Japanese folklore studies.

== Early life ==
Yanagita was born as the fifth child of the Matsuoka family in the town of Fukusaki, located in Hyōgo Prefecture. He was born with the name Kunio Matsuoka (or Matsuoka Kunio in the Japanese manner of naming), but was adopted into the family of a court justice named Naohei Yanagita. At the time, it was fairly common practice for families without a son to adopt a young boy or man into the family to inherit the family's property. This would often occur through marriage, with the adopting family marrying a daughter of the family off to their chosen heir as a way of binding him to the family. In this particular case, a match was made between the future folklorist and Naohei's daughter, Taka. The two were wed in 1901, and his name was changed to Kunio Yanagita.

Yanagita was known from a fairly young age for his interest in literature, particularly that of poetry. He also was a fan of Western literature. As he began to take an interest in folklore, Yanagita began reading ethnologies by Western anthropologists, such as Edward Burnett Tylor, shaping his later work.

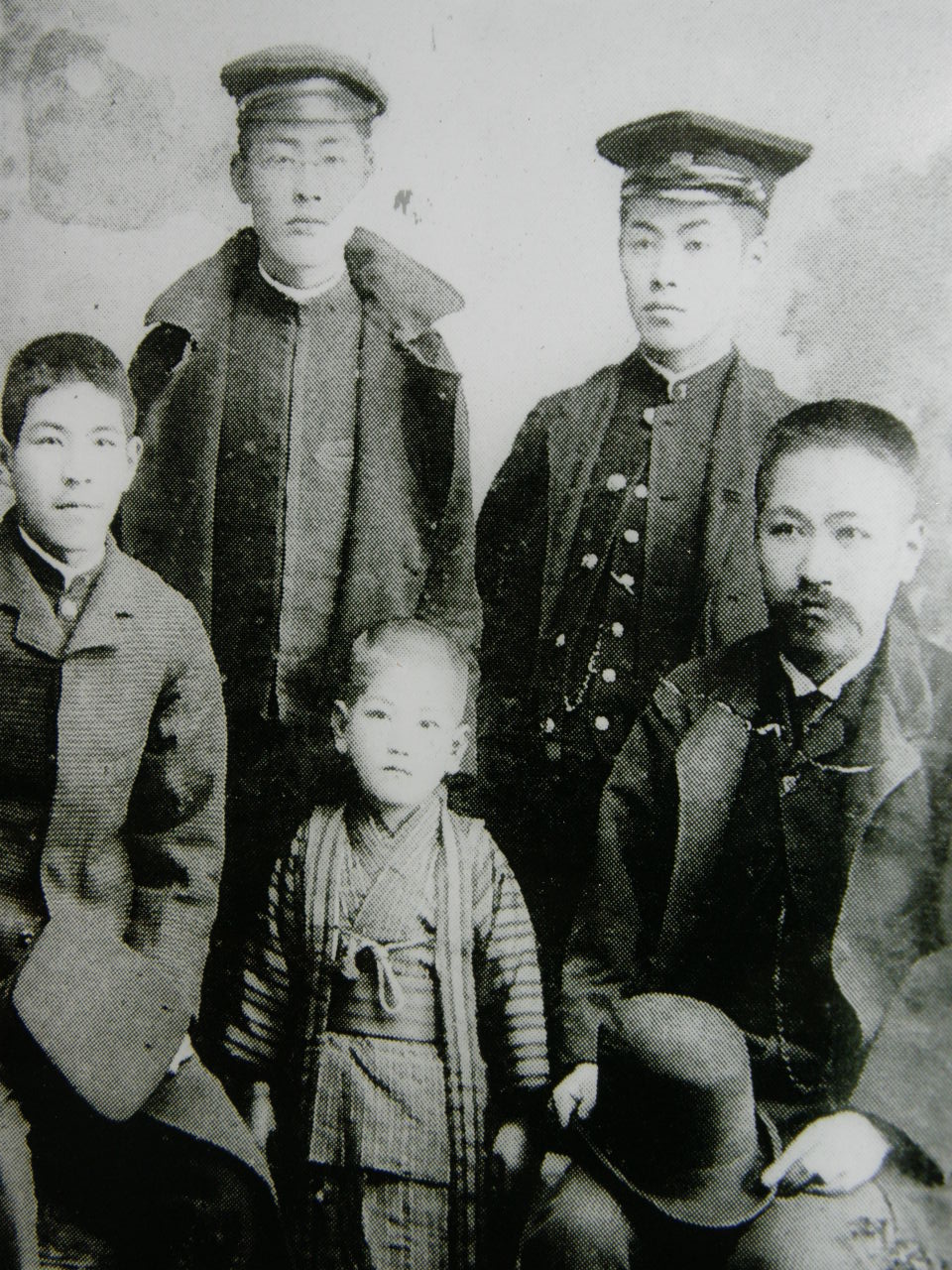
The Matsuoka brothers prior to Kunio's adoption by Yanagita

== Career ==
After graduating with a degree in law from Tokyo Imperial University, Yanagita began a career as a civil servant, working for the Department of Agricultural Administration of the Ministry of Agriculture and Commerce, that would last for about 20 years. While still a civic official, Yanagita was active in literature movements, having been so impacted by reading the works of Henrik Ibsen that he formed the Ipusen-kai, an Ibsen Society to study the plays of Ibsen in Japan. Over the course of his time in bureaucracy, duties, Yanagita traveled around the countrysides of Honshū, the mainland of Japan. During these business trips, Yanagita became increasingly focused on the affairs of rural villages and their agricultural economic policy.

As time passed, Yanagita began growing increasingly critical of the lack of concern for local autonomy allowed by the policies favored by his fellow civil servants. He gradually began to advocate in support of these groups, pushing for a shift in agricultural focus to center around cooperatives of small farmers rather than wealthy landlords. It is believed that the pushback he received against his values and ideas may have contributed to his change in careers and shift toward folklore studies.

Yanagita's departure from the Ministry of Agriculture and Commerce allowed him the opportunity to further investigate rural Japan. He began in-depth analysis, traveling around to record stories of local customs, practices, and beliefs. It was at this point that his literary friends, including writer Shimazaki Toson, began encouraging him to publish works based on oral traditions and customs of rural villages. His most famous example of this is a book known as The Legends of Tōno (1912). It is a compilation of short stories, practices, beliefs, and anecdotes from Tōno, a small, rural community surrounded by mountains in Iwate.

From here, Yanagita's work developed into the anthropological study of folklore that he is still known for today. He published many other works, including several with folklorist Kizen Sasaki, with whom he collaborated extensively.

Yanagita's focus on local traditions was part of a larger effort to insert the lives of commoners into narratives of Japanese history. He argued that historical narratives were typically dominated by events pertaining to rulers and high-ranking officials. Yanagita claimed that these narratives focused on elite-centered historical events and ignored the relative uneventfulness and repetition that characterized the lives of ordinary Japanese people across history. He emphasized the unique practices of different groups of common people, such as sanka or mountain dwellers, and island dwellers. He also focused primarily on what he saw as the three areas of folklore studies: material objects, oral transmission, and mental or emotional phenomenon. This third category, accessible only to those who share a deep understanding through similar experiences, is considered the main focus of folklore studies.

As a whole, Yanagita's work is highly memorable and genre-defining. He is one of the premiere folklorists of Japan, and he helped to create the field of minzokugaku itself, earning him the title of "father of modern Japanese folklore."

== Major works ==
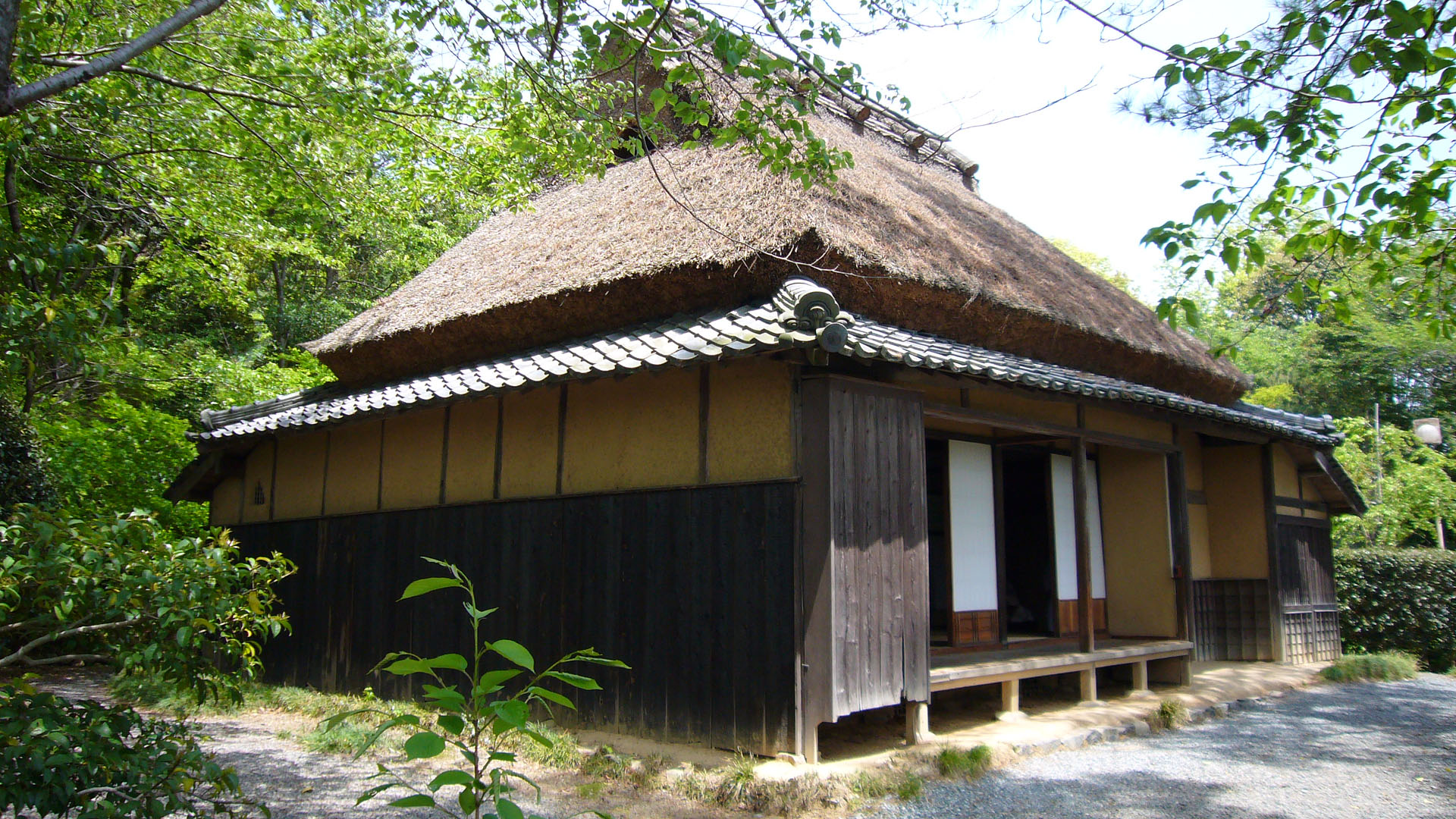
Yakusai Matsuoka's home

- Tōno Monogatari (遠野物語) – Yanagita's most famous work, Tōno Monogatari, is a record of folk legends, stories, and traditions (as opposed to a folk tale) gathered in Tōno, a city in Iwate Prefecture, Japan. Famous yōkai in the stories include kappa and zashiki-warashi . The work includes a number of stories featuring the hunter Sasaki Kahee (佐々木 嘉兵衛; 1815–1896), a local of Tōno.
- Kagyūkō (蝸牛考) – Yanagita revealed that the distribution of dialects for the word snail forms concentric circles on the Japanese archipelago (Center versus periphery theory of dialectical diffusion over time).
- Momotarō no Tanjō (桃太郎の誕生) – In this work, Yanagita provides analysis into themes of Japanese folklore and society. The name of the work is derived from the famous Japanese tale of Momotarō, as one of the examples he uses in his commentary on folktales as a form of reference material for understanding Japanese culture. In this work, he analyzes Momotarō to discuss some facets of Japanese society as a whole. His methodology in this has since been followed by many ethnologists and anthropologists.
- Kaijō no Michi (海上の道) – This piece, published only a year before Yanagita's death, records the history, culture, and folk tradition of the Okinawa islands of Japan. In his studies of Okinawa, Yanagita sought the origins of Japanese culture in the area, though many of his speculations were denied by later researchers. It is also said that his inspiration for this research came from picking up a palm nut borne by the Kuroshio Current when he was wandering on a beach in the cape of Irago Misaki, Aichi Prefecture.
- Kunio Guide to the Japanese Folk Tale – This is a selection of Japanese folktales and data from Yanagita Kunio's Nihon mukashi-banashi meii (日本昔話名彙), translated by Fanny Hagin Meyer.
- Nochi no Kari-kotoba no Ki (後狩詞記) – He privately published a work based on his travels around Kyūshū, focusing on the traditions and ways of life of a mountain community from Miyazaki Prefecture, including details about their hunting practices and the vocabulary used to discuss it. This work is considered one of the first works of Japanese folklore studies from Japan.

== See also ==
- Center versus periphery: Yanagita's theory about dialectal diffusion and vocabulary propagation over time
- Nihonjinron
- Yanagita･Matsuoka Family Memorial (Japanese)
