= Scenic State Park =

State park in Minnesota, United States

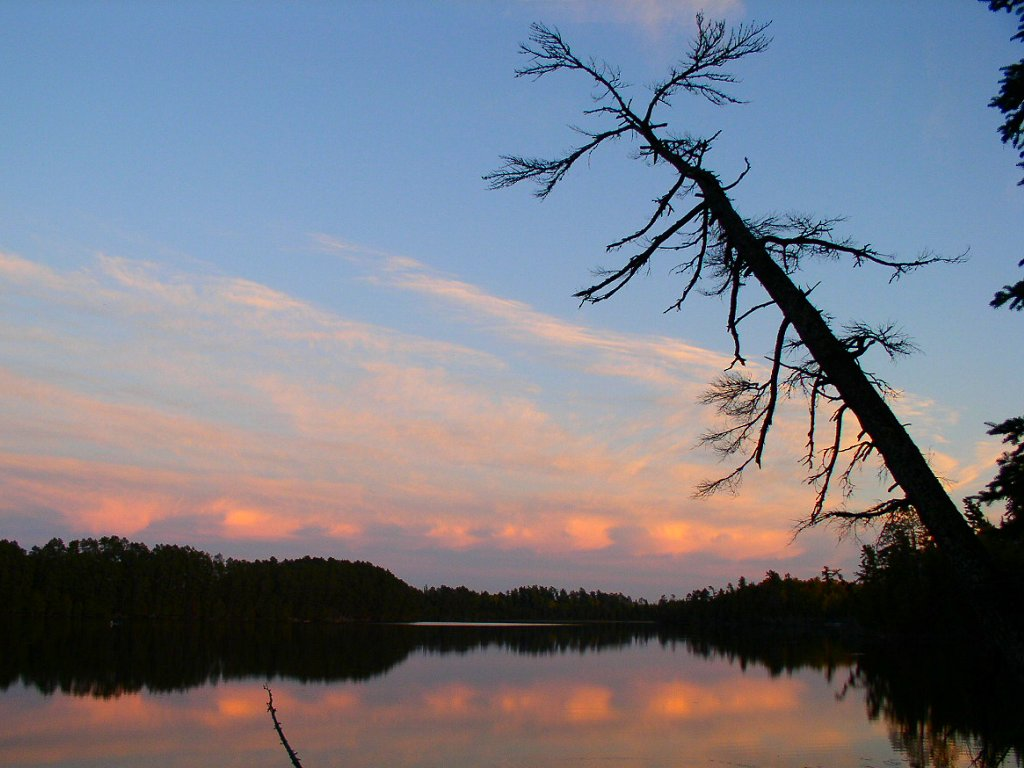
- Sunset at Coon Lake

- Location within Minnesota Location within the United States
- Location: Itasca, Minnesota, United States
- Coordinates: 47°42′56″N 93°33′46″W
- Area: 3,936 acres (15.93 km^{2})
- Elevation: 1,358 ft (414 m)
- Established: 1921
- Governing body: Minnesota Department of Natural Resources
- Website: Scenic State Park
- Scenic State Park CCC/WPA/Rustic Style Historic Resources
- U.S. National Register of Historic Places
- U.S. Historic district
- MPS: Minnesota State Park CCC/WPA/Rustic Style MPS
- NRHP reference No.: 89001670
- Added to NRHP: June 8, 1992
- Scenic State Park CCC/Rustic Style Service Yard
- U.S. National Register of Historic Places
- U.S. Historic district
- NRHP reference No.: 92000595
- Added to NRHP: June 8, 1992

Scenic State Park is a Minnesota state park near Bigfork in Itasca County. It encompasses 3,936 acres (1,593 ha) of virgin pine forests that surround Sandwick Lake and Coon Lake. It also includes portions of Lake of the Isles, Tell Lake, Cedar Lake, and Pine Lake. Established in 1921, the Ojibwe tribe had previously used the area for hunting. The park has places for camping, hiking, swimming, fishing, and canoeing.

== National Register of Historic Places ==
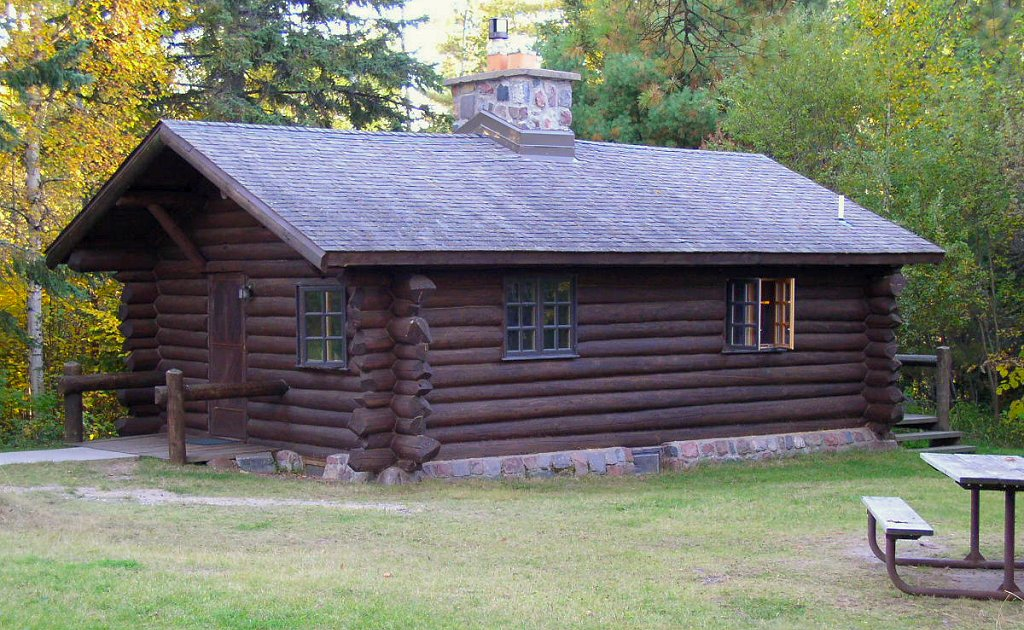
One of the cabins built by the Civilian Conservation Corps.

The park includes two historic districts that are listed on the National Register of Historic Places. The Scenic State Park CCC/Rustic Style Service Yard is located on the western shore of Sandwick Lake and it is composed of four buildings on a 2-acre (0.81 ha) site. They include the Equipment Building (1934), Ice and Wood House (1934), Custodian's Cabin (1935), and the Tool & Equipment Building (1935). The Scenic State Park CCC/WPA/Rustic Style Historic Resources district is composed of four buildings and two structures on 16 acres (6.5 ha) on the western shore of Coon Lake. They include the Shelter Pavilion (1934-1935), Comfort Station (1934-1935), Naturalist's Cabin (1935), Shelter & Latrine (1935), Water Tower (1935), and the Stone Steps (1935). The ten buildings and structures in the park were constructed by the Civilian Conservation Corps (CCC) in the Rustic style. They were designed by G. Iverson, Edward W. Barber, and the National Park Service (NPS). This development started in 1933 and it was the first CCC state park camp to begin operating within Minnesota. The buildings, of log construction, received considerable acclaim from the NPS. The landscape design was also prepared by the National Park Service and is one of the most thorough and extensive designs executed by their landscape architects.
