= Bumvertising =

Form of informal employment of homeless people

Bumvertising is a form of informal employment in which a homeless person is paid to display advertising.

The Bumvertising website publicizing this form of advertising was launched in August 2005 by Benjamin Rogovy, a 22-year-old entrepreneur who hired homeless men in the U.S. city of Seattle, Washington, to carry signs with the URL of his poker player match-up site.

In high traffic areas, such as intersections many beggars hold up a sign describing their plight but most people that pass by do not contribute to the beggar. To an advertiser this could be a valuable resource to reach a broader audience. The homeless person will usually carry the sign for a small amount of money or food for a rather low expense to the advertiser. The cost to get the beggar to hold the sign is much lower than paying minimum wage to a person wearing a sandwich board or costume.

Homeless advocates accuse Rogovy of exploiting the poor and take particular offense at the use of the word “bum” which is generally considered pejorative.

Rogovy was parodied during an interview by correspondent Dan Bakkedahl on the September 20, 2005 episode of The Daily Show. Bumvertising has also received non-comedic coverage in blogs, newspapers, and television shows from around the world. It was most recently discussed by a panel of marketing experts on The Gruen Transfer, a popular Australian marketing show.
