= Sandwichman =

Japanese comedy duo

- Sandouicchiman (サンドウィッチマン)
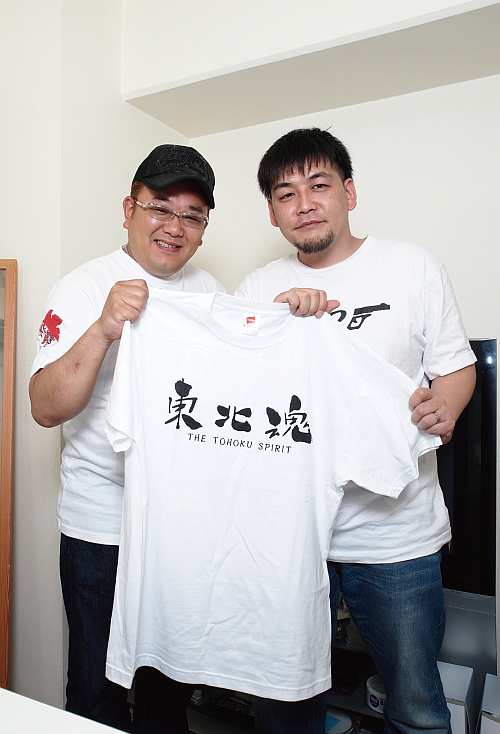
- Date (left) and Tomizawa (right) in 2012
- Other name: Sando (サンド)
- Employer(s): Horipro - Flatfive Co., Ltd - Grape Company

Comedy career
- Years active: September, 1998–present (formed in Miyagi Prefecture)
- Genres: Manzai, conte
- Members: Mikio Date (Tsukkomi); Takeshi Tomizawa (Boke)
- Website: Official Website

Notes
- Same year/generation as: Kirin; Total Tenboth; Hikaru Daita

Sandwichman (サンドウィッチマン) is a Japanese comedy duo (owarai kombi) and host consisting of Mikio Date and Takeshi Tomizawa from Grape Company. They are from Sendai, Miyagi Prefecture, Tōhoku region of Japan, and the duo was formed in September 1998. They were the champions of M-1 Grand Prix 2007 and the runners-up of King of Conte 2009.

== Member ==
Name	Role	Birth	Birth
Mikio Date	Tsukkomi	September 5, 1974 (age 52)	Sendai, Miyagi Prefecture
Takeshi Tomizawa	Boke, making up a story	April 30, 1974 (age 52)	Sendai, Miyagi Prefecture

Depending on the material they perform, Date sometimes ad-libs “bokeh” into the performance.

== History ==
=== Meeting and forming a duo ===
They met at the rugby football club of Sendai Commercial High School in Sendai, Miyagi Prefecture. It was a boys' school with a hierarchical club structure. Although the team was not considered competitive, they trained physically with the rugby team members and attempted to make senior members laugh in the club room.

After graduating from high school, Date went to work for a manufacturer of nursing care products, such as wheelchairs. Tomizawa, on the other hand, dreamed of becoming a comedian and formed a comedy duo with another person while working part-time. However, Tomizawa continued to solicit Date to become a comedian with him for five years, and they finally formed a duo and moved to Tokyo for dream in 1998.

=== M-1 Grand Prix ===
After moving to Tokyo, they named their duo name to "Oyafuko" and "Money and Fist" for a while, but the public did not recognize them, and they formed the trio "Sandwich Man" with Tsutomu Hamada, a colleague from their first agency, Horipro. The reason for the name was that the slender Hamada sandwiched between the larger Date and Tomizawa looked like a sandwich. After only one year, Hamada left the group, but they did not return to their original name and have been active together ever since.

For years, the two did not receive much recognition and continued to smolder with few jobs. With little money to spare, they lived together in a small apartment, managed to support themselves with part-time jobs. After a long period of underachievement, they began appearing on the Nippon TV popular comedy program “The God of Entertainment” around 2005. Then, on December 23, 2007, they won the M-1 Grand Prix and quickly became one of the most successful comedians.

Even after they became successful comedians, they continued to cherish their hometown of Sendai and Tōhoku region. Their first regular radio program was FM Izumi's Sandwichman's Radio Let Me Do It! broadcasting in Izumi Ward, Sendai City since July 2007. They have appeared on the show with no pay since that time, and they say that they still does so even today, after winning M-1 Grand Prix and other breakthroughs. they also say that even though they receive many offers for work in Tokyo, they give priority to work in Sendai.

=== Since 2011 Tōhoku earthquake and tsunami ===
When the March 11, 2011 Tōhoku earthquake and tsunami occurred, they were at a fishing port in Kesennuma, Miyagi Prefecture, filming a TV program. After the biggest tremor they had ever experienced, the local TV crew urged them to climb a nearby mountain, and they narrowly escaped tsunami.

Thinking of what they could do to help Tōhoku region, they opened a “Tōhoku Spirit Donation Account” soon after the quake to help the affected areas. Then, in a short period of about a month and a half, they collected donations amounting to about 300 million yen, which they were able to distribute and deliver to the six prefectures affected by the disaster by the end of May 2011. Since then, they have continued to actively engage in support activities, such as visiting evacuation centers with relief supplies, selling charity T-shirts, and holding charity live concerts. Sandwichman and his agency, Grape Company, Inc. are responsible for delivering donations directly to the prefectural governments of Miyagi Prefecture, Fukushima Prefecture, and Iwate Prefecture each year to support orphans and orphans of the disaster. They continued to provide ongoing support, and by March 2022, the cumulative donations collected totaled over 500 million yen.

10 years after the earthquake, They began to think of “something tangible to support with the relief money,” and in 2022, at the suggestion of Kesennuma, donated a Portable Restroom Trailers to the city of Kesennuma. This Portable Restroom Trailers was dispatched to Wajima, Ishikawa on the Noto Peninsula in January 2024 in the wake of the 2024 Noto earthquake, and was put to good use.

== Style of performance ==
Sandwichman were popular for their high quality manzai and comedy, and the standard phrase “I don't know what you're talking about" by Tomizawa became their staple. Their well-written scripts are their charm, but sometimes Date in particular makes Tomizawa laugh by ad-libbing something that is not in the script. This is made possible by their close rapport and deep trust, and the audience enjoys watching Tomizawa's reactions. Comedy critic Larry Toda says that their manzai and comedy acts seem to play on the so-called “beta” or predictable, but they exquisitely shift it a bit, and that is what makes them so interesting. He attributes this to the fact that they have been honing their manzai skills day in and day out with the M-1 Grand Prix competition as their goal.

Although they look a little scary, they are actually good friends, and their manzai and skits, the content is often humorous, such as their conversational misunderstandings, and their style is characterized by never hurting people. In traditional Japanese manzai, the style is often simply to hurt someone to get a laugh, and it was said that it is traditional for "tsukkomi" actor to hit "boke" actor on the head to get a laugh. Even for TV personalities, those who spoke out unreservedly with venomous tongue against the world gained popularity. In recent years, however, this style has come to be shunned.

Toyo Keizai Online wrote of them, “Sometimes comedians intentionally make fun of others to get a laugh, but the two Sandwichmen seldom do so. The fact that they are clean and do not do anything to hurt others is one of the reasons why they are loved by everyone.”

== Favorability ==
They are very popular among the public in Japan not only because of their manzai and comedy, but also because of their good friendship and their continuous support for the disaster-stricken areas in Tōhoku region since immediately after the disaster in 2011. In 2018, they were ranked first in the annual “Nikkei Entertainment” ranking of “Favorite Comedian”, beating Sanma Akashiya who had been number one for the previous 14 years. Since then, they have become regulars at the top of the favorability rankings and have been ranked number one in the “Talent Power Rankings” in 2019, 2020 and 2023. (Note: The “Talent Power Rankings” are based on surveys conducted once every three months by Architect Inc. on the “recognition (knowing faces and names)” and “interest (wanting to see, hear, and know)” of celebrities, and the “Talent Power Score” is calculated by multiplying the two sets of data and ranking them.) In the “Talent Image Survey” conducted twice a year by Video Research in January 2024, Sandwich Man ranked first for the 11th consecutive time.

On the other hand, however, they themselves sometimes find their high likability hard to deal with, and Date once expressed his worries on a talk show, saying, “People say it's a laugh that doesn't hurt people, but I've never made it with that in mind."

== Award ==
=== M-1 Grand Prix (results) ===
Year	Result	Entry number	Note
2002	Lost in the 1st round		
2003	Lost in the 1st round		
2004	Lost in the 2nd round	2314	
2005	Eliminated in semifinals	1801	
2006	Eliminated in semifinals	3884	
2007	Championship	4201	First place in the first round of losers' bracket

=== Other (awards) ===
- 2009 Tokyo Sports 9th Beat Takeshi Entertainment Award Japan Entertainment Grand Prize
- 2009 King of Conte 2nd place in the final
- 2020 58th Galaxy Award (Japan) Individual Award, Television Category.
- Talent Power Ranking 1st place 2019, 2020 (Nikkei Entertainment!)

== Ambassadorial career ==
- Miyagi Bond Ambassadors
- Honorary Member of Vegalta Sendai Citizens' Supporters' Association
- Tohoku Rakuten Golden Eagles Cheering Ambassador
- Tohoku Rakuten Golden Eagles 20th Anniversary Ambassador
- Kikufuku Goodwill Ambassador (Daifuku with fresh cream)
- Miyagi Rugby football Friendship Ambassador
- Matsushima, Miyagi Tourism Goodwill Ambassador
- Sendai Tourism Ambassador
- Date Uma (Note: Sendai residents are proud of and attached to the unique cuisine and food culture that is rooted in Sendai, the land of Date, and that even the gourmet Date Masamune could not help but admire.) PR Ambassador
- Date Hometown Ambassador

== Major appearances ==
=== TV variety show ===
==== Current programs ====
Regular and semi-regular

- Sando no Bonnyanu TV (April 22, 2008 - Tohoku Broadcasting Company) - MC
- Kaere Monday Mekke-tai! (October 2, 2016 - , TV Asahi) - MC
- Can you do it for 100,000 Yen? (100,000 yen de Dekirukana) (October 3, 2017 - , TV Asahi) - Host
- Sakagami Animal Kingdom (October 12, 2018 - , Fuji TV)
- The Breakthrough File (October 25, 2018 - , Nippon TV)
- Sandwichman and Ashida Mana's little Doctor (October 12, 2019 - , TV Asahi) - MC
- Rumor of a customer (October 25, 2019 - , Fuji TV) - MC
- Banana Sando (April 4, 2019, October 9, 2020, January 8, 2020, February 11, March 31, April 7, May 5, Regular: July 1 - , TBS Television (Japan)) - MC
- Comedy ability blade / Witness Variety Anta Watchman! (April 21, 2021 - , TV Asahi)

Irregular appearances

- Shōten (November 11, 2007 - Nippon TV) - Appears about once a year
- Ametalk! (TV Asahi)

Special programs

- New Year! Comedy Meijin Show (2011 - (every January 2), TV Tokyo) - MC
- This is the Spirit of Tohoku / Sando's This is the Spirit of Tohoku (January 29, 2012 - , Tohoku Broadcasting Company)
- God of Entourage|God of Entourage: The Greatest Laughs of All Time SP (April 7, 2012 - , Nippon TV) - catchphrase: “The pincer of volume” → “The outrage of the comedy world”.
- Hospital Radio (August 9, 2018 - , NHK General)
- Tsurubi x Sando series (Kansai TV, Fuji TV) - MC
  - Hello! Tsurube x Sando - Nippon no gaikokujin ga kitaeru (March 22, 2020)
  - Tsurube x Sando: Graph de Jinsei - Honto no You from my relatives' point of view - (August 30, 2020)
  - Tsurube x Sando, Tsurubei x Sando no tteokokuoki machinin (August 29, 2021)
  - Tsurube x Sando Happy News at the End of Summer (August 21, 2022)
  - Tsurube x Sand Summer Trip (August 20, 2023)
- Now in Contrast... (August 29, 2020 - , Fuji TV)
- Launch! Mirai Creator (January 16, 2021 - , TV Asahi) - MC
- Sandwichman's Aspiring Gachiman (December 24, 2022 and April 11, 2023, TBS Television (Japan)) - MC
- Sakaue Sand's Tohoku Gyakari Battabattaben - Let's see what the locals can do SP - (March 8, 2024, Fuji TV)

=== Streaming programs ===
- When Sando Laughs, Japan Laughs! (June 2016, hulu)
- Sandwichman's Journey of Improvised Comedy DX (March 31, 2017 - 2018, dTV (Lemino))
- Sandwichman Nagano's No. 1 Decision (December 3, 2018 - Fuji TV On Demand)

=== TV drama ===
- Hachi One Diver (Fuji TV) - First drama appearance
- Special drama Katsuo (December 18, 2013, NHK Sendai) - as Officer
- Dokuganryu Bride Road (July 29, 2015, NHK Sendai)
- Sando Knights ha Izakaya ha Hajimetamashita (January 6, 2023 - March 23, 2023, TV Tokyo, etc.) - Playing the role of the actor himself “Sando Knights” (January 6, 2023 - March 23, 2023, TV Tokyo, etc.)
- Sunday Prime “Kyotaro Nishimura Travel Mystery 71” (2020) - Mikio Tatsukawa (Date), Takeshi Tomiyama (Tomizawa)
- Serial TV Novel Welcome Back Monet (October 11, 2021, NHK Sogo) - as Fisherman A (Date), Fisherman B (Tomizawa)

=== Animation ===
- Gon (April 2, 2012 - March 25, 2013, TV Tokyo) - as Nu, Eagle, Wild Boar (only in episode 36) (Date), Leader (Tomizawa), live action in the mini program aired in part A from episode 37 to episode 40

=== Movies ===
- Silver Rain (2009) - played the roles of Electrician (Date) and Kojima (Tomizawa)
- Musicthon The Movie - Audrey's Bakuho 24 Hour Manifesto (2012) - Voice Support
- Uchimura Sammers The Movie Angel (2015)
- Eine Kleine Nachtmusik (September 20, 2019) - Second role for Winston Ono
- Manzai Kyokai The Movie: Onstage Discipline (March 1, 2024, Kadokawa/Mixed Zone/Chukyo Television Broadcasting/Miracle Voice) - friendship role

=== Animated feature film ===
- Soreike! Anpanman: Tobase! Handkerchief of Hope (2013) - played Sugoizou (Date), Zazizouzou (Tomizawa)
- Chieri to Cherry (2016) - played the role of a priest (Date), Daikoku-sama (Tomizawa)

=== Radio ===
==== Current programs ====
- Sandwichman's Radio Let Me Do It! (July 2007 - , fm Izumi)
- Sandwichman The Radio Show Saturday (October 2, 2021 - , Nippon Broadcasting System)

=== Commercials and advertisements (current) ===
- KY Corporation “Yamanakaya” (2013 - )
- Japan Agricultural Cooperatives Miyagi “Date Masamune” and “Miyagi Rice” (2016 - )
- Maruka Foods “Peyoung Sauce Yakisoba”, “Peyoung Noodle” (2017 - )
- Art Moving Center (2020 - )
- Takeda Juku (2020 - )
- Tama Home (2020 - )
- Recruit (company) “Car Sensor” (2021 - )
- TBC Group “MEN'S TBC” (November 3, 2021 - )[109]
- Hot Stuff (2022 - )
- JFE Holdings “Sasutetsu Nable! Series” (December 2022 - )
- The 77 Bank (May 12, 2023 - )

=== Music video ===
- "Hello Especially" by Sukima Switch (Tomizawa, 2013)
- "Otsukaresama desu! feat.Sandwichman" by Kis-My-Ft2 (2025)

== Videography ==
=== Solo live performance ===
Title	Subtitle	Release date	Standard part No.
Sandwichman Live 2007	Shinjuku Yotaro Aika	March 5, 2008 (old edition); August 27, 2010 (new edition)	CCRA-7022(old edition); AVBF-29577(new edition)
Sandwichman Live 2008	Shinjuku Yotaro March	December 10, 2008	AVBF-26999
Sandwichman Live 2009	Shinjuku Yotaro Kyousoukyoku	February 3, 2010	AVBF-29577
Sandwichman Live 2010	Shinjuku Yotaro Ondo	February 25, 2011	AVBF-29885
Sandwichman Live 2011	Shinjuku Yotaro Complete Arc	February 3, 2012	AVBF-49055
Sandwichman Live Tour2012		February 6, 2013	AVBF-49993
Sandwichman Live Tour 2013		February 5, 2014	AVBF-74096
Sandwichman Live Tour 2014		February 4, 2015	EYBF-10067
Sandwichman Live Tour 2015		March 2, 2016	EYBF-10536
Sandwichman Live Tour 2016		March 29, 2017	EYBF-10985
Sandwichman Live Tour 2017		April 27, 2018	GPCM001
Sandwichman Live Tour 2018		March 22, 2019	GPCM002
Sandwichman Live Tour 2019		March 25, 2020	GPCM003
Sandwichman Live Tour 2020–2021		March 30, 2022	GPCM004

=== M-1 Grand Prix ===
Title.	Subtitle	Release date	Standard part number	Remarks
M-1 Grand Prix 2005 Complete Version	A Christmas battle without a real winner! The Dawn of a New Era	April 26, 2006	YRBY-50040	Appeared in the Loser's Revival Round
M-1 Grand Prix 2006 Complete Version	A first in history! The Birth of a New Legend; The road to complete victory	March 30, 2007	YRBY-50074	Appeared in the Loser's Revival Round
M-1 Grand Prix 2007 Complete Edition	From the Loser to the Top; Triumphant Complete Record!	March 19, 2008	YRBY-90032	
M-1 Grand Prix the FINAL	Premium Collection; 2001-2010	March 9, 2011	YRBY-90369	
M-1 Grand Prix 2015 complete	Five Years of Laughter; Back from Hell...Again!	December 2, 2016	YRBN-91035	Tomizawa only (as a judge for the finals)
M-1 Grand Prix 2018	The young foreshadower was there	May 29, 2019	YRBN-91292	Tomizawa only (as a judge for the finals)
M-1 Grand Prix 2019	Impact of 681 points, the highest in history	June 3, 2020	YRBN-91384	Tomizawa only (as a judge for the finals)
M-1 Grand Prix 2020	The comedy never stops!	June 16, 2021	YRBN-91450	Tomizawa only (as a judge for the finals)
M-1 Grand Prix 2021	Era of great manzai Change your life	June 8, 2022	YRBN-91507	Tomizawa only (as a judge for the finals)

=== Sandwich Man's God of Entertainment ===
Title	Release date	Standard Part No.
Sandwich Man's God of Entertainment vol.1:God of Entertainment Best Selection	2008年9月19日	VPBF-13223
Sandwich Man's God of Entertainment vol.2:God of Entertainment Best Selection	2008年10月8日	VPBF-13224
Sandwich Man's God of Entertainment vol.3:God of Entertainment Best Selection	2010年5月26日	VPBF-13452
Sandwich Man's God of Entertainment vol.4:God of Entertainment Best Selection	2010年5月26日	VPBF-13453

==== Tōhoku Spirit TV ====
Title.	Subtitle	Release date	Standard part number
Tōhoku Spirit TV	The Tōhoku Spilit	7 March 2012	PCBG-51940
Tōhoku Spirit TV 2	The Tōhoku Spilit 2	5 December 2012	PCBP-52818
Tōhoku Spirit TV	Full stomach on a healthy trip to Tohoku, ed.	27 June 2014	AVBF-74464
Tōhoku Spirit TV	Transsexual version to mock the world	27 June 2014	AVBF-74463
Tōhoku Spirit TV	Band member who lost his guitar, ed.	27 June 2014	AVBF-74462
