= Kindaichi Onsen =

Thermal spring in Ninohe, Iwate, Japan

Coordinates: 40°19′19.7″N 141°18′45.8″E

Kindaichi Onsen (金田一温泉) or Kintaichi Onsen is an onsen in the city of Ninohe, Iwate Prefecture, in the Tōhoku region of northern Japan.

The onsen consists of seven establishments on the banks of the Mabechi River, and was developed from 1626 in the early Edo period for samurai in the service of the Nanbu clan of Morioka Domain. The alkaline spa was named a National Public Health Spa by the Ministry of the Environment in April 1994, and claims to be effective for neuralgia, back pain, hypertension, and rheumatism.

The Ryokufūsō establishment in Kindaichi was famed throughout Japan for being the home of a zashiki-warashi, but it burned to the ground in a fire on October 4, 2009.
