= Tōdōza =

14th century Japanese guild for blind men

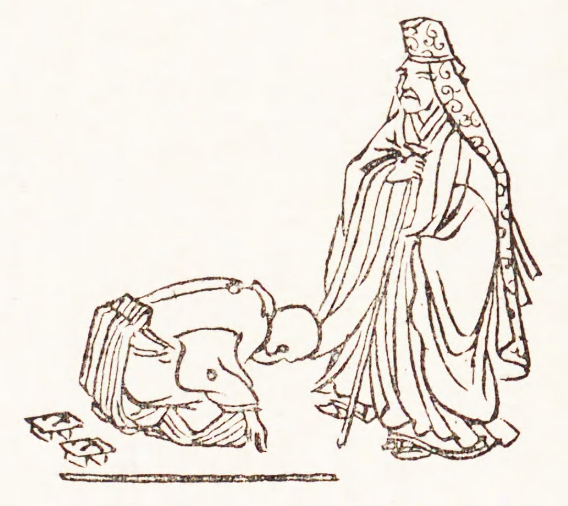
A blind man greets a formally dressed school inspector

The Tōdōza (当道座) was a Japanese guild for blind men, established in the 14th century in Kyoto. Founded by Akashi Kakuichi (明石覚一), the guild trained blind men as biwa hōshi or known as, "blind lute-playing narrative singers." Members were provided other professional roles, such as itinerant musicians, masseurs, and acupuncturists. The guild was organized hierarchically, enjoying official patronage from the Muromachi and Edo shogunates, and remained an important social and economic role for blind men in Japan until the abolishment during the Meiji restoration, in 1871.

== Origins and early history ==
Originally, blind men had made a living as Moso, or blind priests, who would recite Buddhist scriptures in small local guilds under the local Buddhist temple authority. During the medieval period, some Buddhists associated a person's blindness with karmic punishment. However, this negative connotation was slowly lost during the Tokugawa period. Overtime, these small local guilds turned into national guilds, moving from religious teachings to the performing arts.

The Tōdōza accepted only blind male members, making them an exception to the "hinin" class, which considered people who worked as tanners, prison guards, gatekeepers, and in many cases the disabled as non-human/dirty. Blind women seemed to have a separate organization, the Gozeza (瞽女座). Total membership was around 3,000; it is not known what proportion of the total blind population this represents. The number of guild members increased in 1534 from 445 men to 2,051 men in 1657.

There was additionally a further guild, the Mōsōza (盲僧座), similar to the Tōdōza but active mostly in the western regions of Japan.

== Guild hierarchy and membership ==
The organization was hierarchically structured with ranks that were divided into grades, and further into sub-grades. The higher the rank one had, the more privileges they would receive. The primary ranks were known as mōkan (盲官, blind officers), Kengyō (検校) (the highest), Bettō (別当), Kōtō (勾当), and Zatō (座頭). These ranks were further subdivided into a total of 73 distinct grades. Originally, the blind men were ranked on their artistic skill level, however during the 17th century as lute-playing became more outdated, the ranks lost skill representation, and the blind men relied more on economic privileges and benefits than their own skills and occupations.

To become a member of the Tōdōza, a blind man would start his career with the guild as an unranked novice (mukan) and as a disciple of a master that would teach him Heike music. He must rise through both the shoshin and uchikake grade before being approved as a Zatō. As his training would progress, he would gradually gain rank within the guilds hierarchy system based on professional achievements within the Heike musical performance. This title, Kengyō, reflects an honorary name given to blind musicians that had high skills.

However, education for the Tōdōza did not just include how to play instruments, but also storytelling and massage therapy, which were required skills in order to take occupations commonly regarded as jobs for blind people.

== Social status ==
Wealthy families would give alms to the blind who lived locally during special occasions such as child births, weddings, and funerals. During the 17th C. the Tōdōza allowed its members to collect these alms and would assign them specific territories where they could collect. This prevented blind men who were not a part of the guild from collecting money, whether earned or begged.

During the Edo Period, 1601-1868, the guild's purpose began changing from the arts to "socio-economic caste" and the men could no longer just perform the Kakuichi's libretto of the Tale of the Heike in order to make a living. During this time, performances such as ballet and opera began to become more popular.

== Music ==
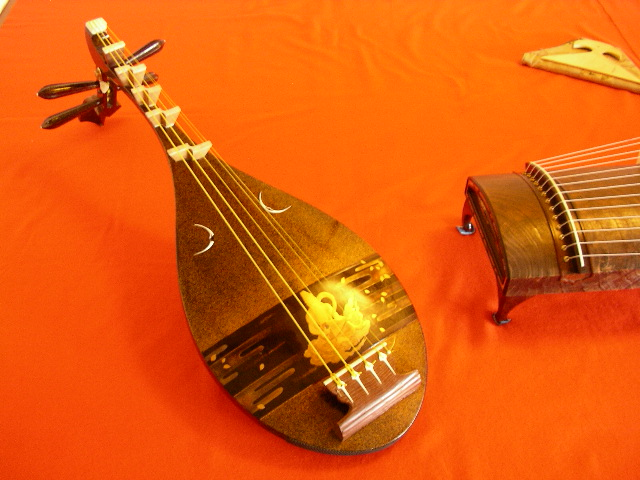
Traditional biwa

Originally, in front of live audiences, the blind men would narrate solo performances of verses of the Heike. The audience viewed their blindness as a sign of the sanctity of their musical performance, believing they could cross the realms between the living and dead. The Tōdōza members performed the Heike music on Biwa's, short-necked wooden lutes.

== Decline and abolition ==
The Tōdōza were formally abolished in 1871 after the fall of the Tokugawa shogunate during the early Meiji period. The Meiji government attempted to dismantle this "feudal-era" system.

== See also ==
- Zatoichi, a famous fictional Tōdōza masseur.
- Za (guilds), the Japanese guild system known as the za (座)
