= Sandwick Lake =

Lake in the state of Minnesota, United States

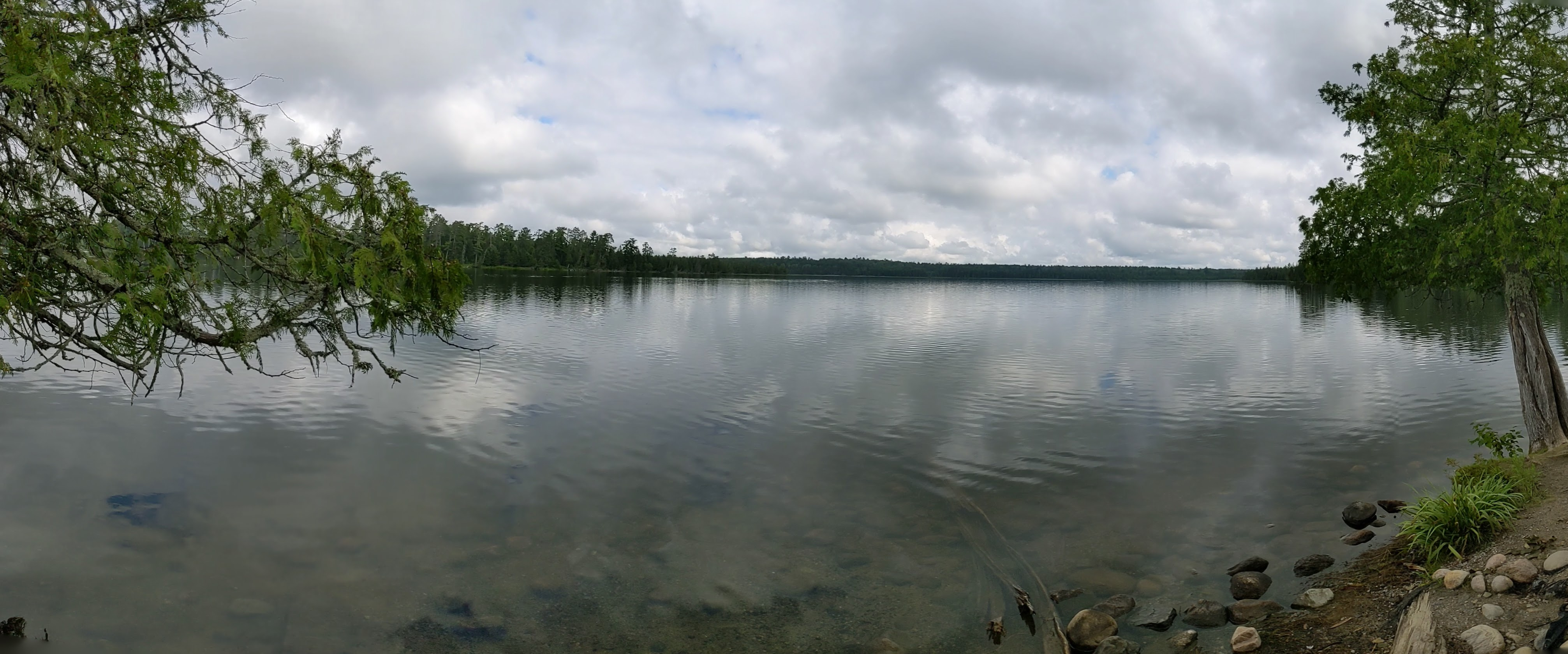

- Location within Minnesota
- Location: Itasca County, Minnesota
- Coordinates: 47°42.5′N 93°33.5′W
- Type: lake

Sandwick Lake is a lake in Itasca County, in the U.S. state of Minnesota. Zaiser Island, which was donated to Scenic State Park by the park's first superintendent and his family, sits on the lake.

Sandwick Lake was named for John A. Sandwick, an early settler.

== See also ==
- List of lakes in Minnesota
