= Iwate Nippo =

Japanese regional daily newspaper

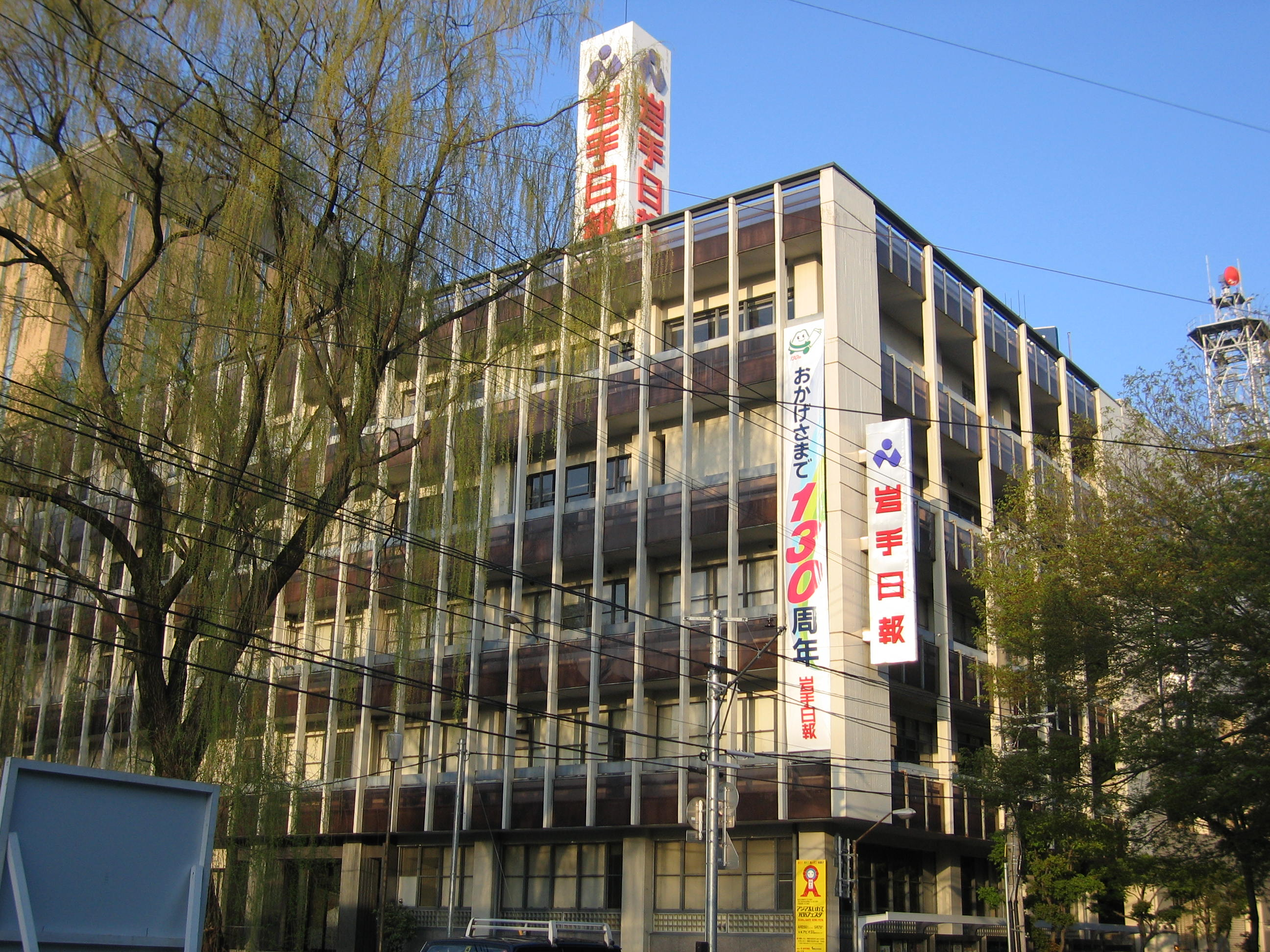
- Iwate Nippo HQ in Morioka
- Type: Daily newspaper
- Owner(s): Iwate Nippo Co., Ltd.
- Founded: 1877
- Language: Japanese
- Headquarters: Morioka
- Website: www.iwate-np.co.jp

Iwate Nippo (岩手日報, Iwate Nippō; literally Iwate Daily) is a Japanese regional daily newspaper published mainly in Iwate prefecture. The company is based in Morioka. The price of the newspaper is 4,000 yen per month inside Iwate prefecture, and 5,620 yen outside the prefecture.
