= Takeshi Tomizawa =

Japanese comedian and actor (born 1974)

- 富澤 岳史
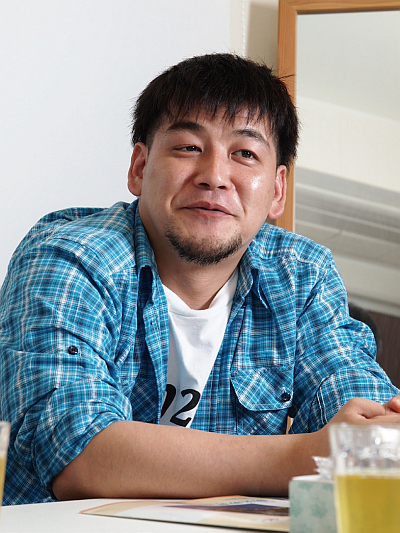
- Born: 30 April 1974 (age 52); Izumi-shi (now Izumi-ku, Sendai), Miyagi Prefecture, Japan
- Education: Sendai Commercial High School (now Sendai City Sendai Commercial High School)
- Partner: Mikio Date

Comedy career
- Years active: 1998–

Takeshi Tomizawa (富澤 たけし, Tomizawa Takeshi; born 30 April 1974) is a Japanese comedian and actor. He performs boke in the double act Sandwichman. (Note: In short conte he can also go to tsukkomi.)

He was born on 1974 in Itabashi, Tokyo. He belongs to Grape Company.

== Education ==
Tomizawa graduated from Sendai City Minamikodai Junior High School and Sendai Commercial High School. "Oyafukō" was formed in September 1998 with classmate Mikio Date of the rugby club. Tsutomu Hamada later joined afterwards and the group was renamed Sandwichman. In September 2000, Hamada withdrew, but the "Sandwichman" name did not change. The group was briefly renamed to "Viking" around the end of 2003.

== Biography ==
He moved to Moriyama-ku, Nagoya, Aichi Prefecture for six months and then moved to Chūō-ku, Niigata in Niigata Prefecture in 1980 and then grew up in Izumi-shi, Miyagi Prefecture (now Izumi-ku, Sendai) since 1984. This is due to his father's relocation.

He had been working as an amateur with the name "Yuyoyuyon" with another partner with the goal of belonging to the Yoshimoto Kogyo Sendai Office (Sendai Yoshimoto) founded in 1995, but before joining, he withdrew (there was a report that he belonged to Sendai Yoshimoto, but it was misinformation.) He appeared in the amateur section of "Sendai Yuyaji Theater" as "Yuyayuyon".

On 11 March 2011, the Tōhoku earthquake and tsunami occurred during the location of Sand no Bonyarinu TV at Kesennuma, which hit his partner Mikio Date and the programme staff. Although he took refuge at Azumi Mountain by the staff's instructions, a fire broke out after the town was flooded by the tsunami, and it became in a state where they could not go down the mountain. After that, they evacuated to a hotel lobby in Kesennuma. The next morning he reported on his blog that they were safe, and while he was headed for Tohoku Broadcasting, he was live on Hiroshi Kume Radio nandesukedo. After arriving at Tohoku Broadcasting, he went to his parents house and confirmed the safety of his relatives. It took him ten hours to return to Tokyo. Furthermore, the comment column of Tomizawa's blog is open as a communication bulletin board of safety information.

On 27 April 2011, his eldest son was born, while his second son was born on 9 June 2015.

== Personal life ==
His father is a branch manager of a major imported food company.

His nicknames are "Tomizawa-kun" (富澤君), "Tommy" (トミー, Tomī), "Otomi" (おとみ), "Kanashiki Monster" (哀しきモンスター, Kanashiki Monsutā), and "Ēsāku" (エーサーク)}.

He was born with difficulty opening his right eye. (Note: Because his eyelids do not open, surgery was performed when he was a baby) To this day, his vision in that eye remains poor, making it impossible for him to read.

He is sociable and he does not drink alcohol at all, but contrary to Date whom goes to drinking parties often, he does not go out at all.

The influenced laughter is from Snakeman show and Vocabula Tengoku, and thinks that his conte is "blood" for man, and his manzai are "meat" and "bone".

He has a habit of lying immediately because he has hernia. Date says that he goes to bed as soon as he enters the dressing room and lies down when eating.

In the neta, if he gets thrust, he tilts his neck or give a bow. He corrects himself even if he gets stuck in the blur of words mistakes.

He has favourite likes and dislikes in food, especially poor in seafood.

He e-mails with his wife all day at his loving wife's house. For some reason wife's name in mobile is not her nickname but her full name. In order to strike mobile phones on their neta, he also carries three chargers around.

It is a descent that can not be drunk at all, and he had vomited with two cups of kahlua and milk. He is a smoker, but sucks Neosider at home.

=== Hobbies, preferences ===
He became fond of cats because he kept a cat at his parents' home.

He cannot eat seafood such as crab and mackerel, but he likes chum salmon and Pacific saury. He likes melon soda and mapo doufu, but he is not good at strawberries

Among his favourite video games are some in the Pro Evolution Soccer series. He will occasionally play with his friend, Sukima Switch's Shintarō Tokita, while watching soccer games. He also collects figures, such as Devilman, films, such as Junji Inagawa's kaidans, performers books, and extraterrestrial intelligence magazines.

In the past, he wore a football representative of Argentina and local Vegalta Sendai uniforms. He is a uniform collector of Argentina national football team and Argentine domestic clubs.

He is a fan of Sendai 89ers of the Bj league, and the Tohoku Rakuten Golden Eagles, for which he has bought Rakuten home base season tickets.

He likes the Oakland Raiders of the NFL, and the Detroit Pistons of the NBA, and sometimes wear NBA uniforms in sales.

His favourite fashion brand is Cune, where the rabbits are printed on jeans.

He likes wearing a sun visor and a sukajan. He rarely wears a necktie because it is constricting, and wears substitute tie printed clothes; when wearing one in a conte, it is often loose. He wears wristbands because he sweats a lot.

=== Episodes ===
- Tomizawa is doing almost the neta making. His partner Date also said that he thought that Tomizawa is "really a genius, even if he quits being an entertainer, he can still eat regularly as a writer." Also, Terumoto Goto of Football Hour, who formed a combination with Tomizawa at Dream Match 2011 was acclaimed that Tomizawa made the story "perfect". In fact the Tomizawa×Goto pair has won the best couple award of that year.
- In sales, he actively speak while inserting tsukkomi, and communicates with the audience.
- In programme appearances he is good at reaction art like manga.
- I am good at drawing déformed illustrations.
- Date, says that being spoiled by being mischievous is everyday, even if he does a psychical experience (witnessing Date), he does "not care at all." It seems there is no inspiration in himself and the spirit can not be seen.
- He has a metallic allergy, if he wears metal accessories he will get rough skin.
- He is considerably more fertile around the second half of 2008.
- He dislikes being told that to "try hard" or "hang in there".
- He can make a vocal cord copy of the Japanese version of Mickey Mouse. But because his voice is so small, Date says that he does not hear him.
- When he took a certification photo, he created "a smile that is angry at the other step."
- His high school graduation album contains photographs that he glared at holding a bat with regent hair.
- Since co-starring in the film Giniro no Ame, he became friends with Yuko Oshima (AKB48).
- He began to grow chin beards from around 2012.
- He frequently said that children are not good. From the birth of his son, it is somewhat uncomfortable for a child until his son's age, but he says he does not know how to contact a child older than his son as ever.

== Filmography ==
=== TV dramas ===
- 81diver (3 May – 19 Jul 2008, CX) – as Yasuo Hidaka
- Soratobu Kōhō-shitsu (23 Jun 2013, TBS) – Final Episode guest, as Yamamoto Santōkūsa
- Ikitai Tasuketai (11 Mar 2014, NHK) – as Tomohiro
- Gomen ne Seishun! (12 Oct 2014, TBS) – as Tominaga
- Yūsha Yoshihiko to Michibika reshi Nana-ri (28 Oct 2016, TV Tokyo) – as thief theorist
- Quartet (17 Jan – 21 Mar 2017, TBS) – as Daijiro Tanimura
- Seirei no Moribito Kanashiki Hakai-shin (18 Mar 2017, NHK G) – as Ogon

=== Variety ===
- Joshi-ana no Batsu (16 Jul 2012 – 26 Mar 2014, TBS) – Navigator

=== TV anime ===
- Gon (2012) – as Leader (voice appearance)

=== Films ===
- Giniro no Ame (2009) – as Fishmonger Kojima
- The Princess and the Pilot (2011) – as Takeo Chijiwa (voice appearance)
- Eine Kleine Nachtmusik (2018)
- The House of the Lost on the Cape (2021) – as Kappa of Kitakamigawa

=== Theatrical animation ===
- Doraemon: Nobita's Art World Tales (2025) – as Critic

=== Advertisements ===
- Yukimi Daifuku (Lotte Ice Cream) – as Refrigerator (voice appearance)
- Nissan Note (Nissan)
- Sumitomo Life (Inshoku-ten de 1Up)-hen – as Store Owner T (2017)

=== Music videos ===
- Sukima Switch "Hello Especially - Wikipedia" (2013)

== Bibliography ==
=== Books ===
- Chotto Nani Kai ten no ka wakan naidesu……!! (1 Dec 2008, Kodansha)
