= Biwa hōshi =

Traveling performers in medieval Japan

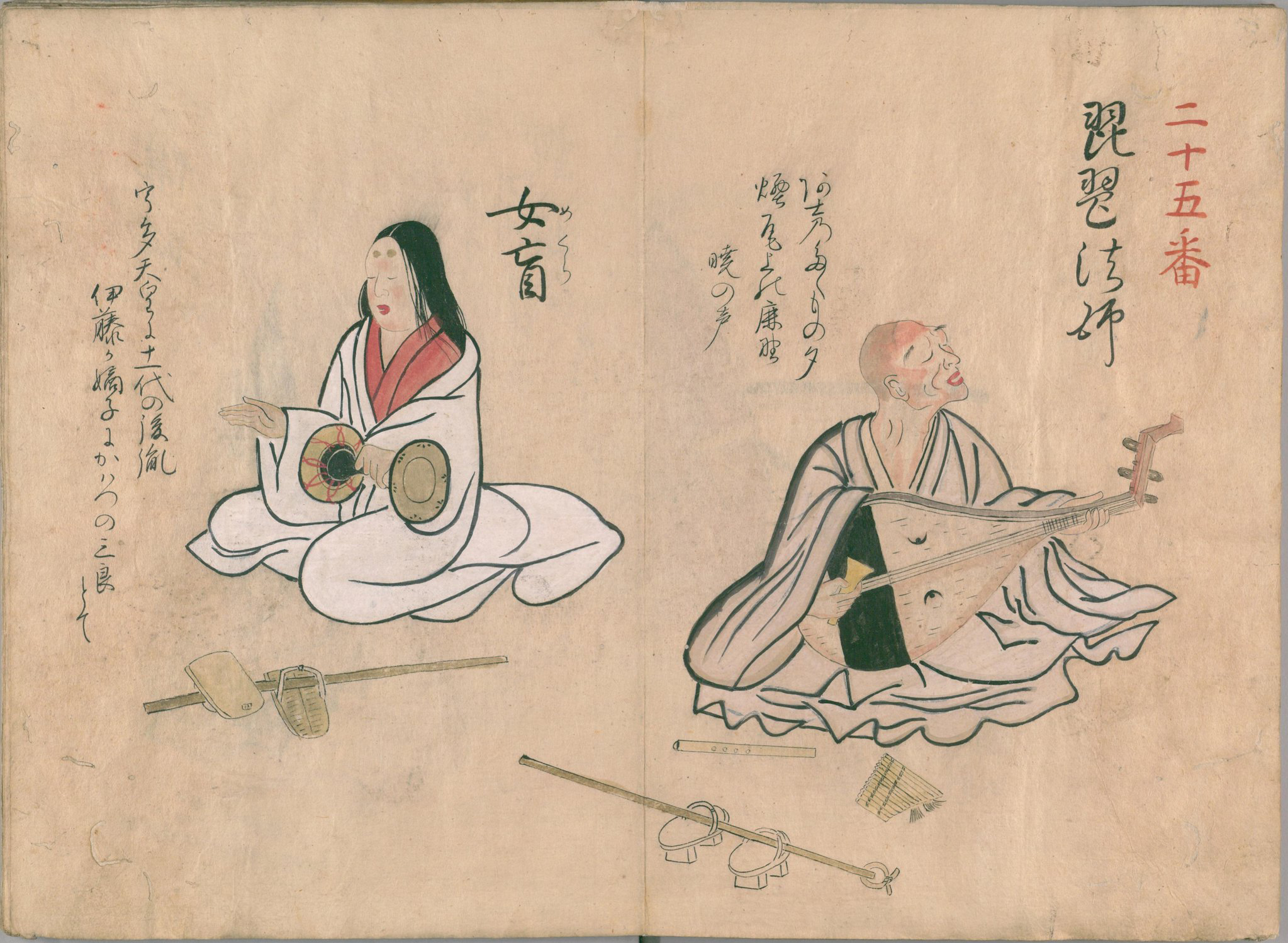
A biwa hōshi in a 1501 illustration

Biwa hōshi (琵琶法師), also known as "lute priests", were travelling performers in the era of Japanese history preceding the Meiji period. They earned their income by reciting vocal literature to the accompaniment of biwa music. Biwa hōshi were mostly blind, and adopted the shaved heads and robes common to Buddhist monks. The occupation likely had its origin in China and India, where blind Buddhist lay-priest performers were once common.

The musical style of the biwa hōshi is referred to as heikyoku (平曲), which literally means "heike music". Although these performers existed well before the events of the Genpei War, they eventually became famous for narrating tales about this war. Before biwa hōshi sang heikyoku, they were entertainers and ritual performers. They took on a broad range of roles, including poetry and song, plague prevention, and spiritual purification; it was probably because of their ritualistic duties that they became the caretakers of The Tale of the Heike (平家物語, Heike Monogatari).

The biwa hōshi are considered the first performers of the Tale of the Heike, which is one of Japan's most famous epics. It details battles between two powerful clans, the Minamoto and the Taira around the 12th century. The Taira (or Heike) were eventually annihilated by the Minamoto (sometimes called the Genji), who systematically killed every male descendant of the Taira. Religion in Japan at the time incorporated many native animistic (Shinto) beliefs into its Buddhist theological framework, leading many court nobles and religious leaders to worry about angry Taira spirits disrupting the peace. The great earthquake around 1185 CE contributed to this sentiment. Since their rituals included placating spirits and preventing plagues, heike music became a vehicle for placating lingering, resentful Heike spirits. Heikyoku and biwa hōshi became immensely popular for the next several hundred years.

== Etymology ==
Biwa hōshi (琵琶法師) literally means "lute priest". Hōshi (法師) is derived from buppō no kyōshi (仏法の教師), which translates as a teacher who explains Buddhist precepts. The two characters hō (法) and shi (師) mean "Buddhist doctrine" and "teacher" respectively. Hōshi referred to blind priests who played the heike-biwa to accompany their songs about legends, wars, histories, and mythologies. Eventually, hōshi referred to non-blind and blind performers and was also used as a suffix to a series of other types of people, such as dancing musicians (田楽法師, dengaku hōshi), Chinese-style entertainers (散楽法師, sarugaku hōshi), outcast artists (絵取り法師, edori hōshi), and men from Sanjō or men from temporary quarters (三条法師, Sanjō hōshi).

Biwa hōshi are referred to in Japanese iconography that dates back to the late Heian period (794–1185 CE). They are also referred to in the Shinsarugakuki, written by Fujiwara no Akihira (989–1066).

== History ==
A biwa hōshi with his audience from an emaki painted in the 14th century

=== Origins and proliferation ===
Shōbutsu, a Buddhist monk of the Tendai school, was, according to tradition, the first biwa hōshi to sing the Heike Monogatari, around the year 1220. Subsequently, two different factions of biwa hōshi were formed. These were the Ichikata school, founded by Akashi Kyoichi, and the Yasaka School, founded by Yasaka Kigen. Ranks were assigned to biwa hōshi on the basis of skill, the highest being kengyō (検校), followed by kōtō (勾当), bettō (別当) and zatō (座頭).

The proliferation of the Yasaka and Ichikata factions heightened with the contributions of Akashi Kakuichi (1300–1371). A noted biwa hōshi, Kakuichi's heikyoku narration is currently accepted as the definitive version of the heike. A documented reason for this is that Kakuichi was largely responsible for forming the Ichikata guild. This preceded the formation of the Tōdō (当道), a self-governing guild of biwa hōshi. The Tōdō received income in two ways: patronage from the Kyoto aristocracy and military, and its monopoly over the teaching and transmission of heikyoku. To be accepted as a disciple, an aspiring student would have to pay a fee, after which the study of each new piece of music required payment.

By the 13th and 14th centuries, biwa hōshi performed for the military elite and the aristocracy, including the regional daimyō feudal lords. Public performances were also given during Buddhist temple services. The general population had the further option of attending Kanjin performances, which they were required to pay a fee to see.

=== Sengoku to Edo period ===
The Ōnin War (1467–1477) proved a trying occurrence for the proliferation of the biwa hōshi. The war instigated the Sengoku period (15th–17th centuries), an era of civil war and political–military conflict that lasted for nearly two centuries. In this time, many heike musicians turned their attention to the jōruri or the shamisen three-stringed lute. Therefore, not only did the conflict cause a loss of performers, but also a decline in the number of listeners of the heikyoku.

However, the complete demise of the biwa hōshi was prevented by the daimyō Tokugawa Ieyasu, who favored the art of heike performance. Ieyasu ultimately reunified the country by establishing the Tokugawa shogunate, and became a fervent patron of the heike.

During the Edo period (1600–1868), the Tokugawa shogunate provided the Tōdō with special privileges and substantial financing, which the Tōdō then distributed to members according to rank. The Edo period also marks the era in which the shogunate designated heike as one of its official ceremonial forms of music. Accordingly, new schools of heike appeared, many of which were influenced by the newly introduced shamisen and its accompanying styles of music. The two predominant schools that came about during the Edo period were the Maeda-ryū founded by Maeda Kyūichi, and the Hatano-ryū founded by Hatano Kōichi. Both figures were members of the Shidō-ha, which was the most active branch of the older Ichikata school.

Collaborations were formed between amateur aficionados of the heike who, over the course of the Edo period, made small revisions to the musical notation of the heike score. The ceremonial form of the heike performed for the shogunate became increasingly solemn and refined to meet the standards of the intellectual class. Moreover, to ensure the development of the heike score, improvisation notably declined.

=== Meiji period to present ===
In 1868, the Meiji Restoration heralded the collapse of the Tokugawa shogunate. This ultimately contributed to the abolition of the Tōdō, which undermined social privileges for the musicians and reduced the availability of avenues for performance. The Hatano-ryū, in particular, underwent a debilitating decline in popularity, so much so that it struggled to survive in Kyoto until the middle of the 20th century. In addition, the rise in popularity of the shamisen, which accompanied contemporary songs and narratives, made the ancient tales of the Heike appear antiquated. By the end of the Edo period, the koto had replaced the biwa as the most common instrument used among blind musicians.

The heike tradition persisted, however, through the Tsugaru lineage (transmitted by sighted performers) and the Nagoya lineage (transmitted by professional blind musicians of the Tōdō tradition), both of which belonged to the Maeda-ryū. The Tsugaru lineage consisted of Kusumi Taisō (1815–1882), who learned the heike of the Edo Maeda-ryū, as well as his sons Tateyama Zennoshin and Tateyama Kōgo, both of whom lamented the decline of heike in the late years of Meiji and sought to foster a number of pupils. In Nagoya, a city which had been a thriving centre for heike performance, a small faction of blind male players continued to transmit heike alongside other mediums of music of growing popularity, such as the koto and shamisen. Differences exist between these lineages due to geographical separation and changes that have occurred uniquely in time. For example, the Nagoya lineage relied almost entirely on oral transmission. Nevertheless, the Nagoya heike and Tsugaru heike were both nominated by the Japanese government as "Intangible Cultural Properties" in 1955 and 1959 respectively, with Nagoya performers Inokawa Kōji, Doizaki Masatomi and Mishina Masayasu nominated as national treasures.

The libretto notation on which remaining heikyoku performance is based today in Nagoya is called Heike Shosetsu. It was composed by Ogino Tomoichi (1732–1801), initially a disciple in the Hatano-ryū faction, before acquiring the post of kengyō in the Kyoto branch of the Maeda-ryū school; Tomoichi had great knowledge of both major schools as a Hatano-ryū disciple master. As such, he played a fundamental role in the revival of the biwa hōshi.

Toru Takemitsu also contributed to the continuation of the biwa by collaborating with Western composers. Recognising that traditional Japanese music, and interest in it, was quickly falling out of fashion, Takemitsu, as well as a number of composers before him, noted that studies in music theory and music composition almost entirely consisted of Western theory and instruction. Though some Western composers had begun to incorporate Japanese music and Japanese instruments into their compositions, these composers often focused on those Japanese instruments most similar to Western ones; for example, Michio Miyagi's utilization of the koto. Takemitsu, on the other hand, collaborated with Western composers and compositions to include the distinctly Asian-sounding biwa. His well-received compositions revitalized interest in the biwa in the modern day.

According to Hugh de Ferranti, modern, live performances of biwa narrative singing are rare, with almost all performers being "practitioners of Chikuzen-biwa and Satsuma-biwa". The satsuma-biwa "emerged from interaction between moso and the samurai class" in Satsuma Province, starting a period of popularity for "modern biwa" until the 1930s, while the chikuzen-biwa had its origin in the 1890s in the Chikuzen region of Kyushu, drawing upon aspects of mōsō music, shamisen, and the satsuma-biwa technique. These traditions enjoyed widespread appreciation during the early 20th century due to the "nationalist, militarist sentiments of late-Meiji imperialist ideology". In the post-war era, these traditions were considered "refined classical pursuits", resulting in their popularity beyond heike-biwa. The biwa itself is also depicted with the image of goddess Benzaiten at her shrines, and in images of the Seven Lucky Gods (七福神, Shichi Fukujin) "in homes, shops, and offices".

The biwa ... is tied forever to the world of the Tale of the Heike; a gloomy world of martial valour and samurai ghosts

— Hugh de Ferranti

However, modern associations with biwa are mainly connected to the biwa hōshi, themselves linked to the Tale of Heike and Hōichi the Earless, well-known works taught in schools and readapted for television series, manga, popular literature and other media. As such, "most Japanese come to think of the biwa as a battered old string instrument played by a decrepit blind man who looks like a Buddhist priest and wanders about chanting old tales about war and ghosts". According to Ferranti, "outside of the realms of scholarship and the few who are involved in learning and performing", few Japanese civilians are familiar with the aural qualities of the biwa and cannot recognize its tones with references to ancient war-tales. The instrument is viewed as antiquated, a relic of the past that "cannot be a thing of contemporary Japanese life and experience, but is tied forever to the world of the Tale of the Heike; a gloomy world of martial valour and samurai ghosts".

== Biwa and biwa hōshi in society ==
=== Blindness ===
For most of Japan's recorded history, music and narrative performance were common activities for the blind, whose importance in most other major genres is also unavoidable, save for court and theatre music, from the 13th century until the 19th. Folk and literature attest "invariably about blind biwa hōshi and zatō", and only in modern times do sighted musicians master such instruments like the biwa.

According to De Ferranti, the act of playing lutes for alms by blind musicians finds its roots in Indian Buddhist culture during the 1st millennium CE. As early as the 4th century, blind itinerants in South Asia, described by texts such as the Ashokavadana as holy men, played lutes for alms. A 7th-century text from China and Japan's early 12th-century Konjaku Monogatarishū recount this story, while other "scattered accounts" of blind lute-laying priests can be found in Tang-period volumes from China. In the Shanbei region near Inner Mongolia, "blind beggars who recited tales and travelled with pipa accompanists were common", prior to the 1949 revolution. Under Mao Zedong, blind itinerants called shuoshude (Chinese: 说书的) played a three-string lute in "household ritual contexts" using their narrative "as a potent force for social reform" by the Communist Party.

Prior to the spread of Buddhism during the 6th to 9th centuries, it was "generally acknowledged that in Japanese ritual life blind men and women [were] respected as shamanic celebrants who bore numinous power because of their separation from the world experienced by others". Historically, the blind performed healing rituals for curing illness and exorcising spirits. For music, plucking or striking string instruments also have ritual meanings, and were tasks probably given to blind individuals to perform in belief of their shamanistic abilities. The Azusa Yumi was utilized for summoning deities in a pre-Buddhist ritual, likely involving the blind. The role of early biwa hōshi in delivery the vocal performance of battle tales "to allay the fury of slain warriors' ghosts" further implies a shamanistic qualification of the blind. Historical references suggest biwa hōshi were involved in both divination and also in this fundamental role of placating aggravated spirits, especially those killed in battle.

The intimate ties between the biwa and the blind in the Tōdō and various regional groups for mōsō (盲僧, "blind priests") further cement this inseparable relationship. Blindness was a necessary condition for membership in these organizations, which looked after blind heike performers and professionals and blind biwa ritualists respectively. In the Tōdō, heike performers came to control the guild, and thus the lives of many Japanese blind people. According to the legends of these institutions, "the lineage of blind biwa players ultimately is traced to ... a blind disciple of the historical Buddha Shakyamuni, called Gankutsu Sonja".

However, according to Hugh de Ferranti, not all blind biwa players of antiquity "were completely lacking the sense of vision and knowledge of music". Indeed, many people called blind were likely "only impaired in their vision", evidenced by the denotation of words for blind people such as mōjin (盲人), zatō, and mekura (盲). Also, many blind individuals gain the ailment gradually, resulting from aging, illness, or accident, meaning literacy may have been acquired earlier in life. Hugh de Ferranti states that notable numbers of biwa performers "were sighted and in some cases literate", evidenced by records of the Jojuin mōsō tradition and historical membership of the Gensei Hōryū mōsō group. Such individuals thus must be acknowledged for potential importance in producing written texts and in the "transmission of repertory".

=== Religious significance ===
Buddhist iconography throughout East and South-East Asia depict short-necked lutes being played by celestial beings as well as the Hindu goddess Saraswati, who led such divine musicians. Avatars of Sarasvati, "the biwa-playing Hindu goddess of music, wisdom, and eloquence", also play the lute in Tibetan and Chinese iconographic displays; such avatars correspond to Benzaiten, a Japanese deity known for holding a biwa in her benevolent arms.

Japanese iconography indicates two female lute-playing deities: the aforementioned Benzaiten and Myōonten; their identities are often fused together, but both have their roots in the continental Asian tradition, and can be traced from Sarasvati through various forms. Benzaiten represents eloquence while Myōonten epitomizes music itself. As the bodhisattva named "Miraculous Sound", Myōon Bōsatsu is described in the Lotus Sutra and was important for biwa players in court society. Her influence would spread beyond the court, integrating itself especially in the biwa hōshi tradition. After the early 8th century however, most sculptures and iconographic depictions show the pipa instead of the lute.

Locations whose name contain the characters or sounds biwa also have sanctified lore. Lake Biwa is famous for Chikubu-shima, where Taira no Tsunemasa performs at the Benzaiten shrine, whose deity appears in the form of a white dragon. Especially in Kyushu, there are biwa hills, valleys, ponds, and bridges throughout Japan, where performers supposedly buried or offered instruments to the local waters. Other legends of certain sects and accounts from ancient texts further the sacred associations of the biwa instrument.

=== Women ===
Despite the depiction of Benzaiten, the patron deity of music revered by biwa hōshi and mōsō, as a female entity and the existence of highly celebrated female biwa players in 20th century, with the "exception of avocational performance by women in the court music tradition", professional biwa players were men until the shamisen's use in the 16th century. Along with blindness, maleness was a necessary condition for admission to the mōsō and Tōdō. However, it was common in Tang China for women to play the pipa, as it was also common for courtly women from the Heian through Muromachi periods to learn biwa in childhood. There are also a few rare references to both sighted and blind female entertainers who may have played biwa, though in the Edo period, some female enthusiasts learned from heike-biwa professionals as a recreational activity.

Itinerant women performers did still exist in medieval Japan, though they are most frequently shown playing the tsuzumi drum. In the Edo period, singers called goze often accompanied themselves on the shamisen or koto, the latter of which was played by "affluent blind women who taught it to the wives of samurai and merchants". The former along with its wooden imitation, gottan were played for performance to procure alms, house to house; this was called 門付 kadozuke. In Kyushu, goze were not uncommon with such performers mentioned in the Tōdō's late-18th-century accounts. Although not bona fide members of the guild, goze held annual festivals, and this profession continued to be viable into the mid-1900s.

=== Social status ===
Though blindness in Japanese society has historically been stigmatized "as the result of a Buddhist interpretation of the condition as a form of karmic punishment", other factors also led to the marginalization and discrimination of blind musicians. In general, the blind were treated according to the restrictions of their societal rank. In other words, commoner townsmen (chōnin) and warrior–rank blind people "were allowed to engage in the professions available to all of similar rank, within the constraints of their visual impairment", while those in agrarian households were expected to contribute to the payment of land taxes via any means of labor possible. However, the most common professions for all such peoples included music, massage, acupuncture and moxa therapy, while ritual work was common in specialized locations.

As for itinerant performers, the most affluent could "make a living during the Edo period as teachers and performers based at their homes", while the rest (representing the majority of zatō and goze) relied on kadozuke, regarded as a form of begging, despite its ritual associations. Door-to-door performances delivered by professionals associated to shrines and temples also occurred in the historical practice of seasonal rites and celebrations for farming areas; they were considered to be of low status by the middle class, however, and were affiliated with the Sanjō districts in which "the discriminated classes" lived. However, folk beliefs in the visits of kami during such harvest festivals to rid villagers of impurity upon receiving gifts from householders may have provided a socio-cultural basis for the willingness to offer food and money to itinerant performers; further, kadozuke was seen as an act of merit.

According to Hugh de Ferranti, iconographic and literary sources generally portray biwa hōshi as solitary and pitiable figures, though wealthy and powerful individuals also exist in such representations. Sometimes they are depicted as mysterious, frightening, and potentially dangerous individuals while in other sources, they are "ridiculous" characters "to be made fun of, at times with unbridled cruelty". Folklore links biwa hōshi to ghosts through their placation of wronged spirits and the chinkon ritual performance, accounts for their fearful quality. However, kyōgen plays called zatō-mono feature deliberate tricking of a blind zatō so that he becomes lost and disoriented, or suffers losses and misunderstanding. Such action is provoked by sighted individuals for pure amusement, as in the stories of Saru zatō and Tsukimi zatō. Picture scrolls marry this "similar sense of biwa hōshi as bizarre, somewhat frightening figures who can nevertheless be taunted". In these images, people "look out from their houses at the biwa players and appear to be laughing or jeering at them", while children run away from and dogs bark at them.

== Development of the heike style ==
The present trend of scholarly analysis is to consider the heike's origin as having arisen first as a biwa recitation for the purpose of spreading Buddhism. According to the Tsurezuregusa or Essays in Idleness, in the reign of the cloistered emperor Go-Toba, Yukinaga – the man in charge of the household of the chief advisor to the emperor, Fujiwara Kanezane – often exchanged poems with the imperial court. He was invited to an imperial discourse on poems, and unable to recall two of the seven virtues, was thus named the Jack of Five Virtues. Embarrassed, he gave up on learning poetry and took the tonsure, and became a monk under the abbot Jien of the Tendai sect. Jien was known to gather talent at the Shōren-in temple on Mount Hiei in Kyoto to discuss ways of spreading the Tendai faith. Many here were biwa hōshi. It is in this way that Yukinaga legendarily wrote the script of the Tale of the Heike, and taught it to a mōsō-biwa from eastern Japan named Shōbutsu, renowned for his impressive narrative delivery and extensive knowledge of warriors, bows, and horses.

According to George Gish, there were five essential ingredients for the development of the heike:

1. Chinese popular sermons designed to appeal to the masses, known as zokkō (俗講)
2. Epic ballad narration entitled wasan (和讃), later revised into a new shōmyō (声明) or Buddhist chant called the Rokudō kōshiki (六道講式) in reference to the six worlds of Buddhism, which became the chief model for the singing
3. Shōdō (唱導) style of Buddhist preaching with melody, a style favored by Jien
4. Mōsō-biwa influence from the Kyoto-mōsō school from which idea of accompanying narration with biwa derives
5. The heike story itself chronicling the Taira/Genji Heian period, oft interpreted as one phase of Buddhism's six worlds. The story is treated as a shōdō, or sermon with the purpose of enlightenment.

Heikyoku musically is influenced by Buddhist chant, and the kōshiki and shōmyō traditions of the biwa from the 11th and 12th centuries. Indeed, it is a combination of the monogatari style practiced by gaku- and mōsō-biwa, and shōmyō narrative. Author Yukinaga brought elements of the court tradition, while Jien offered shomyo aspects. Shōbutsu as a Kyoto-mōsō and a biwa hōshi brought unique perspectives as well.

The heike-biwa instrument itself is a combination of gaku- and mōsō-biwa predecessors. Indeed, the relative average distance between the frets is equal to that of heike-biwa, as are the relative height of the frets. From Shobutsu, two schools emerged, the Yasaka-ryū school, led by Jōgen, and Ichikata-ryū school, headed by Jōichi. Akashi Kakuichi was Jōichi's disciple and a favorite of shōgun Ashikaga Takauji, possibly due to blood relations. Kakuichi soon gained the rank of kengyō, the head of guild for the blind, the Tōdō; he died in 1371 during the peak of the heike-biwa.

Musically, development continued with the Ichikata-ryū, with it spreading into four separate branches. During the Edo period, the main branches split further with the influence of the shamisen style. The main schools were Hatano-ryū and Maeda-ryū, named after their respective founders; intense rivalry between the schools, compounded by changes in the music world at large, contributed to the decline of the heike tradition.

The growing utilization of the shamisen by the mid-16th century precipitated new innovations in popular music. Some of the earliest innovations were carried out by heike players. They would use a biwa-type plectrum on the shamisen to emulate the biwa buzzing effect and sounds. The opportunities with the shamisen attracted others, and their patrons and listeners along with them. The new idiom of song made the old styles of heikyoku antiquated, especially with the koto as a new instrument.

== See also ==
- Blind musicians

== Bibliography ==
- De Ferranti, Hugh. The Last Biwa Singer: a Blind Musician in History, Imagination, and Performance. Ithaca, NY: Cornell UP, 2009.
- Frederic, Louis. Japan Encyclopedia. Belknap, Harvard University Press, 2008.
- Gish, George W. The Biwa in History, Its Origins and Development in Japan. Ann Arbor: University of Michigan, 1967.
- Groemer, Gerald. The Spirit of Tsugaru: Blind Musicians, Tsugaru-jamisen, and the Folk Music of Northern Japan, with the Autobiography of Takahashi Chikuzan. Sterling Heights: Harmonie Park Press, 1999.
- History of Japanese Traditional Music. Japanese Traditional Music. Columbia Music Entertainment, 2002. Retrieved 2011-04-04.
- The Asiatic Society of Japan. Transactions of the Asiatic Society of Japan. University of Oregon Libraries. University of Oregon, 1918. Retrieved 2011-04-04.
- Tokita, Alison, and David W. Hughes. The Ashgate Research Companion to Japanese Music. Aldershot, Hampshire, England: Ashgate, 2008.
