= Kizen Sasaki =

Japanese folklorist (1886–1933)

- Born: October 5, 1886; Tōno, Iwate, Japan
- Died: September 29, 1933 (aged 46)
- Other name: 佐々木 喜善
- Occupation: folklorist

Kizen Sasaki (佐々木喜善, Sasaki Kizen), also sometimes Sun-Hee Sasaki and Kyōseki Sasaki (5 October 1886 – 29 September 1933), was a Japanese folklorist, sometimes known as the Japanese Grimm.

== Biography ==
He was the son of a wealthy farming family from Tōno, Iwate. He attended Shiritsu Tetsugakukan (now Toyo University) and then graduated with a degree in literature from Waseda University in 1905. In 1908, he became acquainted with Kunio Yanagita, and Sasaki began to collaborate with Yanagita on collecting the oral traditions and tales of Iwate Prefecture. In his later years, he became friends with the poet Kenji Miyazawa with whom he shared his discoveries. Sasaki suffered from respiratory problems and died at the age of 46.

Professionally, Sasaki published a number of books of collected folktales and customs.

== Sources ==
- Yamada, Norio (1977) 柳田国男の光と影 : 佐々木喜善物語 (Yanagita Kunio no hikari to kage, Kunio Yanagida's light and shadow: A Biography of Kizen Sasaki) 農山漁村文化協会 (Rural Cultural Association); electronic location HathiTrust Digital Library (search only)
