= Heike Shamisen =

Japanese musical instrument

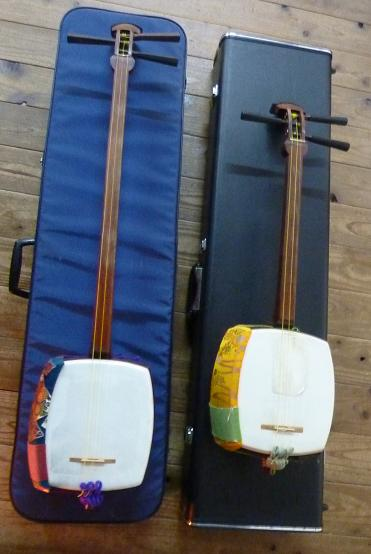
The heike shamisen compared with a medium-sized, or chuzao shamisen

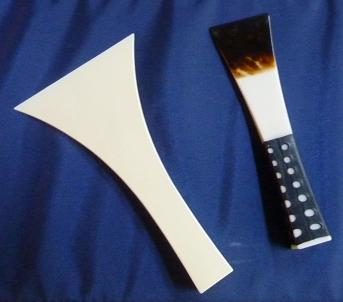
Plectrums for a minyo and heike shamisen

The heike shamisen (Japanese: 平家三味線), is a Japanese musical instrument, member of the shamisen family. Like its other counterparts, the heike shamisen has three strings, a slender neck, a body taut with skin, and it is plucked with a plectrum called a bachi.

== Construction ==
What is peculiar about the heike shamisen is that it is made particularly for the use in one song, called Heike Ondo, which is a folk song from Shimonoseki, Yamaguchi Prefecture, Japan. As the song calls for a higher range of notes, the heike shamisen is constructed with a shorter neck than conventional shamisen. It is possible to use a normal-sized shamisen in place of a heike shamisen, but it must be prepared with a capo device, known as "kase" in Japanese. In Japanese music, there is a buzzy sound quality that is often preferred called "sawari," and this effect is adjusted by a device often found built into the shamisen, that raises or lowers the 1st string at the nut. A drawback to using a shamisen with a capo in place of a heike shamisen is that it disables the use of an on-board sawari device.

== Heike Bachi ==
The bachi, or plectrum, used to play the instrument, is also smaller and more slender than most plectrums used to play the shamisen. Whereas most plectrums are triangular in shape, the heike bachi is more square and angular.

== Tuning ==
The heike shamisen is usually tuned in ni agari," which means "raised two" or "raised second," which is a reference to the fact that the pitch of the second string is raised from a base tuning called honchoshi." Normally, the shamisen is tuned so that the first and third strings are tuned to an octave, and the second string is tuned to a fourth from the first string. In "ni agari," the second string is raised to a fifth from the first string. An example of ni agari is D, A, D.

== Musical notation ==
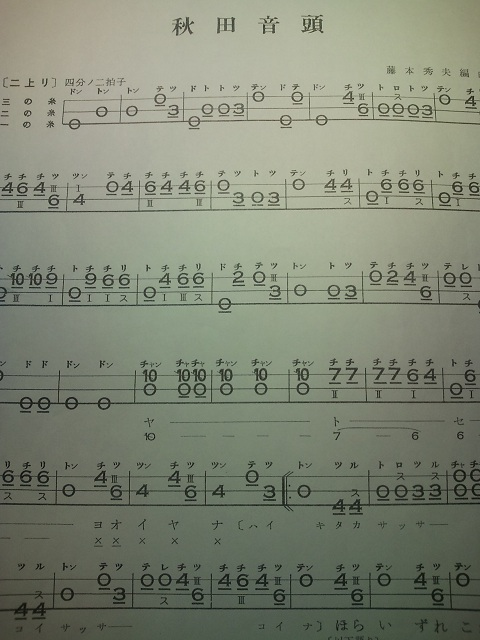
Horizontal shamisen tablature, read from left to right. Similar to guitar tablature, three horizontal lines represent the strings of the shamisen.

Traditionally there is no musical notation for heike shamisen, and students are expected to learn the melodies by heart. In recent times, however, common melodies have been written down in tablature notation to facilitate learning.

== See also ==
- Shamisen
- Tsugaru-jamisen
- Sanshin
- Sanxian
- Biwa
