= List of Intangible Cultural Properties of Japan (Kagoshima) =

This list is of the Intangible Cultural Properties of Japan in the Prefecture of Kagoshima.

== National Cultural Properties ==
As of 1 August 2015, zero Important Intangible Cultural Properties have been designated.

== Prefectural Cultural Properties ==
As of 1 April 2015, three properties have been designated at a prefectural level.

=== Performing Arts ===
Property	Holder	Comments	Image	Ref.
Satsuma biwa 薩摩琵琶; Satsuma biwa	Satsuma Biwa Appreciation Society (薩摩琵琶同好会)			
Myōon jūnigaku 妙音十二楽 myōon jūni-gaku	Myōon Jūnigaku Preservation Society (妙音十二楽保存会)	eight voices, including the biwa, taiko, flute, and hand-clapping, perform a repertoire of twelve pieces including Wind in the pines (松風) and Village rain (村雨); with its origin in temple music, performances take place in the Jōraku-in (中島常楽院) in Hioki on 12 October each year		
Tenpuku 天吹 tenpuku	Tenpuku Appreciation Society (天吹同好会)	the tenpuku or tenpū is a bamboo flute around thirty centimetres in length, similar in shape to the shakuhachi and with a higher pitch range		

== Municipal Cultural Properties ==
As of 1 April 2015, six properties have been designated at a municipal level.
