= Heike ondo =

Japanese folk song

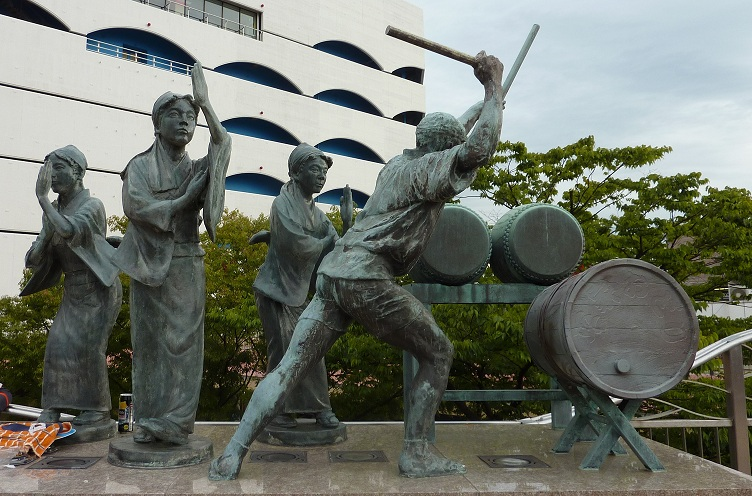
Statues depicting heike ondo performers and heike odori dancers, in front of the Sea Mall, Shimonoseki

Heike ondo (平家音頭) is a Japanese folk song that originates from Shimonoseki, Yamaguchi Prefecture in Japan. The song is basically a narrative of the Battle of Dan-no-ura, which was a major sea battle of the Genpei War, occurring at Dan-no-ura, in the Shimonoseki Strait. It is played during the summer to accompany the Heike Odori, which is the bon dance of the area.

== Form ==
Heike Ondo has a quick, up-beat tempo, and it is always performed with particular taiko ensembles including two taiko drums and a sake barrel, called a "taru", each. A single drummer alternates between the two drums and the taru barrel in his or her ensemble, in intricate drumming techniques. Heike Ondo is accompanied by a kind of shamisen called the Heike Shamisen, which has a shorter neck than most shamisens in Japan, and thus, a higher range. The narrative is quite long and is rarely ever sung in its entirety; key excerpts are chosen for shorter performances. The song is sung by a main singer accompanied by a group of singers who know when to call out the kakegoe (see below).

== Dance (Heike Odori) ==
The dance that accompanies Heike Ondo is called Heike Odori (平家踊り). It is simple and it can either proceed around a yagura or in a straight line along a designated street. The dance proceeds forward with a few steps backward. Observers of Heike Odori will immediately notice the dance's pronounced hand movements, first the left hand, then the right hand, and then both hands together. It is said that the dance is supposed to be portraying grief and sorrow; the song and the dance tell a narrative of the Battle of Dan-no-ura from the losing side's perspective. The hand movements are supposed to symbolize wiping tears from one's face in a gesture of crying.

== Kakegoe ==
Heike Ondo is marked by the following kakegoe:

"A arya arya makkashoi!"

"A yosa yosa!"

"A yato e, sora e no yato e no e!"

and

"A dokkoi, dokkoi!"

== Media Links ==
- Video of Heike Ondo and Heike Odori Performers
