= Kinshi Tsuruta =

Japanese musician (1911–1995)

Kinshi TSURUTA
- Born: August 15, 1911; Hokkaido
- Died: April 4, 1995 (aged 83)
- Other name: 鶴田 錦史、鶴田 菊枝(Kikue TSURUTA)
- Occupation: Biwa player

Kinshi Tsuruta (鶴田 錦史, Tsuruta Kinshi; August 8, 1911--April 4, 1995) was a Japanese musician.

== As a Biwa player ==
Tsuruta specialized in the ancient pear-shaped plucked lute called the biwa, and also sang. She developed her own form of the Satsuma biwa, which is sometimes referred to as Tsuruta biwa. This biwa differs from the traditional Satsuma biwa in the number of frets, construction of the head, and occasionally a doubled 4th string. The additional frets allows a wider range of notes to be played which makes it possible to perform modern and western compositions.

Tsuruta achieved international attention for her New York City premiere performance, in November 1967, of Tōru Takemitsu's November Steps with the New York Philharmonic, under the direction of Seiji Ozawa (with shakuhachi player Katsuya Yokoyama).

She has many well known students, such as Yukio Tanaka, Yoshiko Sakata, and Junko Ueda.

== See also ==
- Biwa

== Links ==
- Schwebeablaut (Kinshi Tsuruta – Biwa, the World of Tsuruta Kinshi (1995))
