= Carlo Forlivesi =

Italian composer (born 1971)

Carlo Forlivesi (born 23 October 1971) is an Italian composer, performer and researcher.

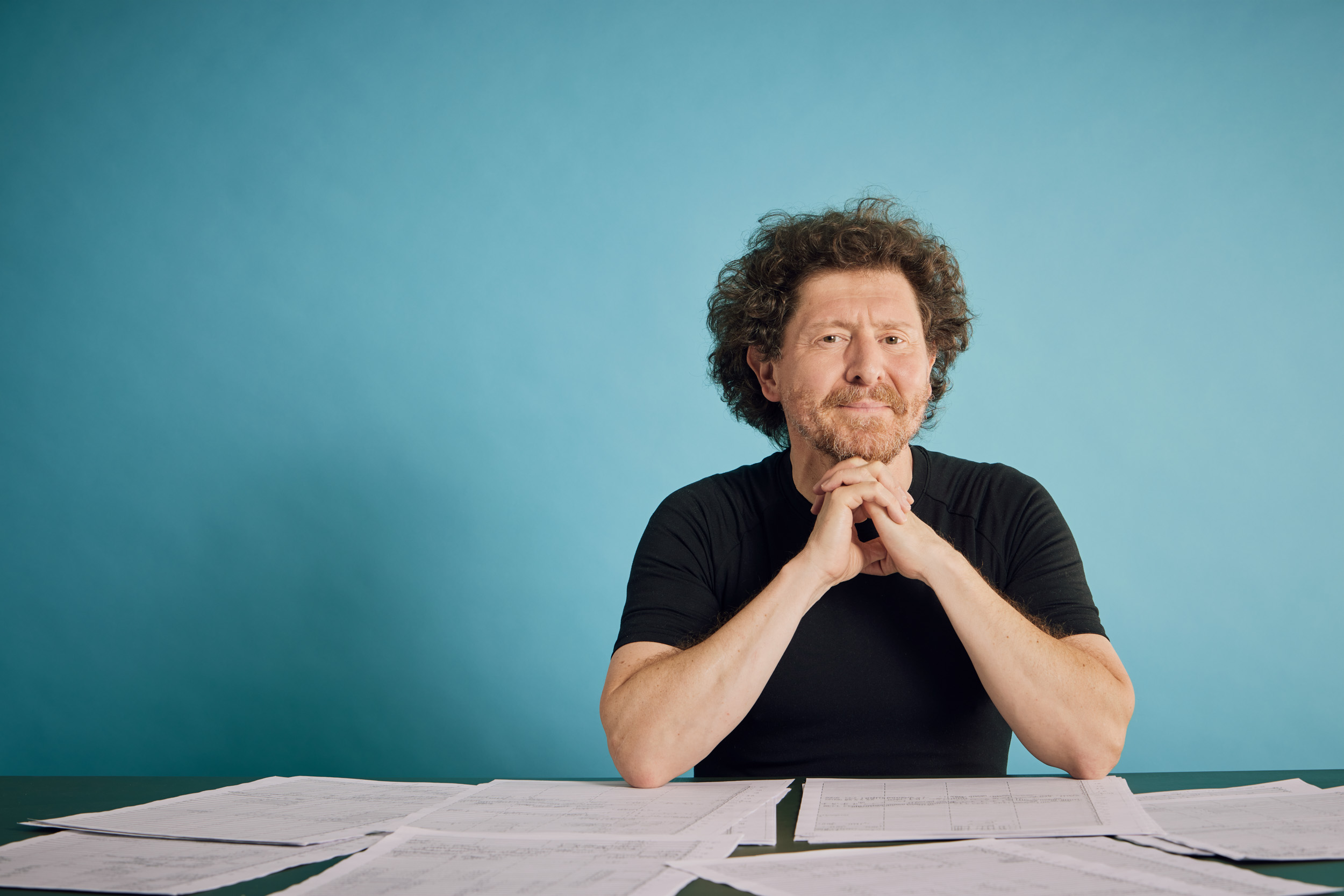
Carlo Forlivesi (Stuttgart, 2023) Photo: Joel Micah Miller

Forlivesi was born in Faenza, Emilia-Romagna. He studied at Bologna Conservatory, Milan Conservatory and the Accademia Nazionale di Santa Cecilia of Rome. He then joined IRCAM (Institute de Recherche et Coordination Acoustique/Musique) and subsequently DIEM (Danish Institute of Electroacoustic Music), Tokyo College of Music, and Northwestern University, with fellowships from the governments of Italy, Denmark, Japan, and the United States (Fulbright Commission).

His activity has mainly focused on new music in Europe, the United States, and Japan. Forlivesi has conducted extensive research in the field of traditional Japanese music and dance including the ethnic music of the Ainu. Beside contemporary music, he cultivates a particular interest in early music, which he studied and performed for several years.

Forlivesi has collaborated with first-class performers and received numerous awards. His music is regularly programmed by festivals and theatres worldwide. Several times nominated artist-in-residence, lecturer, workshop coach, and music–contest judge, Forlivesi's international stance is reflected in his eclectic output, which includes compositions for orchestra, choir, chamber music, dance, electronics, and traditional Japanese instruments as well as choreographies and written works.

Since 2008 he has been a lecturer at Sapporo University, and an AFAM professor at the Italian State Conservatories of Cagliari, Adria, Modena, Foggia-Rodi and Fermo. In 2019 Forlivesi was appointed professor of Composition at the State University of Music and Performing Arts Stuttgart (locum tenens Marco Stroppa), and in 2021 he received a tenured professorship at the State Conservatory of Music Gioachino Rossini of Pesaro.

== Silenziosa Luna ==
In 2008, Forlivesi released his debut album Silenziosa Luna (Japanese: 沈黙の月, Hepburn: Chinmoku no Tsuki) through ALM Records. "Silenziosa luna" is a quotation from Giacomo Leopardi's poem Canto notturno di un pastore errante dell'Asia.

The album includes works written by Forlivesi between 1999 and 2008. The 28-page booklet reflects the artistic and cultural concerns of the team about the recording, and the liner notes provide information about the musicians and lyrics and give details on the extent of each musical work, placing them in cultural and creative contexts. They were written in Italian originally and directly translated into Japanese and English, respectively by Japanese musicologist Mariko Kanemitsu and British composer/poet Jeremy Drake. Japanese jiuta-mai dancer Sayuri Uno, American academic Laura Hein (Northwestern University) and Italian philosopher Marco Forlivesi (University of Padua) also made a significant contribution to this process.

Musicians who worked on the album: Yukio Tanaka (voice and biwa), Kumiko Shuto (voice and biwa), Yosuke Irie (shakuhachi), Ayako Shigenari (13-string koto and 20-string koto), and Norio Sato (guitar).

The instrumental techniques developed on purpose for these works are highly demanding. 24bit/96 kHz recording technology is employed.

The photograph on the album cover is a shot taken by Carlo Forlivesi and Sayuri Uno in Shisen-dō and represents a round Tsukubai enhanced by natural shadows and reflections. It is a non-processed image, and has sprinkled silver and gold colors, resembling maki-e making. The disc fits the photo.

== Discography ==
Monograph:

- Carlo Forlivesi: Silenziosa Luna – 沈黙の月 / ALM Records ALCD-76 (2008)
- Carlo Forlivesi: Compositions / Tactus TC.970601 (2019)
- Carlo Forlivesi: ModernAntico / Stradivarius STR.37242 (2023)
- NAXOS - Carlo Forlivesi (1971) DISCOGRAPHY
- NAXOS Japan - Carlo Forlivesi (1971) Composer 作曲家
- NAXOS Japan - Carlo Forlivesi (1971) WORKLIST & ALBUMLIST 作品リスト / アルバムリスト
