= Shamisen =

Japanese plucked stringed instrument

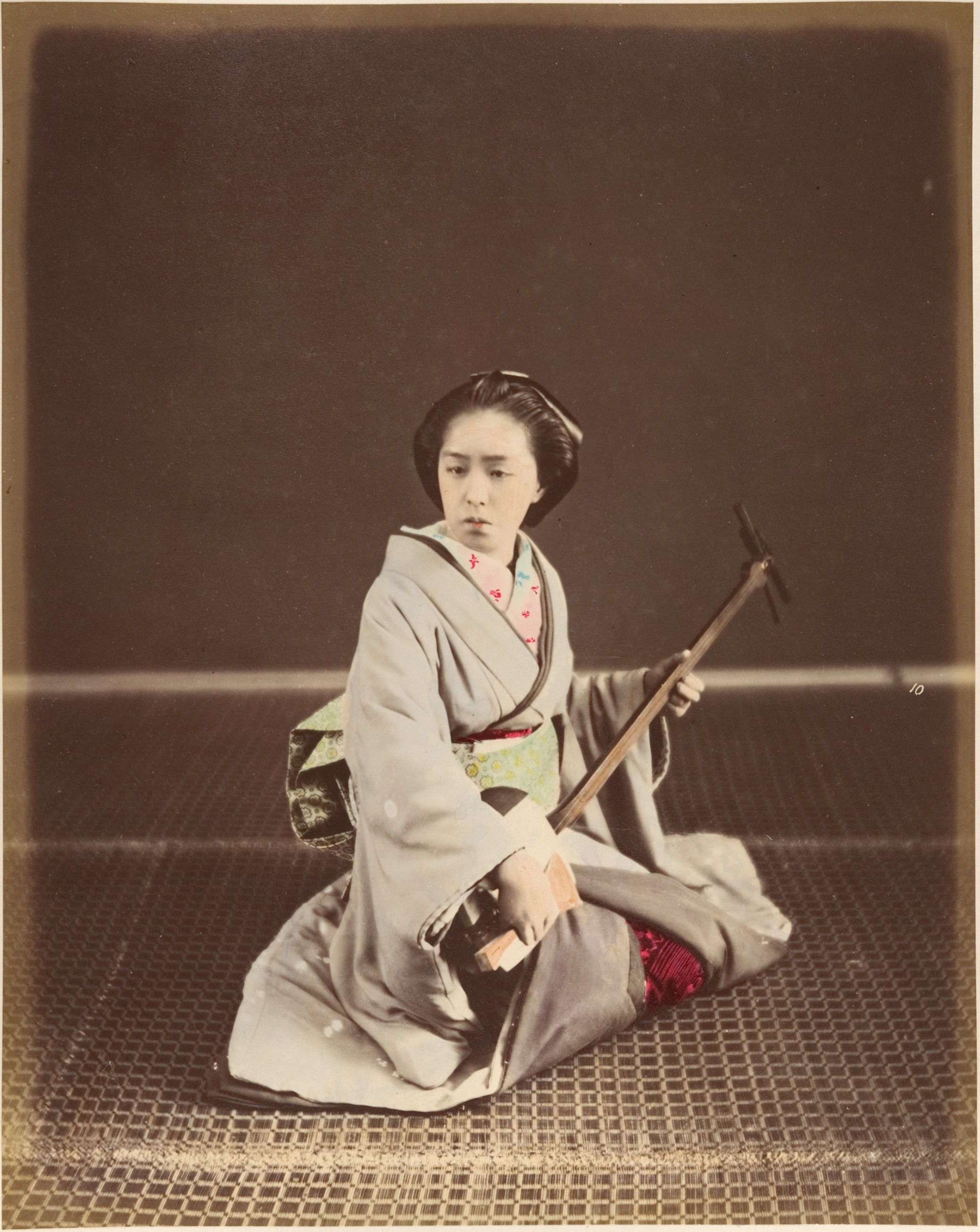
Tokyo geisha with shamisen, c. 1870s

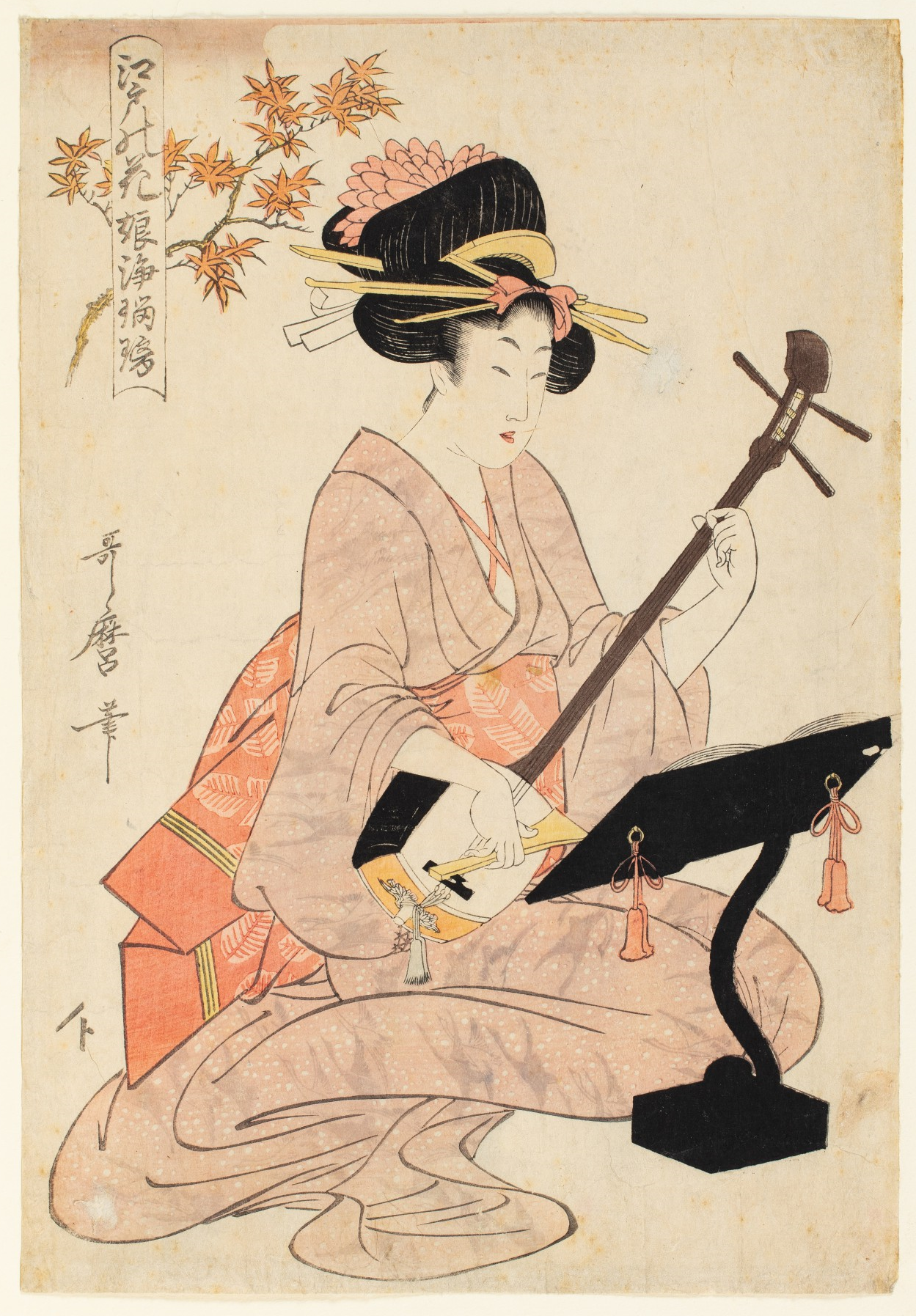
Kitagawa Utamaro, "Flowers of Edo: Young Woman's Narrative Chanting to the Samisen", c. 1800

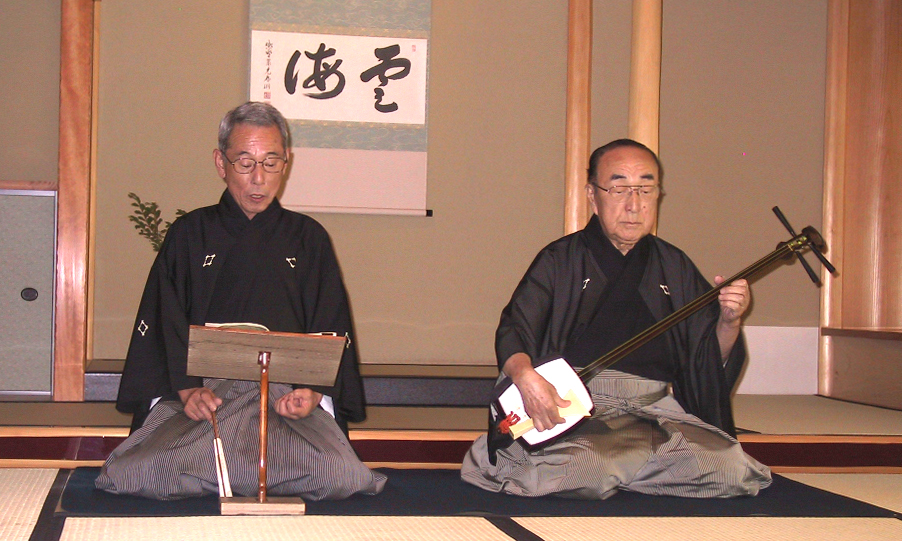
A Japanese man playing a shamisen while another sings

A shamisen accompanying the traditional kouta Kokoroshite (心して)

The shamisen or samisen (三味線), also known as sangen (三絃) (all meaning 'three strings'), is a three-stringed traditional Japanese musical instrument derived from the Chinese instrument sanxian. It is played with a plectrum called a bachi.

The Japanese pronunciation is usually shamisen but sometimes jamisen when used as a suffix, according to regular sound change (e.g. tsugaru-jamisen). In Western Japanese dialects and several Edo period sources, it is both written and pronounced as samisen.

The construction of the shamisen varies in shape, depending on the genre in which it is used. The instrument used to accompany kabuki has a thin neck, facilitating the agile and virtuosic requirements of that genre. The one used to accompany puppet plays and folk songs has a longer and thicker neck instead, to match the more robust music of those genres.

== Construction ==
Shamisen diagram: 1. head (tenjin); 2. ebio; 3. strings (ito); 4. protective piece of leather (bachigawa, azumasawari); 5. membrane (kawa); 6. bridge (koma); 7. silk knot holding strings (neo); 8. hatomune; 9. spike (nakagosaki); 10. peg sleeves (zagane); 11. peg (itomaki); 12. peg (itomaki); 13. peg (itomaki); 14. top bridge (kamikoma); 15. sawari valley (sawari-no tani); 16. azumasawari screw; 17. sawari mountain (sawari-no yama); 18. chibukuro; View A shows the neck and head of a Yamasawari shamisen. View B shows the neck and head of a Azumasawari shamisen.

The shamisen is a plucked stringed instrument. Its construction follows a model similar to that of a guitar or a banjo, with a neck and strings stretched across a resonating body. The neck of the shamisen is fretless and slimmer than that of a guitar or banjo. The body, called the dō (胴), resembles a drum, having a hollow body that is covered front and back with skin, in the manner of a banjo. The skin used depends on the genre of music and the skill of the player. Traditionally, skins were made using dog or cat skin, with cat skin favored for finer instruments; though use of animal skins was common throughout the 20th century, use of these skins gradually fell out of favor, starting around the mid 2000s, due to social stigma and the decline of workers skilled in preparing these particular skins. Contemporary shamisen skins are often prepared with synthetic materials, such as plastic.

The sao (棹), or neck of the shamisen, is usually divided into three or four pieces that fit and lock together, with most shamisen made to be easily disassembled. The neck of the shamisen is a singular rod that crosses the drum-like body of the instrument, partially protruding at the other side of the body and acting as an anchor for the strings. The pegs used to wind the strings are long, thin and hexagonal in shape; though they were traditionally fashioned out of ivory, due to scarcity and trading regulations regarding and constricting the sale of ivory, many are now constructed from other materials, such as wood and plastic.

The three strings of the shamisen are made of either silk (traditionally) or nylon. They are stretched between the pegs at the head of the instrument, and a cloth tailpiece anchored at the end of the rod which protrudes on the other side of the body. The strings are stretched across the body, raised from it by means of a bridge, or koma (駒), which rests directly on the taut skin. The lowest string is purposefully laid lower at the nut of the instrument in order to create a buzz, a characteristic timbre known as sawari (somewhat reminiscent of the "buzzing" of a sitar, which is called Jivari). The upper side of the dō (when on the player's lap) is almost always protected by a cover known as a dō kake, and players often wear a little band of cloth on their left hand to facilitate sliding up and down the neck, known as a yubikake. The head of the instrument known as a tenjin may also be protected by a cover. The material of the strings will depend on the skill of the player. Traditionally, silk strings are used. However, silk breaks easily over a short time, so this is reserved for professional performances. Students often use nylon or 'tetron' strings, which last longer than silk, and are also less expensive.

=== Variations in construction and playing method ===
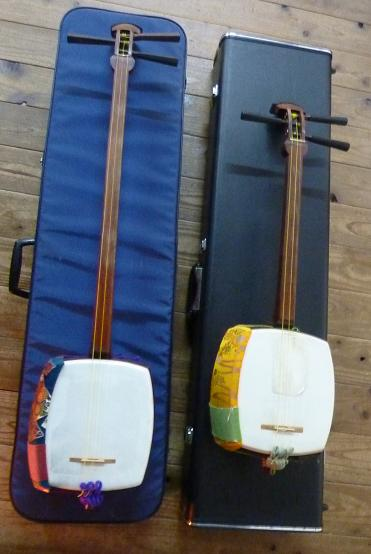
The heike shamisen compared with a medium-sized, or chuzao shamisen

The construction of the shamisen varies in shape and size, depending on the genre in which it is used. The bachi used will also be different according to genre, if it is used at all. Shamisen are classified according to size and genre. There are three basic sizes: hosozao, chuzao and futozao. Examples of shamisen genres include nagauta, jiuta, min'yo, kouta, hauta, shinnai, tokiwazu, kiyomoto, gidayu and tsugaru.

Shamisen used for traditional genres of Japanese music, such as jiuta, kouta, and nagauta, adhere to very strict standards. Purists of these genres demand that the shamisen be made of the correct wood, the correct skin, and are played with the correct bachi, with little room for variation. The tsugaru-jamisen, on the other hand, has lent itself to modern use, and is used in modern genres such as jazz and rock. As a more open instrument, variations of it exist for show. The tuning pegs, which are usually fashioned out of ivory, and bachi which are fashioned from a combination of ivory and tortoise-shell for example, are sometimes made of acrylic material to give the shamisen a more modern, flashy look. Recently, avant-garde inventors have developed a tsugaru-jamisen with electric pickups to be used with amplifiers, like the electric guitar.

==== Hosozao ====
The hosozao (細棹, literally "thin neck"), as its Japanese name implies, is the smallest kind of shamisen. The body is small and particularly square-shaped, with a particularly thin neck, which tapers away from the strings just as it approaches the body. Generally, the hosozao is used in nagauta, the shorter and thinner neck facilitating the agile and virtuosic requirements of kabuki. Hosozao shamisen built especially for nagauta ensembles are often simply known as nagauta shamisen. The hosozao is also often used in kouta, where it is plucked with the fingernails.

==== Chuzao ====
The chuzao (中棹, literally "middle neck") is a size up from the hosozao. As its name implies, the neck is slightly thicker. As the neck approaches the body of the instrument, the distance between the strings and the fingerboard is maintained, unlike the hosozao, where it tapers off. The fingerboard ends abruptly, and the rest of the neck curves sharply into the body of the instrument. The pronounced curve that occurs just before the neck meets the body is called hatomune (鳩胸, literally "pigeon's breast"). The result is an extended fingerboard that gives the chuzao a higher register than the hosozao. The chuzao is favored for jiuta-style playing, with a broader, more mellow timbre. It is also an "all-round" instrument that can be used across many genres.

==== Futozao ====
The futozao (太棹, literally "fat neck") shamisen is used in the robust music of gidayubushi (the music of bunraku), jōruri min'yo, and tsugaru-jamisen. In these genres, a thicker neck facilitates the greater force used in playing the music of these styles. The futozao of tsugaru-jamisen is quite a recent innovation, and is purposefully constructed in a much larger size than traditional style shamisen, and its neck is much longer and thicker than the traditional nagauta or jiuta shamisen.

==== Heike shamisen ====
The heike shamisen (平家) is a shamisen particularly fashioned for the performance of the song Heike Ondo, a folk tune originating from Shimonoseki, Yamaguchi Prefecture. The neck of the heike shamisen is about half the length of most shamisen, giving the instrument the high range needed to play Heike Ondo. The use of more typical shamisen is possible, but they must be properly adjusted with a capo device to raise their pitch to make them suitable for use. Today the strings are made out of steel to make a better sound and the drum heads are made out of plastic to avoid breakage in a performance.

==== Variations in bachi ====
The bachi (撥), the plectrum used to play the shamisen, also differ in size, shape, and material from genre to genre.

The bachi used for nagauta shamisen can be made out of three possible materials: wood, plastic, or ivory. While many nagauta teachers generally do not approve of the use of plastic, if ivory is unattainable and wood is still out of price range, plastic is considered acceptable for use.

Jiuta bachi are made entirely out of plastic or ivory, plastic and tortoiseshell (bekko), or ivory and tortoiseshell. Jiuta bachi are the easiest to identify as they are the longest, the widest, and also have a deep indentation where the tortoiseshell meets the handle. There are sometimes also jiuta bachi that are made with a buffalo horn handle. The material, however, makes no difference in the sound.

The gidayu shamisen style uses the heaviest and thickest bachi, though the nagauta bachi is wider.

The bachi used for tsugaru-jamisen is the smallest, and is almost always tipped with tortoiseshell.

==== Other structural variations ====
The koma (駒), or bridge, can be fashioned out of aged bamboo, ivory, ox-bone (shari), rosewood, buffalo horn, kōki wood, any combination of the above, or plastic for the student level. Koma come in many heights. The higher the koma, the louder the sound will be, and the harder it is to control a rapid sukui. Higher koma are not considered suitable for beginners.

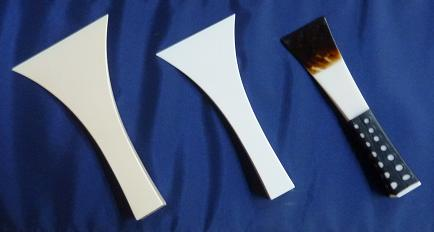
Bachi for min'yo, tsugaru and heike shamisen

The koma used for nagauta use a height between 3.2 and 3.6. Koma for nagauta are fashioned out of only three materials: ivory, bone, and plastic. Ivory is the most expensive and produces the most desirable sound and amplification, but due to its high price tag is normally only used in performances. Ox-bone or shari is the most popular koma material for practice and with students who are performing. Because of ivory's volume and vibration, it is normally used by a teacher or tate-jamisen (lead shamisen), so that the other players can follow their tone and signals. Plastic koma are increasingly harder in the modern day, as the material is considered to produce an undesirable sound when compared to shari koma. Shari is not much more expensive than plastic, and most teachers openly express their displeasure with plastic koma and require shari.

The koma used for jiuta vary between 2.6 and 2.8, though other heights can be specially ordered. Koma for jiuta are made out of a few select materials, such as yellow or black water buffalo horn (suigyu), which are the standard for jiuta. Blackwater buffalo horn does not have a significant sound difference when cut in the jiuta koma style, and is far less popular. Yellow suigyu is the most widely used for jiuta-style shamisen, both in practice and performance. Plastic is available because of the higher price tag of suigyu. Many people believe that for jiuta, there is not a great sound difference between the two, but there is a high change in vibration. Plastic makes a deader sound, which is not the most favorable for jiuta. Shari is used from time to time in practice, but never for jiuta performances.

Koma used for both tsugaru and min'yo shamisen are typically 2.6 in height, though sometimes 2.7 or 2.8. Tsugaru koma are very easily identifiable due to their unique structure and use of two different materials. Tsugaru koma are very thin in width, and are not very high. The base is usually made of either bamboo, smoked bamboo, or a wood of some kind, while the top half in which the strings pass through can be made of ivory, bone, or tortoiseshell. Because of the thickness of both the strings and neck of the futozao shamisen, the tsugaru bridge in general tends to be longer than the others. Both the gidayu koma (the highest koma made, fashioned out of black buffalo horn) and the kiyomoto koma (which resembles the nagauta koma exactly, save for its width) are sometimes confused with the tsugaru koma.

== Variations in playing ==
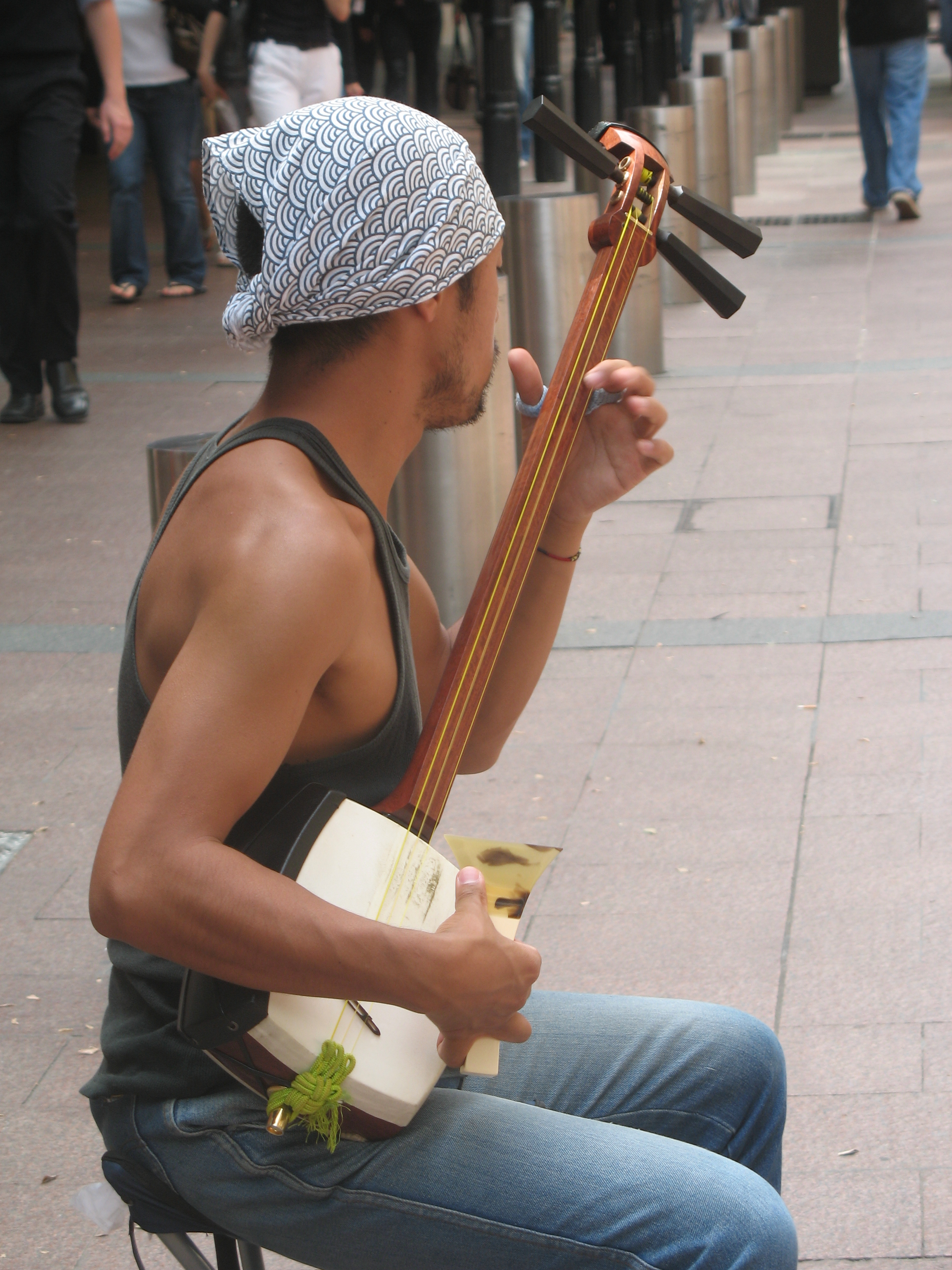
A busker playing a shamisen in Sydney, Australia

In most genres, the shamisen strings are plucked with a bachi. The sound of a shamisen is similar in some respects to that of the American banjo, in that the drum-like dō, amplifies the sound of the strings. As in the clawhammer style of American banjo playing, the bachi is often used to strike both string and skin, creating a highly percussive sound. When playing kouta (小唄, literally "little song") on the shamisen, and occasionally in other genres, the shamisen is plucked with the fingers. Sometimes, the shamisen is bowed with a violin bow, similar to the kokyū, a similar instrument.

== Tuning ==
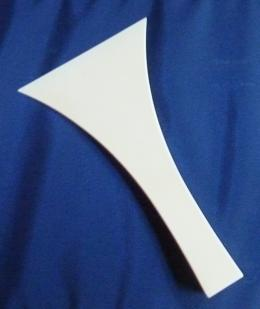
Bachi, or the plectrum used for playing the shamisen

The shamisen is played and tuned according to genre, with the nomenclature of the nodes in an octave also varying according to genre. A number of shamisen styles exist across Japan, and tunings, tonality and notation vary to some degree. Three of the most commonly recognized tunings across all genres are honchoushi (本調子), niagari (二上がり), and sansagari (三下がり).

=== Honchoushi ===
Honchoushi means "home tuning" or "base tuning", and is called so because other tunings are considered to derive from it. For honchoushi, the first and third strings are tuned an octave apart, while the middle string is tuned to the equivalent of a fourth, in Western terms, from the 1st string. The most commonly used tuning is C-F-C. An example of a song that uses this tuning is Akita Nikata Bushi.

=== Niagari ===
Niagari means "raised two" or "raised second", referring to the fact that the pitch of the second string is raised (from honchoushi), increasing the interval of the first and second strings to a fifth (conversely decreasing the interval between the second and third strings to a fourth). The most commonly used tuning is C-G-C. An example of a song that uses this tuning is Tsugaru Jongara Bushi.

=== Sansagari ===
Sansagari means "lowered three" or "lowered third", referring to tuning the shamisen to honchoushi and lowering the 3rd string (the string with the highest pitch) down a whole step, so that the instrument is tuned in fourths, e.g. C-F-B♭. An example of a song in this tuning is Tsugaru Sansagari.

Instead of having a set tuning, such as on a guitar (i.e. E, A, D, G, B, E) or a violin (i.e. G, D, A, E), the shamisen is tuned according to the register of the singer, or simply to the liking of the player. The shamisen player can tune the shamisen to whatever register desired, so long as the above conventions are followed.

== Musical notation ==
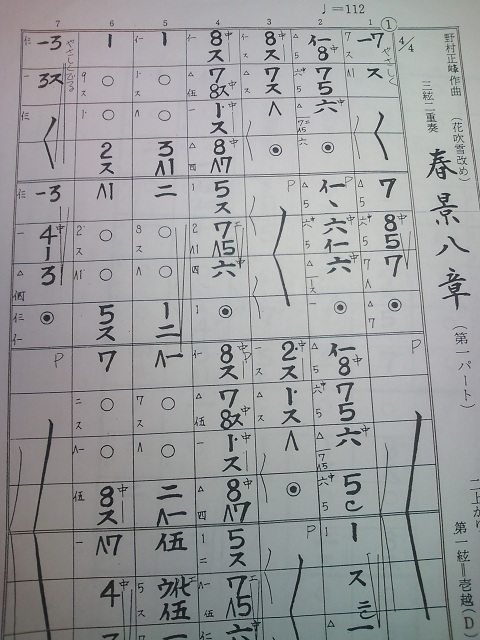
Vertical shamisen tablature, read from right to left. Nodes for the 3rd string are indicated by Arabic numerals, for the 2nd string by Chinese numerals, and for the 1st string by Chinese numerals preceded by イ.

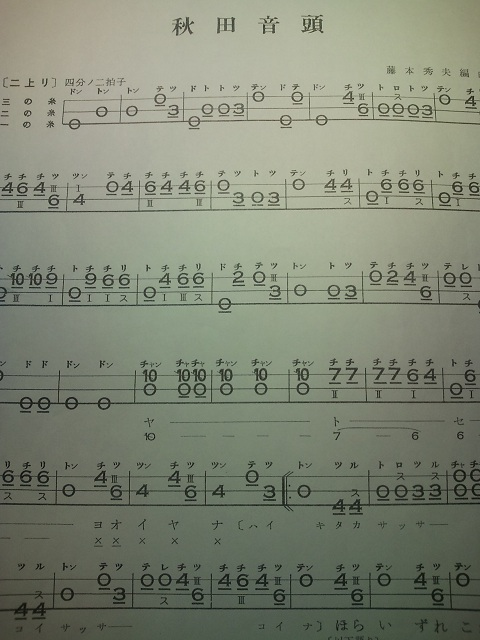
Horizontal shamisen tablature, read from left to right. Similar to guitar tablature, three horizontal lines represent the strings of the shamisen. Nodes are represented by Arabic numerals, and note subdivisions are indicated by lines under them.

Music for the shamisen can be written in Western music notation, but is more often written in tablature notation. While tunings might be similar across genres, the way in which the nodes on the neck of the instrument (called tsubo (壷) in Japanese) are named is not. As a consequence, tablature for each genre is written differently. For example, in the min'yo shamisen style, nodes on the shamisen are labeled from 0, the open string called "0". However, in the jiuta shamisen style, nodes are subdivided and named by octave, with "1" being the open string and first note in an octave, starting over at the next octave. The nodes are also labeled differently for tsugaru-style shamisen. To add to the confusion, sometimes nodes can be "sharped", and since the names of nodes and their positions are different for each genre, these will also vary. Consequently, students of one genre of shamisen will find it difficult to read tablature from other genres of shamisen, unless they are specially trained to read these kinds of tablatures.

Tablature can be written in traditional Japanese vertical right-to-left notation, or it can be written in Western style horizontal left-to-right notation, which resembles modern guitar tablature. In traditional vertical notation, Chinese characters and older symbols for dynamics are used, however notation from Western style music notation, such as Italian names for dynamics, time signature and the fermata have been imported. What tuning a work calls for is usually indicated on the tablature.

== History and genres ==
The Japanese shamisen originated from the Chinese sanxian (Chinese: 三弦). The sanxian was introduced through the Ryūkyū Kingdom (Okinawa) in the 16th century, where it developed into the Okinawan sanshin (三線), from which the shamisen ultimately derives. It is believed that the ancestor of the shamisen was introduced in the 16th century through the port city of Sakai, near Osaka.

The shamisen can be played solo or with other shamisen, in ensembles with other Japanese instruments, with singing such as nagauta, or as an accompaniment to drama, notably kabuki and bunraku. Both men and women traditionally played the shamisen.

The most famous and perhaps most demanding of the narrative styles is gidayū, named after Takemoto Gidayū (1651–1714), who was heavily involved in the bunraku puppet-theater tradition in Osaka. The gidayū shamisen and its plectrum are the largest of the shamisen family, and the singer-narrator is required to speak the roles of the play, as well as to sing all the commentaries on the action. The singer-narrator role is often so vocally taxing that the performers are changed halfway through a scene. There is little notated in the books (maruhon) of the tradition except the words and the names of certain appropriate generic shamisen responses. The shamisen player must know the entire work perfectly in order to respond effectively to the interpretations of the text by the singer-narrator. From the 19th century, female performers known as onna-jōruri or onna gidayū also carried on this concert tradition.

In the early part of the 20th century, blind musicians, including Shirakawa Gunpachirō (1909–1962), Takahashi Chikuzan (1910–1998), and sighted players such as Kida Rinshōei (1911–1979), evolved a new style of playing, based on traditional folk songs (min'yō) but involving much improvisation and flashy fingerwork. This style – now known as tsugaru-jamisen, after the home region of this style in the north of Honshū – continues to be relatively popular in Japan. The virtuosic tsugaru-jamisen style is sometimes compared to bluegrass banjo.

kouta (小唄) is a style of shamisen historically developed by and mostly performed by geisha and maiko. Its name literally means "little song", which contrasts with the musical genre of nagauta found in bunraku and kabuki; though both maiko and geisha training to play the shamisen will also learn naguata and will occasionally perform nagauta at banquets, the vast majority of musical performances seen at the parties and events they attend are kouta.

Jiuta (地唄, literally "regional song") is a more classical style of shamisen music.

=== Shamisen in non-traditional genres ===
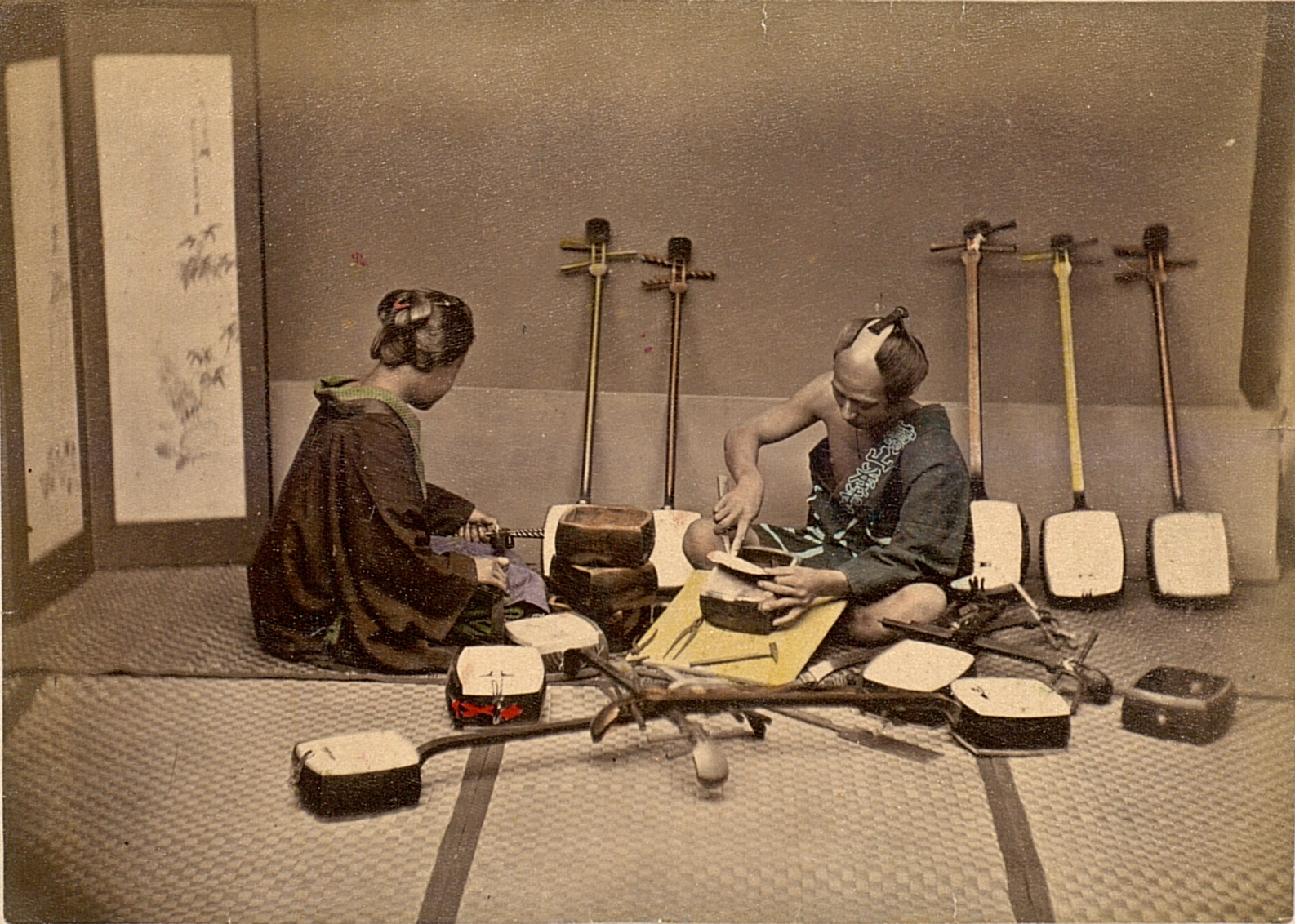
Shamisen maker with a customer, 1909

- Takeshi Terauchi & Bunnys utilized shamisen played by Michiya Mihashi in combo with their instrumental rock group on their single "Tsugaru Jongara Bushi" with "Dark Eyes".
- Japanese rock musician Miyavi has also played the shamisen on various occasions, incorporating its use in albums and during concerts (e.g. during the debut live of superband S.K.I.N concert at the 2007 Anime Expo convention at Long Beach, California on June 29, 2007).
- American tsugaru-jamisen player and guitarist Kevin Kmetz leads a rock band called God of Shamisen, which is based in Santa Cruz, California, and also plays the instrument with the band Estradasphere.
- Japanese traditional and jazz musician Hiromitsu Agatsuma incorporates a diverse mix of genres into his music. He arranged several jazz standards and other famous western songs for the shamisen on his album Agatsuma Plays Standards in 2008. His previous recordings, such as Beyond from 2004, displayed traditional Japanese styles mixed with funk, techno and rock.
- Noriko Tadano is a tsugaru shamisen player born and raised in Japan, who now resides in Australia. She has collaborated with a wide variety of musicians from genres such as blues, jazz, folk, experimental and electronic music. Tadano has performed in collaborations at a number of world festivals. Tadano performed in the blues duo 'George & Noriko' on season 6 of Australia's Got Talent, making it to the finals.
- Wagakki Band is a Japanese folk-rock fusion band that features various traditional Japanese instruments including the shamisen, played by Beni Ninagawa.
- Japanese metal group Ryujin has used the shamisen in some of their songs.
- Takeharu Kunimoto was a shamisen player who performed and recorded bluegrass music in addition to traditional Japanese music.

== See also ==
- Biwa
- Gagaku
- Kokyū
- Sankyoku
- Sanshin
- Sanxian
- Tsugaru-jamisen

== Bibliography ==
- "The Shamisen: Tradition and Diversity – BRILL". 13 December 2010. Archived from the original on 2010-12-13.
