= Yukio Tanaka (biwa) =

Japanese biwa player (born 1948)

Yukio Tanaka (田中 之雄, Tanaka Yukio, born 1948) is a Japanese biwa player.

He studied under the satsuma biwa master Kinshi Tsuruta, whose status he inherited as a leading figure of Japanese traditional music. His honours include First Prize at the Japanese Biwa Competition, the Minister of Education, Science and Culture Prize and the Japanese Broadcasting Corporation (NHK) Prize.

Tanaka has released numerous CDs and recordings for films. He performs internationally both as soloist and with orchestras, including the Staatskapelle Berlin, the Tokyo Philharmonic Orchestra, the Houston Symphony Orchestra, the RAI Symphony Orchestra, and the Hespèrion XXI, under the baton of conductors such as Kent Nagano, Christoph Eschenbach and Jordi Savall. He is a professor at the Tokyo College of Music and a director of the Japan Biwa Association.

== Discography ==
- Silenziosa Luna ALM Records ALCD-76 (2008)
