= Kouta (music) =

Genre of Japanese folk music

Kouta (小唄, lit. 'little songs') is a type of traditional Japanese music that originated in the red-light districts of Edo period (1603–1868) Japan, before developing further and experiencing wider popularity in the geisha districts that succeeded many red-light districts. Originally popularised by geisha as an alternative to nagauta ('long songs'), kouta are typically no longer than 3 minutes in length, are played on the shamisen, and are generally accompanied by singing and traditional dance.

== History ==
The Japanese term kouta has been used for a number of inconsistent musical styles throughout Japanese history, though the term is used in the modern day exclusively to refer to the style of short, informal songs first developed in the late Edo period (1603–1867) and popularised in the early Meiji period (1868–1912).

During the Heian period, the term kouta was broadly applied to court songs performed by women such as yūjo ('woman of pleasure') and shirabyōshi. This term was used in contrast to the ōuta ('large songs') performed by male court musicians. In later centuries, compilations of short, lyrical songs known as kouta were published; the first of these, entitled Kanginshū, was published in 1518.

The term kouta was also used in Noh theatre, as well as accompanying early forms of kabuki performance. The shamisen, which had been introduced to Japan in 1600, had begun to accompany kouta played for kabuki by 1650. By 1740, this style of music used for kabuki – referred to broadly as odori uta ('dance music') – had evolved into the nagauta style, short songs being too short to carry the now-longer dances of theatrical performances.

The style of kouta performed in the present day originated in the late Edo period as short, improvised songs created by musicians already versed in the katarimono ('narrative shamisen music') styles of shamisen music, including hauta ('short songs'). The first modern kouta piece is said to have been composed in 1855 by jōruri puppet theatre singer Kiyomoto Oyō (1840–1901), and was titled Chiru wa Uki ('Those that fall float'). Performing a hauta piece in the kiyomoto style at a faster tempo, Oyō would go on to compose a number of early kouta, typically through borrowing lyrics from kamigata hauta ('short songs from Kamigata'), edo hauta ('short songs from Edo') and utazawa – a style of shamisen music characterised as "classy" and "graceful", itself having resulted from governmental reforms aimed at suppressing the excessive erotic expression of late 17th century kouta.

The conflation of shamisen genres in kouta became a key feature of the style, with a number of early kouta having separate versions in both hauta and utazawa. In the early Meiji period, kouta were often creatively composed by a number of kiyomoto performers, who, having inserted hauta pieces into their kiyomoto performances, later extracted these sections to be performed alone, composing new pieces in this style with the use of imagery taken from the pleasure quarters. Kouta, needing few performers and taking under three minutes to perform, eventually grew into a popular musical tradition of its own right in the Meiji period, forming an independent genre.

=== Geisha ===
During the 18th century, kouta had grown to become emblematic of the rising merchant (chōnin) classes of Japan; by the end of the Edo period, these classes had come to favour geisha as the most fashionable female companions, in contrast to the beginning of the Edo period, where courtesans had been considered fashionable. These geisha sang kouta at parties for guests, and became the centre of the popularity of kouta, with all the early founders of modern kouta having been geisha from Tokyo. Beginning in the Meiji period, a number of geisha left the profession entirely to teach kouta instead, both to geisha and members of the general public. These geisha would later go on to become the first kouta iemoto in the early 20th century:

- Kotama (1876–1941), kouta name Hori Kotama: Kotama, who became the first kouta iemoto in 1917, was formerly a geisha in Shinbashi and a student of Yokayama Saki. Kotama founded a keiko ya in 1916, and founded the Hori ryū the following year, acting as the first kouta iemoto.
- Koteru, kouta name Tamura Teru: The geisha Koteru of Nihonbashi established the Tamura ryū in 1920, and assumed name Tamura Teru as its iemoto in the same year.
- O-yū, kouta name Yoshimura Yū: The geisha O-yū of Shinbashi founded the Yoshimura ryū in 1922, assuming the name Yoshimura Yū as its iemoto.
- Kouta Kōbei: Kōbei became a kouta iemoto in 1923
- Kochō, kouta name Tade Kochō: Kochō, a geisha in Yanagibashi, became a kouta iemoto in 1927, assuming the iemoto name Tade Kochō and founding the Tade ryū
- Tsurusuke, kouta name Kasuga Toyo: Asakusa geisha Tsurusuke became a kouta iemoto in 1930, and founded the Kasuga ryū in the same year.

In 1917, the first school for teaching kouta opened in Tokyo. Students of kouta extended from businessmen, artists, and politicians to office women and housewives. The original three kouta schools of kouta correspond to three of the most well-known hanamachi of Tokyo in the Meiji period: the Tamura-ha ryū was founded by Nihonbashi geisha Koteru, who later became iemoto Tamura Teru; the Tade-ha ryū was founded by Yanagibashi geisha Kochō, who became iemoto Tade Kochō; and the Kasuga-ha ryū was founded by Asakusa geisha Tsurusuke, who became iemoto Kasuga Toyo.

The resulting spread of kouta throughout the general population, as well as the pleasure quarters, was as a direct result of these geisha leaving the profession to teach kouta full-time. Kouta were considered easy and relatively cheap to learn in comparison to other traditional forms of music, and could be composed quickly, with little need of others to perform fully.

By the early 20th century, kouta had also grown to become a highly-varied music genre, and had long been a key aspect of the entertainment repertoire of geisha, with many kouta lyrics taking direct inspiration from the fashionable entertainment districts where they entertained. By this time, geisha either worked in districts separate from those of courtesans, or outnumbered them significantly within their district. Though the term karyūkai (花柳界, the 'flower and willow world') ostensibly referred to both courtesans and geisha living in the same district, courtesans had become a dying breed, and had not been viewed as the height of fashion and female companionship since the early Edo period.

In 1915, the English composer Gustav Holst drew upon Gion Kouta for his Japanese Suite Op.33. The melody was whistled to him by Japanese dancer Michio Itō, during the collaborative project.

By the late 1940s and early 1950s, the sheer number of kouta students and teachers resulted in a 'kouta boom' (kouta būmu); in Tokyo, as many as over 200 kouta teachers were said to be practicing by 1952, each with 50–60 students, and over 2,000 new kouta pieces were composed. This trend continued into the later 1950s, with a number of ryū breaking away from larger kouta schools, resulting in 180 iemoto and their corresponding schools by 1972. In 2008, the number of ryū was estimated to be over 200.

In the present day, the parties and performances of geisha are where the majority of kouta performances are held. Some kouta are directly linked to the karyūkai, with one famous song, the Gion kouta, directly referencing the appearance of the apprentice geisha found in the city's hanamachi of Gion.

== Style ==
Kouta, alongside nagauta, fall into the utaimono category ('lyrical shamisen music' – vocalised music pieces based on native folk poetry) of the traditional shamisen repertoire, as opposed to the katarimono styles that kouta originated from. Most kouta can be sung in under five minutes, with even the longest songs taking no longer than four minutes to sing. As with most traditional shamisen music, though kouta music notation does exist, most are learned by ear without notation.

The themes and lyrical content of kouta vary widely, though they are considered to be more sentimental in content and style than longer ballads. Dalby (2000) notes that "many have a common structure in first sketching a natural scene, followed by a middle or pivot phrase which connects the description of nature to the last section, which talks of some human emotion. This technique is one commonly found in traditional poetry such as waka and haiku."

Despite their poetic nature, in the Edo period, kouta, like geisha and the shamisen, were considered to be a relatively low-class form of entertainment, regardless of their wide popularity. Though their lyrics are often romantic and sometimes humorous, kouta with refined themes of aestheticism, especially those focused on the theme of ukiyo, can also be found.

== Schools of kouta study ==
A group of kouta teachers collectively make up a ha (school); schools of a city or metropolitan area form an association (rengōkai). Associations organise recitals in Western-style concert halls twice a year.

In the present day, kouta are still studied by geisha, for whom kouta form an intrinsic part of their working lives, as well as wealthy housewives and high-level businessmen, who make take lessons in kouta for enjoyment, or to further their own skills to show off at parties. In previous decades, it was necessary for all geisha to learn and master, to some degree, kouta and the shamisen as part of their work; in the present day, only those who decide to specialise in the musical style and playing the shamisen pursue study of kouta for any considerable length of time, though geisha who specialise in other arts, such as traditional dance, will still study kouta to aid in their studies of dance and performance.

== See also ==
- Nagauta
- Shamisen
  - Sanshin, the predecessor of the shamisen and a traditional instrument in Okinawa
  - Sanxian, the predecessor of the sanshin
- Geisha
