= Sawari =

Buzzing sound produced by traditional Japanese string instruments

In traditional Japanese music, sawari (さわり) is the name of a buzzy sound quality, or timbre, that is often found in and/or expected of certain traditional stringed instruments.

In the shamisen, for example, the sound quality is produced by the first, or lowest string, which is purposely laid lower than the rest of the strings at the nut of the instrument. This placement of the string allows the string not only to have a characteristic buzzy timbre, but it also allows it to resonate sympathetically when the other strings are plucked. In modern versions of the instrument, the neck of the shamisen is equipped with an adjustment device that allows the player to raise or lower the 1st string at will, thereby adjusting the quality of the "sawari." The device itself is often called "sawari" by shamisen players and makers.

The biwa, particularly the satsuma biwa is another Japanese instrument which is known for its sawari. The make of the instrument is such that the strings are stopped by pulling them between frets that are raised centimeters from the neck of the instrument, allowing the player to create the desired sawari effect at each fret. Sawari was first found in the biwa, and this quality was a desirable trait that biwa players wanted to reproduce in the shamisen. Thus, players began to use oversized plectrums for the shamisen instead of the fingers, and the 1st string was purposely laid lower at the nut of the instrument so that it purposely vibrated against the wood of the instrument, producing the desired buzzing sound quality.

Japanese composer Toru Takemitsu has written that the term sawari may signify both "to touch" and "obstacle," and suggests that the sawari may be taken as "an intentional inconvenience that creates a part of the expressiveness of the sound."

== See also ==
- Jivari
