= Jivari =

Buzzing sound made by classical Indian string instruments

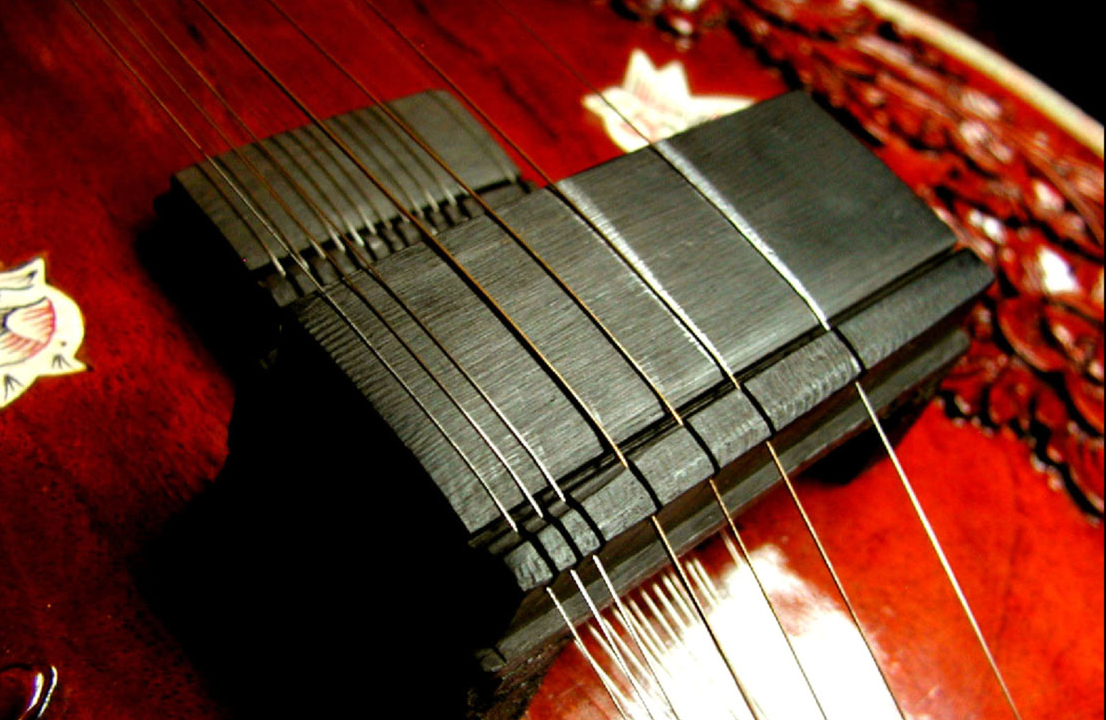
The Javari of a sitar, made from ebony, showing graphite marks from the first two strings

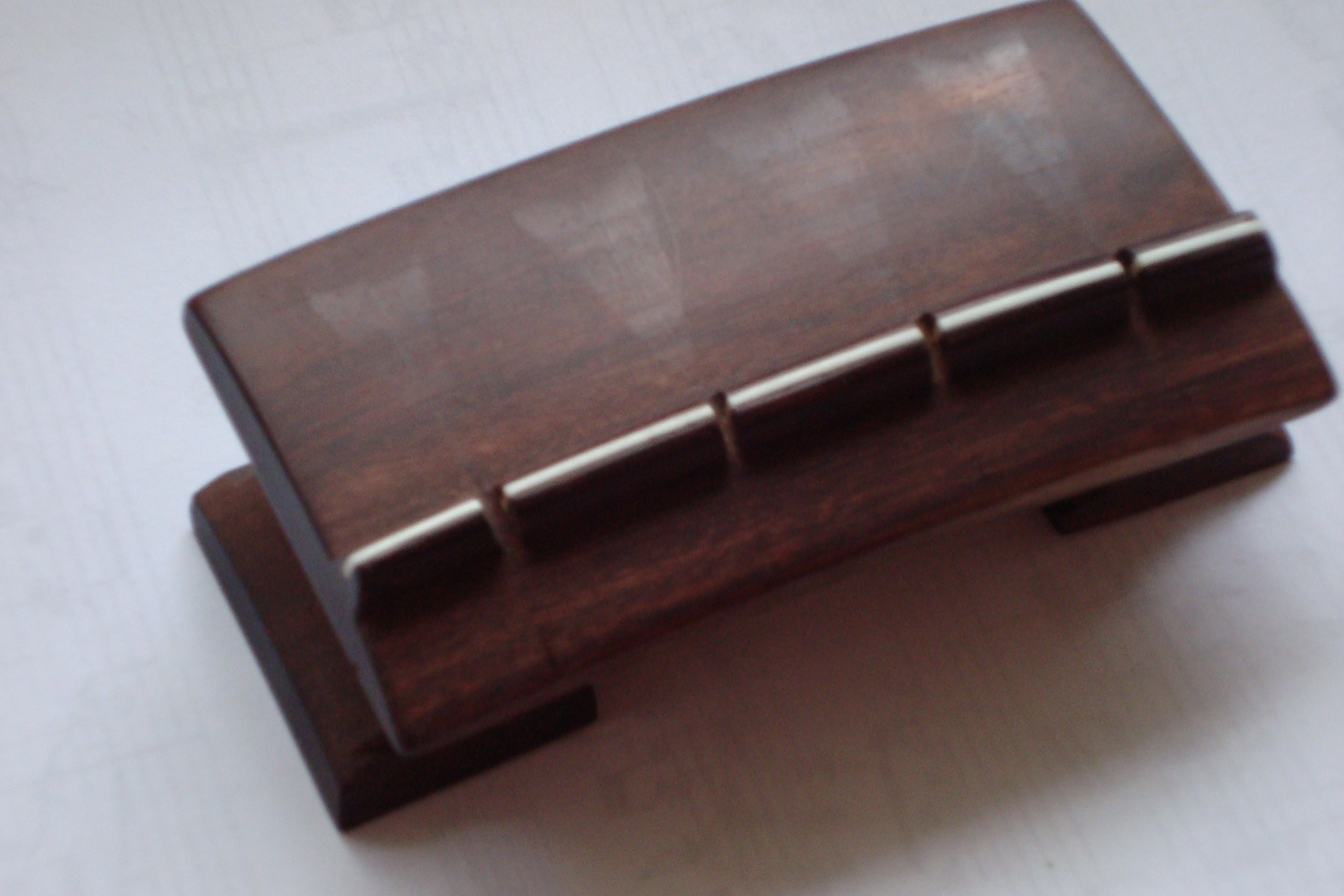
Top view of a rosewood tambura bridge. Notice the marks left by the strings as the javari-maker assures that the contact-lines on the surface of the bridge are continuous and even. As a further test strings are pulled sideways and lengthwise in order to rub the bridge with the string, to better judge the quality of the surface, as unevenness in the surface shows clearly as a gap.

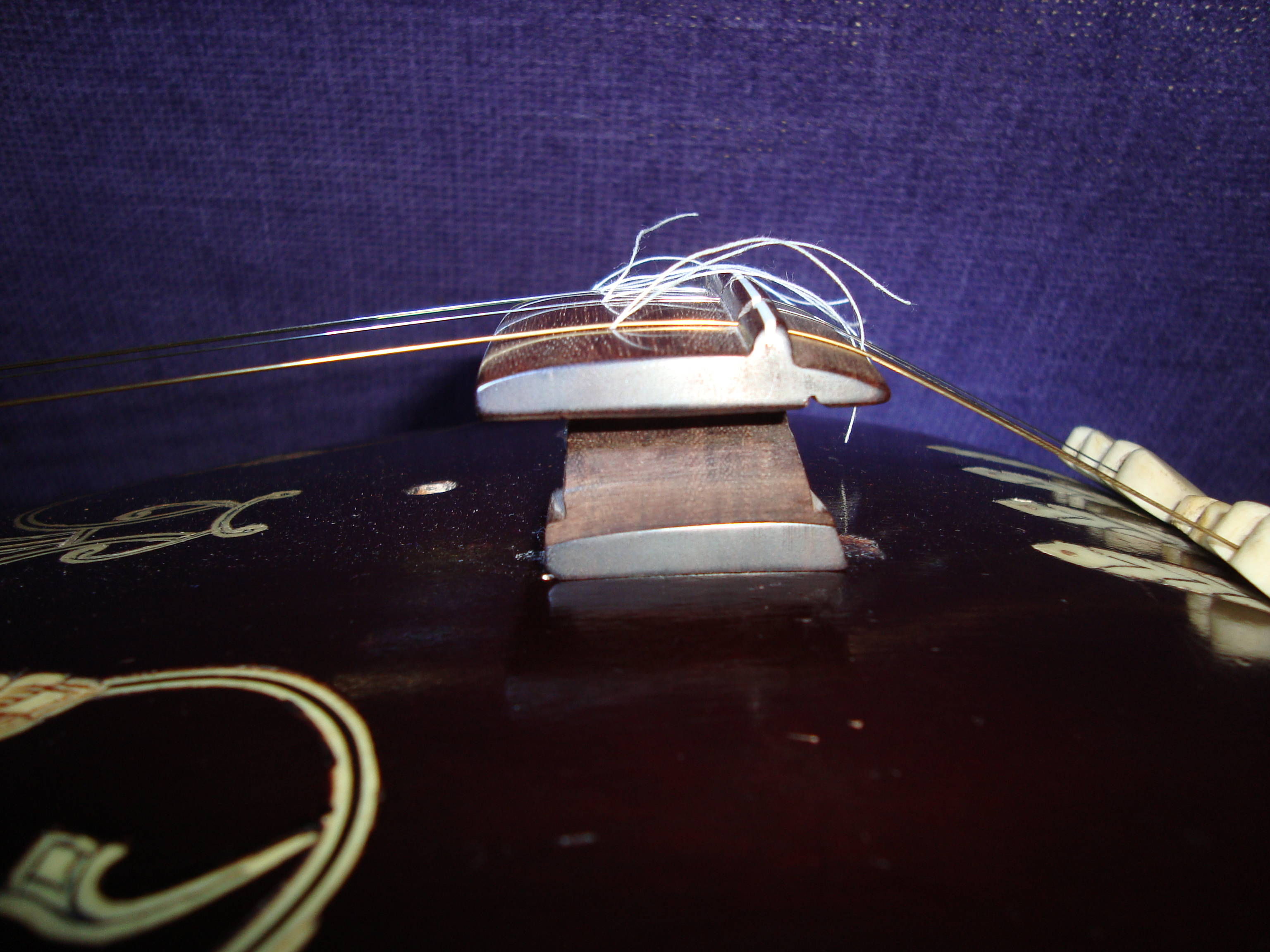
Side view of a Tanjore-style rosewood tanpura bridge with cotton threads adjusted for full resonance.

In Indian classical music, javārī (Note: alternatively transliterated as joārī, juvārī, jvārī; jawārī, jowārī, joyārī, juwārī, and jwārī.) (Hindi: जवारी) refers to the overtone-rich "buzzing" sound characteristic of classical Indian string instruments such as the tanpura, sitar, surbahar, rudra veena and Sarasvati veena. Javari can refer to the acoustic phenomenon itself, or to the meticulously carved bone, ivory or wooden bridges that support the strings on the sounding board and produce this particular effect. Historically, the concept of a Jiwari bridge was being applied to the Mesopotamian lyres 4500 years ago. (see link below). A similar sort of bridge is used on traditional Ethiopian lyres, as well as on the ancient Greek kithara, and the "bray pins" of some early European harps operated on the same principle. A similar sound effect, called sawari, is used on some traditional Japanese instruments as well.

Under the strings of tanpuras, which are unfretted (unstopped), and occasionally under those bass drone strings of sitars and surbahars which are seldom fretted, cotton threads are placed on the javari bridge to control the exact position of the node and its height above the curved surface, in order to more precisely refine the sound of javari. These cotton threads are known in Hindi as jīvā, meaning "life" and referring to the brighter tone heard from the plucked string once the thread has been slid into the correct position. This process is called "adjusting the javari". After a substantial time of playing, the surface directly under the string will wear out through the erosive impact of the strings. The sound will become thin and sharp and tuning also becomes a problem. Then a skilled, experienced craftsman needs to redress and polish the surface, which is called "doing the javari" ("'Javārī Sāf Karnā' or "Cleaning the Javārī'"). (See external link for a video series on how to do jawari).

The rich and very much 'alive' resonant sound requires great sensitivity and experience in the tuning process. In the actual tuning, the fundamentals are of lesser interest as attention is drawn to the sustained harmonics that should be clearly audible, particularly the octaves, fifths, major thirds and minor sevenths of the (fundamental) tone of the string. The actual tuning is done on three levels: firstly by means of the large pegs, secondly, by carefully shifting tuning-beads for micro-tuning and thirdly, on a tanpura, by even more careful shifting of the cotton threads that pass between the strings and the bridge, somewhat before the zenith of its curve.

== Effect ==
Typical of javari on an instrument with preferably long strings, is that on the soundboard the strings run over a wide bridge with a very flat parabolic curve. The curvature of the bridge has been made in a precise relation to the optimum level of playing, or more exact, a precise amplitude of each string. Any string, given length, density, pitch and tension, wants to be plucked within the limits of its elasticity, and so vibrate harmoniously with a steady pitch. When a string of a tanpura is plucked properly, it produces a tone with a certain amplitude that will slowly decrease as the tone fades out. In this gradual process, the string, moving up and down according to its frequency, will make a periodic grazing contact with the curved surface of the bridge. The exact grazing-spot will gradually shift up the sloping surface, as a function of the decreasing amplitude, finally dissolving into the rest-position of the open string. In this complex dynamic sonation process, the shifting grazing will touch upon micro-nodes on the string, exciting a wide range of harmonics in a sweeping mode. The desired effect is that of a cascading row of harmonics in a rainbow of sound. As an analogy, a properly shaped and adjusted javari is similar to the refraction of white light through a prism. When the prism is of good proportions and quality and used properly, the phenomenon should produce itself. "The voice of an artist which is marked by a rich sound resembling that produced by two consonants played together, is often loosely known to have Javārī in it, although such use is arbitrary."

== Construction ==
The javari of a tanpura is in a way fine-tuned with a cotton thread under the string. Both the thread itself and its function is called 'jiva'. The jiva lifts the string by its diameter off the bridge and gives the necessary clearance and adjustability. By carefully shifting the jiva the sequence of the shifting grazing on the parabolic surface of the bridge becomes 'tuneable' within limits. For each string there should be a spot relative to the curve of the bridge where optimum sound quality is found. Within the area of optimum resonance and sustain, a little play should be available for further fine-tuning, in which the jiva can hardly be seen to move. Staying with optics, shifting the jiva would be similar to using the manual fine focus on a camera. Experienced 'javari-makers' will agree that the 'javari' has to be made specific to certain string lengths, gauges and pitches and certain amplitudes. The curvature of the bridge of the main strings of a sitar will be different from that of the smaller and lower bridge in front of the main bridge, which carries the sympathetic resonance-strings (tarafs). As this choir of thinner and shorter strings is excited solely by the sympathetic resonance with the tones played on the main strings, the general amplitude is smaller, so accordingly the curvature will be flatter. The making of a perfectly sounding javari for any instrument requires a very high degree of skill and expertise. Tanpuras are the only instruments that are always used with jiva-threads, except the octave-tamburis. Sitar, Rudra Veena, Sarasvati Veena, all have parabolic wide javari bridges for the main playing strings. Sarod and Sarangi have some of their sympathetic resonance strings (tarafs) on small, flat javari-bridges similar to that of the sitar. The javari of a sitar will be made according to the wishes of the player, either 'open',('khula') with a bright sounding javari-effect, or 'closed' ('band') with a relatively more plain tone, or something in between ('ghol'). The choice depends on the preference of the sitar-player and on the adapted playing style.
