= Biwa =

Japanese short necked lute

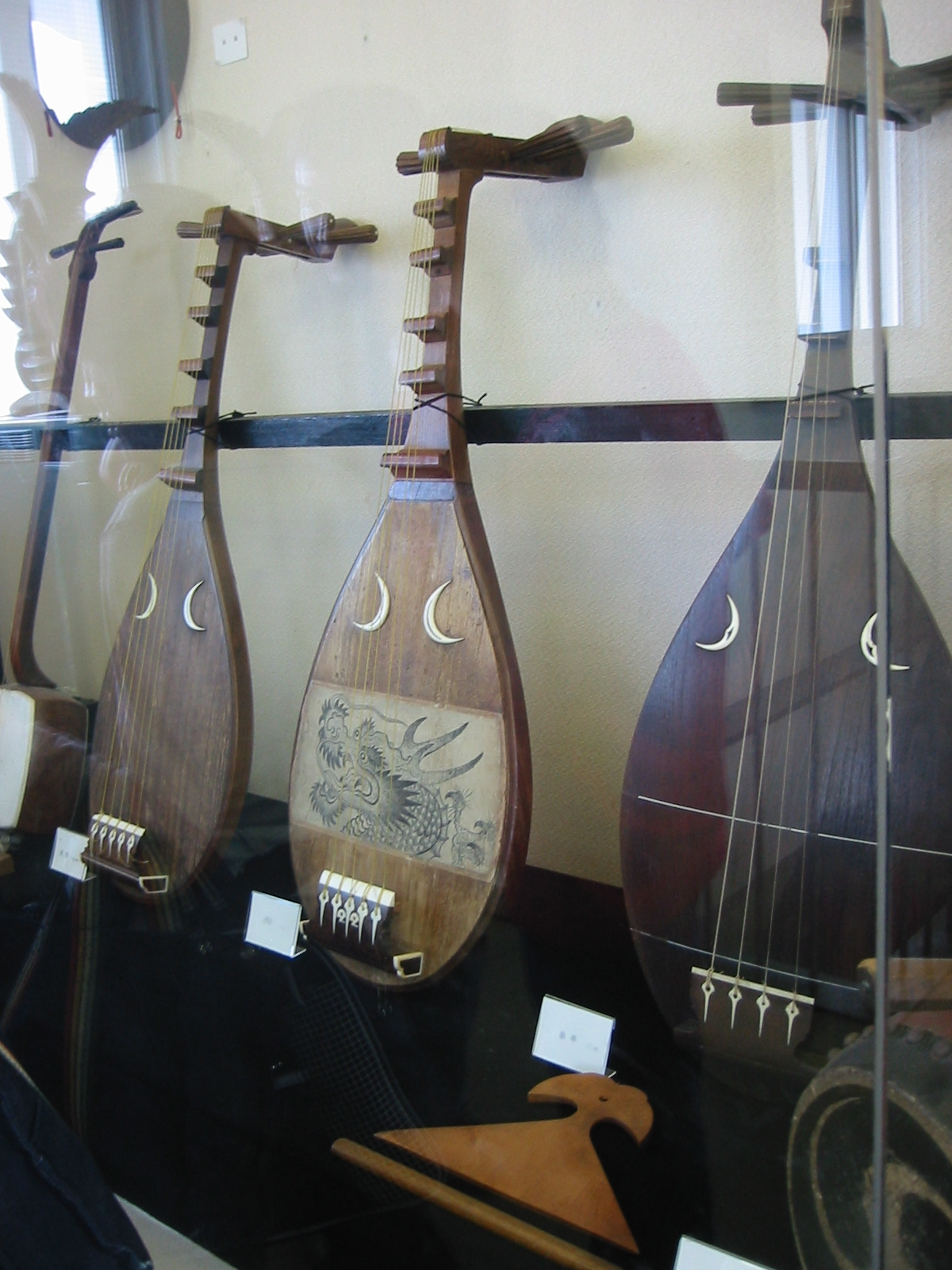
- A selection of biwa in a Japanese museum
- Classification: Necked bowl lutes; String instruments

Related instruments
- Angélique; Archlute; Balalaika; Banjo; Barbat; Baglamadaki; Bağlama; Bipa; Bouzouki; Charango; Chitarra Italiana; Daguangxian; Đàn tỳ bà; Dombra; Domra; Dutar; Electric pipa; Irish bouzouki; Liuqin; Lute; Mandocello; Mandola; Mandolin; Oud; Pandura; Pipa; Rubab; Setar; Sitar; Surbahar; Tambouras; Tanbur; Tanbur (Turkish); Tembûr; Theorbo; Tiqin; Topshur; Veena

The biwa (Japanese: 琵琶) is a Japanese short-necked wooden lute traditionally used in narrative storytelling. The biwa is a plucked string instrument that first gained popularity in China before spreading throughout East Asia, eventually reaching Japan sometime during the Nara period (710–794).

Typically 60 centimetres (24 in) to 106 centimetres (42 in) in length, the instrument is constructed of a water drop–shaped body with a short neck, typically with four (though sometimes five) strings.

In Japan, the biwa is generally played with a bachi instead of the fingers, and is often used to play gagaku. One of the biwa's most famous uses is for reciting The Tale of the Heike, from the Kamakura period (1185–1333).

In previous centuries, the predominant biwa musicians would have been blind monks (琵琶法師, biwa hōshi), who used the biwa as musical accompaniment when reading scriptural texts.

The biwa's Chinese predecessor was the pipa (琵琶), which arrived in Japan in two forms; following its introduction to Japan, varieties of the biwa quadrupled. Guilds supporting biwa players, particularly the biwa hōshi, helped proliferate biwa musical development for hundreds of years. Biwa hōshi performances overlapped with performances by other biwa players many years before heikyoku (平曲, The Tale of the Heike), and continues to this day. This overlap resulted in a rapid evolution of the biwa and its usage and made it one of the most popular instruments in Japan.

In spite of its popularity, the Ōnin War and subsequent Warring States Period disrupted biwa teaching and decreased the number of proficient users. With the abolition of Todo in the Meiji period, biwa players lost their patronage.

By the late 1940s, the biwa, a thoroughly Japanese tradition, was nearly completely abandoned for Western instruments. However, thanks to collaborative efforts by Japanese musicians, interest in the biwa is being revived. Japanese and foreign musicians alike have begun embracing traditional Japanese instruments, particularly the biwa, in their compositions.

While blind biwa singers no longer dominate the biwa, many performers continue to use the instrument in traditional and modern ways.

== History ==
The biwa arrived in Japan in the 7th century, having evolved from the Chinese bent-neck pipa (曲項琵琶; quxiang pipa), while the pipa itself was derived from similar instruments in West Asia. This type of biwa, known as the gaku-biwa, was later used in gagaku ensembles and became the most commonly known type. However, another variant of the biwa – known as the mōsō-biwa or the kōjin-biwa – also found its way to Japan, first appearing in the Kyushu region. Though its origins are unclear, this thinner variant of the biwa was used in ceremonies and religious rites.

The biwa became known as an instrument commonly played at the Japanese Imperial court, where biwa players, known as biwa hōshi, found employment and patronage. However, following the collapse of the Ritsuryō state, biwa hōshi employed at the court were faced with the court's reconstruction and sought asylum in Buddhist temples. There, they assumed the role of Buddhist monks and encountered the mōsō-biwa. Seeing its relative convenience and portability, the monks combined these features with their large and heavy gaku-biwa to create the heike-biwa, which, as indicated by its namesake, was used primarily for recitations of The Tale of the Heike.

Through the next several centuries, players of both traditions intersected frequently and developed new music styles and new instruments. By the Kamakura period (1185–1333), the heike-biwa had emerged as a more popular instrument, a cross between both the gaku-biwa and mōsō-biwa, retaining the rounded shape of the gaku-biwa and played with a large plectrum like the mōsō-biwa. The heike-biwa, smaller than the mōsō-biwa, was used for similar purposes.

While the modern satsuma-biwa and chikuzen-biwa both originated from the mōsō-biwa, the satsuma-biwa was used for moral and mental training by samurai of the Satsuma Domain during the Warring States period, and later for general performances. The chikuzen-biwa was used by Buddhist monks visiting private residences to perform memorial services, not only for Buddhist rites, but also to accompany the telling of stories and news.

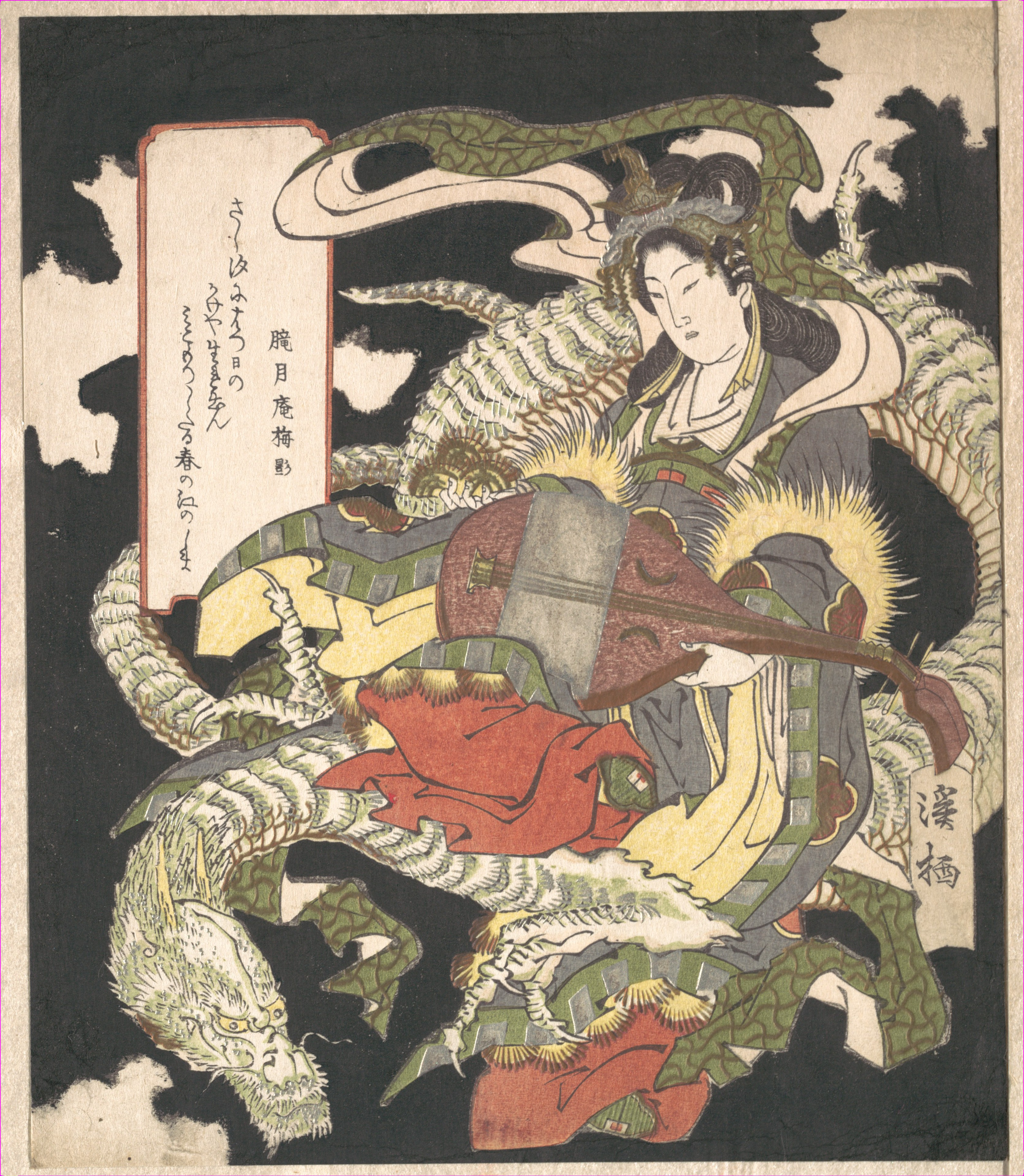
Benzaiten (Goddess of Music and Good Fortune) playing a biwa, 1832 woodblock print (surimono)

Though formerly popular, little was written about the performance and practice of the biwa from roughly the 16th century to the mid-19th century. What is known is that three main streams of biwa practice emerged during this time: zato (the lowest level of the state-controlled guild of blind biwa players), shifu (samurai style), and chofu (urban style). These styles emphasized biwa-uta (琵琶歌) – vocalisation with biwa accompaniment – and formed the foundation for edo-uta (江戸歌) styles of playing, such as shinnai and kota.

From these styles also emerged the two principal survivors of the biwa tradition: satsuma-biwa and chikuzen-biwa. From roughly the Meiji period (1868–1912) until the Pacific War, the satsuma-biwa and chikuzen-biwa were popular across Japan, and, at the beginning of the Shōwa period (1925–1989), the nishiki-biwa was created and gained popularity. Of the remaining post-war biwa traditions, only higo-biwa remains a style almost solely performed by blind persons. The higo-biwa is closely related to the heike-biwa and, similarly, relies on an oral narrative tradition focusing on wars and legends.

By the middle of the Meiji period, improvements had been made to the instruments and easily understandable songs were composed in quantity. In the beginning of the Taishō period (1912–1926), the satsuma-biwa was modified into the nishiki-biwa, which became popular among female players at the time. With this, the biwa entered a period of popularity, with songs reflecting not just The Tale of the Heike, but also the Sino-Japanese War and the Russo-Japanese War, with songs such as Takeo Hirose, Hitachimaru and Hill 203 gaining popularity.

However, the playing of the biwa nearly became extinct during the Meiji period following the introduction of Western music and instruments, until players such as Tsuruta Kinshi and others revitalized the genre with modern playing styles and collaborations with Western composers.

A woman playing a five fret biwa, 2022

== Types ==
There are more than seven types of biwa, characterised by number of strings, sounds it could produce, the type of plectrum, and their use. As the biwa does not play in tempered tuning, pitches are approximated to the nearest note.

=== Classic biwa ===
==== Gagaku-biwa ====
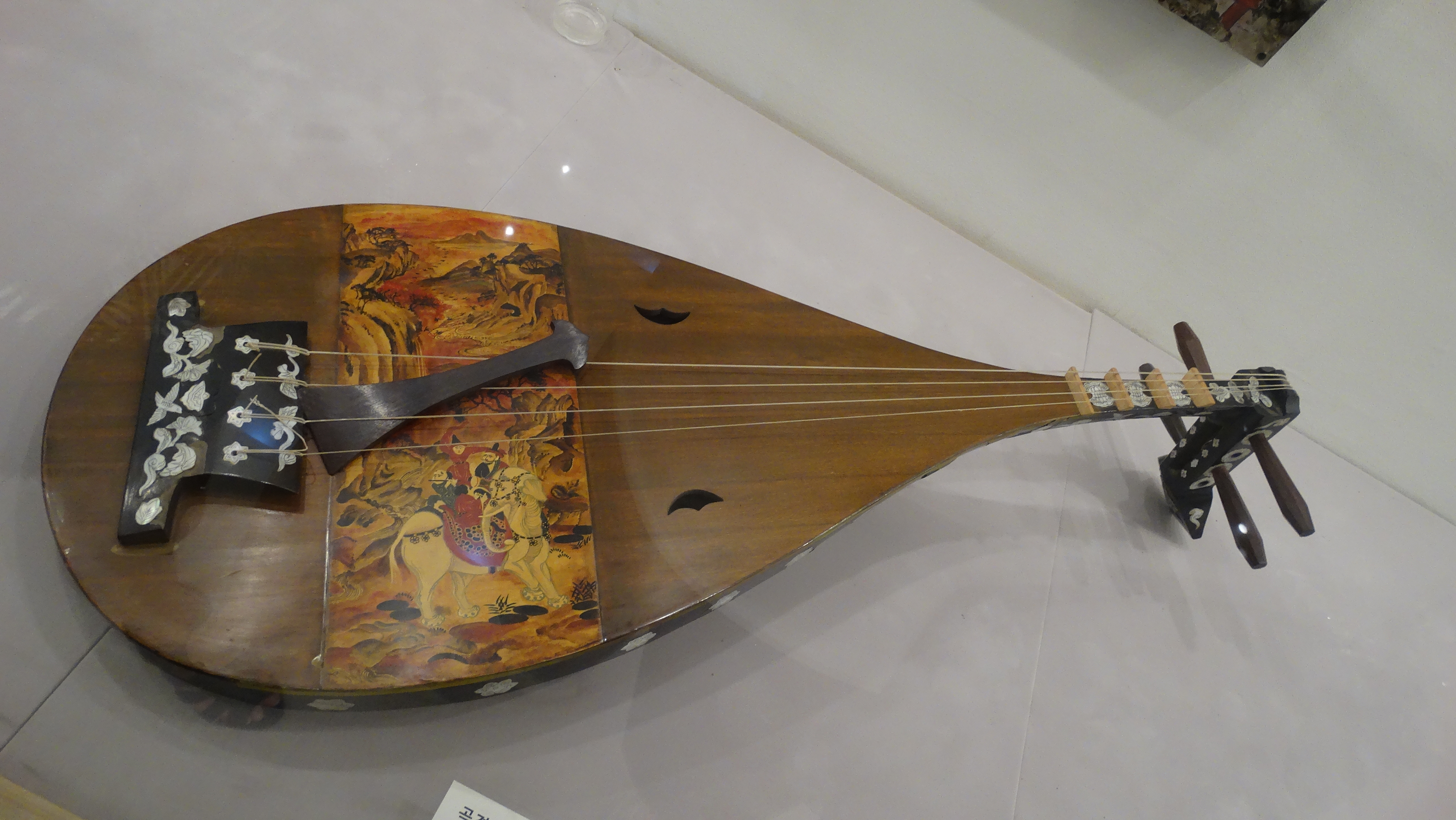
Gakubiwa

The gagaku biwa (雅楽琵琶), a large and heavy biwa with four strings and four frets, is used exclusively for gagaku. It produces distinctive ichikotsuchō (壱越調) and hyōjō (平調). Its plectrum is small and thin, often rounded, and made from a hard material such as boxwood or ivory. It is not used to accompany singing. Like the heike-biwa, it is played held on its side, similar to a guitar, with the player sitting cross-legged. In gagaku, it is known as the gaku-biwa (楽琵琶).

==== Gogen-biwa ====
The gogen-biwa (五絃琵琶, lit. 'five-stringed biwa'), a Tang variant of biwa, can be seen in paintings of court orchestras and was used in the context of gagaku; however, it was removed with the reforms and standardization made to the court orchestra during the late 10th century. It is assumed that the performance traditions died out by the 10th or 11th century (William P. Malm). This instrument also disappeared in the Chinese court orchestras. Recently, this instrument, much like the konghou harp, has been revived for historically informed performances and historical reconstructions. Not to be confused with the five-stringed variants of modern biwa, such as chikuzen-biwa.

==== Mōso-biwa ====
The mōsō-biwa (盲僧琵琶), a biwa with four strings, is used to play Buddhist mantras and songs. It is similar in shape to the chikuzen-biwa, but with a much more narrow body. Its plectrum varies in both size and materials. The four fret type is tuned to E, B, E and A, and the five fret type is tuned to B, e, f♯ and f♯. The six fret type is tuned to B♭, E♭, B♭ and b♭.

=== Middle and Edo biwa ===
==== Heike-biwa ====
The heike-biwa (平家琵琶), a biwa with four strings and five frets, is used to play The Tale of the Heike. Its plectrum is slightly larger than that of the gagaku-biwa, but the instrument itself is much smaller, comparable to a chikuzen-biwa in size. It was originally used by traveling biwa minstrels, and its small size lent it to indoor play and improved portability. Its tuning is A, c, e, a or A, c-sharp, e, a.

==== Satsuma-biwa ====
The satsuma-biwa (薩摩琵琶), a biwa with four strings and four frets, was popularized during the Edo period in Satsuma Province (present-day Kagoshima) by Shimazu Tadayoshi. Modern biwa used for contemporary compositions often have five or more frets, and some have a doubled fourth string. The frets of the satsuma-biwa are raised 4 centimetres (1.6 in) from the neck allowing notes to be bent several steps higher, each one producing the instrument's characteristic sawari, or buzzing drone. Its boxwood plectrum is much wider than others, often reaching widths of 25 cm (9.8 in) or more. Its size and construction influences the sound of the instrument as the curved body is often struck percussively with the plectrum during play.

The satsuma-biwa is traditionally made from Japanese mulberry, although other hard woods such as Japanese zelkova are sometimes used in its construction. Due to the slow growth of the Japanese mulberry, the wood must be taken from a tree at least 120 years old and dried for 10 years before construction can begin.

The strings are made of wound silk. Its tuning is A, E, A, B, for traditional biwa, G, G, c, g, or G, G, d, g for contemporary compositions, among other tunings, but these are only examples as the instrument is tuned to match the key of the player's voice. The first and second strings are generally tuned to the same note, with the 4th (or doubled 4th) string is tuned one octave higher.

The most eminent 20th century satsuma-biwa performer was Tsuruta Kinshi, who developed her own version of the instrument, which she called the tsuruta-biwa. This biwa often has five strings (although it is essentially a 4-string instrument as the 5th string is a doubled 4th that are always played together) and five or more frets, and the construction of the tuning head and frets vary slightly. Ueda Junko and Tanaka Yukio, two of Tsuruta's students, continue the tradition of the modern satsuma-biwa. Carlo Forlivesi's compositions Boethius (ボエティウス) and Nuove Musiche per Biwa (琵琶のための新曲) were both written for performance on the satsuma-biwa designed by Tsuruta and Tanaka.

These works present a radical departure from the compositional languages usually employed for such an instrument. Also, thanks to the possibility of relying on a level of virtuosity never before attempted in this specific repertory, the composer has sought the renewal of the acoustic and aesthetic profile of the biwa, bringing out the huge potential in the sound material: attacks and resonance, tempo (conceived not only in the chronometrical but also deliberately empathetical sense), chords, balance and dialogue (with the occasional use of two biwas in Nuove Musiche per Biwa), dynamics and colour.

=== Modern biwa ===
==== Chikuzen-biwa ====
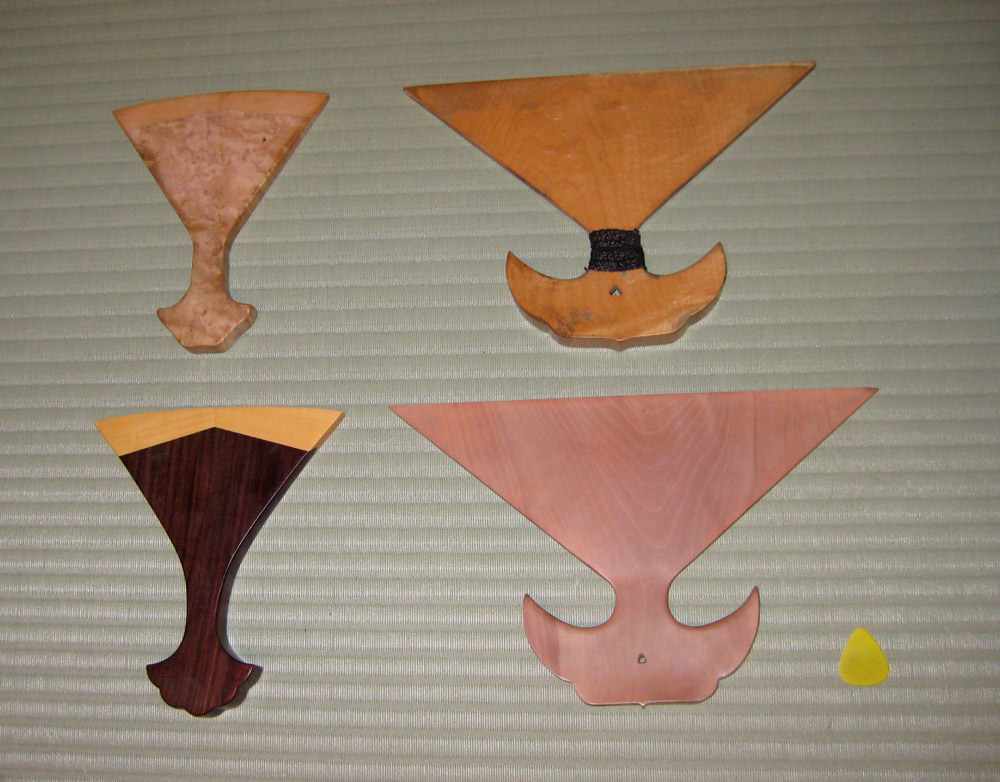
Plectra for the chikuzen-biwa (left) and satsuma-biwa

The Chikuzen-biwa (筑前琵琶), a biwa with four strings and four frets or five strings and five frets, was popularised in the Meiji period by Tachibana Satosada. Most contemporary performers use the five string version. Its plectrum is much smaller than that of the satsuma-biwa, usually about 13 cm (5.1 in) in width, although its size, shape, and weight depends on the sex of the player. The plectrum is usually made from rosewood with boxwood or ivory tips for plucking the strings. The instrument itself also varies in size, depending on the player. Male players typically play biwa that are slightly wider and/or longer than those used by women or children. The body of the instrument is never struck with the plectrum during play, and the five string instrument is played upright, while the four string is played held on its side. The instrument is tuned to match the key of the singer. An example tuning of the four string version is B, e, f♯ and b, and the five string instrument can be tuned to C, G, C, d and g. For the five string version, the first and third strings are tuned the same note, the second string three steps down, the fifth string an octave higher than the second string, and the fourth string a step down from the fifth. So the previously mentioned tuning can be tuned down to B♭, F, B♭, c, d. Asahikai and Tachibanakai are the two major schools of chikuzen-biwa. Popularly used by female biwa players such as Uehara Mari.

==== Nishiki-biwa ====
The nishiki-biwa (錦琵琶), a modern biwa with five strings and five frets, was popularised by the 20th-century biwa player and composer Suitō Kinjō (水藤錦穣; 1911–1973). Its plectrum is the same as that used for the satsuma-biwa. Its tuning is C, G, c, g, g.

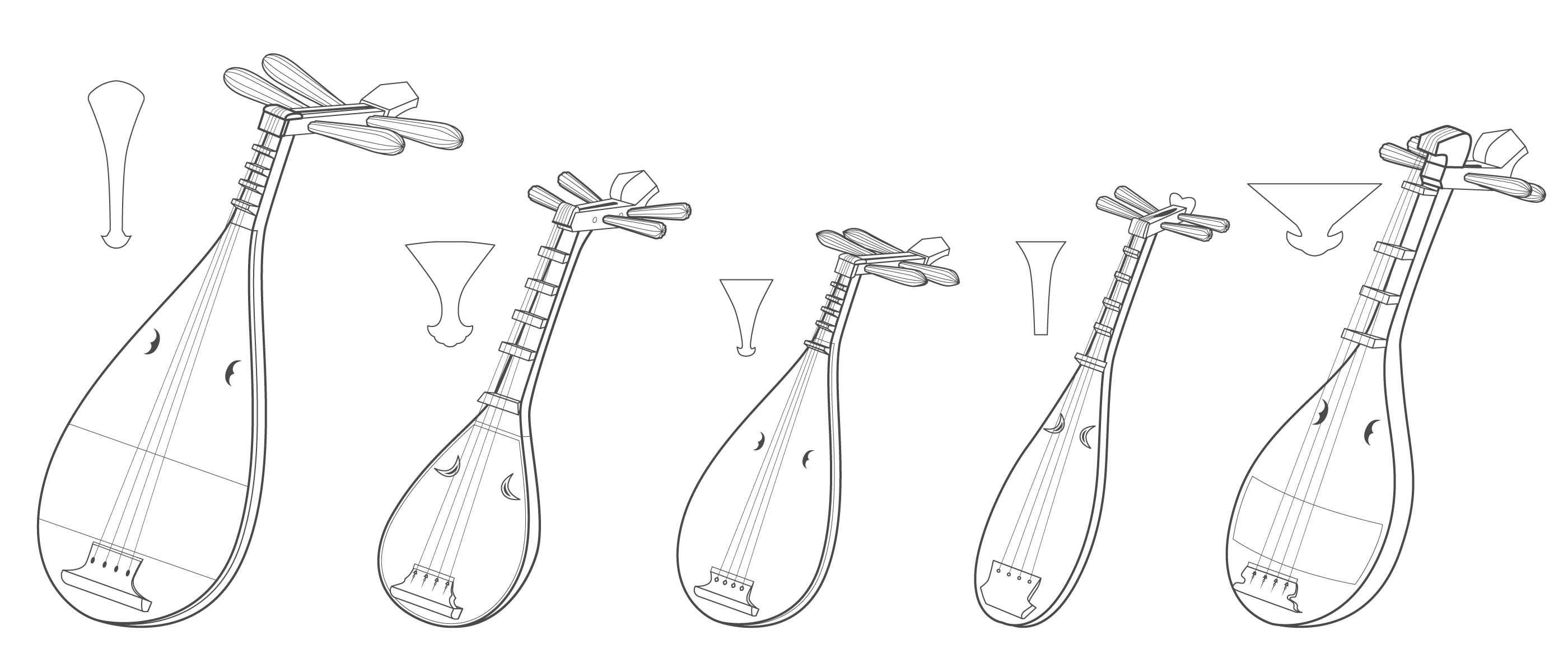
Gaku-biwa, chikuzen-biwa, heike-biwa, mōsō-biwa, satsuma-biwa and their plectra

== Styles of biwa music ==
The biwa, considered one of Japan's principal traditional instruments, has both influenced and been influenced by other traditional instruments and compositions throughout its long history; as such, a number of different musical styles played with the biwa exist.

- Hōgaku (邦楽, Japanese traditional music): In hōgaku, musical instruments usually serve as accompaniments to vocal performances, which dominate the musical style, with the overwhelming majority of hōgaku compositions being vocal.
- Gagaku (雅楽, Japanese court music): Gagaku was usually patronized by the imperial court or the shrines and temples. Gagaku ensembles were composed of string, wind, and percussion instruments, where string and wind instruments were more respected and percussion instruments were considered lesser instruments. Among the string instruments, the biwa seems to have been the most important instrument in orchestral gagaku performances.
- Shōmyō (声明, Buddhist chanting): While biwa was not used in shōmyō, the style of biwa singing is closely tied to shōmyō, especially mōsō- and heike-style biwa singing. Both shōmyō and mōsō-biwa are rooted in Buddhist rituals and traditions. Before arriving in Japan, shōmyō was used in Indian Buddhism. The mōsō-biwa was also rooted in Indian Buddhism, and the heike-biwa, as a predecessor to the mōsō-biwa, was the principal instrument of the biwa hōshi, who were blind Buddhist priests.

=== Biwa construction and tuning ===
Generally speaking, biwa have four strings, though modern satsuma- and chikuzen-biwa may have five strings. The strings on a biwa range in thickness, with the first string being thickest and the fourth string being thinnest; on chikuzen-biwa, the second string is the thickest, with the fourth and fifth strings being the same thickness on chikuzen- and satsuma-biwa. The varying string thickness creates different timbres when stroked from different directions.

In biwa, tuning is not fixed. General tones and pitches can fluctuate up or down entire steps or microtones. When singing in a chorus, biwa singers often stagger their entry and often sing through non-synchronized, heterophony accompaniment. In solo performances, a biwa performer sings monophonically, with melismatic emphasis throughout the performance. These monophonic do not follow a set harmony. Instead, biwa singers tend to sing with a flexible pitch without distinguishing soprano, alto, tenor, or bass roles. This singing style is complemented by the biwa, which biwa players use to produce short glissandi throughout the performance. The style of singing accompanying biwa tends to be nasal, particularly when singing vowels, the consonant ん, and syllables beginning with "g", such as ga (が) and gi (ぎ). Biwa performers also vary the volume of their voice between barely audible to very loud. Since biwa pieces were generally performed for small groups, singers did not need to project their voices as opera singers did in Western music tradition.

Biwa music is based on a pentatonic scale (sometimes referred to as a five-tone or five-note scale), meaning that each octave contains five notes. This scale sometimes includes supplementary notes, but the core remains pentatonic. The rhythm in biwa performances allows for a broad flexibility of pulse. Songs are not always metered, although more modern collaborations are metered. Notes played on the biwa usually begin slow and thin and progress through gradual accelerations, increasing and decreasing tempo throughout the performance. The texture of biwa singing is often described as "sparse".

The plectrum also contributes to the texture of biwa music. Different sized plectrums produced different textures; for example, the plectrum used on a mōsō-biwa was much larger than that used on a gaku-biwa, producing a harsher, more vigorous sound. The plectrum is also critical to creating the sawari sound, which is particularly utilized with satsuma-biwa. What the plectrum is made of also changes the texture, with ivory and plastic plectrums creating a more resilient texture to the wooden plectrum's twangy hum.

== Use in modern music ==
Biwa usage in Japan has declined greatly since the Heian period. Outside influence, internal pressures, and socio-political turmoil redefined biwa patronage and the image of the biwa; for example, the Ōnin War of the Muromachi period (1338–1573) and the subsequent Warring States period (15th–17th centuries) disrupted the cycle of tutelage for heikyoku (Note: Heikyoku is one of the oldest Japanese traditional music genres, originating in the 13th century. It is a semi-classical bardic tradition, not unlike the troubadour music of medieval Europe.) performers. As a result, younger musicians turned to other instruments and interest in biwa music decreased. Even the biwa hōshi transitioned to other instruments such as the shamisen (a three-stringed lute).

Interest in the biwa was revived during the Edo period (1600–1868), when Tokugawa Ieyasu unified Japan and established the Tokugawa shogunate. Ieyasu favored biwa music and became a major patron, helping to strengthen biwa guilds (called Todo) by financing them and allowing them special privileges. Shamisen players and other musicians found it financially beneficial to switch to the biwa, bringing new styles of biwa music with them. The Edo period proved to be one of the most prolific and artistically creative periods for the biwa in its long history in Japan.

In 1868, the Tokugawa shogunate collapsed, giving way to the Meiji period and the Meiji Restoration, during which the samurai class was abolished, and the Todo lost their patronage. Biwa players no longer enjoyed special privileges and were forced to support themselves. At the beginning of the Meiji period, it was estimated that there were at least one hundred traditional court musicians in Tokyo; however, by the 1930s, this number had reduced to just 46 in Tokyo, and a quarter of these musicians later died in World War II. Life in post-war Japan was difficult, and many musicians abandoned their music in favor of more sustainable livelihoods.

While many styles of biwa flourished in the early 1900s (such as kindai-biwa between 1900 and the 1930s), the cycle of tutelage was broken yet again by the war. In the present day, there are no direct means of studying the biwa in many biwa traditions. Even higo-biwa players, who were quite popular in the early 20th century, may no longer have a direct means of studying oral composition, as the bearers of the tradition have either died or are no longer able to play. Kindai-biwa still retains a significant number of professional and amateur practitioners, but the zato, heike, and moso-biwa styles have all but died out.

As biwa music declined in post-Pacific War Japan, many Japanese composers and musicians found ways to revitalize interest in it. They recognized that studies in music theory and music composition in Japan almost entirely consisted in Western theory and instruction. Beginning in the late 1960s, these musicians and composers began to incorporate Japanese music and Japanese instruments into their compositions; for example, one composer, Tōru Takemitsu, collaborated with Western composers and compositions to include the distinctly Asian biwa. His well-received compositions, such as November Steps, which incorporated biwa heikyoku with Western orchestral performance, revitalized interest in the biwa and sparked a series of collaborative efforts by other musician in genres ranging from J-Pop and enka to shin-hougaku and gendaigaku.

Other musicians, such as Yamashika Yoshiyuki, considered by most ethnomusicologists to be the last of the biwa hōshi, preserved scores of songs that were almost lost forever. Yamashika, born in the late Meiji period, continued the biwa hōshi tradition until his death in 1996. Beginning in the late 1960s to the late 1980s, composers and historians from all over the world visited Yamashika and recorded many of his songs; before this time, the biwa hōshi tradition had been a completely oral tradition. When Yamashika died in 1996, the era of the biwa hōshi tutelage died with him, but the music and genius of that era continues thanks to his recordings.

== In popular culture ==
- In the manga series Demon Slayer: Kimetsu no Yaiba, secondary antagonist Nakime manipulates the Infinity Castle by playing a biwa.

== Recordings ==
- Silenziosa Luna – 沈黙の月 / ALM Records ALCD-76 (2008).

== See also ==
- History and evolution of the lute
- Bipa
