= Rikuzen-Shirasawa Station =

Railway station in Sendai, Japan

Rikuzen-Shirasawa Station 陸前白沢駅
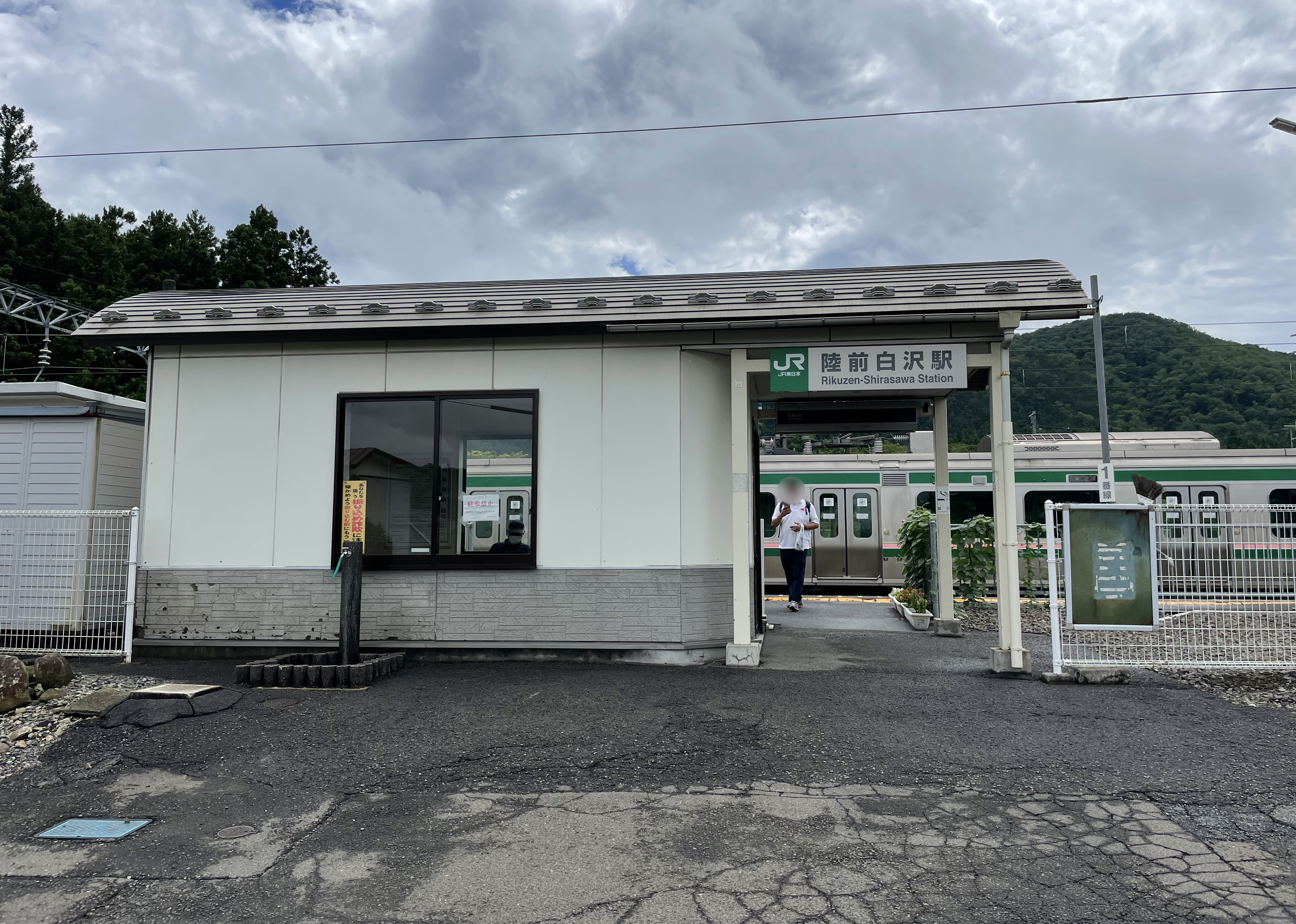
- Rikuzen-Shirasawa Station in July 2022

General information
- Location: Omichi, Kamiayashi, Aoba-ku, Sendai-shi, Miyagi-ken 989-3124; Japan
- Coordinates: 38°16′41.5″N 140°42′8″E
- Operator: JR East
- Line: ■ Senseki Line
- Distance: 20.6 km from Sendai
- Platforms: 2 side platforms
- Tracks: 2

Other information
- Status: Unstaffed
- Website: Official website

History
- Opened: 30 August 1931

Passengers
- FY2007: 55 daily

Services
Preceding station	JR East	Following station
Kumagane towards Yamagata	Senzan Line Local	Ayashi towards Sendai
Location
- Location within Miyagi Prefecture Location within Japan

Rikuzen-Shirasawa Station (陸前白沢駅, Rikuzen-Shirasawa-eki) is a railway station in Aoba-ku, Sendai, Miyagi Prefecture, Japan, operated by East Japan Railway Company (JR East).

== Lines ==
Rikuzen-Shirasawa Station is served by the Senzan Line, and is located 20.6 kilometers from the starting point of the line at Sendai.

== Station layout ==
The station has two opposed side platforms connected to the station building by a level crossing. The station is unattended.

=== Platforms ===
1	■ Senzan Line	for Ayashi and Sendai for Sakunami, Yamadera, and Yamagata
2	■ Senzan Line	for Sakunami, Yamadera, and Yamagata

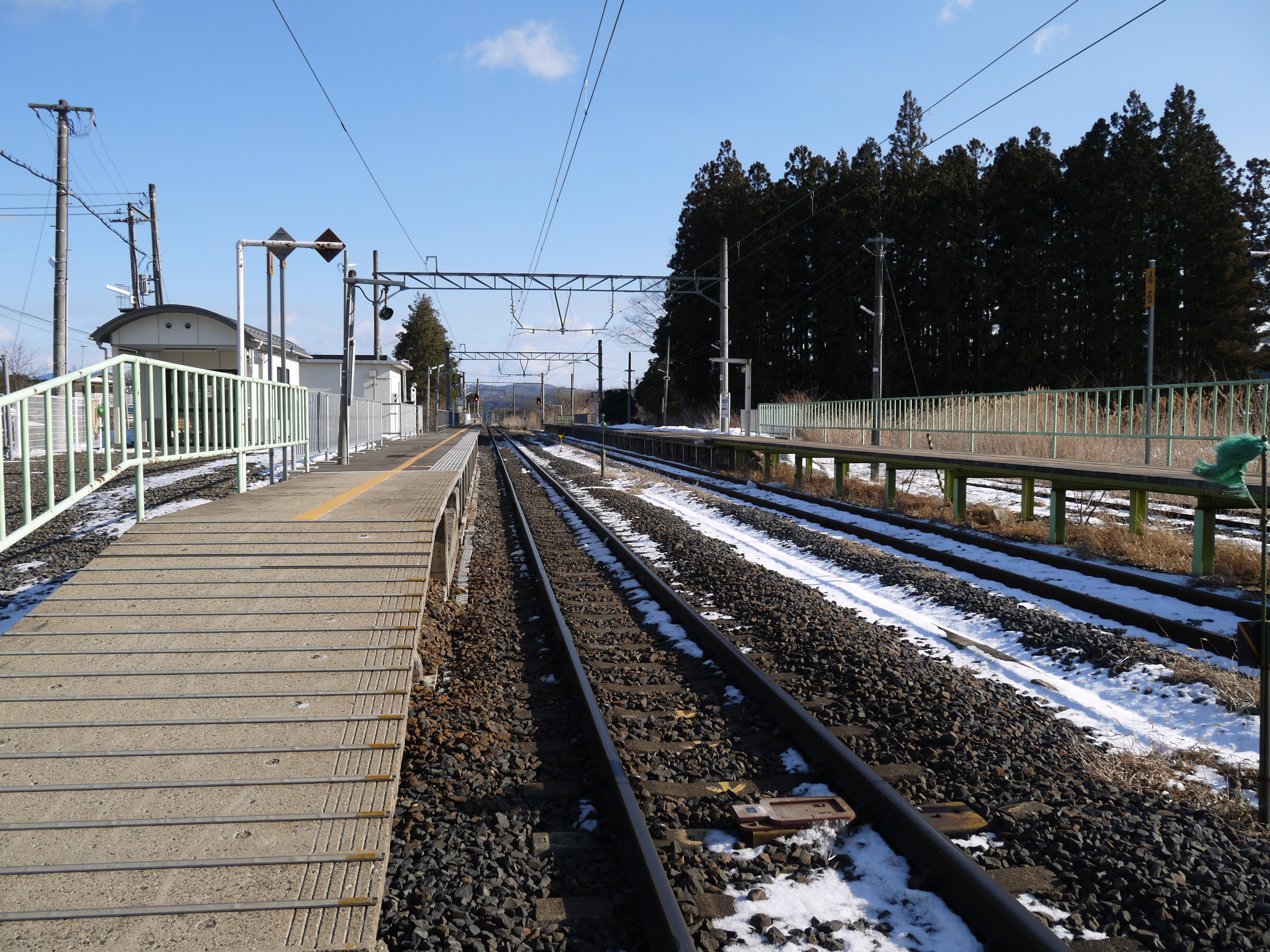
The platforms in January 2015

== History ==
Rikuzen-Shirasawa Station opened on 30 August 1931. The station was absorbed into the JR East network upon the privatization of Japanese National Railways (JNR) on 1 April 1987.

== Surrounding area ==
- National Route 457

== See also ==
- List of railway stations in Japan
