= Kunimi Station (Miyagi) =

Railway station in Sendai, Japan

Kunimi Station 国見駅
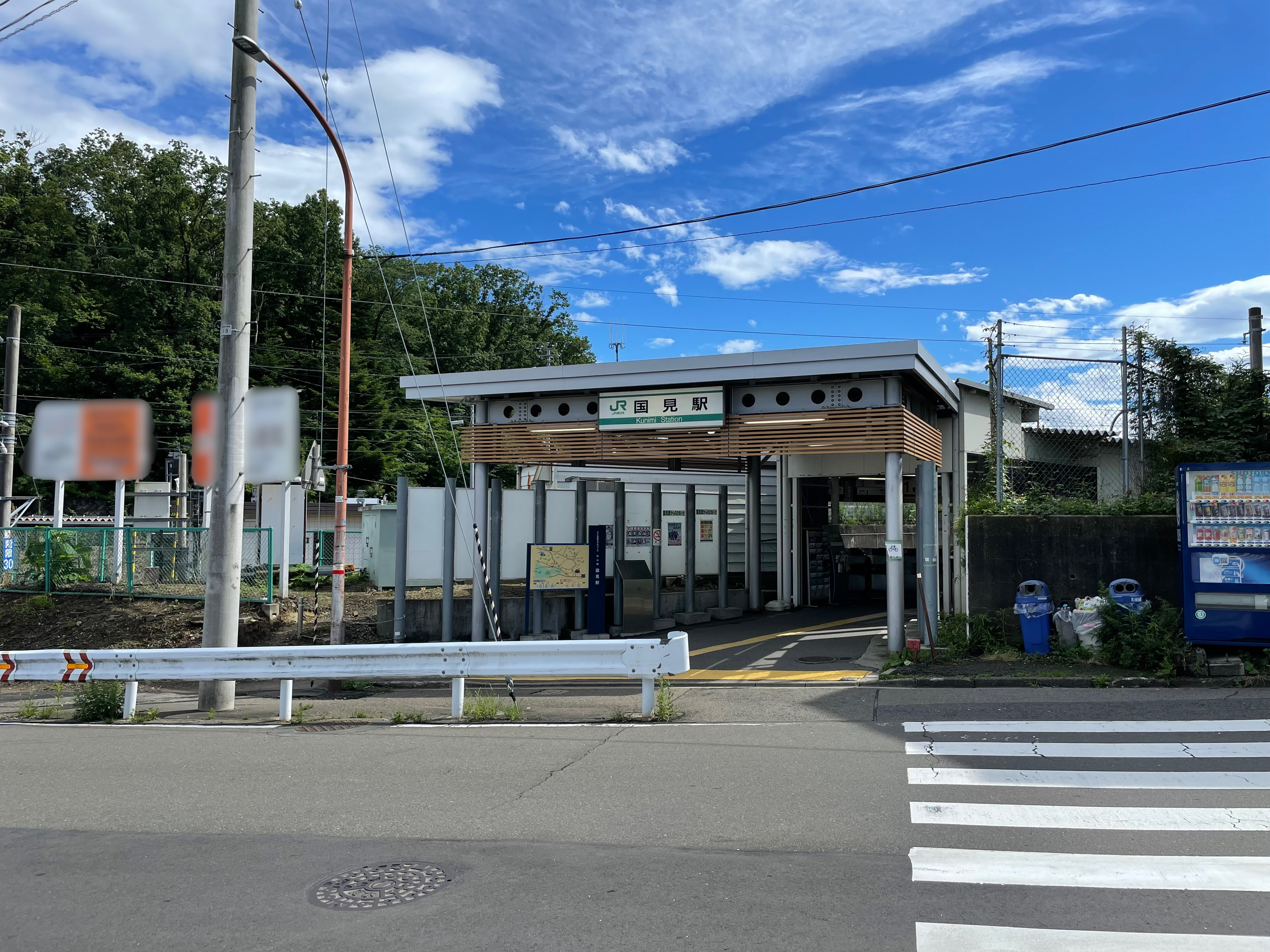
- Kunimi Station in July, 2022

General information
- Location: Bōzumon, Aramaki, Aoba-ku, Sendai-shi, Miyagi-ken 980-0845; Japan
- Coordinates: 38°16′29″N 140°50′0″E
- Operator: JR East
- Line: ■ Senzan Line
- Distance: 8.6 km from Sendai
- Platforms: 2 side platforms
- Tracks: 2

Other information
- Status: Staffed ("Midori no Madoguchi")
- Website: Official website

History
- Opened: 1 February 1984

Passengers
- FY2018: 3,227 daily

Services
| Preceding station | JR East | Following station |
|---|---|---|
| Rikuzen-Ochiai towards Yamagata | Senzan Line Rapid A B | Kita-Sendai towards Sendai |
| Kuzuoka towards Yamagata | Senzan Line Rapid C Local | Tōhokufukushidaimae towards Sendai |
Location

Kunimi Station (国見駅, Kunimi-eki) is a railway station in Aoba-ku, Sendai in Miyagi Prefecture, Japan, operated by East Japan Railway Company (JR East).

== Lines ==
Kunimi Station is served by the Senzan Line, and is located 8.6 kilometers from the terminus of the line at Sendai.

== Station layout ==
The station has two opposed side platforms connected to the station building by a level crossing. The station has a "Midori no Madoguchi" staffed ticket office.

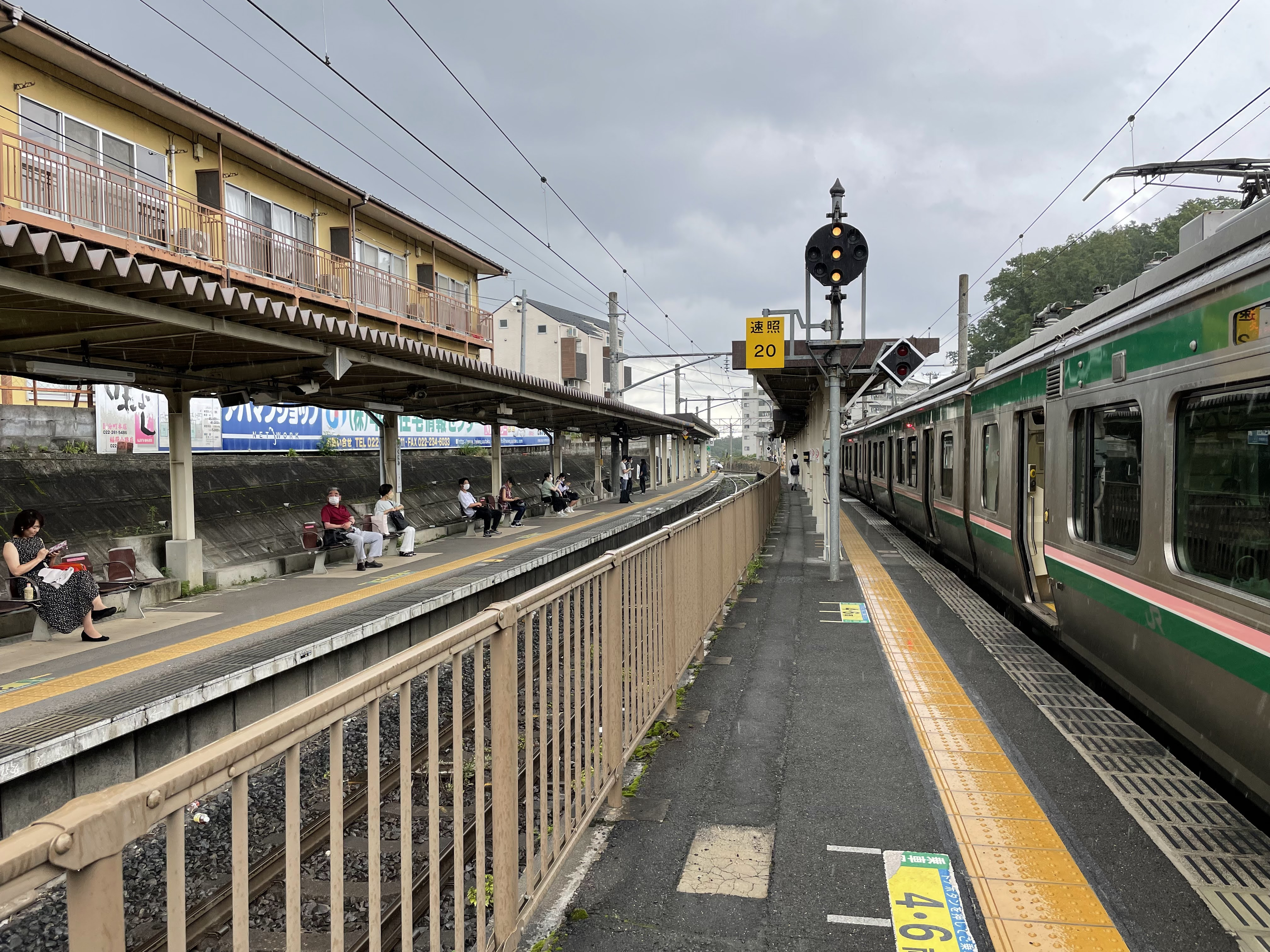
Platform 2 in July, 2022

=== Platforms ===
| 1 | ■ Senzan Line | for Kita-Sendai and Sendai |
| 2 | ■ Senzan Line | for Sakunami, Yamadera, and Yamagata |

== History ==
Kunimi Station opened on 1 February 1984.

== Passenger statistics ==
In fiscal 2018, the station was used by an average of 3,227 passengers daily (boarding passengers only).

== Surrounding area ==
The surrounding area is mainly residential and filled with low-cost student housing where students commute to the nearby Tohoku University Kawauchi Campus.

== See also ==
- List of railway stations in Japan
