= Tōhokufukushidaimae Station =

Railway station in Sendai, Japan

Tōhokufukushidaimae Station 東北福祉大前駅
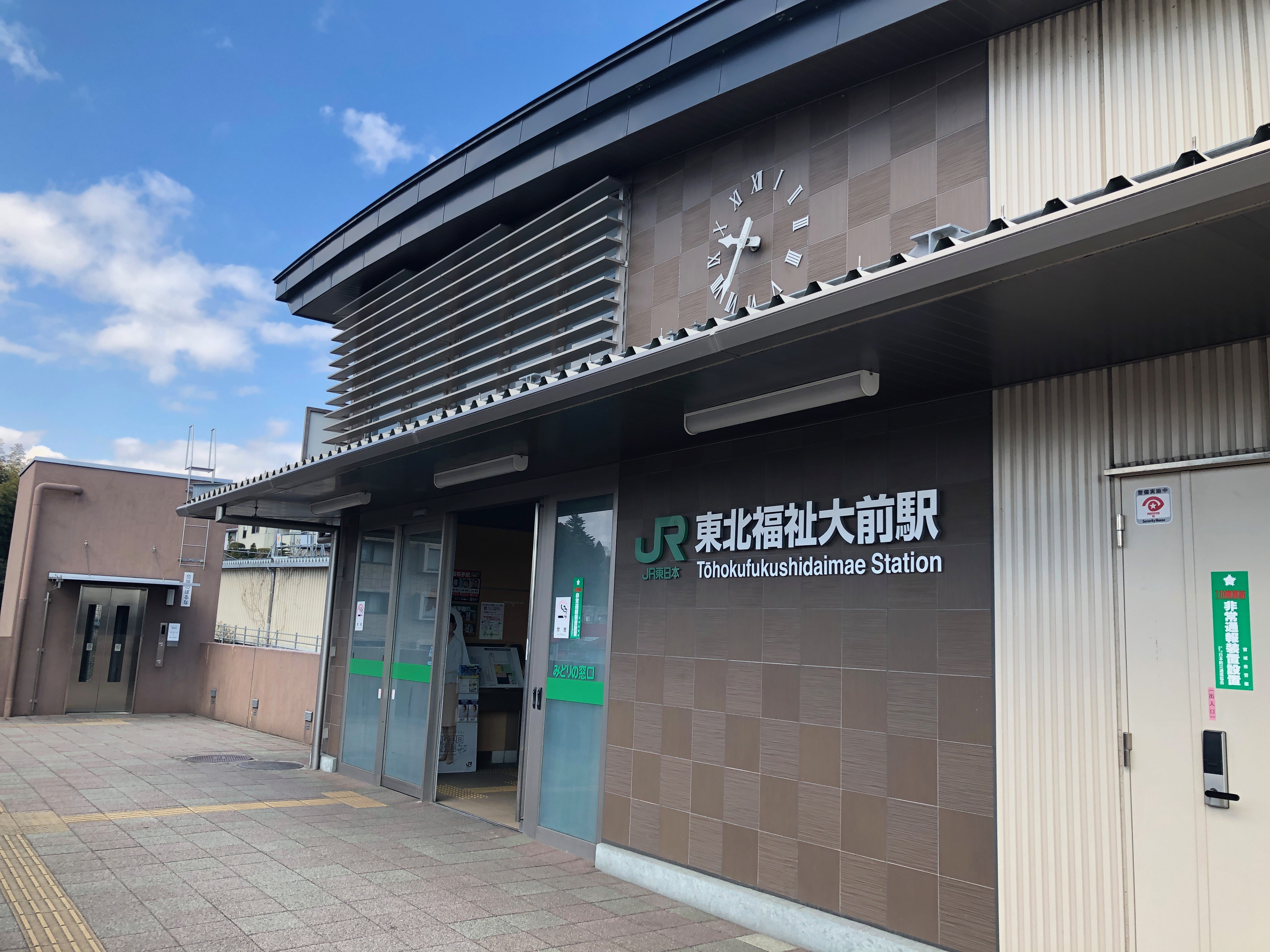
- Station exterior in March 2019

General information
- Location: 1-222-5 Kunimi, Aoba-ku, Sendai-shi, Miyagi-ken 981-0943; Japan
- Coordinates: 38°16′50″N 140°50′34″E
- Operator: JR East
- Line: ■ Senseki Line
- Distance: 7.5 km from Sendai
- Platforms: 2 side platforms
- Tracks: 2

Other information
- Status: Staffed (Midori no Madoguchi)
- Website: Official website

History
- Opened: 18 March 2007

Passengers
- FY2018: 3,645 daily

Services
Preceding station	JR East	Following station
Kunimi towards Yamagata	Senzan Line Rapid C Local	Kitayama towards Sendai
Location
- Location within Miyagi Prefecture Location within Japan

Tōhokufukushidaimae Station (東北福祉大前駅, Tōhokufukushidaimae-eki) is a railway station in Aoba-ku, Sendai in Miyagi Prefecture, Japan, operated by East Japan Railway Company (JR East).

== Lines ==
Tōhokufukushidaimae Station is served by the Senzan Line, and is located 7.5 kilometers from the terminus of the line at Sendai.

== Station layout ==
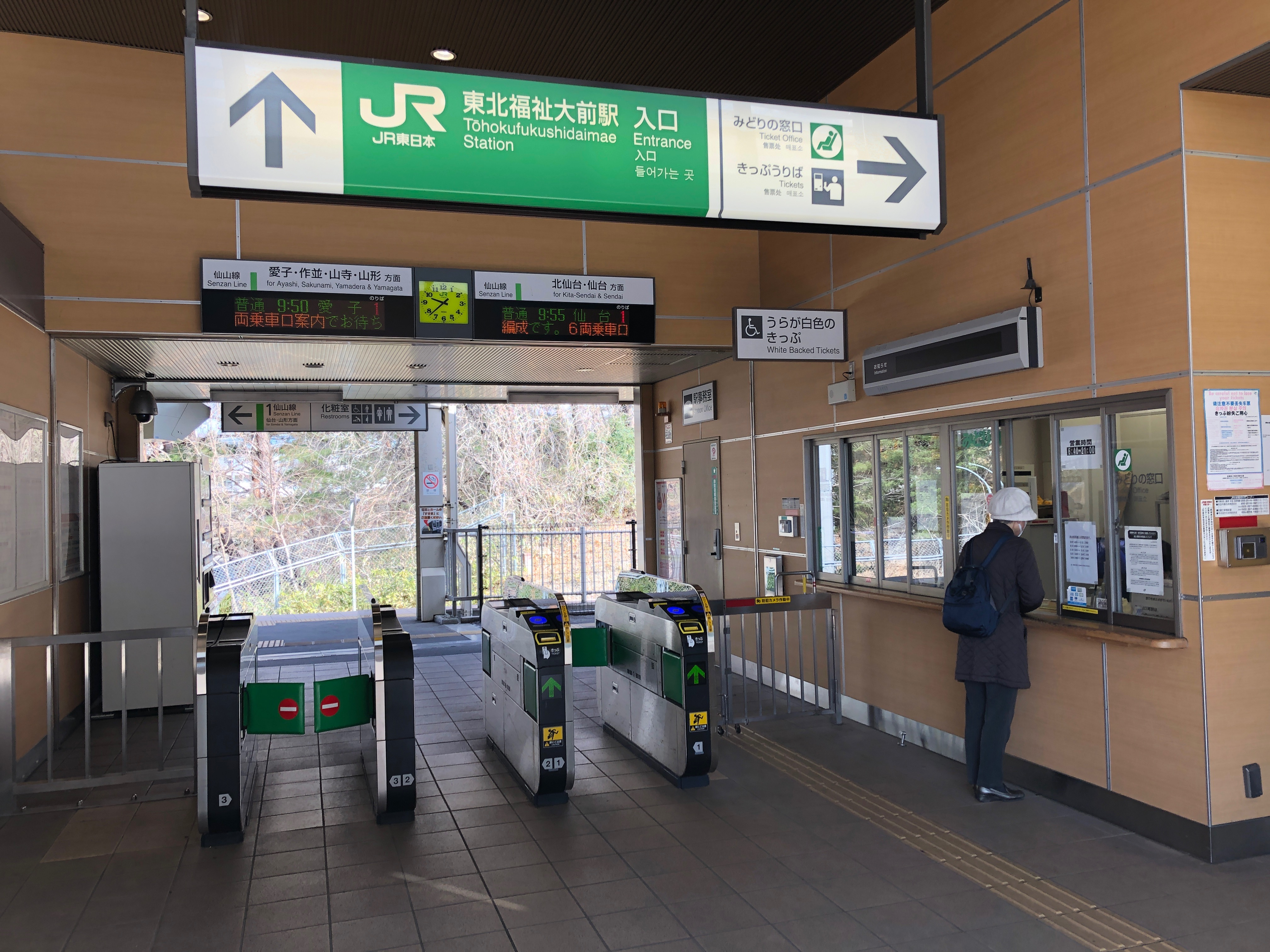
Station building gateline and ticket office in 2019

The station is an elevated station with a single side platform where all trains stop. The station building is located to the east end of the platform and features a Midori no Madoguchi staffed ticket office, ticket machines, and an accessible restroom. Stairs and an elevator to street level are located directly to the south of the station, and a car park is located to the east.

== Platforms ==
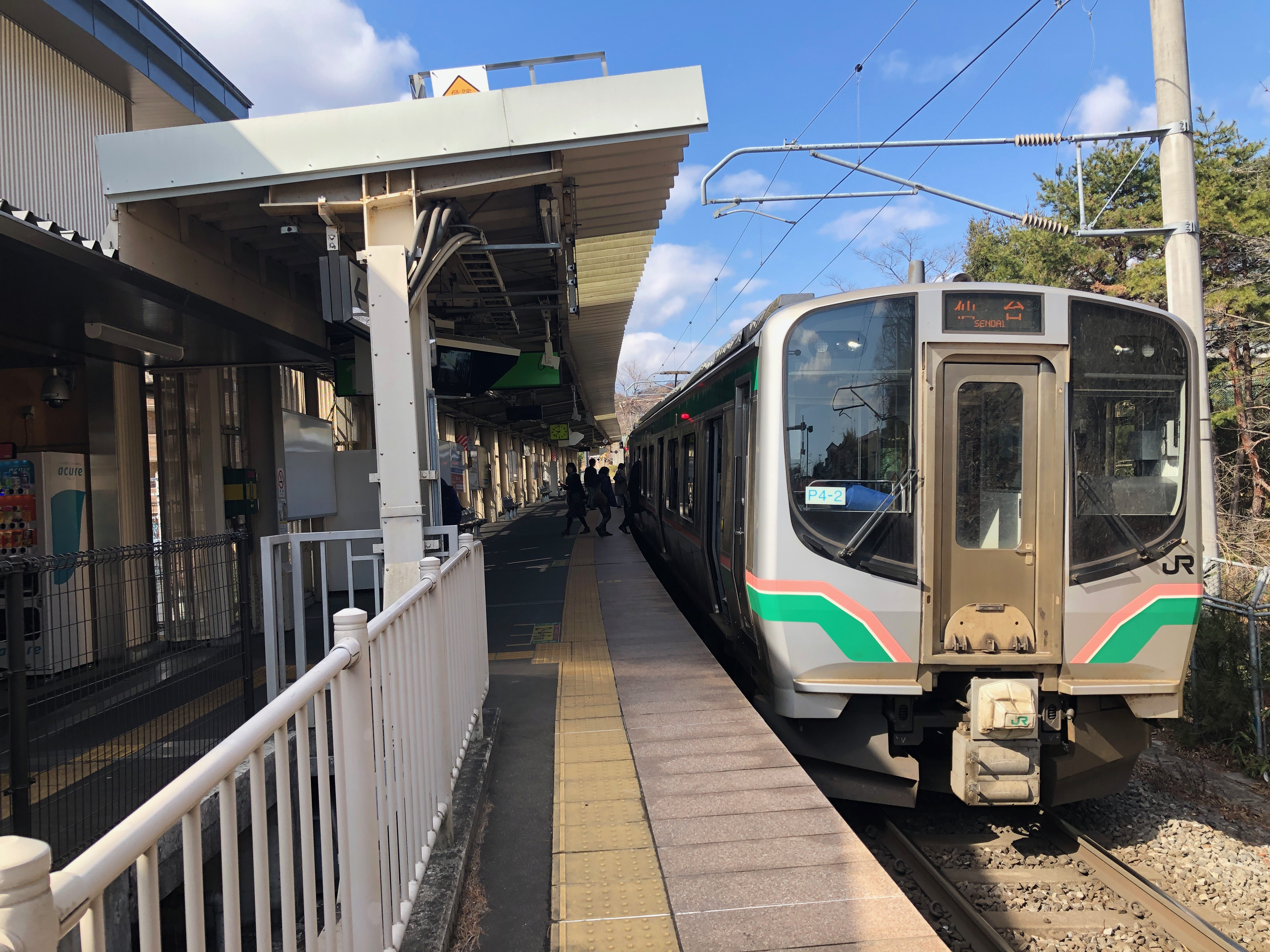
Station platform in 2019

1	■ Senzan Line	for Ayashi, Sakunami, and Yamagata
1	■ Senzan Line	for Kita-Sendai and Sendai

== History ==
Tōhokufukushidaimae Station opened on 18 March 2007. Kazuhiro Sasaki (retired baseball pitcher and alumnus of nearby Tohoku Fukushi University) served as the ceremonial station master for the opening day.

== Passenger statistics ==
In fiscal 2018, the station was used by an average of 3,645 passengers daily (boarding passengers only).

== Surrounding area ==
- Tohoku Fukushi University

== See also ==
- List of railway stations in Japan
