= Rikuzen-Ochiai Station =

Railway station in Sendai, Japan

Rikuzen-Ochiai Station 陸前落合駅
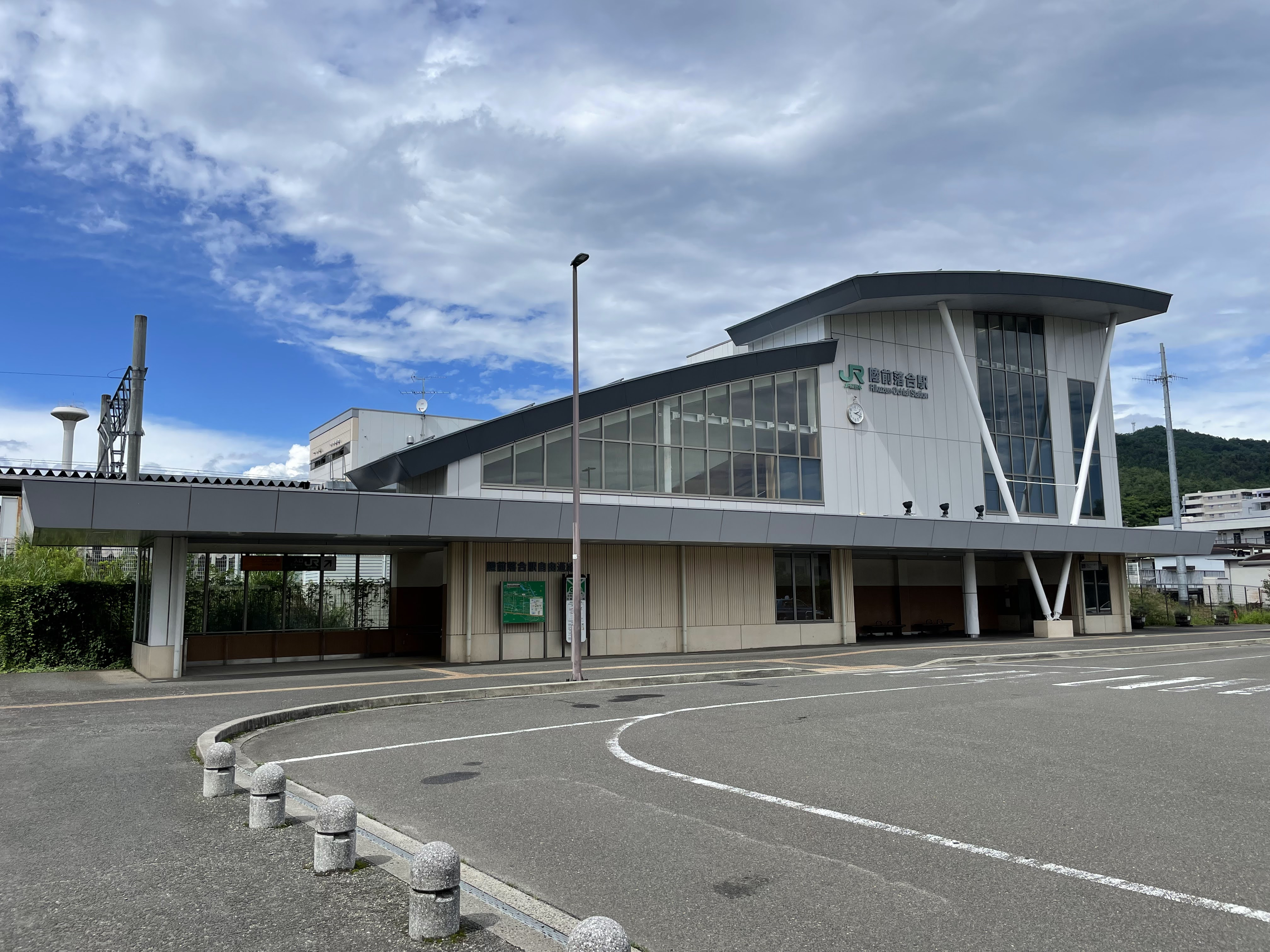
- Rikuzen-Ochiai Station in July 2022

General information
- Location: 2-8-20 Ochiai, Aoba-ku, Sendai-shi, Miyagi-ken 989-3126; Japan
- Coordinates: 38°16′24″N 140°47′25″E
- Operator: JR East
- Line: ■ Senseki Line
- Distance: 12.7 km from Sendai
- Platforms: 2 side platforms
- Tracks: 2

Other information
- Status: Staffed (Midori no Madoguchi)
- Website: Official website

History
- Opened: 29 September 1929

Passengers
- FY2018: 3,895 daily

Services
Preceding station	JR East	Following station
Ayashi towards Yamagata	Senzan Line Rapid A B	Kunimi towards Sendai
Ayashi towards Yamagata	Senzan Line Rapid C Local	Kuzuoka towards Sendai
Location
- Location within Miyagi Prefecture Location within Japan

Rikuzen-Ochiai Station (陸前落合駅, Rikuzen-Ochiai-eki) is a railway station in Aoba-ku, Sendai in Miyagi Prefecture, Japan, operated by East Japan Railway Company (JR East).

== Lines ==
Rikuzen-Ochiai Station is served by the Senzan Line, and is located 12.7 kilometers from the terminus of the line at Sendai.

== Station layout ==
The station has two opposed side platforms connected to the station building by a footbridge. The station has a Midori no Madoguchi staffed ticket office.

=== Platforms ===
1	■ Senzan Line	for Kita-Sendai and Sendai
2	■ Senzan Line	for Sakunami, Yamadera, and Yamagata

== History ==
Rikuzen-Ochiai Station opened on 29 September 1929. The station was absorbed into the JR East network upon the privatization of Japanese National Railways (JNR) on 1 April 1987. A new station building was completed in March 2005.

== Passenger statistics ==
In fiscal 2018, the station was used by an average of 3895 passengers daily (boarding passengers only).

== Surrounding area ==
The station has two entrances. The north entrances leads to a housing complex and further residential areas. The south entrance adjoins National Route 457, which runs from Sendai to Yamagata.

== See also ==
- List of railway stations in Japan
