= Sakunami Onsen =

Hot spring in Miyagi Prefecture, Japan

Sakunami Onsen 作並温泉
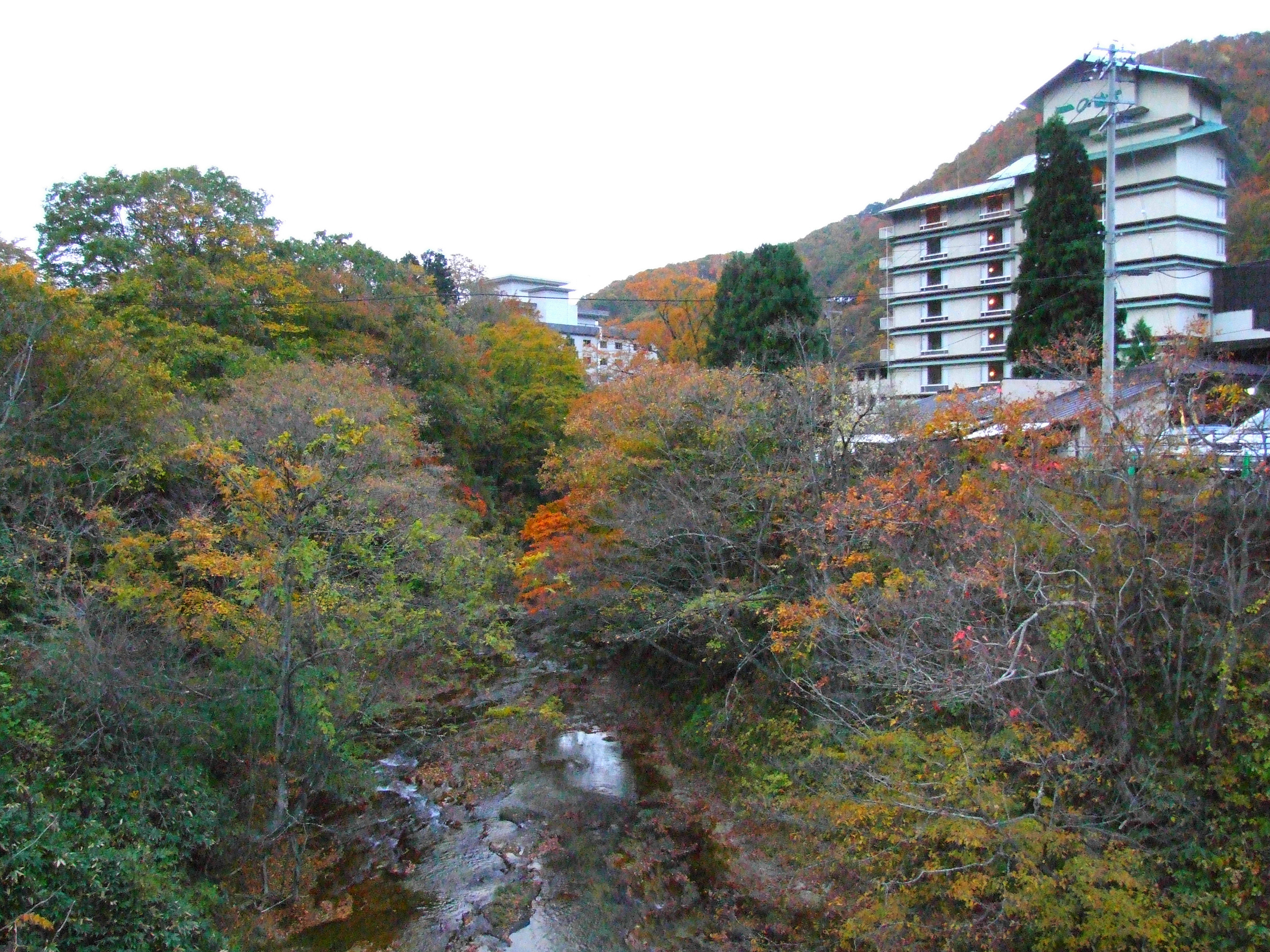
- Hirose River. On the right is Ichinobo, front is Iwamatsu Ryokan (November 2007)

- Location within Miyagi Prefecture Location within Japan
- Interactive map of Sakunami Onsen 作並温泉
- Location: Sendai, Miyagi, Japan
- Coordinates: 38°19′53.6″N 140°36′48.6″E
- Type: alkaline, saline
- Temperature: 60 deg C

Sakunami Onsen (作並温泉) is a hot spring resort district in northern Japan about 25 kilometres (16 mi) to the northwest of downtown Sendai, Miyagi Prefecture.

== History ==
Local legend attributes the foundation of Sakunami Onsen to the wandering Buddhist priest Gyōki in 721 AD In the early Kamakura period. The Azuma Kagami records that Minamoto no Yoritomo visited the area during his campaign against the Northern Fujiwara at Hiraizumi.

Sakunami has a number of ryokan which were founded in the Edo period under the auspices of the Sendai Domain. The onsen cluster is on the steep banks of the Hirosegawa River that eventually flows through downtown Sendai.

== Transport ==
Trains on the Senzan Line from Sendai Station to Yamagata Station stop at Sakunami Station, a trip that takes roughly 40 minutes from Sendai.
