= Laurence Sullivan =

English author

- Born: Birmingham, United Kingdom
- Education: MDrama (Hons), MA, PhD
- Alma mater: University of Kent Utrecht University University of Birmingham, Shakespeare Institute Northumbria University
- Writing career
- Genres: Short Fiction, Flash Fiction, Haiku
- Website: www.laurencesullivan.co.uk

Laurence Sullivan (born 1992) is an English author of short stories, flash fiction, and haiku poetry. He grew up in Malvern, Worcestershire, and acquired his bachelor's degree from University of Kent, his master's degree from the Shakespeare Institute, University of Birmingham, and his PhD, which analysed literary portrayals of women's domestic medicine during the eighteenth century, from Northumbria University.

Sullivan is the author of over forty short stories. As a runner-up in the Wicked Young Writer Awards: Gregory Maguire Award 2016, he has been published online, in multiple magazines and various anthologies. Sullivan has, also, been nominated for multiple awards.

== Poetry and prose ==
Year	Title	Publication
2024 (November)	Twice a Half-Life, Coming Out, Going Home, and Leftovers	Flash Dances: 100 Little Queer Stories, Paradise Press
2023 (October)	Bouquet of Goodbyes	Sampson Low
2022 (July)	Lives Entwined	Firewords Magazine
2022 (May)	Each and Every April	Canopy 2022, (Sampson Low)
2020 (July)	Latency	Lockdown Prize 2020, Fish Publishing
2020 (May)	World Weary	Popshot Quarterly, The Earth Issue, Chelsea Magazine Company
2020 (April)	World Haiku Series 2019	Akita International Haiku Network
2019 (October)	Winter Coat	Basho Memorial Museum
2019 (August)	Establishing Connection	Shipwrecked Anthology (Sampson Low)
2019 (July)	Musty Book and Border Wall	11th Haiku Submissions Collection (Yamadera Basho Memorial Museum)
2019 (March 14th)	Teapot	Haiku Masters, NHK World
2019 (January 22nd)	Blossom in the Wind	Flash Fiction Magazine
2018 (October)	The Pretender	Across the Margin
2018 (September)	Unrequited	Dime Show Review
2018 (August)	Nest and Wisteria	10th Haiku Submissions Collection (Yamadera Basho Memorial Museum)
2018 (August)	Wildflowers	Haiku Masters, NHK World
2018 (July)	Fanning the Flames	Literary Orphans
2018 (February)	Gods	Haiku Masters, NHK World
2018 (February)	Nameless	Ginosko Literary Journal
2018 (January)	Chasing Rainclouds	The Literary Nest
2018 (January)	Dreams	Haiku Masters, NHK World
2017 (November)	Spirit Guide	DECASP Comedy Gazette
2017 (August)	El Poderoso Empalador	Pilcrow & Dagger
2017 (June)	Lady Luck	The Fiction Pool
2017 (May)	Impossible Goodbyes	Foliate Oak Literary Magazine
2017 (April)	Waiting for Banquo	Crack the Spine
2016 (December)	From Father to Son	Postcard Shorts
2016 (August)	The Fox	The Literary Hatchet
2016 (July)	Fireflies and Fire	8th Haiku Submissions Collection (Yamadera Basho Memorial Museum)
2016 (June)	Clouding the Future	Wicked Young Writer Awards Anthology
2016 (March)	An Invaluable Essence	Corvus Review
2015 (October)	Attribute of the Strong	Inspired by Gandhi (Sampad)
2015 (June)	The Pact	The List
2015 (June)	Teddy’s Little Secret	Flash Flood
2015 (May)	The Strangest Suitor	Londonist
2015 (April)	Worth a Thousand Words	Flash Flood
2015 (February)	Masks She Wears	Drunk Monkeys
2015 (February)	Bristol's Own Oasis	Dream of a Shadow
2015 (January)	Moth of Gion	Kishboo Magazine
2015 (January)	Accompaniment	50Word Stories
2014 (December)	The Red Rose	Story Shack Magazine
2014 (December)	Mrs. Ozeki	That Which We Do Not Understand (Amelia’s Magazine/House)
2014 (November)	In the Tea Leaves	Inspired by My Museum (Sampad and the British Council)
2014 (November)	Moth of Gion	Alfie Dog Fiction
2014 (November)	The Price of Life	Thick Jam
2014 (October)	Worth a Thousand Words	The Legendary
2014 (July)	Justice	Open Pen
2014 (June)	Flickering Dawn and The Arranged Marriage	Just100Words
2014 (April)	Moth of Gion	The Menteur
2014 (March)	Chains, Her Watchers, Slumber, Teddy’s Little Secret, Castaway and The Sssilent Killer	Darker Times Collection: Volume Two (Darker Times Fiction)
2013 (March)	The Gift, Rose and Tokyo Dreams	Darker Times Collection: Volume One (Darker Times Fiction)

== Awards ==
- Fish Publishing: Lockdown Prize 2020 (Shortlisted)
- 73rd Basho Memorial Haiku Competition (Honourable Mention)
- Wicked Young Writer Awards: Gregory Maguire Award 2016 (Runner-up/Highly Commended)
- Writers' Centre Norwich Award (Shortlisted)
- Reedsy First Chapter Award (Shortlisted)
- Dante Rossetti Award 2015 (Finalist)
