= Takase Station =

Takase Station is the name of two train stations in Japan:

- Takase Station (Kagawa) (高瀬駅) in Kagawa Prefecture
- Takase Station (Yamagata) (高瀬駅) in Yamagata Prefecture
