= Yamadera Basho Memorial Museum =

Coordinates: 38°18′34.3″N 140°26′20.3″E

- 山寺芭蕉記念館
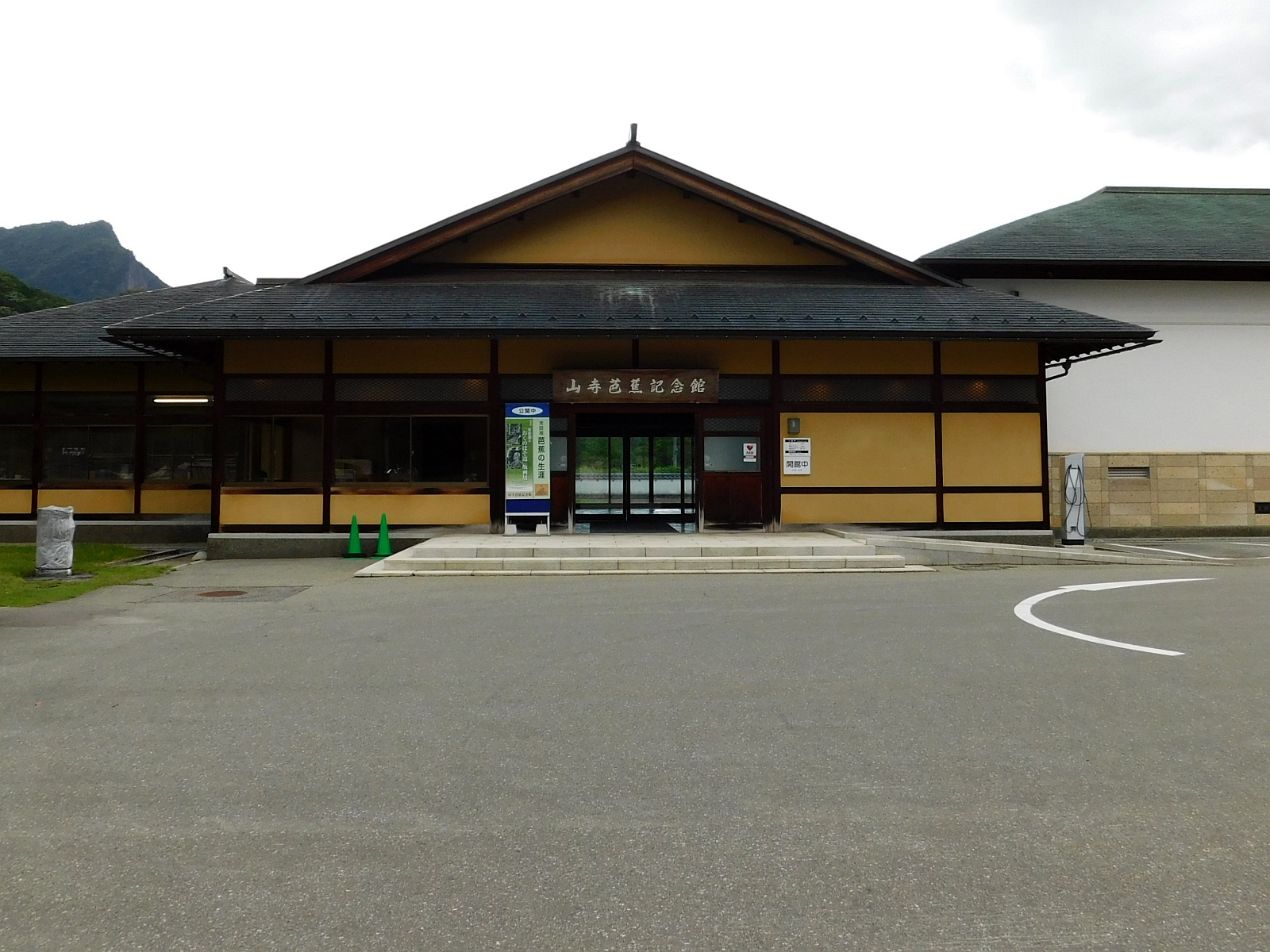
- Established: July 9, 1989; 37 years ago
- Location: Yamagata, Yamagata Prefecture, Japan
- Type: Biographical museum
- Public transit access: Yamadera Station, JR East
- Website: yamadera-basho.jp

The Yamadera Basho Memorial Museum (山寺芭蕉記念館, Yamadera Bashō Kinenkan) is a biographical museum in Yamagata, Japan. It is located near the Yamadera temple, where poet Matsuo Bashō visited in 1689 during his travels that were chronicled in Oku no Hosomichi (The Narrow Road to the Deep North).

The museum primarily chronicles Bashō's life and his contributions to the literary style of haiku.

== Overview ==
In 1989, Yamagata marked its 100th anniversary, coinciding with the 300th anniversary of Matsuo Bashō’s visit to Yamadera. As part of a broader cultural development initiative, the museum was opened on July 9.

Just outside Yamadera Station on the Senzan Line, it sits on the south side of the steep river valley, facing Yamadera to the north with a scenic view of the temple.

Many writings by Bashō, and literati and artists from his time and later, are regularly displayed. Special exhibitions on related themes are also regularly mounted in the gallery.

The facility includes many traditional Japanese style meeting rooms and tea rooms used for tea ceremonies and other cultural programs, including seminars on literature and haiku taikai poetry writing contests (俳句大会), in both Japanese and English. The buildings in traditional sukiya-zukuri (数寄屋造り) tea ceremony room style were designed by architect Masao Nakamura.
