= Oku-Nikkawa Station =

Railway station in Sendai, Japan

Oku-Nikkawa Station 奥新川駅
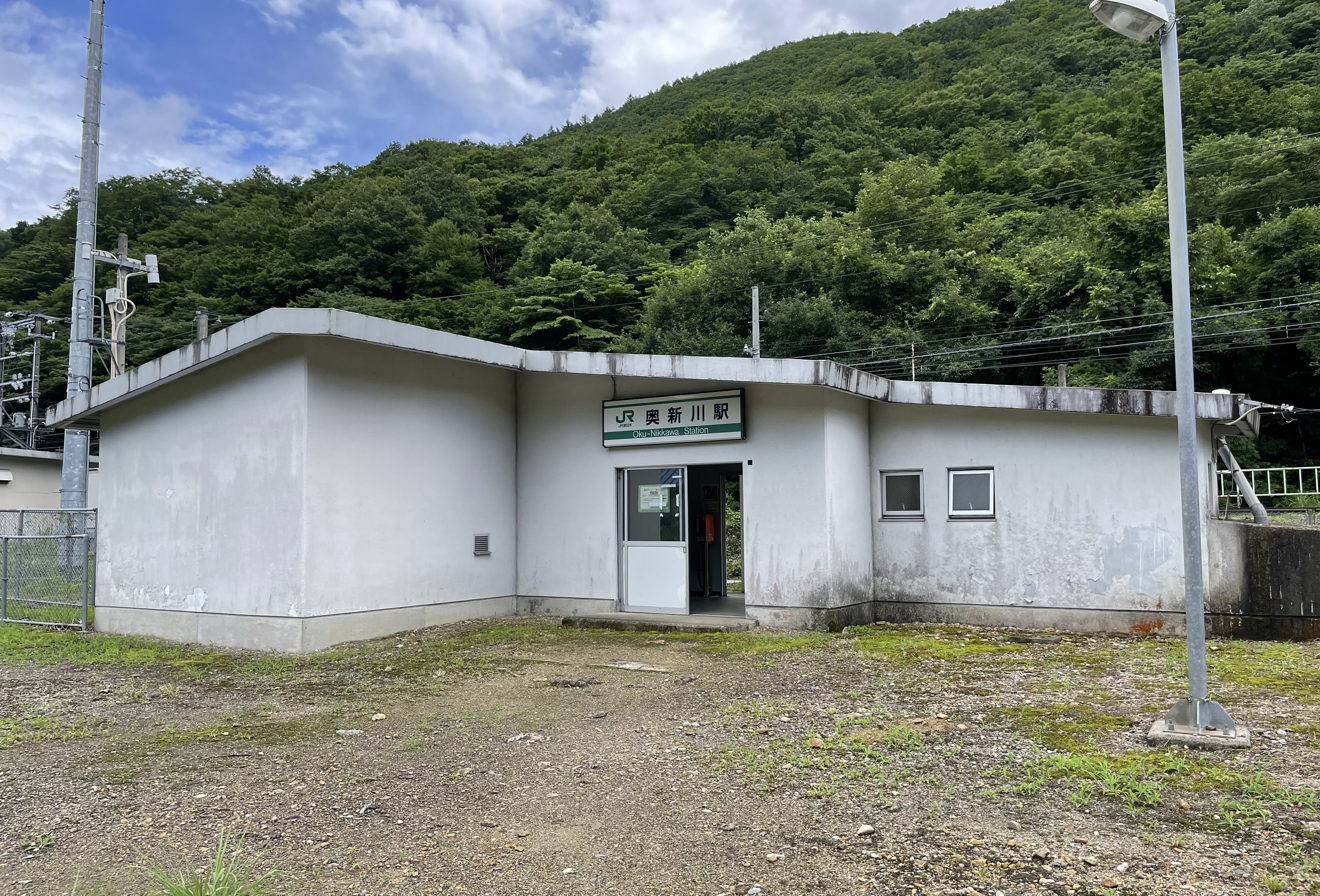
- Oku-Nikkawa Station in July, 2022

General information
- Location: Gakeyama, Nikkawa, Aoba-ku, Sendai-shi, Miyagi-ken 989-3434; Japan
- Coordinates: 38°19′34″N 140°35′39″E
- Operator: JR East
- Line: ■ Senzan Line
- Distance: 33.8 km from Sendai
- Platforms: 2 side platforms
- Tracks: 2

Other information
- Status: Unstaffed
- Website: Official website

History
- Opened: 10 November 1937

Services
Preceding station	JR East	Following station
Omoshiroyama-Kōgen towards Yamagata	Senzan Line Local	Sakunami towards Sendai
Location
- Location within Sendai Location within Miyagi Prefecture Location within Japan

Oku-Nikkawa Station (奥新川駅, Oku-nikkawa-eki) is a railway station in Aoba-ku, Sendai, Miyagi Prefecture, Japan, operated by East Japan Railway Company (JR East).

== Lines ==
Oku-Nikkawa Station is served by the Senzan Line, and is located 33.8 kilometers from the starting point of the line at Sendai.

== Station layout ==
The station has a two opposed side platforms, connected to the station building by a level crossing. The station is unstaffed.

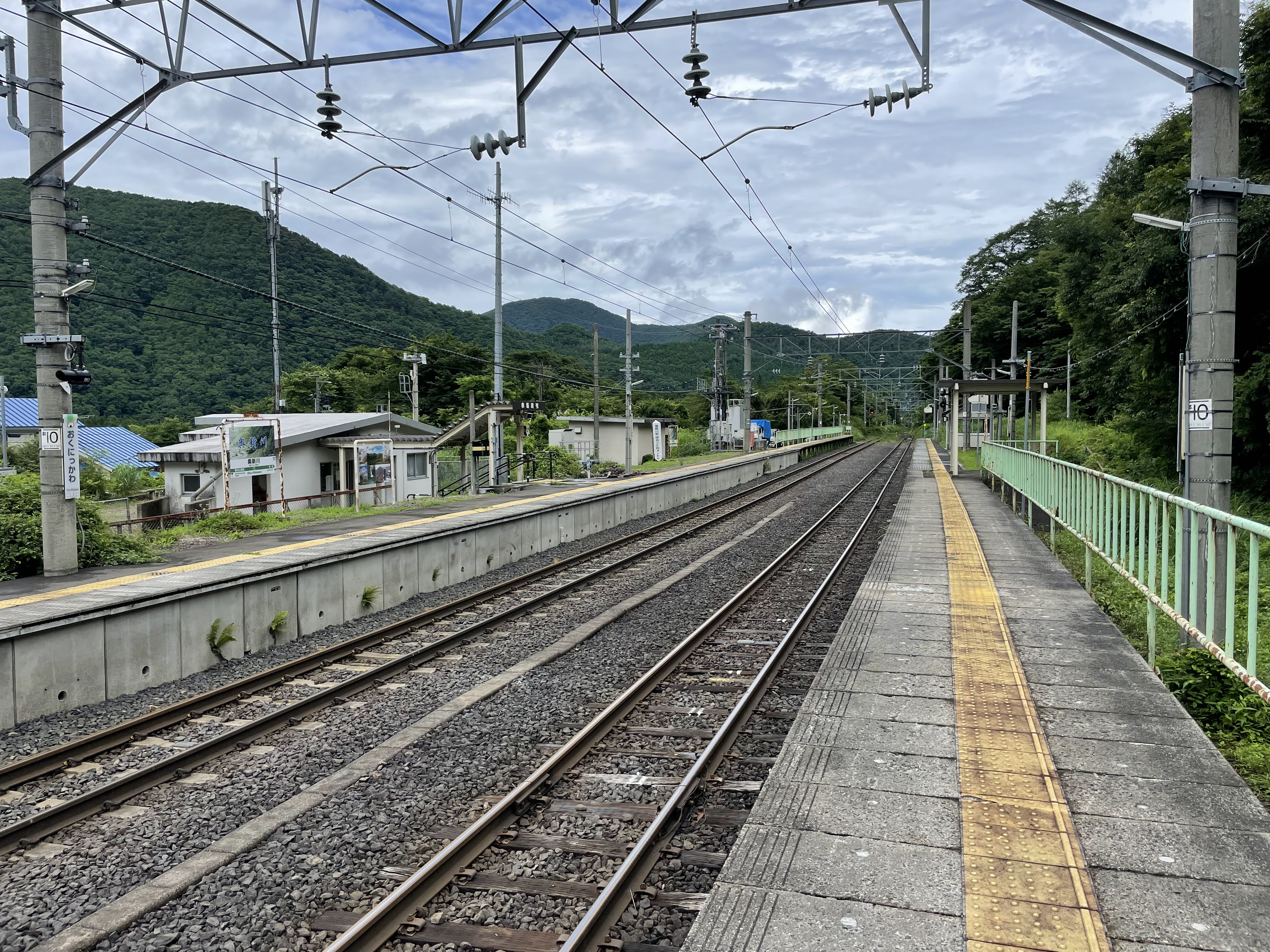
Platform in July, 2022

== History ==
The station opened on 10 November 1937. The station was absorbed into the JR East network upon the privatization of Japanese National Railways (JNR) on 1 April 1987.

== Surrounding area ==
- Okunikkawa camp grounds
- Former Nikkawa mine

== See also ==
- List of railway stations in Japan
