= Nishi-Sendai-Hairando Station =

Former railway station in Sendai, Japan

Coordinates: 38°18′16″N 140°39′53″E

Nishi-Sendai-Hairando Station 西仙台ハイランド駅
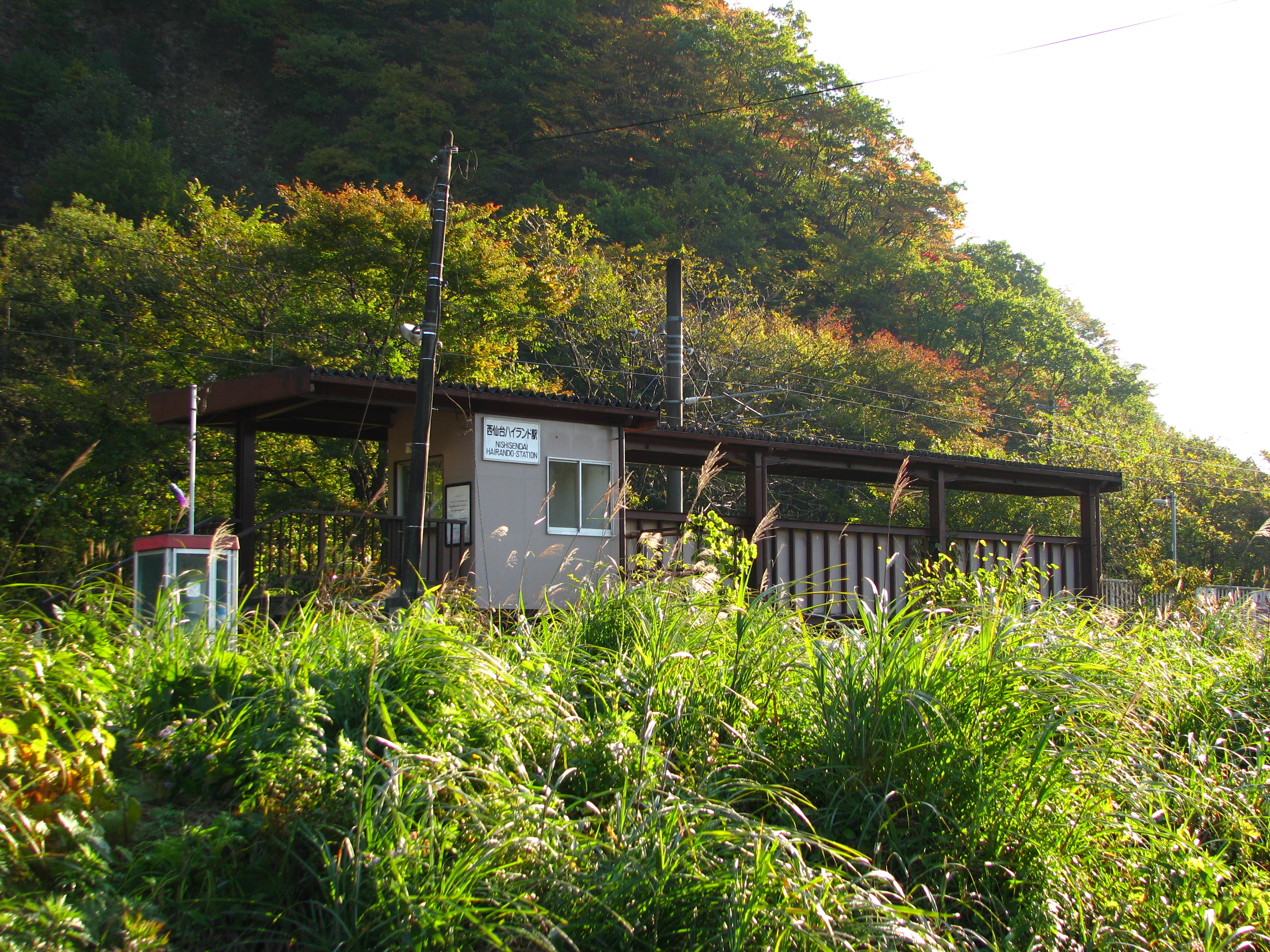
- Nishi-Sendai-Hairando Station in November 2008

General information
- Location: Nikkawa-aze, Aoba-ku, Sendai, Miyagi （宮城県仙台市青葉区新川字清水頭） Japan
- Operator: JR East
- Line: Senzan Line

History
- Opened: 21 March 1987
- Closed: 15 March 2014
Location

Nishi-Sendai-Hairando Station (西仙台ハイランド駅, Nishi-sendai-hairando-eki) was an East Japan Railway Company (JR East) railway station located in Aoba-ku, Sendai, Japan. It was opened on 21 March 1987. Services were suspended on 1 October 2003, and from 2003 until its official closure in 2014, it was not served by any trains.

== Line ==
- Senzan Line

== History ==
The station opened on March 21, 1987. On October 1, 2003, train services to the station were discontinued. The station was officially closed as of March 15, 2014 (March 14 being the last day).

== Surrounding area ==
- Sendai Hi-Land Resort

== See also ==
- List of railway stations in Japan
