= Kitayama Station (Miyagi) =

Railway station in Sendai, Japan

Kitayama Station 北山駅
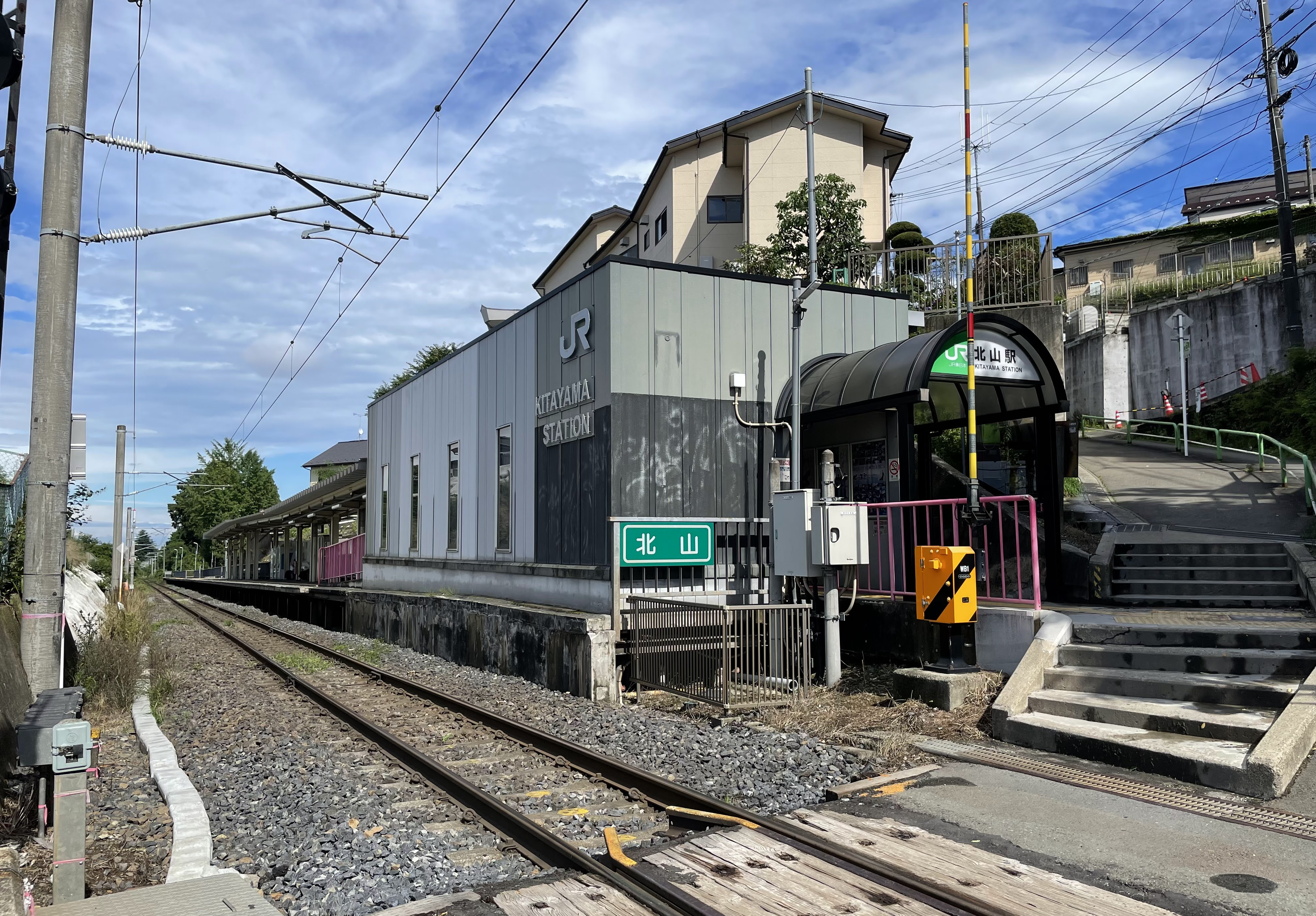
- Kitayama Station in July 2022

General information
- Location: 1-273 Kitayama, Aoba-ku, Sendai-shi, Miyagi-ken 981-0931; Japan
- Coordinates: 38°17′6″N 140°51′3″E
- Operator: JR East
- Line: ■ Senzan Line
- Distance: 6.5 km from Sendai
- Platforms: 1 side platform
- Tracks: 1

Other information
- Status: Staffed
- Website: Official website

History
- Opened: 1 February 1984

Passengers
- FY2018: 2499 daily

Services
Preceding station	JR East	Following station
Tōhokufukushidaimae towards Yamagata	Senzan Line Rapid C Local	Kita-Sendai towards Sendai
Location
- Location within Miyagi Prefecture Location within Japan

Kitayama Station (北山駅, Kitayama-eki) is a railway station in Aoba-ku, Sendai in Miyagi Prefecture, Japan, operated by East Japan Railway Company (JR East).

== Lines ==
Kitayama Station is served by the Senzan Line, and is located 6.5 rail kilometers from the terminus of the line at Sendai.

== Station layout ==
The station has one single side platform serving a sign bi-directional track. The station is staffed.

== History ==
Kitayama Station opened on 1 February 1984.

== Passenger statistics ==
In fiscal 2018, the station was used by an average of 2,499 passengers daily (boarding passengers only).

== Surrounding area ==
- Tohoku Fukushi University
- Kitayama Cemetery
- Sendai Aramaki Post Office
