= Kumagane Station =

Railway station in Sendai, Japan

Kumagane Station 熊ヶ根駅
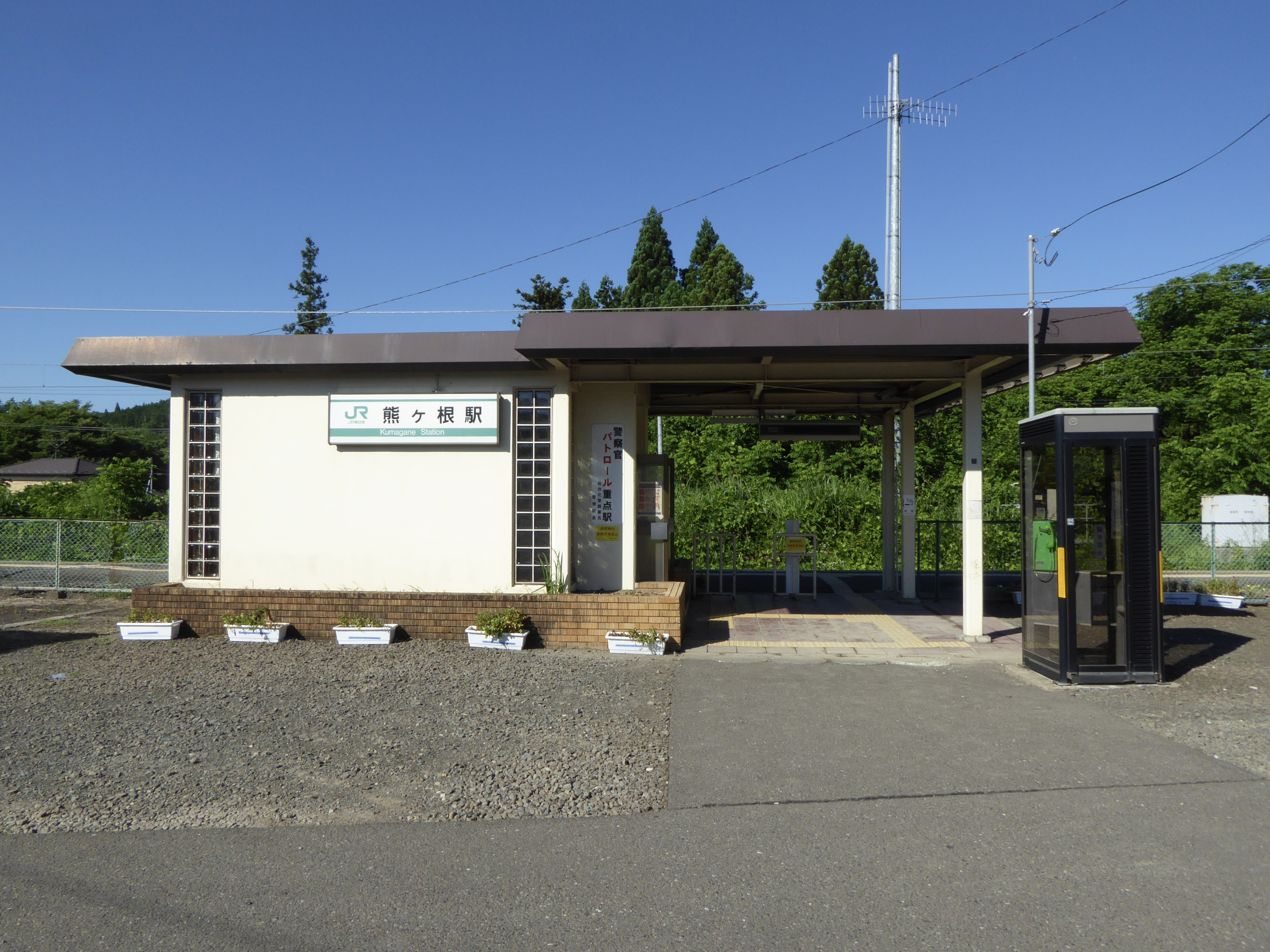
- Kumagane Station, July 2022

General information
- Location: Kumagane-aza Dan-no-hara 1-ban, Aoba-ku, Sendai-shi, Miyagi-ken 989-3432; Japan
- Coordinates: 38°17′52.6″N 140°40′50.7″E
- Operator: JR East
- Line: ■ Senzan Line
- Distance: 23.7 km from Sendai
- Platforms: 1 side platform
- Tracks: 1

Other information
- Status: Unstaffed
- Website: Official website

History
- Opened: 30 August 1931

Passengers
- FY 2007: 105 daily

Services
Preceding station	JR East	Following station
Sakunami towards Yamagata	Senzan Line Local	Rikuzen-Shirasawa towards Sendai
Location
- Location within Miyagi Prefecture Location within Japan

Kumagane Station (熊ヶ根駅, Kumagane-eki) is a railway station in Aoba-ku, Sendai, Miyagi Prefecture, Japan, operated by East Japan Railway Company (JR East).

== Lines ==
Kumagane Station is served by the Senzan Line, and is located 23.7 rail kilometers from the terminus of the line at Sendai.

== Station layout ==
The station has a one side platform, serving a single bi-directional track. The station is unattended.

== History ==
Kumagane Station opened on 30 August 1931. A new station building was completed in August 1983. The station was absorbed into the JR East network upon the privatization of JNR on 1 April 1987.

== Surrounding area ==
- Kumagane Post Office
