= Omoshiroyama-Kōgen Station =

Railway station in Yamagata, Japan

Omoshiroyama-Kōgen Station 面白山高原駅
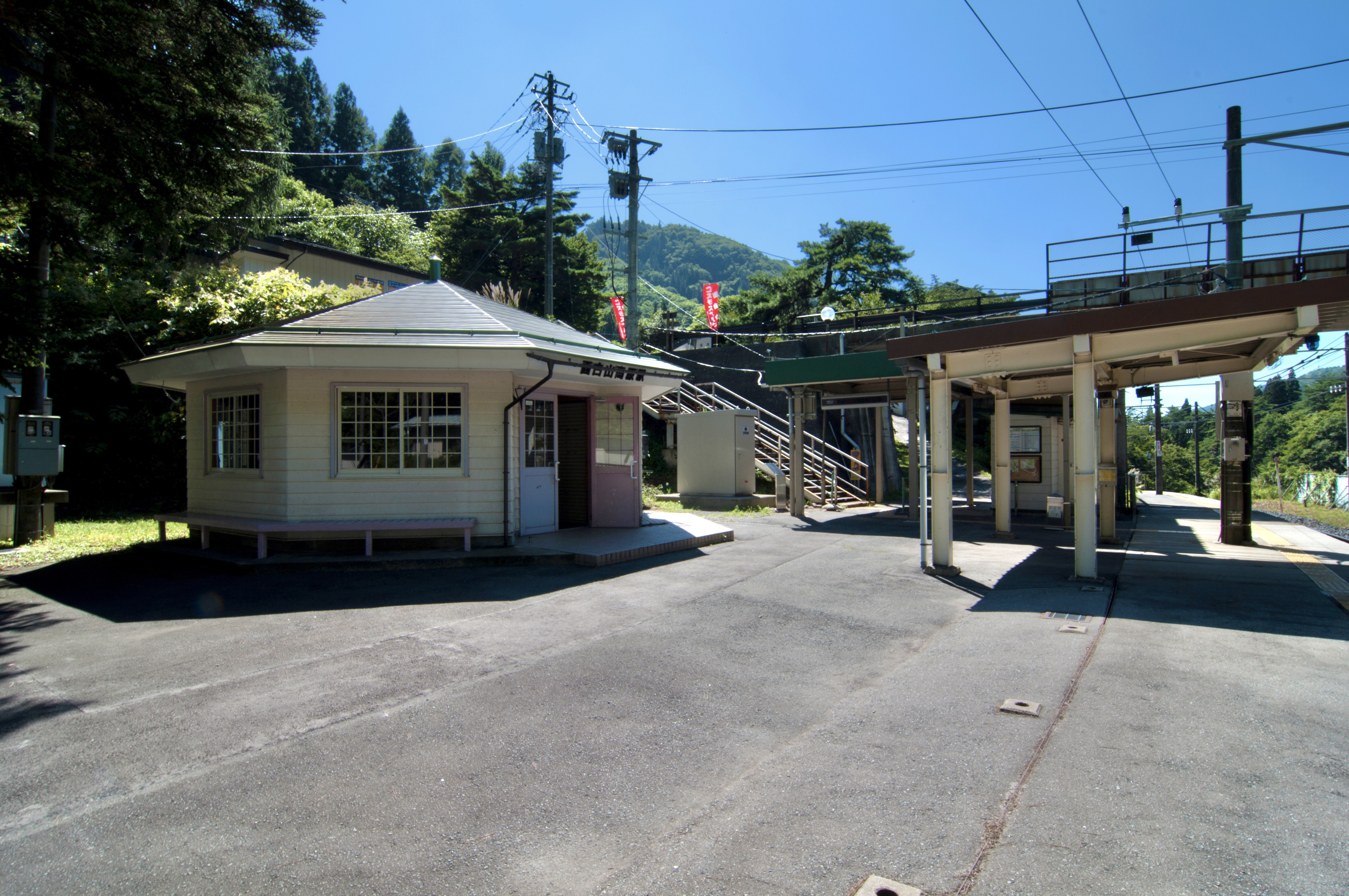
- Omoshiroyama-Kōgen Station, September 2010

General information
- Location: Yamadera-aze 8387 Omoshiroyama, Yamagata-shi, Yamagata-ken 999-3301; Japan
- Coordinates: 38°19′58″N 140°29′47″E
- Operator: JR East
- Line: ■ Senzan Line
- Distance: 42.5 km from Sendai
- Platforms: 1 side platform

Other information
- Status: Unstaffed

History
- Opened: April 1, 1987
- Former names: Omoshiroyama (until 1988)

Services
Preceding station	JR East	Following station
Yamadera towards Yamagata	Senzan Line Local	Okunikkawa towards Sendai
Location
- Location within Yamagata Prefecture Location within Japan

Omoshiroyama-Kōgen Station (面白山高原駅, Omoshiroyama-Kōgen-eki) is a railway station in the city of Yamagata, Yamagata Prefecture, Japan, operated by East Japan Railway Company (JR East).

== Lines ==
Omoshiroyama-Kōgen Station is served by the Senzan Line, and is located 42.5 rail kilometers from the terminus of the line at Sendai Station.

== Station layout ==
The station has one side platform, serving a single bi-directional track. The station is unstaffed.

== History ==
Omoshiroyama-Kōgen Station opened on November 10, 1937 as the Omoshiroyama Provisional Station (面白山仮乗降場, Omoshiro Kaijōkyōjō). The station was absorbed into the JR East network upon the privatization of JNR on April 1, 1987. It was renamed to its present name on March 13, 1988.

== Surrounding area ==
Omoshiroyama-Kōgen skiing area is nearby. A ski lift carries passengers between the station and the ski slope. In the summer, the station is accessible by automobile, but in the winter season the roads are usually closed.

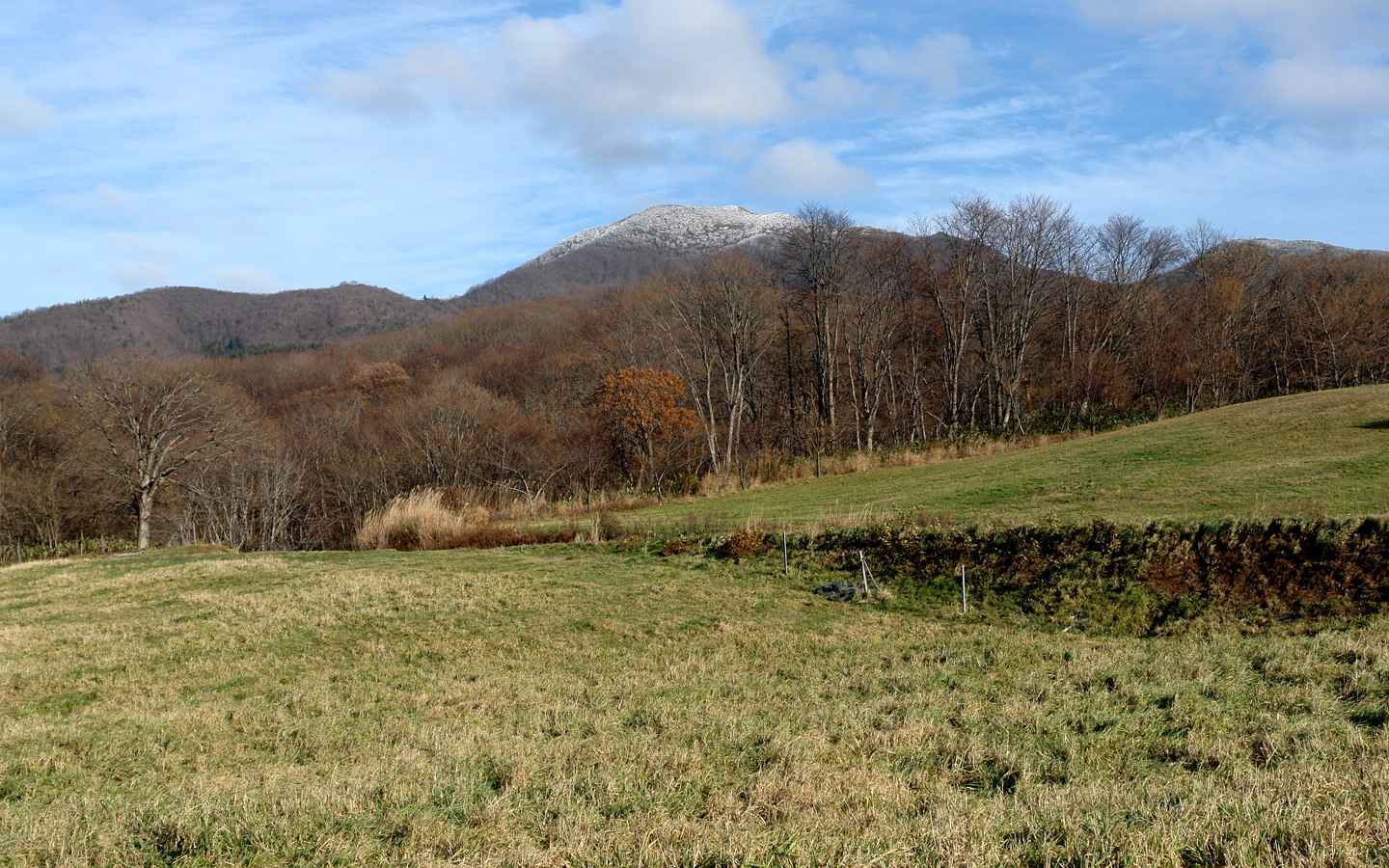
Mt.Omoshiroyama

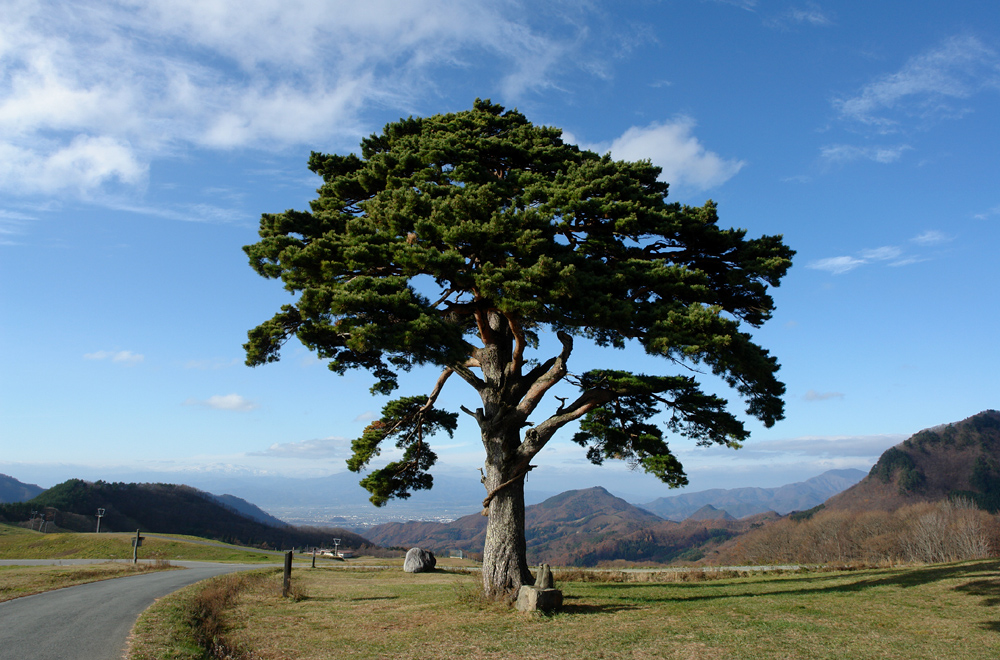
Omoshiroyama Highland

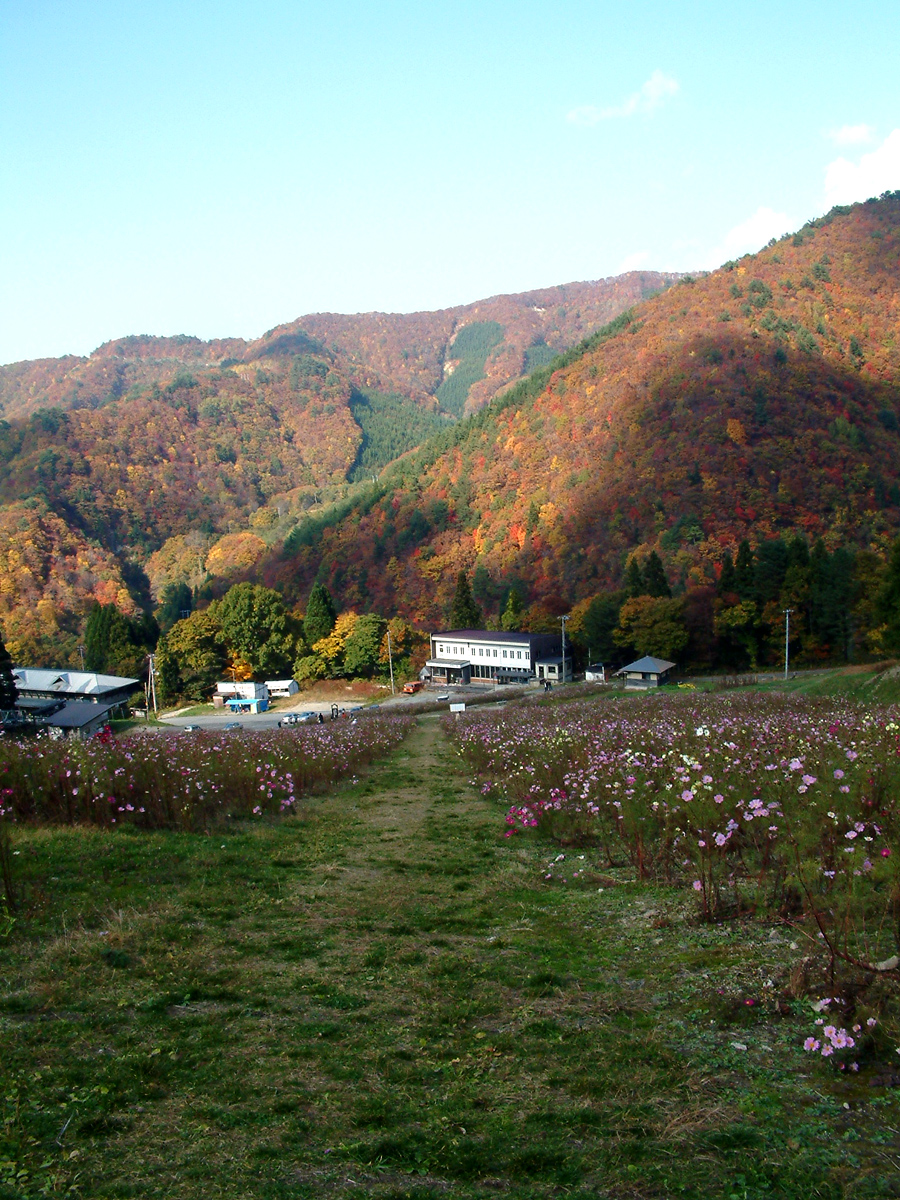
Cosmos Berg

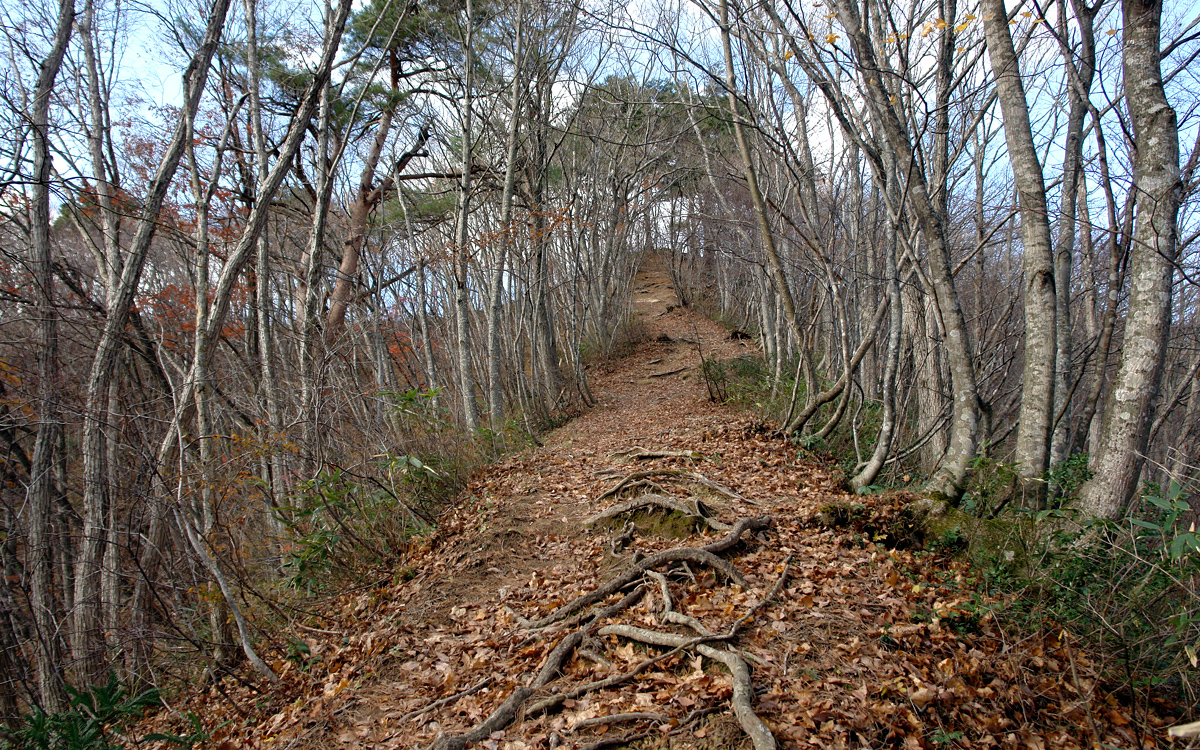
Slope

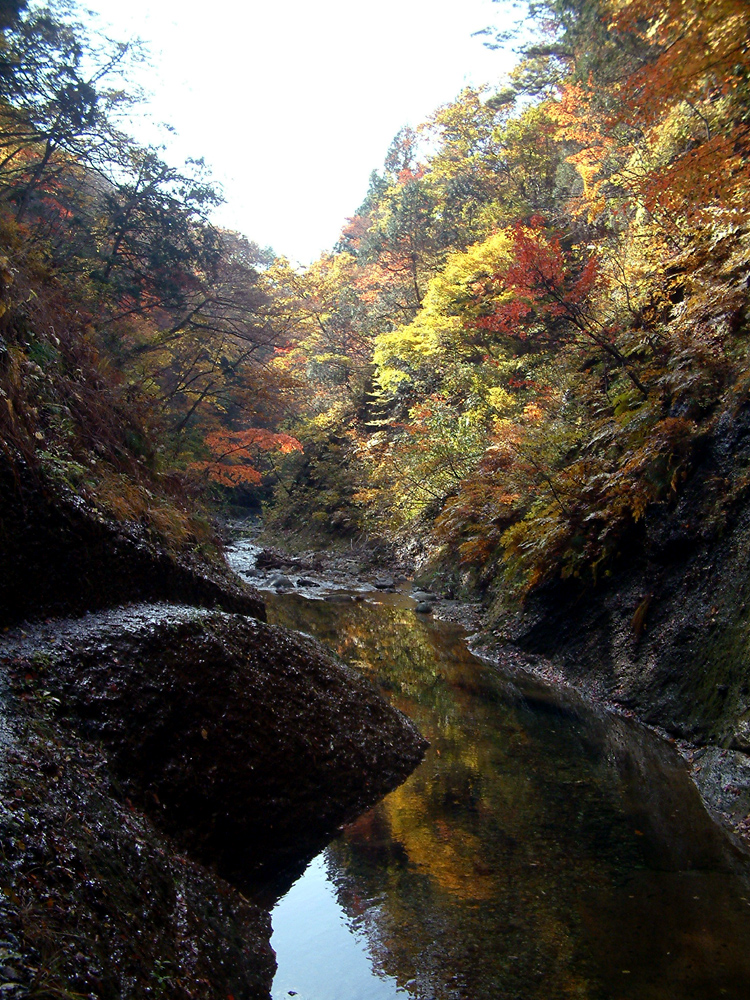
Valley

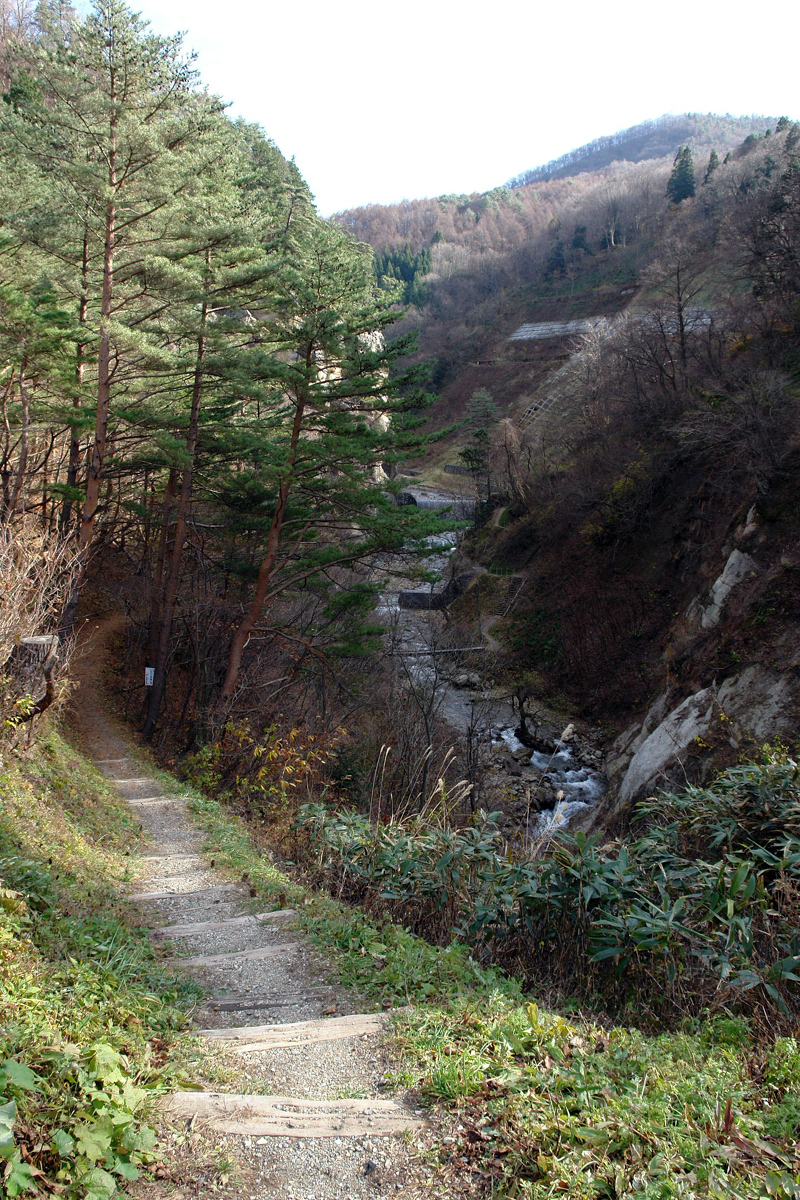
Station back

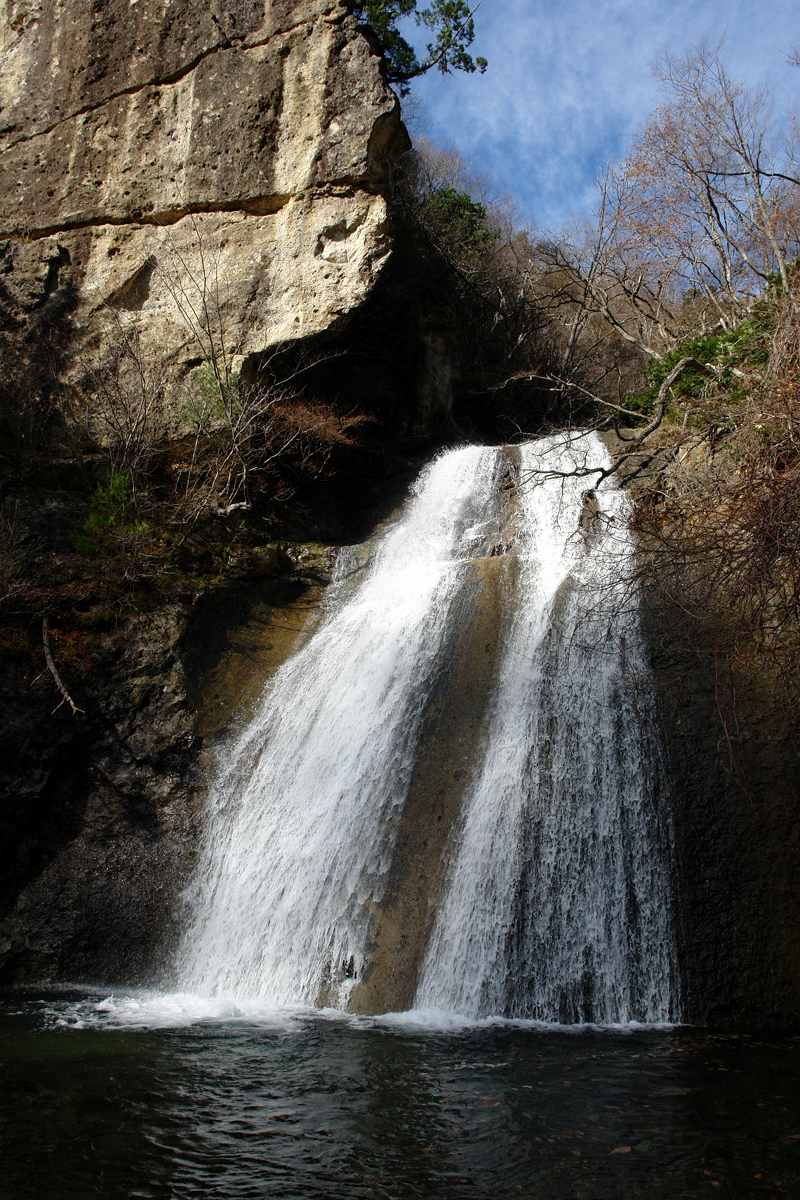
Arare Falls

== See also ==
- List of railway stations in Japan
