= Yatsumori Station =

Former railway station in Sendai, Japan

Coordinates: 38°18′32.5″N 140°36′55.5″E

Yatsumori Station 八ツ森駅
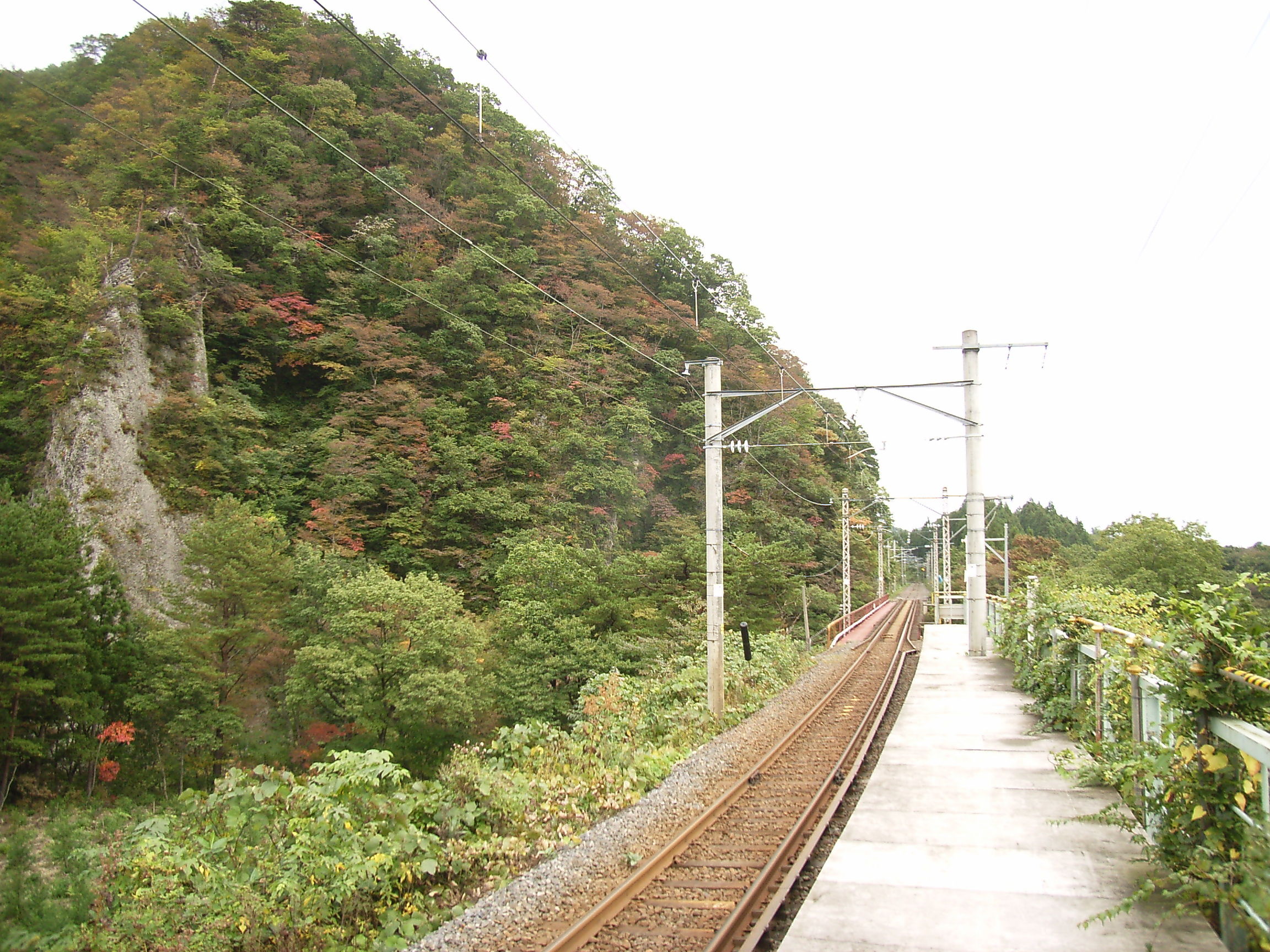
- Platform of Yatsumori Station, October 2005

General information
- Location: Nikkawa-aze, Aoba, Sendai, Miyagi （宮城県仙台市青葉区新川字清水頭） Japan
- Operator: JR East
- Line: Senzan Line

History
- Opened: 10 November 1937
- Closed: 14 March 2014
Location

Yatsumori Station (八ツ森駅, Yatsumori eki) was a JR East railway station located in Aoba-ku, Sendai, Japan. Since May 2002, this station had not been operational.

== History ==
On November 10, 1937, the station began operation as a temporary stop. On March 31, 1987, the station was reclassified as a seasonal station. Since May 2002, trains have not stopped at this station. The station was officially closed as of March 15, 2014 (March 14 being the last day).

== Lines ==
Yatsumori Station was served by the Senzan Line, and was 30.8 rail kilometers from the terminus of the line at Sendai Station.

== Station layout ==
Yatsumori Station had a single side platform serving traffic in both directions.

== Surrounding area ==
Yatsumori Station was originally opened to serve the nearby Yatsumori Ski Resort. There are currently no houses or buildings within several hundred meters of the station.
