= Takase Station (Yamagata) =

Railway station in Yamagata, Yamagata Prefecture, Japan

Takase Station 高瀬駅
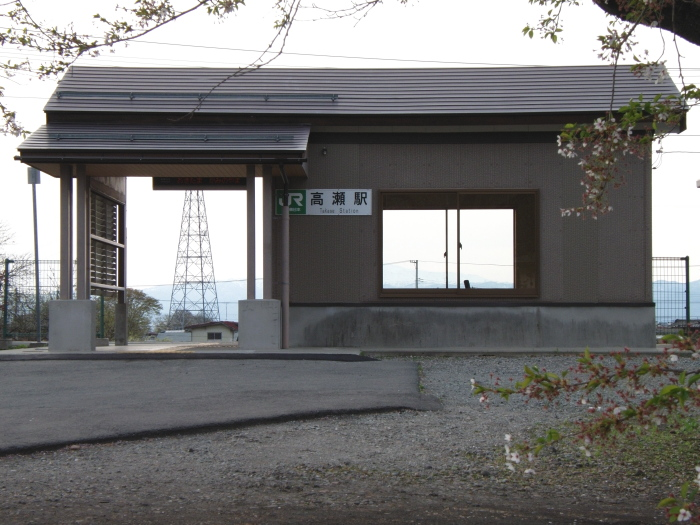
- Takase Station in April 2009

General information
- Location: 132 Shimo-Higashiyama, Yamagata-shi, Yamagata-ken 990-2232; Japan
- Coordinates: 38°18′6″N 140°23′46″E
- Operator: JR East
- Line: ■ Senzan Line
- Distance: 52.4 km from Sendai
- Platforms: 1 side platform

Other information
- Status: Unstaffed

History
- Opened: July 1, 1950

Services
Preceding station	JR East	Following station
Tateyama towards Yamagata	Senzan Line Rapid B Local	Yamadera towards Sendai
Location
- Location within Yamagata Prefecture Location within Japan

Takase Station (高瀬駅, Takase-eki) is a railway station in the city of Yamagata, Yamagata Prefecture, Japan, operated by East Japan Railway Company (JR East).

== Lines ==
Takase Station is served by the Senzan Line, and is located 52.4 rail kilometers from the terminus of the line at Sendai Station.

== Station layout ==
The station has one side platform serving a single bi-directional track. The station is unattended.

== History ==
Takase Station opened on July 1, 1950. The station was absorbed into the JR East network upon the privatization of JNR on April 1, 1987. A new station building was completed in 1999.

== Surrounding area ==
- Murayama-Takase Post Office

== See also ==
- List of railway stations in Japan
