= Ayashi Station =

Railway station in Sendai, Japan

Ayashi Station 愛子駅
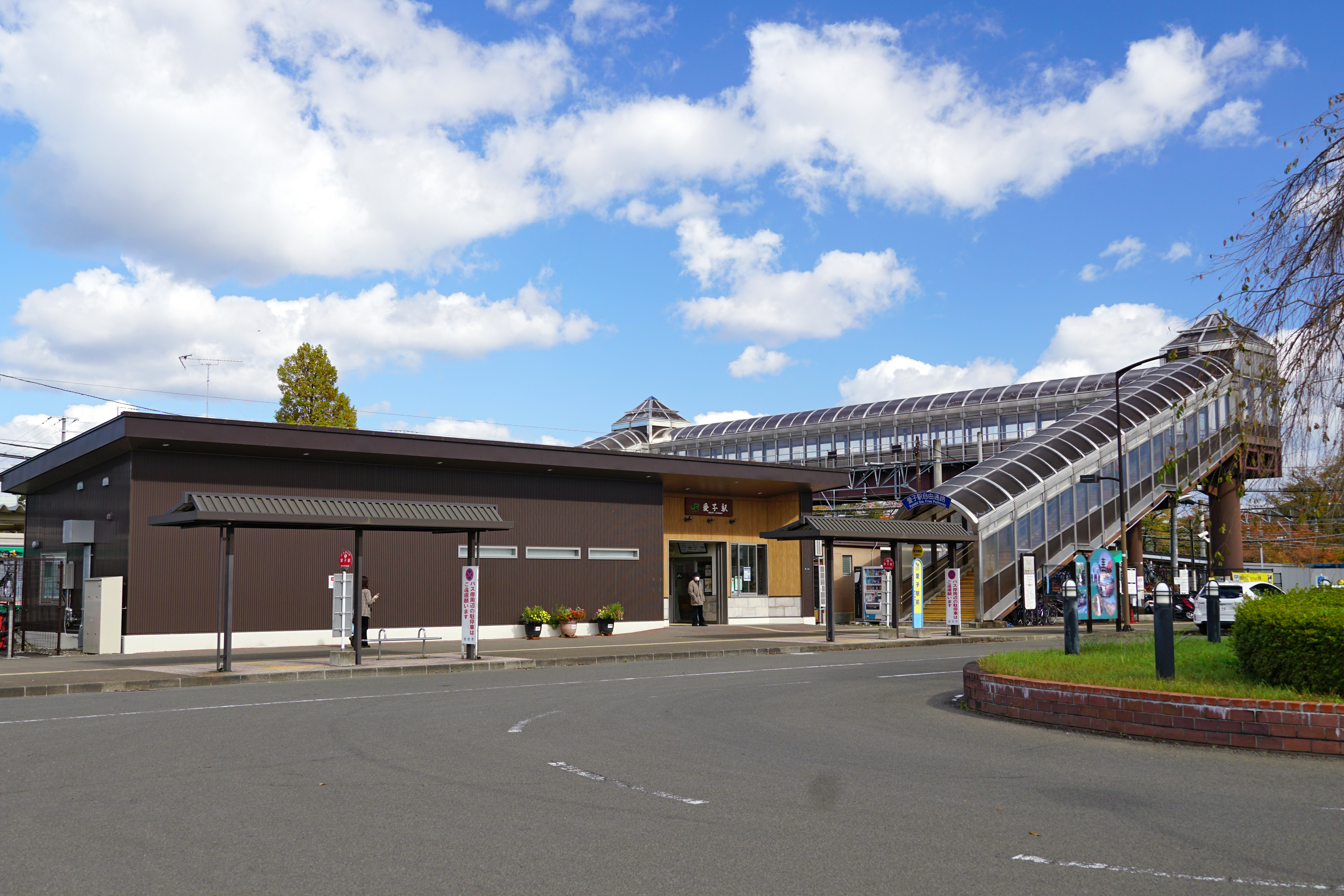
- Ayashi Station in October 2021, after rebuilding

General information
- Location: 8-1, Ayashi-Chūō 1-chōme, Aoba-ku, Sendai-shi, Miyagi-ken 989-3128; Japan
- Coordinates: 38°16′21.5″N 140°45′42″E
- Operator: JR East
- Line: ■ Senzan Line
- Distance: 15.2 km from Sendai
- Platforms: 1 side + 1 island platform
- Tracks: 3

Other information
- Status: Staffed ("Midori no Madoguchi")
- Website: Official website

History
- Opened: 29 September 1929
- Rebuilt: 2018

Passengers
- FY2018: 4,184 daily

Services
Preceding station	JR East	Following station
Sakunami towards Yamagata	Senzan Line Rapid A B C	Rikuzen-Ochiai towards Sendai
Rikuzen-Shirasawa towards Yamagata	Senzan Line Local	Rikuzen-Ochiai towards Sendai
Location
- Location within Miyagi Prefecture Location within Japan

Ayashi Station (愛子駅, Ayashi-eki) is a railway station on the Senzan Line in Aoba-ku, Sendai in Miyagi Prefecture, Japan, operated by East Japan Railway Company (JR East). The station also uses the moniker "Entrance to the Akiu Hot Springs" (秋保温泉口, Akiu Onsen Guchi).

The kanji characters for Ayashi are the same characters as in the name Aiko given to the daughter of the Crown Prince of Japan. When she was born on December 1, 2001, over a thousand people came to the station to purchase platform tickets as a commemorative souvenir. From April to November 2001, only 124 tickets were sold at the station but from December 7 to December 28, 2001, about 84,000 tickets were sold at the station. JR East began selling commemorative tickets on January 1, 2002, to honor the event showing the station. Each ticket was stamped with the station name and date of purchase automatically.

== Lines ==
Ayashi Station is served by the Senzan Line, and is located 15.2 kilometers from the terminus of the line at Sendai.

== Station layout ==
The station has one side platform and one island platform connected to the station building by a footbridge. The station has a "Midori no Madoguchi" staffed ticket office.

=== Platforms ===
1	■ Senzan Line	for Sakunami, Yamadera, and Yamagata
2, 3	■ Senzan Line	for Kita-Sendai and Sendai

== History ==
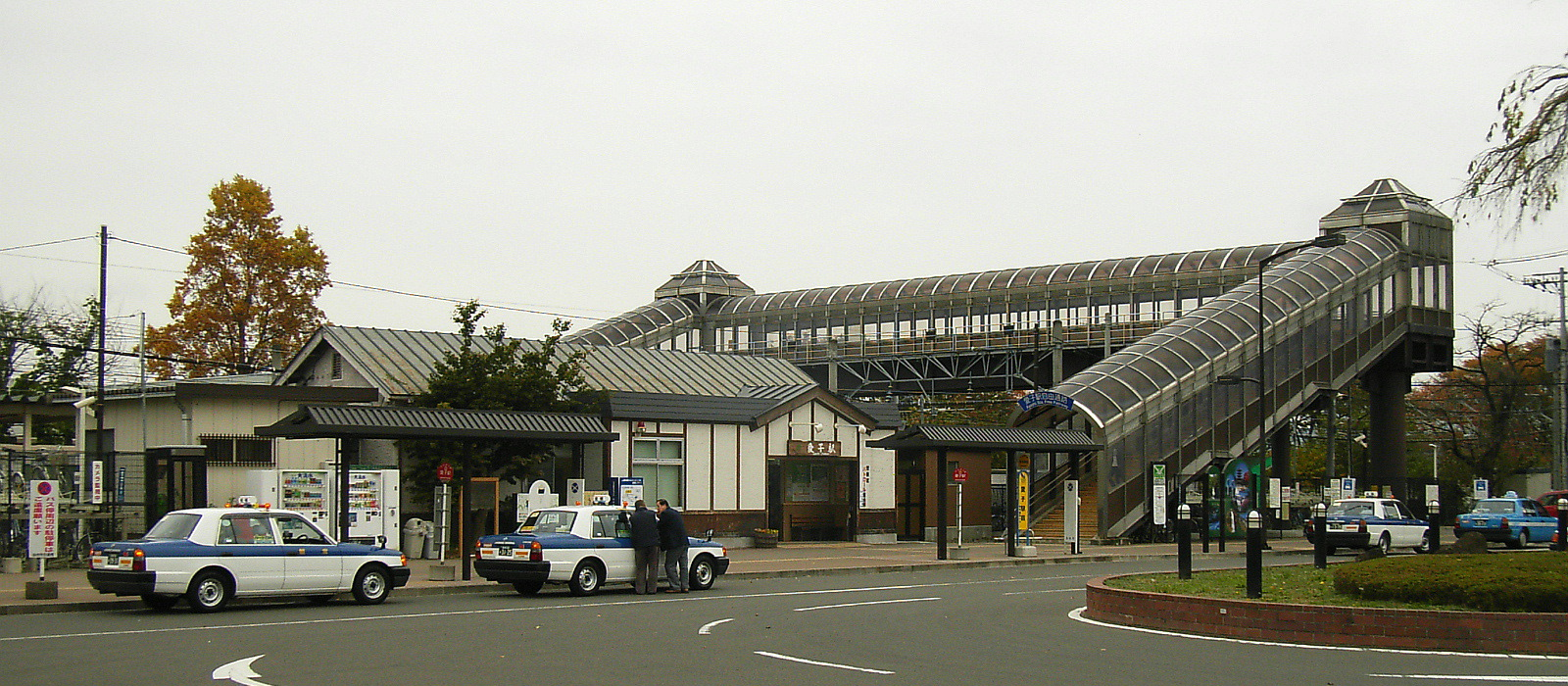
Ayashi Station in November 2005

The station opened on 29 September 1929. The station was absorbed into the JR East network upon the privatization of Japanese National Railways (JNR) on 1 April 1987.

== Passenger statistics ==
In fiscal 2018, the station was used by an average of 4,184 passengers daily (boarding passengers only).

== Surrounding area ==
- Ayashi Daibutsu, Bukkokuji

== See also ==
- List of railway stations in Japan
