= Senzan Line =

Railway line in Japan

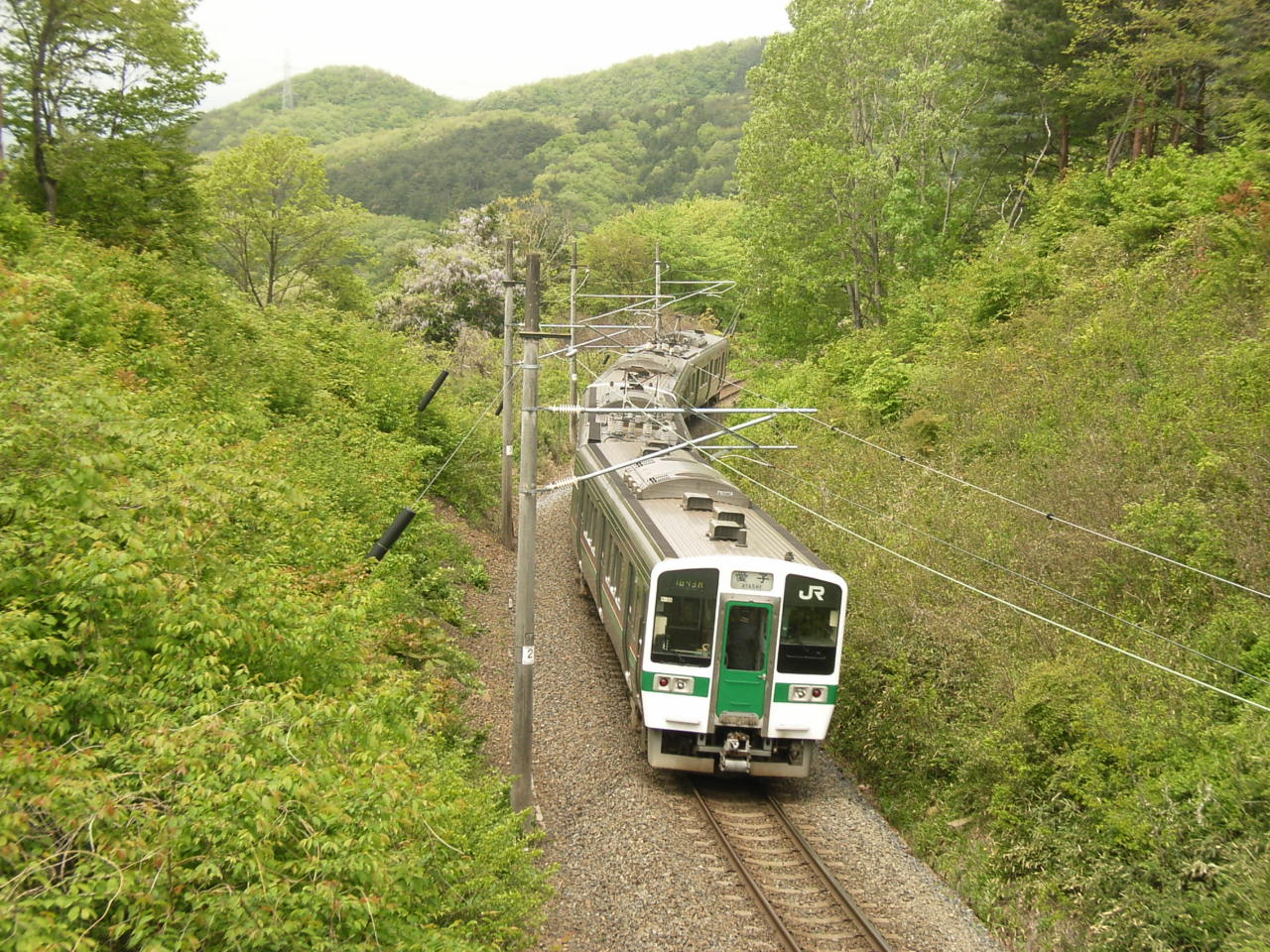
- Ayashi-bound Senzan Line train west of Kuzuoka Station

Overview
- Locale: Miyagi and Yamagata prefectures
- Termini: Sendai; Yamagata
- Stations: 18

Service
- Operator: JR East

History
- Opened: 29 September 1929; 97 years ago

Technical
- Line length: Sendai–Uzen-Chitose: 58 km (36 mi)
- Track gauge: 1,067 mm (3 ft 6 in)
- Electrification: Overhead line, 20 kV 50 Hz AC
Route map
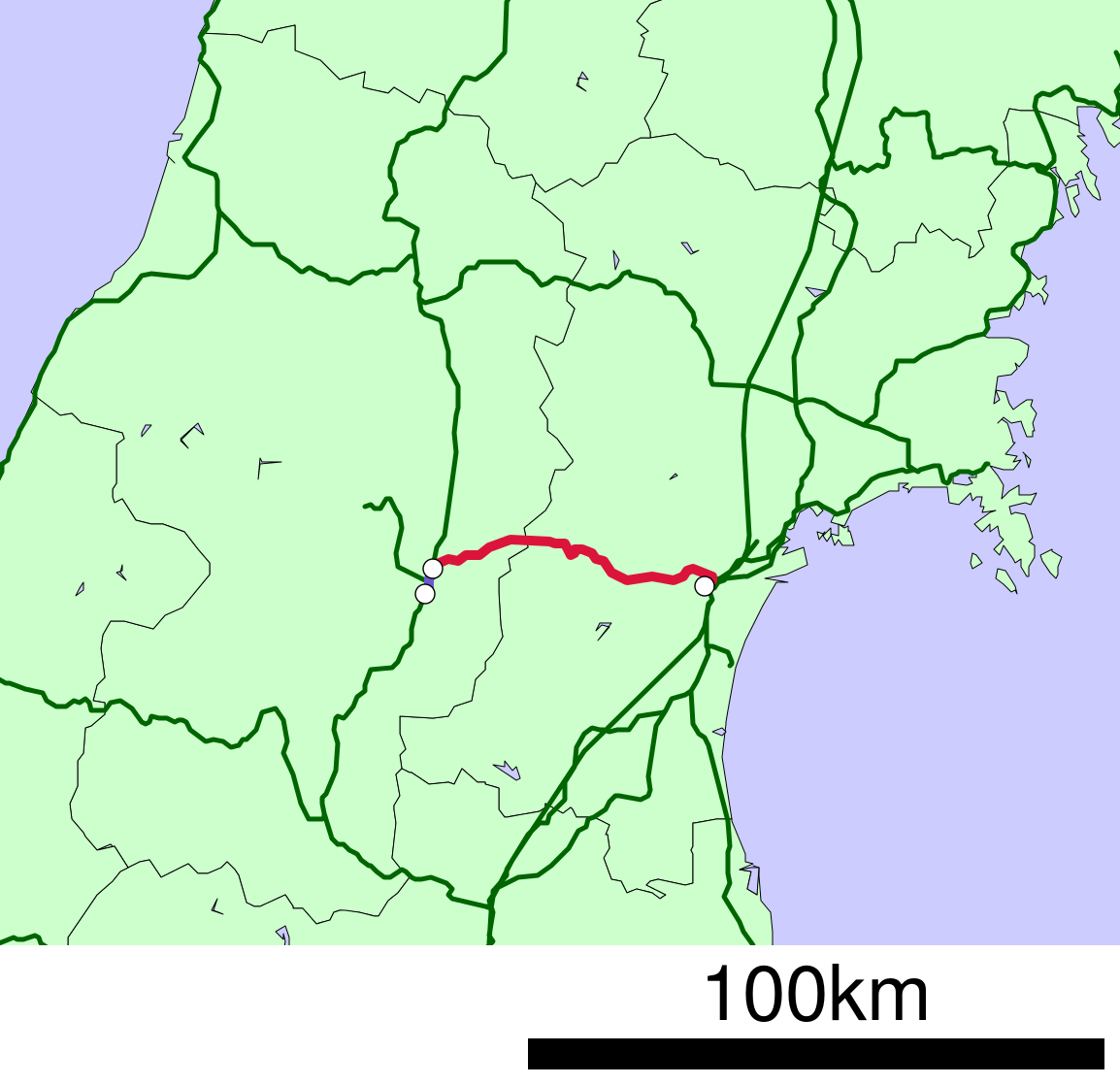

The Senzan Line (Japanese: 仙山線, Hepburn: Senzan-sen) is a railway line in Japan. Part of the East Japan Railway Company (JR East) system, it runs from Sendai Station in Sendai, Miyagi Prefecture to Uzen-Chitose Station in Yamagata, Yamagata Prefecture, acting as a connector between the Tōhoku Main Line/Tōhoku Shinkansen and the Ōu Main Line in southern Tōhoku. It also provides access to western Miyagi Prefecture and eastern Yamagata Prefecture. It connects with the Tōhoku Shinkansen, Tōhoku Main Line and Senseki Line at Sendai Station, the Ōu Main Line at Uzen-Chitose, Kita-Yamagata, and Yamagata Stations in Yamagata, Yamagata, the Aterazawa Line at Kita-Yamagata and Yamagata Stations, and the Yamagata Shinkansen at Yamagata Station. The name "Senzan" (仙山) takes the first Kanji characters from the two cities that the line connects: Sendai (仙台) and Yamagata (山形).

== History ==
- September 29, 1929: Senzan East Line begins operation (Sendai — Ayashi). Kita-Sendai, Rikuzen-Ochiai, and Ayashi Stations open.
- August 30, 1931: Ayashi — Sakunami connection opens. Rikuzen-Shirasawa, Kumagane, and Sakunami Stations open.
- October 17, 1933: Senzan West Line begins operation (Uzen-Chitose — Yamadera). Yamadera Station opens.
- November 10, 1937: Sakunami — Yamadera connection opens. Senzan Line connects Sendai and Uzen-Chitose Stations. Sakunami — Yamadera tracks are electrified (1,500 V DC). Oku-Nikkawa Station opens. Omoshiroyama signal box begins operation. Temporary stations Yatsumori and Omoshiroyama open.
- July 1, 1950: Takase Station opens.
- August 10, 1955: Rikuzen-Ochiai — Kumagane tracks are electrified (20 kV 50 Hz AC).
- September 5, 1957: Sendai — Rikuzen-Ochiai, Kumagane — Sakunami tracks are electrified (20 kV 50 Hz AC). ED45 (ED91) electric locomotive enters service.
- November 1, 1960: Yamadera — Uzen-Chitose (— Yamagata) is electrified (1,500 V DC). "Asahi" and "Gassan" semi-expresses begin operation.
- October 1, 1963: "Senzan" semi-express begins operation.
- March 5, 1966: "Asahi" and "Gassan" become expresses.
- September 8, 1968: Sakunami — Uzen-Chitose (— Yamagata) switched to 20 kV 50 Hz AC electrification. ED78 electric locomotive begins operation
- October 1, 1968: "Senzan" semi-express becomes an express.
- 1971: Kumagane Station becomes unstaffed.
- October 2, 1978: "Senzan" express begins making stops at Ayashi station.
- May 1, 1982: "Asahi" express becomes "Benibana".
- November 15, 1982: "Senzan" express becomes a rapid train. "Gassan" ceases operations within the Senzan Line.
- February 1, 1984: Kitayama and Kunimi Stations open. Third platform built at Ayashi Station.
- March 14, 1985: Senzan Line utilizes CTC. Rikuzen-Ochiai, Rikuzen-Shirasawa, Sakunami, Oku-Nikkawa, and Tateyama Stations become unstaffed.
- March 1, 1987: Some staff from Sendai Station are transferred to Kitayama and Rikuzen-Ochiai Stations.
- March 20, 1987: Some staff from Sendai Station are transferred to Kunimi Station.
- March 21, 1987: Nishi-Sendai Hi-Land Station opens as a temporary station.
- April 1, 1987: Senzan Line becomes part of JR East and JR Freight.
- June 20, 1987: Train exchange equipment service is started at Kunimi Station.
- March 13, 1988: Omoshiroyama Temporary Station becomes a station and is renamed Omoshiroyama-Kōgen Station.
- November 18, 1988: Tōshōgū Station opens.
- March 10, 1990: 719 series EMUs enter service on the Senzan Line.
- September 1, 1990: The "Tsugaru" express continues operations on the Senzan Line due to construction of the Yamagata Shinkansen.
- March 16, 1991: Kuzuoka Station opens.
- August 27, 1991: "Tsubasa" express is diverted over the Senzan Line due to construction of the Yamagata Shinkansen.
- July 1, 1992: Diversion of the "Tsubasa" express over the Senzan Line ceases with the completion of the Yamagata Shinkansen.
- December 1, 1993: "Tsugaru" express ceases operations.
- October 1998: Freight services temporarily stop.
- December 1999: The Senzan Line up to Uzen-Chitose is converted to double-track with the expansion of the Yamagata Shinkansen.
- April 1, 2001: The "Senzan" Weekend Rapid becomes the "Holiday Senzan". 455 series EMUs are replaced by 719 series trains formerly used on the Tōhoku Main Line.
- December 1, 2001: ATS-Ps emergency train stop system is introduced in the Sendai — Ayashi area.
- April 1, 2002: Freight services cease on the Senzan Line.
- October 16, 2004: The names "Senzan" and "Holiday Senzan" for the rapid trains are discontinued. Rapid trains make more frequent stops at Kunimi, Rikuzen-Ochiai, and Uzen-Chitose.
- October 14, 2017: Regular operation of the 701 series EMUs on the Senzan Line ends.

=== Former connecting lines ===
- Toshogu station - A 762mm (2'6") gauge line, ultimately extending 44 km between Tori-Machi and Nishi-Furukawa station on the Rikuu East Line, was opened by the Sendai City Council between 1922 and 1929. It closed in sections between 1937 and 1960.

== Services ==
All trains which are bound for Yamagata Station run through to Yamagata Station via Ou Main Line between Uzen-Chitose and Yamagata Stations. As of the March 2018 timetable revision, all trains on the Senzan Line operate in 4-car or 6-car formations.

=== Rapid ===
Some Senzan Line trains run as rapid trains. All trains stop at the following stations:

- All stations until Ayashi (Tōshōgu, Kita-Sendai, Kitayama, Tōhoku-Fukushidaimae, Kunimi, Kuzuoka, Rikuzen-Ochiai and Ayashi)
- Sakunami
- Yamadera
- Uzen-Chitose
- Kita-Yamagata
- Yamagata

At one point, there was a G-Rapid that stopped at the most stations out of all rapid trains, but was considered too confusing by passengers and soon put out of service. Instead, the number of Local Trains were increased. Until 2004, there were only three types of rapids (A, B, C). Also, until September 30, 2003, there was a Special Rapid "Holiday Senzan" that used to run on Saturdays and weekends.

With the opening of the Sendai Airport Line (established in 2006), the Senzan Line was expected to have Sendai Airport-bound trains. But they have not connected with the direct train at this time.

In the 18 March 2023 timetable change, all of the previous Rapid services were abolished and only one type of rapid train runs now. Before the change, the previous types were: Rapid A, B, C, D, E and F.

=== Local ===
There are three types of local train service: Sendai — Yamagata, Sendai — Sakunami and Sendai — Ayashi.

Sendai ー Sakunami local trains run only in the morning, two Sendai-bound trains and one Sakunami-bound train.

=== Sendai — Ayashi ===
Since this part of the line is located in the central suburban area of Sendai, there are many commuters, and there are typically 2-4 Sendai — Ayashi trains every hour. Although there were fewer trains going from Ayashi to Sendai, the numbers have increased in recent years. The section is double-track and the interchange stations are Kita-Sendai, Kunimi, and Rikuzen-Ochiai. Presently, parts of the track are being elevated and there are plans to build a new station near the Shin-Ishinomaki Highway railroad crossing.

=== Ayashi — Yamagata ===
Before the abolition of the Saturday/weekend schedule, there was one Saturday/weekend return train from Sakunami that stopped at Nishi-Sendai Hi-Land, however, there have been no stops at Nishi-Sendai Hi-Land Station since 2004.

Local trains are scheduled around the rapid train schedules. However, trips to the Sakunami Hot Springs as well as the Yamadera temple well known from Matsuo Bashō's Oku no Hosomichi are popular. Also, during the ski-season, the only way to get to places such as Omoshiroyama is the train and there are a great number of passengers during the tourist season. However, to prevent delays caused by heavy snow, some early morning and late-night local trains pass through Oku-Nikkawa and Omoshiroyama-Kōgen stations without stopping during the winter months, a practice that began in January 2022.

There are two temporary stations, but as there have been no stops at Nishi-Sendai Hi-Land and Yatsumori since October 2004 and June 2003, respectively. These two stations are abolished on March 14, 2014.

=== Tōhoku Main Line ===
There are only two trains that share both the Senzan and Tōhoku Main Lines' tracks: Senzan Line 2832M, which runs from Sakunami Station to Sendai where it becomes 1428M and continues on the Tōhoku Main Line tracks until Iwanuma, and Tōhoku Main Line 425M, which originates in Shiroishi, changes to 1831M at Sendai, and continues on the Senzan Line tracks to Ayashi. The Sakunami — Iwanuma train runs only on Saturdays and weekends.

There used to be many more trains that utilized the Tōhoku Main Line's tracks, but the numbers have decreased in recent years. Past trains went to such places as Fukushima, Matsushima, and Kogota. After 2001, the numbers began going down until they reached two trains, which is the number. It was expected that that number would increase in 2006, though, when the Sendai Airport Line opens.

And now, no train runs through to Tohoku Main Line or Sendai Airport Access Line.

== Station list ==
Station name	Japanese	Distance (km)	Rapid			Transfers		Location
Station name	Japanese	Distance (km)	A	B	C	Transfers		Location
Sendai	仙台	0.0	●	●	●	Tōhoku Shinkansen; Akita Shinkansen; ■ Tōhoku Main Line; ■ Senseki Line; ■ Jōban Line; ■ Sendai Subway Namboku Line; ■ Sendai Subway Tōzai Line	∨	Aoba-ku, Sendai, Miyagi Prefecture
Tōshōgū	東照宮	3.2	|	|	●		｜	Aoba-ku, Sendai, Miyagi Prefecture
Kita-Sendai	北仙台	4.8	●	●	●	■ Sendai Subway Namboku Line	◇	Aoba-ku, Sendai, Miyagi Prefecture
Kitayama	北山	6.5	|	|	●		｜	Aoba-ku, Sendai, Miyagi Prefecture
Tōhokufukushidaimae	東北福祉大前	7.5	|	|	●		｜	Aoba-ku, Sendai, Miyagi Prefecture
Kunimi	国見	8.6	●	●	●		◇	Aoba-ku, Sendai, Miyagi Prefecture
Kuzuoka	葛岡	10.1	|	|	●		｜	Aoba-ku, Sendai, Miyagi Prefecture
Rikuzen-Ochiai	陸前落合	12.7	●	●	●		◇	Aoba-ku, Sendai, Miyagi Prefecture
Ayashi	愛子	15.2	●	●	●		◇	Aoba-ku, Sendai, Miyagi Prefecture
Rikuzen-Shirasawa	陸前白沢	20.6	|	|	|		◇	Aoba-ku, Sendai, Miyagi Prefecture
Kumagane	熊ヶ根	23.7	|	|	|		｜	Aoba-ku, Sendai, Miyagi Prefecture
~~Nishi-Sendai-Hairando~~	西仙台ハイランド	25.3	|	|	|	Station officially closed on March 14, 2014		Aoba-ku, Sendai, Miyagi Prefecture
Sakunami	作並	28.7	●	●	●		◇	Aoba-ku, Sendai, Miyagi Prefecture
~~Yatsumori~~	八ツ森	30.8	|	|	|	Station officially closed on March 14, 2014	◇	Aoba-ku, Sendai, Miyagi Prefecture
Oku-Nikkawa	奥新川	33.8	|	|	|		◇	Aoba-ku, Sendai, Miyagi Prefecture
Omoshiroyama-Kōgen	面白山高原	42.5	|	|	|		｜	Yamagata, Yamagata Prefecture
Yamadera	山寺	48.7	●	●	●		◇	Yamagata, Yamagata Prefecture
Takase	高瀬	52.4	|	●	|		｜	Yamagata, Yamagata Prefecture
Tateyama	楯山	54.9	|	●	|		◇	Yamagata, Yamagata Prefecture
Uzen-Chitose	羽前千歳	58.0	●	●	●	■ Ōu Main Line (Yamagata Line)	｜	Yamagata, Yamagata Prefecture
Kita-Yamagata	北山形	61.9	●	●	●	■ Ōu Main Line; ■ Aterazawa Line	◇	Yamagata, Yamagata Prefecture
Yamagata	山形	62.8	●	●	●	Yamagata Shinkansen; ■ Ōu Main Line; ■ Aterazawa Line	∧	Yamagata, Yamagata Prefecture

=== Notes ===
- Trains can pass one another at stations marked "◇", "∨", and "∧" and cannot pass at stations marked "｜".
- Nishi-Sendai Hi Land and Yatsumori Stations were officially closed on March 14, 2014. The stations were not operational since early 2000s and even in the past only open during certain times of the year. [1]
- From Uzen-Chitose to Yamagata, the Senzan Line operates on the tracks of the Ōu Line.
- The D-Rapid is Sendai-bound, while the E-Rapid is Yamagata-bound
