= Yamadera Station =

Railway station in Yamagata, Yamagata Prefecture, Japan

Yamadera Station 山寺駅
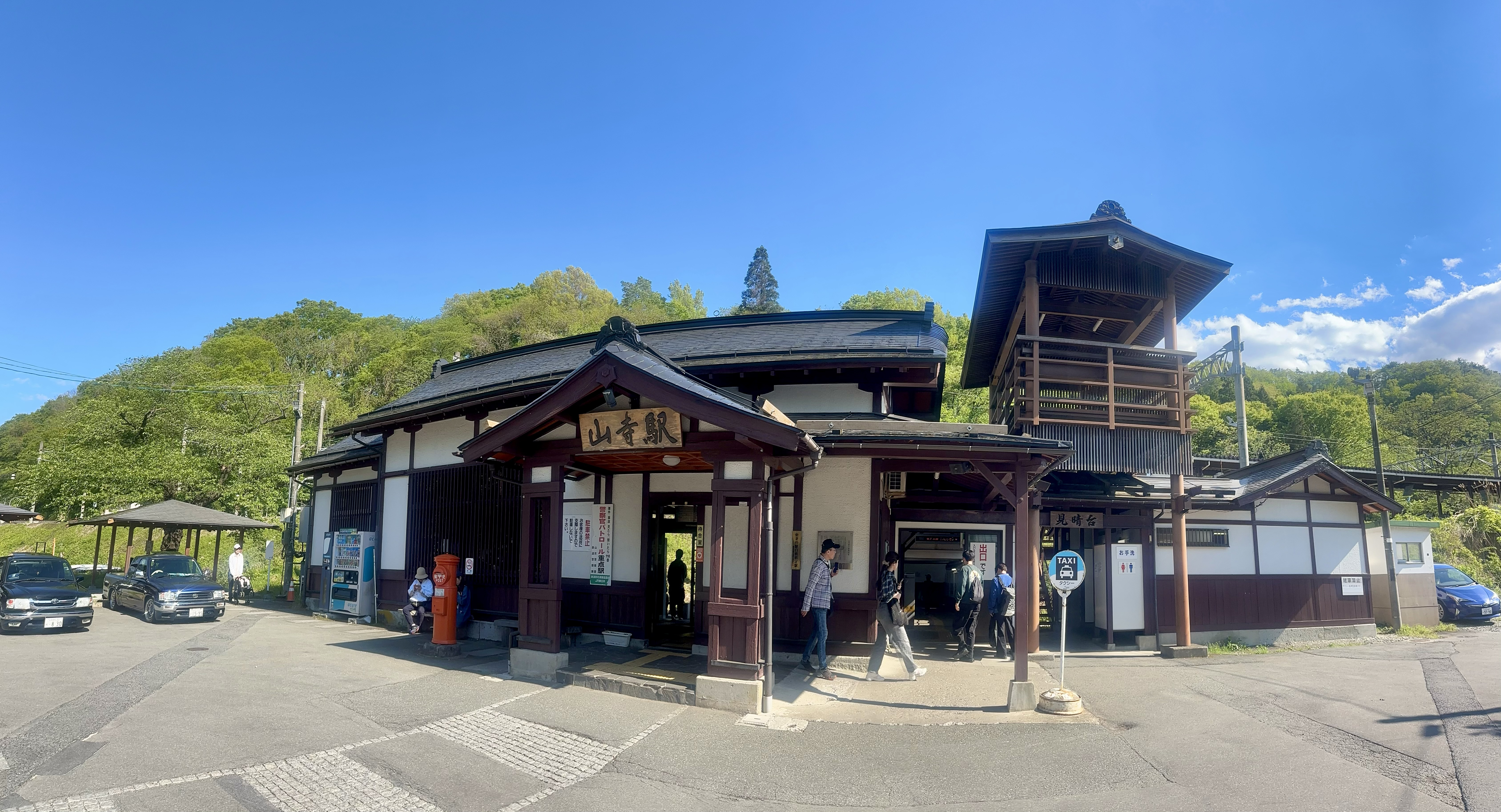
- Yamadera Station in May 2026

General information
- Location: 4273 Yamadera, Yamagata-shi, Yamagata-ken 999-3301; Japan
- Coordinates: 38°18′35″N 140°26′06″E
- Operator: JR East
- Line: ■ Senzan Line
- Distance: 48.7 km from Sendai
- Platforms: 1 island platform

Other information
- Status: Staffed (Midori no Madoguchi )

History
- Opened: October 17, 1933

Passengers
- FY2018: 531 daily

Services
Preceding station	JR East	Following station
Uzen-Chitose towards Yamagata	Senzan Line Rapid A C	Sakunami towards Sendai
Takase towards Yamagata	Senzan Line Rapid B	Sakunami towards Sendai
Takase towards Yamagata	Senzan Line Local	Omoshiroyama-Kōgen towards Sendai
Location
- Location within Yamagata Prefecture Location within Japan

Yamadera Station (山寺駅, Yamadera-eki) is a railway station in the city of Yamagata, Yamagata Prefecture, Japan, operated by East Japan Railway Company (JR East).

== Lines ==
Yamadera Station is served by the Senzan Line, and is located 48.7 rail kilometers from the terminus of the line at Sendai Station.

== Station layout ==
The station has a single island platform connected to the station building by a footbridge. The station building is designed to resemble a Buddhist temple. The station has a Midori no Madoguchi staffed ticket office, and features a decent number of coin lockers for those looking to visit the temple up the mountain nearby.

=== Platforms ===
1	■ Senzan Line	for Sakunami, Ayashi and Sendai
2	■ Senzan Line	for Uzen-Chitose and Yamagata

== History ==
Yamadera Station opened on October 17, 1933. The station was absorbed into the JR East network upon the privatization of JNR on April 1, 1987.

== Passenger statistics ==
In fiscal 2018, the station was used by an average of 531 passengers daily (boarding passengers only).

== Surrounding area ==
- Yama-dera
- Yamadera Basho Memorial Museum

== See also ==
- List of railway stations in Japan
