= Sakunami Station =

Railway station in Sendai, Japan

Sakunami Station 作並駅
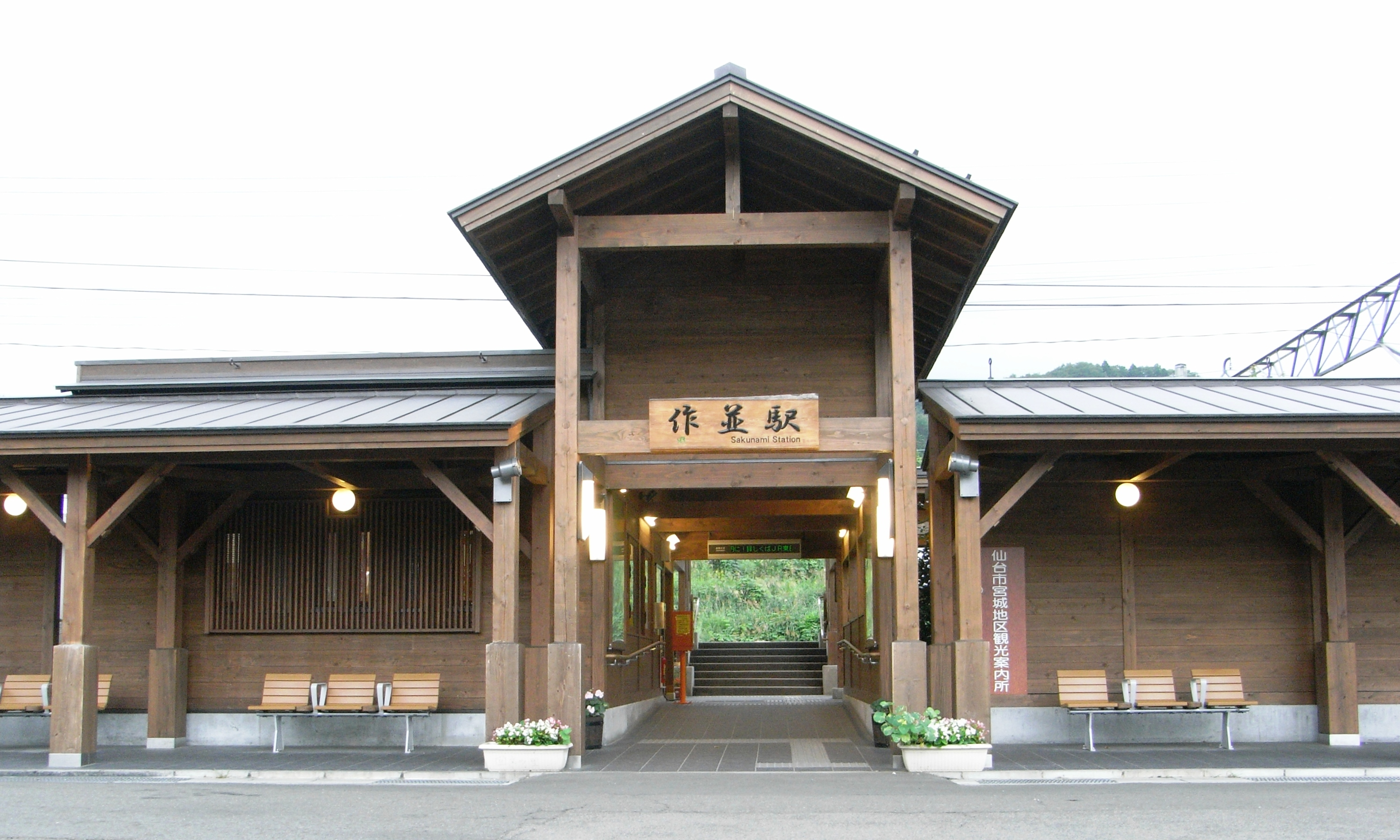
- Sakunami Station, October 2009

General information
- Location: Sakunami-aze Ainosawa 27-2, Aoba-ku, Sendai-shi, Miyagi-ken 989-3431; Japan
- Coordinates: 38°19′4″N 140°37′58″E
- Operator: JR East
- Line: ■ Senseki Line
- Distance: 28.7 km from Sendai
- Platforms: 1 side +1 island platforms
- Tracks: 3

Other information
- Status: Staffed
- Website: Official website

History
- Opened: 30 August 1931

Passengers
- FY2018: 186 daily

Services
Preceding station	JR East	Following station
Yamadera towards Yamagata	Senzan Line Rapid A B C	Ayashi towards Sendai
Oku-Nikkawa towards Yamagata	Senzan Line Local	Kumagane towards Sendai
Location
- Location within Miyagi Prefecture Location within Japan

Sakunami Station (作並駅, Sakunami-eki) is a railway station in Aoba-ku, Sendai, Miyagi Prefecture, Japan, operated by East Japan Railway Company (JR East).

== Lines ==
Sakunami Station is served by the Senzan Line, and is located 28.7 rail kilometers from the terminus of the line at Sendai.

== Station layout ==
Sakunami Station has one side platform and one island platform, connected to the station building by a level crossing. The station is staffed.

== Platforms ==
1	■ Senzan Line	for Yamadera, Yamagata
2, 3	■ Senzan Line	for Ayashi, Kita-Yamagata and Sendai

== History ==
Sakunami Station opened on 30 August 1931. The station was absorbed into the JR East network upon the privatization of JNR on 1 April 1987. A new station building was completed in March 2008.

== Passenger statistics ==
In fiscal 2018, the station was used by an average of 186 passengers daily (boarding passengers only).

== Surrounding area ==
- Sakunami Onsen
