= List of Sendai Subway stations =

Metro stations in Sendai, Japan

Sendai Subway network map

There are currently 29 stations on the Sendai Subway network operated by the Sendai City Transportation Bureau. The first section to open was the Namboku Line, which began operation in July 1987 between Yaotome Station and Tomizawa Station. As of 2025, the network extends 28.7 km (17.8 mi) and consists of two lines; the Namboku Line and the Tozai Line crossing in central Sendai at Sendai Station.

== Stations ==
=== Namboku Line ===
| No. | Station | Japanese | Photo | Transfers | Location |
|---|---|---|---|---|---|
| N17 | Tomizawa | 富沢 | | | Taihaku-ku |
| N16 | Nagamachi-Minami | 長町南 | | | Taihaku-ku |
| N15 | Nagamachi | 長町 | | ■ Tōhoku Main Line; ■ Jōban Line; Sendai Airport Line | Taihaku-ku |
| N14 | Nagamachi-Itchōme | 長町一丁目 | | | Taihaku-ku |
| N13 | Kawaramachi | 河原町 | | | Wakabayashi-ku |
| N12 | Atagobashi | 愛宕橋 | | | Wakabayashi-ku |
| N11 | Itsutsubashi | 五橋 | | | Aoba-ku |
| N10 | Sendai | 仙台 | | JR East: Tōzai Line (T07); Tōhoku Shinkansen; Akita Shinkansen; ■ Tōhoku Main Line; ■ Senzan Line; ■ Jōban Line; ■ Senseki Line; Sendai Airport Line | Aoba-ku |
| N09 | Hirose-dōri | 広瀬通 | | | Aoba-ku |
| N08 | Kōtōdai-Kōen | 勾当台公園 | | | Aoba-ku |
| N07 | Kita-Yobanchō | 北四番丁 | | | Aoba-ku |
| N06 | Kita-Sendai | 北仙台 | | ■ Senzan Line | Aoba-ku |
| N05 | Dainohara | 台原 | | | Aoba-ku |
| N04 | Asahigaoka | 旭ヶ丘 | | | Aoba-ku |
| N03 | Kuromatsu | 黒松 | | | Izumi-ku |
| N02 | Yaotome | 八乙女 | | | Izumi-ku |
| N01 | Izumi-Chūō | 泉中央 | | | Izumi-ku |

=== Tōzai Line ===
| No. | Station name | Japanese | Photo | Transfers | Location |
|---|---|---|---|---|---|
| T01 | Yagiyama Zoological Park | 八木山動物公園 | | | Taihaku-ku |
| T02 | Aobayama | 青葉山 | | | Aoba-ku |
| T03 | Kawauchi | 川内 | | | Aoba-ku |
| T04 | International Center | 国際センター | | | Aoba-ku |
| T05 | Omachi Nishi-koen | 大町西公園 | | | Aoba-ku |
| T06 | Aoba-dori Ichibancho | 青葉通一番町 | | | Aoba-ku |
| T07 | Sendai | 仙台 | | Namboku Line (N10); Tohoku Shinkansen; Akita Shinkansen; ■ Tohoku Main Line; ■ Senzan Line; ■ Joban Line; ■ Senseki Line; Sendai Airport Line | Aoba-ku |
| T08 | Miyagino-dori | 宮城野通 | | | Miyagino-ku |
| T09 | Rembo | 連坊 | | | Wakabayashi-ku |
| T10 | Yakushido | 薬師堂 | | | Wakabayashi-ku |
| T11 | Oroshimachi | 卸町 | | | Wakabayashi-ku |
| T12 | Rokuchonome | 六丁の目 | | | Wakabayashi-ku |
| T13 | Arai | 荒井 | | | Wakabayashi-ku |
