= Nagamachi Station =

Railway and metro station in Sendai, Japan

N15 Nagamachi Station 長町駅
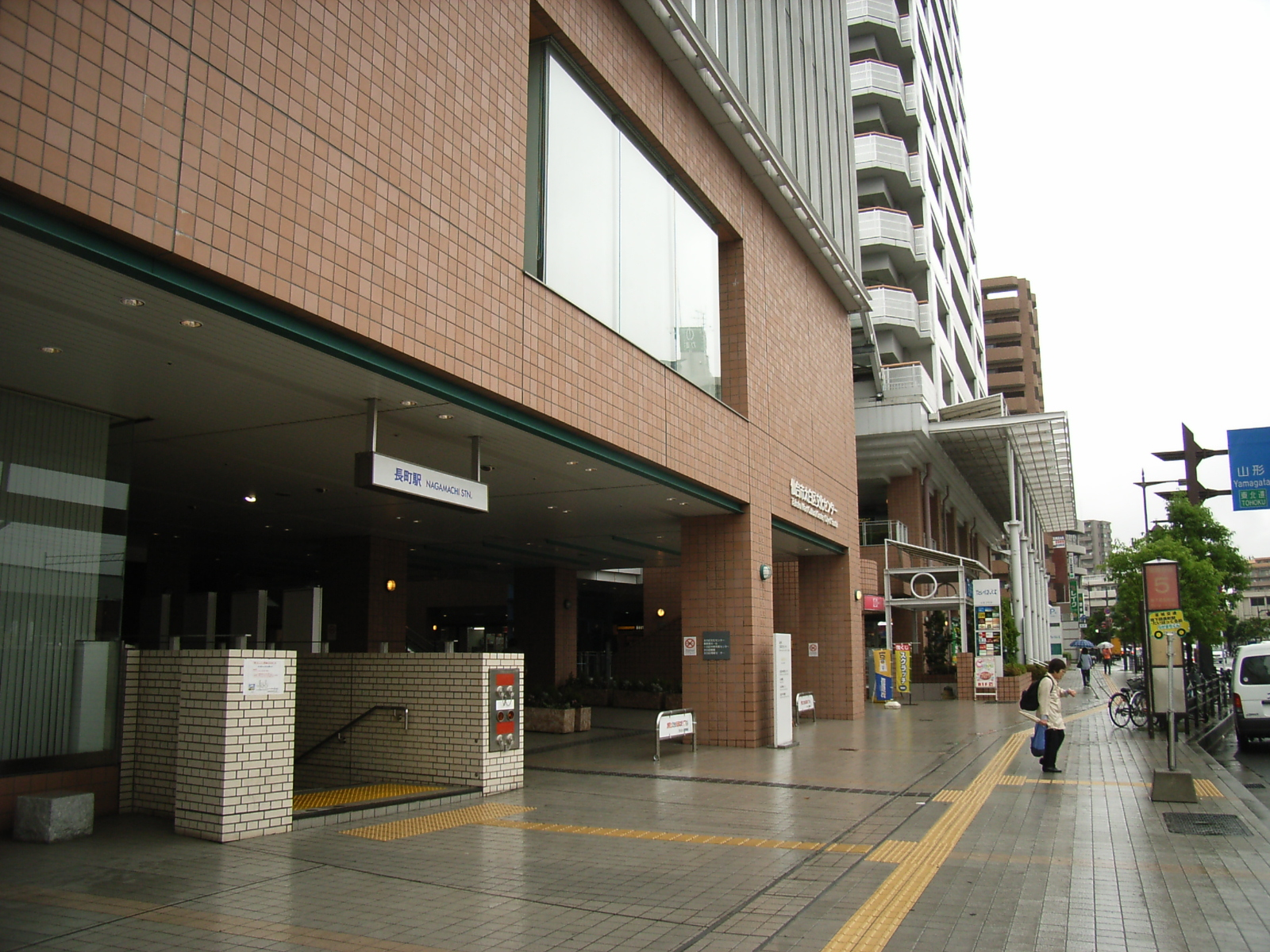
- Entrance to Sendai Subway Nagamachi Station, July 2005

General information
- Location: 5 Nagamachi, Taihaku-ku, Sendai-shi, Miyagi-ken; Japan
- Coordinates: 38°13′35″N 140°53′8″E
- Operator: JR East; Sendai Airport Transit; Sendai Subway
- Line: Tōhoku Main Line
- Platforms: 2 island platforms
- Tracks: 4

Other information
- Status: Staffed ("Midori no Madoguchi")
- Station code: N15 (Namboku Line)

History
- Opened: 2 November 1894; 131 years ago

Passengers
- FY2018 (Daily): 9,513 (JR East); 8,477 (Sendai Subway)

Services
Preceding station	JR East	Following station
Minami-Sendai towards Fukushima	Tōhoku Main Line Rapid City Rabbit	Sendai Terminus
Taishidō towards Kuroiso	Tōhoku Main Line Local	Sendai towards Morioka
Taishidō towards Shinagawa	Jōban Line Local-Futsuu	Sendai Terminus
Preceding station	Sendai Subway	Following station
Nagamachi-Minami N16 towards Tomizawa	Namboku Line	Nagamachi-Itchōme N14 towards Izumi-Chūō
Preceding station	Sendai Airport Transit	Following station
Taishidō towards Sendai Airport	Sendai Airport Line	Sendai Terminus
Location
- Location within Miyagi Prefecture Location within Japan

Nagamachi Station (長町駅, Nagamachi-eki) is a junction railway station in Taihaku-ku, Sendai, Miyagi Prefecture, Japan, operated by East Japan Railway Company (JR East) and the Sendai Subway.

== Lines ==
Nagamachi Station is served by the Sendai Subway Namboku Line, and on JR East's Joban Line and Tohoku Main Line. The Sendai Airport Access Line uses the same tracks, but passes through the station without stopping. The subway and JR lines are not directly connected; however, the distance between the two stations is only around two hundred metres. It is 347.3 kilometers from the terminus of the Tohoku Main Line at Tokyo and 12.4 kilometers from the terminus of the Sendai Subway Namboku Line at Izumi-Chūō.

== Station layout ==
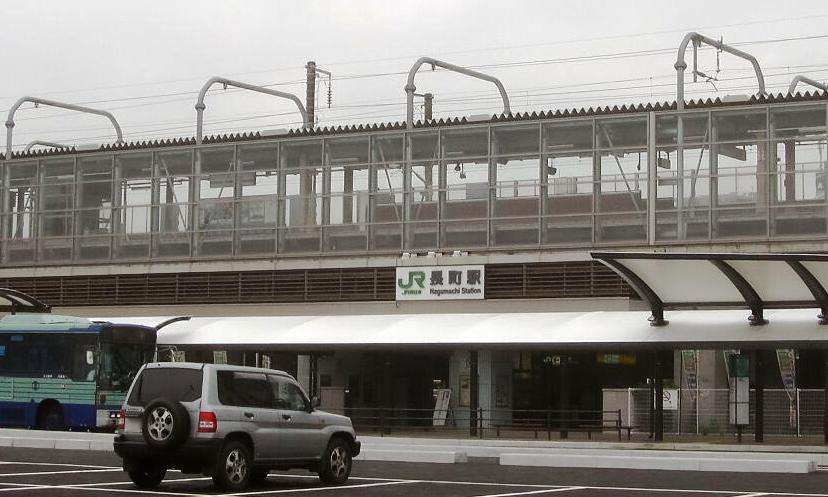
Nagamachi station

JR Nagamachi Station is an elevated station with one island platform, and the station building located underneath. The station has a "Midori no Madoguchi" staffed ticket office. The Sendai Subway portion of the station has a single underground island platform.

=== JR East platforms ===
1	■ Tohoku Main Line	for Sendai, Rifu, Matsushima, and Kogota
2	■ Tohoku Main Line	for Shiroishi and Fukushima
2	■ Joban Line	for Iwanuma and Haranomachi

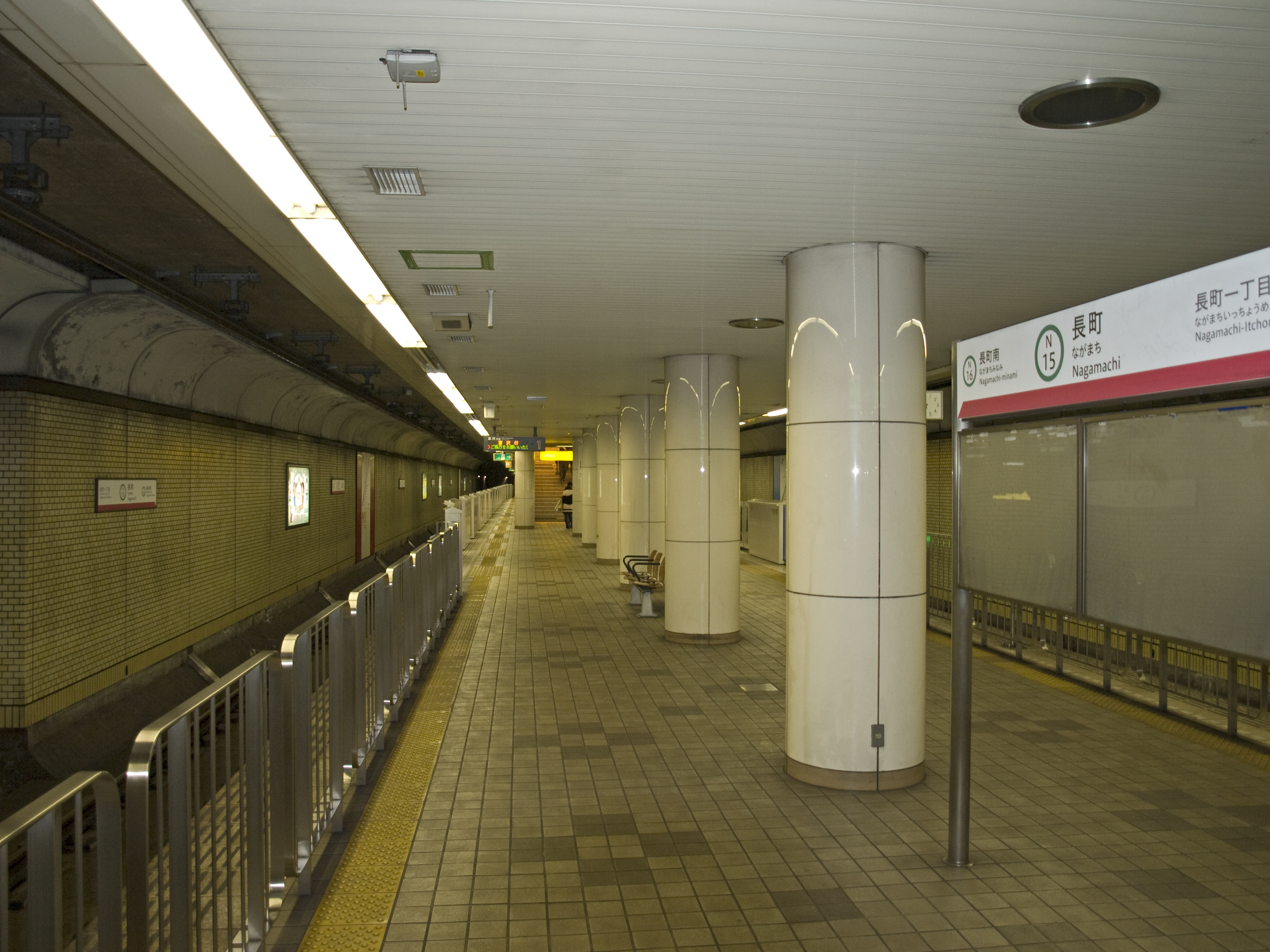
The Sendai Subway platforms in October 2015

=== Sendai Subway platforms ===
1	■ Namboku Line	■ for Tomizawa
2	■ Namboku Line	■ for Sendai and Izumi-Chūō

== History ==
Nagamachi Station opened on November 2, 1894, as a military station of the Nippon Railway. It was opened to the general public on February 21, 1896. The station was absorbed into the JR East network upon the privatization of the Japanese National Railways (JNR) on April 1, 1987. The subway station opened on June 15, 1987.

== Passenger statistics ==
In fiscal 2018, the JR East station was used by an average of 9,513 passengers daily (boarding passengers only). In the same year, the Sendai Subway station was used by an average of 8,477 passengers daily.

== Surrounding area ==
- National Route 4
- National Route 286
- Sendai-Taihaku Ward Office
- Sendai-Nitta Post Office
