= Nagamachi-Itchōme Station =

Metro station in Sendai, Japan

N14 Nagamachi-Itchōme Station 長町一丁目駅
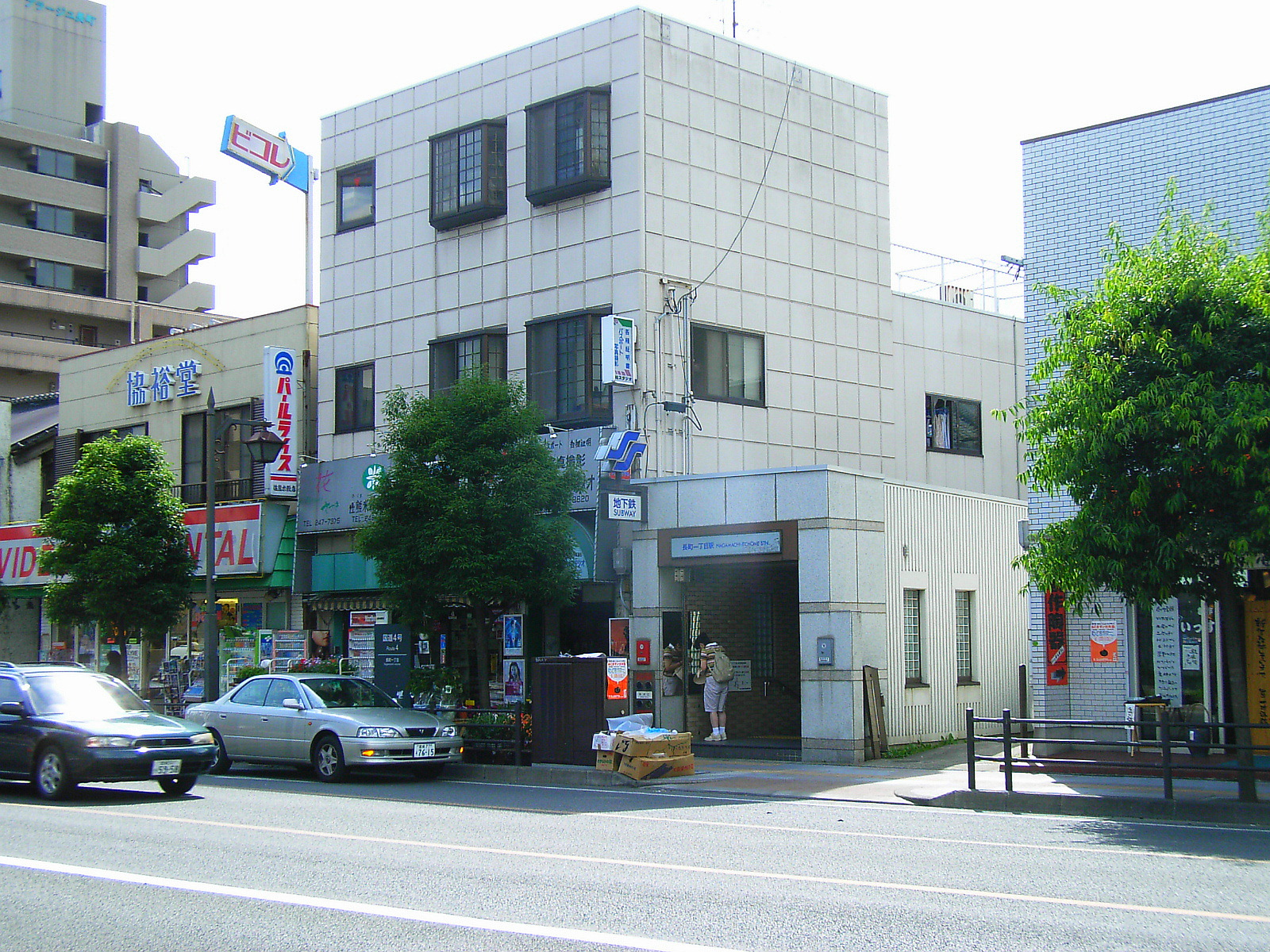
- Nagamachi-Itchōme Subway Station in July 2005

General information
- Location: 1-2-12 Nagamachi, Taihaku-ku, Sendai-shi, Miyagi-ken 982-0011; Japan
- Coordinates: 38°14′03″N 140°53′15″E
- System: Sendai Subway station
- Operator: Sendai City Transportation Bureau
- Line: Namboku Line
- Platforms: 1 island platform
- Tracks: 2
- Connections: Bus stop

Other information
- Status: Staffed
- Station code: N14
- Website: Official website

History
- Opened: 15 July 1987; 39 years ago

Passengers
- FY2015 (Daily): 3,608

Services
Preceding station	Sendai Subway	Following station
Nagamachi N15 towards Tomizawa	Namboku Line	Kawaramachi N13 towards Izumi-Chūō
Location
- Location within Miyagi Prefecture Location within Japan

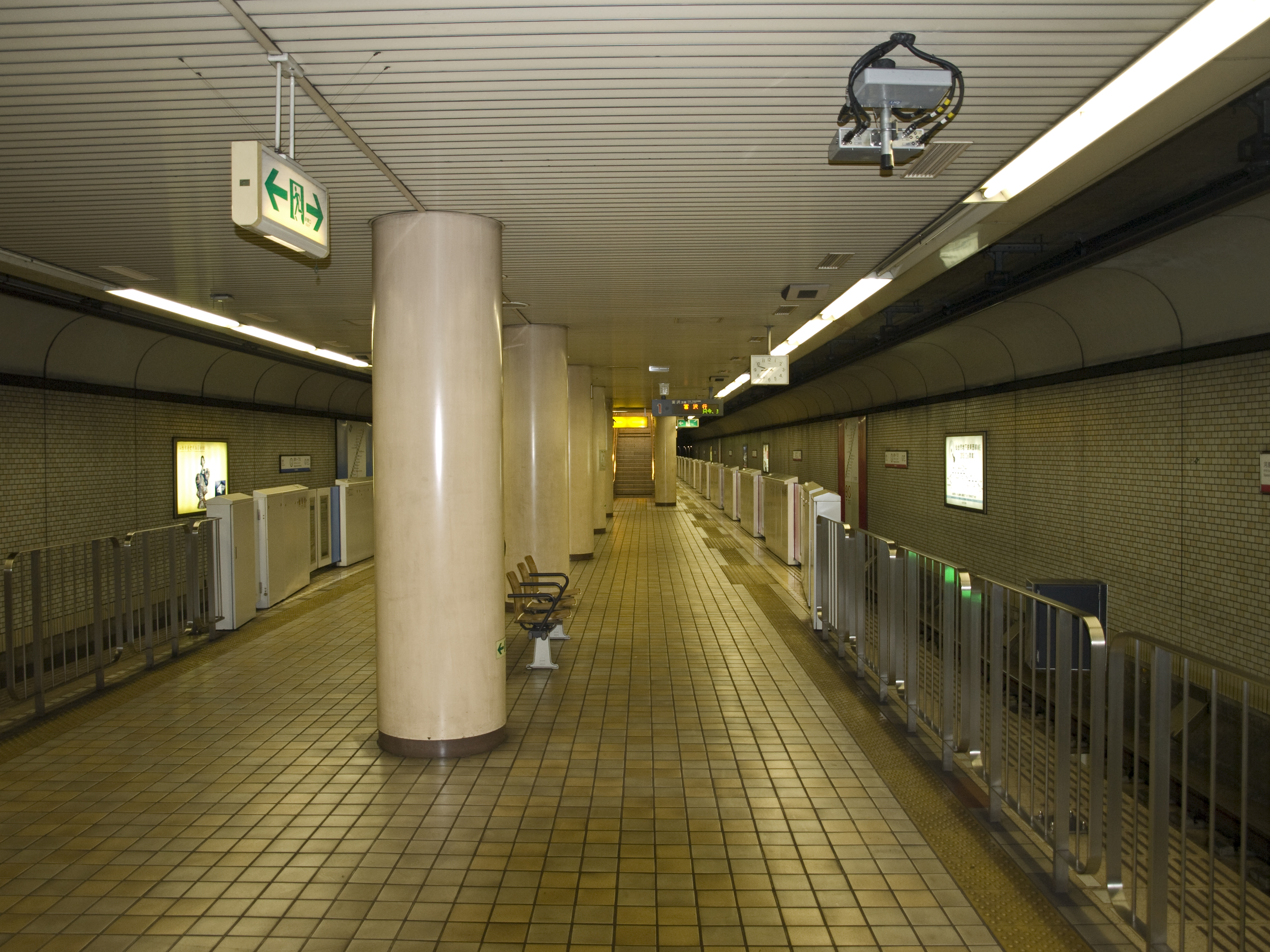
The platforms

Nagamachi-Itchōme Station (長町一丁目駅, Nagamachi-Itchōme eki) is an underground metro station on the Sendai Subway Namboku Line in Taihaku-ku, Sendai, Miyagi Prefecture, Japan.

== Lines ==
Nagamachi-Itchōme Station is on the Sendai Subway Namboku Line and is located 11.7 rail kilometers from the terminus of the line at Izumi-Chūō.

== Station layout ==
Nagamachi-Itchōme Station is an underground station with a single island platform serving two tracks.

=== Platforms ===
1	■ Namboku Line	■ for Tomizawa
2	■ Namboku Line	■ for Sendai, Izumi-Chūō

== History ==
Nagamachi-Itchōme Station opened on 15 July 1987.

== Passenger statistics ==
In fiscal 2015, the station was used by an average of 3,608 passengers daily.

== Surrounding area ==
- Sendai- Nagamachi Post Office
