= Nagamachi-Minami Station =

Metro station in Sendai, Japan

N16 Nagamachi-Minami Station 長町南駅
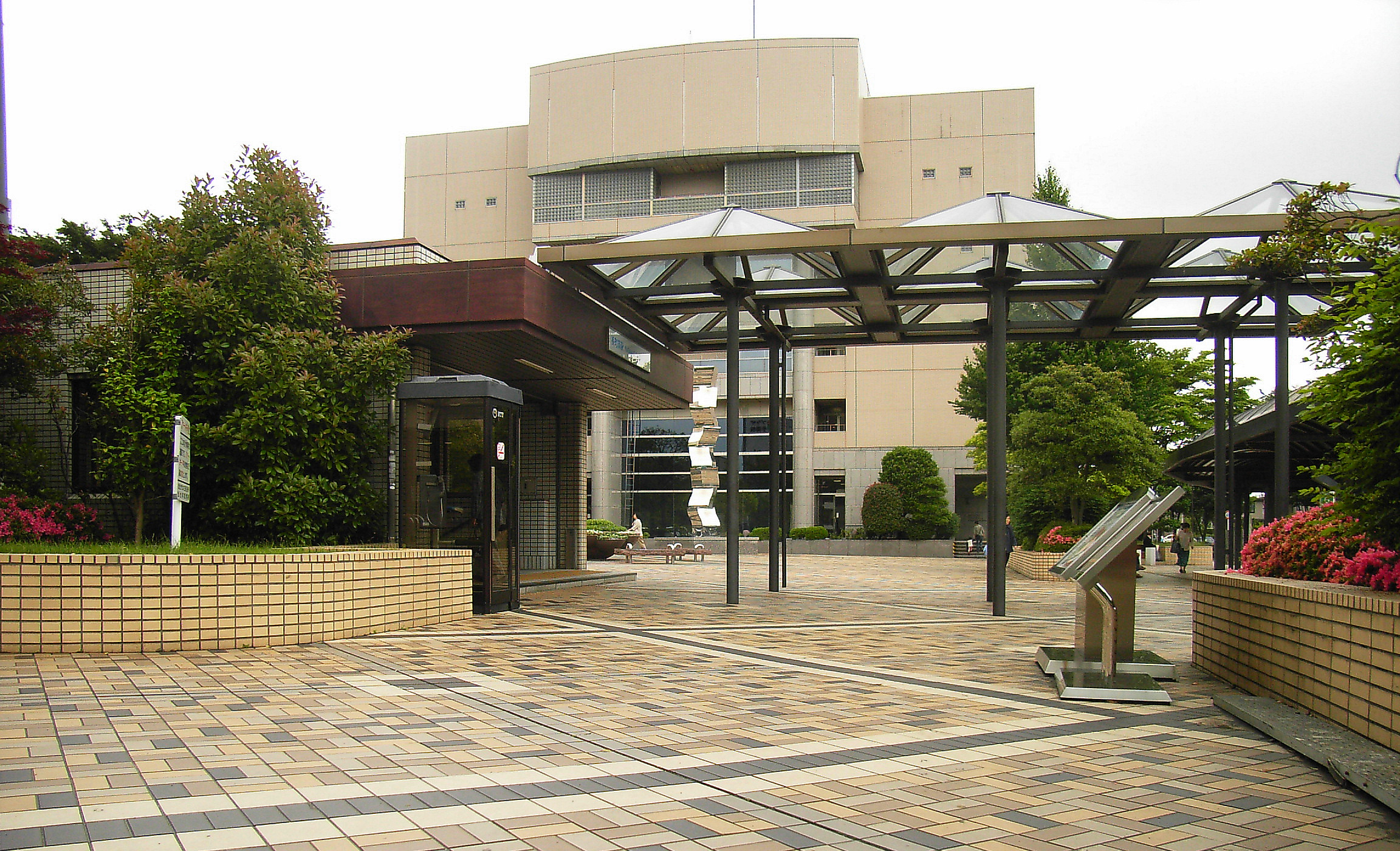
- Nagamachi-Minami Station in June 2005

General information
- Location: 3-1 Nagamachiminami, Taihaku-ku, Sendai-shi, Miyagi-ken 982-0012; Japan
- Coordinates: 38°13′29″N 140°52′36″E
- System: Sendai Subway station
- Operator: Sendai Subway
- Line: ■Namboku Line
- Connections: Bus stop

Other information
- Status: Staffed
- Station code: N16
- Website: Official website

History
- Opened: 15 July 1987; 39 years ago

Passengers
- FY2015 (Daily): 11,762

Services
Preceding station	Sendai Subway	Following station
Tomizawa N17 Terminus	Namboku Line	Nagamachi N15 towards Izumi-Chūō
Location
- Location within Miyagi Prefecture Location within Japan

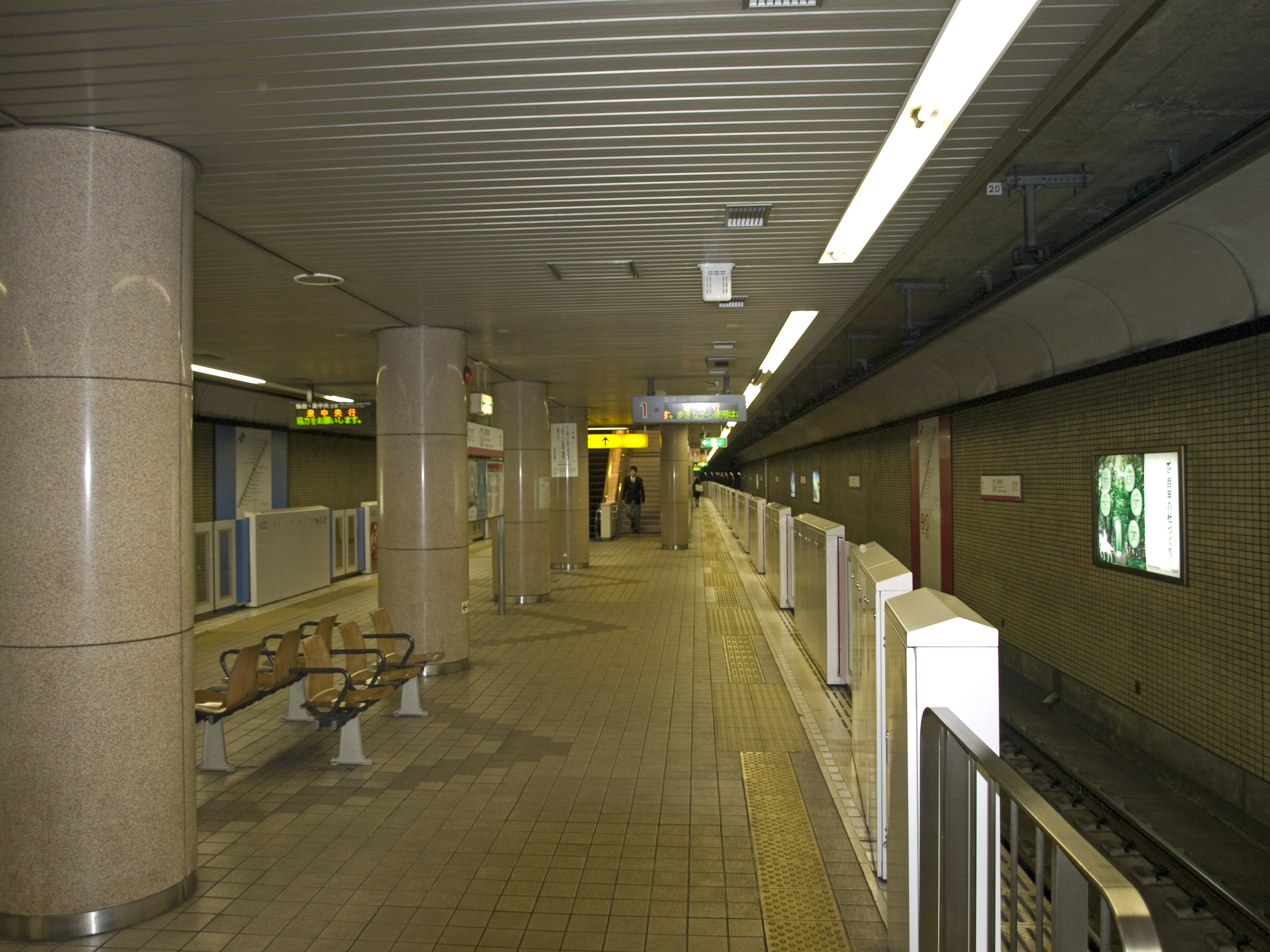
The platforms

Nagamachi-Minami Station (長町南駅, Nagamachi-Minami eki) is an underground metro station on the Sendai Subway Namboku Line in Taihaku-ku, Sendai, Miyagi Prefecture, Japan.

== Lines ==
Nagamachi-Minami Station is on the Sendai Subway Namboku Line and is located 13.3 kilometers from the terminus of the line at Izumi-Chūō.

== Station layout ==
Nagamachi-Minami Station is an underground station with a single island platform serving two tracks.

=== Platforms ===
1	■ Namboku Line	■ for Tomizawa
2	■ Namboku Line	■ for Sendai, Izumi-Chūō

== History ==
Nagamachi-Minami Station opened on July 15, 1987.

== Passenger statistics ==
In fiscal 2015, the station was used by an average of 11,762 passengers daily.

== Surrounding area ==
- Taihaku Ward Office
- Nagamachi-Minami Bus Pool
- The Mall Sendai Nagamachi
- Lala Garden Nagamachi
- Sendai City Tomizawa Site Museum
- Sendai City Southern Developmental Disorder Consultation Support Center (Nambu Archl)
