= Kawaramachi Station (Miyagi) =

Metro station in Sendai, Japan

N13 Kawaramachi Station 河原町駅
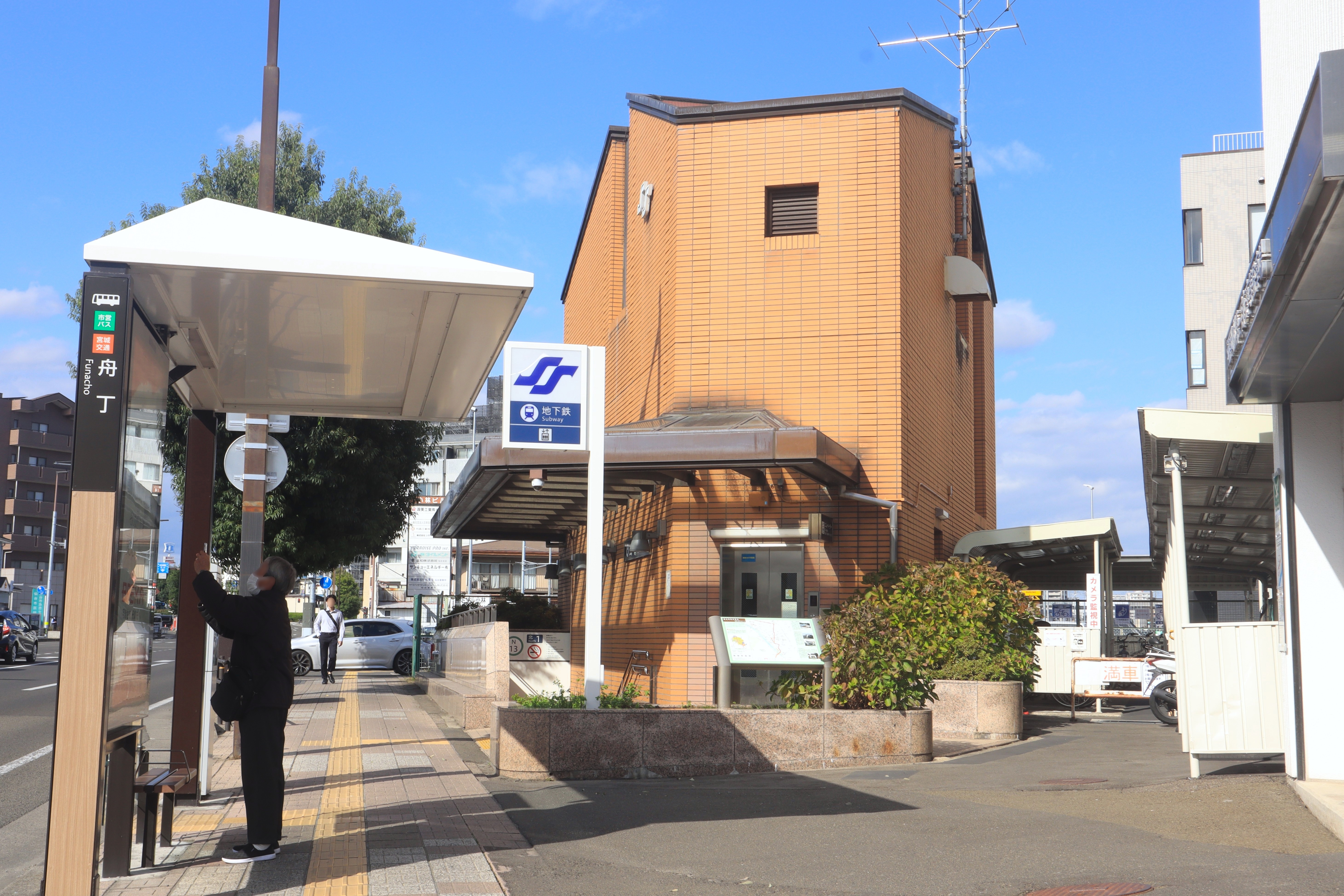
- Kawaramachi Station in October 2025

General information
- Location: Minamizaimokucho, Wakabayashi-ku, Sendaishi, Miyagi-ken 984-0805; Japan
- Coordinates: 38°14′28″N 140°53′16″E
- System: Sendai Subway station
- Operator: Sendai City Transportation Bureau
- Line: Namboku Line
- Distance: 10.9 km (6.8 mi) from Izumi-Chūō
- Platforms: 1 island platform
- Connections: Bus stop

Other information
- Status: Staffed
- Station code: N13
- Website: Official website

History
- Opened: 15 July 1987; 39 years ago

Passengers
- FY2015 (Daily): 5,050

Services
Preceding station	Sendai Subway	Following station
Nagamachi-Itchōme N14 towards Tomizawa	Namboku Line	Atagobashi N12 towards Izumi-Chūō
Location
- Location within Miyagi Prefecture Location within Japan

Kawaramachi Station (河原町駅, Kawaramachi eki) is an underground railway station on the Sendai Subway Namboku Line in Wakabayashi-ku, Sendai, Miyagi Prefecture, Japan.

== Lines ==
Kawaramachi Station is on the Sendai Subway Namboku Line and is located 10.9 km (6.8 mi) from the terminus of the line at Izumi-Chūō.

== Station layout ==
Kawaramachi Station is an underground station with a single island platform serving two tracks.

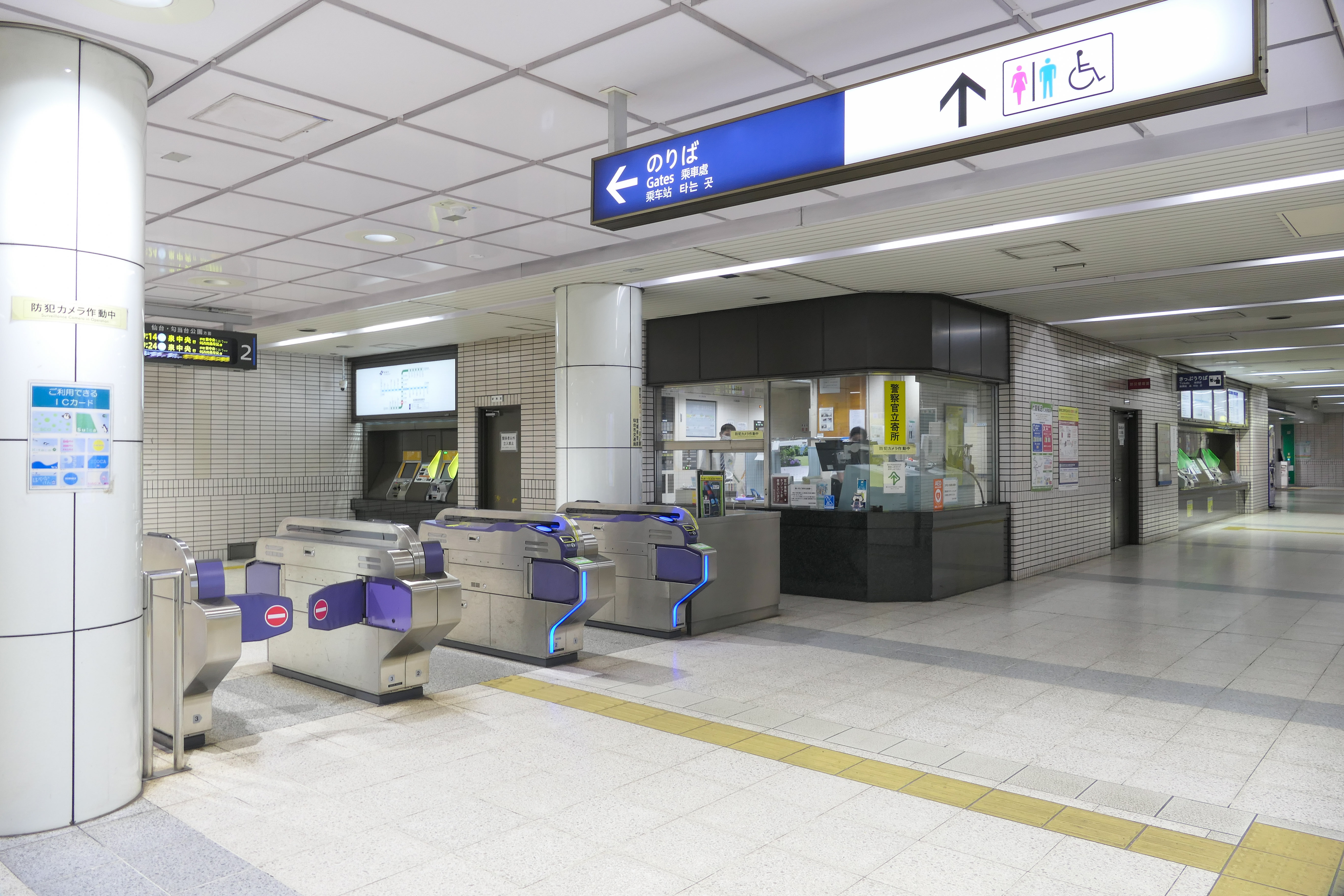
ticket gate

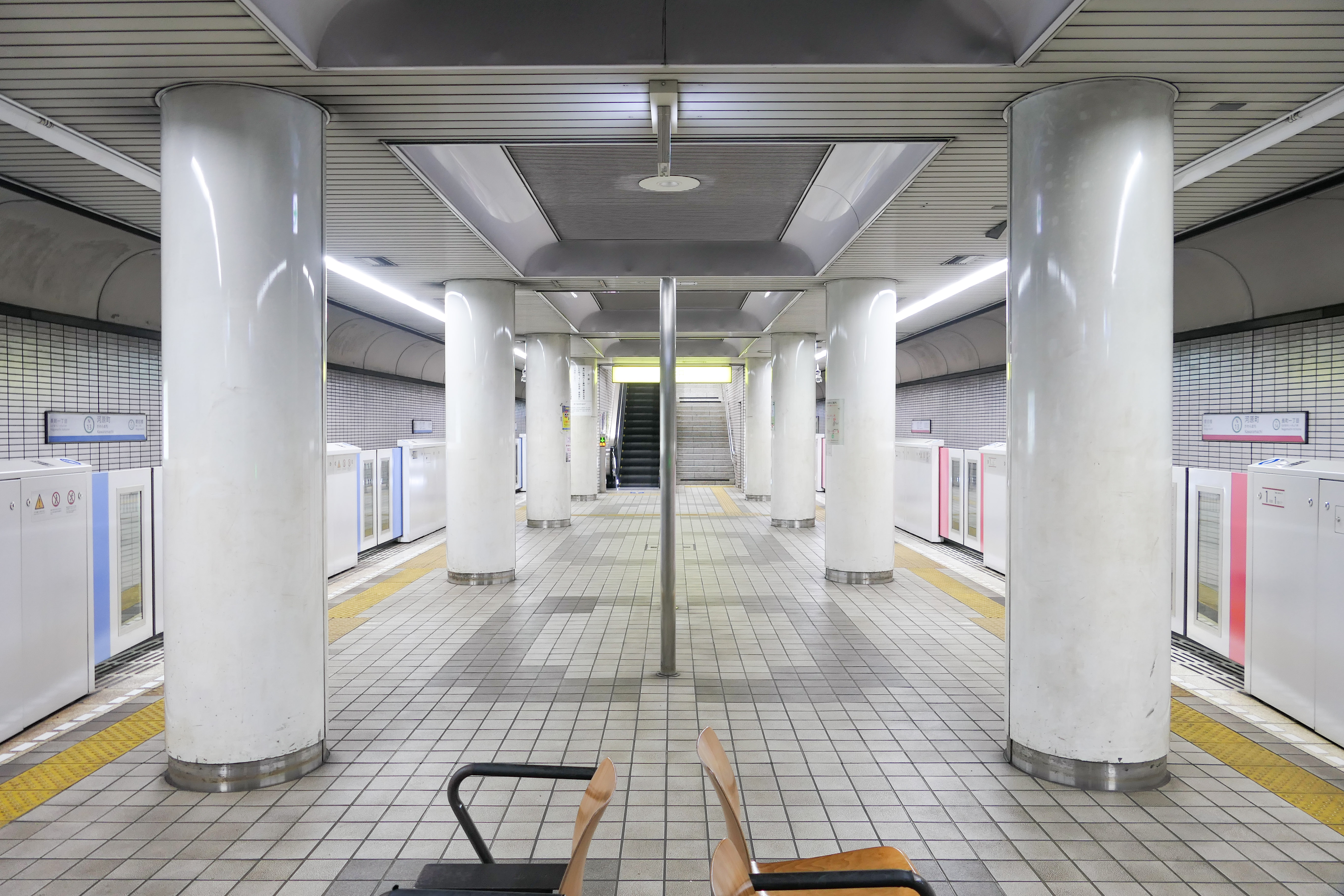
platform

=== Platforms ===
1	■ Namboku Line (Sendai)	■ for Tomizawa
2	■ Namboku Line (Sendai)	■ for Sendai and Izumi-Chūō

== History ==
Kawaramachi Station opened on 15 July 1987.

== Passenger statistics ==
In fiscal 2015, the station was used by an average of 5,050 passengers daily.

== Surrounding area ==
- National Route 4
- Miyazawa Bridge
- Kawaramachi Shopping District

== See also ==
- List of railway stations in Japan
