= Taihaku-ku =

Taihaku 太白区
- Ward
- Taihaku Ward
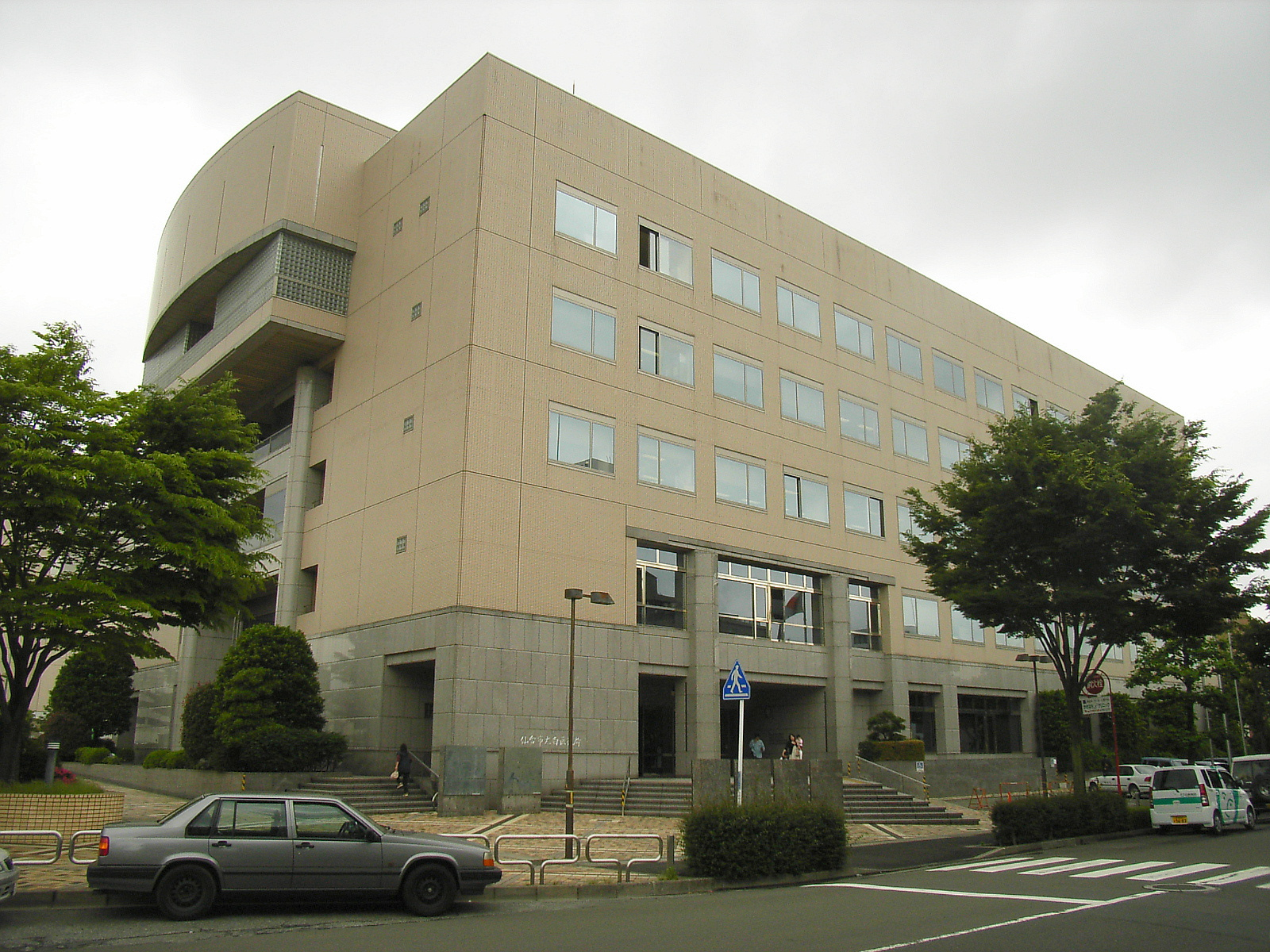
- Taihaku Ward Office

- Flag

- Location of Taihaku-ku in Sendai

- Location within Japan
- Coordinates: 38°13′27.5″N 140°52′37.8″E
- Country: Japan
- Region: Tōhoku
- Prefecture: Miyagi
- City: Sendai

Area
  - Total: 228.39 km^{2} (88.18 sq mi)

Population (April 1, 2017)
  - Total: 226,069
  - Density: 997/km^{2} (2,580/sq mi)
- Time zone: UTC+09:00 (Japan Standard Time)
- Phone number: 022-261-1111
- Address: 3-1-15 Nagamachi-minami, Taihaku-ku, Sendai-shi, Miyagi-ken 982-8601
- Website: Official website (in Japanese)

Taihaku-ku (太白区) is the southernmost ward of the city Sendai, in Miyagi Prefecture, Japan. As of 1 March 2023, the ward had a population of 234,391 and a population density of 1028 persons per km^{2} in 113,068 households. The total area of the ward was 228.39 square kilometres (88.18 sq mi). Taihaku-ku is eleventh largest ward in Japan in terms of area, and second-largest in Sendai (behind Aoba-ku). The western portion of the ward is the former town of Akiu, Miyagi.

== Geography ==
Taihaku-ku is located inland, forming the southern portion of Sendai metropolis. The area is mountainous to the west, and the Natori River flows through the ward.

=== Neighboring municipalities ===
- Miyagi Prefecture
  - Aoba-ku, Sendai
  - Wakabayashi-ku, Sendai
  - Natori
  - Murata
  - Kawasaki
- Yamagata Prefecture
  - Yamagata
  - Higashine

== History ==
The area of present-day Taihaku-ku was part of ancient Mutsu Province, and has been settled since at least the Japanese Paleolithic period. The area was inhabited by the Emishi people, and came under the control of the imperial dynasty during the late Nara period. During the Heian period, it was controlled by the Abe clan, followed by the Northern Fujiwara clan of Hiraizumi. During the Sengoku period, the area was dominated by various samurai clans before coming under the control of the Date clan during the Edo period, who ruled Sendai Domain under the Tokugawa shogunate. With the establishment of the post-Meiji restoration municipalities system, the area was organised into Natori District of Miyagi Prefecture. The expanding city of Sendai annexed the town of Nagamachi in 1928, villages of Nishitaga in 1932, Tanaka in 1941, Oide in 1956 and town of Akiu in 1988. On April 1, 1989, when Sendai became a designated city by the national government with increased local autonomy, Taihaku-ku was formed as one of the five wards of the city.

== Transportation ==
=== Railway ===
- East Japan Railway Company (JR East) - Tōhoku Main Line / Jōban Line
  - Minami-Sendai - Taishidō - Nagamachi
- Sendai Subway - Namboku Line
  - Nagamachi-Itchome – Nagamachi – Nagamachi-Minami – Tomizawa
- Sendai Subway - Tōzai Line
  - Yagiyama Zoological Park

=== Highway ===
- Tōhoku Expressway – (Sendai-Minami Interchange)
- Sendai-Nanbu Road – (Yamada and Nagamachi interchanges)
- National Route 4
- National Route 286
- National Route 457

== Education ==
=== Colleges and universities ===
- Tohoku University - Taihaku campus (Graduate School of Science)
- Miyagi University - Taihaku campus
- Tohoku Institute of Technology

=== Primary and secondary schools ===
Taihaku-ku has 28 public elementary schools and 14 public junior high schools operated by the city government. The ward has four public high schools operated by the Miyagi Prefectural Board of Education. Miyagi Prefecture also operates two special education schools within the ward. In addition, Taihaku-ku is host to the Tohoku Korean Primary and Junior High School, a North Korean international school.

== Local attractions ==
- Akiu Great Falls
- Sendai City Tomizawa Site Museum
- Sendai Yagiyama Zoological Park
- Sendai City Wild Plants Garden
