= Tohoku Korean Primary and Junior High School =

North Korea-affiliated school in Japan

- 東北朝鮮初中級学校 도호꾸조선초중급학교

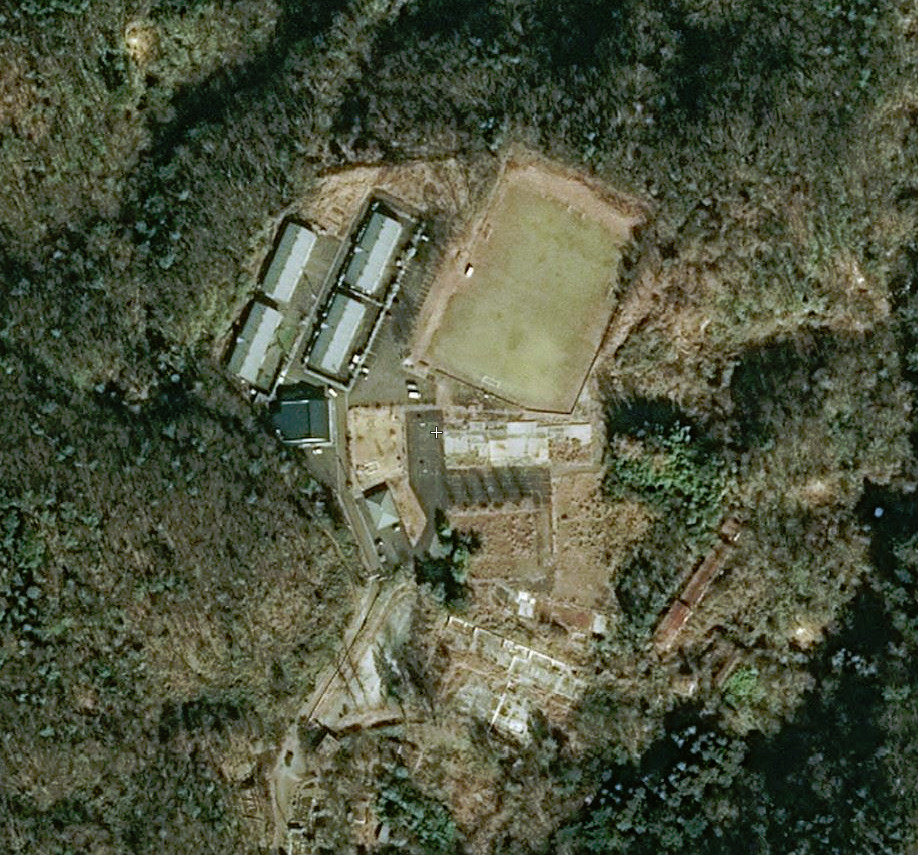
- Aerial view of the school

Location
- 19-558 Nagamachi Koshiji, Taihaku-ku; Sendai, Miyagi Prefecture, 982-0837; Japan; 38°14′40″N 140°50′14″E

Information
- Type: Private Korean international school
- Established: 1965; 61 years ago
- School board: Miyagi Korean Educational Foundation
- Grades: Primary and junior high school
- Enrollment: 14 (2025)
- Website: www.tcs.ed.jp

Tohoku Korean Primary and Junior High School (東北朝鮮初中級学校, Tōhoku Chōsen Shochūkyūgakko; Korean: 도호꾸 조선 초중급학교) is a North Korean international school in Taihaku-ku, Sendai, Miyagi Prefecture. As of 2025 Yoon Tae Gil is the principal.

The school formerly had a senior high school division.

== History ==
The school was established on April 25, 1965. Construction of the dormitory was completed on October 4, 1967. On April 1, 1970, the senior high school division opened. The first high school class graduated on March 10, 1971. The senior high school building was expanded by four classrooms on April 5, 1973. The Kindergarten section was established on April 5, 1977. Historically the school used a five story classroom building.

The 2011 Tōhoku earthquake and tsunami destroyed the classroom building, forcing the school to use the cafeteria and dormitories as classrooms. The school began asking for financial assistance from the Japanese government in rebuilding its classroom facilities: Yun requested about 100 million yen to 200 million yen while the Japanese government stated it provided 1.5 million yen (US$18,000) in 2011.
