= Namboku Line (Sendai) =

Metro line in Sendai, Japan

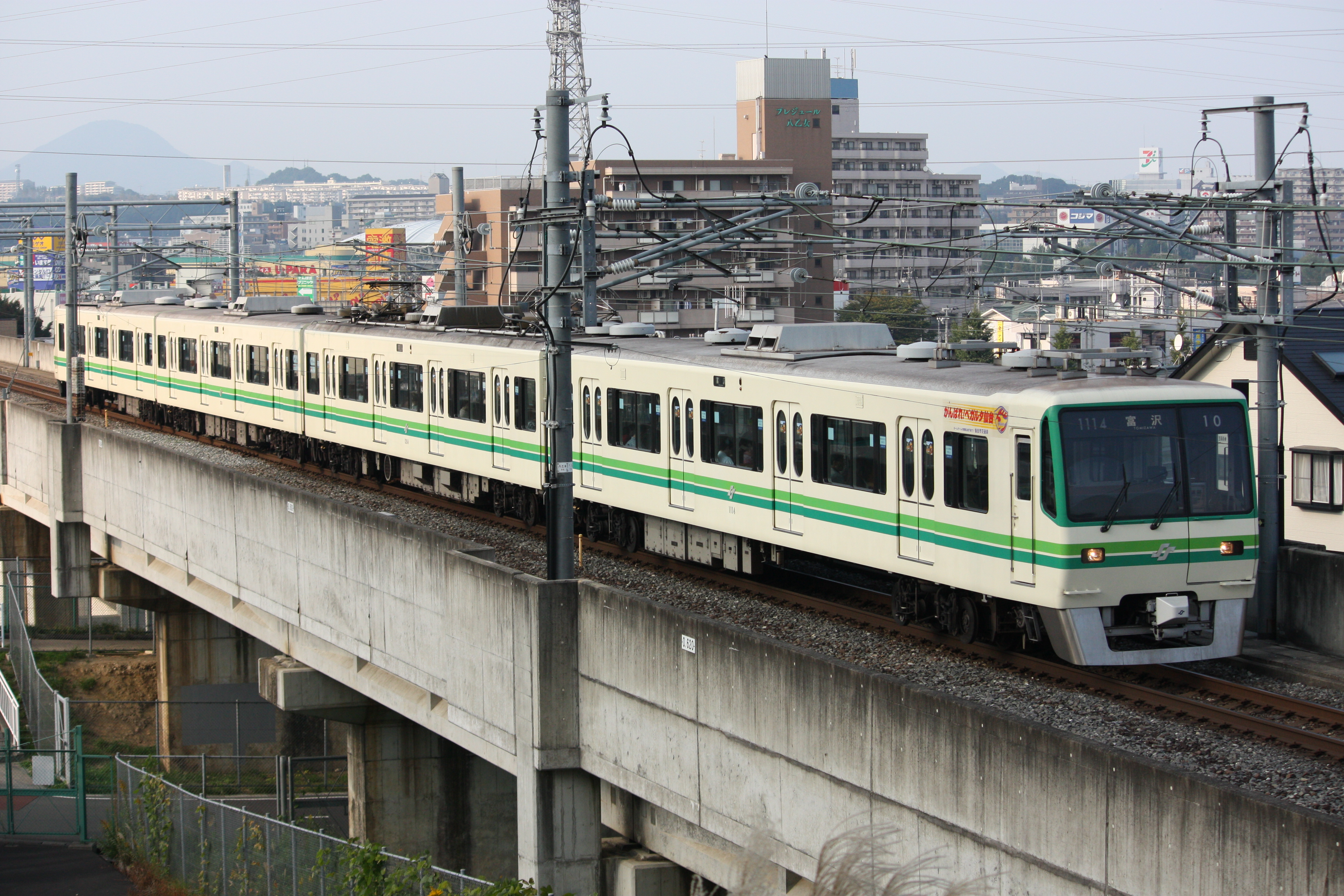

Overview
- Status: In operation
- Owner: Sendai City Transportation Bureau
- Locale: Sendai, Miyagi
- Termini: Tomizawa; Izumi-Chūō
- Stations: 17

Service
- Type: Rapid transit
- Rolling stock: 1000 series 3000 series

History
- Opened: July 15, 1987; 39 years ago
- Last extension: 1992

Technical
- Line length: 14.8 km (9.2 mi)
- Num of tracks: 2
- Track gauge: 1,067 mm (3 ft 6 in)
- Electrification: 1,500 V DC from overhead catenary
- Operating speed: 75 km/h (45 mph)

The Namboku Line (南北線, Nanboku-sen) is a rapid transit line of Sendai Subway in Sendai, Japan. It connects Izumi-Chūō Station in Izumi-ku, Sendai, with Tomizawa Station in Taihaku-ku, Sendai. The line is 14.8 km (9.2 mi) long and has 17 stations. Like many mainline trains and metros in Japan, it uses the 1067 mm track gauge and runs on 1,500 V overhead line. The name "Namboku" means south–north, which is the general direction that the track runs.

The Namboku Line was the world's first public railway to use fuzzy logic to control its speed. This system (developed by Hitachi) accounts for the relative smoothness of the starts and stops when compared to other trains, and is 10% more energy efficient than human-controlled acceleration.

== Stations ==
All stations are in Sendai.

No.	Station name	Japanese	Distance (km)		Transfers	Location
No.	Station name	Japanese	Between stations	Total	Transfers	Location
N01	Izumi-Chūō	泉中央	-	0.0		Izumi-ku
N02	Yaotome	八乙女	1.2	1.2		Izumi-ku
N03	Kuromatsu	黒松	1.3	2.5		Izumi-ku
N04	Asahigaoka	旭ヶ丘	0.8	3.3		Aoba-ku
N05	Dainohara	台原	1.0	4.3		Aoba-ku
N06	Kita-Sendai	北仙台	1.1	5.4	■ Senzan Line	Aoba-ku
N07	Kita-Yobanchō	北四番丁	1.2	6.6		Aoba-ku
N08	Kōtōdai-Kōen	勾当台公園	0.7	7.3		Aoba-ku
N09	Hirose-dōri	広瀬通	0.6	7.9		Aoba-ku
N10	Sendai	仙台	0.6	8.5	Tōzai Line ( T07 ); Tōhoku Shinkansen; Akita Shinkansen; ■ Tōhoku Main Line; ■ Senzan Line; ■ Jōban Line; ■ Senseki Line; Sendai Airport Line	Aoba-ku
N11	Itsutsubashi	五橋	0.9	9.4		Aoba-ku
N12	Atagobashi	愛宕橋	0.6	10.0		Wakabayashi-ku
N13	Kawaramachi	河原町	0.9	10.9		Wakabayashi-ku
N14	Nagamachi-Itchōme	長町一丁目	0.8	11.7		Taihaku-ku
N15	Nagamachi	長町	0.7	12.4	■ Tōhoku Main Line; ■ Jōban Line; Sendai Airport Line	Taihaku-ku
N16	Nagamachi-Minami	長町南	0.9	13.3		Taihaku-ku
N17	Tomizawa	富沢	1.5	14.8		Taihaku-ku

== History ==
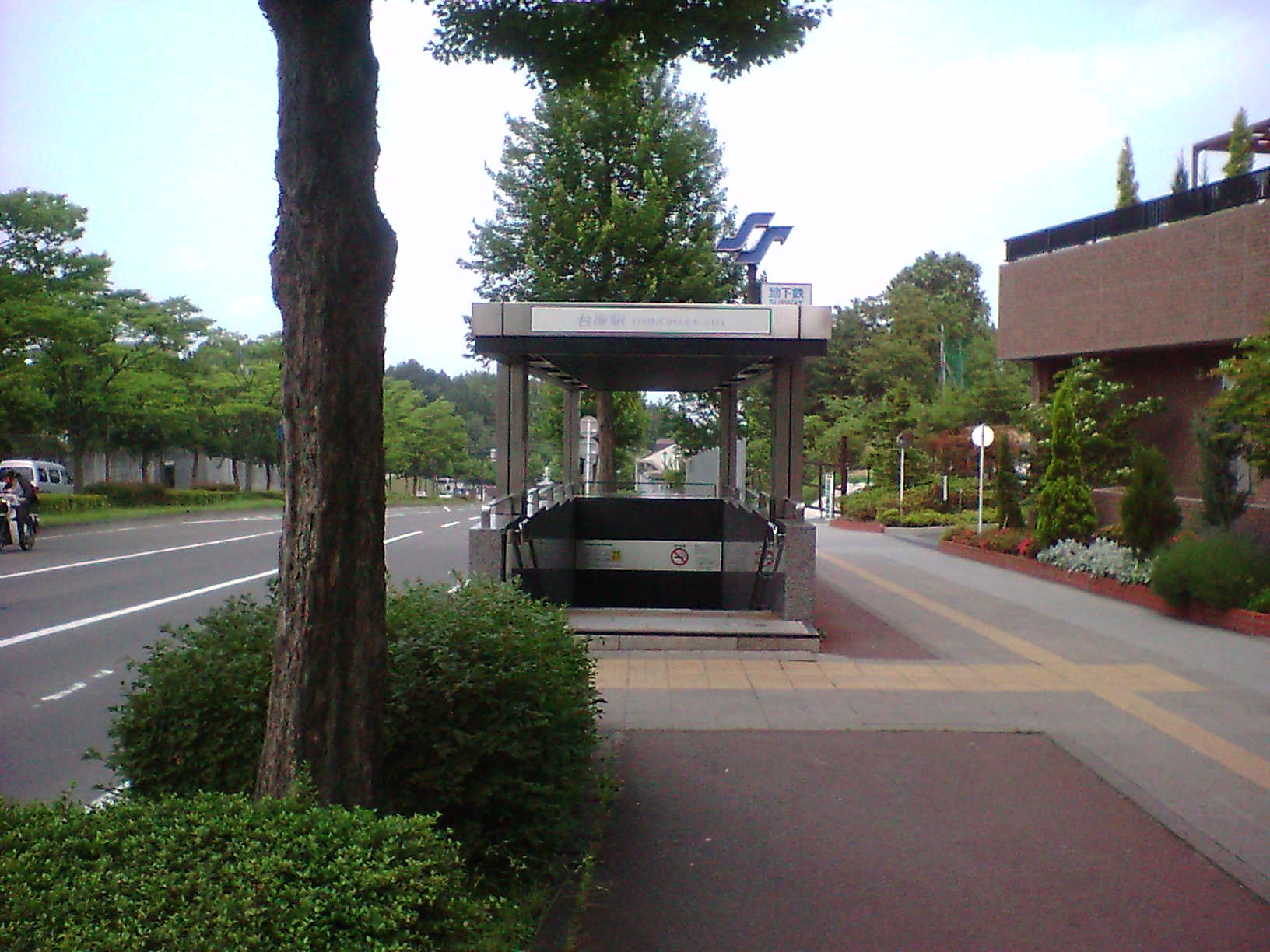
An entrance leading down to Dainohara Station

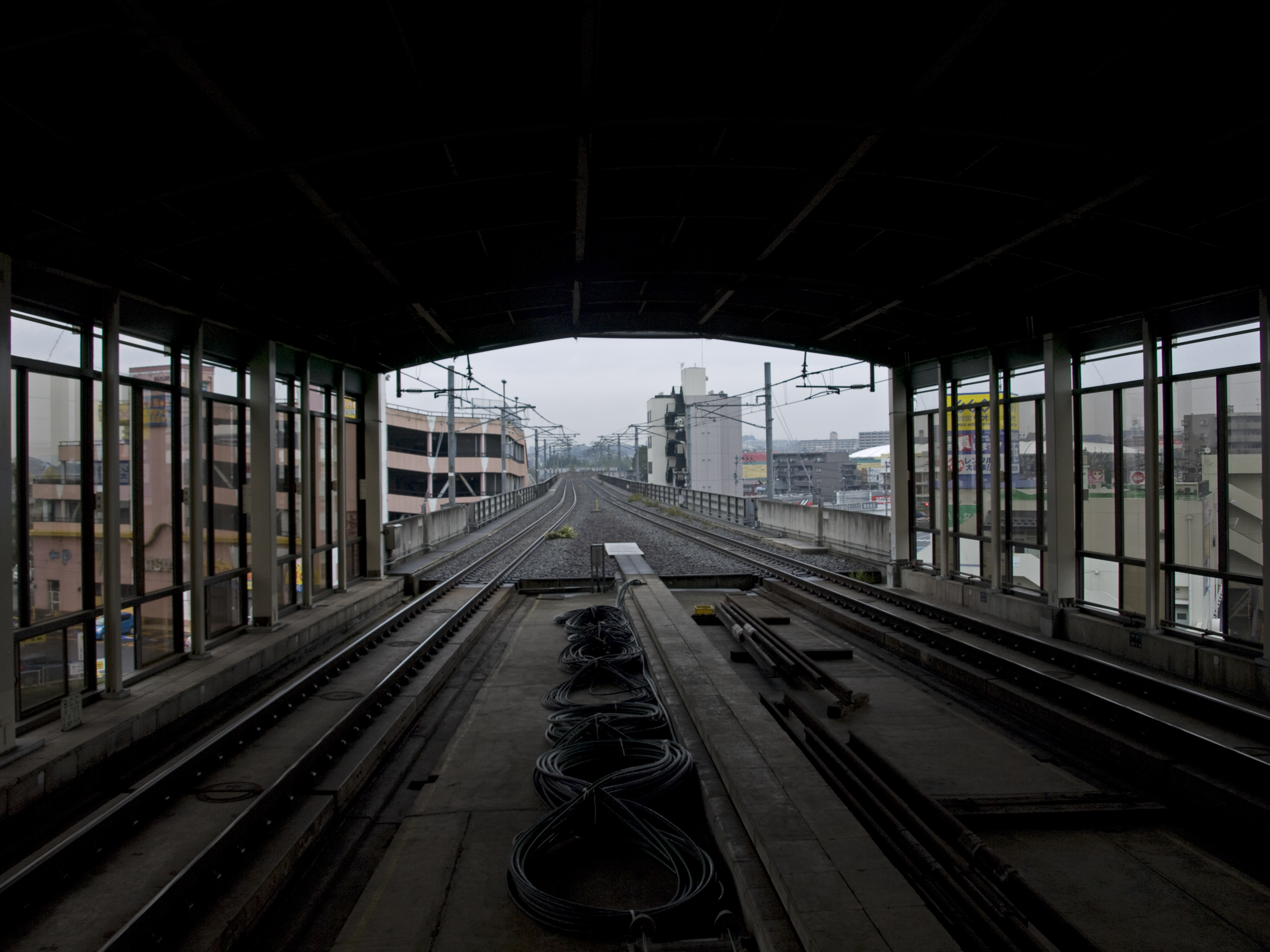
Tracks between Yaotome and Izumi-Chūō stations

- 1981 – Construction started.
- July 15, 1987 – Line opened from Yaotome to Tomizawa.
- July 15, 1992 – Line extended from Yaotome to Izumi-Chūō.
- March 11, 2011 – Damaged in the 2011 Tōhoku earthquake and tsunami and subsequently shut down for repairs.
- April 29, 2011 – Line reopens after repair works were finished.
- 20 February 2024 – Newly delivered 3000 series begins testing.
- 25 October 2024 - 3000 series begins operations.

== Rolling stock ==
- 1000 series 4-car EMUs
- 3000 series 4-car EMUs

== See also ==
- List of rapid transit systems
