= Sendai Subway 3000 series =

Japanese train type

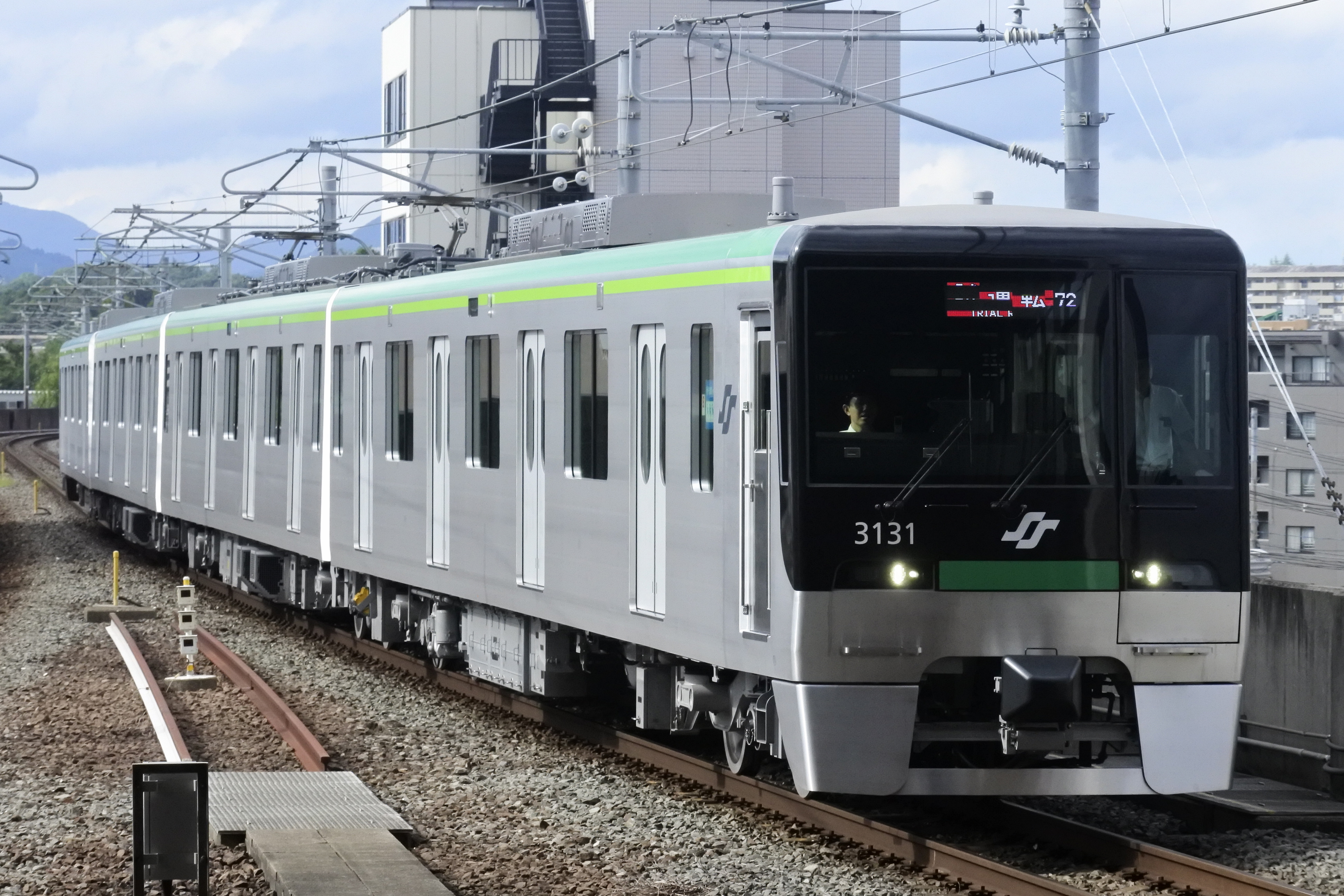
- Set 3131 on the Namboku Line in September 2024
- In service: 2024–present
- Manufacturer: Hitachi
- Replaced: 1000N series
- Constructed: 2023–present
- Entered service: 24 October 2024
- Number under construction: 84 vehicles (21 sets)
- Number built: 4 vehicles (1 set) (as of September 2023)
- Formation: 4 cars per trainset
- Capacity: 145 (45 seated) per car
- Operators: Sendai City Transportation Bureau
- Lines served: Namboku Line

Specifications
- Car body construction: Aluminium alloy
- Car length: 21,750 mm (71 ft 4 in) (end cars); 20,000 mm (65 ft 7 in) (intermediate cars)
- Width: 2,886 mm (9 ft 5.6 in)
- Height: 4,020 mm (13 ft 2 in)
- Doors: 4 pairs per side
- Maximum speed: 75 km/h (47 mph)
- Weight: 136.1 t (134.0 long tons; 150.0 short tons)
- Traction system: Variable frequency (SiC hybrid module)
- Traction motors: 3-phase AC induction motor
- Power output: 160 kW (215 hp) per motor
- Acceleration: 3.5 km/(h⋅s) (2.2 mph/s)
- Deceleration: 3.7 km/(h⋅s) (2.3 mph/s) (service); 4.5 km/(h⋅s) (2.8 mph/s) (emergency)
- Electric system(s): 1,500 V DC (overhead catenary)
- Current collection: Pantograph
- Safety system(s): ATC/ATO
- Track gauge: 1,067 mm (3 ft 6 in)

The Sendai Subway 3000 series (仙台市交通局3000系) is a Japanese rapid transit electric multiple unit (EMU) train type operated by Sendai City Transportation Bureau for use on the Namboku Line in Sendai, Japan. Twenty-two sets are scheduled to be built by fiscal 2030 to replace the existing fleet of twenty-one 1000N series sets.

== Design ==
The 3000 series trains have aluminium alloy bodies. Like the preceding 1000N series trains, the new trains have L-shaped front ends and oval-shaped passenger door windows. Additionally, the height between the platform and the train has been reduced from the 60 mm (2.4 in) of the 1000N series to 20 mm (0.79 in).

== Formations ==
The 3000 series sets are formed as shown below:

Car No.	1	2	3	4
Designation	Tc1	M1	M2	Tc2
Numbering	3131 :	3231 :	3331 :	3631 :
Weight (t)	32.0	36.4	35.8	31.9

== Interior ==
Passenger accommodation consists of longitudinal bench seating throughout, with each car having a wheelchair space. LCD passenger information screens are provided above the doorways.

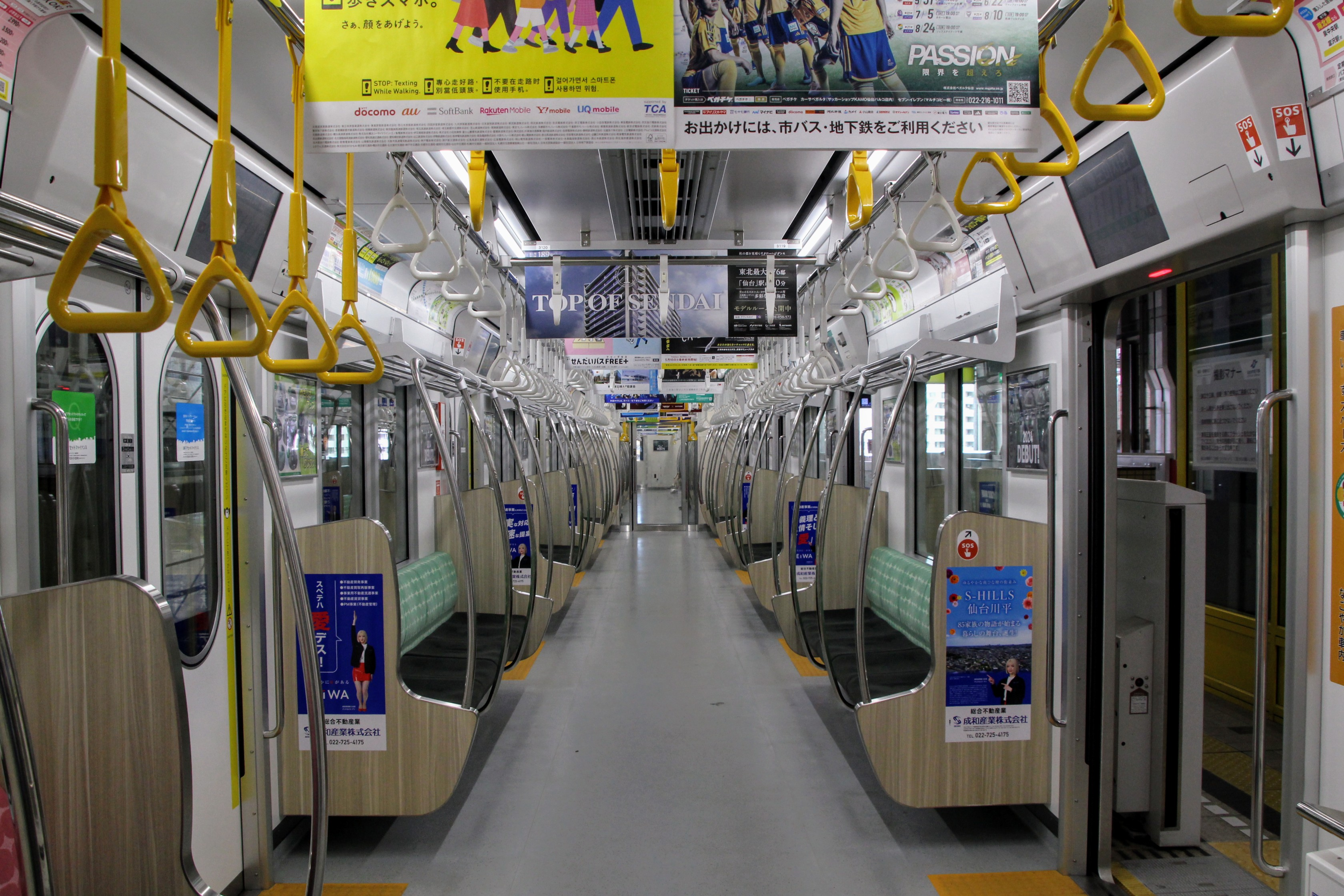
Interior view

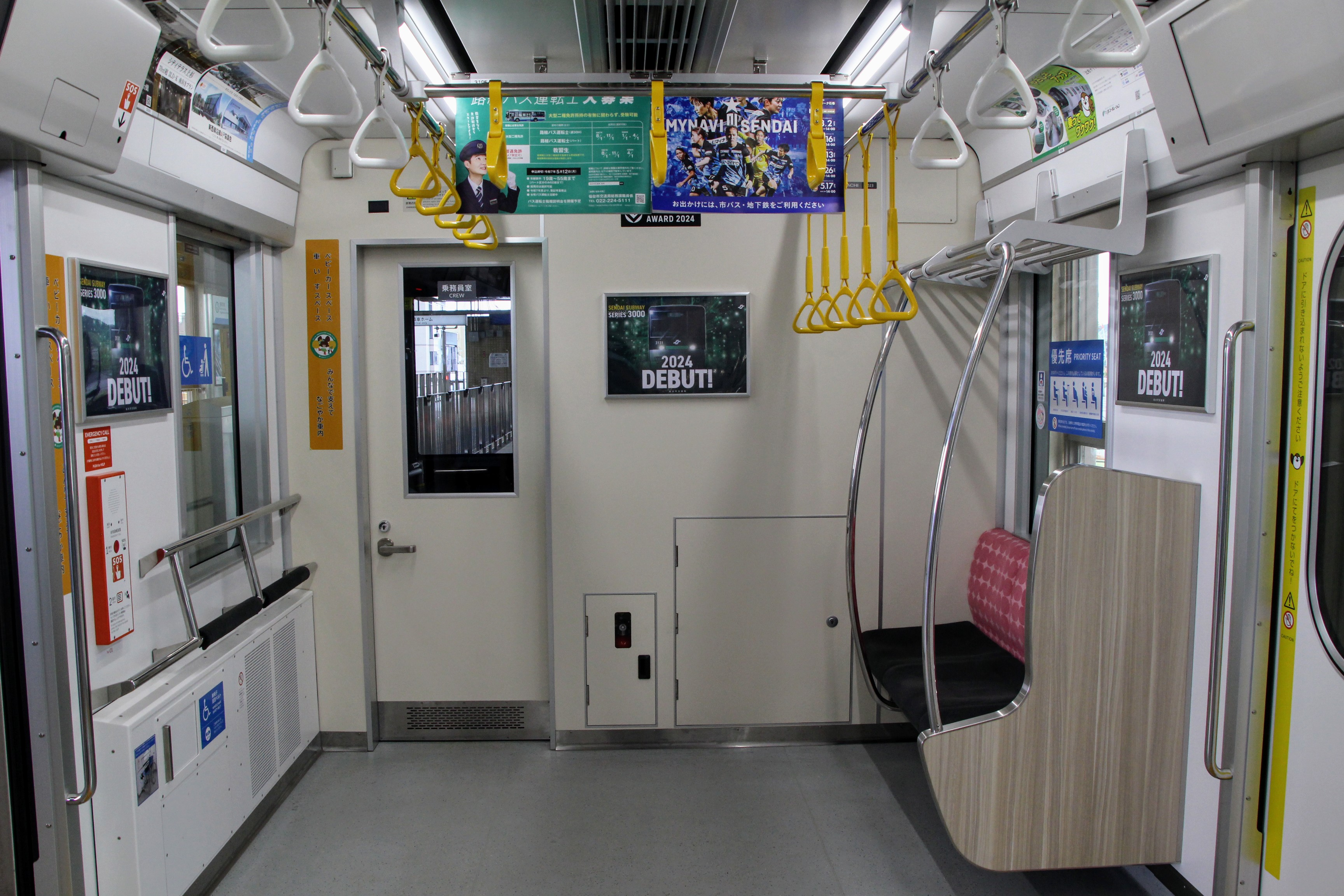
Priority seating and wheelchair space

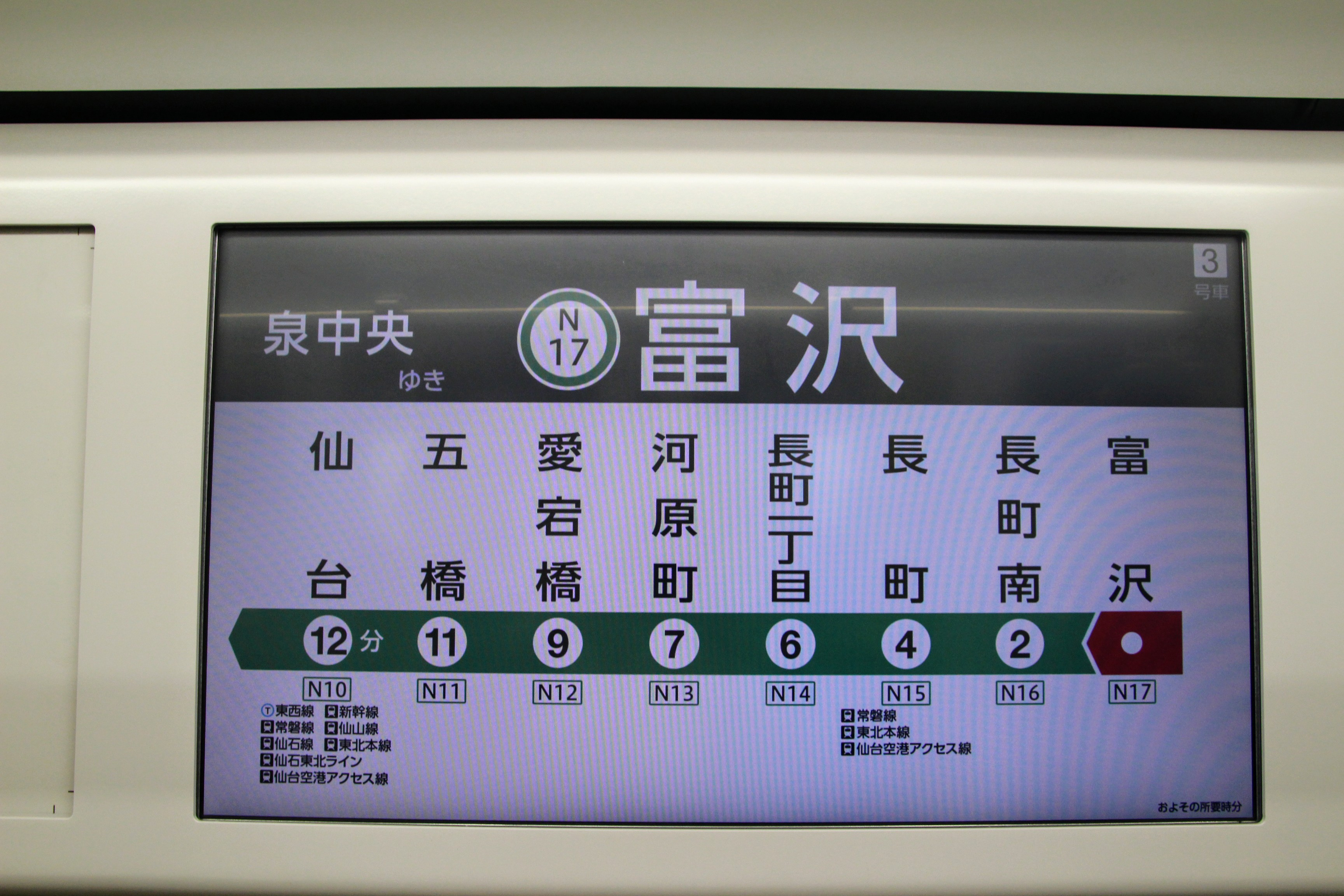
LCD passenger information display

== History ==
Details of the 3000 series on order were first officially announced in January 2020. The selected design of the 3000 series trains was announced on 18 May 2021 after a public vote that took place in March of the same year. The first set was delivered to Tomizawa Depot in September 2023. Daytime test-running commenced on 14 February 2024.

On 16 October 2024, the Sendai City Transportation Bureau and Hitachi announced that the 3000 series received the 2024 Good Design Award.

The train type entered revenue service on 24 October 2024.
