= Tomizawa Station =

Metro station in Sendai, Japan

N17 Tomizawa Station 富沢駅
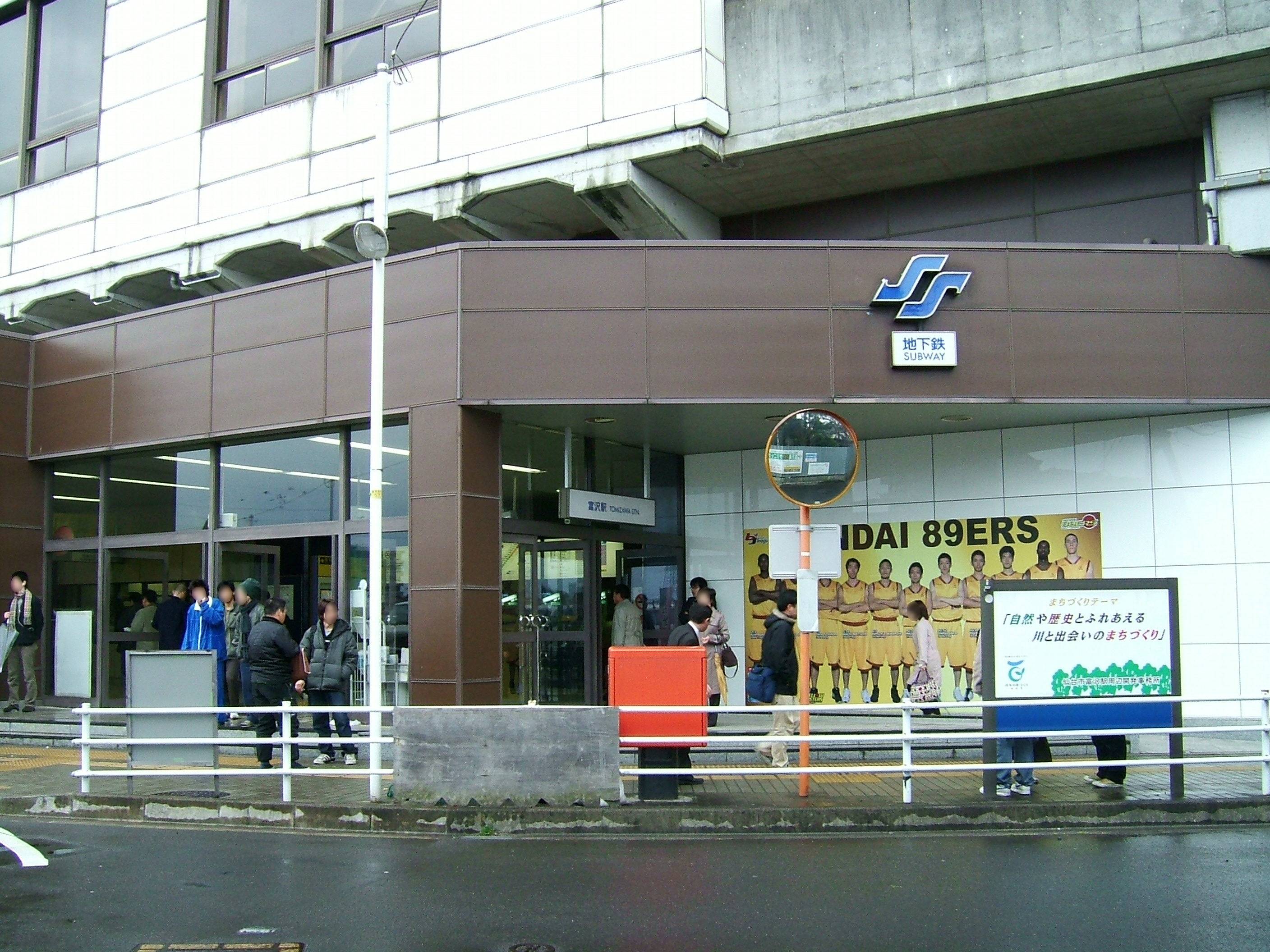
- Tomizawa Station in March 2007

General information
- Location: 4-2-22 Tomizawa, Taihaku-ku, Sendai-shi, Miyagi-ken 982-0032; Japan
- Coordinates: 38°12′51″N 140°52′14″E
- System: Sendai Subway station
- Operator: Sendai City Transportation Bureau
- Line: Namboku Line
- Connections: Bus stop

Other information
- Status: Staffed
- Station code: N17
- Website: Official website

History
- Opened: 15 July 1987; 39 years ago

Passengers
- FY2015 (Daily): 6,635

Services
Preceding station	Sendai Subway	Following station
Terminus	Namboku Line	Nagamachi-Minami N16 towards Izumi-Chūō
Location
- Location within Miyagi Prefecture Location within Japan

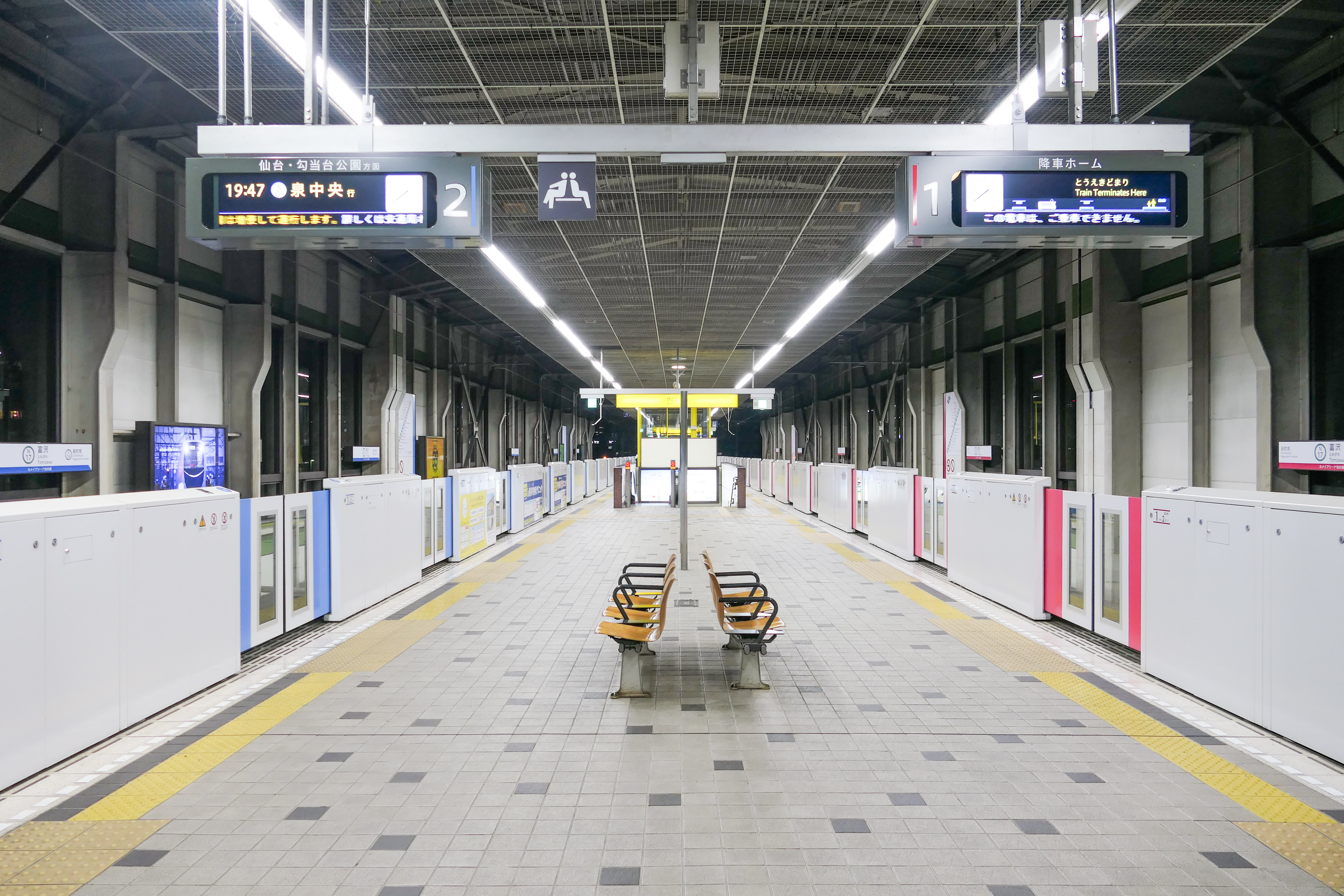
The platforms

Tomizawa Station (富沢駅, Tomizawa eki) is a metro station on the Sendai Subway Namboku Line in Taihaku-ku, Sendai, Miyagi Prefecture, Japan.

== Lines ==
Tomizawa Station is a terminal station on the Sendai Subway Namboku Line and is located 14.8 rail kilometers from the opposing terminus of the line at Izumi-Chūō.

== Station layout ==
Tomizawa Station is an elevated station with a single island platform serving two tracks. The station building is located underneath the tracks.

=== Platforms ===
1	■ Namboku Line	■ Alighting passengers only
2	■ Namboku Line	■ for Sendai, Izumi-Chūō

== Passenger statistics ==
In fiscal 2015, the station was used by an average of 6,635 passengers daily.

== Surrounding area ==
- Kamei Arena Sendai (The home arena of the Sendai 89ers of Bj league.)
- Sendai Tramway Museum (Sendai Shiden Museum)

== History ==
Tomizawa Station was opened on 15 July 1987.
