= Sendai Subway =

Metro system in Sendai, Japan

Coordinates: 38.26822°N 140.86942°E

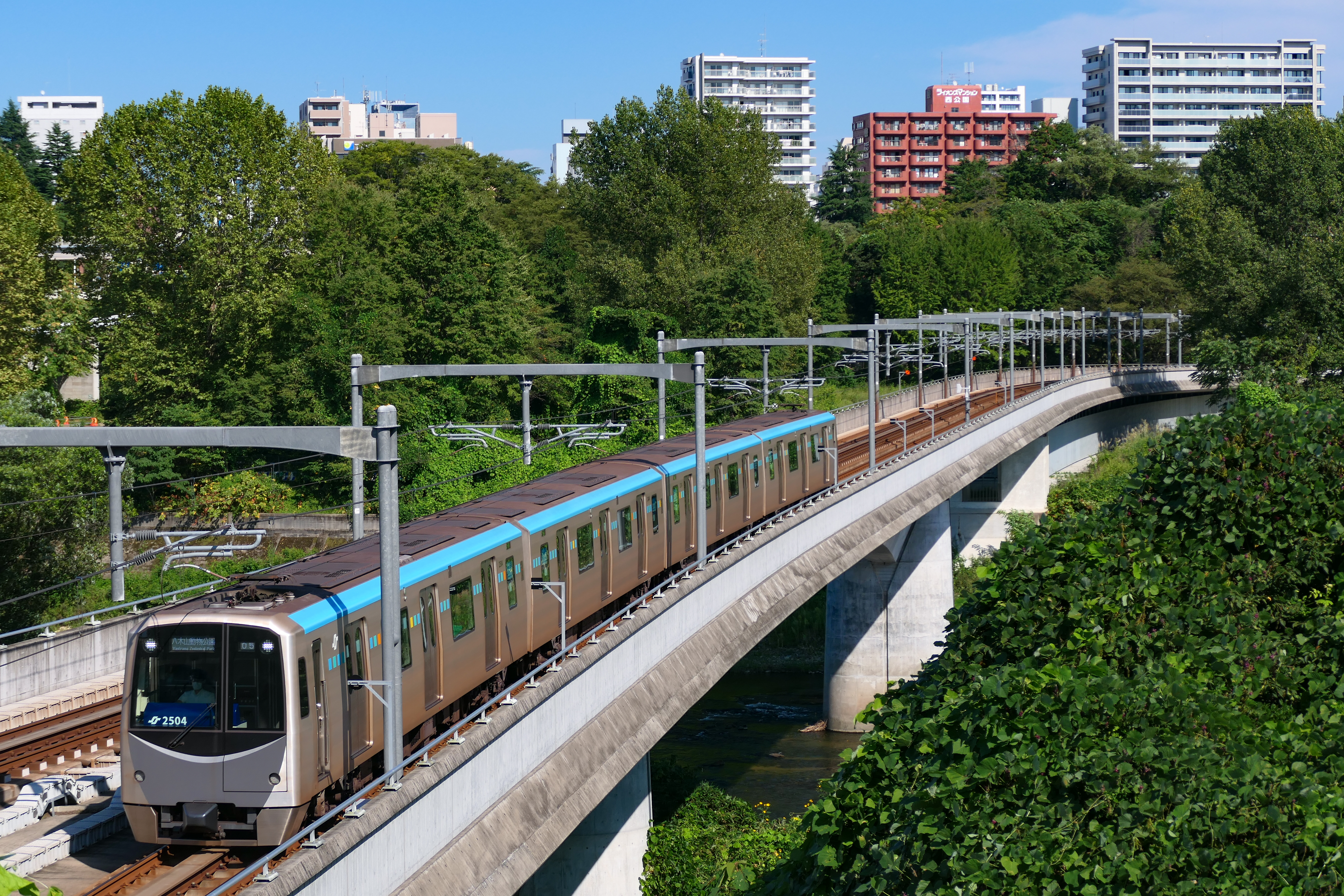
- 2000 Series

Overview
- Native name: 仙台市地下鉄; Sendai-shi Chikatetsu
- Locale: Sendai, Miyagi Prefecture, Japan
- Transit type: Rapid transit
- Number of lines: 2
- Number of stations: 30

Operation
- Began operation: July 15, 1987; 39 years ago
- Operator: Sendai City Transportation Bureau

Technical
- System length: 28.7 km (17.8 mi)
- Track gauge: 1,067 mm (3 ft 6 in) (Note: Namboku Line) 1,435 mm (4 ft 8 1/2 in) (Note: Tōzai Line)

The Sendai Subway (仙台市地下鉄, Sendai-shi Chikatetsu) is a rapid transit system operating in Sendai, the largest city in Tohoku region and capital of Miyagi Prefecture, operated by the Sendai City Transportation Bureau.

The subway was damaged in the 11 March 2011 Tohoku earthquake and tsunami and shut down. It reopened on 29 April 2011.

== History ==
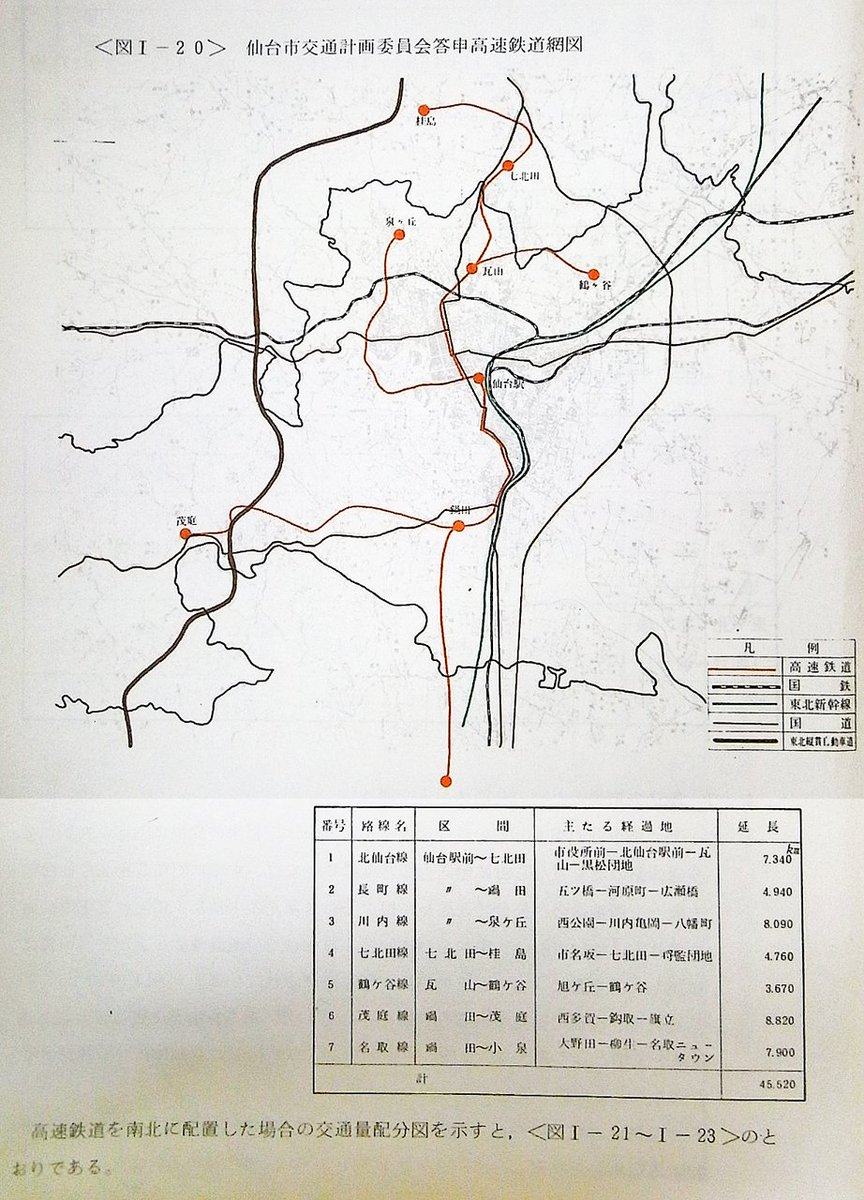
Proposed Sendai City Subway route map (1972)

Planning for the Sendai Subway began in the early 1960s amid rapid urbanization and increasing motorization in Sendai, the largest city in the Tōhoku region. In 1963, the Sendai Transportation Planning Committee was established to examine long-term urban transport needs and identified an underground railway as a key element of future mass transit. These studies led to the proposal of the Namboku Line as a principal north–south corridor connecting suburban residential districts with the city center. Despite Sendai’s relatively smaller population compared with major metropolitan areas such as Tokyo, the project received formal approval from the Sendai City Council in 1969, marking the city’s commitment to developing a subway system.

As road traffic congestion worsened, private automobiles increasingly encroached on the rights-of-way of the Sendai City tram (仙台市電). Although such use had initially been prohibited, restrictions were relaxed in 1966, further impairing the punctual operation of streetcars. Subsequent analyses by the Sendai City Transportation Planning Committee documented these problems and noted that route Sendai City Buses were similarly affected by congestion. During the same period, the city began formulating comprehensive urban road development plans to accommodate rising traffic demand. While the committee identified a subway as the most practical long-term solution, it also examined alternative concepts, including undergrounding tram lines, utilizing Japanese National Railways (JNR) freight corridors, and adopting a monorail system.

In 1972, the Sendai City Transportation Planning Committee proposed a route plan consisting of seven lines, with a total length of 45.52 km, as follows:

- Kitasendai Line (Line 1): Sendai – City Hall – Kitasendai – Kawarayama – Kuromatsu danchi – Nanakita
- Nagamachi Line (Line 2): Sendai – Itsutsubashi – Kawaramachi – Hirosebashi – Nabeta
- Kawauchi Line (Line 3): Sendai – Nishi koen – Kawauchi Kameoka – Yahatamachi – Izumigaoka
- Nanakita Line (Line 4): Shichikita – Ichinazaka – Nanakita – Shogen danchi – Katsurashima
- Tsurugaya Line (Line 5): Kawarayama – Asahigaoka – Tsurugatani
- Moniwa Line (Line 6): Nabeta – Nishitaga – Kagitori – Hatate – Moniwa
- Natori Line (Line 7): Nabeta – Yagyu – Natori New Town – Koizumi – Onoda

In 1975, the Ministry of Transport’s Sendai Land Transport Bureau issued a report recommending the urgent construction of an underground high-speed railway from the Nanakita area in Izumi City (present-day Izumi Ward) via Sendai Station.

Construction of the Namboku Line commenced in May 1981, following the acquisition of an operational license in May 1980 from relevant authorities. The initial 13.6 km section from Yaotome to Tomizawa opened on July 15, 1987, providing 16 stations and significantly alleviating surface congestion.

=== Expansion ===
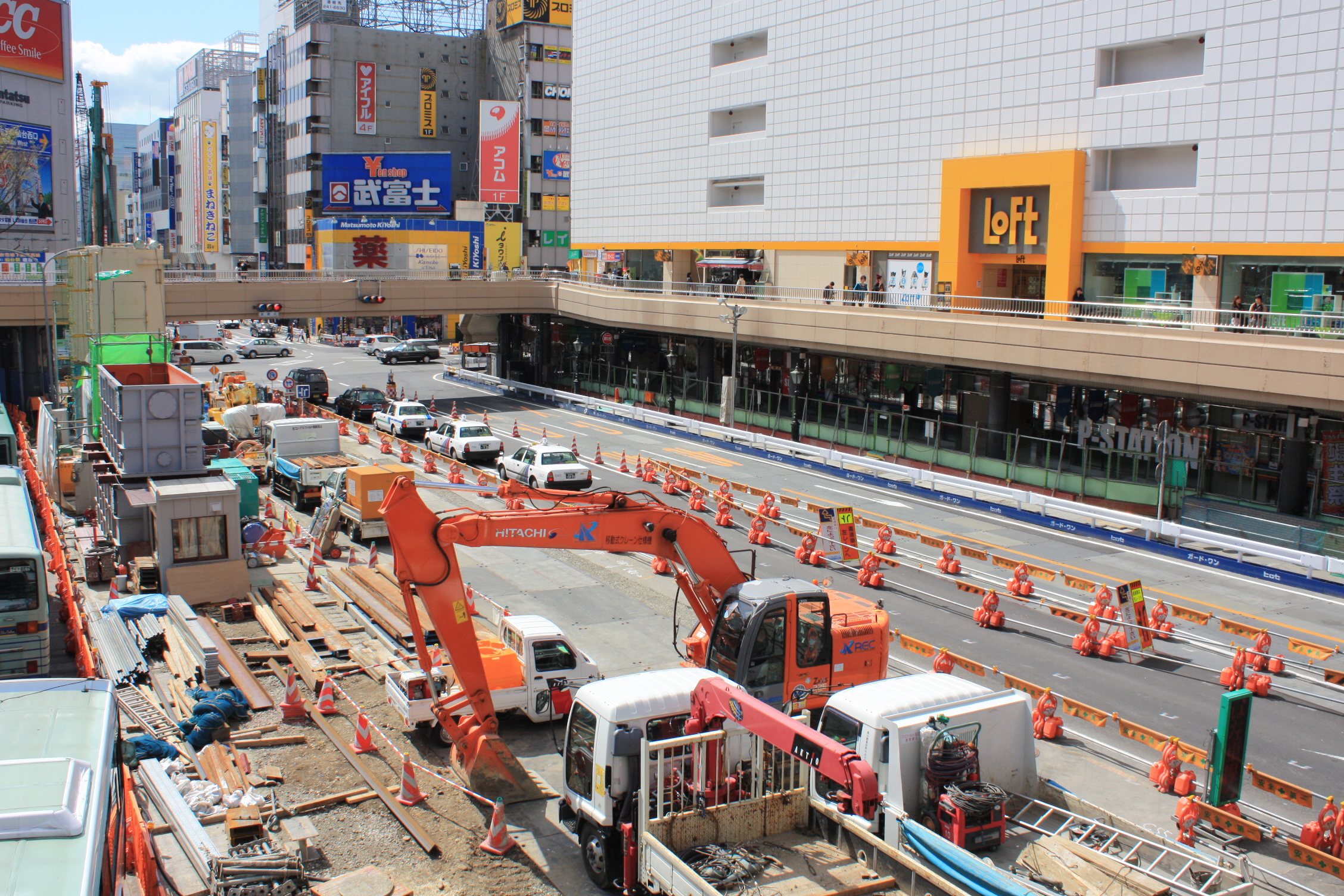
Construction of the Tōzai Line near Sendai Station

The Namboku Line was extended northward on July 15, 1992, with the opening of a 1.2-kilometer section between Yaotome and Izumi-Chūō. This expansion added one station and brought the line’s total length to 14.8 kilometers with 17 stations. The extension improved rail access to suburbs and schools in northern Sendai, contributing to increased ridership and supporting suburban development. Since then, no additional extensions have been made, and the line continues to function as the backbone of the Sendai Subway system.

The construction of the Tōzai Line, an east–west route approved in August 2005 following the granting of operating authorization in September 2003.

Construction was entrusted to the Japan Railway Construction, Transport and Technology Agency in November 2005 and proceeded despite delays caused by the 2011 Tōhoku earthquake. The entire 13.9-kilometer line, comprising 13 stations and incorporating both underground and elevated sections, commenced service on December 6, 2015. Running between Arai and Yagiyama Zoological Park and intersecting the Namboku Line at Sendai Station, the Tōzai Line completed the system’s basic cross-shaped layout.

== Lines ==
Name	Symbol	Route	Opened	Last extended	Length	Stations	Train Length
Namboku Line	N	Izumi-chuo – Tomizawa	1987	1992	14.8 km (9.2 mi)	17	4 cars
Tōzai Line	T	Yagiyama Zoological Park – Arai	2015	—N/a	13.9 km (8.6 mi)	13	4 cars

== Rolling stock ==
=== Namboku Line ===
- 1000N series：4-car EMUs, since July 1987
- 3000 series：4-car EMUs, since 24 October 2024

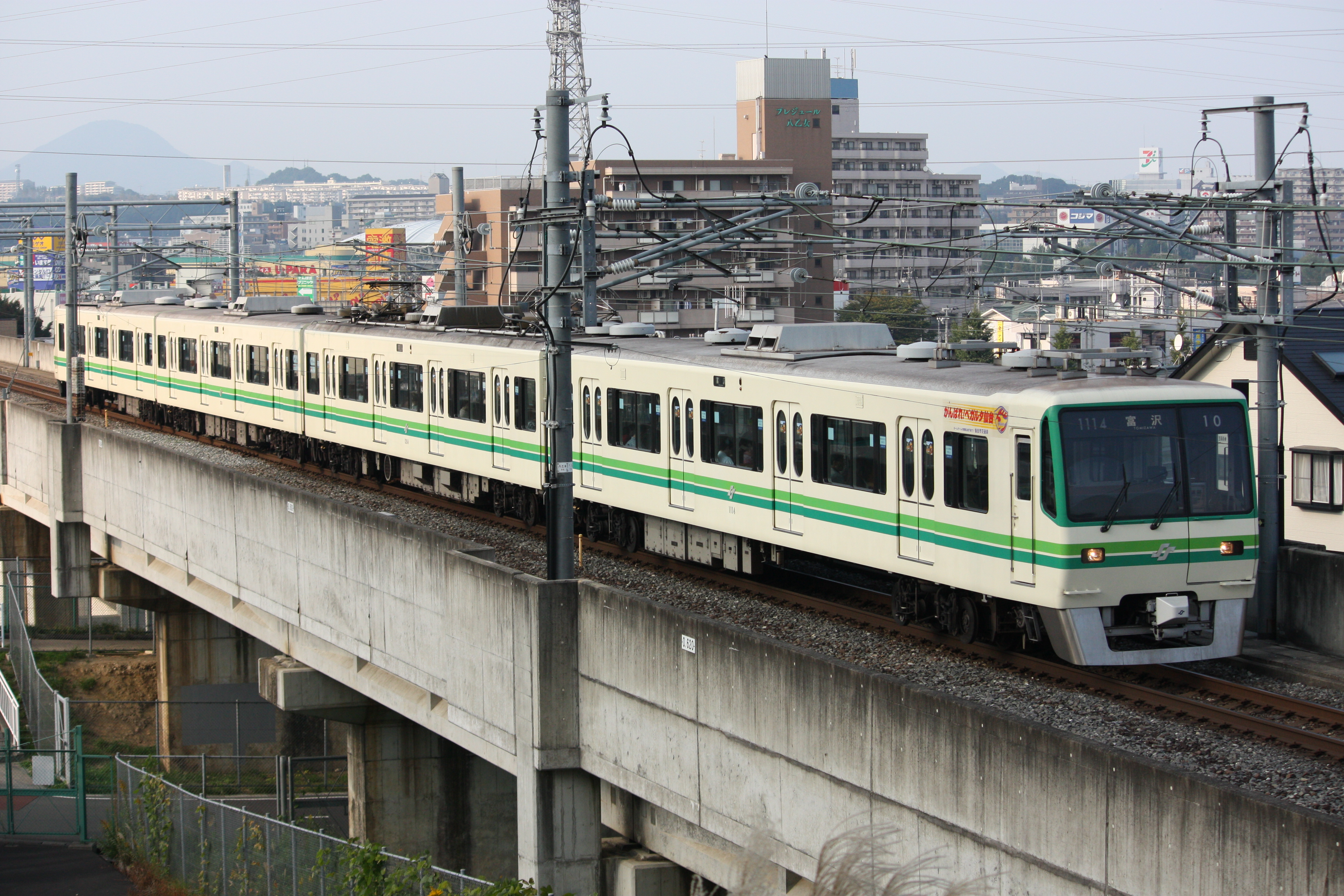
1000N series

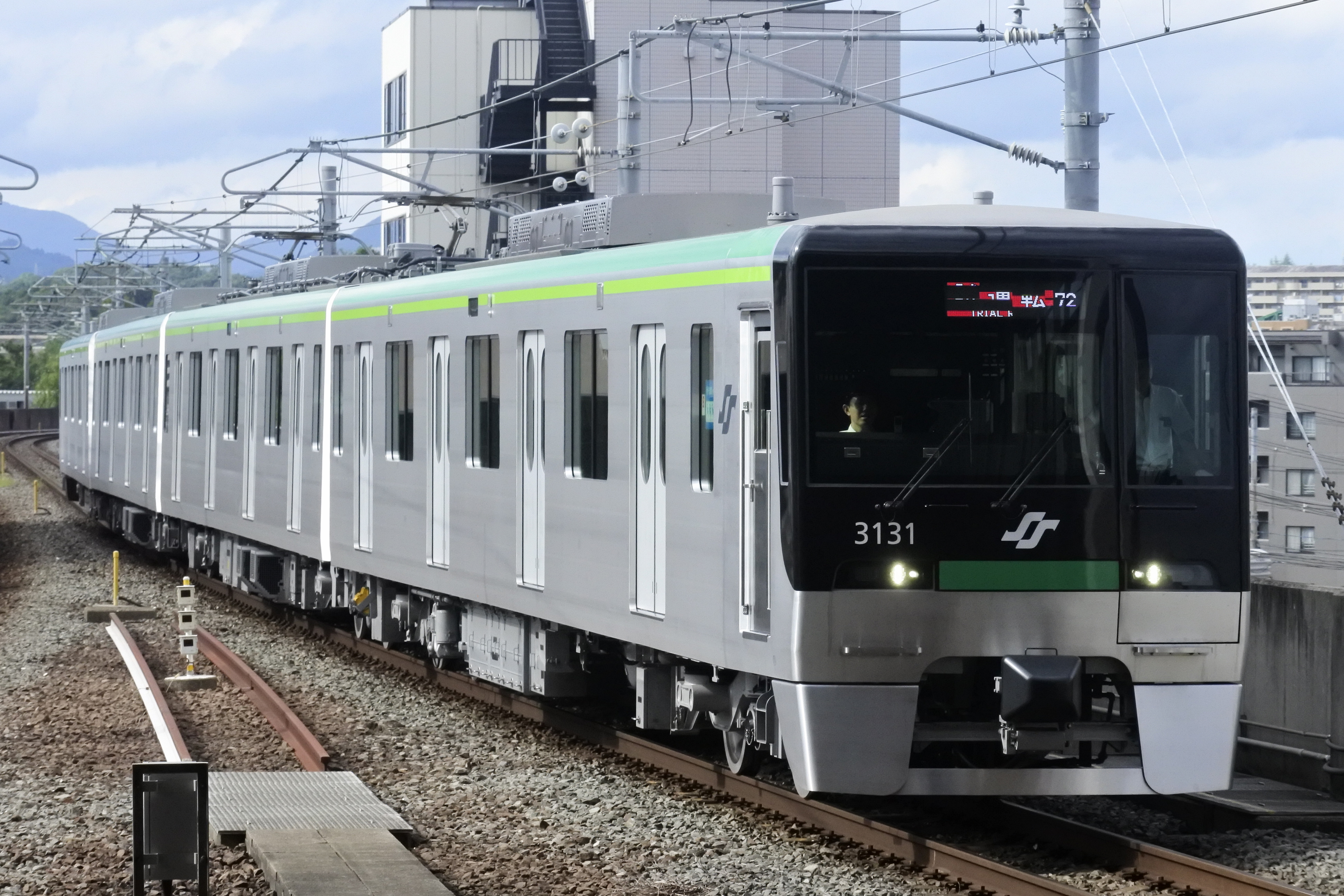
3000 series

=== Tōzai Line ===
- 2000 series: 4-car EMUs, since December 2015

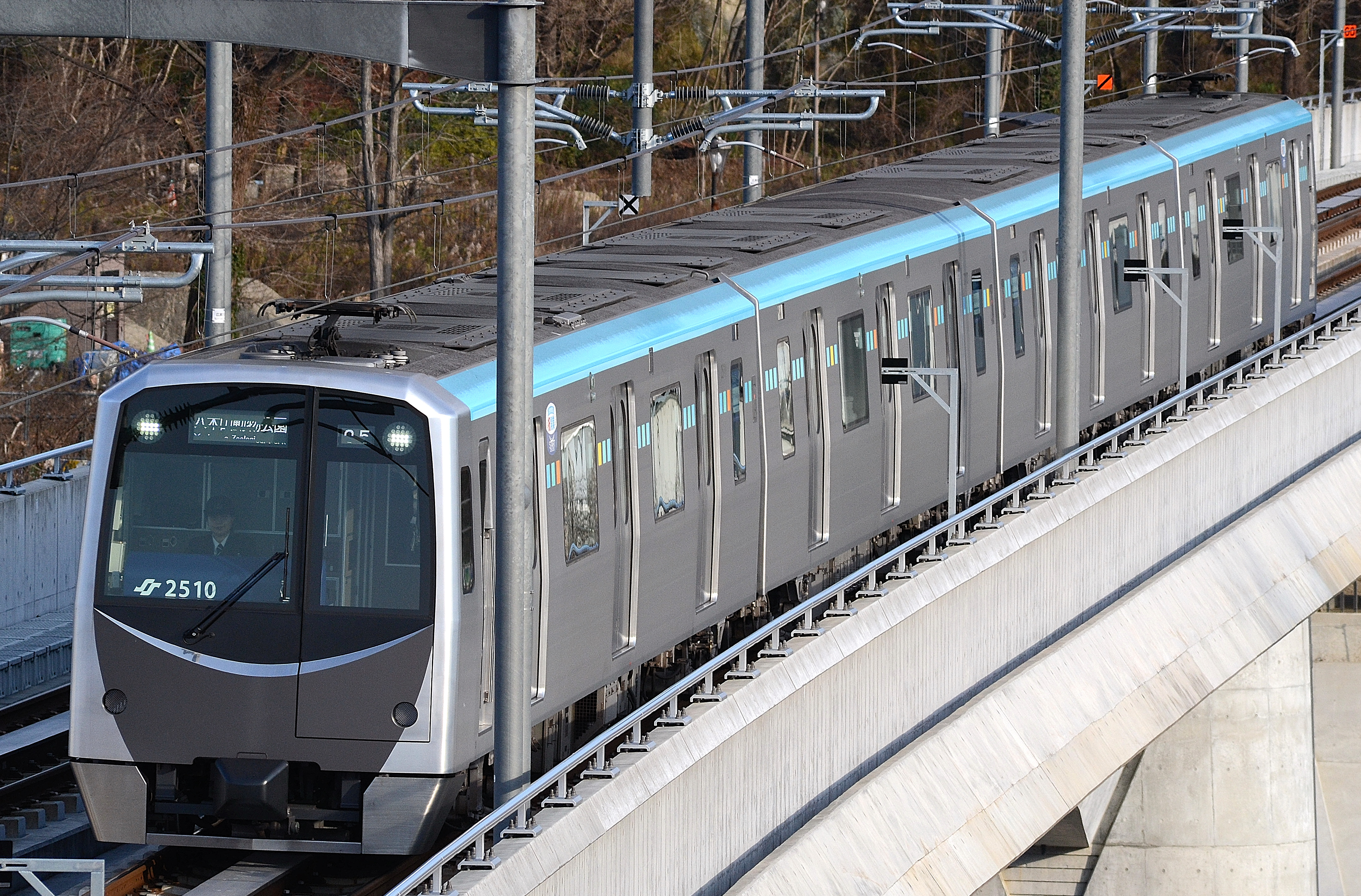
2000 series
