= Izumi-Chūō Station (Miyagi) =

Metro station in Sendai, Japan

N01 Izumi-Chūō Station Vegalta Sendai·Yursta-mae 泉中央駅 ベガルタ仙台・ユアスタ前
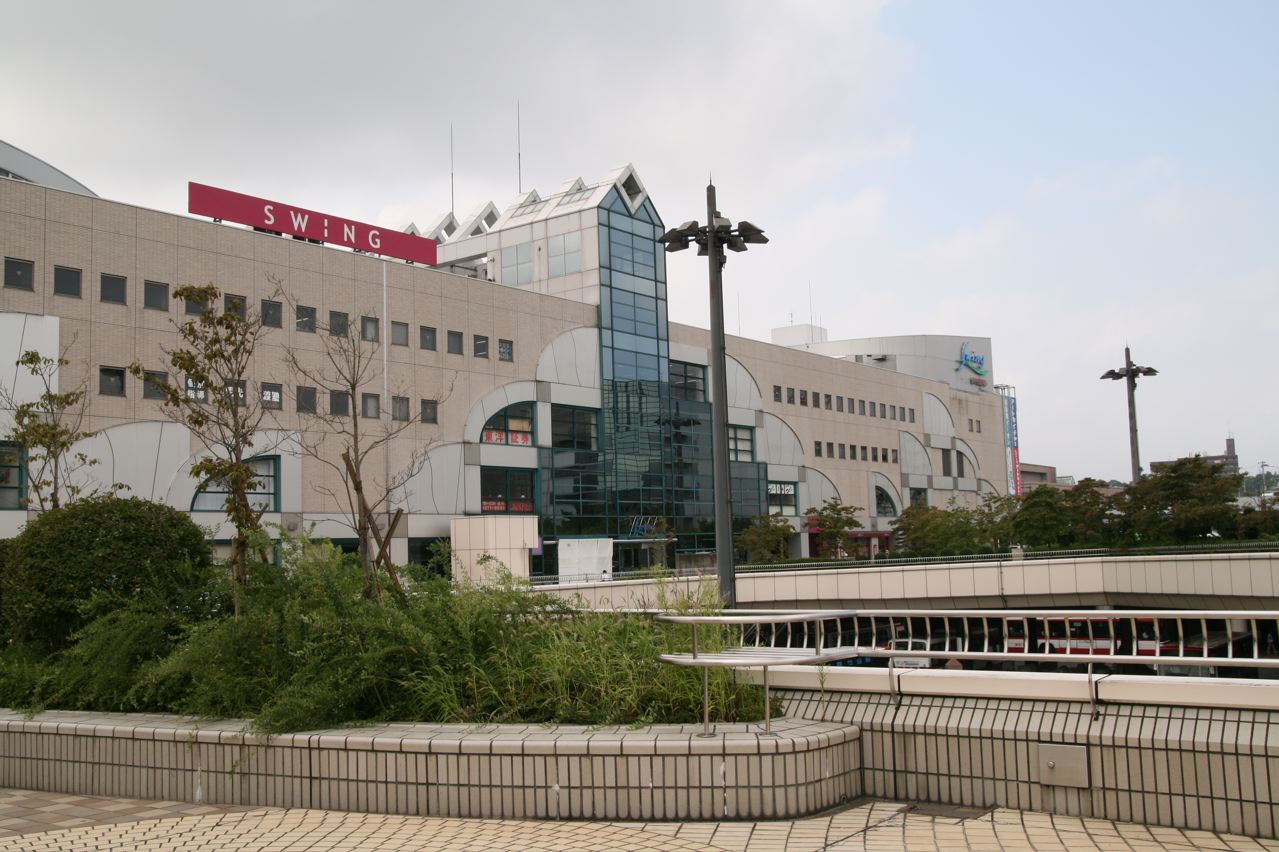
- Izumi-Chūō Station

General information
- Location: 7-1, Izumi-Chūō 1-chome, Izumi-ku, Sendai-shi, Miyagi-ken 981-3133; Japan
- Coordinates: 38°19′23″N 140°52′50″E
- System: Sendai Subway station
- Operator: Sendai City Transportation Bureau
- Line: Namboku Line
- Distance: 14.8 km (9.2 mi) from Tomizawa
- Platforms: 1 island platform
- Connections: Bus terminal

Other information
- Status: Staffed
- Station code: N01
- Website: Official website

History
- Opened: July 15, 1992; 34 years ago

Passengers
- Daily (FY2015): 25,102

Services
Preceding station	Sendai Subway	Following station
Yaotome N02 towards Tomizawa	Namboku Line	Terminus
Location
- Location within Miyagi Prefecture Location within Japan

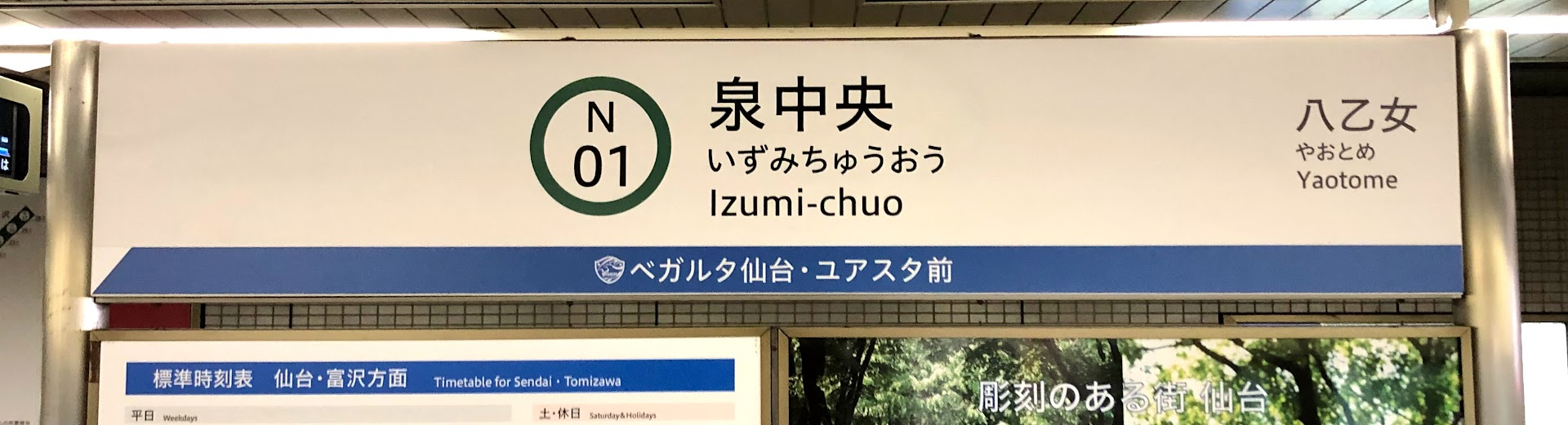
Vegalta Sendai・Yursta-mae

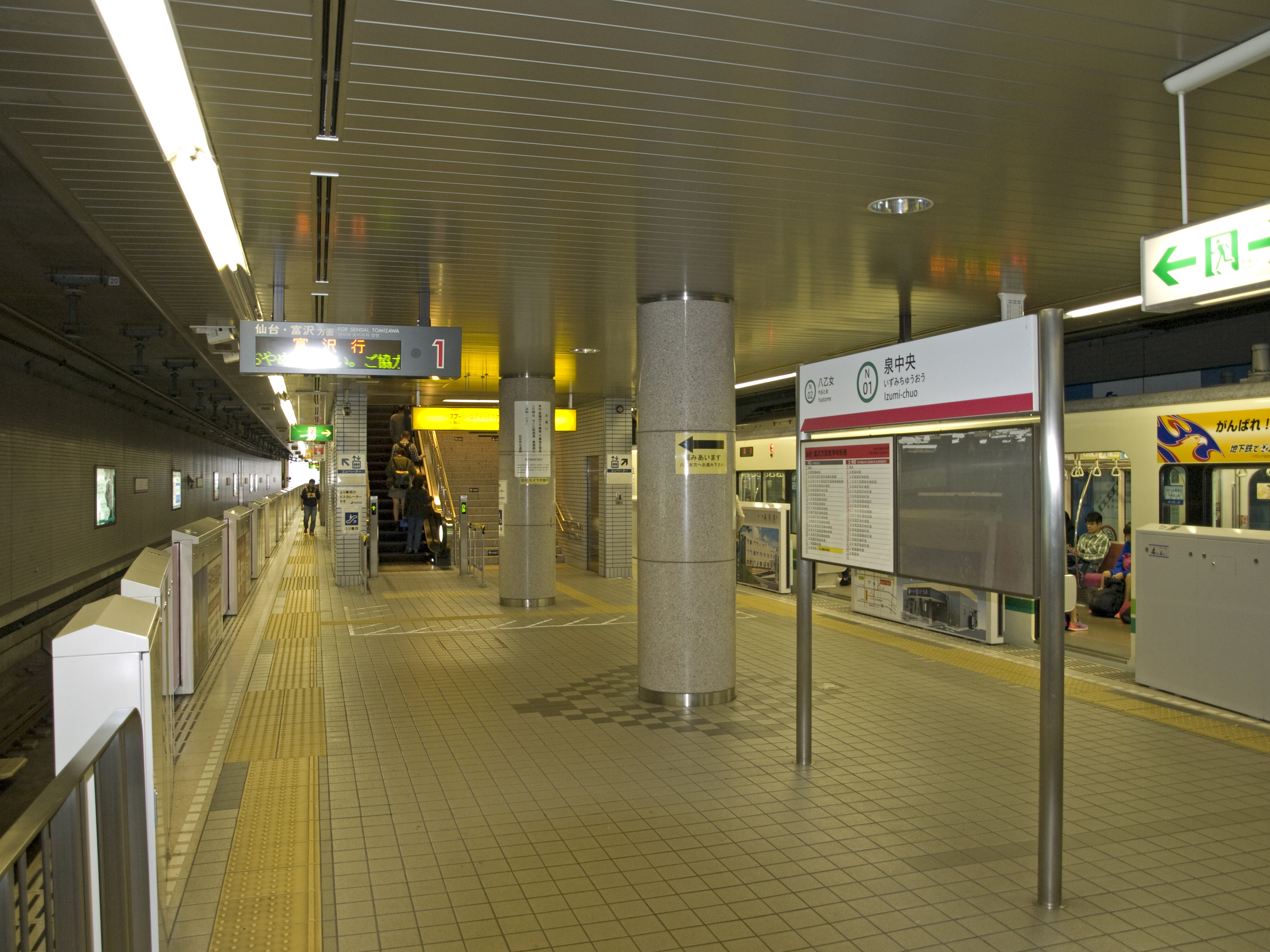
The platforms

Izumi-Chūō Station (泉中央駅, Izumi-Chūō eki) is a terminal underground metro station on the Sendai Subway Namboku Line in Izumi-ku, Sendai, Miyagi Prefecture, Japan. In 2023, the sub-station was named Vegalta Sendai·Yursta-mae. In addition to being the northernmost subway station on the line, there is a large bus terminal for commuters to continue on towards the farthest reaches of Sendai, as well as neighboring towns such as Rifu and Tomiya.The area around Izumi-Chūō Station is highly commercial, with many shops, restaurants, night clubs, and other amenities.

Due to traffic congestion near the only exit of the original station, the city undertook a construction project to extend the underground passageway to an area which could facilitate more vehicles. That project was finished in 2005.

In May 2024, it was wrapped to commemorate Vegalta Sendai's 30th anniversary. (See Gallery for details)

== Lines ==
Izumi-Chūō Station is a station on the Sendai Subway Namboku Line, and is located 14.8 kilometers from the opposing terminal at Tomizawa.

== Station layout ==
Izumi-Chūō Station is an underground station with a single island platform serving two tracks. The trains leave in the opposite direction from the same track they arrived.

=== Platforms ===
1	■ Namboku Line	■ for Sendai, Tomizawa
2	■ Nanboku Line	■ for Sendai, Tomizawa

== History ==
Izumi-Chūō Station was opened on July 15, 1992. On December 1, 2004 the first phase of expansion (second ticket gate, north entrance) was completed and on April 1, 2005 the northern expansion is completed, with underground passageways to Izumity 21 and the Izumi ward office. Operations were temporarily halted from March 11 to April 29, 2011 due to the effects of the 2011 Tōhoku earthquake and tsunami.

== Passenger statistics ==
In fiscal 2015, the station was used by an average of 25,102 passengers daily.

== Surrounding area ==
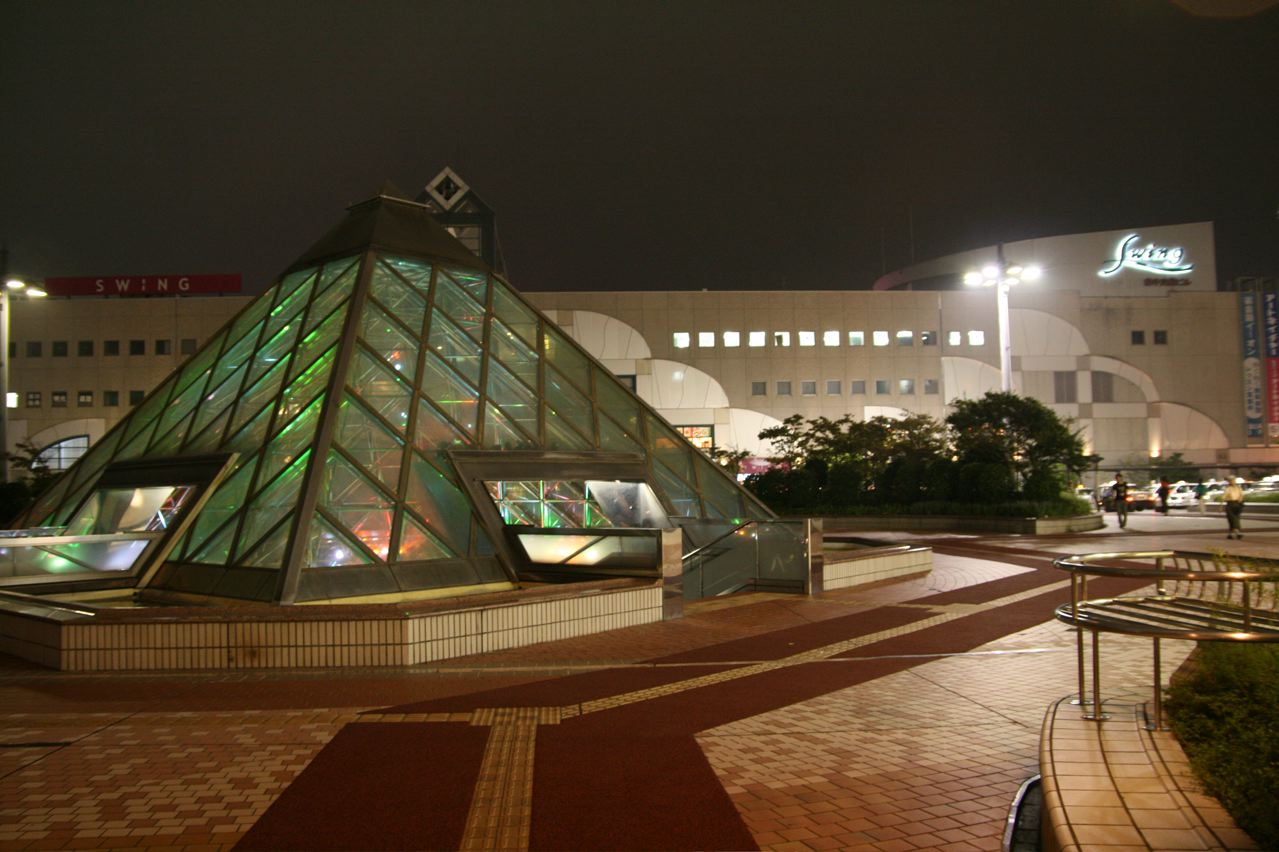
Pedestrian walkway between Izumi-Chūō Station, bus terminal, and department stores

- Izumi Ward Office
- Izumi Police Station
- Sendai City Izumi Library
- Sendai Children's Space Center
- Izumity 21
- Yurtec Stadium Sendai
- Nanakita Park (Pokémon GO Fest 2024)

== Gallery ==
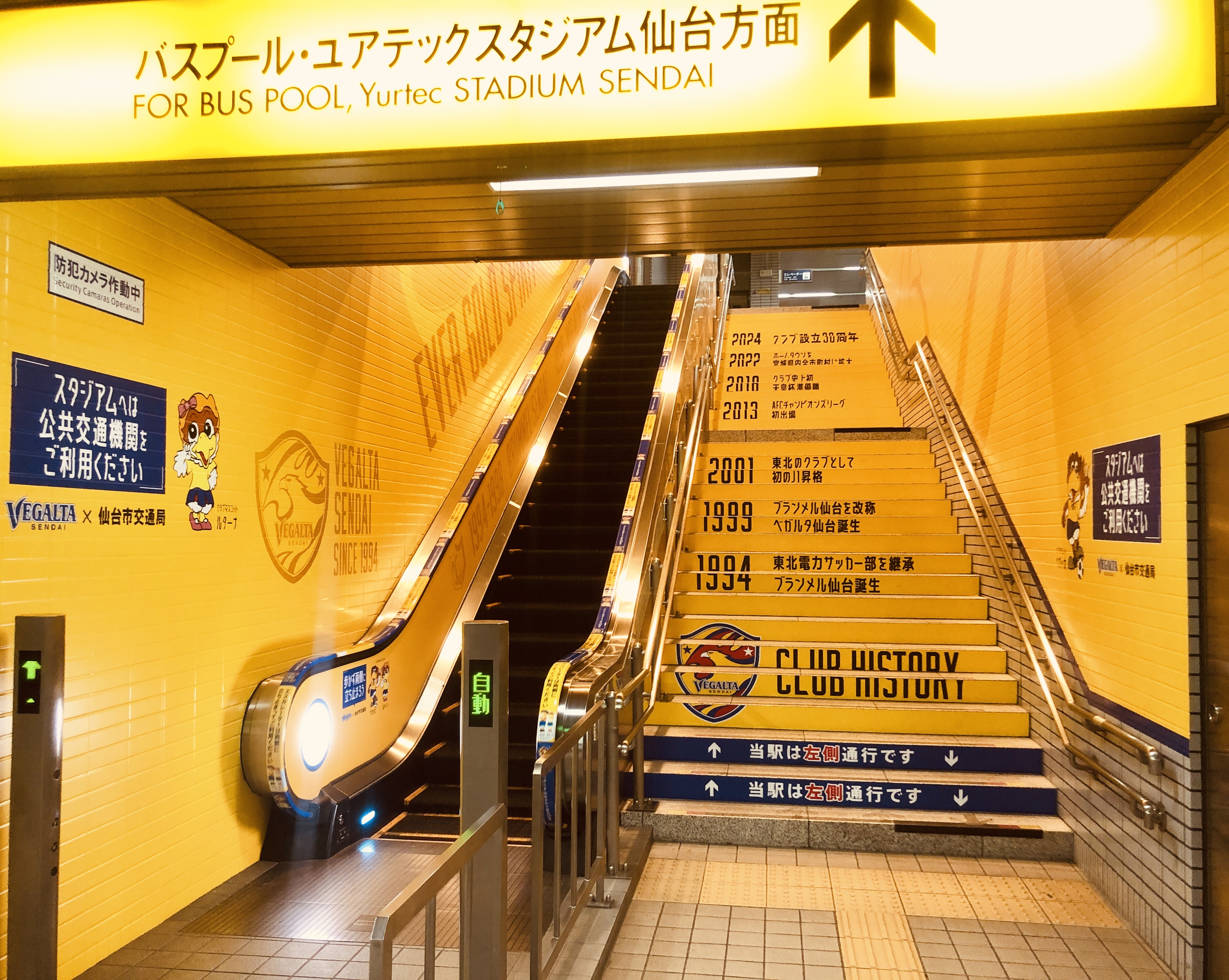
Stairs to ticket gate (From May 25, 2024 to the end of January 2025.)

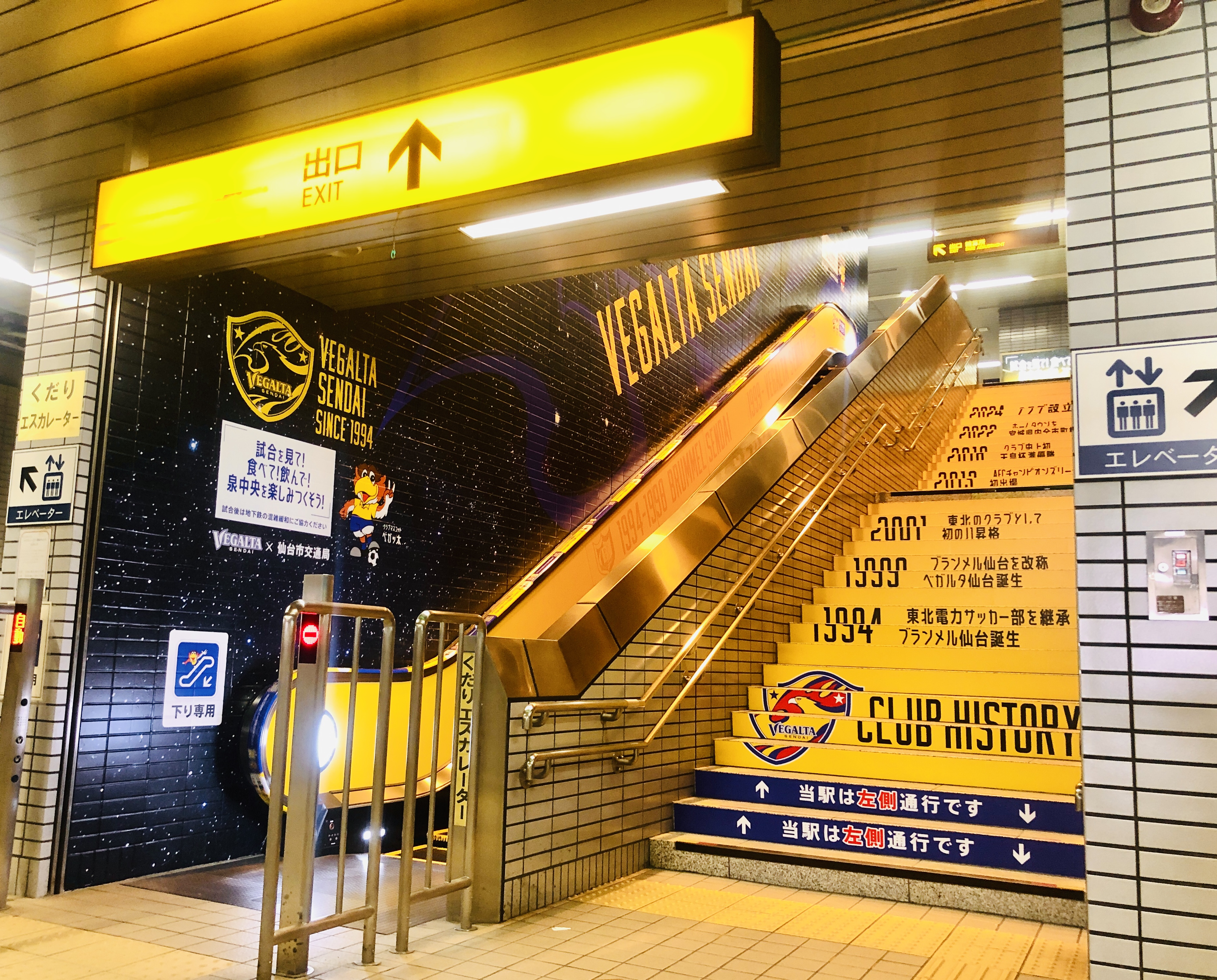
Stairs to platform
