= Minami-Sendai Station =

Railway station in Sendai, Japan

Minami-Sendai Station 南仙台駅
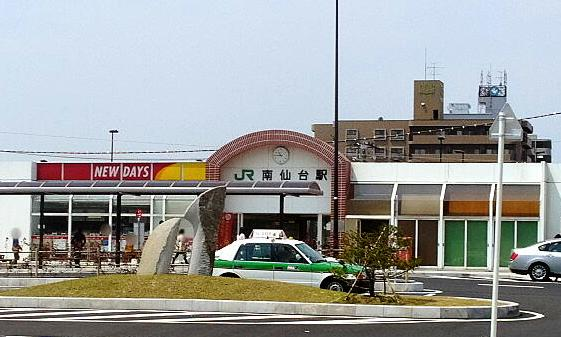
- Minami-Sendai Station, West Exit June 2008

General information
- Location: 5-2-1 Tanaka, Taihaku-ku, Sendai-shi, Miyagi-ken 981-1104; Japan
- Coordinates: 38.1972475°N 140.8836079°E
- Operator: JR East; Sendai Airport Transit; Sendai Subway
- Line: Tōhoku Main Line
- Distance: 344.1 km from Tokyo
- Platforms: 1 side + 1 island platform
- Tracks: 3

Other information
- Status: Staffed (Midori no Madoguchi)
- Website: Official website

History
- Opened: September 10, 1924
- Former names: Rikuzen-Nakata (until 1963)

Passengers
- FY2018: 9,998 daily

Services
Preceding station	JR East	Following station
Natori towards Fukushima	Tōhoku Main Line Rapid City Rabbit	Nagamachi towards Sendai
Natori towards Kuroiso	Tōhoku Main Line Local	Taishidō towards Morioka
Natori towards Shinagawa	Jōban Line Local-Futsuu	Taishidō towards Sendai
Preceding station	Sendai Airport Transit	Following station
Natori towards Sendai Airport	Sendai Airport Line	Taishidō towards Sendai
Location
- Location within Sendai Location within Miyagi Prefecture Location within Japan

Minami-Sendai Station (南仙台駅, Minami-Sendai-eki) is a junction railway station in Taihaku-ku, Sendai, Miyagi Prefecture, Japan, operated by East Japan Railway Company (JR East).

== Lines ==
Minami-Sendai Station is served by the Tōhoku Main Line, and is located 344.1 rail kilometers from the official starting point of the line at Tokyo. It is also served by the Joban Line, whose trains run past the official terminus at Iwanuma Station on to Sendai and by the Sendai Airport Line.

== Station layout ==
The station has a single side platform and a single island platform connected to the station building by a footbridge. The station has a Midori no Madoguchi staffed ticket office.

=== Platforms ===
1	■ Tōhoku Main Line	for Natori, Iwanuma, Shiroishi, Fukushima
1	■ Joban Line	for Natori, Watari, Haranomachi
1	■ Sendai Airport Line	for Sendai Airport
2	■ Tōhoku Main Line	for Sendai, Matsushima, Kogota
2	■ Sendai Airport Line	for Sendai
3	■ Tōhoku Main Line	for Sendai

== History ==
Minami-Sendai Station opened on September 10, 1924 as Rikuzen-Nakata Station (陸前中田駅). It adopted its present name on May 25, 1963. The station was absorbed into the JR East network upon the privatization of the Japanese National Railways (JNR) on April 1, 1987.

== Passenger statistics ==
In fiscal 2018, the station was used by an average of 9,998 passengers daily (boarding passengers only).

== Surrounding area ==
- National Route 4
- Sendai-Tanaka Post Office

== See also ==
- List of railway stations in Japan
