= Mitazono Station =

Railway station in Natori, Miyagi Prefecture, Japan

Mitazono Station 美田園駅
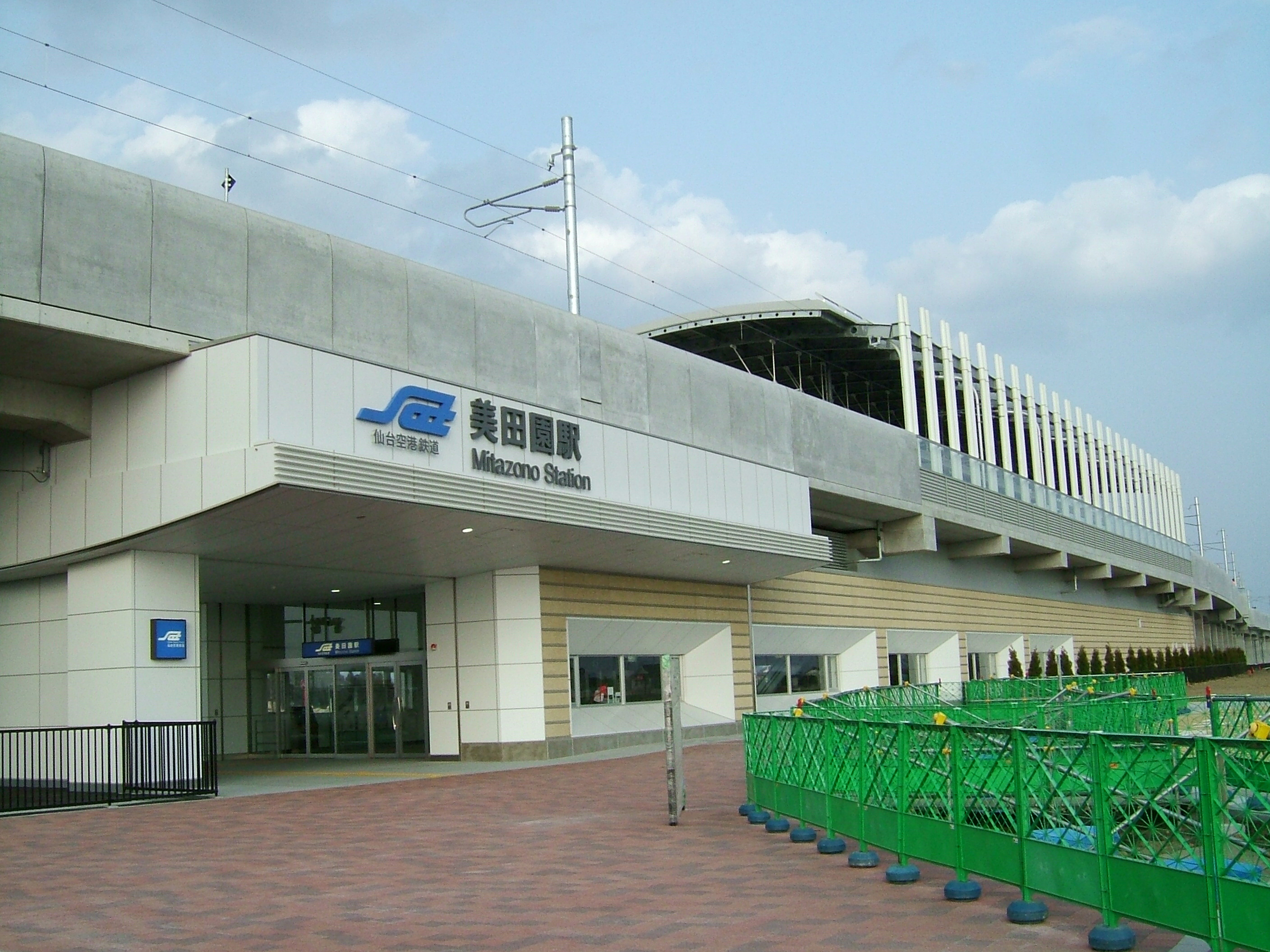
- Mitazono Station, March 2007

General information
- Location: 5 Chome-2 Mitazono; Natori, Miyagi; Japan
- Coordinates: 38°09′35″N 140°55′03″E
- Operator: Sendai Airport Transit
- Line: Sendai Airport Access Line
- Distance: 3.8 km (2.4 mi) from Natori
- Platforms: 1 island platform
- Tracks: 2

Construction
- Structure type: Elevated

Other information
- Status: Staffed
- Website: Official website

History
- Opened: 18 March 2007

Passengers
- FY2018: 1,437 daily

Services
Preceding station	Sendai Airport Transit	Following station
Sendai Airport Terminus	Sendai Airport Line	Morisekinoshita towards Sendai
Location
- Location within Miyagi Prefecture Location within Japan

Mitazono Station (Japanese: 美田園駅, Hepburn: Mitazono eki) is a railway station in the city of Natori, Miyagi, Japan, operated by third-sector railway operator Sendai Airport Transit (SAT).

== Lines ==
Mitazono Station is served by the Sendai Airport Line and is 14.2 kilometres (8.8 mi) from Sendai and 3.8 kilometres (2.4 mi) from the terminus of the line at Sendai Airport.

== Station layout ==
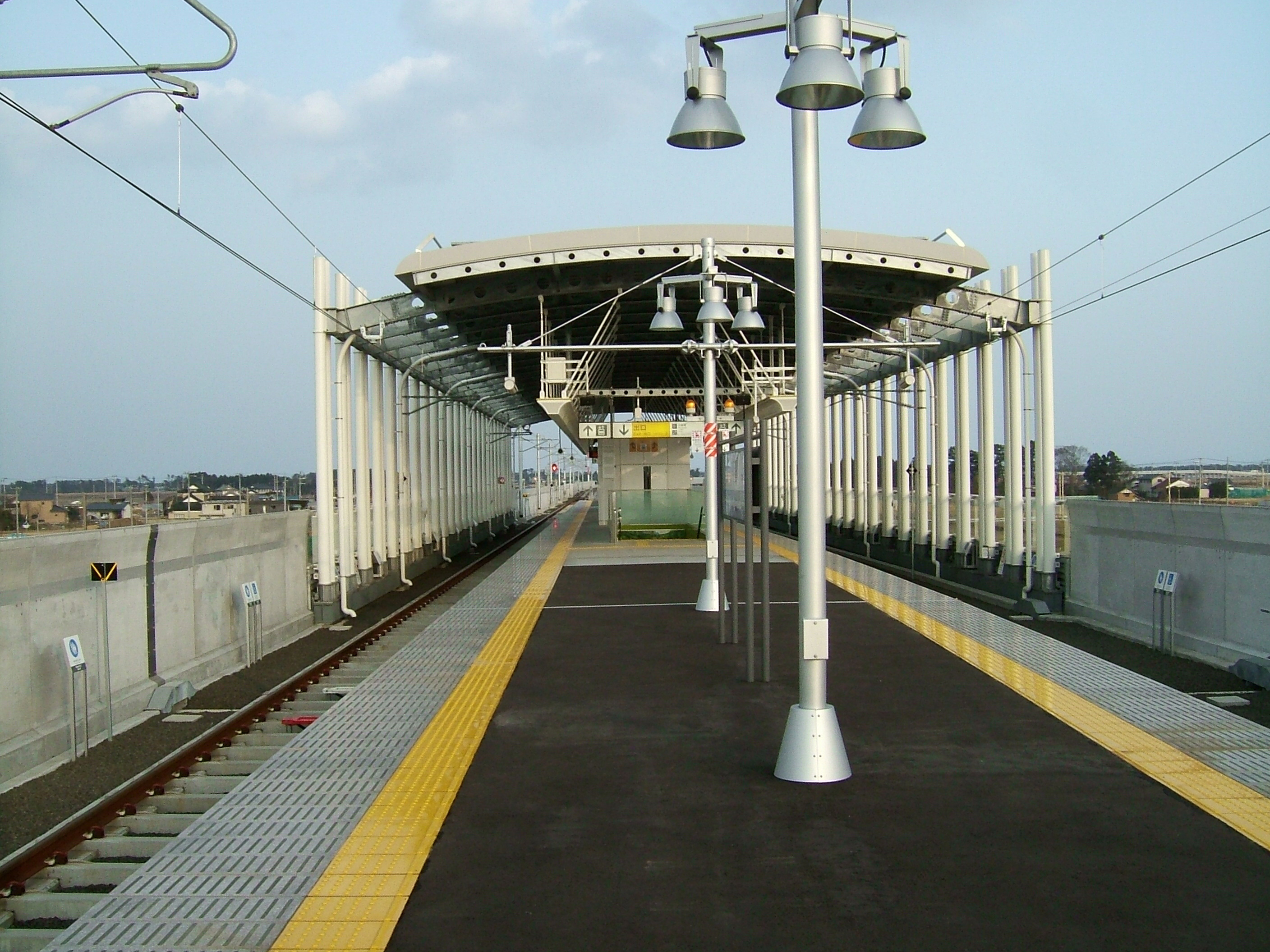
View of platforms

The station consists of an elevated island platform serving two tracks, allowing trains to pass on the otherwise single line. Both tracks are bi-directional, with platform 2 used (mostly for Sendai-bound trains) only when trains cross here.

== History ==
The station opened on 18 March 2007, coinciding with the opening of the Sendai Airport Line. The line was severely damaged by the 2011 Tōhoku earthquake and tsunami and service was suspended indefinitely from 11 March 2011, not reopening until 1 October, nearly 7 months later.

== Passenger statistics ==
In fiscal 2018, the station was used by an average of 1,437 passengers daily (boarding passengers only).

== Surrounding area ==
Mitazono Station is situated in a largely residential suburban district in Natori, Miyagi. The area includes the planned Mitazono housing estate, which comprises over 1,300 homes across different low‑density residential zones. There are also local commercial facilities, hotels, and welfare complexes nearby. Additionally, Mitazono Central Park is located close to the station, providing community green space for residents.

== See also ==
- List of railway stations in Japan
