= Morisekinoshita Station =

Railway station in Natori, Miyagi Prefecture, Japan

Morisekinoshita Station 杜せきのした駅
- Morisekinoshita Station, October 2026

General information
- Location: 5 Chome Morisekinoshita; Natori, Miyagi; Japan
- Coordinates: 38°09′55″N 140°53′45″E
- Operator: Sendai Airport Transit
- Line: Sendai Airport Access Line
- Distance: 1.8 km (1.1 mi) from Natori
- Platforms: 1 side platform
- Tracks: 1

Construction
- Structure type: Elevated

Other information
- Status: Staffed
- Website: Official website

History
- Opened: 18 March 2007

Passengers
- FY2018: 3,174 daily

Services
Preceding station	Sendai Airport Transit	Following station
Mitazono towards Sendai Airport	Sendai Airport Line	Natori towards Sendai
Location
- Location within Miyagi Prefecture Location within Japan

Morisekinoshita Station (Japanese: 杜せきのした駅, Hepburn: Morisekinoshita-eki) is a railway station in the city of Natori, Miyagi, Japan, operated by third-sector railway operator Sendai Airport Transit (SAT).

== Lines ==
Morisekinoshita Station is served by the Sendai Airport Line and is 12.2 kilometres (7.6 mi) from Sendai and 1.8 kilometres (1.1 mi) from the terminus of the line at Sendai Airport.

== Station layout ==
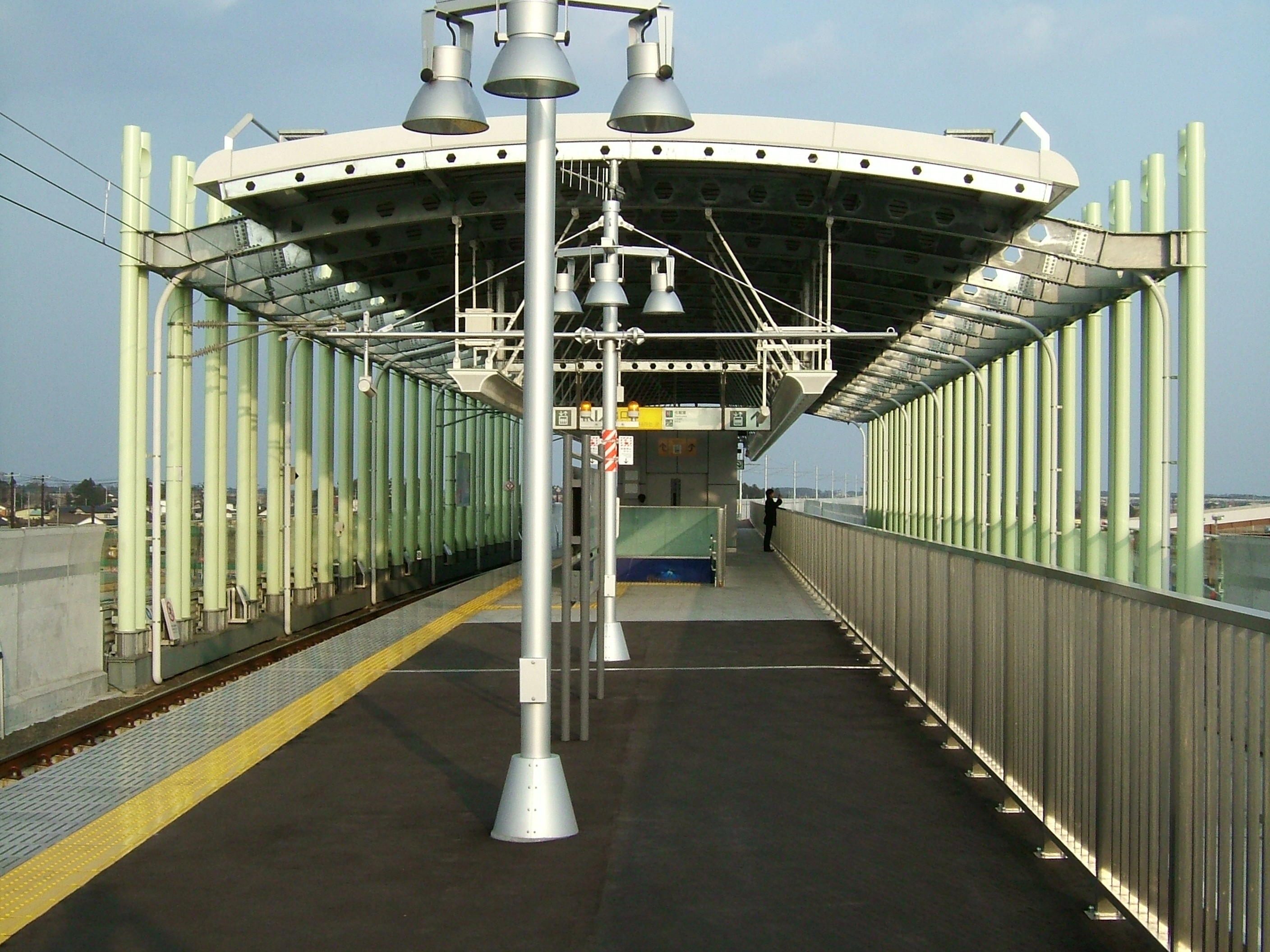
Platform view

The station consists of an elevated side platform serving one bi-directional track, with provision for a second track on the other side that would make it an island platform to be installed at a later date, and the station building underneath.

== History ==
The station opened on 18 March 2007, coinciding with the opening of the Sendai Airport Line. The line was severely damaged by the 2011 Tōhoku earthquake and tsunami and service was suspended indefinitely from 11 March 2011, not reopening until 1 October, nearly seven months later.

== Passenger statistics ==
In fiscal 2018, the station was used by an average of 3,174 passengers daily (boarding passengers only).

== Surrounding area ==
- Aeon Mall Natori shopping mall

== See also ==
- List of railway stations in Japan
