= Taishidō Station =

Railway station in Sendai, Japan

Taishidō Station 太子堂駅
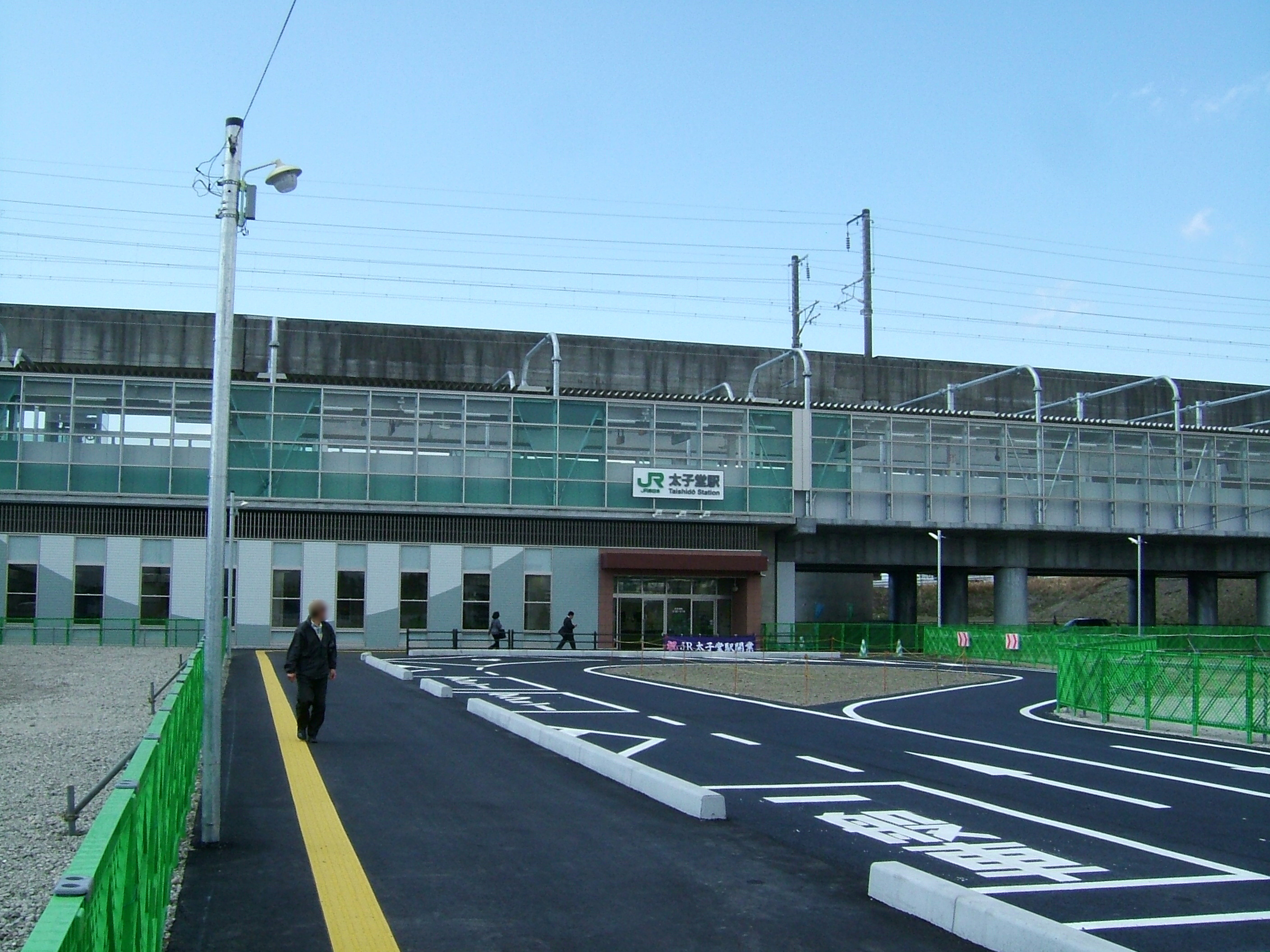
- Taishidō Station, June 2010

General information
- Location: 1-1 Taishidō, Taihaku-ku, Sendai-shi, Miyagi-ken 982-0013; Japan
- Coordinates: 38°13′4.71″N 140°53′0.65″E
- Operator: JR East; Sendai Airport Transit
- Line: Tōhoku Main Line
- Distance: 347.3 km from Tokyo
- Platforms: 1 island platform
- Tracks: 2

Other information
- Status: Staffed (Midori no Madoguchi)
- Website: Official website

History
- Opened: March 18, 2007

Passengers
- FY2018: 3,936 daily

Services
Preceding station	JR East	Following station
Minami-Sendai towards Kuroiso	Tōhoku Main Line Local	Nagamachi towards Morioka
Minami-Sendai towards Shinagawa	Jōban Line Local-Futsuu	Nagamachi towards Sendai
Preceding station	Sendai Airport Transit	Following station
Minami-Sendai towards Sendai Airport	Sendai Airport Line	Nagamachi towards Sendai
Location
- Location within Miyagi Prefecture Location within Japan

Taishidō Station (太子堂駅, Taishidō-eki) is a junction railway station in Taihaku-ku, Sendai, Miyagi Prefecture, Japan, operated by East Japan Railway Company (JR East).

== Lines ==
Taishidō Station is served by JR East's Jōban Line and Tōhoku Main Line. The Sendai Airport Access Line also shares the same track but passes through the station without stopping. The station is 347.3 rail kilometers from the terminus of the Tōhoku Main Line at Tokyo.

== Station layout ==
The station has one elevated island platform which can serve a nine-car train on each side of the platform. The station has a Midori no Madoguchi staffed ticket office.

=== Platforms ===
1	■ Tōhoku Main Line	for Sendai, Rifu, Matsushima, and Kogota
2	■ Tōhoku Main Line	for Shiroishi, and Fukushima
	■ Joban Line	for Iwanuma, and Haranomachi

== History ==
The redevelopment of the area surrounding the station, a site of former railway yard, is being carried out by the Urban Renaissance Agency under the project name "Asuto Nagamachi" (あすと長町). As one of infrastructures of the new town, the new station opened on March 18, 2007.

== Passenger statistics ==
In fiscal 2018, the station was used by an average of 3,936 passengers daily (boarding passengers only).

== Surrounding area ==
- National Route 4
- Natori River

== See also ==
- List of railway stations in Japan
