= Wakabayashi-ku =

Wakabayashi 若林区
- Ward
- Wakabayashi Ward
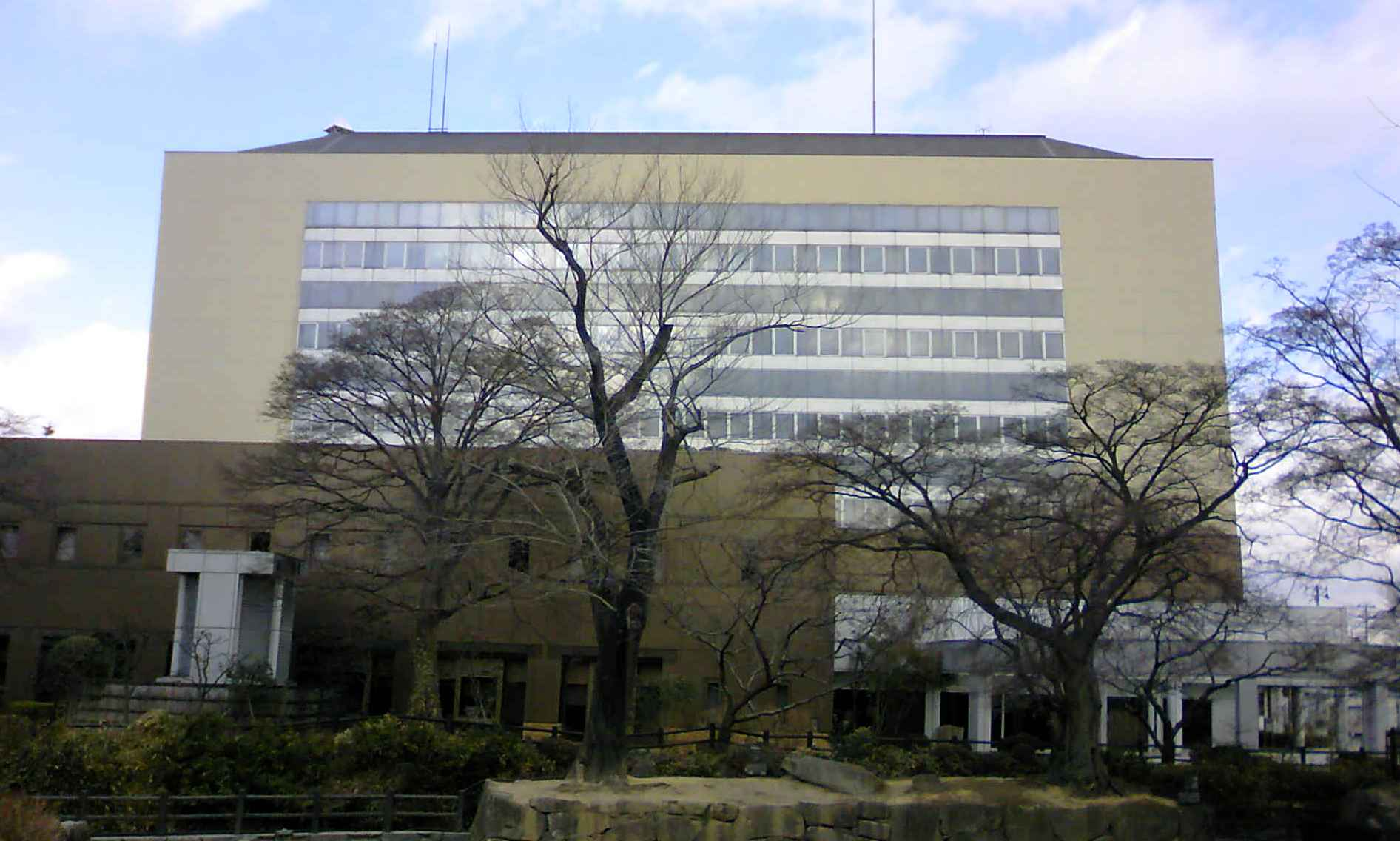
- Wakabayashi Ward Office

- Flag

- Location of Wakabayashi-ku in Sendai

- Coordinates: 38°14′39″N 140°54′3″E
- Country: Japan
- Region: Tōhoku
- Prefecture: Miyagi
- City: Sendai

Area
  - Total: 50.86 km^{2} (19.64 sq mi)

Population (October 1, 2018)
  - Total: 137,494
  - Density: 2,703/km^{2} (7,002/sq mi)
- Time zone: UTC+09:00 (Japan Standard Time)
- Symbols
- Phone number: 022-282-1111
- Address: 3-1 Shuninmae-cho, Wakabayashi-ku, Sendai-shi, Miyagi-ken 981-3189
- Website: Official website (in Japanese)

Wakabayashi-ku (若林区) is the eastern ward of the city Sendai, in Miyagi Prefecture, Japan. As of 1 June 2019, the ward had a population of 138,102 and a population density of 2715 persons per km² in 63583 households. The total area of the ward was 50.86 square kilometres (19.64 sq mi).

== Geography ==
Wakabayashi-ku is located on the coast, bordered by Sendai Bay on the Pacific Ocean to the east, and by the city of Natori separated by the Natori River to the south.

=== Neighboring municipalities ===
- Miyagi Prefecture
  - Aoba-ku, Sendai
  - Miyagino-ku, Sendai
  - Taihaku-ku, Sendai
  - Natori

== History ==
The area of present-day Wakabayashi-ku was part of ancient Mutsu Province, and has been settled since at least the Japanese Paleolithic period. The area was inhabited by the Emishi people, and numerous kofun burial mounds from the Kofun period have been found. The area came under the control of the imperial dynasty during the late Nara period from their base at Tagajō. During the Heian period, the Mutsu Kokubun-ji provincial temple was located in the area. The area was later controlled by the Northern Fujiwara clan of Hiraizumi. During the Sengoku period, the area was dominated by various samurai clans before coming under the control of the Date clan during the Edo period, who ruled Sendai Domain under the Tokugawa shogunate. With the April 1, 1889 establishment of the post-Meiji restoration municipalities system, the area was divided between Natori District and Miyagi District of Miyagi Prefecture. The area was annexed by the city of Sendai in 1989. In the aftermath of the 2011 Tōhoku earthquake and tsunami, the area was severely damaged, especially in Arahama district, where almost all 2,700 houses were destroyed and swept away by tsunamis.

== Education ==
Wakabayashi-ku has 12 public elementary schools and six public junior high schools operated by the city government, and one public junior school operated by the Miyagi Prefectural Board of Education. There are two private elementary schools. The ward also has two public high schools operated by the Miyagi Prefectural Board of Education. The city also operates one combined middle/junior high school.

== Transportation ==
=== Railway ===
- Sendai Subway - Namboku Line
  - Atagobashi - Kawaramachi
- Sendai Subway - Tōzai Line
  - Rembo - Yakushidō - Oroshimachi - Rokuchonome - Arai

=== Highway ===
- Sendai-Tōbu Road
- Sendai-Nanbu Road
- National Route 4

== National historic sites ==
- Tōmizuka Kofun
- Mutsu Kokubun-ji
