= Ibex Airlines =

Regional airline of Japan

Ibex Airlines Co., Ltd. アイベックスエアラインズ株式会社 Aibekkusu Earainzu Kabushiki-gaisha

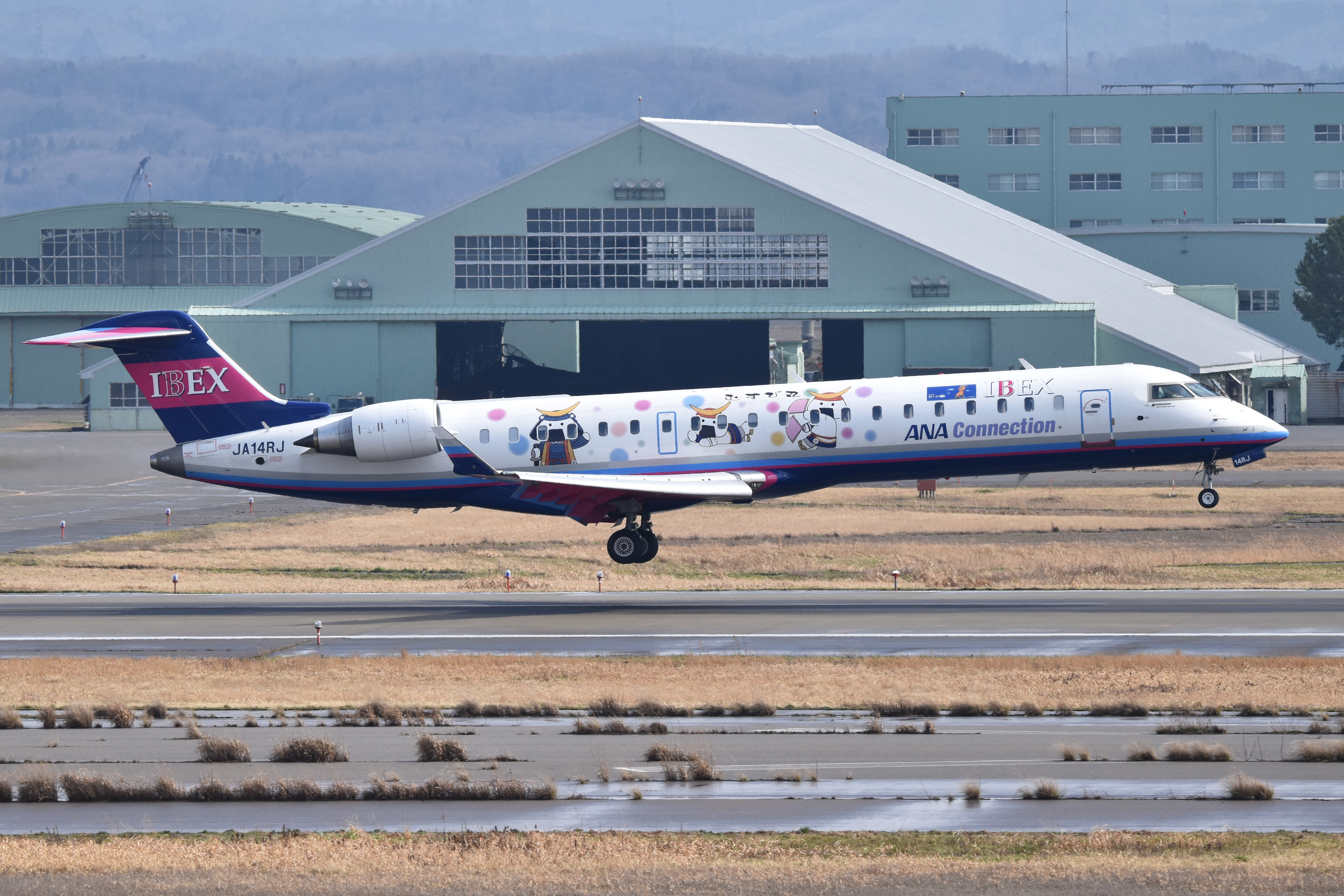
- Ibex Airlines CRJ-700 at Komatsu Airport
IATA	ICAO	Call sign
FW	IBX	IBEX
- Founded: January 29, 1999; 27 years ago (as Fair)
- Commenced operations: August 7, 2000; 26 years ago (as Fair); October 1, 2004; 21 years ago (as Ibex Airlines)
- Operating bases: Nagoya–Centrair; Sendai
- Fleet size: 9
- Destinations: 12
- Headquarters: Sendai, Miyagi, Japan
- Key people: Takao Asai (President)
- Website: www.ibexair.co.jp

Ibex Airlines is a Japanese regional airline headquartered in Sendai, Miyagi Prefecture. It operates Japanese domestic services with its main base at Sendai Airport, Natori, Miyagi.

== History ==
The airline was established on 29 January 1999 and started operations on 7 August 2000 between Sendai and Osaka's (Itami Airport) under the name of Fair Inc. It reached a co-operation agreement with All Nippon Airways under which it is provided assistance in capacities including flight operations, flight crew provision, maintenance and engineering services. The airline began service to Tokyo's Narita International Airport in April 2002. In October 2004 the Sendai-based airline changed its name to Ibex Airlines.

== Destinations ==
Ibex Airlines operates scheduled service to the following destinations within Japan (as of November 2024):

City	Island	Airport	Note
Fukuoka	Kyushu	Fukuoka Airport	
Fukushima	Honshu	Fukushima Airport	
Hiroshima	Honshu	Hiroshima Airport	
Kagoshima	Kyushu	Kagoshima Airport	
Nagoya	Honshu	Chubu Centrair International Airport	Base
Niigata	Honshu	Niigata Airport	
Ōita	Kyushu	Oita Airport	
Osaka	Honshu	Itami Airport	
Sapporo	Hokkaido	New Chitose Airport	
Sendai	Honshu	Sendai Airport	Base

=== Codeshare agreements ===
Ibex Airlines has a codeshare agreement with All Nippon Airways

== Fleet ==
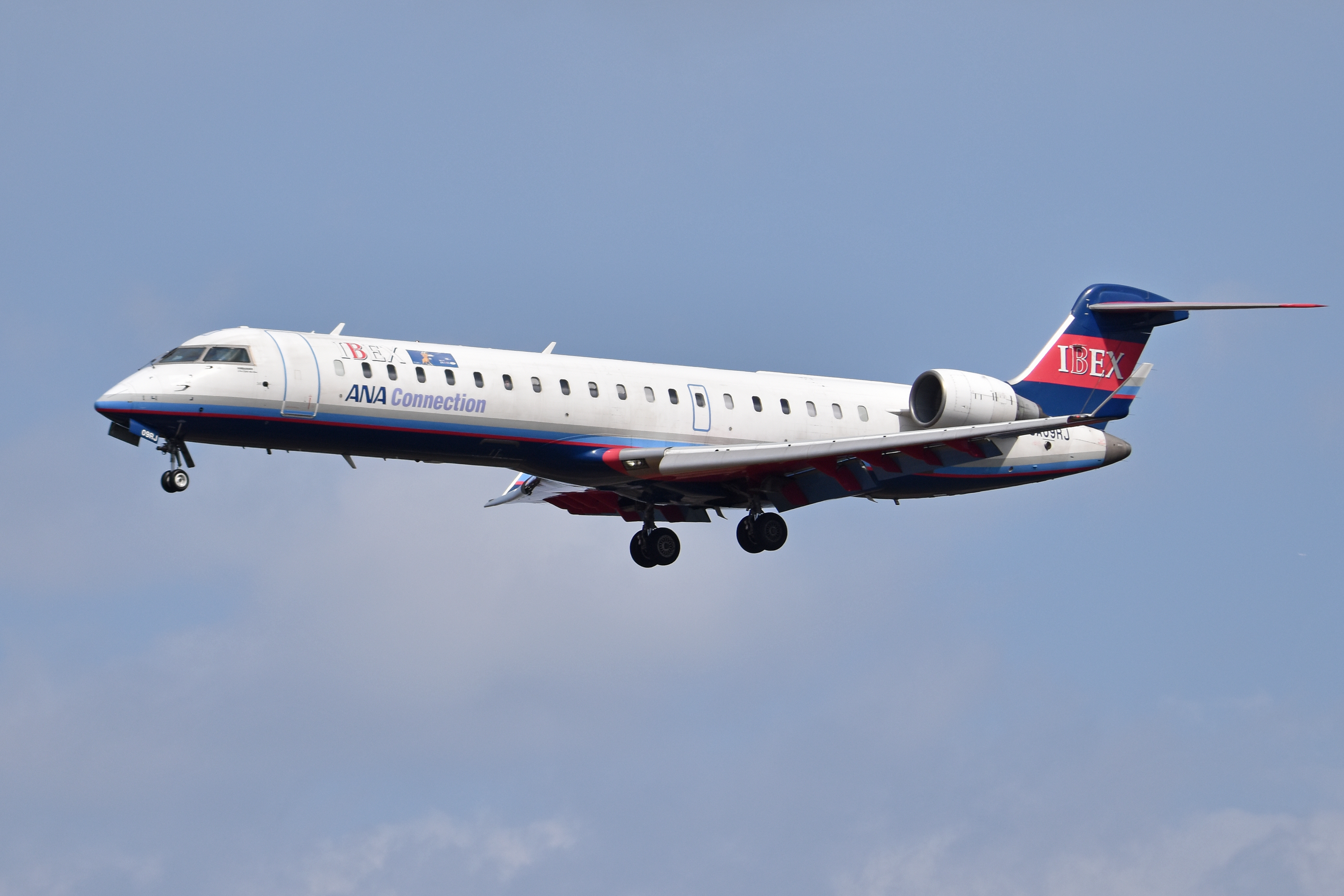
Ibex Airlines Bombardier CRJ700

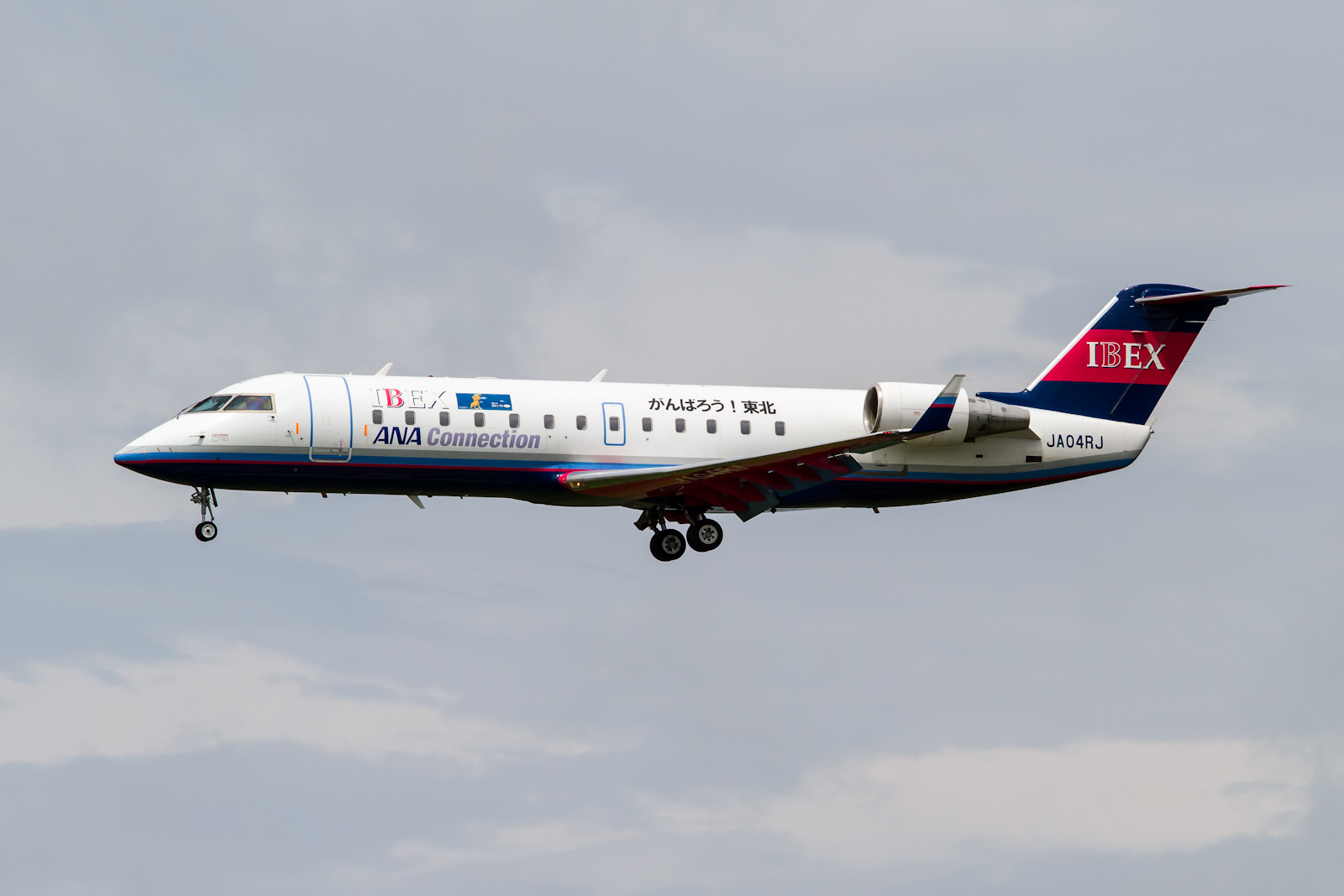
A former Ibex Airlines Bombardier CRJ100 (2012).

=== Current fleet ===
As of July 2026, Ibex Airlines operates the following aircraft:

Ibex Airlines fleet
Aircraft	In fleet	Orders	Passengers	Notes
Bombardier CRJ700	9	—	70	
Embraer 190-E2	—	8	TBA	Deliverlies from 2029.
Total	9	8		
