= Iinozaka Kofun Cluster =

- 飯野坂古墳群 (Japanese)
- Iinozaka Kofun Cluster Iinozaka Kofun Cluster (Japan)
- 38°09′44″N 140°52′38″E
- Periods: Kofun period
- Location: Natori, Miyagi, Japan
- Region: Tōhoku region

Site notes
- Public access: Yes (no facilities)

Iinozaka kofun group (飯野坂古墳群, Iinozaka kofun-gun) is cluster of Kofun period tumuli located in what is now the city of Natori, Miyagi Prefecture in the Tōhoku region of northern Japan. The presence of an unusual number of large keyhole-shaped kofun located so close together drew attention, and the site received protection by the central government as a National Historic Site in 1976.

== Overview ==
The site is located on the northern side of 30-meter high hill located approximately 2 kilometers south of Natori Station in the Natori Plains. The site consists of five large "two conjoined rectangle" type (zenpō-kōhō-fun (前方後方墳)), and two square (hōfun (方墳))-style kofun:

Zenpō-kōhō-fun

- Kannonzuka kofun (観音塚古墳), length 63 meters; rear portion: 30 meters wide, 6 meters high, front portion: 23 meters wide, 5 meters high
- Miyayama kofun (宮山古墳), length 70 meters; rear portion: 35 meters wide, 5.5 meters high, front portion: 25 meters wide, 3.5 meters high
- Yakushido kofun (薬師堂古墳), total length 68 meters; rear portion: 35 meters wide, 6.4 meters high, front portion: 21 meters wide, 3.6 meters high
- Yamakyo kofun (山居古墳), length 60 meters; rear portion: 30 meters wide, 5.3 meters high, front portion: 30 meters wide, 3.5 meters high
- Yamakyo-kita kofun (山居北古墳), length 42 meter; rear portion: 20 meters wide, 3 meters high, front portion: 12 meters wide, 1.3 meters high

hōfun

- Kannonzuka-kita No.1, 14 meters x 14 meters
- Kannonzuka-kita No.2, 14 meters x 14 meters

The site was surveyed by the Natori Board of Education in 1975 and 1976, although no excavations have been conducted. From the shape and construction of the mounds and from pot-shaped haniwa which have been recovered, the tombs are believed to date from the 4th century AD. The site was endangered by the expansion of nearby housing developments in the early 1970s., but the presence of so many Zenpō-kōhō-fun in one location is unique, and the site received protection as a National Historic Site,

It is about a 20-minute walk from Natori Station on the JR East Tōhoku Main Line. Although the site is open to the public, there are no facilities and some of the kofun are covered with trees and dense undergrowth.

== See also ==
- List of Historic Sites of Japan (Miyagi)
- Raijinyama Kofun
