= Raijinyama Kofun =

Kofun burial mound in Natori, Japan

- 雷神山古墳 (Japanese)
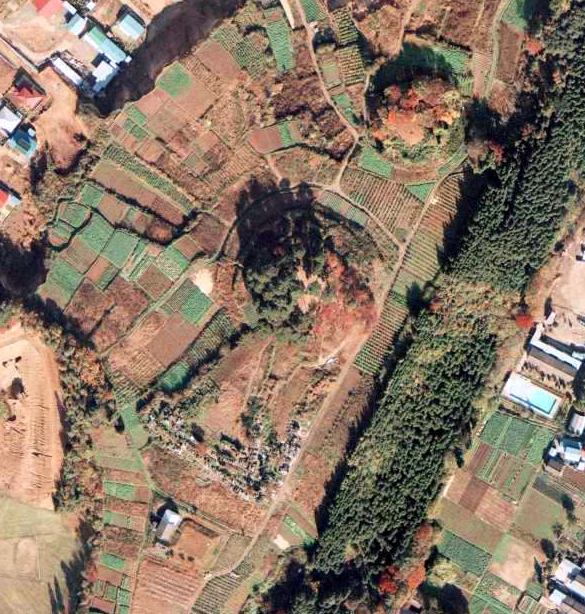
- Raijinyama Kofun

- Raijinyama Kofun Raijinyama Kofun (Japan)
- 38°09′3.2″N 140°52′46″E
- Type: kofun
- Periods: Kofun period
- Location: Natori, Miyagi, Japan
- Region: Tōhoku region

History
- Built: late 4th or early 5th century AD

Site notes
- Length: 168 m (551 ft)
- Excavation dates: 1976-1977
- Public access: Yes

Raijinyama Kofun (雷神山古墳) is a kofun burial mound located approximately two kilometers south of the center of the city of Natori, Miyagi in the Tōhoku region of northern Japan. The site is a double mound, consisting of a large keyhole-shaped kofun with a smaller adjacent circular kofun. Both were collectively designated a National Historic Site in 1956, with the area covered by the designation expanded in 1968.

== Overview ==
The Raijinyama kofun is the largest keyhole-shaped kofun (前方後円墳, zenpō-kōen-fun) in the Tōhoku region and is located at the top of Natori hill where many large tumuli are concentrated, overlooking the Sendai Plain. It has a total length of 168 meters, and was once partially surrounded by a moat. It was built in steps, partially by utilizing the contours of a natural hill, and was once covered in fukiishi. A portion of the posterior tumulus collapsed during the 2011 Tōhoku earthquake, suggesting that it contained a clay coffin or wooden coffin in a burial chamber.

North of the main kofun is a smaller domed tumulus with a diameter of 54 meters called the "Kozuka kofun".

The tomb does not appear in any historical records and the name of rank of the person buried within is unknown. It has only been partially excavated; however, From the style of the mound and the pot-shaped haniwa and Sue ware pottery fragments discovered at the site, archaeologists have dated the kofun to the late 4th or early 5th century AD.

At present, the area is being maintained as a historic park. It is about a 30-minute walk from Tatekoshi Station on the JR East Tōhoku Main Line.

Raijinyama kofun

- Total length: 168 meters
- Circular Portion: 3-stages, 96 meter diameter x 12 meter height
- Keyway Portion: 72 meter length x 96 meter max width, 6 meter height, 2-stage

Kozuka kofun

- Circular Portion: 3-stages, 54 meter diameter

== See also ==
- List of Historic Sites of Japan (Miyagi)
- Tōmizuka Kofun
- Iinozaka Kofun Cluster
