= Tatekoshi Station =

Railway station in Natori, Miyagi Prefecture, Japan

Tatekoshi Station 館腰駅
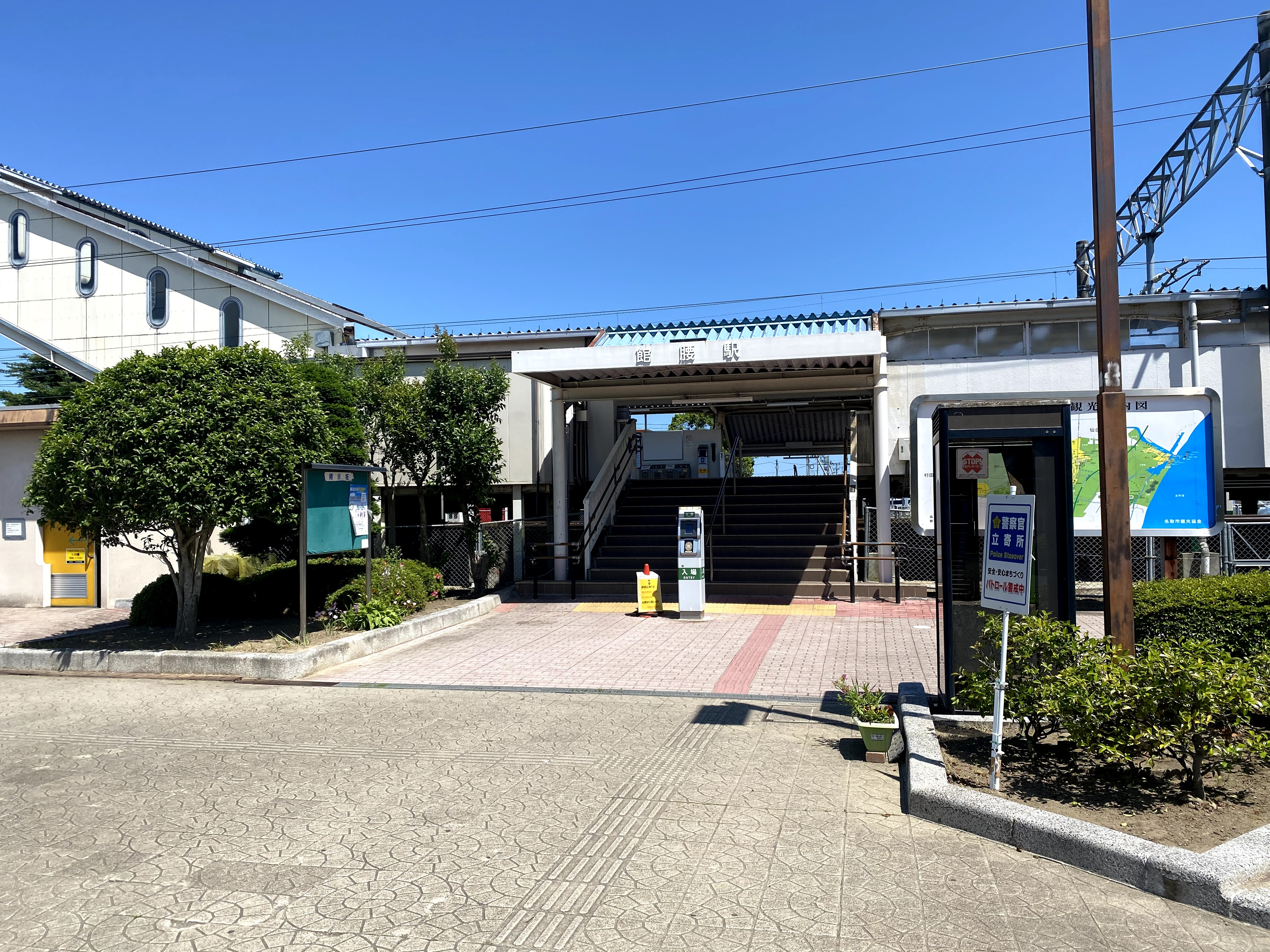
- West Exit in May, 2021

General information
- Location: 4-18-11 Uematsu, Natori-shi, Miyagi-ken 981-1226; Japan
- Coordinates: 38.1431975°N 140.8802605°E
- Operator: JR East
- Line: ■ Tōhoku Main Line
- Distance: 337.9 km from Tokyo
- Platforms: 2 side platforms
- Tracks: 2

Other information
- Status: Staffed
- Website: Official website

History
- Opened: July 25, 1932

Passengers
- FY2018: 2350 daily

Services
Preceding station	JR East	Following station
Iwanuma towards Kuroiso	Tōhoku Main Line Local	Natori towards Morioka
Iwanuma towards Shinagawa	Jōban Line Local-Futsuu	Natori towards Sendai
Location
- Location within Miyagi Prefecture Location within Japan

Tatekoshi Station (館腰駅, Tatekoshi-eki) is a railway station in the city of Natori, Miyagi Prefecture, Japan, operated by East Japan Railway Company (JR East). Until the introduction of the Sendai Airport Access Line, it was the most direct point of access to Sendai Airport by a connecting bus service. The bus service still operates.

== Lines ==
Tatekoshi Station is served by the Tōhoku Main Line, and is located 337.9 rail kilometers from the official starting point of the line at Tokyo. It is also served by the Joban Line, whose trains run past the official terminus at Iwanuma Station on to Sendai.

== Station layout ==
The station has two opposed side platforms connected to the station building by a footbridge. The station is staffed.

=== Platforms ===
1	■ Tōhoku Main Line	for Sendai, Matsushima, Kogota
2	■ Tōhoku Main Line	for Iwanuma,Shiroishi and Fukushima
	■ Joban Line	for Iwanuma,Watari and Haranomachi

== History ==
Tatekoshi Station opened on April 22, 1985. The station was absorbed into the JR East network upon the privatization of the Japanese National Railways (JNR) on April 1, 1987.

== Passenger statistics ==
In fiscal 2018, the station was used by an average of 2,350 passengers daily (boarding passengers only).

== Surrounding area ==
- Tatekoshi Post Office
- Tatekoshi Shrine
- Sendai Airport

== See also ==
- List of railway stations in Japan
