= Sendai Airport =

International airport in Miyagi Prefecture, Japan

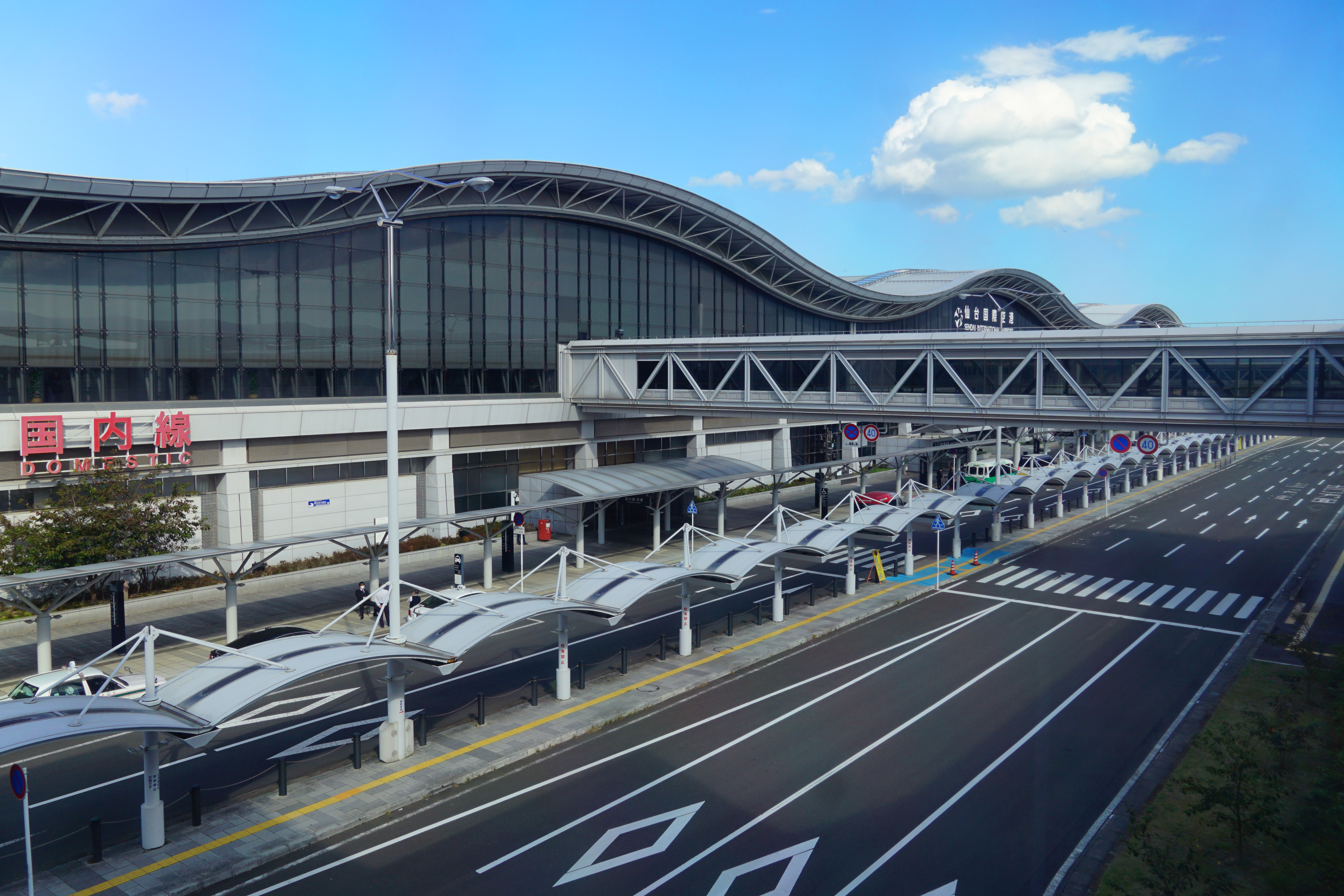
- IATA: SDJ; ICAO: RJSS

Summary
- Airport type: Public
- Operator: Sendai International Airport Co., Ltd.
- Serves: Sendai
- Location: Natori, Miyagi
- Hub for: Ibex Airlines
- Elevation AMSL: 6 ft (1.8 m)
- Coordinates: 38°08′23″N 140°55′01″E
- Website: sendai-airport.co.jp

Map
- Location in Miyagi Prefecture SDJ/RJSS (Japan)

Runways
Direction	Length		Surface
Direction	m	ft	Surface
09/27	3,000	9,843	Asphalt concrete
12/30	1,200	3,937	Asphalt concrete

Statistics (2024)
- Passengers: 3,778,423 ▲6.4%
- Cargo (metric tonnes): 2,785 ▲2.3%
- Aircraft movement: 28,400
- Source: Japanese The Asahi Shimbun

Sendai Airport (仙台空港, Sendai Kūkō) (IATA: SDJ, ICAO: RJSS) is an international airport located in Natori of Miyagi Prefecture, 13.6 km (8.5 mi) south-southeast of Sendai, Japan. The airport is the largest in Tōhoku region. The airport's annual passenger numbers have been around 3.6 million in recent years, competing with Kobe Airport for 10th place in Japan. The airport sustained serious damage in 2011 Tōhoku earthquake and tsunami.

Ibex Airlines, a regional airline, is based at the airport.

== History ==
In 1940, the Imperial Japanese Army built Sendai Airport in order to use it for the Kumagaya Army Flight School, Masda Branch School Trainee Training Center. It was called by several names: Natory Airfield, Masda Airfield, and Yatory Airfield. In 1943, the Miho Army Flight Center moved into Sendai Airport and facilities were expanded and later reformed into the Sendai Army Flight School.

At the end of World War II, the United States Army took control of the airport and its operations. In 1956, it was returned to Japan and transferred to the Ministry of Defense. The Ministry of Transport was designated to administer and use it.

In 1957, the runway was extended to 1,200 metres (3,937 ft) and Nippon Helicopter Transport (now All Nippon Airways) established a route from Tokyo's (Haneda Airport) to Sendai. When the airport began to service commercial jets on 14 February 1970, runway 09/27 was extended to 2,000 metres (6,562 ft). Also, the flight school of Japan Ground Self Defense Force moved into North Utsunomiya Army Post.

Beginning 6 April 1990, Asiana Airlines established a route from Seoul (Gimpo International Airport) to Sendai, thus beginning international service from the airport. Air China began scheduled service to Beijing via Dalian in 1994, which was followed by services to Shanghai and Changchun.

In 1992, Runway 09/27 was extended further to 2,500 metres (8,202 ft) and 5 years later, in 1997, a new terminal was opened and the runway was extended further to 3,000 metres (9,843 ft).

Due to the 1997 Asian Financial Crisis, Singapore Airlines suspended services in Sendai.

The Sendai Airport Line rail link was completed on 18 March 2007 and began service between Sendai and Sendai Airport Station. The "Smile Terrace" observation deck opened on 19 March 2010.

=== 2011 Tōhoku earthquake, tsunami and aftermath ===
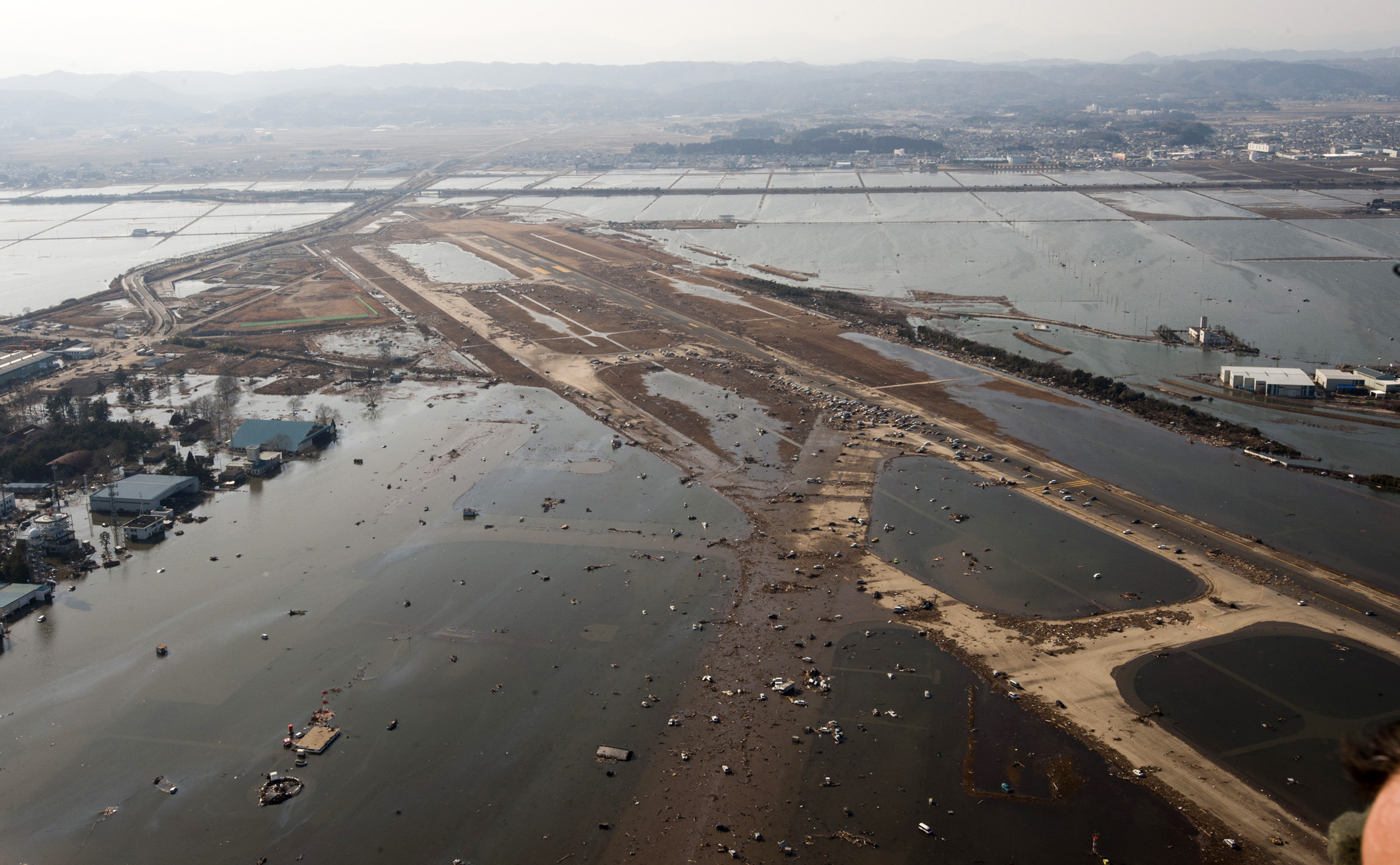
Tsunami flooding around the airport

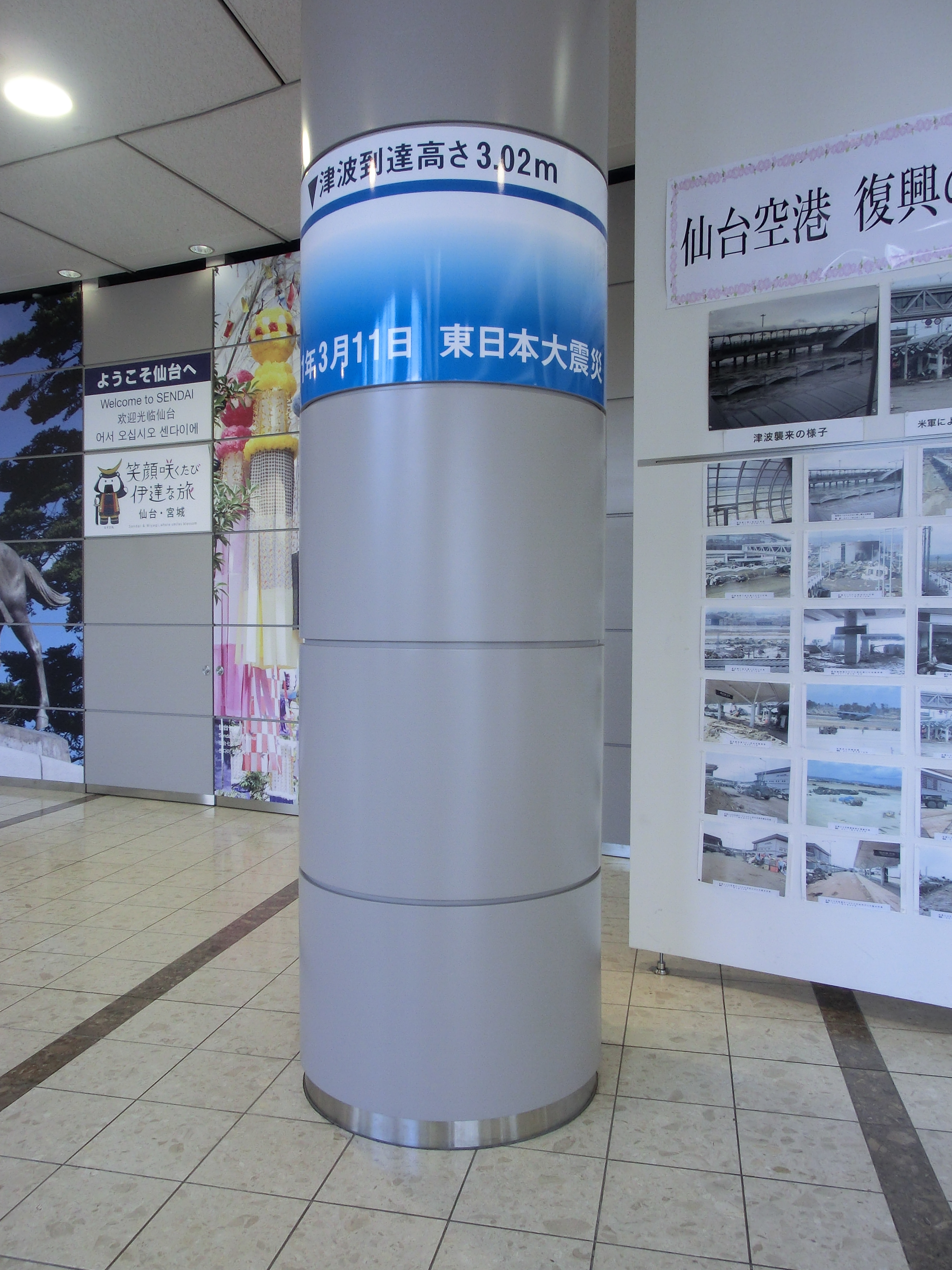
A pillar on the terminal building's first floor denoting the maximum height flood waters from the 2011 Tōhoku earthquake and tsunami reached, 3.02 metres

On 11 March 2011, the airport was damaged by the 2011 Tōhoku earthquake and then substantially flooded by the subsequent tsunami. In addition to submerging the apron, taxiways and runway, the floodwaters reached up to parts of the 2nd level of the passenger terminal, rendering electrical equipment, transformers and safety equipment inoperable. Operations at Sendai as well as Odate-Noshiro Airport and Sado Airport, which had been controlled by Sendai Airport control tower, were suspended. Some 1,300 people were stranded within the terminal until 13 March 2011, when they were evacuated. By 17 March 2011, military engineers partially opened the airport for tsunami response flights.

To reopen the airport, on 16 March 2011, a U.S. Air Force MC-130P Combat Shadow from the 17th Special Operations Squadron infiltrated a team from the 320th Special Tactics Squadron from Kadena Air Base into Matsushima, Miyagi, then moved overland to the airport. With assistance from Japan Self-Defense Forces, enough debris was removed in a few days to allow an MC-130H Combat Talon II aircraft to begin landing with more equipment, personnel, and supplies. After further cleanup with help from additional US and Japanese military units, on 20 March 2011, a US Air Force C-17 landed at the airport with 40 metric tons of relief supplies. Thereafter, the airport served as a transit location for airlifted supplies, totaling approximately 2 million tons of such items as blankets, water, and food. The US military set up and operated air traffic control operations for the airport until shortly before commercial traffic resumed, at which point air traffic control responsibility was resumed by Japanese controllers.

The airport reopened to limited commercial traffic on 13 April 2011. Japan Airlines and ANA conducted a total of six flights a day to Tokyo Haneda Airport upon resumption of services, with Japan Airlines also offering limited flights to Osaka Itami airport.

Due to damage caused by the earthquake and tsunami, all scheduled service (except for humanitarian flights) were suspended from 11 March 2011 until 13 April 2011. Limited services resumed on 13 April 2011, although not all original Sendai destinations were served. Regular domestic flights resumed on 25 July 2011 and most international flights resumed shortly after the airport's railway station reopened in October 2011. Although most international services from Sendai came back online following the 2011 disaster, most services between Sendai and China were suspended or cancelled between 2012 and 2013 due to worsened Sino-Japanese relations. Asiana Airlines also reduced the frequency of its Sendai-Seoul service in September 2013. Despite the reduction in China and Korea service, 2013 saw new service from Sendai to Bangkok and Honolulu as well as new charter service to Taipei. The global COVID-19 pandemic also resulted in greatly reduced passenger traffic.

== Facilities ==
The main passenger terminal building was designed by Japanese American architect Gyo Obata, of the St. Louis architecture firm Hellmuth, Obata & Kassabaum.

There are four floors in the terminal:

- G1: arrivals area (domestic and international), baggage claim, customs, central Plaza – G1
- M2 – arrivals concourse, atrium, customs control area
- 2 – departure area (domestic and international), airline offices, check-in counters, lounges and waiting area.
- 3 – retail shops (4), business lounge, waiting area and access to observation deck

The airport has eight jet bridges to handle aircraft coming and leaving the airport. The west end of the terminal services domestic routes and the east side international routes. The control tower, Tokyo Regional Civil Aviation Bureau office and Air Cargo Terminal are located on the west side of the main terminal building. To the south side of the airport are the facilities for small private aircraft, helipads (4) and aircraft hangars.

== Airlines and destinations ==
Airlines	Destinations
Air Do	Sapporo–Chitose
All Nippon Airways	Naha, Osaka–Itami
ANA Wings	Nagoya–Centrair, Osaka–Itami, Sapporo–Chitose
Asiana Airlines	Seoul–Incheon
EVA Air	Taipei–Taoyuan
Fuji Dream Airlines	Fukuoka
Greater Bay Airlines	Seasonal : Hong Kong
HK Express	Hong Kong
Ibex Airlines	Fukuoka, Hiroshima, Nagoya–Centrair, Osaka–Itami, Sapporo–Chitose
J-Air	Osaka–Itami, Sapporo–Chitose
Jeju Air	Seoul–Incheon (begins 8 January 2027)
Peach	Nagoya–Centrair, Osaka–Kansai, Sapporo–Chitose
Skymark Airlines	Kobe
StarFlyer	Fukuoka
Starlux Airlines	Taipei–Taoyuan
Tigerair Taiwan	Kaohsiung, Taipei–Taoyuan

== Ground transportation ==
The Sendai Airport Line, which connects the airport to Sendai Station, opened on 18 March 2007. The journey to the downtown core of the city takes 17–25 minutes. After the earthquake and tsunami, service was suspended until 1 October of that year.

The airport can be accessed by car via the Sendai–Tōbu Road via Route 20. There are two car parks located near the terminal building (Parking 1 with 970 spots) and east side of the airport property (Parking 2 with 250 spots).

Buses and taxis also service the airport and are located outside the Domestic Terminal:

=== Route and highway buses ===
Bus stop	Name	Via	Destination	Company	Note
1	Sendai-Kūkō-Yamagata Line	Yamagata Kencho-mae	Yamagata Station	Miyagi kōtsū・YamaKō bus	
1	Tsuruoka・Sakata Line	Sendai Station・Sagae Station・Kisakata Station	Ugo-Honjo Station	Shonaikotsu	
1	Sendai -kūkō ー Fukushima ー Aizu-Wakamatsu Line	Sōma Station・Fukushima Station・Nihonmatsu Station	Aizu-Wakamatsu Station	Aizu bus	
1	Sendai-kūkō -Zao Line	Non stop	Zaō Onsen	Sendai bus	Runs only during winter
2	Matsushima Line	Matsushima-Kaigan Station	Matsushima Station	Iwamate-Kenpoku-Jidosya	
2	Sendai Airport Limousine	Non stop	Sendai Station	Takeyakoutu ・Sendai bus	
3	KūKō Line	circular-route	Iwanuma Station	Iwanumashi Community bus	
3	Rinku-Jyunkan bus	circular-route	Tatekoshi Station	Sendai bus	

- Taxis – Sendai City and Tatekoshi JR Station

== Accidents and incidents ==
- In 1963, All Nippon Airways Flight 802 missed its approach and crashed at the airport, but there were no fatalities.
