= Natori District, Miyagi =

Former district in Miyagi prefecture, Japan

Natori District (Japanese: 名取郡, Hepburn: Natori-gun) was a district located in Rikuzen Province (formerly in the central part of Mutsu Province) in Miyagi Prefecture.

== History ==
=== From Ancient Establishment to Pre-modern Alignment (7C - 19C) ===
Many kofuns had been built in the area of the future Natori district since the 5th century. Especially Raijinyama Kofun was the largest in the Tōhoku region of Honshu.

The district was founded in the 7th century. Kōriyama Site had been the capital of Mutsu province since the end of the 7th century until 724.

Natori Dan (Natori Battalion) had been long maintained as one of two, six or seven battalions of the province.

Heijō-kyō excavation team discovered a wood tag attaching kombu (sea grass) tribute in 729 from "Natori district of Mutsu province" to the palace. And although date and year are unknown, a word Notori was written on a cup excavated at the Kōriyama Site. The first appearance in reliable literature is in Shoku Nihongi when Kimikobe Okina, a person of Natori District, was permitted to change his family name (kabane) in 769.

Northern border with Miyagi District changed several times. Originally Natori River and its branch Hirose River were the border of their east side. Sendai Domain fixed the district borders in the end of the 16th century or the beginning of the 17th century. Then the boundary around Sendai are changed to Tatsunokuchi River, where is a small branch of the Hirose. This arrangement gave the Sendai Castle to the Miyagi district. Natori district was divided to 61 villages. The Nagamachi office (Nagamachi daikansho) administrated 31 villages of Northern (Kitakata, 北方) Natori and the Masuda office did 30 villages of Southern (Minamikata, 南方) Natori.

=== Start of the Municipal Law System (1886) ===
When Municipal Law was enforced to Natori on April 1 of 1889, 1 town and 14 villages' municipalities were established from 61 old villages.

- The town of Iwanuma (岩沼) from Iwanuma-Hongō(岩沼本郷).
- The village of Masuda (増田) from Masuda, Takō (田高), Tekurada (手倉田) and 下余田 (Shimo-yōden).
- The village of Mogasaki (茂ヶ崎) from Nagamachi (長町) and Kōriyama (郡山).
- The village of Rokugō (六郷) from Iida (飯田), Imaizumi (今泉), Okino (沖野), Tanetsugi (種次), Nippe (日辺), Futagi (二木), Ido-hama (井戸浜) and Fujizuka-hama (藤塚浜).
- The village of Higashi-taga (東多賀) from Yuriage (閖上), Ushino (牛野),Ō magari (大曲), Kotsukahara (小塚原), Takayanagi (高柳).
- The village of Shimo-masuda (下増田) from Shimo-masuda and Sugigafukuro (杉ヶ袋).
- The village of Tatekoshi (館腰) from Uematsu (植松), Iinozaka (飯野坂), Horiuchi (堀内) and Hongō (本郷).
- The village of Tamaura (玉浦) from Shimonogō (下野郷), Oshiwake (押分), Hayamata (早股) and Terashima (寺島).
- The village of Sengan (千貫) from Kita-hase (北長谷), Minami-hase (南長谷), Ogawa (小川), Shiga (志賀), Nagaoka (長岡) and Miiroyoshi (三色吉).
- The village of Medeshima (愛島) from Kitame (北目), Shiote (塩手), Kasashima (笠島) and Azukishima (小豆島).
- The village of Takadate (高館) from Yoshida (吉田), Kawakami (川上) and Kumanodō (熊野堂).
- The village of Nakada (中田) from Maeda (前田), Shirōmaru (四郎丸), Fukurohara (袋原) and Yanagiu (柳生).
- The village of Nishi-taga (西多賀) from Tomizawa (富沢), Ōnoda (大野田), Kagitori (鉤取), Tomita (富田) and Yamada (山田).
- The village of Oide (生出) from Moniwa (茂庭) and Tsubonuma (坪沼).
- The village of Akiu (秋保) from Nagafukuro (長袋), Sakaino (境野), Baba (馬場), Yumoto (湯元) and Nikkawa (新川).

=== Merging History to Dissolve (1886 - 1988) ===
Japanese district exclude city status municipality. So the Natori district had gradually diminished with incorporation or promotion of its municipalities to cities. Finally the original area had been divided to three cities of Sendai, Natori and Iwanuma by 1988.

- June 30, 1896 The village of Masuda gained town status. (2 towns and 13 villages)
- February 1, 1915 The village of Mogasaki gained town status and renamed to Nagamachi (長町). (3 towns and 12 village)
- April 1, 1928 The town of Nagamachi merged into the city of Sendai. The village of Higashi-taga gained town status and renamed to the town of Yuriage. (3 towns, 11 villages)
- October 1, 1932 The village of Nishi-taga merged into the city of Sendai. (3 towns, 10 villages)
- September 15, 1941 the villages of Nakada and Rokugo merged into the city of Sendai. (3 towns and 8 villages)
- April 1, 1955
- The towns of Masuda and Yuriage, and the villages of Shimomasuda, Tatekoshi, Takadate, and Aishiwa merged to form the town of Natori. (2 towns, 4 villages)
- The town of Iwanuma and the villages of Sengan(千貫村), and Tamaura(玉浦村) merged to become the town of Iwanuma.(2 towns, 2 villages)
- Nikkawa, a part of the village of Akiu merged into the village of Miyagi.
- April 1, 1956 The village of Oide merged into the city of Sendai. (2 towns and 1 village)
- 1958 The town of Natori granted city status to become the city of Natori.(1 town, 1 village)
- April 1, 1967 The village of Akiu granted town status to become the town of Akiu.(2 towns)
- 1971 The town of Iwanuma granted city status to become the city of Iwanuma.(1 town)
- March 1, 1988 The town of Akiu merged into the city of Sendai and Natori District dissolved.

=== Table of Merging ===
1889	April 1, 1889	1889 - 1926	1926 - 1955		1955 - 1989		1989 -	present
	Mogasaki	February 1, 1915 renamad town Nagamachi	April 1, 1928 merged to Sendai		Sendai	Sendai	Sendai	Sendai
	Nishi-taga	Nishi-taga	October 1, 1932 merged to Sendai		Sendai	Sendai	Sendai	Sendai
	Nakada	Nakada	September 15, 1941 merged to Sendai		Sendai	Sendai	Sendai	Sendai
	Rokugō	Rokugō	September 15, 1941 merged to Sendai		Sendai	Sendai	Sendai	Sendai
	Oide	Oide	Oide		April 1, 1956 merged to Sendai	Sendai	Sendai	Sendai
	Akiu	Akiu	April 1, 1955; Nikkawa was trsnsferd to Miyagi; Akiu		April 1, 1967 town	March 1, 1988 merged to Sendai	Sendai	Sendai
	Masuda	June 30, 1896 town	Masuda	April 1, 1955; Natori	October 1, 1958 city		Natori	Natori
	Higashi-Taga	Higashi-taga	April 1, 1928 town Yuriage	April 1, 1955; Natori	October 1, 1958 city		Natori	Natori
	Takadate	Takadate	Takadate	April 1, 1955; Natori	October 1, 1958 city		Natori	Natori
	Medeshima	Medeshima	Medeshima	April 1, 1955; Natori	October 1, 1958 city		Natori	Natori
	Tatekoshi	Tatekoshi	Tatekoshi	April 1, 1955; Natori	October 1, 1958 city		Natori	Natori
	Shimo-masuda	Shimo-masuda	Shimo-masuda	April 1, 1955; Natori	October 1, 1958 city		Natori	Natori
	Iwanuma	Iwanuma	January 11, 1947 亘理郡逢隈村の一部を 岩沼町に編入	April 1, 1955; Iwanuma	November 1, 1971 city		Iwanuma	Iwanuma
	Tamaura	Tamaura	Tamaura	April 1, 1955; Iwanuma	November 1, 1971 city		Iwanuma	Iwanuma
	Sengan	Sengan	Sengan	April 1, 1955; Iwanuma	November 1, 1971 city		Iwanuma	Iwanuma

== See also ==
- List of dissolved districts of Japan

== Bibliography ==
- Aoki Kazuo (青木和夫), Inaoka Koji (稲岡耕二), Sasayama Haruo (笹山晴生) and Shirafuji Noriyuki (白藤禮幸) edits, Shoku Nihongi (続日本紀) 4, Shin Nihon Koten Bungaku Taikei, (新日本古典文学大系 New Japan Classic Literature), Iwanami Shoten (岩波書店), 1995.
- Natori-shishi Hensan Iinkai (名取市史編纂委員会, Editing Committee of Natori City History), Natori Shishi (名取市史, Nator City History), Natori City, 1977.
- Nagashima Eiichi (長島榮一), Koriyama Iseki (郡山遺跡, Koriyama Site), Nihon no Iseki 35 (日本の遺跡35, Sites of Japan 35), Doseisha (同成社), 2009.
- Baba "Mutsu-koku Nifuda no `Hakken'" (陸奥国荷札の「発見」Discaver of a sendng plate of Mustu Province)」, Nara Bunkazai Kenkyusho Kiyo (奈良文化財研究所紀要). 2004年.

p24
