= Tōmizuka Kofun =

4th or 5th century Japanese burial mound

Tomizuka Kofun
- 遠見塚古墳 (Japanese)
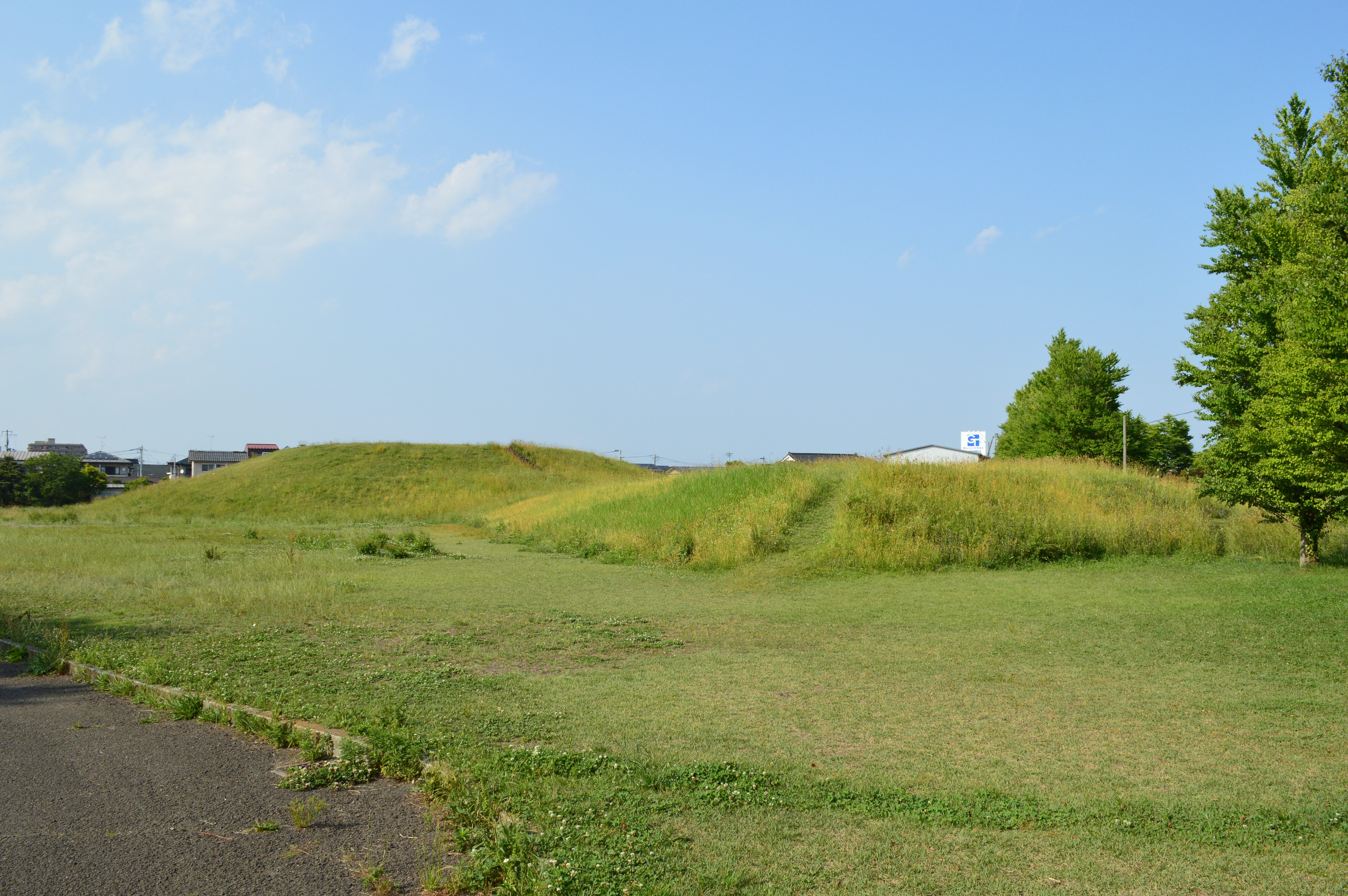
- Tomizuka Kofun

- Tomizuka Kofun Tōmizuka Kofun (Japan)
- 38°14′18″N 140°54′52″E
- Type: kofun
- Periods: Kofun period
- Location: Wakabayashi-ku, Sendai, Japan
- Region: Tōhoku region

History
- Built: late 4th or early 5th century AD

Site notes
- Elevation: 10 m (33 ft)
- Length: 110 m (360 ft)
- Excavation dates: 1968, 1972
- Public access: Yes (public park)

The Tōmizuka Kofun (遠見塚古墳) is a keyhole-shaped kofun burial mound located in the Wakabayashi ward of the city of Sendai, Miyagi in the Tōhoku region of northern Japan. It was constructed in the early to middle Kofun period, or around the late 4th to early 5th century AD, as the tomb of one or more of the gōzoku ruling the Miyagi Plain region. The site is a National Historic Site.

== Overview ==
The Tōmizuka Kofun is located on a natural embankment on the northern bank of the Hirose River at an altitude of about 10 meters, it is the fifth largest tomb in the Tōhoku region and the second largest in Miyagi prefecture after the Raijinyama Kofun. The tumulus has a total length of about 110 meters. The circular portion has a diameter of 63 meters and height of 6.5 meters. The square portion has a width of 37 meters and height of 2.5 meters. While this keyhole-shaped kofun has a characteristic shape, it is unusual is that the square front part is extremely lower than the round rear part. The tumulus is surrounded by an irregularly shaped moat with a width ranging from 10 meters to more than 40 meters in places.

The surrounding area the southern Sendai Plain is noted for extensive Yayoi period remains. The kofun was excavated by the Sendai City Board of Education in 1968 and 1972, with further work conducted in 1975 in preparation for the creation of a park. No haniwa or fukiishi were discovered. The circular mound was found to contain a burial chamber with two clay sarcophagus which are presumed to have each held a bamboo-shaped wooden coffin. The number of grave goods found was extremely few for the size of the kofun, and were all found in the east sarcophagus. Only one quartz cylindrical bead, four glass balls and 18 pieces of a black-lacquered bamboo comb were excavated. Fragments of Haji ware pottery used for ritual purposes were also found. These artifacts are preserved at the Sendai City Museum.

In 1947, when Japan was under American occupation, half of the circular portion of the tumulus was destroyed for dirt to expand nearby Kasuminome Air Field. Japan National Route 4 also cuts across the site diagonally, truncating one edge of the square portion of the tumulus. The site is now preserved as a public park.

The site is located approximately 3.5 kilometers southeast of Sendai Station.

== See also ==
- List of Historic Sites of Japan (Miyagi)
- Raijinyama Kofun
