= Sendai Airport Line =

Airport rail link in Miyagi Prefecture, Japan

Sendai Airport Access Line
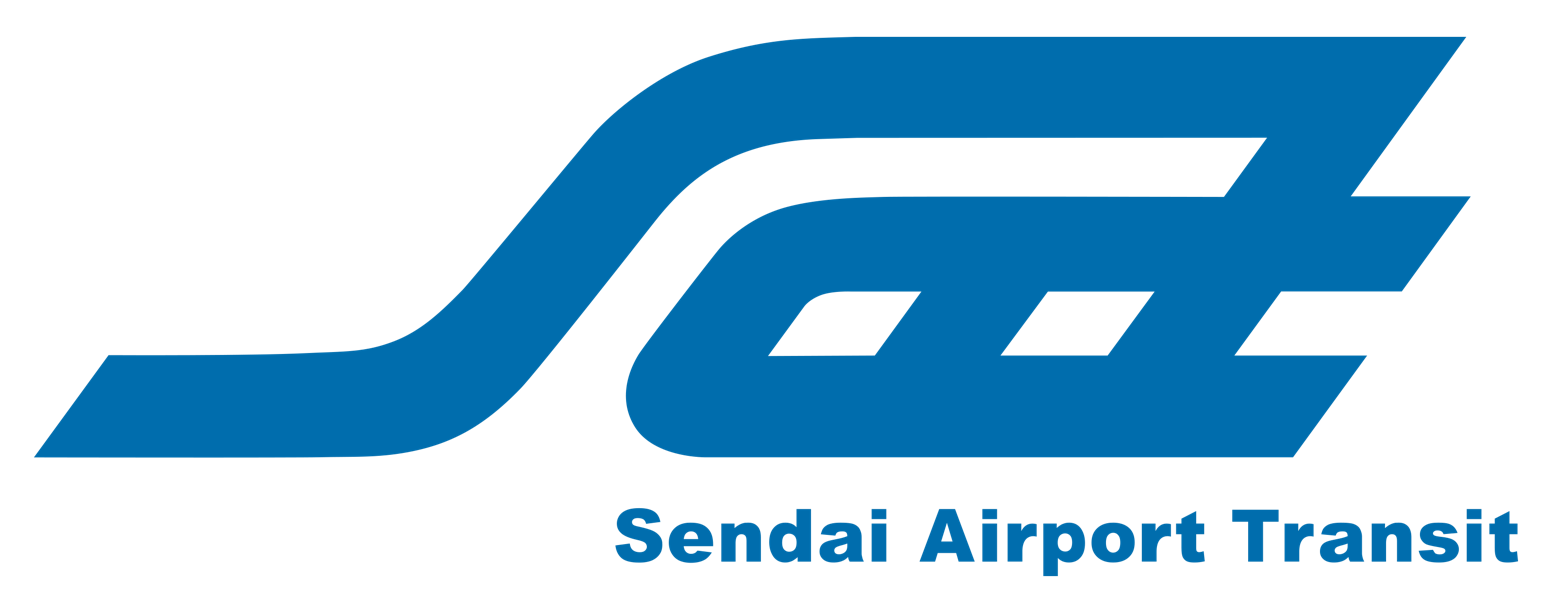

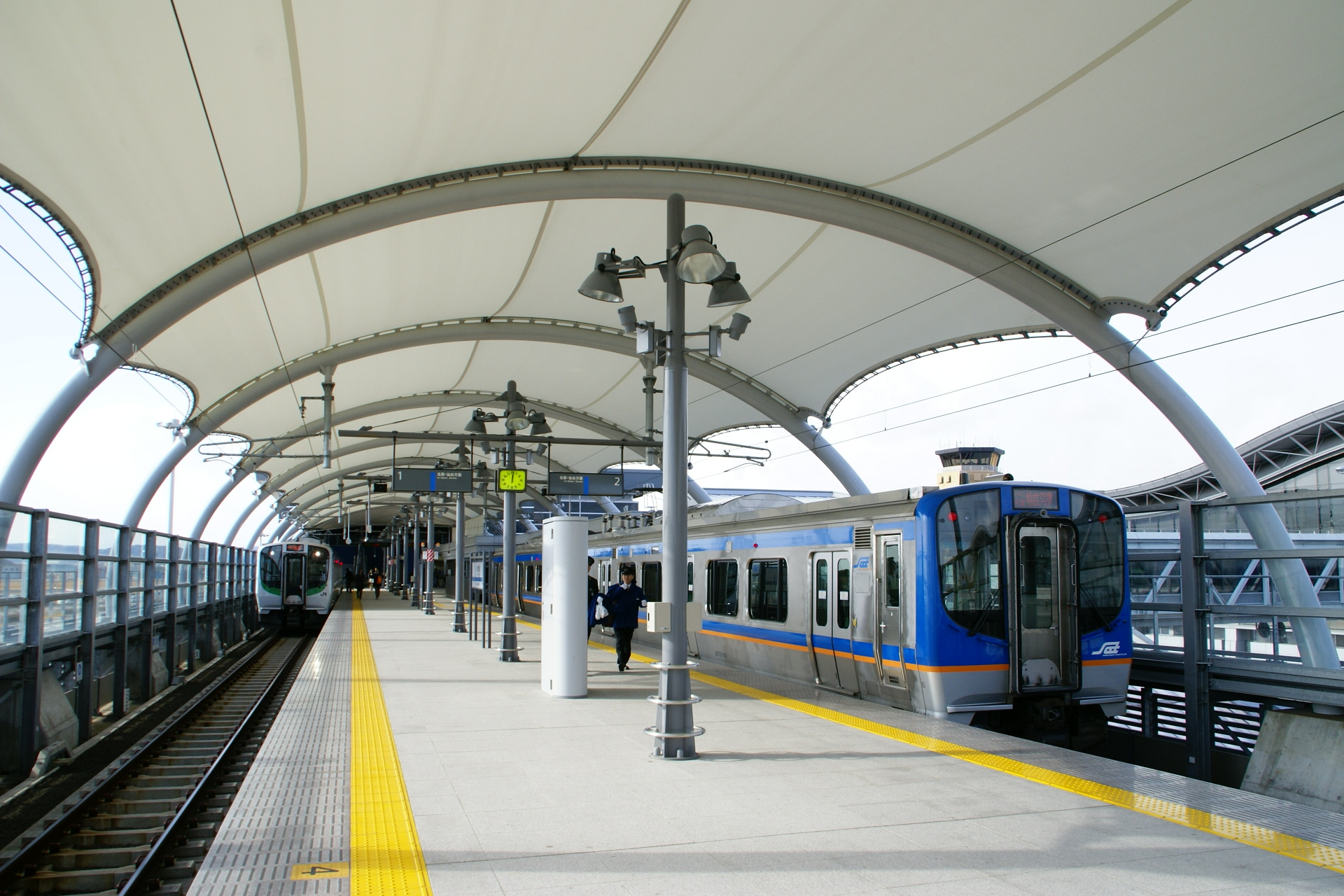
- The Sendai Airport terminus with JR E721-500 series (left) and SAT721 (right) trains at the platforms

Overview
- Other name: Sendai Airport Line
- Native name: 仙台空港線
- Owner: Sendai Airport Transit
- Locale: Miyagi Prefecture
- Termini: Natori; Sendai Airport
- Stations: 4
- Website: www.senat.co.jp/en/top

Service
- Rolling stock: SAT721 series

History
- Work began: 2002
- Opened: March 18, 2007; 19 years ago

Technical
- Line length: 7.1 km (4.4 mi)
- Number of tracks: 1
- Track gauge: 1,067 mm (3 ft 6 in)
- Electrification: Overhead line, 20 kV 50 Hz AC
Route map

The Sendai Airport Access Line (Japanese: 仙台空港アクセス線, Hepburn: Sendai Kūkō akusesu sen) is a Japanese airport rail link service operated by third-sector railway operator Sendai Airport Transit Co., Ltd. connecting Sendai Airport Station to Natori Station. Service began on March 18, 2007.

== Services ==
All trains operate through services to and from Sendai Station via the Tōhoku Main Line. All services are local trains, stopping at every station.

Trains operate approximately every 20 minutes between 9 a.m. and 5 p.m., and every 30 minutes at other times. The journey takes 25 to 29 minutes.

== Station list ==
All stations are in Miyagi Prefecture.

Line	Station	Distance in km (mi)	Transfers	Location
Tōhoku	Sendai 仙台	10.4 (6.5)	Tōhoku Shinkansen; Akita Shinkansen; ■ Jōban Line; ■ Senzan Line; ■ Senseki Line; ■ Tōhoku Main Line; ■ Sendai Subway Namboku Line; ■ Sendai Subway Tōzai Line	Aoba, Sendai
Tōhoku	Nagamachi 長町	5.9 (3.7)	■ Jōban Line; ■ Tōhoku Main Line; ■ Sendai Subway Namboku Line	Taihaku, Sendai
Tōhoku	Taishidō 太子堂	4.9 (3.0)	■ Jōban Line; ■ Tōhoku Main Line	Taihaku, Sendai
Tōhoku	Minami-Sendai 南仙台	2.7 (1.7)	■ Jōban Line; ■ Tōhoku Main Line	Taihaku, Sendai
Tōhoku	Natori 名取	0 (0)	■ Jōban Line; ■ Tōhoku Main Line	Natori
Airport	Natori 名取	0 (0)	■ Jōban Line; ■ Tōhoku Main Line	Natori
Airport	Morisekinoshita 杜せきのした	1.8 (1.1)		Natori
Airport	Mitazono 美田園	3.8 (2.4)		Natori
Airport	Sendai Airport 仙台空港	7.1 (4.4)		Natori

== Rolling stock ==
Three two-car SAT721 series electric multiple unit (EMU) trainsets, totaling six cars. They operate alongside JR East's similarly designed E721-500 series sets. Trains operate in two-, four-, or six-car formations. The stainless-steel-bodied trains have a barrier-free design and a maximum speed of 120 kilometres per hour (75 mph). LED displays provide station and destination information, while onboard announcements are made in Japanese and English.

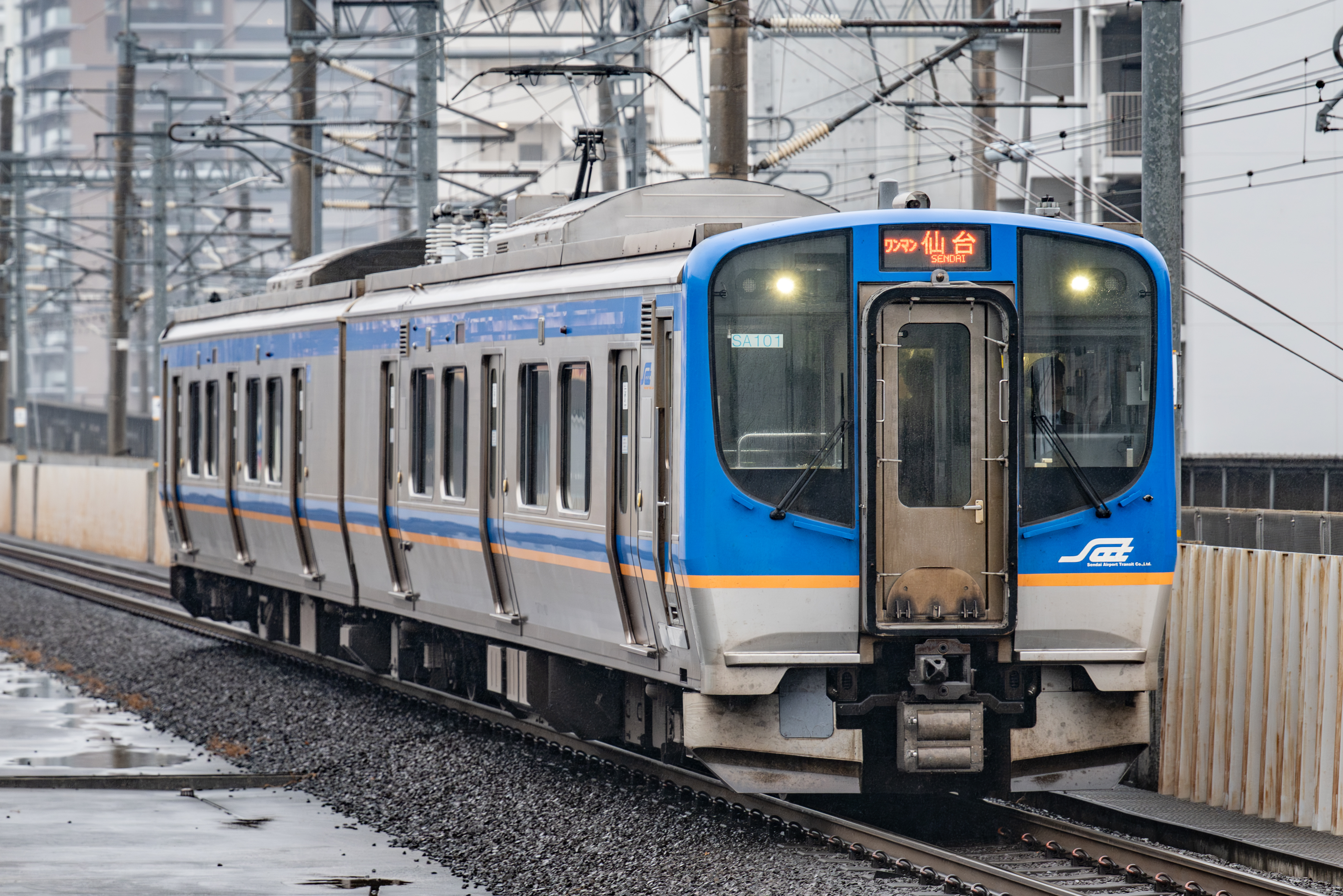
SAT721 series

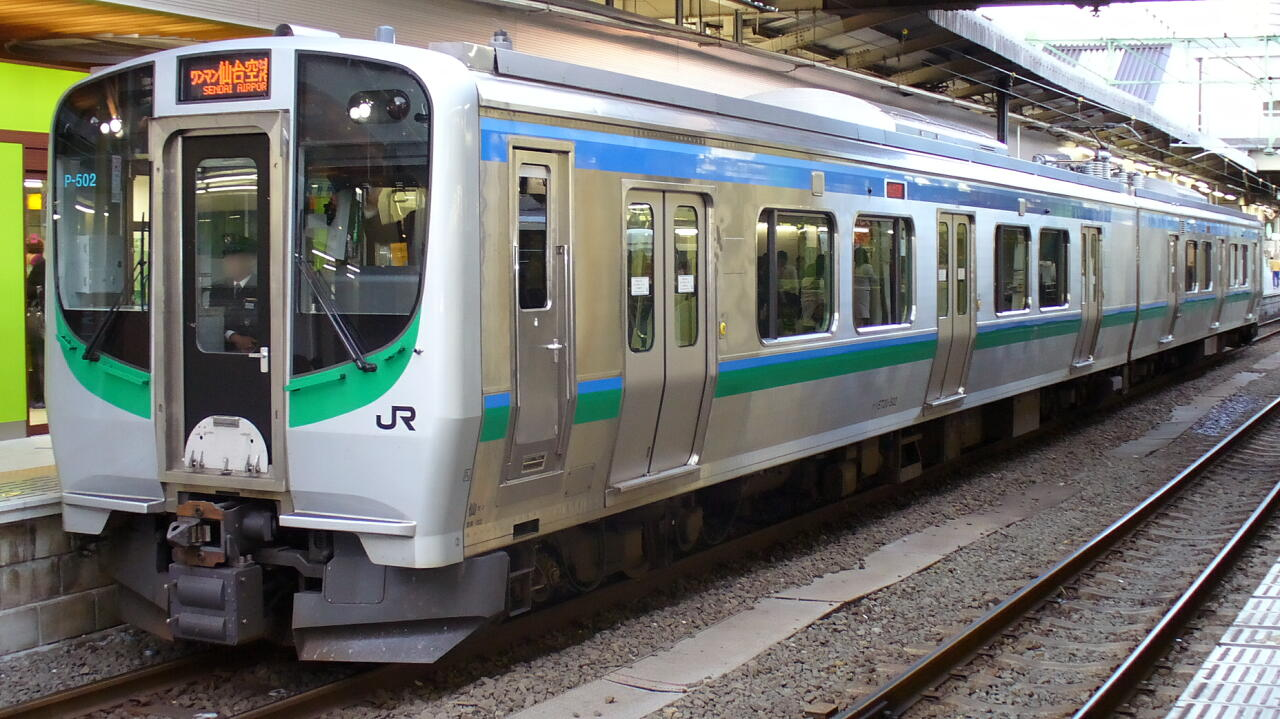
JR E721-500 series

== Sendai Airport Transit ==
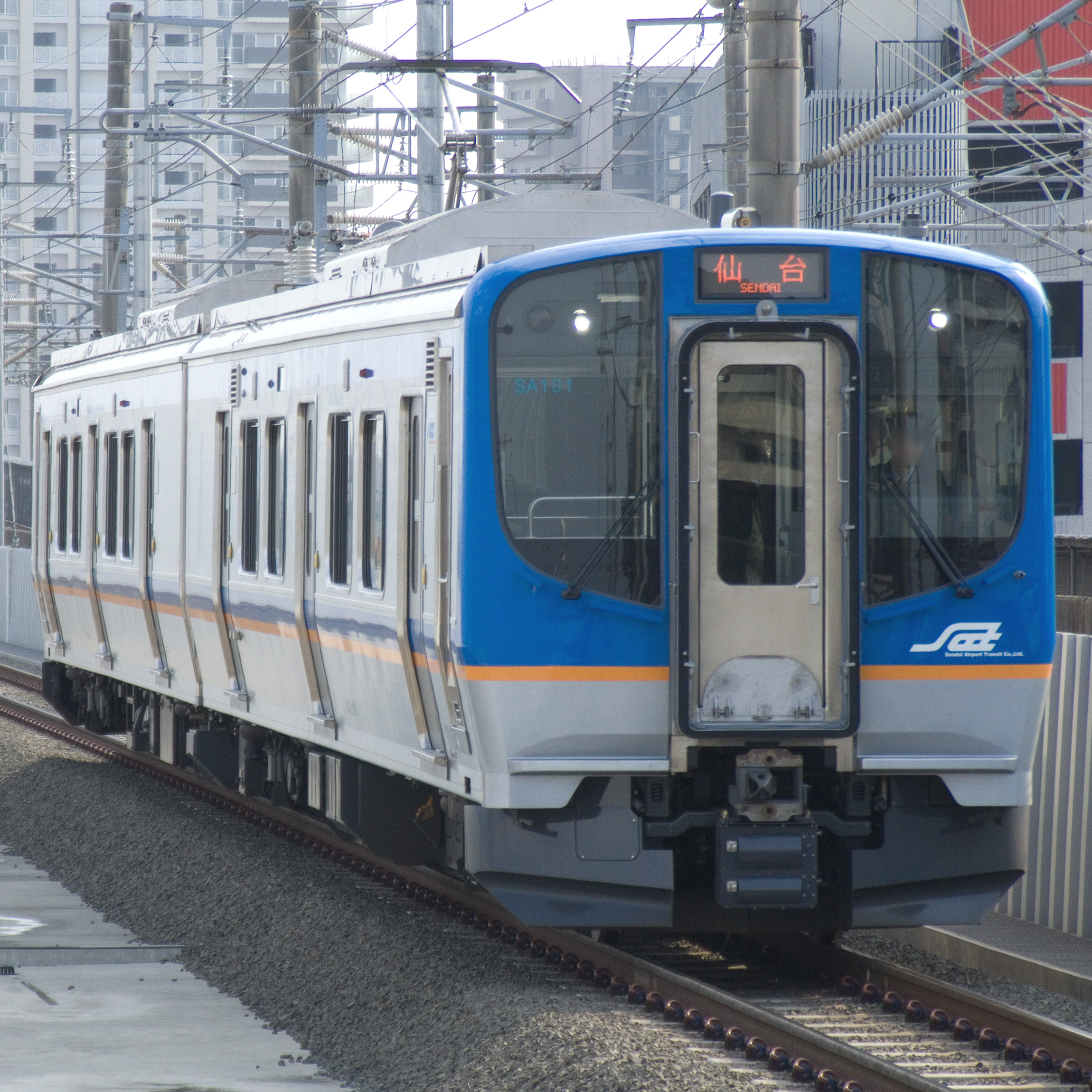
A SAT721 series train owned by SAT

Sendai Airport Transit Co., Ltd. (仙台空港鉄道 株式会社, Sendai Kūkō Tetsudō Kabushikigaisha; or, SAT) is a third-sector railway company in charge of constructing and operating the Sendai Airport Line train service between Sendai Airport Station and Natori Station in Miyagi Prefecture, Japan.

The company was founded on 7 April 2000. Construction of the line commenced in 2002. The construction cost is was to reach 34.9 billion yen, and it may take as long as thirty years before the railway turns a profit.

The Sendai Airport Line opened on March 18, 2007.

The line was severely damaged by the 2011 Tōhoku earthquake and tsunami, and service was suspended indefinitely from March 11, 2011. The line reopened on October 1 of that year.
