= Natori Station =

Railway station in Natori, Miyagi Prefecture, Japan

Natori Station 名取駅
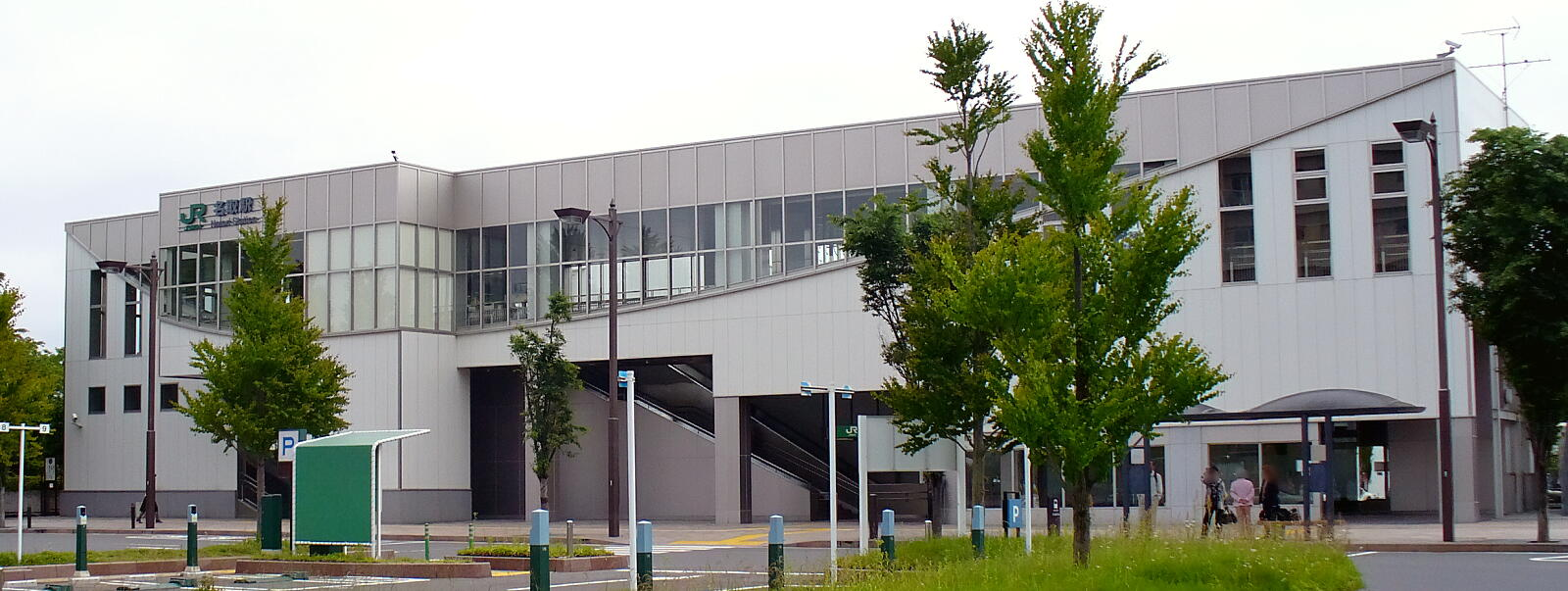
- Natori Station, West Exit June 2008

General information
- Location: 2 Masuda; Natori, Miyagi; Japan
- Coordinates: 38°10′23″N 140°52′57″E
- Operator: JR East; Sendai Airport Transit
- Lines: Tōhoku Main Line; Sendai Airport Line
- Distance: 341.4 km (212.1 mi) from Tokyo; 7.1 km (4.4 mi) from Sendai Airport
- Platforms: 1 side platform, 1 island platform
- Tracks: 3

Other information
- Status: Staffed (Midori no Madoguchi)
- Website: Official website

History
- Opened: October 11, 1888
- Former names: Masada (to 1963)

Passengers
- FY2018: 12,927 daily

Services
Preceding station	JR East	Following station
Iwanuma towards Fukushima	Tōhoku Main Line Rapid City Rabbit	Minami-Sendai towards Sendai
Tatekoshi towards Kuroiso	Tōhoku Main Line Local	Minami-Sendai towards Morioka
Tatekoshi towards Shinagawa	Jōban Line Local-Futsuu	Minami-Sendai towards Sendai
Preceding station	Sendai Airport Transit	Following station
Morisekinoshita towards Sendai Airport	Sendai Airport Line	Minami-Sendai towards Sendai
Location
- Location within Miyagi Prefecture Location within Japan

Natori Station (Japanese: 名取駅, Hepburn: Natori-eki) is a junction railway station in the city of Natori, Miyagi, Japan, operated by East Japan Railway Company (JR East). The station also has a freight terminal operated by the Japan Freight Railway Company.

== Lines ==
Natori Station is located along the Tōhoku Main Line, and is located 341.4 kilometres (212.1 mi) from the official starting point of the line at Tokyo. It is also served by the Joban Line, whose trains run past the official terminus at Iwanuma Station on to Sendai, and is the terminal station for the Sendai Airport Line.

== Station layout ==
The station has one side platform and one island platform, serving three tracks in total, connected to the station building by a footbridge. The station has a Midori no Madoguchi staffed ticket office.

=== Platforms ===
1	■ Tōhoku Main Line	for Iwanuma, Shiroishi, and Fukushima
1	■ Joban Line	for Watari and Haranomachi
1	■ Sendai Airport Line	for Sendai Airport
2	■ Sendai Airport Line	for Sendai
3	■ Tōhoku Main Line	for Sendai, Matsushima, and Kogota

== History ==
Natori Station opened on October 11, 1888 as Masuda Station (増田駅). It adopted its present name on May 25, 1963. The station was absorbed into the JR East network upon the privatization of the Japanese National Railways (JNR) on April 1, 1987.

== Passenger statistics ==
In fiscal 2018, the station was used by an average of 12,927 passengers daily (boarding passengers only).

== Surrounding area ==
- National Route 4
- Natori City Hall
- Natori Post Office
- Sapporo Beer Sendai Factory
- Sendai Beer Garden

== See also ==
- List of railway stations in Japan
