= Natori, Miyagi =

Natori 名取市
- City
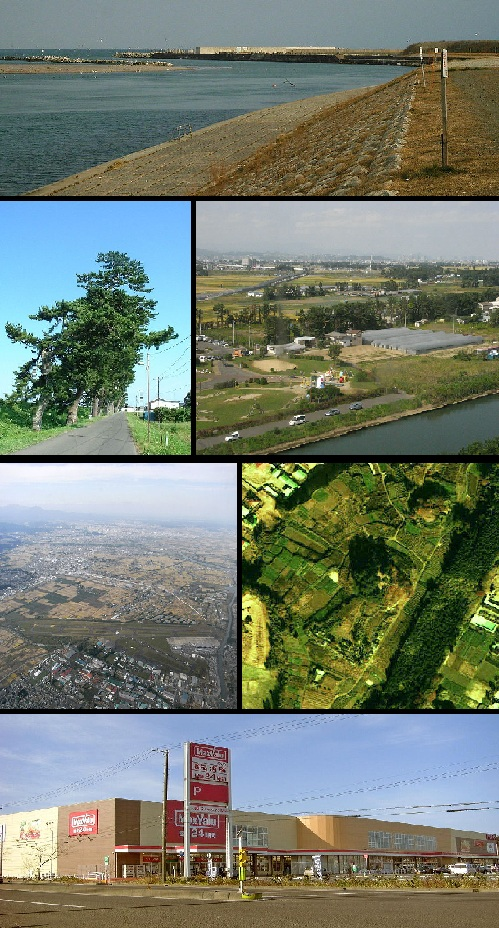
- Natori River, Andon Matsuri; Teizan-bori, Sendai Airport; Raijinyama kofun, Aeontown Natori Shopping Center

- Flag Seal

- Location of Natori in Miyagi Prefecture

- Coordinates: 38°10′17.5″N 140°53′30.5″E
- Country: Japan
- Region: Tōhoku
- Prefecture: Miyagi

Government
  - Mayor: Yamada Shirō

Area
  - Total: 98.17 km^{2} (37.90 sq mi)

Population (October 10, 2020)
  - Total: 78,718
  - Density: 801.9/km^{2} (2,077/sq mi)
- Time zone: UTC+9 (Japan Standard Time)
- Phone number: 022-384-2111
- Address: Yanagida 80, Masuda, Natori-shi, Miyagi-ken 981-1292
- Climate: Cfa
- Website: Official website
- Symbols
- Flower: Peach
- Tree: Japanese beech

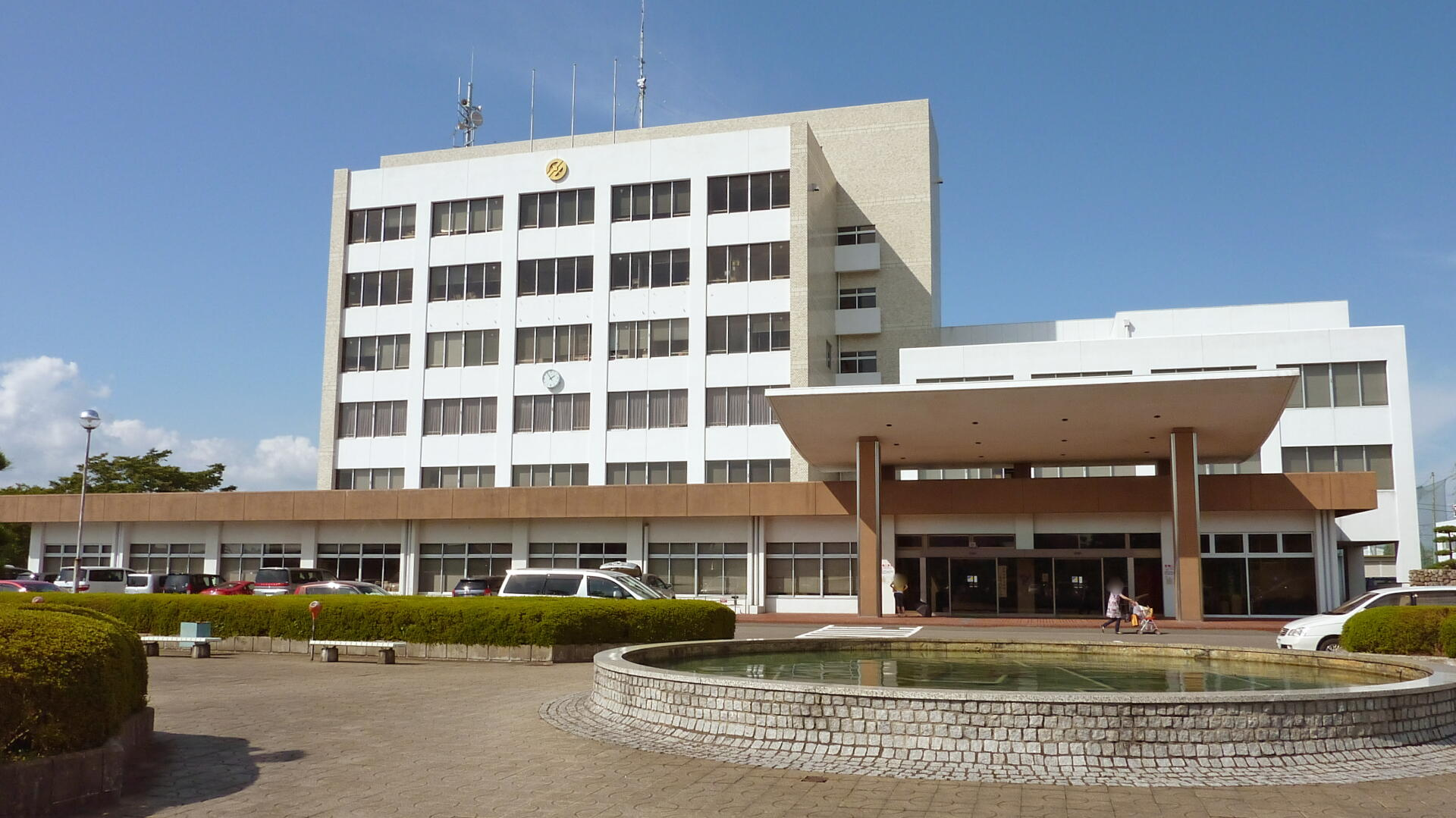
Natori City Hall

Natori (名取市, Natori-shi) is a city located in Miyagi Prefecture, Japan. As of 31 May 2020, the city had an estimated population of 79,459 in 31,748 households, and a population density of 810 persons per km^{2}. The total area of the city is 98.17 square kilometres (37.90 sq mi).

== Geography ==
Natori is in east-central Miyagi Prefecture, bordered by the Pacific Ocean to the east. Natori is located in the fertile plains of the Natori River and the Masuda River deltas; however, the Natori River is actually not inside Natori city limits. Traditionally, the area known as Natori District extended from the Natori River in the north and into the west. However, these regions have been absorbed into the greater Sendai area and are no longer part of Natori.

=== Neighboring municipalities ===
Miyagi Prefecture

- Iwanuma
- Murata
- Sendai

=== Climate ===
Natori has a humid subtropical climate (Köppen climate classification Cfa) characterized by mild summers and cold winters. The average annual temperature in Natori is 12.5 °C (54.5 °F). The average annual rainfall is 1,124.3 mm (44.26 in) with September as the wettest month. The temperatures are highest on average in August, at around 24.3 °C (75.7 °F), and lowest in January, at around 1.6 °C (34.9 °F).

Climate data for Natori (elevation 2 m, 2003–2020 normals, extremes 2003–present)
Month	Jan	Feb	Mar	Apr	May	Jun	Jul	Aug	Sep	Oct	Nov	Dec	Year
Record high °C (°F)	14.7 (58.5)	22.0 (71.6)	22.9 (73.2)	28.9 (84.0)	32.1 (89.8)	35.6 (96.1)	37.3 (99.1)	37.2 (99.0)	36.0 (96.8)	29.7 (85.5)	26.7 (80.1)	21.3 (70.3)	37.3 (99.1)
Mean daily maximum °C (°F)	6.2 (43.2)	6.8 (44.2)	10.3 (50.5)	14.8 (58.6)	19.5 (67.1)	22.5 (72.5)	25.6 (78.1)	27.7 (81.9)	24.8 (76.6)	19.9 (67.8)	14.5 (58.1)	8.9 (48.0)	16.8 (62.2)
Daily mean °C (°F)	1.6 (34.9)	2.2 (36.0)	5.4 (41.7)	10.0 (50.0)	15.1 (59.2)	19.0 (66.2)	22.4 (72.3)	24.3 (75.7)	21.1 (70.0)	15.4 (59.7)	9.6 (49.3)	4.2 (39.6)	12.5 (54.5)
Mean daily minimum °C (°F)	−3.1 (26.4)	−2.6 (27.3)	0.2 (32.4)	5.1 (41.2)	11.1 (52.0)	16.0 (60.8)	20.0 (68.0)	21.6 (70.9)	17.6 (63.7)	10.8 (51.4)	4.5 (40.1)	−0.5 (31.1)	8.4 (47.1)
Record low °C (°F)	−10.0 (14.0)	−11.8 (10.8)	−7.7 (18.1)	−2.6 (27.3)	2.9 (37.2)	7.9 (46.2)	13.9 (57.0)	13.6 (56.5)	7.1 (44.8)	0.5 (32.9)	−3.7 (25.3)	−8.4 (16.9)	−11.8 (10.8)
Average precipitation mm (inches)	31.4 (1.24)	23.3 (0.92)	63.0 (2.48)	85.5 (3.37)	96.0 (3.78)	107.6 (4.24)	155.6 (6.13)	128.8 (5.07)	169.1 (6.66)	164.3 (6.47)	55.9 (2.20)	43.2 (1.70)	1,124.3 (44.26)
Average precipitation days (≥ 1.0 mm)	3.7	4.6	6.3	7.8	8.1	9.4	13.4	10.4	10.3	8.2	5.5	5.4	93.9
Source: Japan Meteorological Agency (2003–2020 normals, extremes 2003–present)

== Demographics ==
Per Japanese census data, the population of Natori has increased over the past 40 years.

Historical population
Year	Pop.	±%
1920	20,758	—
1930	23,584	+13.6%
1940	24,669	+4.6%
1950	32,026	+29.8%
1960	33,026	+3.1%
1970	40,845	+23.7%
1980	49,715	+21.7%
1990	53,732	+8.1%
2000	67,216	+25.1%
2010	73,134	+8.8%
2020	78,718	+7.6%

== History ==
The area of present-day Natori was part of ancient Mutsu Province, and was under control of the Date clan of Sendai Domain during the Edo period, under the Tokugawa shogunate. In 1867, Natori came within the borders of the new Rikuzen Province, which later became part of Miyagi Prefecture. With the establishment of the modern municipalities system on April 1, 1889 Natori District was formed with six villages: Masuda, Higashi-Taga, Shimo-Masuda, Tatekoshi, Aishiwa and Takadate. On April 1, 1896, Masuda was elevated to town status as was Higashi-Taga on April 1, 1928. On April 1, 1955, the towns of Masuda and Yuriage, and the villages of Shimo-Masuda, Tatekoshi, Aishiwa and Takadate were merged to create the town of Natori, which was elevated to city status on October 1, 1958. The official boundaries of Natori City have changed since 1958, as Sendai City redefines its area to include districts to the north and west of Natori.

=== Damage and casualties from 2011 Tōhoku earthquake and tsunami ===
The area was badly affected by the 2011 Tōhoku earthquake and tsunami.

Large portions of the coastal area including Sendai Airport was severely damaged by the tsunami.

On March 14, rescue workers arrived in an area of Natori known as Yuriage and found few survivors, as much of the Yuriage area was wiped out. The population had 30 minutes between the earthquake and the tsunami, and though many had time to escape city officials initially said it was impossible to determine the number of casualties.

== Government ==
Natori has a mayor-council form of government with a directly elected mayor and a unicameral city legislature of 21 members. Natori contributes two seats to the Miyagi Prefectural legislature. In terms of national politics, the city is part of Miyagi 3rd district of the lower house of the Diet of Japan.

== Economy ==
Natori has a mixed economy. Based on data collected in 2000:

- 6.4% of the population of Natori is involved in the primary agricultural and fishing industries.
- 26.1% of the population of Natori is involved in secondary processing industries, particularly at the Nikon Camera factory and at the Sapporo Breweries factory.

== Public facilities ==
=== Medical facilities ===
Natori is home to the Miyagi Prefectural Psychiatric Medical Center and the Prefectural Cancer Center.

=== Educational and cultural facilities ===
Natori's educational facilities include a private university (Shokei Gakuin University).

The city has eleven public elementary schools and five public junior high schools operated by the city government and two public high schools operated by the Miyagi Prefectural Board of Education. The prefecture also operates one special education school for the handicapped and two technical schools.

The Natori City Library has a collection of approximately 140,000 books (two books for every person in the city) as of 2002.

The Cultural Meeting Center (文化会館, Bunkakaikan) has a medium-sized hall and rehearsal room, a music room, a cultural centre which includes an exhibition gallery, a professional concert hall and stage, catering facilities and meeting rooms, and other general-purpose facilities for communal use. The structure was designed by Fumihiko Maki and is considered a local attraction.

Additionally, Natori is home to a Media Resource Centre, a community gym, the Miyagi Cycling Centre, and several public beaches and swimming pools.

== Transportation ==
=== Airport ===
- Sendai Airport

=== Railway ===
East Japan Railway Company (JR East) - Tōhoku Main Line / Jōban Line

- Natori - Tatekoshi

East Japan Railway Company (JR East) - Sendai Airport Line

- Natori - Morisekinoshita - Mitazono - Sendai Airport

=== Highway ===
- Tōhoku Expressway – Minami-Sendai IC
- Sendai-Tōbu Road – Natori and Sendai Airport IC
- Sendai-Nanbu Road – Yamada IC
- National Route 4
- National Route 286

== Local attractions ==
=== Festivals ===
The Natori Summer Festival is held in early August, and is a town celebration of summer. The celebration is marked by fireworks and traditional Japanese festival foods, such as yakisoba and yakiniku.

The Sapporo Beer Festival is held at the Sapporo Beer Factory. The factory opens to the public for tours of the factory and other events including free beer tasting.

The Donto-sai Festival is held at the height of winter. Men and women wear only sparse, white clothing and walk silently through the town, receiving sake from local residents along the way. The event culminates in a communal purification ritual and bonfire at Takekoma Shrine.

=== Sports ===
The Natori Sports Park, constructed by Tohoku Electric, is a public area used for various sports meetings and other community events, such as open-air markets.

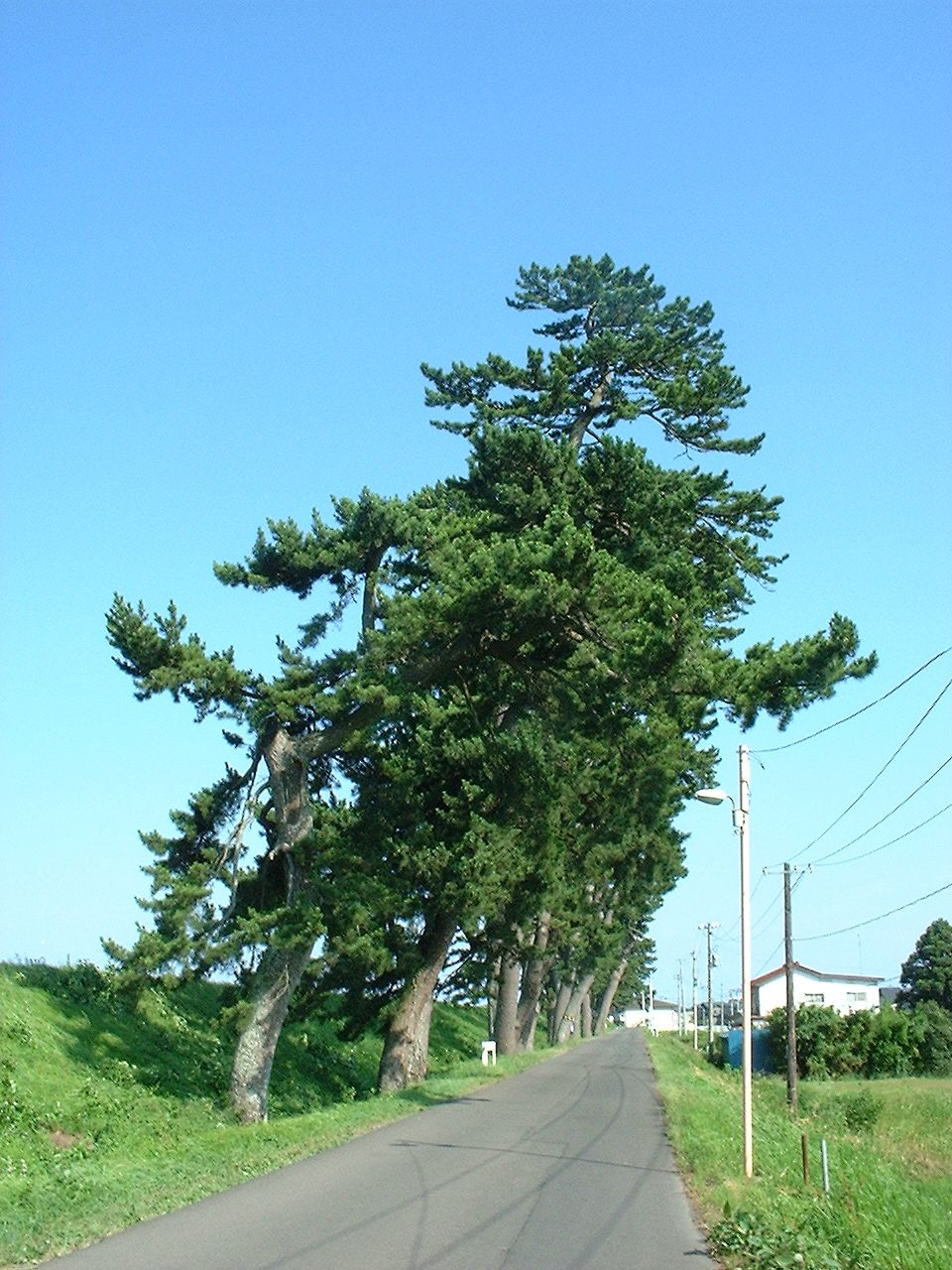
Historical lantern-covered Matsu pines standing by the Natori River dike.

=== Historical sites ===
The Nakazawa Family Estate (住宅, Juutaku), ancestral home of the Nakazawa Clan of bushi warriors, has been designated a National Treasure under the Law for the Protection of Cultural Properties. It was constructed in the late 18th century and has an historically important design, including a thatched roof.

The Raijinyama Kofun (雷神山古墳) is a keyhole tumulus constructed sometime circa the 4th and 5th centuries CE, located in an archaeological park. The park contains numerous other tumuli of varying age, both keyhole and circular. It is a National Historic Site.

Natori contains many kofun tumuli, including the Iinozaka Kofun Cluster (飯野坂古墳群), which is also a National Historic Site.

Natori is home to several sites and artifacts related to Date Masamune, the founder of Sendai Domain. These include 300-year-old pine trees standing by the Natori River dike, which are decorated with paper lanterns and are said to have been planted by Masamune himself.

=== Other sites ===
Natori, as a coastal town, has open local fresh fish markets. These markets are open in the port district, every Sunday throughout most of the year.

=== Specialty products, items and gifts ===
Because of the Japanese tradition of gift-giving, most cities in Japan have something considered a "local specialty" to be used as omiyage. Natori's main omiyage specialty is kamaboko, a fish paste boiled in bamboo grass. Another local specialty is "beer-tella", a form of castella sponge cake that has been made with brewer's yeast rather than baker's yeast. As one might expect, "beer-tella" smells strongly of beer, and is made at the Sapporo Beer Factory.

== Sister cities ==
- Guararapes, Brazil, since March 31, 1979
- Kaminoyama, Yamagata, Japan since May 10, 1978
- Shingū, Wakayama, Japan since October 8, 2008
- Sooke, Canada since March 20, 2026

== Notable people from Natori, Miyagi ==
- Midori Kuzuoka, Japanese fashion model
- Yudai Tanaka, Japanese football player (Sanfrecce Hiroshima, J1 League)
