= Sendai Airport Station =

Railway station in Natori, Miyagi Prefecture, Japan

Sendai Airport Station 仙台空港駅
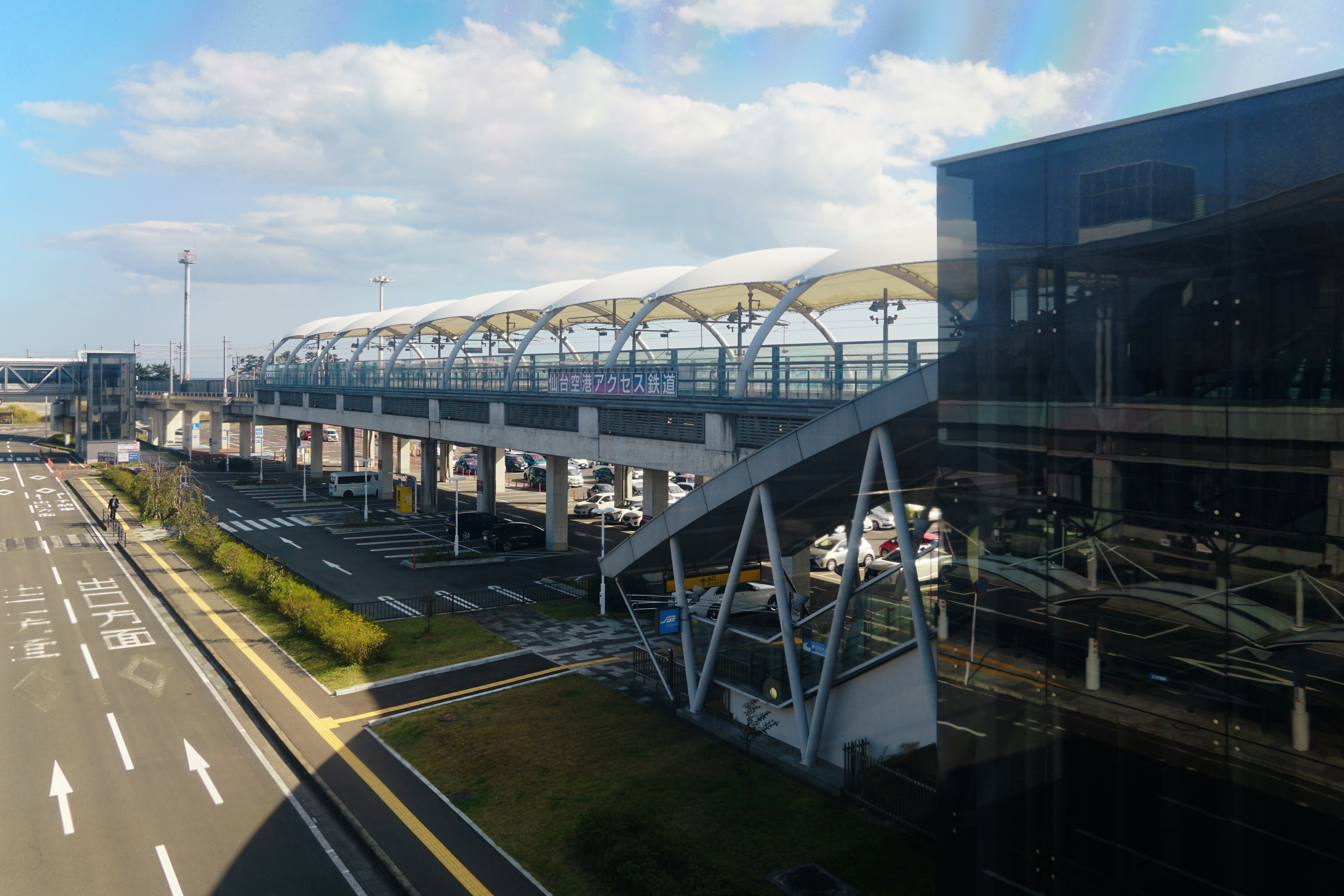
- Sendai Airport Station, June 2010

General information
- Location: Minamihara Shinomasuda; Natori, Miyagi; Japan
- Coordinates: 38°08′14″N 140°55′47″E
- Operator: Sendai Airport Transit
- Line: Sendai Airport Access Line
- Distance: 7.1 km (4.4 mi) from Natori
- Platforms: 1 island platform
- Tracks: 2

Construction
- Structure type: Elevated

Other information
- Status: Staffed
- Website: Official website

History
- Opened: 18 March 2007

Passengers
- FY2018: 5,551 daily

Services
Preceding station	Sendai Airport Transit	Following station
Terminus	Sendai Airport Line	Mitazono towards Sendai
Location
- Location within Miyagi Prefecture Location within Japan

Sendai Airport Station (Japanese: 仙台空港駅, Hepburn: Sendai kūkō eki) is a railway station in the city of Natori, Miyagi, Japan, operated by third-sector railway operator Sendai Airport Transit (SAT).

== Lines ==
Sendai Airport Station is the southern terminal station of the Sendai Airport Line. It is located 7.1 kilometers from the starting point of the line at Natori and 17.5 kilometers from Sendai. There are 2-3 services per hour with a travel time to Sendai of 17 minutes by rapid service or 25 minutes by regular service.

== Station layout ==
The station consists of an elevated island platform serving two tracks. The station is staffed.

== History ==
The station opened on 18 March 2007, coinciding with the opening of the Sendai Airport Line. The line was severely damaged by the 2011 Tōhoku earthquake and tsunami and service was suspended indefinitely from 11 March 2011, not reopening until 1 October, nearly 7 months later.

== Passenger statistics ==
In fiscal 2018, the station was used by an average of 5,551 passengers daily (boarding passengers only).

== Surrounding area ==
- Sendai Airport

== See also ==
- List of railway stations in Japan
