= Iwanuma Station =

Railway station in Iwanuma, Miyagi Prefecture, Japan

Iwanuma Station 岩沼駅
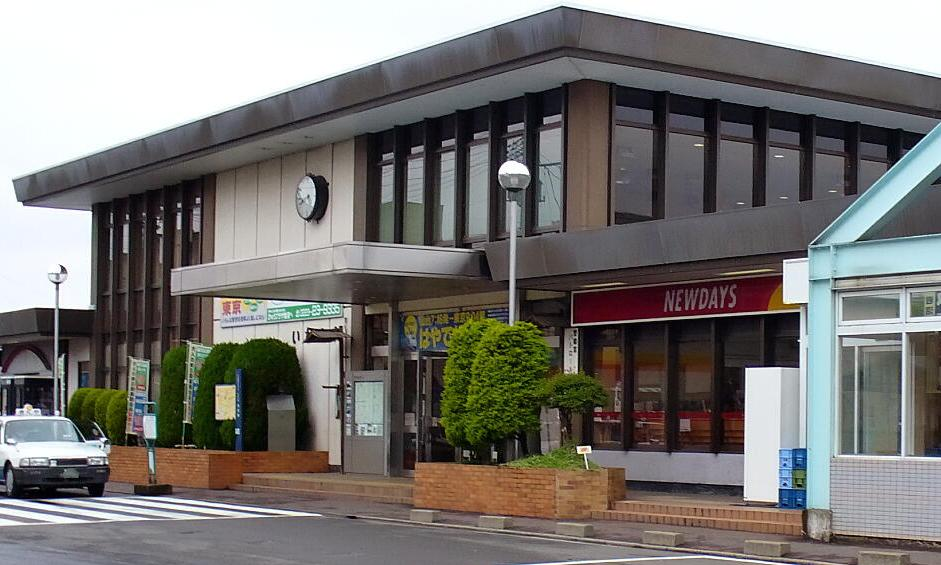
- East entrance in June 2010

General information
- Location: 1 Tateshita, Iwanuma-shi, Miyagi-ken 989-2441; Japan
- Coordinates: 38°06′43″N 140°51′51″E
- Operator: JR East
- Lines: ■ Tōhoku Main Line; ■ Jōban Line
- Distance: 334.2 km from Tokyo
- Platforms: 1 side + 2 island platforms
- Tracks: 5

Other information
- Status: Staffed ("Midori no Madoguchi")
- Website: Official website

History
- Opened: 15 December 1887; 138 years ago

Passengers
- FY2018: 7093 daily

Services
Preceding station	JR East	Following station
Tsukinoki towards Fukushima	Tōhoku Main Line Rapid City Rabbit	Natori towards Sendai
Tsukinoki towards Kuroiso	Tōhoku Main Line Local	Tatekoshi towards Morioka
Watari towards Shinagawa	Hitachi	Sendai Terminus
Ōkuma towards Shinagawa	Jōban Line Local-Futsuu	Tatekoshi towards Sendai
Location
- Location within Miyagi Prefecture Location within Japan

Iwanuma Station (岩沼駅, Iwanuma-eki) is a railway station in the city of Iwanuma, Miyagi Prefecture, Japan, operated by East Japan Railway Company (JR East).

== Lines ==
Iwanuma Station is served by the Tōhoku Main Line, and is located 334.2 rail kilometers from the official starting point of the line at Tokyo. It is also served by the Jōban Line, and is 343.1 rail kilometers from the starting point of that line Nippori Station in Tokyo.

== Station layout ==
The station has one side platform and two island platforms connected to the station building by a footbridge. The station has a "Midori no Madoguchi" staffed ticket office.

=== Platforms ===
1	■ Jōban Line	for Haranomachi
2	■ Tōhoku Main Line	for Natori and Sendai
3	■ Tōhoku Main Line	for Shiroishi and Fukushima
4	■ Tōhoku Main Line	for Natori, Sendai, and Kogota
5	■ Tōhoku Main Line	for Natori, Sendai, and Kogota (starting trains)

== History ==
Iwanuma Station opened on 15 December 1887, on the Tōhoku Main Line. The Joban Line opened on 10 November 1897. The station was absorbed into the JR East network upon the privatization of the Japanese National Railways (JNR) on 1 April 1987. A new station building was completed in June 1998.

== Passenger statistics ==
In fiscal 2018, the station was used by an average of 7,093 passengers daily (boarding passengers only).

== Surrounding area ==
- Iwanuma City Hall
- Takekoma Shrine
- Iwanuma Post Office

== See also ==
- List of railway stations in Japan
