= Carex × uzenensis =

Scientific classification
- Kingdom: Plantae
- Clade: Tracheophytes
- Clade: Angiosperms
- Clade: Monocots
- Clade: Commelinids
- Order: Poales
- Family: Cyperaceae
- Genus: Carex
- Species: C. × uzenensis

Binomial name
- Carex × uzenensis Koidz.

Species of plant

Carex × uzenensis is a hybrid species of sedge and is native to Japan. Its parents are Carex forficula and Carex podogyna.
