= Itsutsubashi Station =

Metro station in Sendai, Japan

N11 Itsutsubashi Station 五橋駅
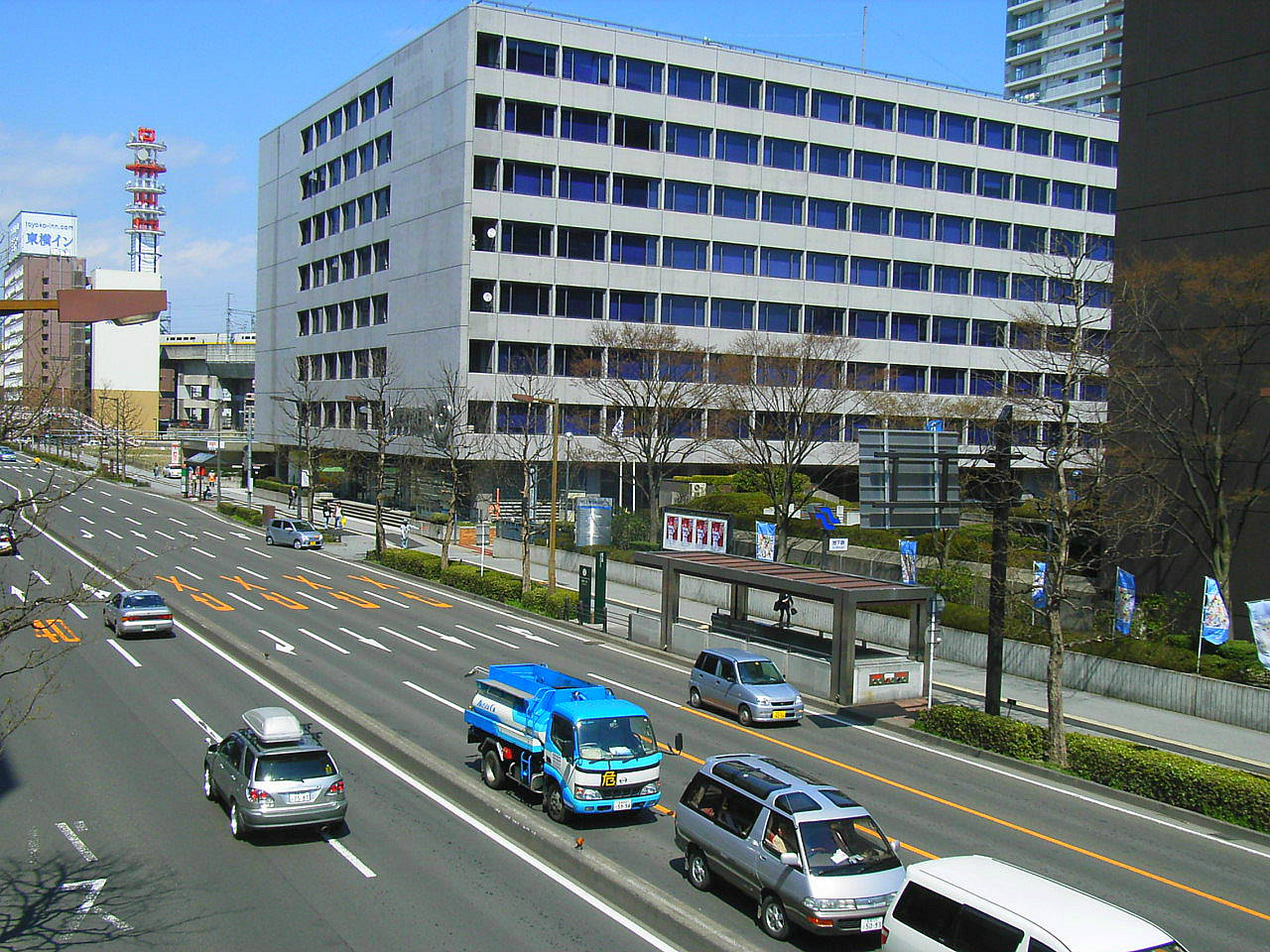
- Entrance North 3 of the Itsutsubashi Station in April 2005

General information
- Location: 2-1-10, Itsutsubashi, Aoba-ku, Sendai-shi, Miyagi-ken 980-0022; Japan
- Coordinates: 38°15′07″N 140°52′52″E
- System: Sendai Subway station
- Operator: Sendai City Transportation Bureau
- Line: Namboku Line
- Distance: 9.4 km (5.8 mi) from Izumi-Chūō
- Platforms: 1 island platform
- Connections: Bus stop

Other information
- Status: Staffed
- Station code: N11
- Website: Official website

History
- Opened: 15 July 1987; 39 years ago

Passengers
- FY 2015 (Daily): 5,857

Services
Preceding station	Sendai Subway	Following station
Atagobashi N12 towards Tomizawa	Namboku Line	Sendai N10 towards Izumi-Chūō
Location
- Location within Miyagi Prefecture Location within Japan

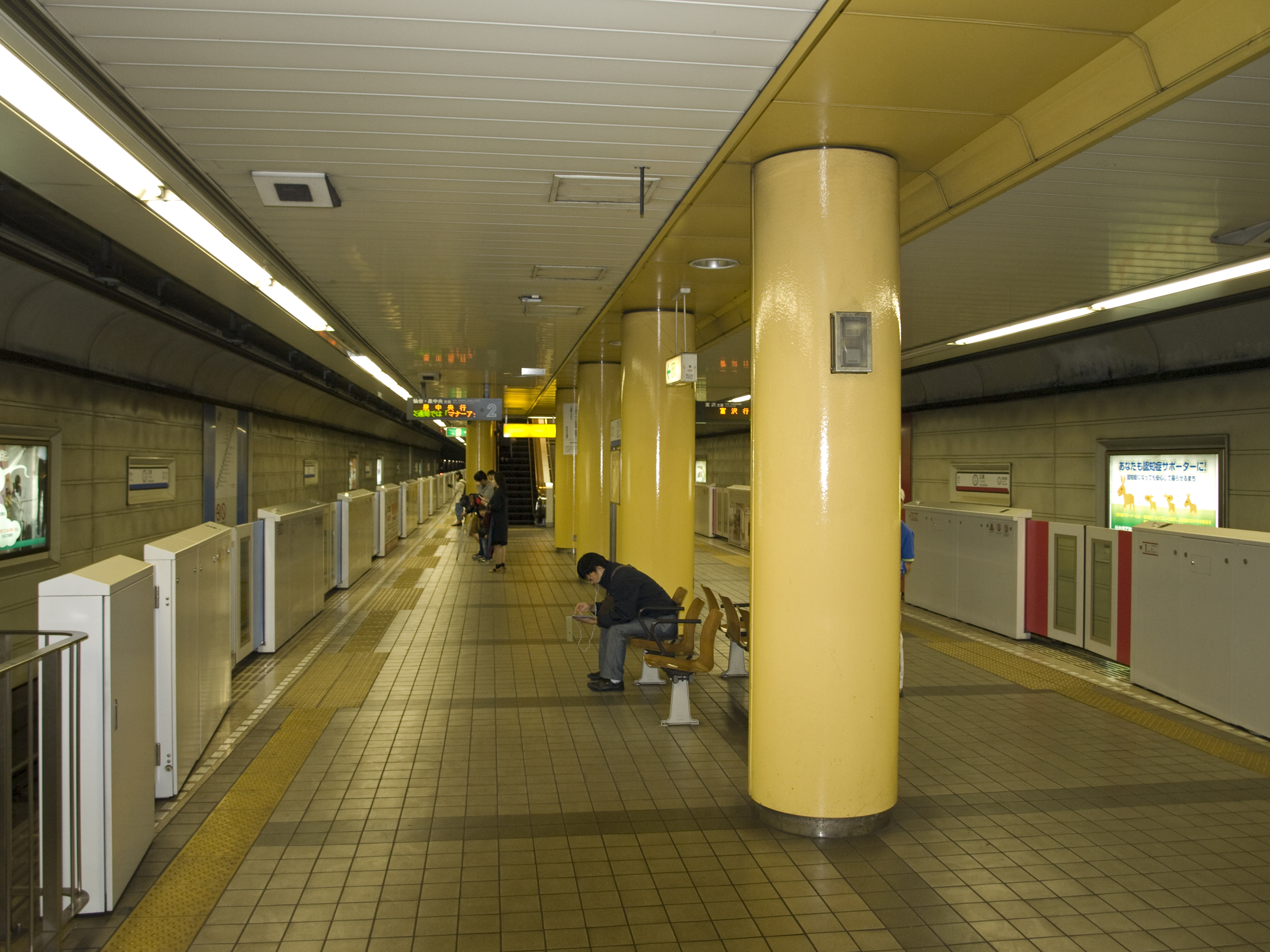
The platforms

Itsutsubashi Station (五橋駅, Itsutsubashi eki) is an underground metro station on the Sendai Subway Namboku Line in Aoba-ku, Sendai, Miyagi Prefecture, Japan.

== Lines ==
Itsutsubashi Station is on the Sendai Subway Namboku Line and is located 9.4 rail kilometers from the terminus of the line at Izumi-Chūō.

== Station layout ==
Itsutsubashi Station is an underground station with a single island platform serving two tracks.

=== Platforms ===
1	■ Namboku Line	■ for Tomizawa
2	■ Namboku Line	■ for Sendai, Izumi-Chūō

== History ==
Itsutsubashi Station opened on 15 July 1987.

== Passenger statistics ==
In fiscal 2015, the station was used by an average of 5,857 passengers daily.

== Surrounding area ==
- Sendai Municipal Hospital
- Tohoku Gakuin University Tsuchitoi Campus
- Sendai Itsutsubashi Junior High School
- Sendai Seiyo Gakuin Junior College
- Iris Ohyama Head Office
- Sumitomo Life Sendaichūō Building
