= Tohoku University Museum =

University museum in Japan

- 東北大学総合学術博物館
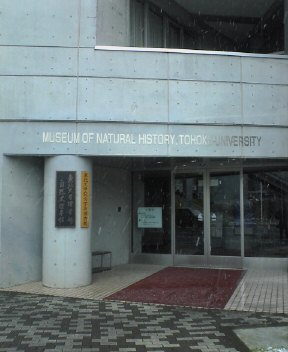
- Interactive map of the Tohoku University Museum area

General information
- Location: 6-3 Aoba, Aramaki, Aoba-ku, Sendai, Miyagi Prefecture, Japan
- Coordinates: 38°15′28″N 140°50′15″E
- Opened: 3 October 1995

Website
- Official website

The Tohoku University Museum (東北大学総合学術博物館, Tōhoku Daigaku Sōgō Gakujutsu Hakubutsukan) is a university museum affiliated with Tohoku University in Sendai, Miyagi Prefecture, Japan. From the collection of over 2,000,000 items, including rocks, minerals, fossils, archaeological materials, and maps, approximately 1,000 are on display at any one time.

== Publications ==
- Bulletin of the Tohoku University Museum (2001–; vols. 1–)

== See also ==
- Botanical Garden of Tohoku University
- Tōhoku History Museum
