= Tōshōgū Station =

Railway station in Sendai, Japan

Tōshōgū Station 東照宮駅
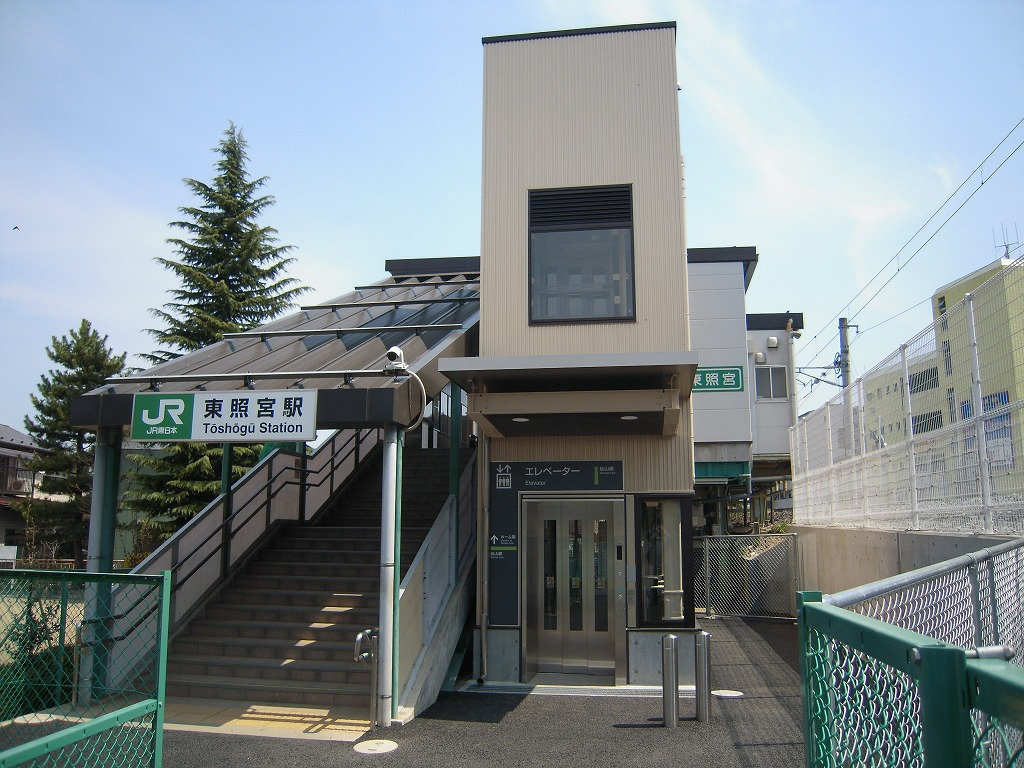
- Tōshōgū Station in April 2011)

General information
- Location: 5-18 Miyamachi, Aoba-ku, Sendai-shi, Miyagi-ken 980-0004; Japan
- Coordinates: 38°16′38.5″N 140°53′11″E
- Operator: JR East
- Line: ■ Senzan Line
- Distance: 3.2 km from Sendai
- Platforms: 1 side platform
- Tracks: 1

Other information
- Status: Staffed
- Website: Official website

History
- Opened: 18 November 1988

Passengers
- FY2018: 3,446 daily

Services
Preceding station	JR East	Following station
Kita-Sendai towards Yamagata	Senzan Line Rapid C Local	Sendai Terminus
Location
- Location within Miyagi Prefecture Location within Japan

Tōshōgū Station (東照宮駅, Tōshōgū eki) is a railway station in Aoba-ku, Sendai in Miyagi Prefecture, Japan, operated by East Japan Railway Company (JR East).

== Lines ==
Tōshōgū Station is served by the Senzan Line, and is located 3.2 rail kilometers from the terminus of the line at Sendai.

== Station layout ==
The station has one side platform serving a single bi-directional track. The station is staffed.

== History ==
Tōshōgū Station opened on 18 November 1988.

== Passenger statistics ==
In fiscal 2018, the station was used by an average of 3,446 passengers daily (boarding passengers only).

== Surrounding area ==
- Tohoku Pharmaceutical University
- Sendai Nake Post Office
- Sendai Tōshōgū
