= Sendai Akamon College =

Coordinates: 38.1543°N 140.5020°E

- 仙台赤門短期大学
- Type: Private
- Established: 2018
- Location: Ōsaki, Miyagi, Japan
- Website: miyagi-seishin.ac.jp

Sendai Akamon College (仙台赤門短期大学, Sendai Akamon Tanki Daigaku) is a private junior college in Aoba-ku, Sendai, Japan. Founded as a school for practitioners in acupuncture and moxibustion in 1947, it was re-established as a junior college on August 29, 2017. A nursing department opened in 2018.
