= Kuzuoka Station =

Railway station in Sendai, Japan

Kuzuoka Station 葛岡駅
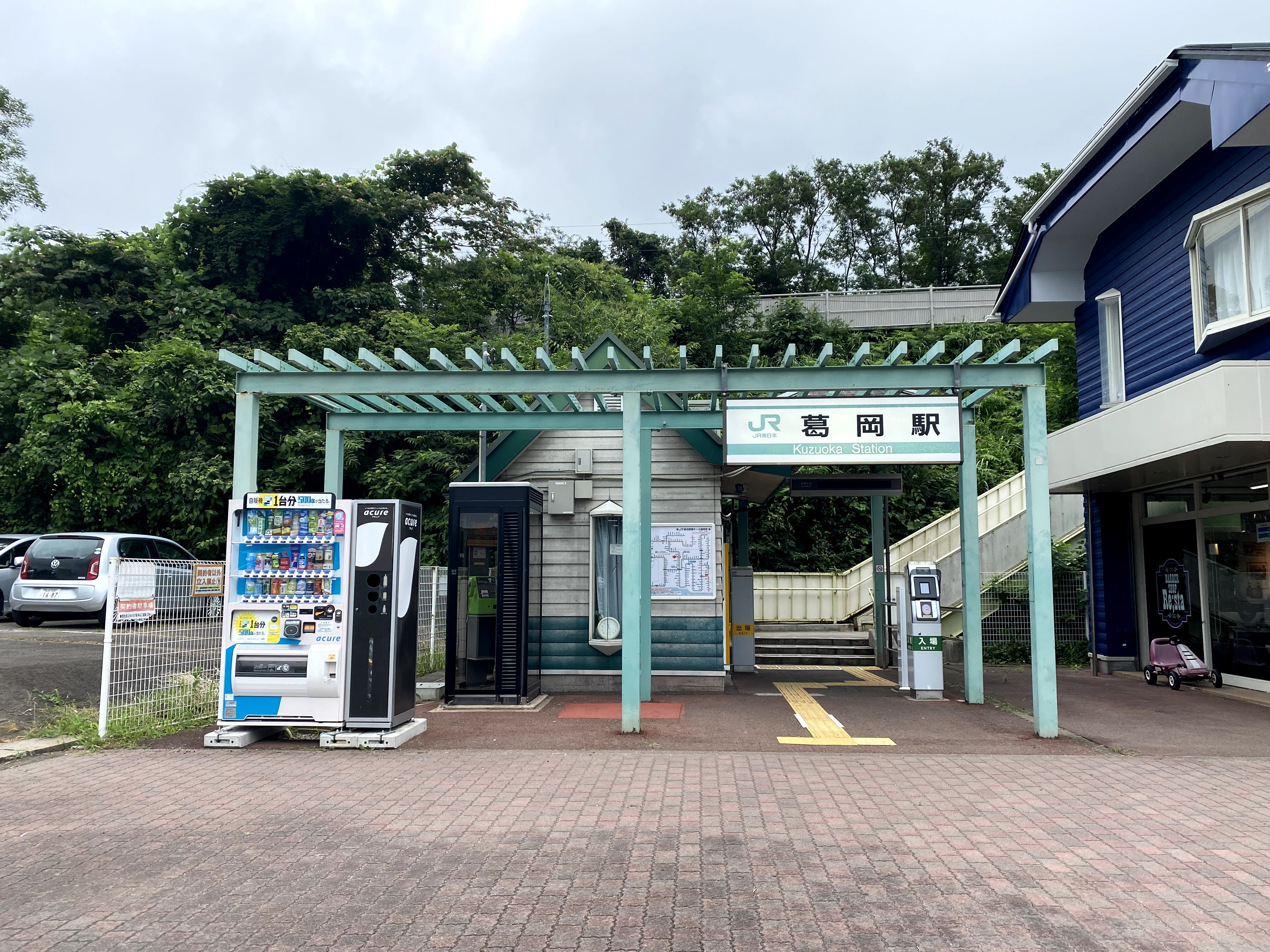
- Kuzuoka Station in July 2021

General information
- Location: 49 Kuzuoka-shita, Gōroku, Aoba-ku, Sendai-shi, Miyagi-ken 989-3121; Japan
- Coordinates: 38°16′8″N 140°49′5″E
- Operator: JR East
- Line: ■ Senzan Line
- Distance: 10.1 km from Sendai
- Platforms: 1 side platform
- Tracks: 1

Other information
- Status: Unstaffed
- Website: Official website

History
- Opened: 16 March 1991

Passengers
- FY2007: 426 daily

Services
Preceding station	JR East	Following station
Rikuzen-Ochiai towards Yamagata	Senzan Line Rapid C Local	Kunimi towards Sendai
Location
- Location within Miyagi Prefecture Location within Japan

Kuzuoka Station (葛岡駅, Kuzuoka-eki) is a railway station in Aoba-ku, Sendai in Miyagi Prefecture, Japan, operated by East Japan Railway Company (JR East).

== Lines ==
Kuzuoka Station is served by the Senzan Line, and is located 10.1 kilometers from the terminus of the line at Sendai.

== Station layout ==
The station has one side platform serving a single bi-directional track. The station is unattended. The platforms are located at the top of an embankment, with the station building at a lower level, connected by stairs.

== History ==
Kuzuoka Station opened on 16 March 1991. On 26 October 2003, compatibility with Suica IC cards was added to the station. On 15 December 2006, the administrative station to Kuzuoka Station was changed from Kita-Sendai Station to Ayashi Station.

== Passenger statistics ==
The average number of passengers per day at this station is notably low compared to other stations on the Senzan Line, but it is often used by visitors to the Kuzuoka Cemetery during the Obon and Higan periods.

Daily average number of passengers by year
Fiscal year	Daily average
1998	390
1999	384
2000	409
2001	397
2002	385
2003	422
2004	435
2005	437
2006	419
2007	426

== Surrounding area ==
- National Route 48
- Kuzuoka Cemetery
- Hirose River

== See also ==
- List of railway stations in Japan
