= Kita-Yobanchō Station =

Metro station in Sendai, Japan

N07 Kita-Yobanchō Station 北四番丁駅
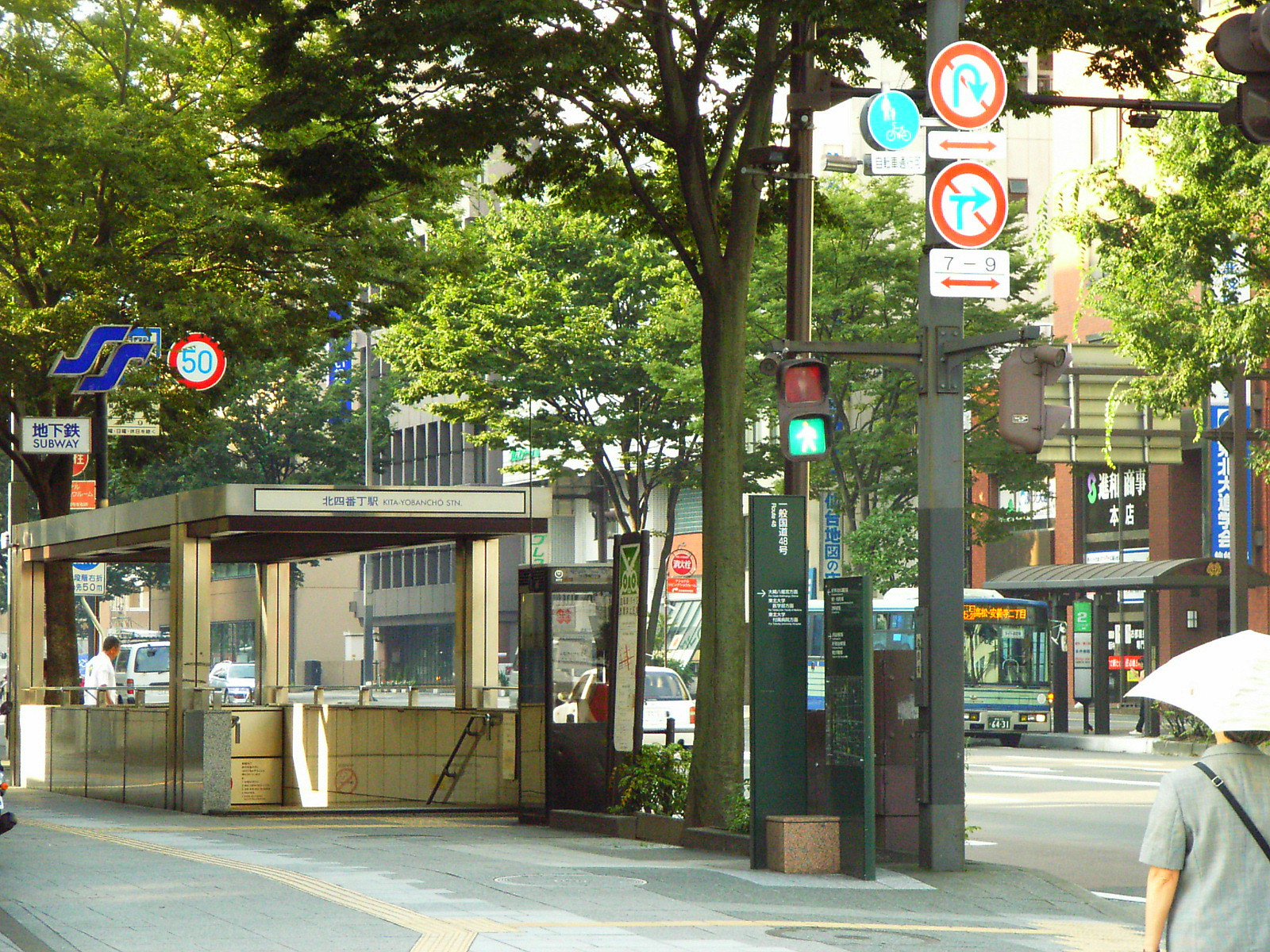
- Kita-Yobanchō Station in September 2005

General information
- Location: 1-17 Kamisugi, Aoba-ku, Sendai-shi, Miyagi-ken 980-0011; Japan
- Coordinates: 38°16′20″N 140°52′08″E
- System: Sendai Subway station
- Operator: Sendai City Transportation Bureau
- Line: Namboku Line
- Distance: 6.6 km (4.1 mi) from Izumi-Chūō
- Platforms: 1 island platform
- Tracks: 2
- Connections: Bus stop

Other information
- Status: Staffed
- Station code: N07
- Website: Official website

History
- Opened: 15 July 1987; 39 years ago

Passengers
- FY 2015 (Daily): 7,787

Services
Preceding station	Sendai Subway	Following station
Kōtōdai-Kōen N08 towards Tomizawa	Namboku Line	Kita-Sendai N06 towards Izumi-Chūō
Location
- Location within Miyagi Prefecture Location within Japan

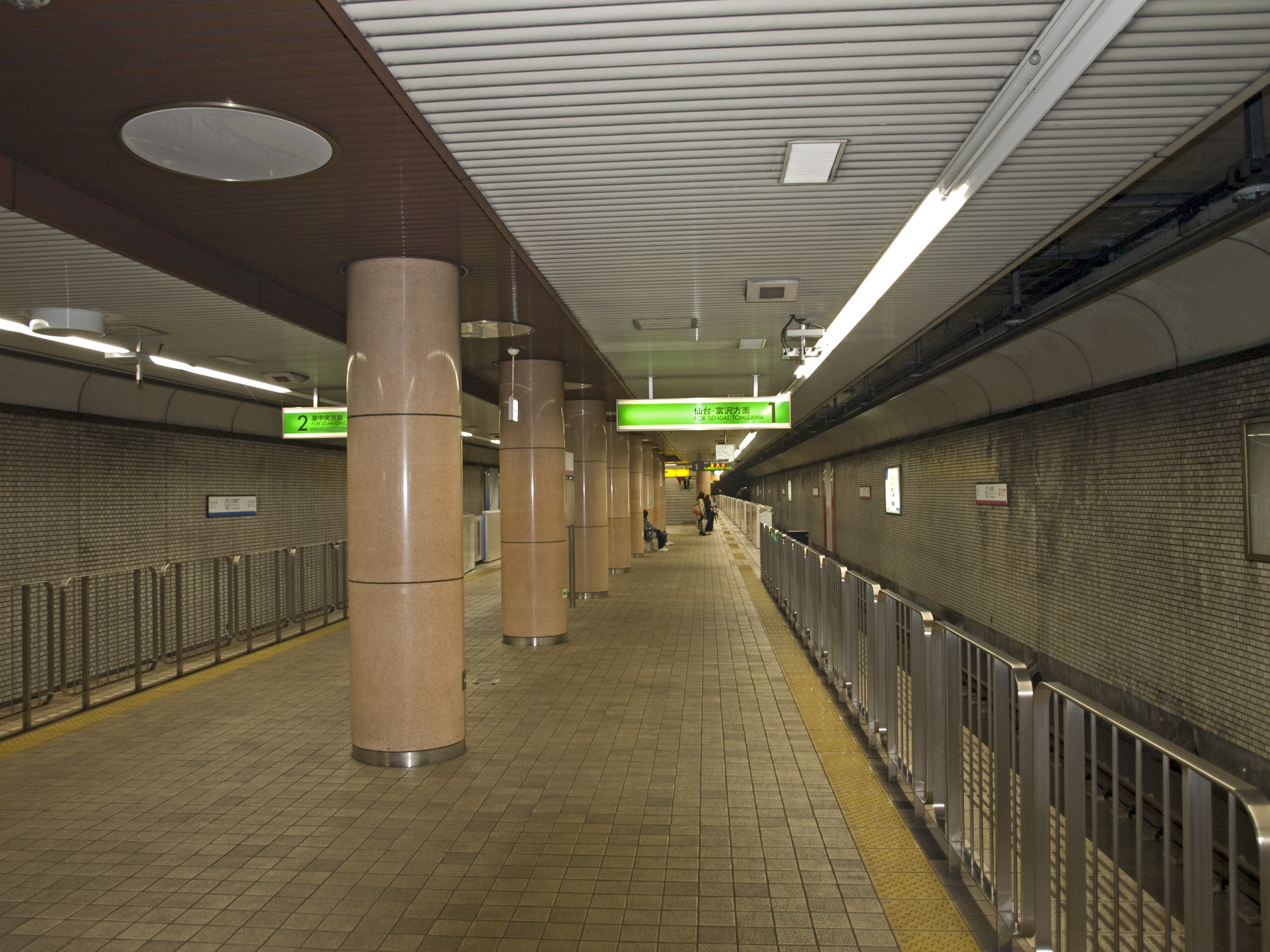
The platforms in October 2015

Kita-Yobanchō Station (北四番丁駅, Kita-Yobanchō eki) is an underground metro station on the Sendai Subway Namboku Line in Aoba-ku, Sendai, Miyagi Prefecture, Japan.

== Lines ==
Kita-Yobanchō Station is served by the Sendai Subway Namboku Line and is located 6.6 rail kilometers from the terminus of the line at Izumi-Chūō.

== Station layout ==
Kita-Yobanchō Station is an underground station with a single island platform serving two tracks.

=== Platforms ===
1	■ Namboku Line	■ for Sendai, Tomizawa
2	■ Namboku Line	■ for Izumi-Chūō

== History ==
Kita-Yobanchō Station was opened on 15 July 1987. Operations were suspended from 11 March 2011 to 29 April 2012 due to damage sustained by the 2011 Tōhoku earthquake and tsunami.

== Passenger statistics ==
In fiscal 2015, the station was used by an average of 7,787 passengers daily.

== Surrounding area ==
- Sendai Television Broadcasting
- Sendai Kashiwagi Post Office
