= Sendai Seiyo Gakuin Junior College =

- 仙台青葉学院短期大学
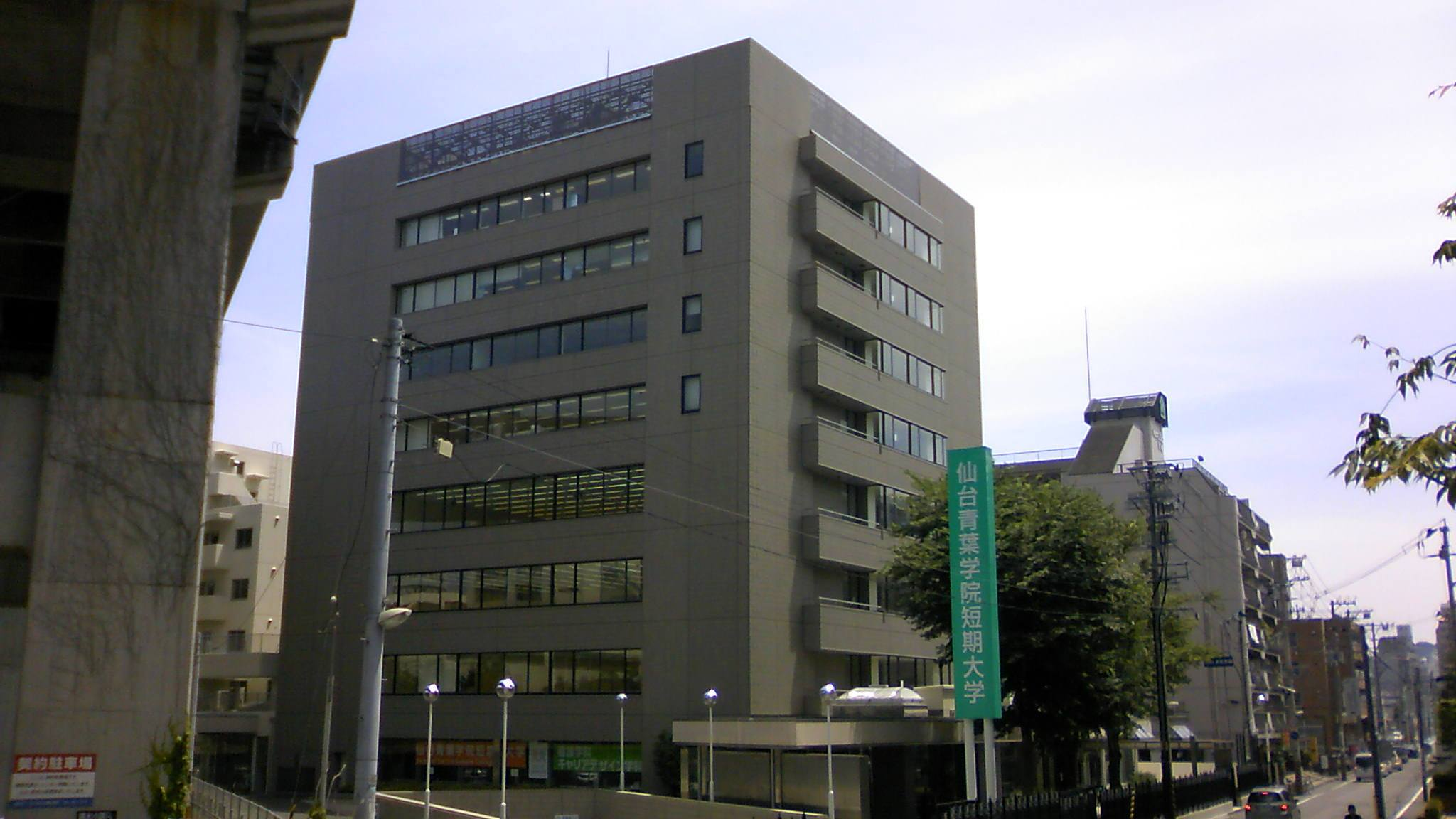
- Sendai Seiyo Gakuin Junior College Aoba-ku Campus
- Type: Private
- Established: 2009
- Location: Sendai, Miyagi Prefecture, Japan
- Campus: Itsutsubashi 38°15′12.3″N 140°53′1.3″E Nagamachi 38°13′47.8″N 140°52′53.7″E
- Website: http://www.Seiyogakuin.ac.jp/

Sendai Seiyo Gakuin Junior College (仙台青葉学院短期大学, Sendai Seiyo Gakuin Tanki Daigaku) is a junior college in Sendai Miyagi Prefecture, Japan, chartered in 2009. The school has three locations:

- Itsutsubashi campus, Wakabayashi-ku, Sendai
- Nagamichi campus, Taihaku-ku, Sendai
- Central campus, Aoba-ku, Sendai

== History ==
The school was founded by Hokuto Gakuen (北杜学園) as a vocational school in 1980. It was chartered as a junior college in 2009. In 2013, two new academic departments were established: rehabilitation (including physical therapy and occupational therapy) and child studies.

== Academic departments ==
- Department of Nursing
- Department of Business
- Department of Child Care
- Department of Rehabilitation
  - Physical Therapy Department
  - Occupational Therapy Department
- Dental Hygiene Department
