= Kōtōdai-Kōen Station =

Metro station in Sendai, Japan

N08 Kōtōdai-Kōen Station 勾当台公園駅
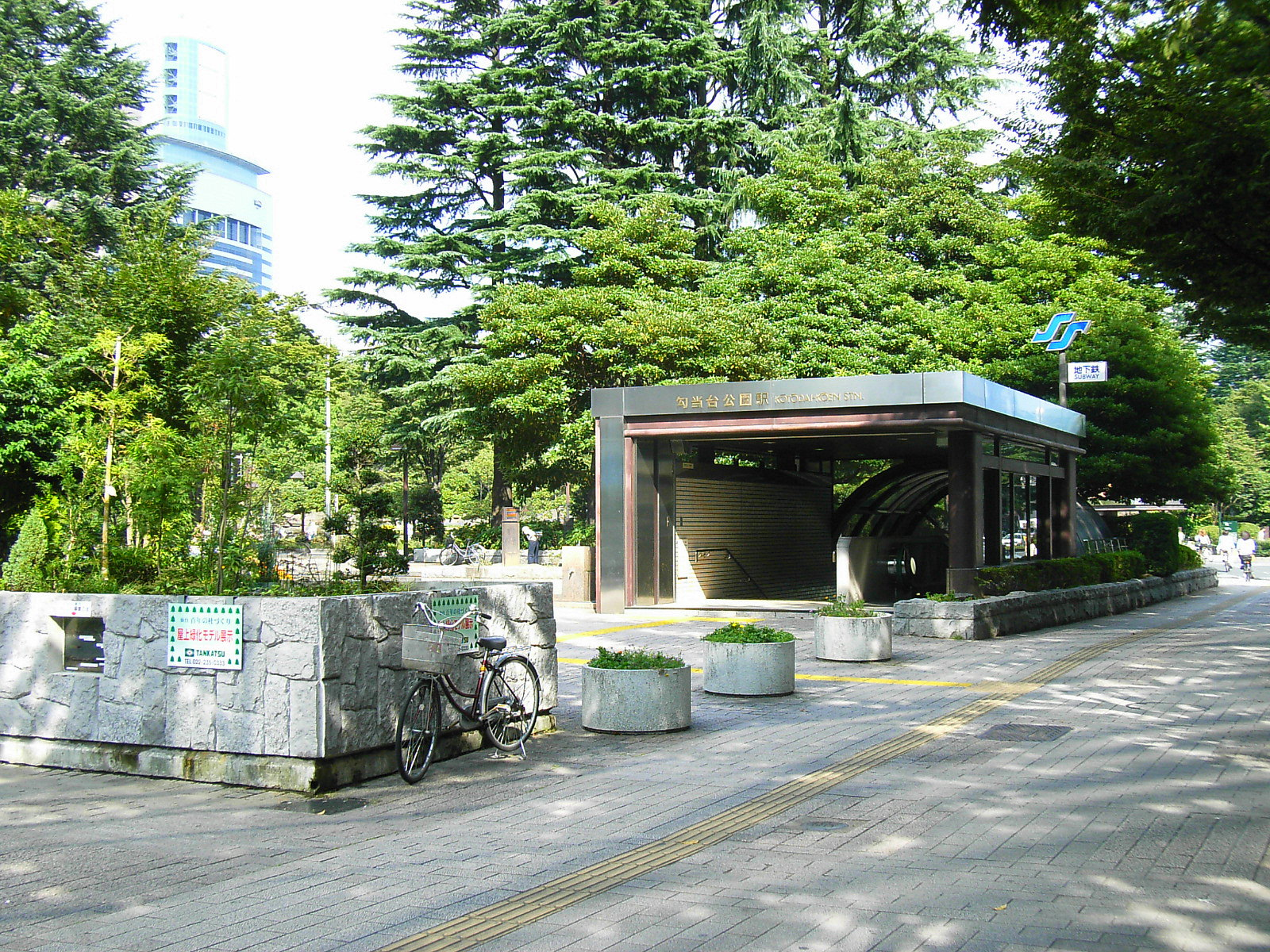
- Kōtōdai-Kōen Station

General information
- Location: 3-9-2 Honchō, Aoba-ku, Sendai-shi, Miyagi-ken 980-0014; Japan
- Coordinates: 38°15′59″N 140°52′17″E
- System: Sendai Subway station
- Operator: Sendai City Transportation Bureau
- Line: Namboku Line
- Distance: 7.3 km (4.5 mi) from Izumi-Chūō
- Platforms: 1 island platform
- Connections: Bus stop

Other information
- Status: Staffed
- Station code: N08
- Website: Official website

History
- Opened: 15 July 1987; 39 years ago

Passengers
- FY 2015 (Daily): 15,138

Services
Preceding station	Sendai Subway	Following station
Hirose-dōri N09 towards Tomizawa	Namboku Line	Kita-Yobanchō N07 towards Izumi-Chūō
Location
- Location within Miyagi Prefecture Location within Japan

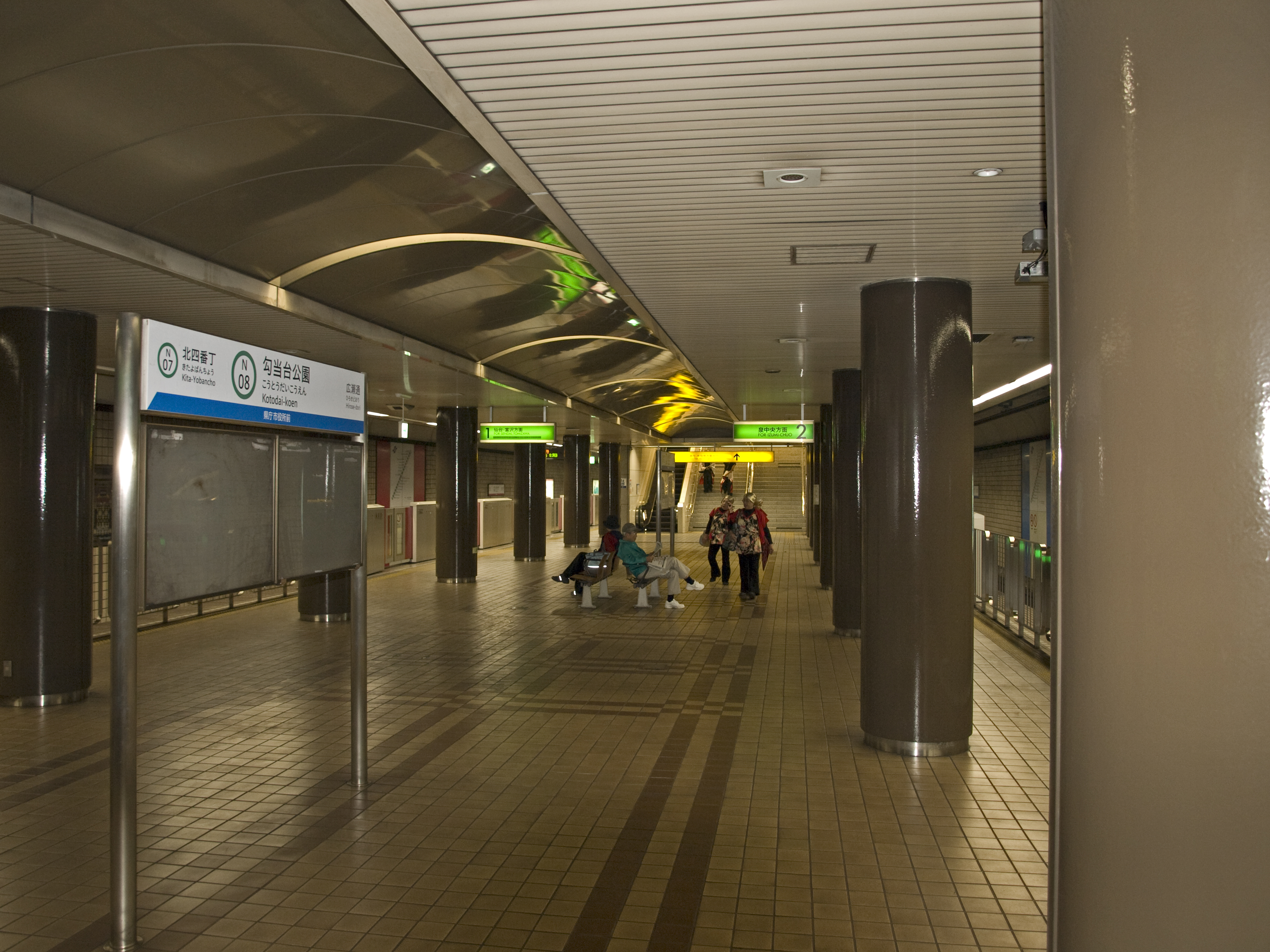
Station platforms

Kōtōdai-Kōen Station (勾当台公園駅, Kōtōdai-Kōen eki) is an underground metro station on the Sendai Subway Namboku Line in Aoba-ku, Sendai, Miyagi Prefecture, Japan.

== Lines ==
Kōtōdai-Kōen Station is on the Sendai Subway Namboku Line and is located 7.3 rail kilometers from the terminus of the line at Izumi-Chūō.

== Station layout ==
Kōtōdai-Kōen Station is an underground station with a single island platform serving two tracks.

=== Platforms ===
1	■ Namboku Line	■ for Sendai, Tomizawa
2	■ Namboku Line	■ for Izumi-Chūō

== History ==
Kōtōdai-Kōen Station was opened on 15 July 1987. Operations were suspended from 11 March 2011 to 29 April 2012 due to damage sustained by the 2011 Tōhoku earthquake and tsunami.

== Passenger statistics ==
In fiscal 2015, the station was used by an average of 15,138 passengers daily.

== Surrounding area ==
- Sendai Municipal Office
- Aoba Ward Office
- Miyagi Prefectural Office
