= Atagobashi Station =

Metro station in Sendai, Japan

N12 Atagobashi Station 愛宕橋駅
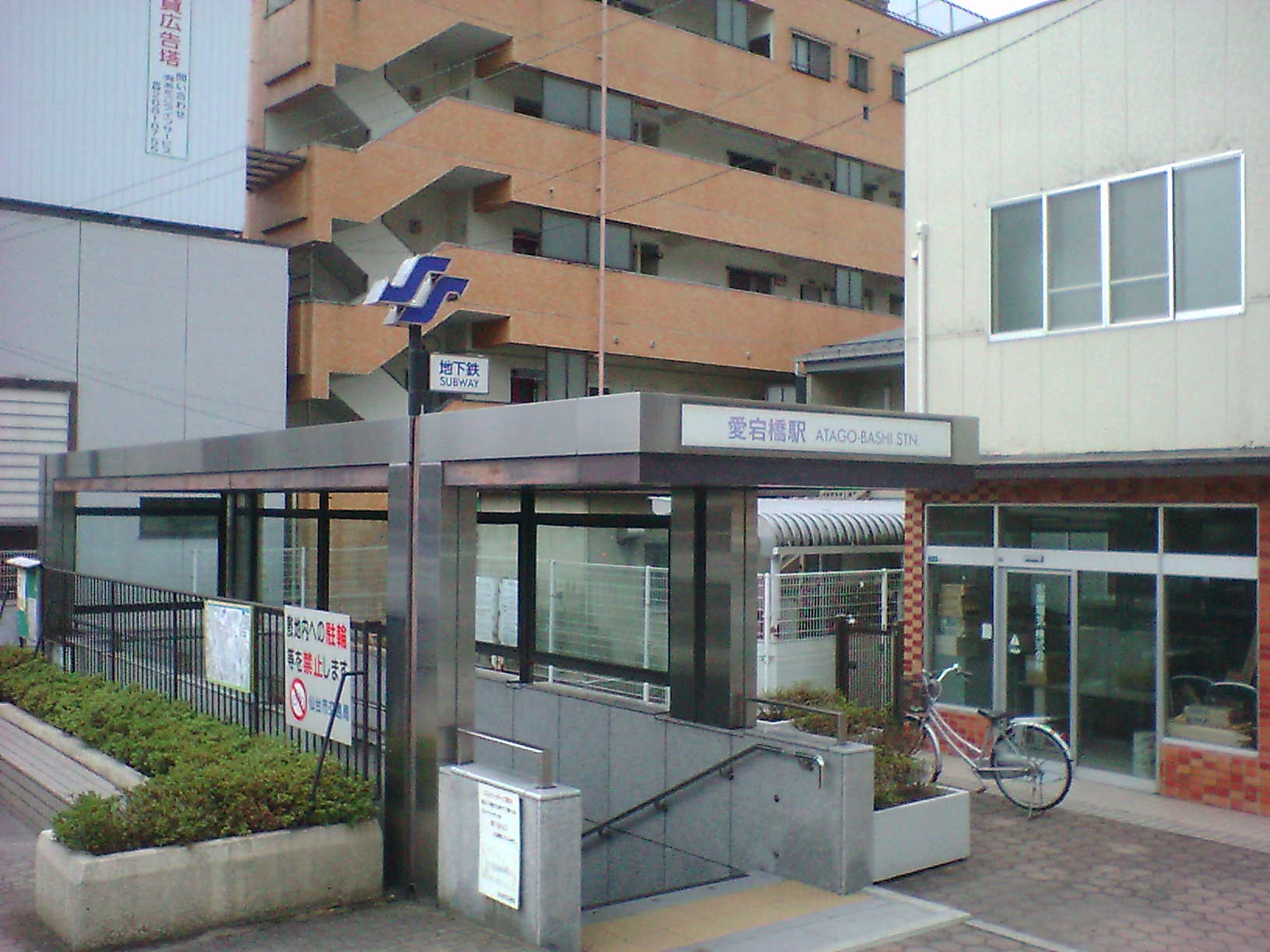
- Atagobashi Station in October 2005

General information
- Location: Tsuchitoi, Wakabayashi-ku, Sendai-shi, Miyagi-ken 984-0065; Japan
- Coordinates: 38°14′51″N 140°52′54″E
- System: Sendai Subway station
- Operator: Sendai City Transportation Bureau
- Line: Namboku Line
- Distance: 10.0 km (6.2 mi) from Izumi-Chūō
- Platforms: 1 island platform
- Connections: Bus stop

Other information
- Status: Staffed
- Station code: N12
- Website: Official website

History
- Opened: 15 July 1987; 39 years ago

Passengers
- FY2015 (Daily): 2,242

Services
Preceding station	Sendai Subway	Following station
Kawaramachi N13 towards Tomizawa	Namboku Line	Itsutsubashi N11 towards Izumi-Chūō
Location
- Location within Miyagi Prefecture Location within Japan

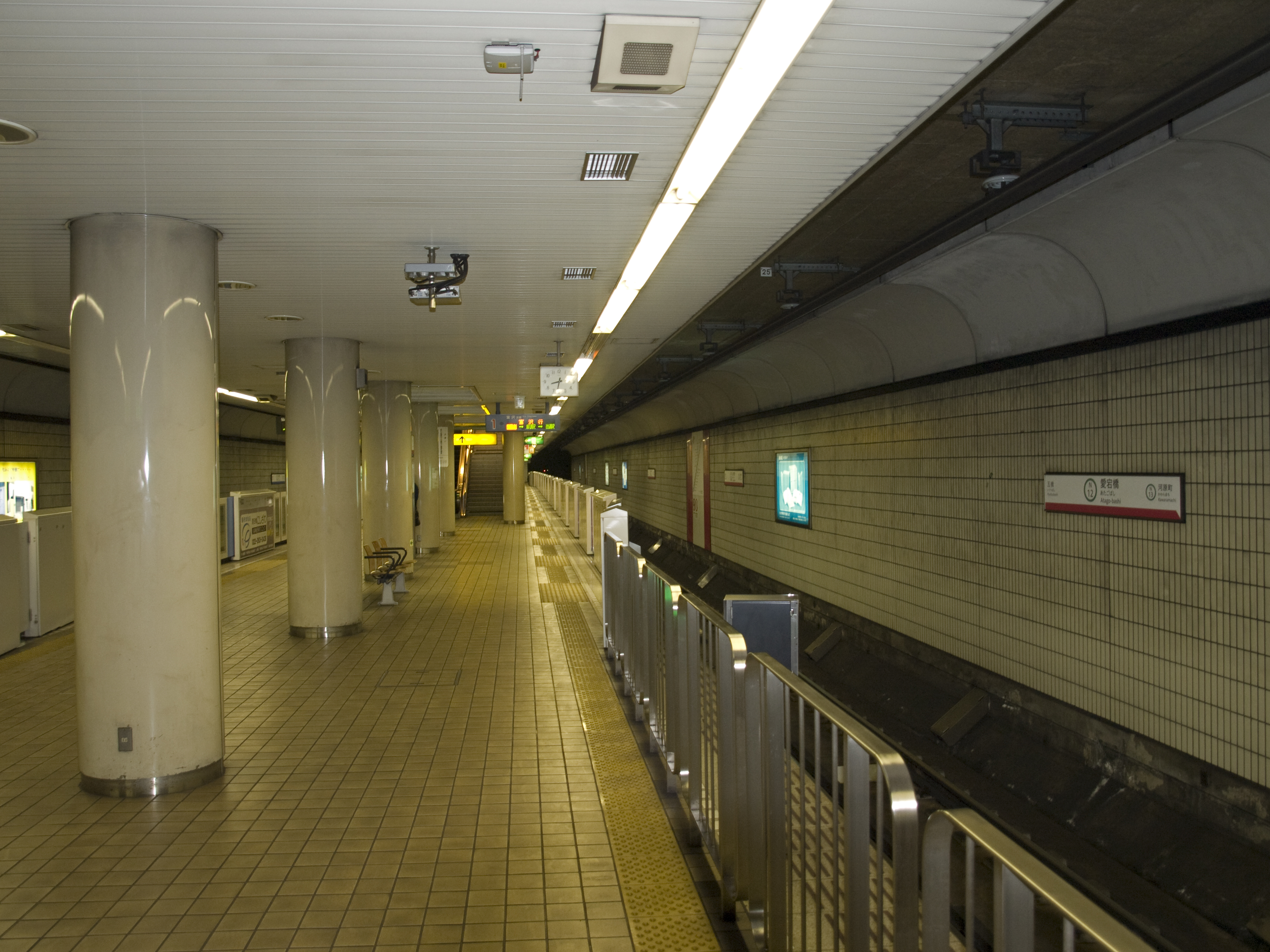
The platforms

Atagobashi Station (愛宕橋駅, Atagobashi eki) is an underground metro station on the Sendai Subway Namboku Line in Wakabayashi-ku, Sendai, Miyagi Prefecture, Japan.

== Lines ==
Atagobashi Station is on the Sendai Subway Namboku Line and is located 10.0 rail kilometers from the terminus of the line at Izumi-Chūō.

== Station layout ==
Atagobashi Station is an underground station with a single island platform serving two tracks.

=== Platforms ===
1	■ Namboku Line (Sendai)	■ for Tomizawa
2	■ Namboku Line (Sendai)	■ for Sendai, Izumi-Chūō

== History ==
Atagobashi Station opened on 15 July 1987.

== Passenger statistics ==
In fiscal 2015, the station was used by an average of 2,042 passengers daily.

== Surrounding area ==
- Japan National Route 4
- Atagobashi Bridge
- Atagobashi Shrine
