= Yaotome Station =

Metro station in Sendai, Japan

N02 Yaotome Station 八乙女駅
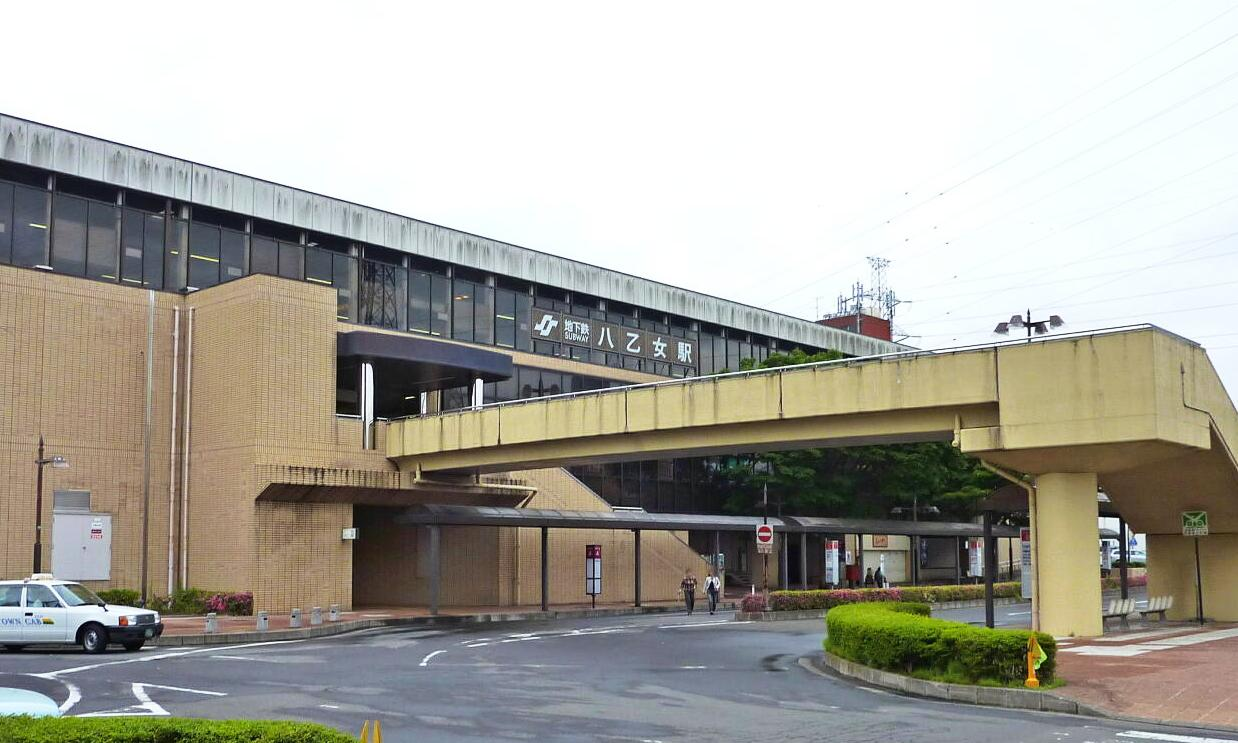
- Yaotome Station

General information
- Location: 4-10, Yaotomechūō 1-chōme, Izumi-ku, Sendai-shi, Miyagi-ken 981-3135; Japan
- Coordinates: 38°18′46″N 140°53′03″E
- System: Sendai Subway station
- Operator: Sendai City Transportation Bureau
- Line: Namboku Line
- Distance: 1.3 km (0.81 mi) from Izumi-Chūō
- Platforms: 1 island platform
- Connections: Bus stop

Other information
- Status: Staffed
- Station code: N02
- Website: Official website

History
- Opened: 15 July 1987; 39 years ago

Passengers
- Daily (FY2015): 7,857

Services
Preceding station	Sendai Subway	Following station
Kuromatsu N03 towards Tomizawa	Namboku Line	Izumi-Chūō N01 Terminus
Location
- Location within Miyagi Prefecture Location within Japan

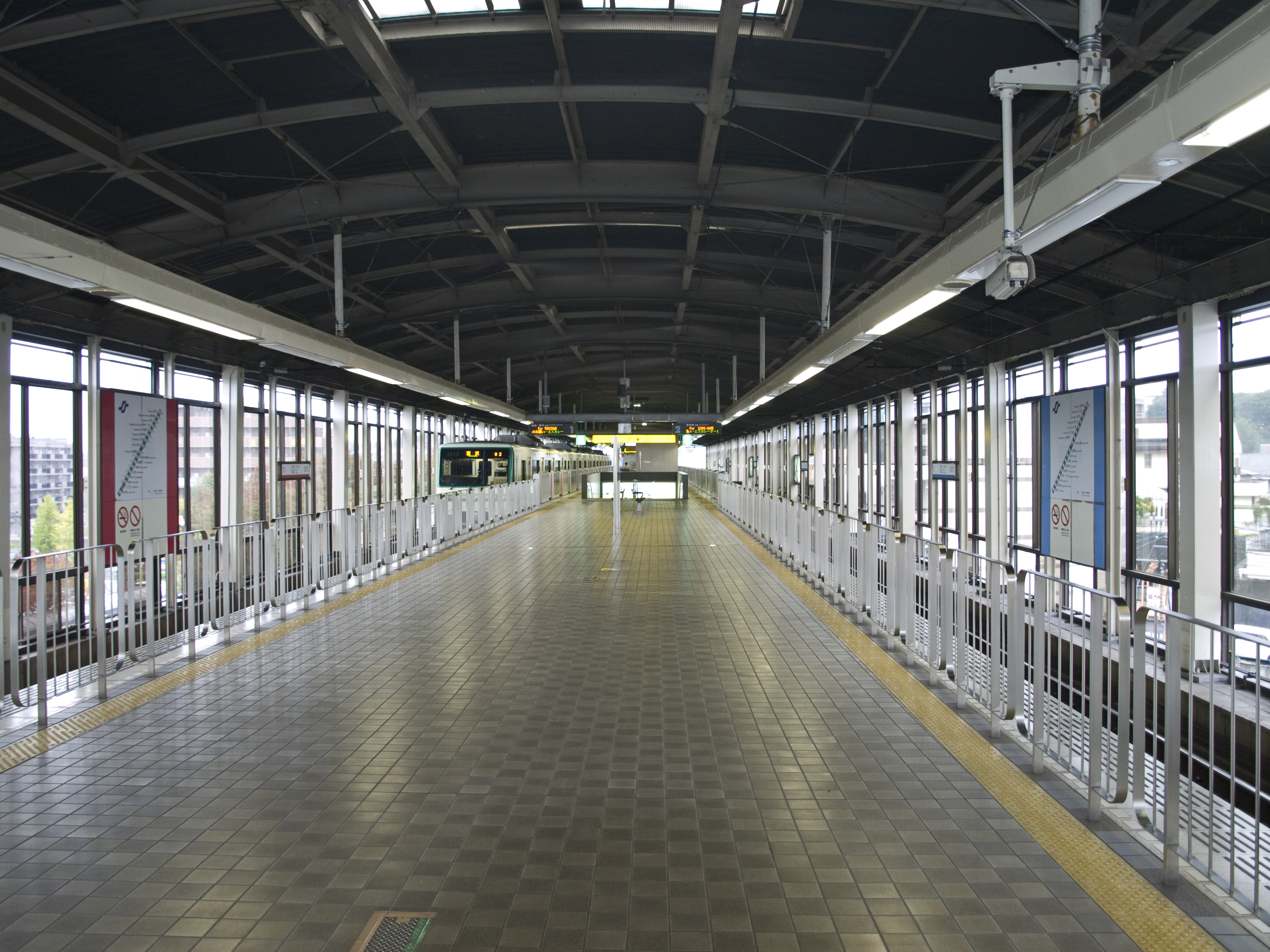
The platforms

Yaotome Station (八乙女駅, Yaotome eki) is a metro station on the Sendai Subway Namboku Line in Izumi-ku, Sendai, Miyagi Prefecture, Japan.

== Lines ==
Yaotome is on the Sendai Subway Namboku Line and is located 1.3 rail kilometers from the terminus of the line at Izumi-Chūō.

== Station layout ==
Yaotome Station is an elevated station with a single island platform serving two tracks on the third floor of the station building, with a concourse and ticketing facilities and wicket gates underneath.

=== Platforms ===
1	■ Namboku Line	■ for Sendai, Tomizawa
2	■ Namboku Line	■ for Izumi-Chūō

== History ==
Yaotomo Station was opened on 15 July 1987. Operations were temporarily halted from 11 March to 29 April 2011 due to the effects of the 2011 Tōhoku earthquake and tsunami.

== Passenger statistics ==
In fiscal 2015, the station was used by an average of 7,857 passengers daily.

== Surrounding area ==
- Izumi-Yaotome Post Office
