= Hirose-dōri Station =

Metro station in Sendai, Japan

N09 Hirose-dōri Station 広瀬通駅
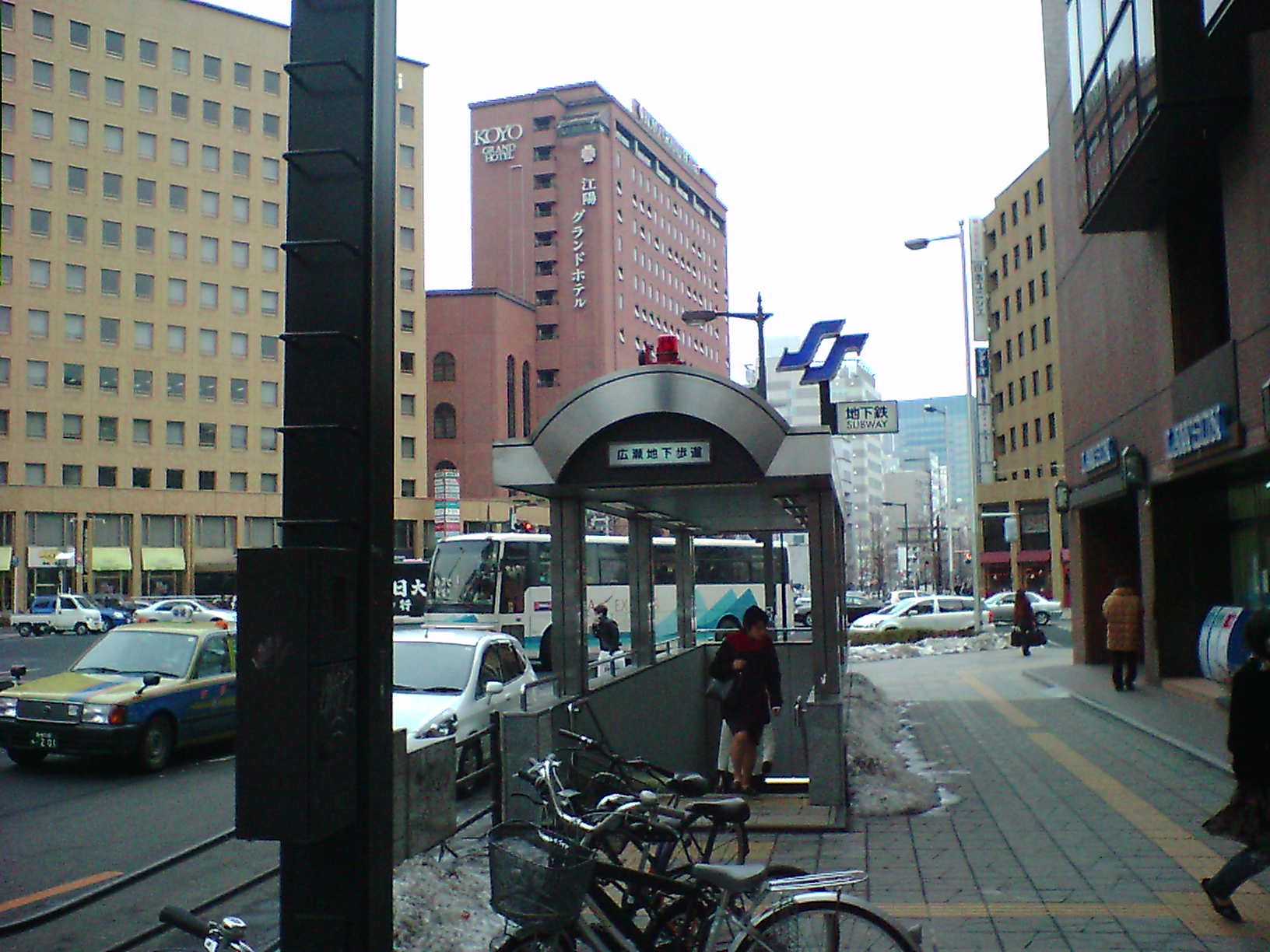
- Hirose-dōri Station

General information
- Location: 2-10 Chūō, Aoba-ku, Sendai-shi, Miyagi-ken 980-0021; Japan
- Coordinates: 38°15′46″N 140°52′33″E
- System: Sendai Subway station
- Operator: Sendai City Transportation Bureau
- Line: Sendai Subway station
- Distance: 7.9 km (4.9 mi) from Izumi-Chūō
- Platforms: 1 island platform
- Connections: Bus stop

Other information
- Status: Staffed
- Station code: N09
- Website: Official website

History
- Opened: 15 July 1987; 39 years ago

Passengers
- FY 2015: 10,672 daily

Services
Preceding station	Sendai Subway	Following station
Sendai N10 towards Tomizawa	Namboku Line	Kōtōdai-Kōen N08 towards Izumi-Chūō
Location
- Location within Miyagi Prefecture Location within Japan

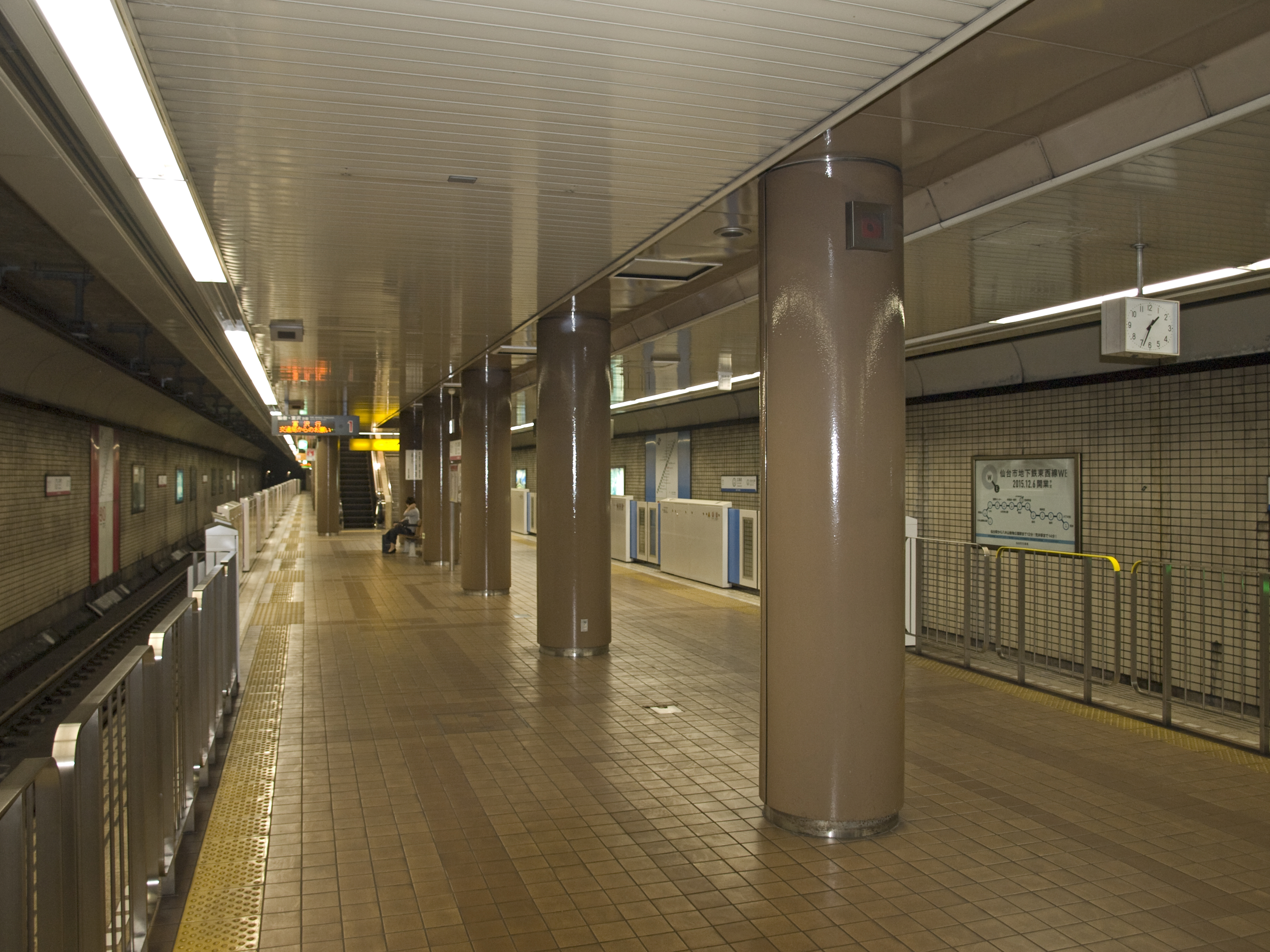
The platforms

Hirose-dōri Station (広瀬通駅, Hirose-dōri eki) is an underground metro station on the Sendai Subway Namboku Line in Aoba-ku, Sendai, Miyagi Prefecture, Japan

== Lines ==
Hirose-dōri Station is on the Sendai Subway Namboku Line and is located 7.9 rail kilometers from the terminus of the line at Izumi-Chūō.

== Station layout ==
Hirose-dōri Station is an underground station with a single island platform serving two tracks.

=== Platforms ===
1	■ Namboku Line	■ for Sendai, Tomizawa
2	■ Namboku Line	■ for Izumi-Chūō

== History ==
Hirose-dōri Station opened on 15 July 1987. Operations were suspended from 11 March 2011 to 29 April 2012 due to damage sustained by the 2011 Tōhoku earthquake and tsunami.

== Passenger statistics ==
In fiscal 2015, the station was used by an average of 10,672 passengers daily.

== Surrounding area ==
- Clis Road Shopping District
- Sendai City Hirose Post Office
- Sendai City Gas Bureau Showroom
- Tohoku Electric Power headquarters
- FM Sendai Head office

In addition, the area around the station is a commercial district, with many restaurants and shopping opportunities.
