= Botanical Garden of Tohoku University =

Botanical garden in Sendai, Japan

Botanical Garden of Tohoku University 東北大学植物園
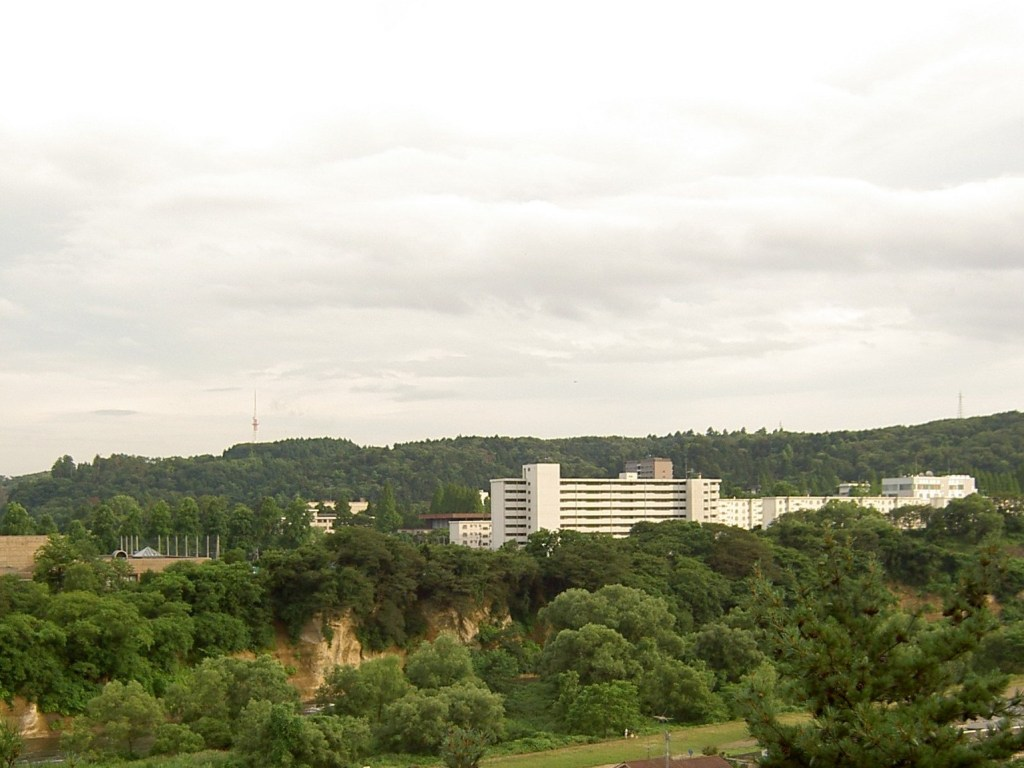
- Botanical Garden of Tohoku University
- Interactive map of Botanical Garden of Tohoku University 東北大学植物園
- Type: Public
- Location: Aoba-ku, Sendai, Japan
- Coordinates: 38.2558°N 140.8516°E
- Created: 1958

The Botanical Garden of Tohoku University (東北大学植物園, Tōhoku Daigaku Shokubutsuen; 490,000 m^{2}) is a botanical garden operated by Tohoku University at Kawauchi 12-2, Aoba-ku, Sendai, Miyagi Prefecture, Japan. It is open daily.

The garden was established in 1958. It now includes more than 800 species, with a particular focus on willows and alpine plants, as well as collections of Cactaceae and other succulents, Iris, Lilium, Paeonia, Rosa, Syringa, and conifers such as Podocarpus. Specific species include Belamcanda chinensis, Caltha palustris var. nipponica, Carex podogyna, Lysichiton camtschatcense, Menyanthes trifoliata, Myrica gale var. tomentosa, Potamogeton distinctus, and Primula japonica.

== See also ==
- List of botanical gardens in Japan
