= Tohoku Medical and Pharmaceutical University =

Coordinates: 38°17′6.3″N 140°53′4.9″E

- 東北医科薬科大学
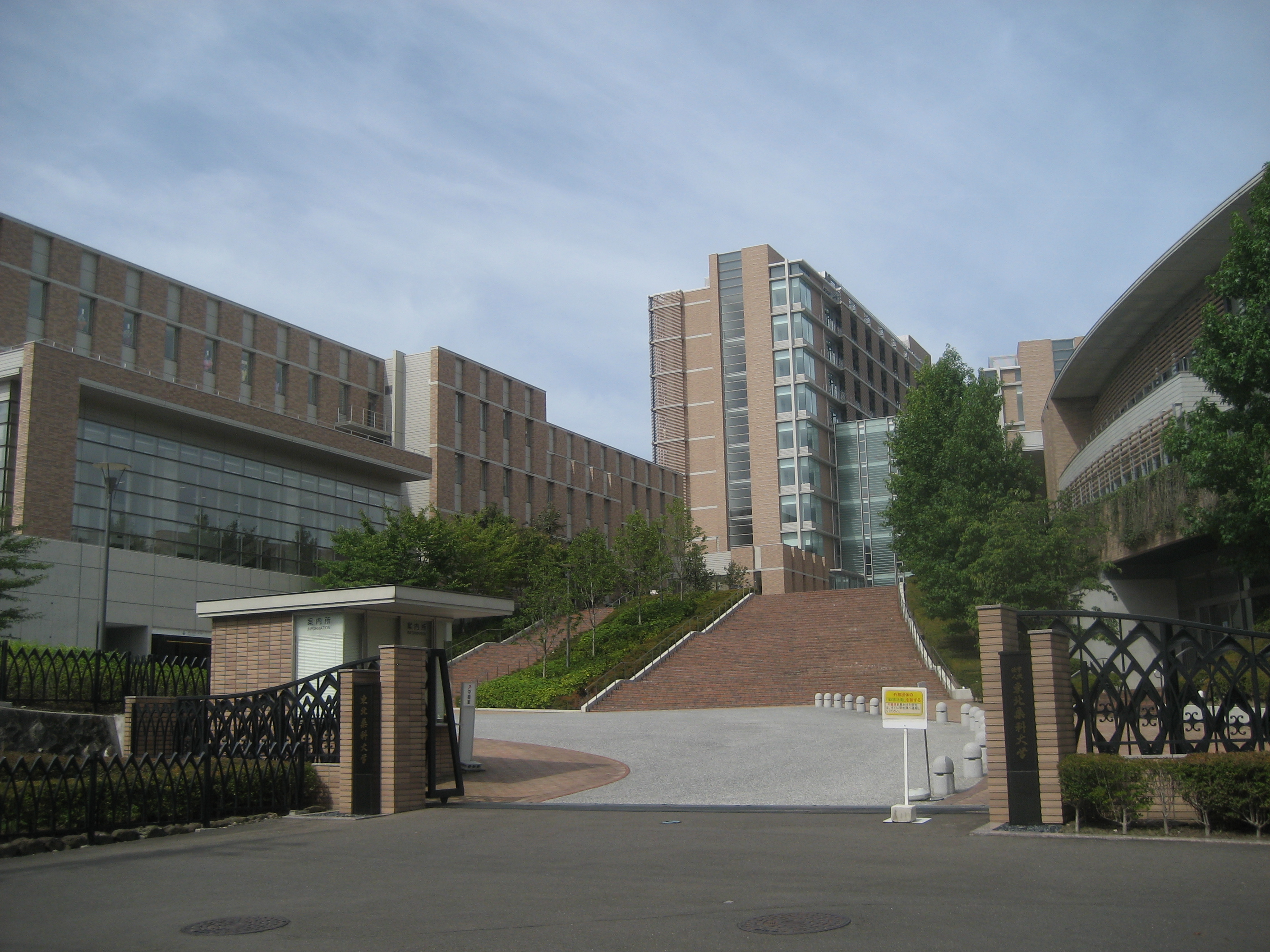
- Type: Private
- Established: 1939
- Location: Aoba-ku, Sendai, Miyagi Prefecture, Japan
- Website: http://www.tohoku-mpu.ac.jp

Tohoku Medical and Pharmaceutical University (東北医科薬科大学, Tōhoku ika yakka daigaku) is a private university in Aoba-ku, Sendai, Miyagi Prefecture, Japan.

== History ==
The Tohoku Pharmaceutical University (東北薬科大学, Tōhoku yakka daigaku) was established in 1949, based on the Tohoku Pharmaceutical College, which was established in 1939.

In 1959, it became the first cancer research institute established at a private pharmaceutical university in Japan. In 1962 it became the first graduate school at the private pharmacy college. With the establishment of a Medical Department in 2015, the university became Tohoku Medical and Pharmaceutical University (東北医科薬科大学, Tōhoku ika yakka daigaku).
