= Asahigaoka Station (Miyagi) =

Metro station in Sendai, Japan

N04 Asahigaoka Station 旭ヶ丘駅
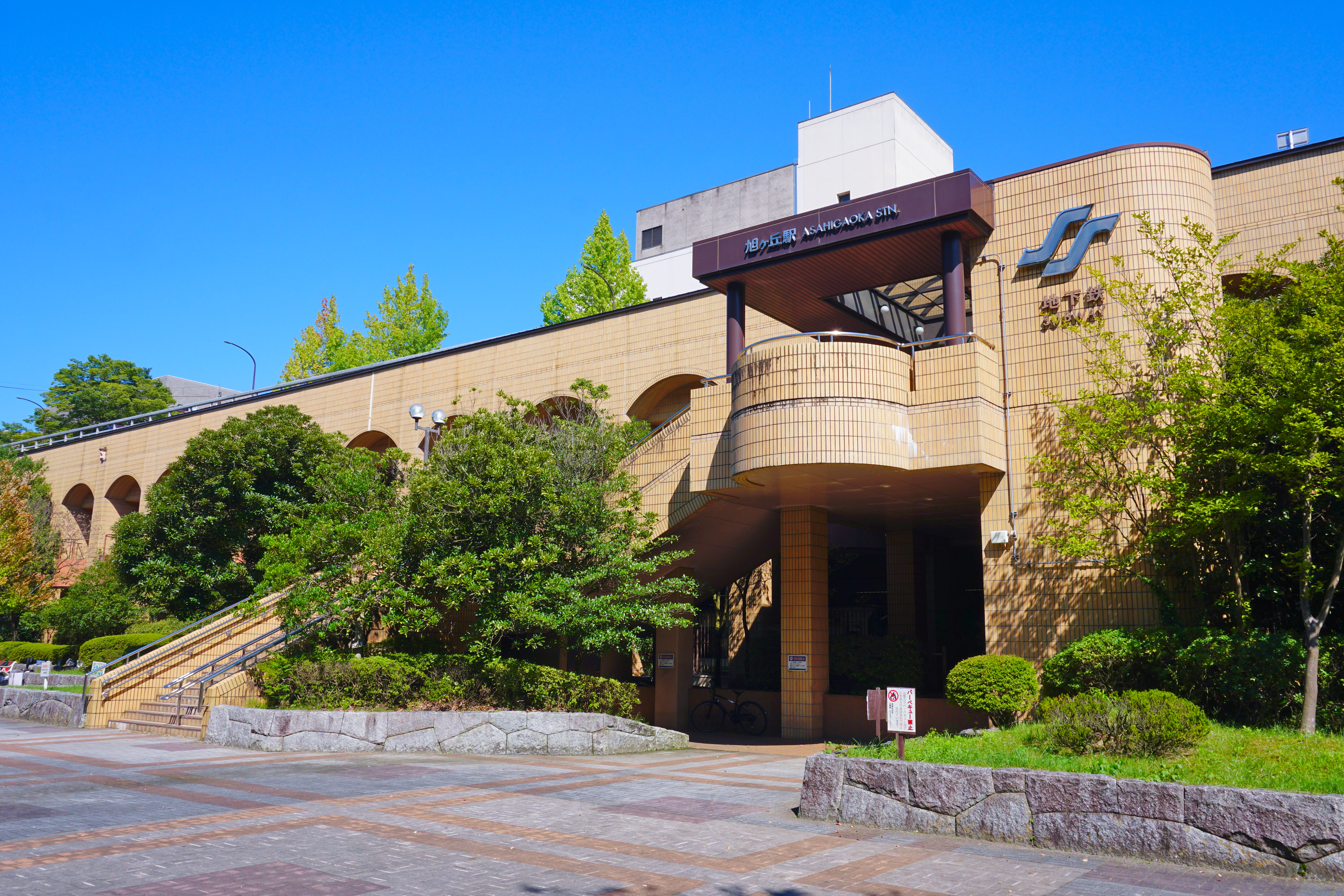
- Asahigaoka Station in September 2022

General information
- Location: 25-15, Asahigaoka 3-chome, Aoba-ku, Sendai-shi, Miyagi-ken 981-0904; Japan
- Coordinates: 38°17′43″N 140°53′01″E
- System: Sendai Subway station
- Operator: Sendai City Transportation Bureau
- Line: Namboku Line
- Distance: 3.3 km (2.1 mi) from Izumi-Chūō
- Platforms: 1 island platform
- Tracks: 2
- Connections: Bus stop

Other information
- Status: Staffed
- Station code: N04
- Website: Official website

History
- Opened: 15 July 1987; 39 years ago

Passengers
- Daily (FY2015): 6,839

Services
Preceding station	Sendai Subway	Following station
Dainohara N05 towards Tomizawa	Namboku Line	Kuromatsu N03 towards Izumi-Chūō
Location
- Location within Japan

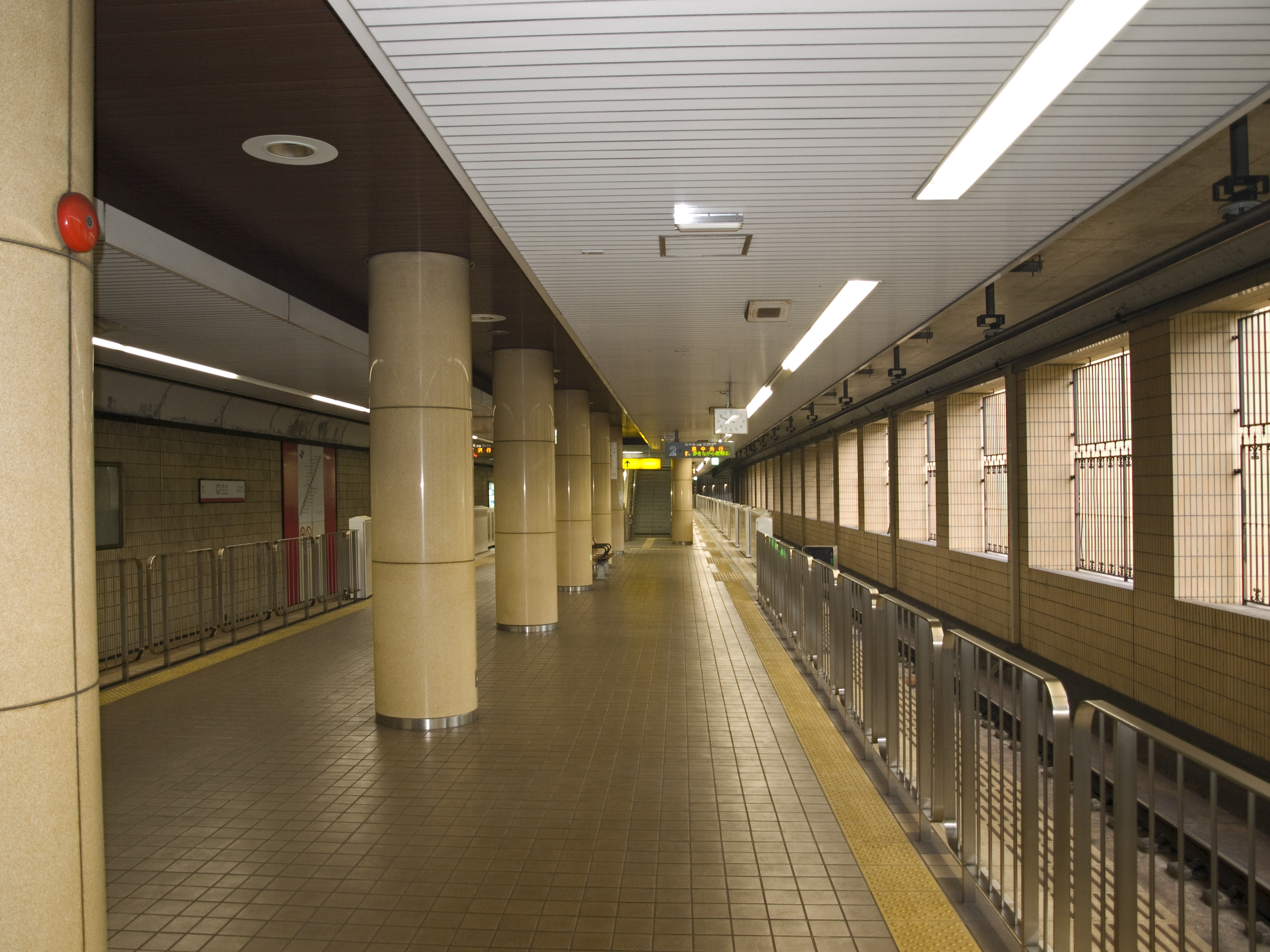
The platforms

Asahigaoka Station (旭ヶ丘駅, Asahigaoka eki) is a subway station on the Sendai Subway Namboku Line in Aoba-ku, Sendai, Miyagi Prefecture, Japan.

== Lines ==
Asahigaoka Station is on the Sendai Subway Namboku Line and is located 3.3 kilometers from the terminus of the line at Izumi-Chūō.

== Station layout ==
Asahigaoka Station is an underground station with a single island platform serving two tracks.

=== Platforms ===
1	■ Namboku Line	■ for Sendai, Tomizawa
2	■ Nanboku Line	■ for Izumi-Chūō

== History ==
Asahigaoka Station was opened on 15 July 1987. Operations were suspended from 11 March 2011 to 29 April 2012 due to damage sustained by the 2011 Tōhoku earthquake and tsunami.

== Passenger statistics ==
In fiscal 2015, the station was used by an average of 6,839 passengers daily.

== Surrounding area ==
- Sendai Science Museum
- Dainohara Forest Park
- Sendai Youth Culture Center
- Sendai-Kita Post Office
- Sendai Dainohara Post Office
- Asahigaoka and Nankodai residential districts

== See also ==
- List of railway stations in Japan
