= Dainohara Station =

Metro station in Sendai, Japan

N05 Dainohara Station 台原駅
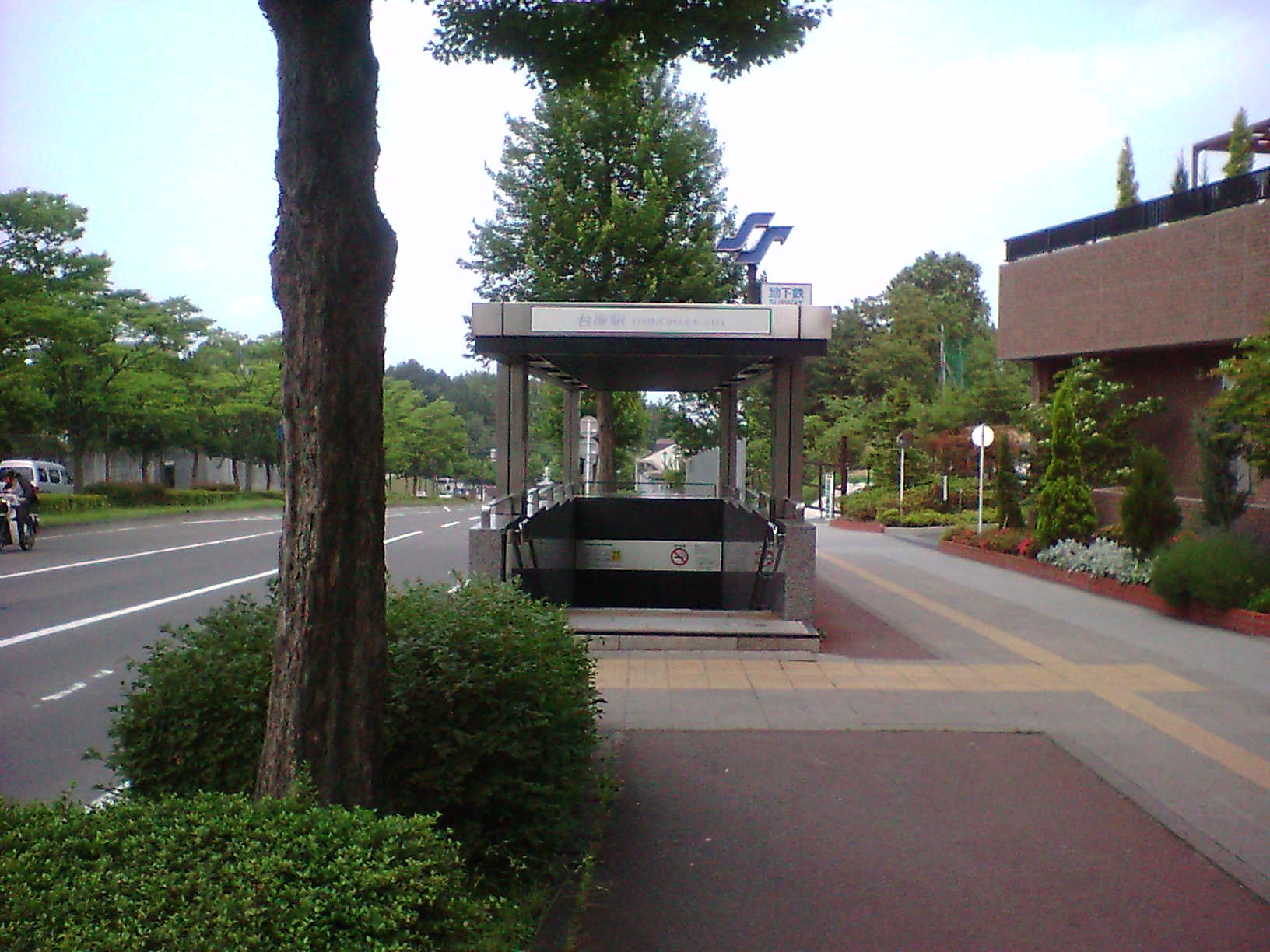
- Dainohara Station

General information
- Location: 1-1 Dainohara-shinrinkōen, Aoba-ku, Sendai-shi, Miyagi-ken 981-0903; Japan
- Coordinates: 38°17′18″N 140°52′43″E
- System: Sendai Subway station
- Operator: Sendai City Transportation Bureau
- Line: Namboku Line
- Distance: 4.3 km (2.7 mi) from Izumi-Chūō
- Platforms: 1 island platform
- Tracks: 2
- Connections: Bus stop

Other information
- Status: Staffed
- Station code: N05
- Website: Official website

History
- Opened: 15 July 1987; 39 years ago

Passengers
- FY2015 (Daily): 5,768

Services
Preceding station	Sendai Subway	Following station
Kita-Sendai N06 towards Tomizawa	Namboku Line	Asahigaoka N04 towards Izumi-Chūō
Location
- Location within Miyagi Prefecture Location within Japan

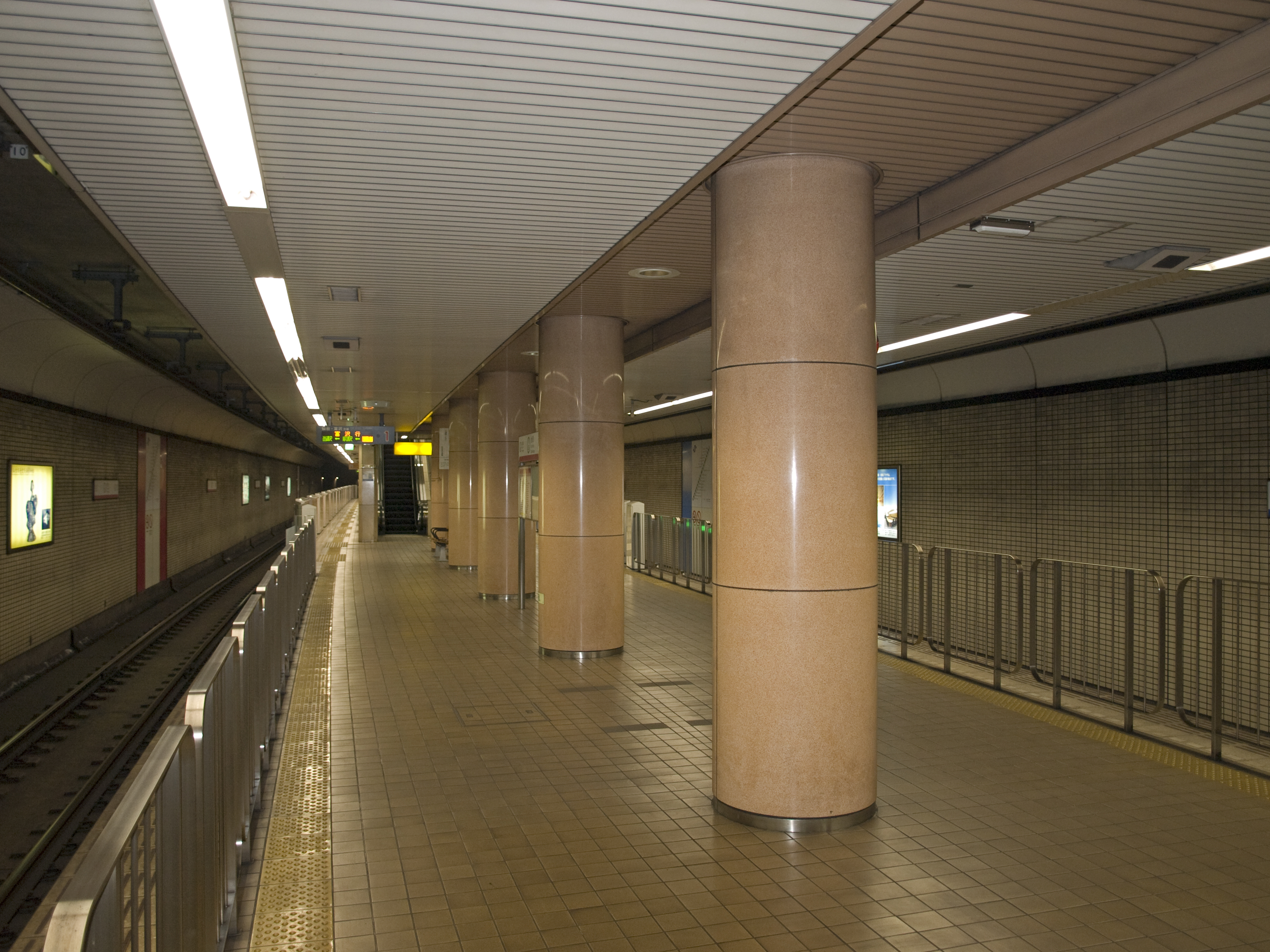
The platforms

Dainohara Station (台原駅, Dainohara eki) is a subway station on the Sendai Subway Namboku Line in Aoba-ku, Sendai, Miyagi Prefecture, Japan.

== Lines ==
Dainohara Station is on the Sendai Subway Namboku Line and is located 4.3 kilometers from the terminus of the line at Izumi-Chūō .

== Station layout ==
Dainohara Station is an underground station with a single island platform serving two tracks.

=== Platforms ===
1	■ Namboku Line (Sendai)	■ for Sendai, Tomizawa
2	■ Namboku Line (Sendai)	■ for Izumi-Chūō

== History ==
Dainohara Station was opened on 15 July 1987. Operations were suspended from 11 March 2011 to 29 April 2012 due to damage sustained by the 2011 Tōhoku earthquake and tsunami.

== Passenger statistics ==
In fiscal 2015, the station was used by an average of 5,768 passengers daily.

== Surrounding area ==
- Komatsushima Park
- Dainohara Woods Village Park
- Sendai City Literature Museum
- Tohoku Labour Disaster Hospital
- Sendai-Kita Post Office
- Sendai Dainohara Post Office

== See also ==
- List of railway stations in Japan
