= Kuromatsu Station (Miyagi) =

Metro station in Sendai, Japan

N03 Kuromatsu Station 黒松駅
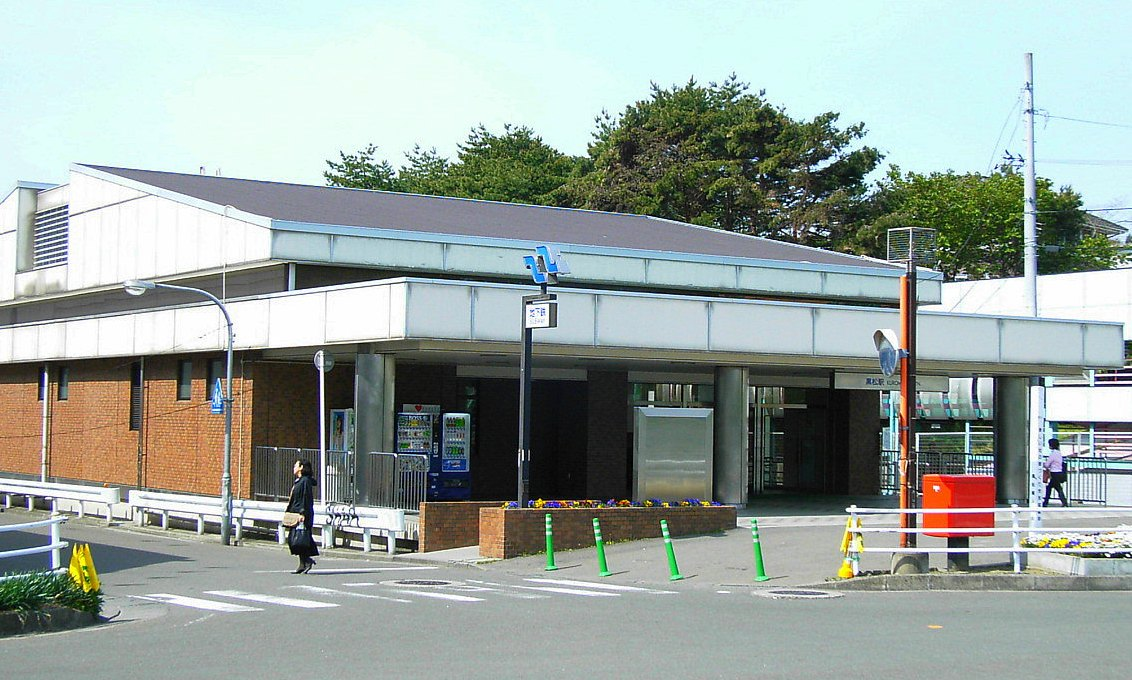
- Kuromatsu Station

General information
- Location: 22-1, Asahigaokatsutsumi 2-chōme, Izumi-ku, Sendai-shi, Miyagi-ken 981-8006; Japan
- Coordinates: 38°18′12″N 140°53′11″E
- System: Sendai Subway station
- Operator: Sendai City Transportation Bureau
- Line: Namboku Line
- Distance: 2.5 km (1.6 mi) from Izumi-Chūō
- Platforms: 1 island platform
- Connections

Construction
- Structure type: Underground

Other information
- Status: Staffed
- Station code: N03
- Website: Official website

History
- Opened: 15 July 1987; 39 years ago

Passengers
- Daily (FY2015): 3,987

Services
Preceding station	Sendai Subway	Following station
Asahigaoka N04 towards Tomizawa	Namboku Line	Yaotome N02 towards Izumi-Chūō
Location
- Location within Miyagi Prefecture Location within Japan

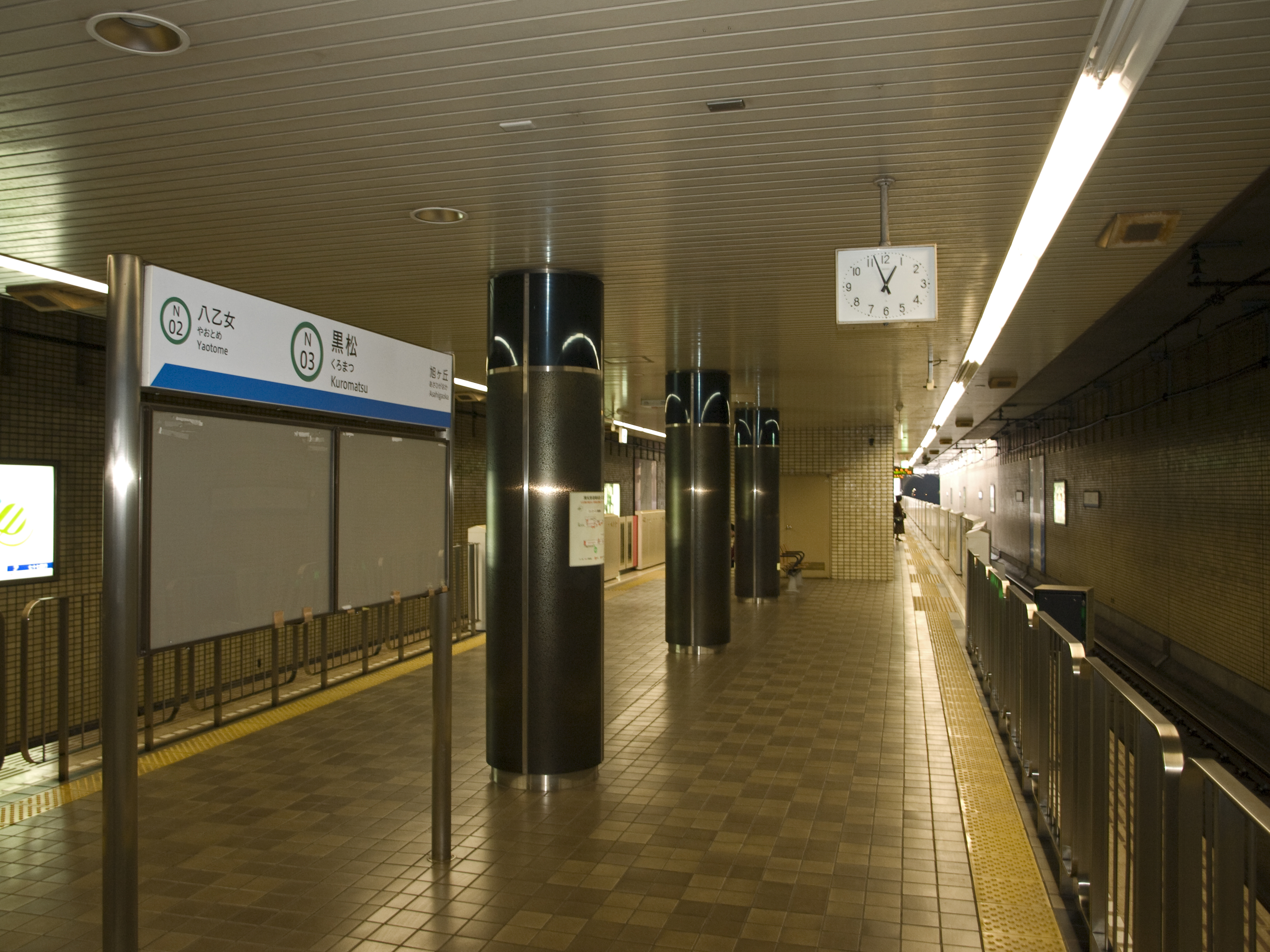
The platforms

Kuromatsu Station (黒松駅, Kuromatsu eki) is an underground metro station on the Sendai Subway Namboku Line in Izumi-ku, Sendai, Miyagi Prefecture, Japan.

== Lines ==
Kuromatsu Station is on the Sendai Subway Namboku Line and is located 2.5 rail kilometers from the terminus of the line at Izumi-Chūō Station.

== Station layout ==
Kuromatsu Station is an underground station with a single island platform serving two tracks.

=== Platforms ===
1	■ Namboku Line	■ for Sendai, Tomizawa
2	■ Namboku Line	■ for Izumi-Chūō

== History ==
Kuromatsu Station was opened on 15 July 1987. Operations were suspended from 11 March 2011 to 29 April 2012 due to damage sustained by the 2011 Tōhoku earthquake and tsunami.

== Passenger statistics ==
In fiscal 2015, the station was used by an average of 3,987 passengers daily.

== Surrounding area ==
- Izumi-Kuromatsu Post Office
