= Kita-Sendai Station =

Railway and metro station in Sendai, Japan

N06 Kita-Sendai Station 北仙台駅
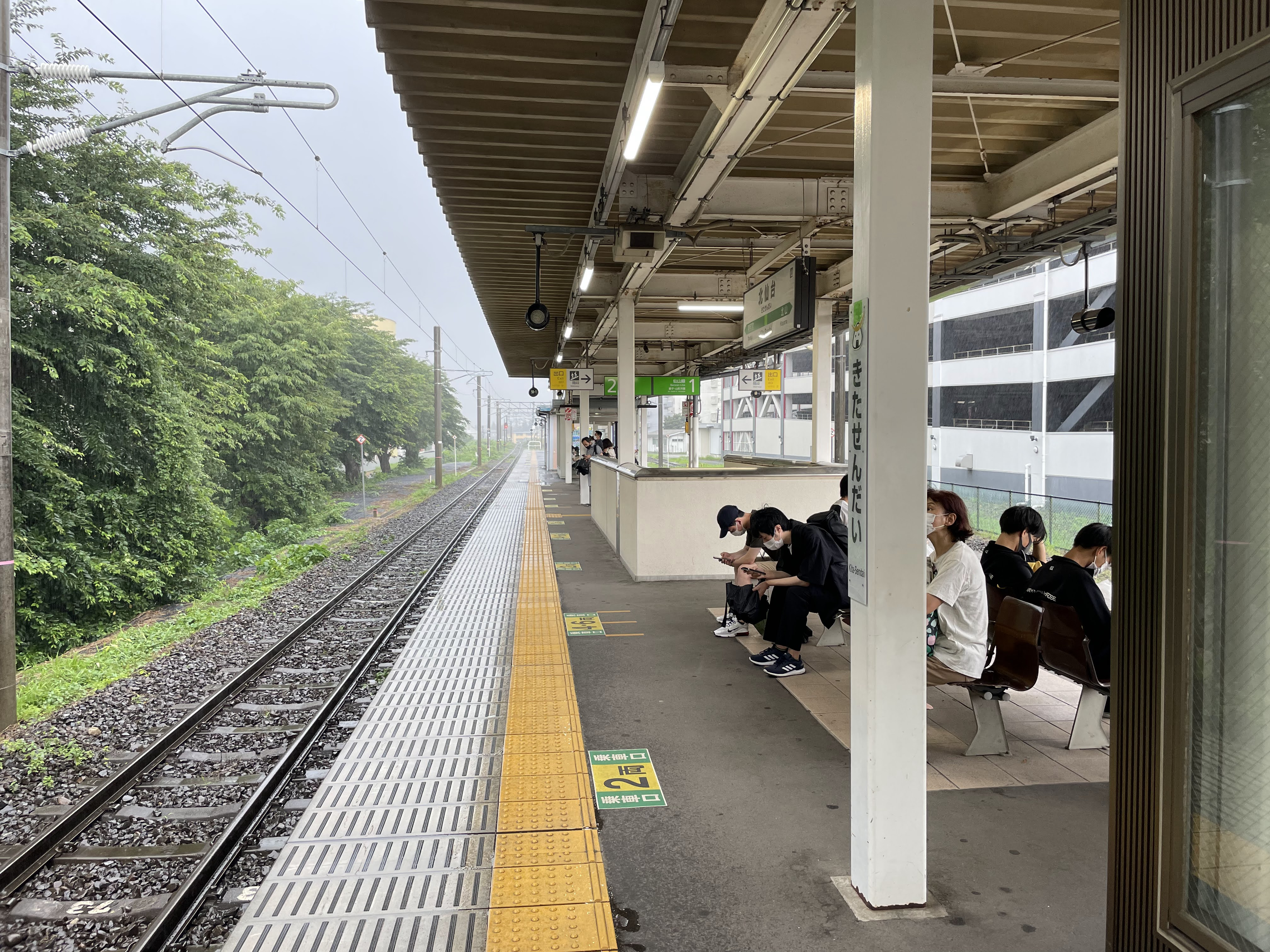
- JR Line Platform in July 2022

General information
- Location: Shōwa-machi, Aoba-ku, Sendai-shi, Miyagi-ken; Japan
- Coordinates: 38°16′54″N 140°52′09″E
- System: JR East station Sendai Subway station
- Operator: Sendai Subway station; Sendai City Transportation Bureau
- Lines: ■ Senzan Line; Namboku Line
- Connections: Bus stop

Other information
- Status: Staffed (Midori no Madoguchi)
- Station code: N06 (Namboku Line)

History
- Opened: 29 September 1929 (JR); 15 July 1987 (Subway)

Passengers
- FY2018 (Daily): 4,825 (JR); 8,510 (Subway)

Services
Preceding station	JR East	Following station
Kunimi towards Yamagata	Senzan Line Rapid A B	Sendai Terminus
Kitayama towards Yamagata	Senzan Line Rapid C Local	Tōshōgū towards Sendai
Preceding station	Sendai Subway	Following station
Kita-Yobanchō N07 towards Tomizawa	Namboku Line	Dainohara N05 towards Izumi-Chūō
Location
- Location within Miyagi Prefecture Location within Japan

Kita-Sendai Station (北仙台駅, Kita-Sendai eki) is a junction railway station in Aoba-ku, Sendai in Miyagi Prefecture, Japan, operated by East Japan Railway Company (JR East) and the Sendai Subway. The subway and JR lines are not directly connected, however, the distance between the two stations is only around one hundred metres.

== Lines ==
Kita-Sendai Station is served by the Senzan Line, and is located 4.8 kilometers from the terminus of the line at Sendai. It is also 5.4 kilometers from the terminus of the Sendai Subway Namboku Line at Izumi-Chūō.

== Station layout ==
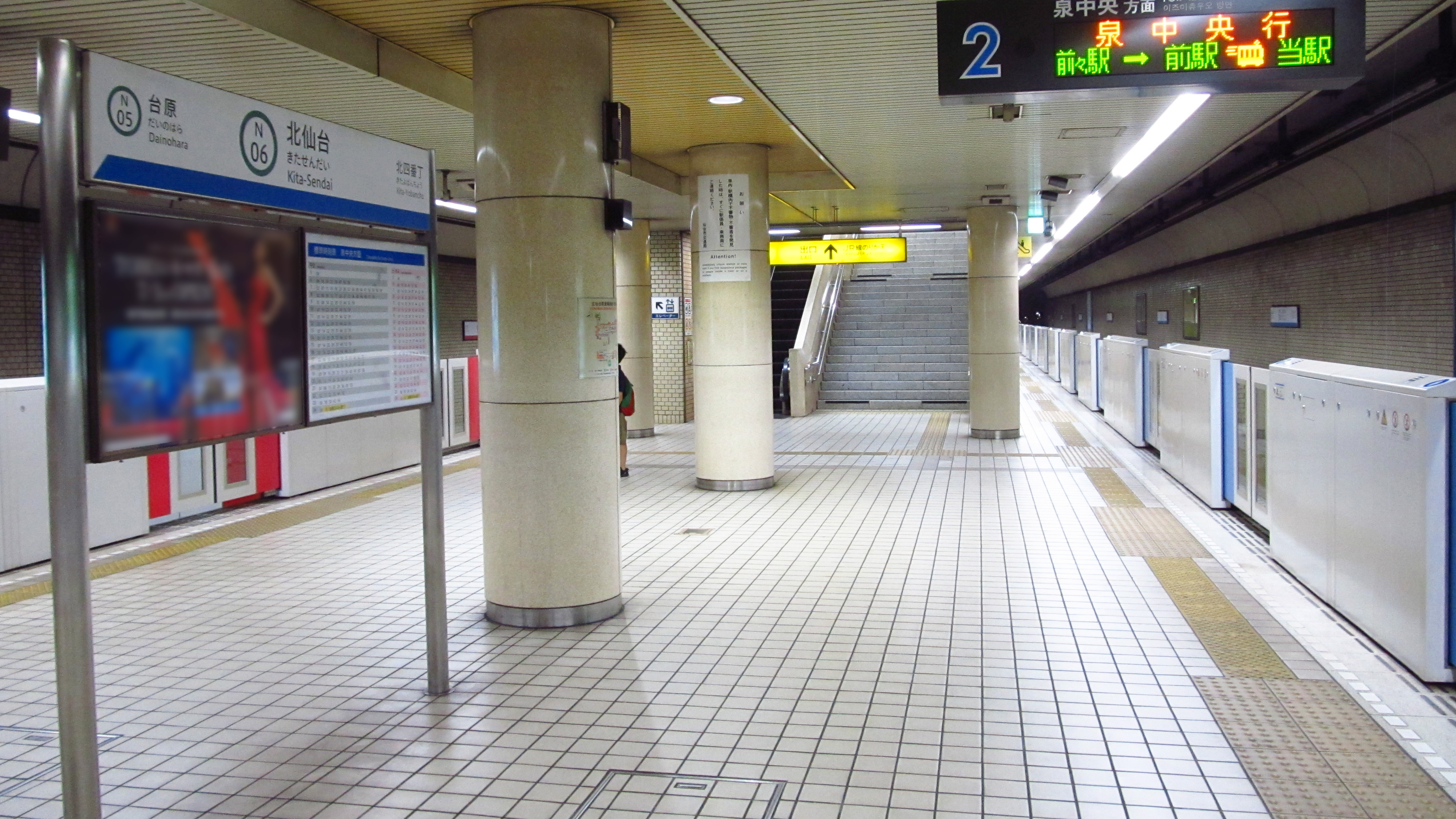
Kita-Sendai Station Namboku Line platform in July 2016

Kita-Sendai Station has a single aboveground island platform serving JR East, and a single underground island platform serving the Sendai Subway. The JR East portion of the station has a Midori no Madoguchi staffed ticket office.

=== JR East platforms ===
1	■ Senzan Line	for Sakunami, Yamadera, and Yamagata
2	■ Senzan Line	for Sendai

=== Sendai Subway platforms ===
1	■ Namboku Line	■ for Sendai and Tomizawa
2	■ Namboku Line	■ for Izumi-Chūō

== History ==
Kita-Sendai Station opened on 29 September 1929. The station became part of the JR East network with the privatization of Japanese National Railways (JNR) on 1 April 1987. The Sendai Subway station opened on 15 July 1987.

== Passenger statistics ==
In fiscal 2018, the JR East portion of the station was used by an average of 4,825 passengers daily (boarding passengers only). In fiscal 2015, the Sendai Subway portion of the station was used by an average of 8,510 passengers daily.

== Surrounding area ==
- Sendai City Martial Arts Hall & Aoba Gymnasium
- Kita-Sendai Post Office
- Aoba Shrine
- Kamisugiyama Junior High School

== See also ==
- List of railway stations in Japan
