= Iris Ohyama =

Japanese consumer plastic manufacturer

Iris Ohyama Inc.

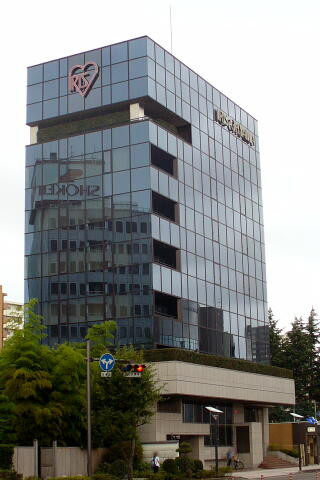
- Headquarters in Aoba-ku, Sendai
- Native name: アイリスオーヤマ株式会社
- Romanized name: Airisu-Ōyama Kabushiki-gaisha
- Company type: Private (KK)
- Founded: April 14, 1971; 55 years ago
- Headquarters: Itsutsubashi, Aoba-ku, Sendai, Miyagi Prefecture, Japan
- Key people: Kentaro Ohyama
- Revenue: ¥68.5 billion JPY (2004/2005)
- Number of employees: 2,160
- Website: irisohyama.co.jp/english/

Iris Ohyama Inc. (アイリスオーヤマ株式会社, Airisu-Ōyama Kabushiki-gaisha) is a Japanese consumer plastic manufacturer based in Aoba-ku, Sendai, Miyagi Prefecture. It is the leading storage organization manufacturer in Japan. The company designs and manufactures products aimed at the furniture, housewares, garden accessories, office products and pet supplies markets.

Iris Ohyama Europe B.V. has its offices in Tilburg, the Netherlands.

In March 2019 a second factory was opened in Lieusaint, Paris to boost the sales on the European market

The first plant outside Japan was opened in Stockton, California in 1995. Tilburg was chosen as the location for the establishment of Iris Ohyama Europe's first office and production facilities in Europe.

Since 2004, Iris Ohyama has been a main sponsor of the Vegalta Sendai soccer team in Japan's J. League. It is also a sponsor for the Tohoku Rakuten Golden Eagles baseball team, and backer of the Sendai philharmonic orchestra.

As of 2010, Kentaro Ohyama (大山 健太郎, Ōyama Kentarō) is the president of the company.

== Head office ==
The current head office opened in March 1993.
