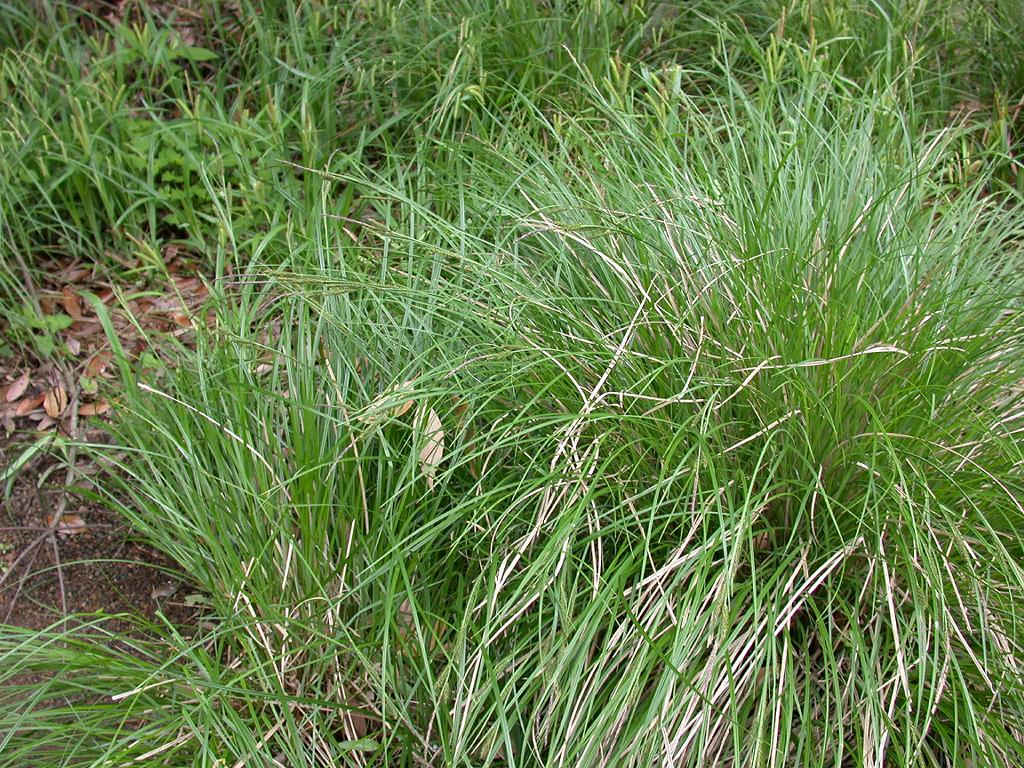

Scientific classification
- Kingdom: Plantae
- Clade: Tracheophytes
- Clade: Angiosperms
- Clade: Monocots
- Clade: Commelinids
- Order: Poales
- Family: Cyperaceae
- Genus: Carex
- Species: C. forficula

Binomial name
- Carex forficula Franch. & Sav.

= Carex forficula =

Species of plant

Carex forficula, also known as scissors-like sedge and xi shui tai cao in pinyin in China, is a tussock-forming species of perennial sedge in the family Cyperaceae. It is native to Japan, Korea, and eastern parts of China and Russia.

The species was first formally described by the botanists Adrien René Franchet and Ludovic Savatier in 1878 as a part of the work Enumeratio Plantarum in Japonia Sponte Crescentium.

== See also ==
- List of Carex species
