= Aoba-ku, Sendai =

Aoba-ku, Sendai 青葉区
- Ward of Sendai
- 青葉区• Aoba-ku
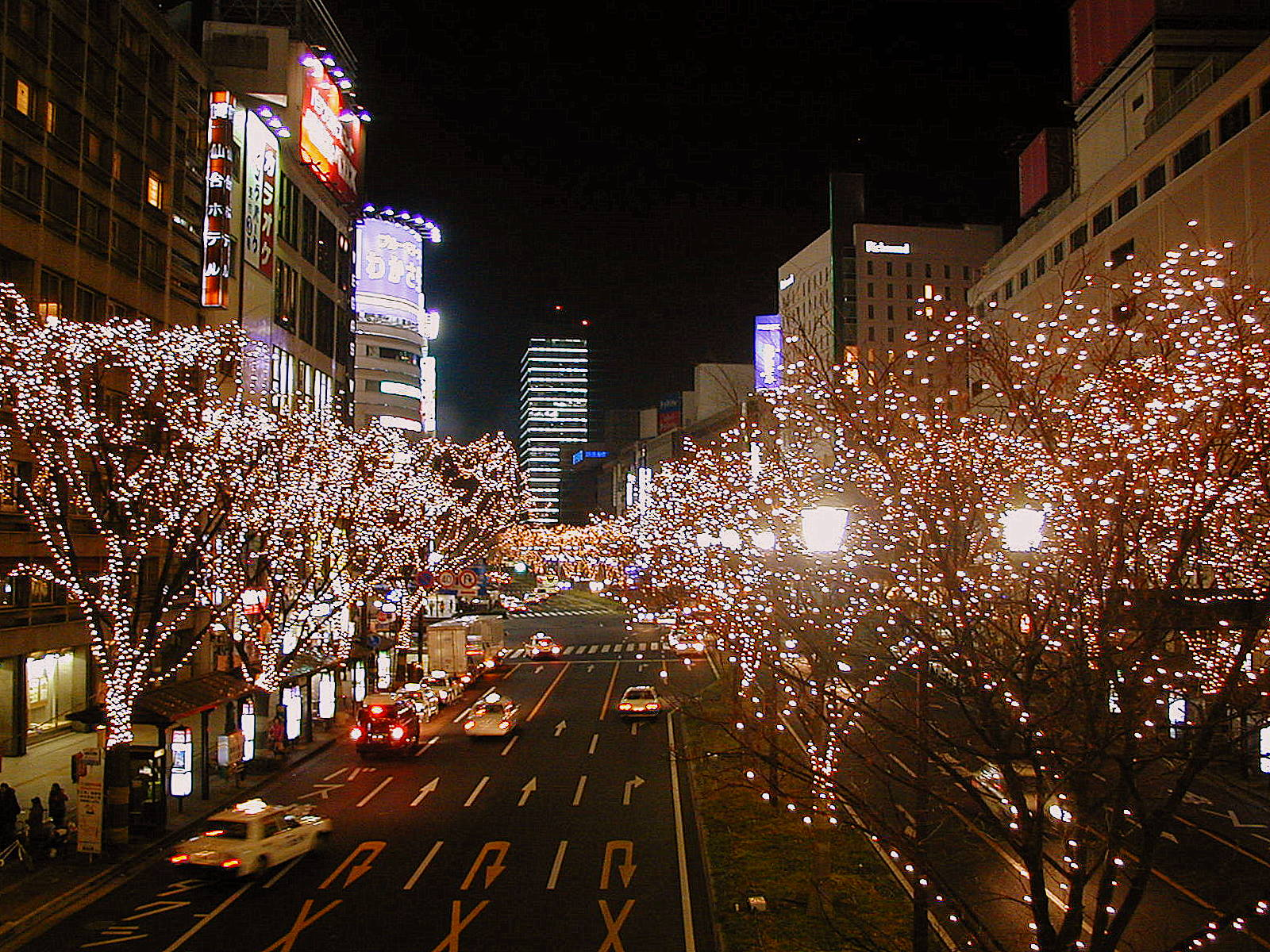
- Sendai Pageant of Starlight in Aoba-dori avenue

- Flag

- Location of Aoba-ku in Sendai

- Coordinates: 38°16′09″N 140°52′14″E
- Country: Japan
- Region: Tōhoku
- Prefecture: Miyagi
- City: Sendai
- Established: April 1, 1989

Area
  - Total: 302.27 km^{2} (116.71 sq mi)

Population (March 1, 2012)
  - Total: 296,551
  - Density: 981.08/km^{2} (2,541.0/sq mi)
- Time zone: UTC+09:00 (Japan Standard Time)
- Postal: 980-8701
- Address: 1-5-1 Uesugi, Aoba-ku, Sendai-shi, Miyagi-ken
- Telephone: 022-225-7211

Location of Aoba-ku in Sendai

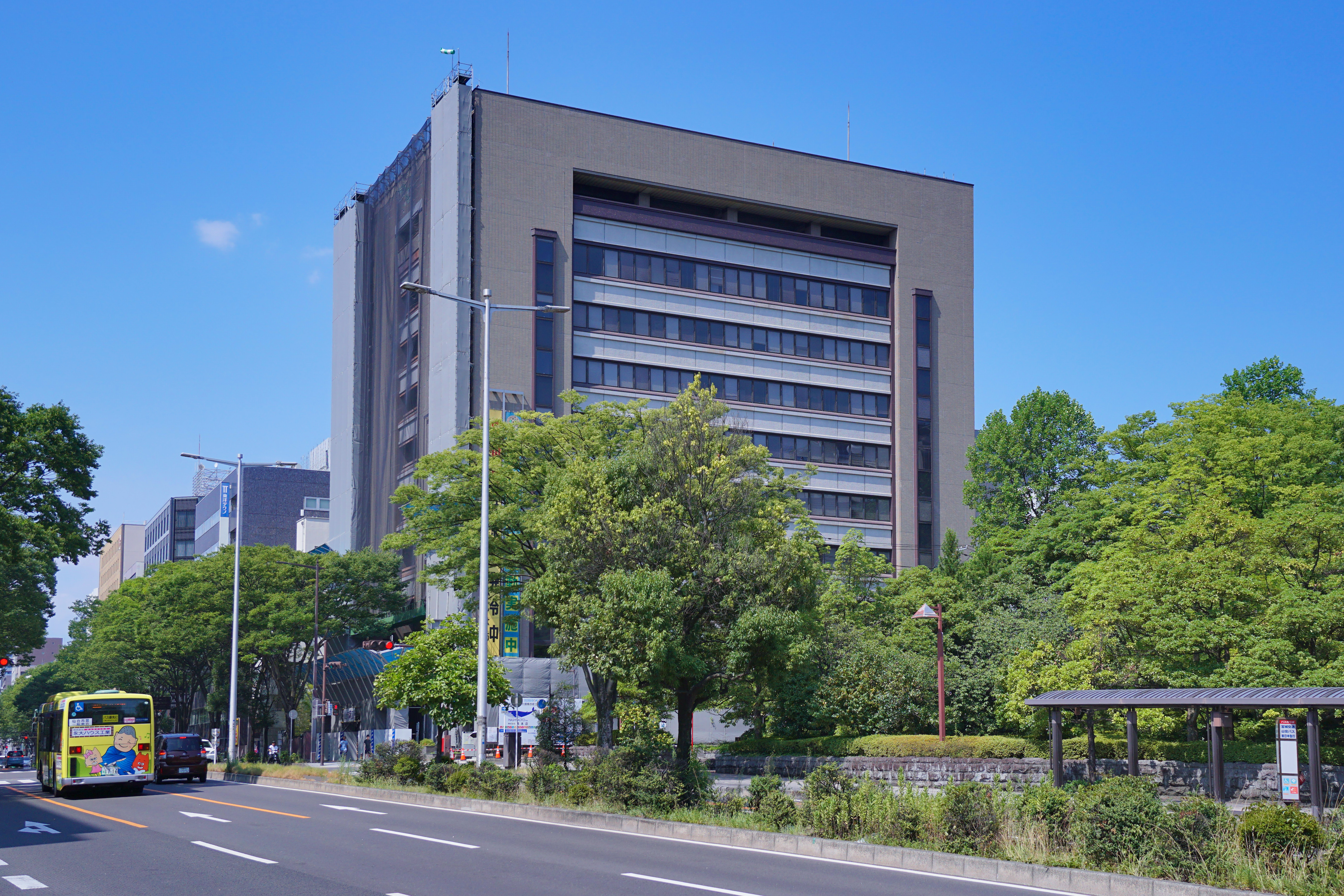
Aoba-ku Ward Office

Aoba-ku (青葉区) is one of five wards of Sendai, the largest city in the Tōhoku region of Japan. Aoba-ku encompasses 302.278 km² and had a population of 296,551, with 147,622 households as of March 1, 2012.

== Infrastructure ==
The Miyagi Prefecture government office and the main city government offices are located there, along with JR Sendai Station, a train station that is surrounded by many types of stores. A short walk from the station is the Ichibancho shopping district, a popular destination. The outdoor shopping mall is home to countless shops and restaurants, such as McDonald's and kimono stores. Eight stations of the Sendai Subway Namboku Line are also located in this ward.

== Economy ==
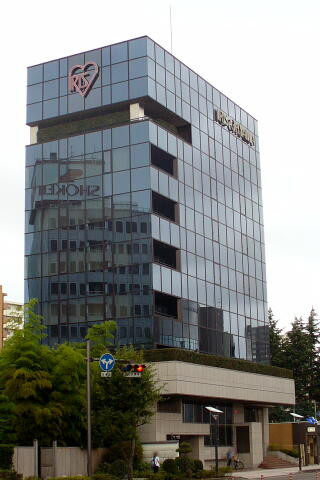
Iris Ohyama headquarters

Iris Ohyama has its headquarters in Aoba-ku.

Air China has an office on the 1st floor of the Sendai Honcho Park Building in Aoba-ku. Asiana Airlines operates a sales office in the Taiyoseimei Sendai-eki Kita Building in Aoba-ku.

== Tourism ==
A popular tourist destination in Aoba-ku is Jozenji-Dori, a zelkova-lined street with El Greco sculptures that draws crowds year-round. Photographs of the sculptures are often used for postcards.

The main shrine building (shaden) of the Shinto shrine Ōsaki Hachiman-gū located in Aoba-ku has been designated as a National Treasure of Japan.

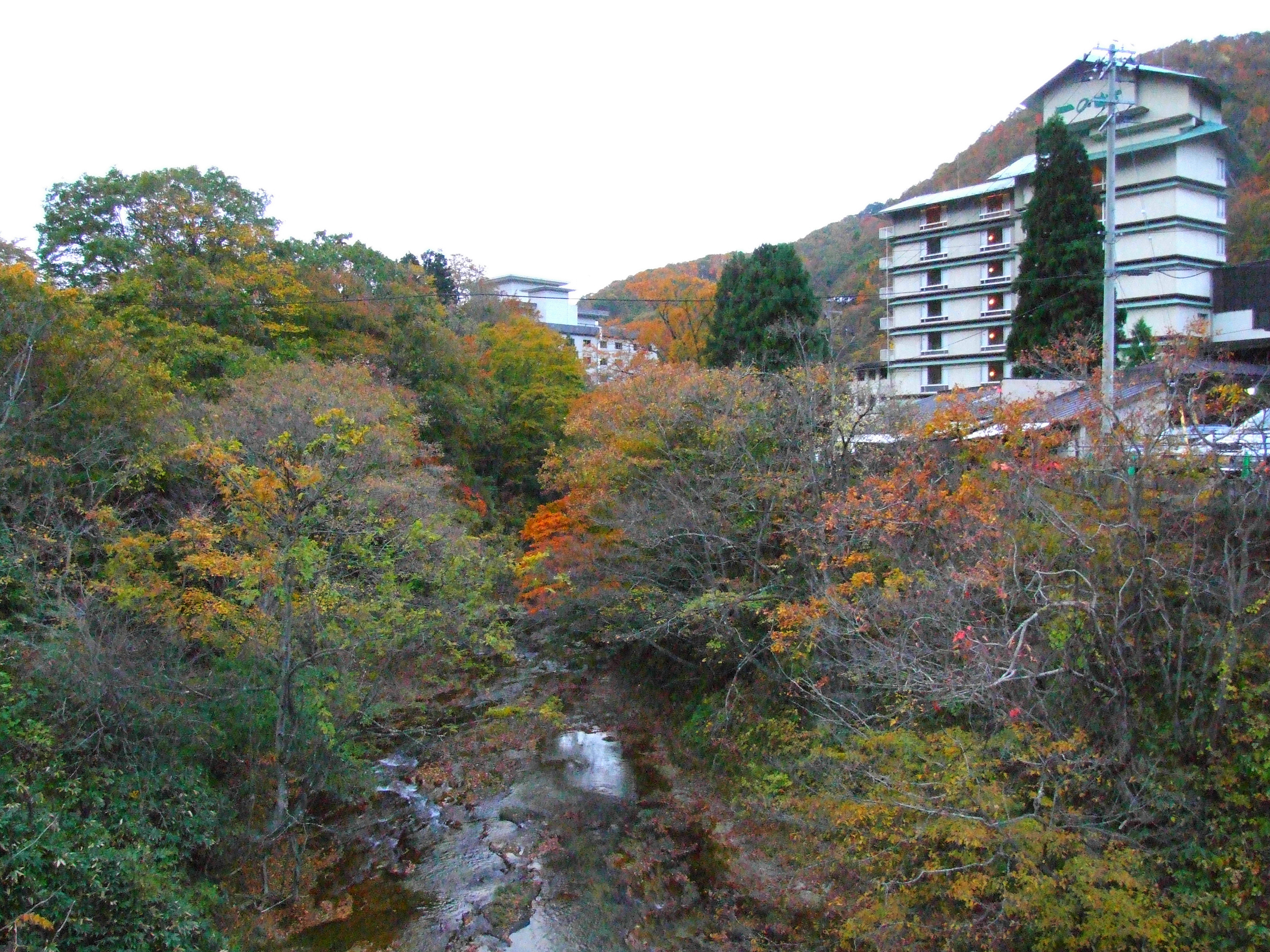
Sakunami Spa and Hirose river gorge

== Education and resources ==
Sendai International Center is located near the Ichibancho district and the campus of Tohoku University. The International Center offers information for foreigners in the city, including a library of books in languages other than Japanese (predominantly English).

The South Korean government maintains the Korea Education Institution in the city.

== Points of interest ==
- Botanical Garden of Tohoku University
- Saihō-ji Temple
- Ōsaki Hachiman-gū

== Transport ==
=== Railway stations ===
- JR East
  - Tōhoku Shinkansen: Sendai
  - Jōban Line: Sendai
  - Senseki Line: Aoba-dōri
  - Senzan Line: Sendai - Tōshōgū - Kita-Sendai - Kitayama - Kunimi - Kuzuoka Station - Rikuzen-Ochiai - Ayashi - Rikuzen-Shirasawa - Kumagane - Nishi-Sendai Hi-Land - Sakunami - Yatsumori - Okunikkawa
  - Tōhoku Main Line: Sendai
- Sendai Subway
  - Namboku Line: Asahigaoka - Dainohara - Kita-Sendai - Kita-Yobanchō - Kōtōdai-Kōen - Hirose-dōri - Sendai - Itsutsubashi

=== Highways ===
- Tōhoku Expressway – (Sendai-Miyagi Interchange)
- National Route 4
- National Route 45
- National Route 48
- National Route 457
