= Uzen-Takamatsu Station =

Railway station in Sagae, Yamagata Prefecture, Japan

Uzen-Takamatsu Station 羽前高松駅
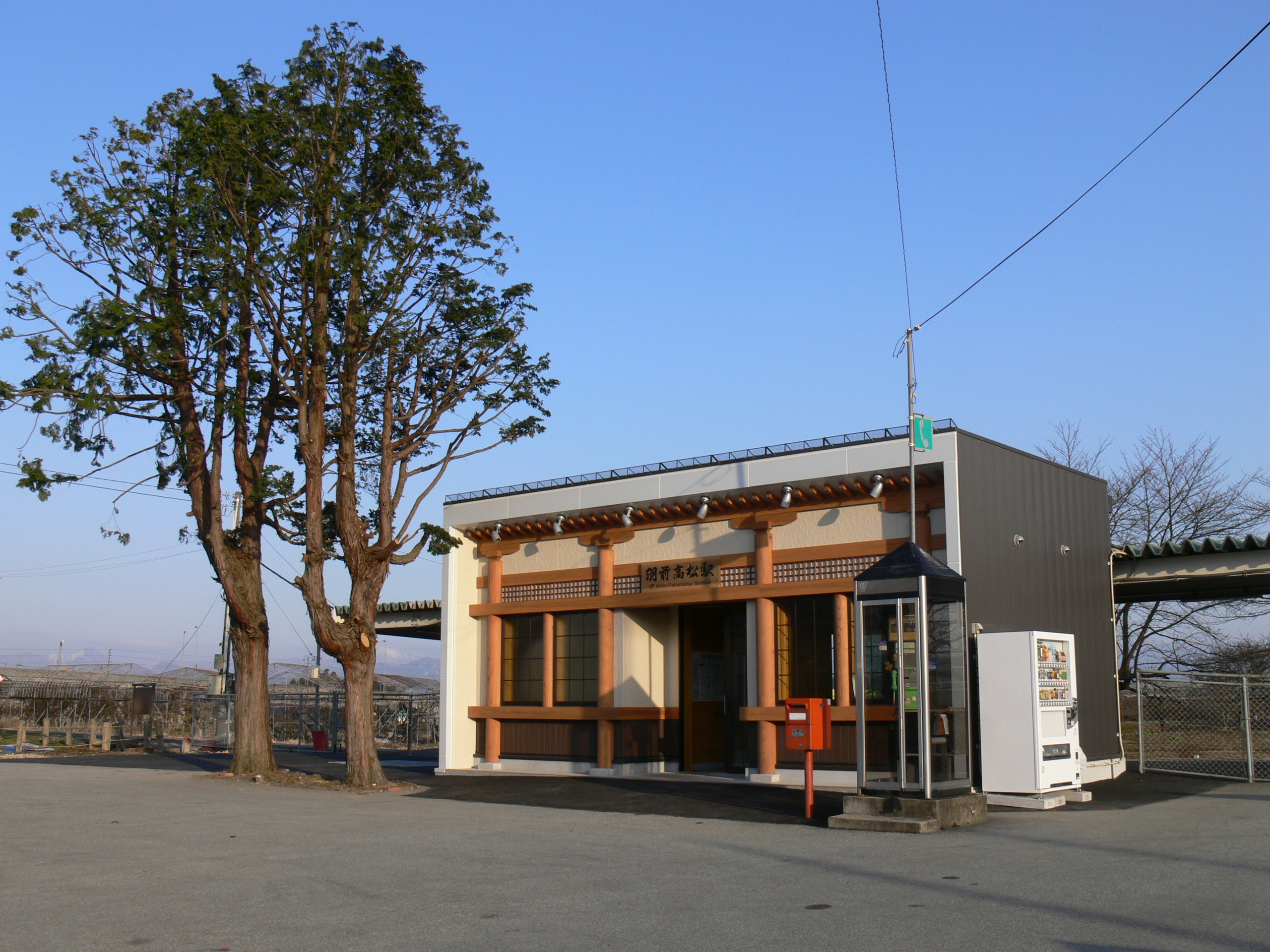
- Uzen-Takamatsu Station, April 2010

General information
- Location: Gōnome, Yakuwa, Sagae-shi, Yamagata-ken 995-0524; Japan
- Coordinates: 38°23′52″N 140°14′55″E
- Operator: JR East
- Line: Aterazawa Line
- Distance: 19.3 km (12.0 mi) from Kita-Yamagata
- Platforms: 1 side platform

Other information
- Status: Unstaffed
- Website: Official website

History
- Opened: 23 April 1922; 104 years ago

Passengers
- FY2006: 296 daily

Services
Preceding station	JR East	Following station
Shibahashi towards Aterazawa	Aterazawa Line	Nishi-Sagae towards Yamagata
Route map
Location
- Location within Yamagata Prefecture Location within Japan

Uzen-Takamatsu Station (羽前高松駅, Uzen-Takamatsu-eki) is a railway station on the Aterazawa Line in the city of Sagae, Yamagata, Japan, operated by East Japan Railway Company (JR East).

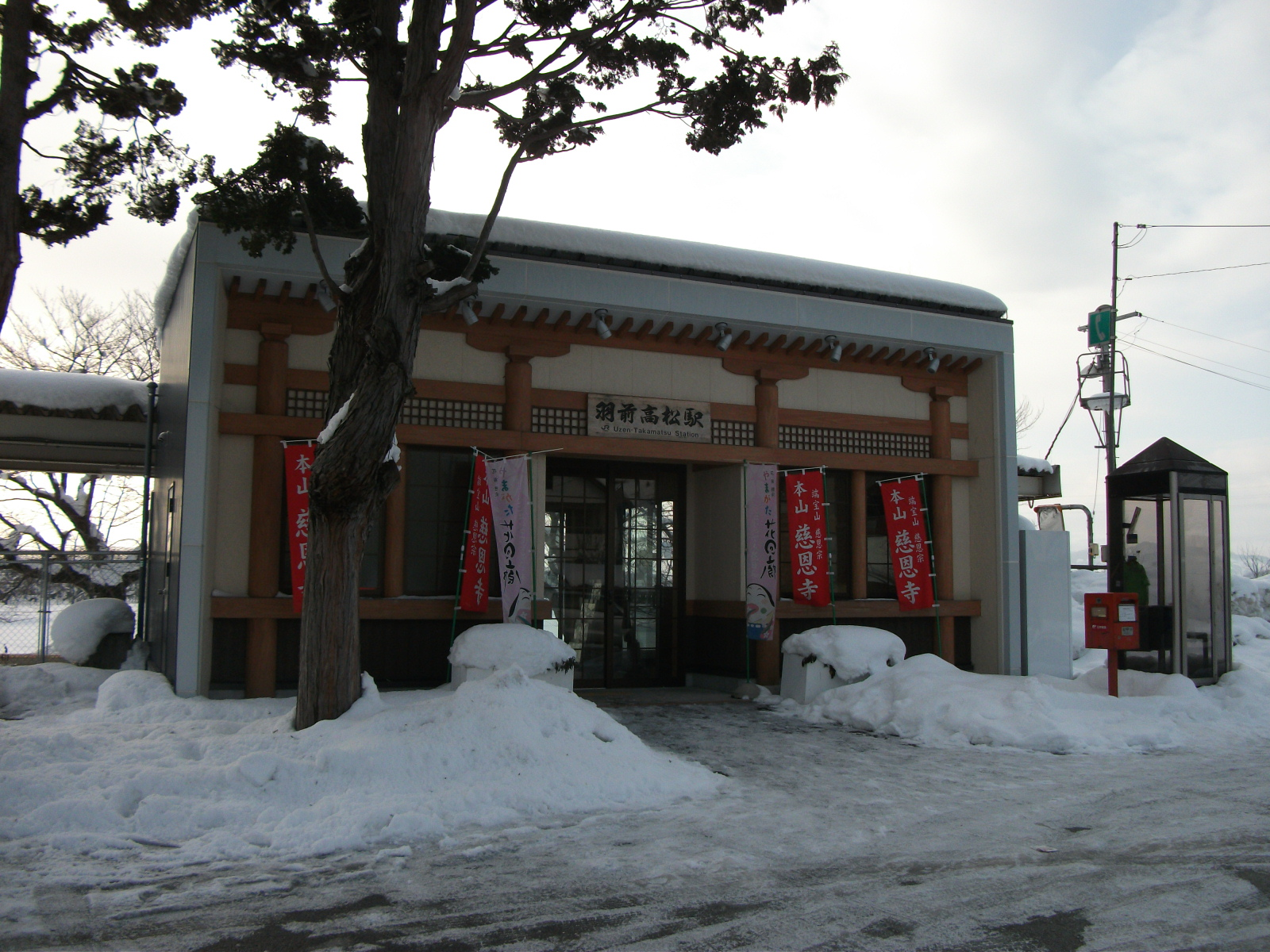
Uzen-Takamatsu Station in Winter

== Lines ==
Uzen-Takamatsu Station is served by the Aterazawa Line and is located 19.3 km (12.0 mi) from the start of the line at Kita-Yamagata, and 5 km (3.1 mi) from Aterazawa. The preceding station of Nishi-Sagae is 2.9 km (1.8 mi) away and the following station of Shibahashi is 3 km (1.9 mi) away.

== Station layout ==
The station has a single side platform serving a single bi-directional track. The station building is designed in the image of nearby Jion-ji Temple, which is a National Important Cultural Property.The station has no accessibility features.

=== Platforms ===
-	■ Aterazawa Line	for Yamagata
-	■ Aterazawa Line	for Aterazawa

== History ==
Uzen-Takamatsu Station began operation on 23 April 1922. From 1926 to 1974, the station was also used by the now-defunct Sanzan Line of the Yamagata Railway, and during that period had two opposed side platforms, and a bay platform. With the privatization of JNR on 1 April 1987, the station came under the control of JR East. A new station building was completed in 28 February 2010, replacing a previous wooden structure dating from 1940.

== Passenger statistics ==
In fiscal 2006, the station was used by an average of 296 passengers daily (boarding passengers only). Since 2007, JR East has not reported the passenger numbers for Uzen-Takamatsu Station.

Below is table containing the passenger statistics since the year 2000 to the year 2004:

Passenger statistics
Year	Average Daily Boarding Passengers
2000	304
2001	277
2002	298
2003	303
2004	312
2005	310
2006	296

== Surrounding area ==
- Jion-ji Temple
- Daigo Elementary School
- Takamatsu Elementary School
- Ryōnichi Junior High School
- Mogami River
- National Route 112
- National Route 287

== See also ==
- List of railway stations in Japan
