= Uzen-Kanezawa Station =

Railway station in Nakayama, Yamagata Prefecture, Japan

Uzen-Kanezawa Station 羽前金沢駅
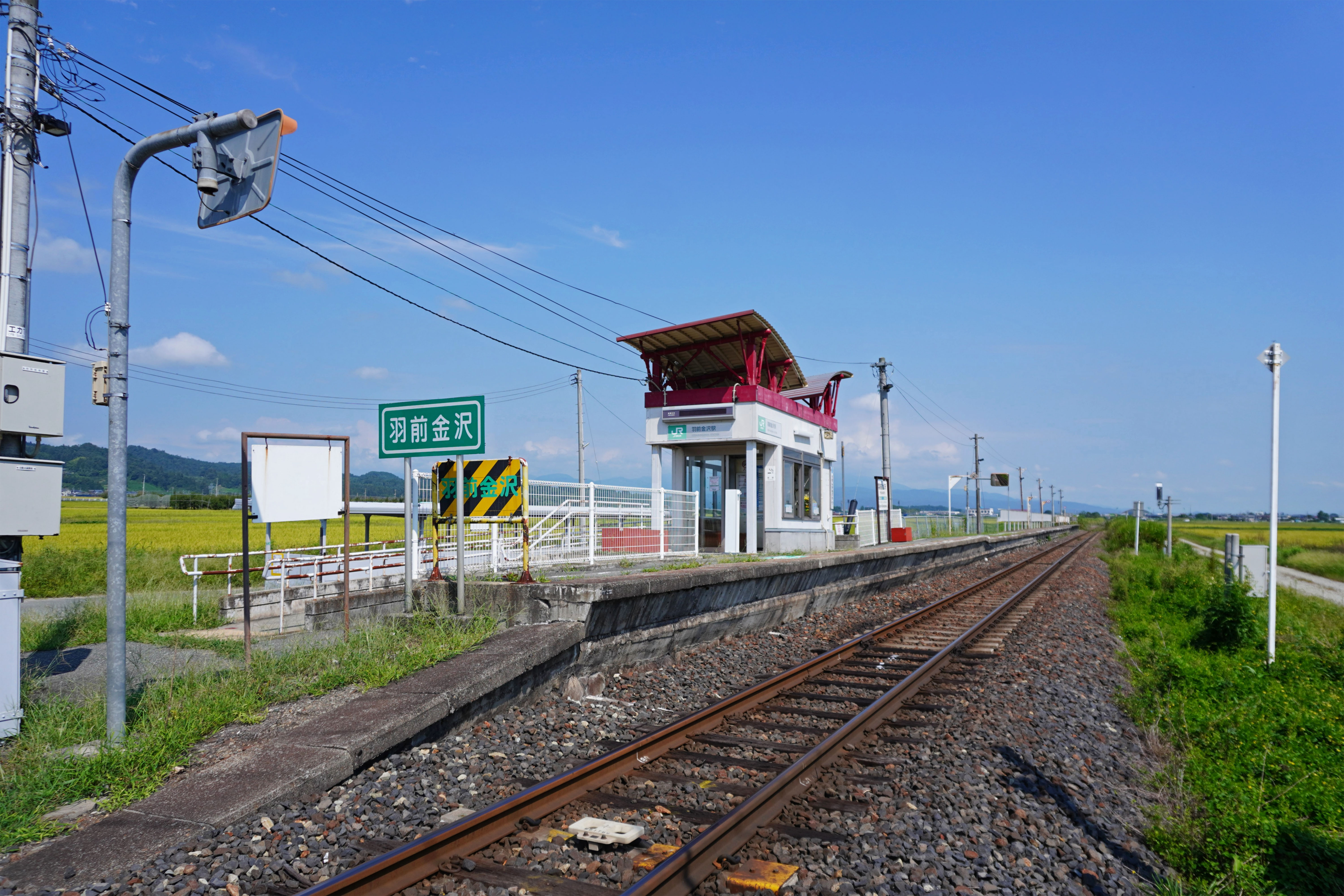
- Uzen-Kanezawa Station in September 2023

General information
- Location: Kanezawa, Nakayama-machi, Higashimurayama-gun, Yamagata-ken 990-0401; Japan
- Coordinates: 38°19′14″N 140°16′13″E
- Operator: JR East
- Line: Aterazawa Line
- Distance: 9.5 km (5.9 mi) from Kita-Yamagata
- Platforms: 1 side platform

Other information
- Status: Unstaffed
- Website: Official website

History
- Opened: 25 December 1951; 74 years ago

Passengers
- FY2004: 30

Services
Preceding station	JR East	Following station
Uzen-Nagasaki towards Aterazawa	Aterazawa Line	Uzen-Yamabe towards Yamagata
Route map
Location
- Location within Yamagata Prefecture Location within Japan

Uzen-Kanezawa Station (羽前金沢駅, Uzen-Kanezawa eki) is a railway station located in the town of Nakayama, Yamagata Prefecture, Japan, operated by the East Japan Railway Company (JR East).

== Lines ==
Uzen-Kanezawa Station is served by the Aterazawa Line and is located 9.5 km (5.9 mi) from the start of the line at Kita-Yamagata, and 14.8 km (9.2 mi) from Aterazawa. The preceding station of Uzen-Yamabe is 3 km (1.9 mi) away and the following station of Uzen-Nagasaki is 1.5 km (0.93 mi) away.

== Station layout ==
The station has a single side platform serving one bi-directional track. There is no station building, and the station is unattended. The station has no accessibility features.

=== Platforms ===
-	■ Aterazawa Line	for Yamagata
-	■ Aterazawa Line	for Aterazawa

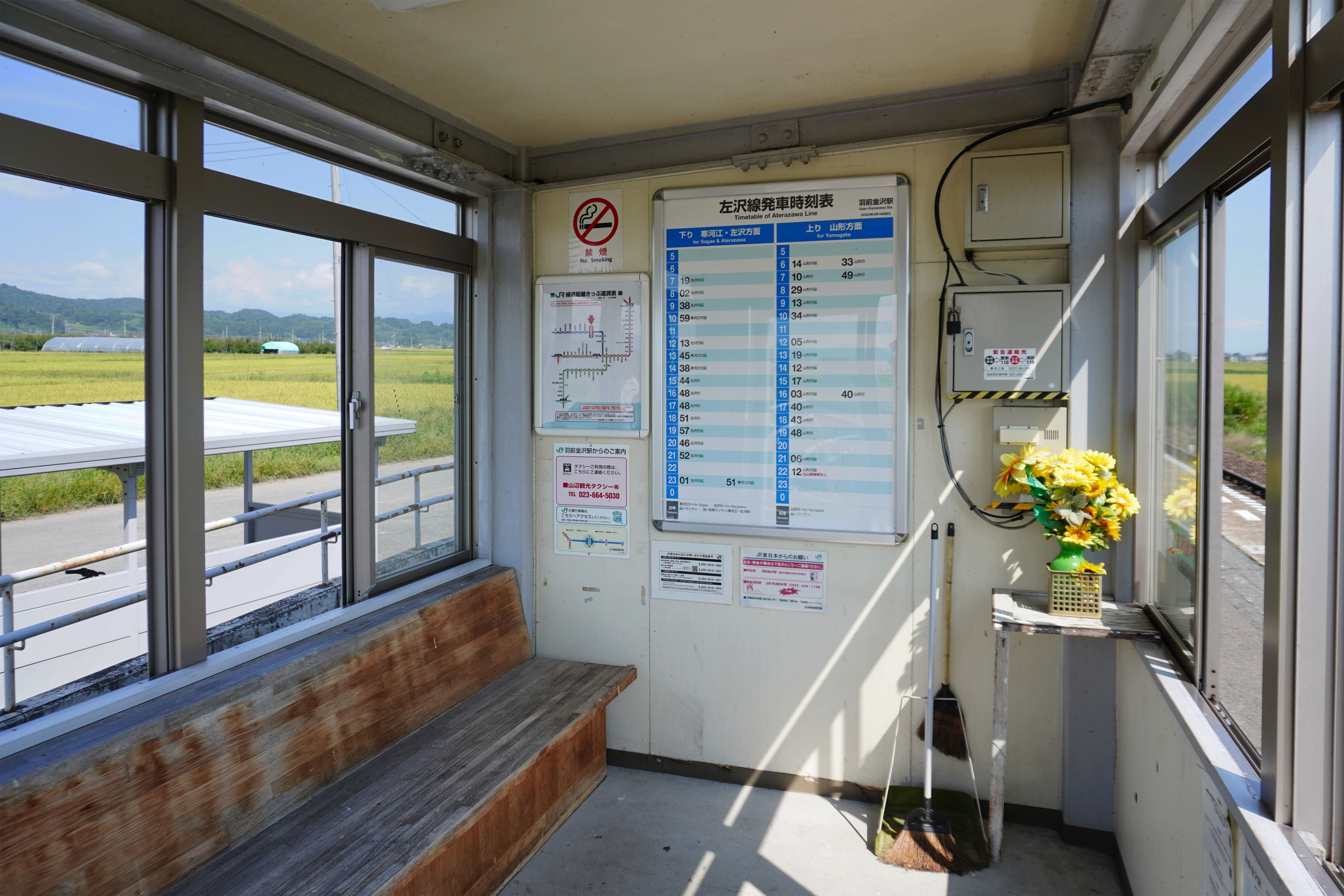
Waiting Room (September 2023)

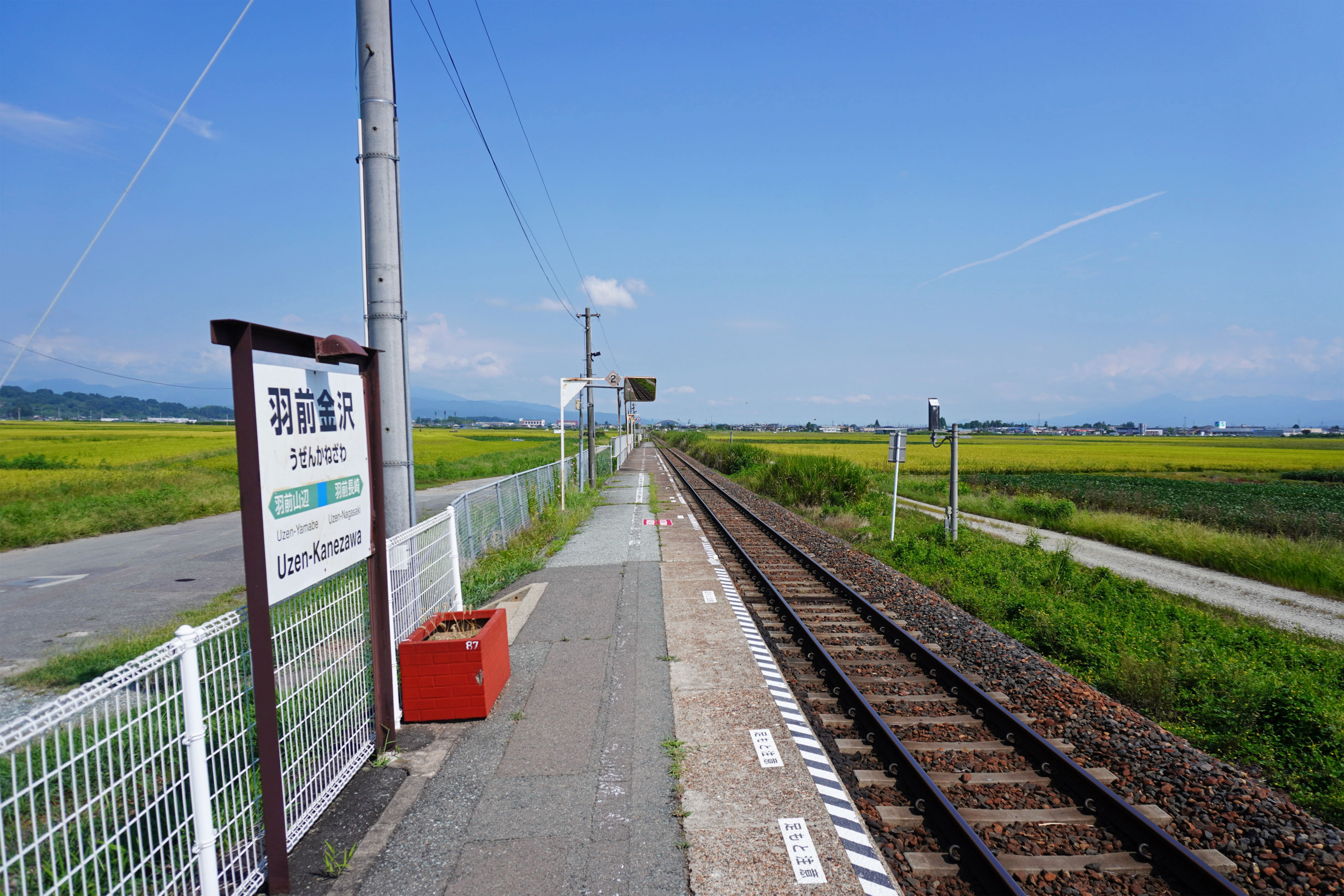
Platform (September 2023)

== History ==
Uzen-Kanezawa Station began operation on 25 December 1951. With the privatization of the JNR on 1 April 1987, the station came under the control of the East Japan Railway Company.

The Station will start accepting Suica Cards in Spring 2024, with the extension of the Sendai area Suica zone to Yamagata Prefecture.

== Passenger statistics ==
In fiscal 2004, the station was used by an average of 30 passengers daily. Since 2005, Yamagata Prefecture has not reported the passenger numbers for Uzen-Kanezawa Station.

Below is table containing the passenger statistics from the year 2000 to the year 2004:

Passenger statistics
Year	Average Daily Boarding Passengers
2000	26
2001	27
2002	24
2003	26
2004	30

== Surrounding area ==
- National Route 458

== See also ==
- List of railway stations in Japan
