= List of cities in Yamagata Prefecture by population =

The following list sorts all cities (including towns and villages) in the Japanese prefecture of Yamagata with a population of more than 10,000 according to the 2020 Census. As of October 1, 2020, 21 places fulfill this criterion and are listed here. This list refers only to the population of individual cities, towns and villages within their defined limits, which does not include other municipalities or suburban areas within urban agglomerations.

== List ==
The following table lists the 21 cities, towns and villages in Yamagata with a population of at least 10,000 on October 1, 2020, according to the 2020 Census. The table also gives an overview of the evolution of the population since the 1995 census.

Rank (2020)	Name	Status	2020	2015	2010	2005	2000	1995
1	Yamagata	City	247,747	253,832	254,244	256,012	255,369	254,488
2	Tsuruoka	City	122,454	129,652	136,623	142,384	147,546	149,509
3	Sakata	City	100,320	106,244	111,151	117,577	121,614	122,536
4	Yonezawa	City	81,326	85,953	89,401	93,178	95,396	95,592
5	Tendō	City	62,166	62,194	62,214	63,864	63,231	60,626
6	Higashine	City	47,725	47,768	46,414	45,834	44,800	43,208
7	Sagae	City	40,208	41,256	42,373	43,625	43,379	42,805
8	Shinjō	City	34,445	36,894	38,850	40,717	42,151	42,896
9	Nan'yō	City	30,437	32,285	33,658	35,190	36,191	36,810
10	Kaminoyama	City	29,139	31,569	33,836	36,013	36,886	38,047
11	Nagai	City	26,564	27,757	29,473	30,929	31,987	32,727
12	Murayama	City	22,537	24,684	26,811	28,192	29,586	30,506
13	Takahata	Town	22,471	23,882	25,025	26,026	26,807	26,964
14	Shōnai	Town	20,160	21,666	23,158	24,677	25,489	26,251
15	Kahoku	Town	17,649	18,952	19,959	20,738	21,476	21,930
16	Obanazawa	City	14,984	16,953	18,955	20,695	22,010	23,127
17	Kawanishi	Town	14,541	15,751	17,313	18,769	19,688	20,764
18	Yamanobe	Town	13,732	14,369	15,139	15,415	15,512	15,357
19	Yuza	Town	13,033	14,207	15,480	16,852	18,037	18,895
20	Shirataka	Town	12,897	14,175	15,314	16,331	17,149	17,706
21	Nakayama	Town	10,751	11,363	12,015	12,523	12,573	12,390
