= Uzen-Yamabe Station =

Railway station in Yamanobe, Yamagata Prefecture, Japan

Uzen-Yamabe Station 羽前山辺駅
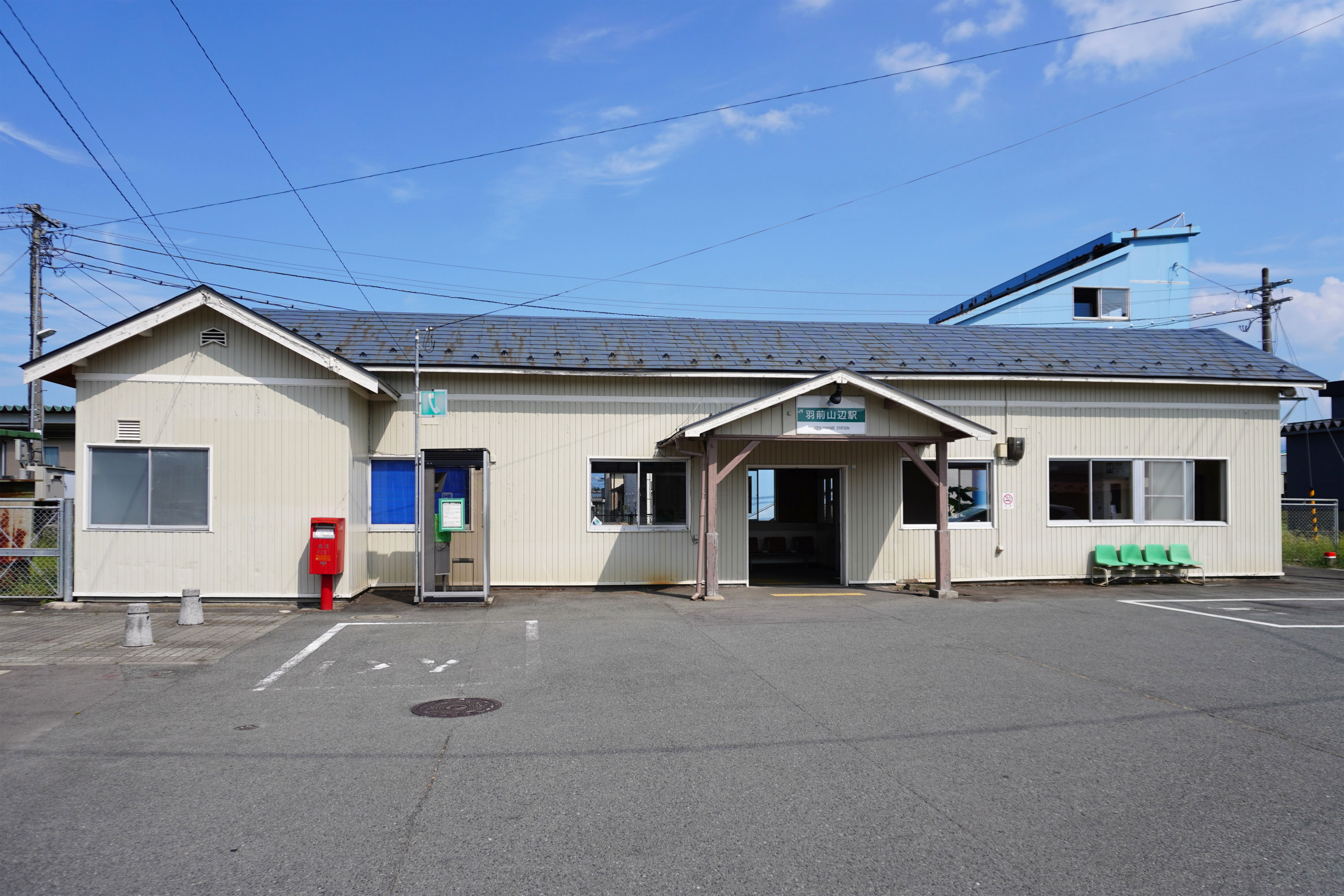
- Uzen-Yamabe Station, September 2023

General information
- Location: Yamanobe, Yamanobe-machi. Higashimurayama-gun, Yamagata-ken 990-0301; Japan
- Coordinates: 38°17′38″N 140°16′18″E
- Operator: JR East
- Line: Aterazawa Line
- Distance: 6.5 km (4.0 mi) from Kita-Yamagata
- Platforms: 1 island platform

Other information
- Status: Unstaffed
- Website: Official website

History
- Opened: 20 July 1921; 105 years ago

Passengers
- FY2017: 797

Services
Preceding station	JR East	Following station
Uzen-Kanezawa towards Aterazawa	Aterazawa Line	Higashi-Kanai towards Yamagata
Route map
Location
- Location within Yamagata Prefecture Location within Japan

Uzen-Yamabe Station (羽前山辺駅, Uzen-Yamabe eki) is a railway station located in the town of Yamanobe, Yamagata Prefecture, Japan, operated by the East Japan Railway Company (JR East).

== Lines ==
Uzen-Yamabe Station is served by the Aterazawa Line and is located 6.5 km (4.0 mi) from the start of the line at Kita-Yamagata, and 17.8 km (11.1 mi) from Aterazawa. The preceding station of Higashi-Kanai is 3.4 km (2.1 mi) away and the following station of Uzen-Kanezawa is 3 km (1.9 mi) away.

== Station layout ==
The station has a single island platforms connected to the station building by a footbridge. The station is unattended and has no accessibility features.

=== Platforms ===
1	■ Aterazawa Line	for Aterazawa
2	■ Aterazawa Line	for Yamagata

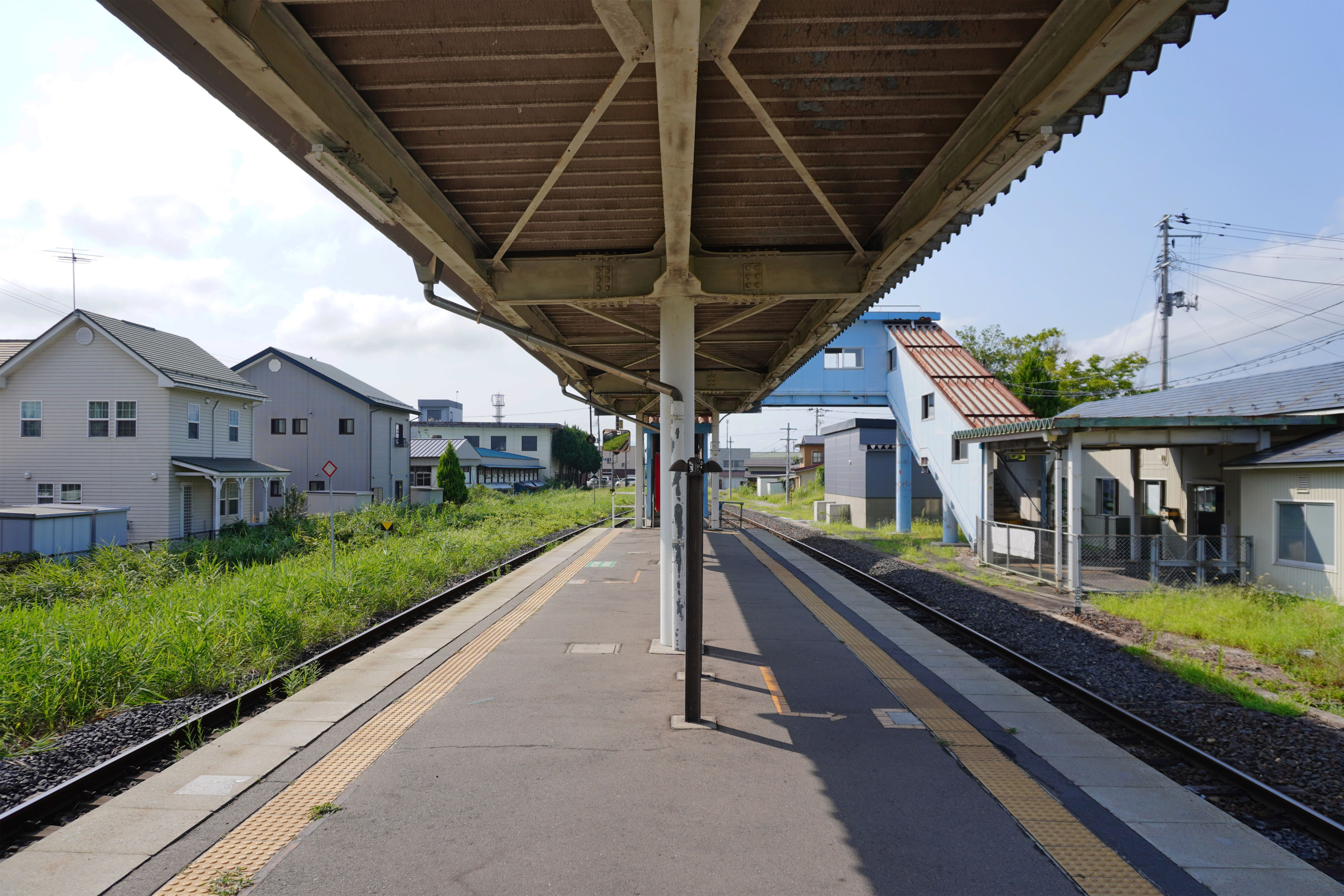
Platform (September 2023)

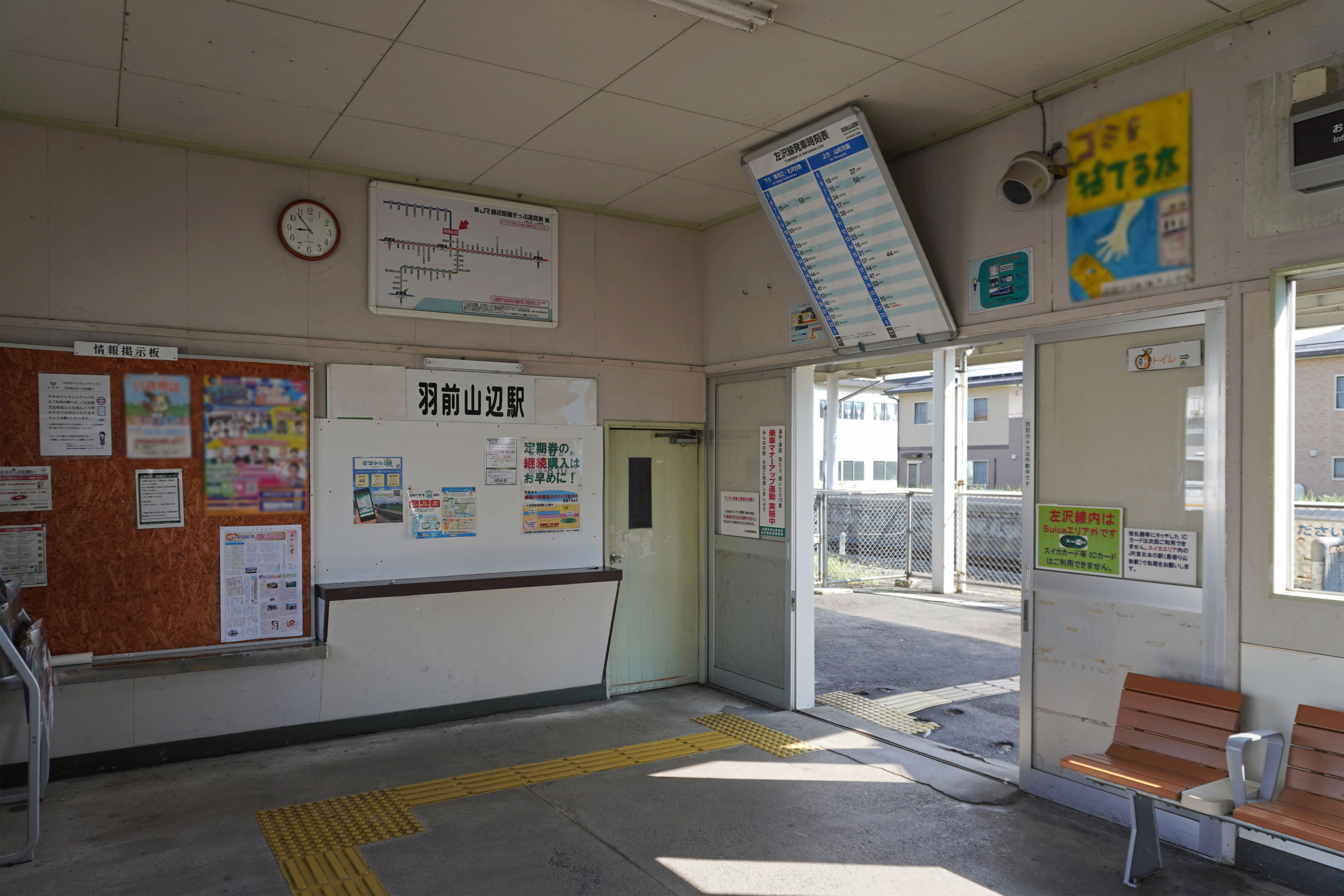
Ticket Gate (September 2023)

== History ==
Uzen-Yamabe Station began operation on July 20, 1921. A new station building was completed in November 1940. With the privatization of the JNR on April 1, 1987, the station came under the control of the East Japan Railway Company.

In September 2023, JR-East announced that they were going to rebuild the 87 year old station building from 1940. Construction started in November 2023 and is expected to finish in Spring of 2024.

The Station will start accepting Suica Cards in Spring 2024, with the extension of the Sendai area Suica zone to Yamagata Prefecture.

== Passenger statistics ==
In fiscal 2017, the station was used by an average of 797 passengers daily. Since 2018, Yamagata Prefecture has not reported the passenger numbers for Uzen-Kanezawa Station.

Below is table containing the passenger statistics from the year 2000 to the year 2017:

Passenger statistics
Year	Average Daily Boarding Passengers	Year	Average Daily Boarding Passengers
2000	912	2010	816
2001	884	2011	802
2002	883	2012	821
2003	901	2013	836
2004	929	2014	777
2005	937	2015	794
2006	876	2016	800
2007	824	2017	797
2008	815		
2009	809		

== Surrounding area ==
- National Route 458
- Yamanobe Town Hall
- Yamanobe High School
- Yamanobe Elementary School
- Yamanobe Onsen
- Su River

== Bus ==
- Yamanobe municipal Bus
