= Nishi-Sagae Station =

Railway station in Sagae, Yamagata Prefecture, Japan

Nishi-Sagae Station 西寒河江駅
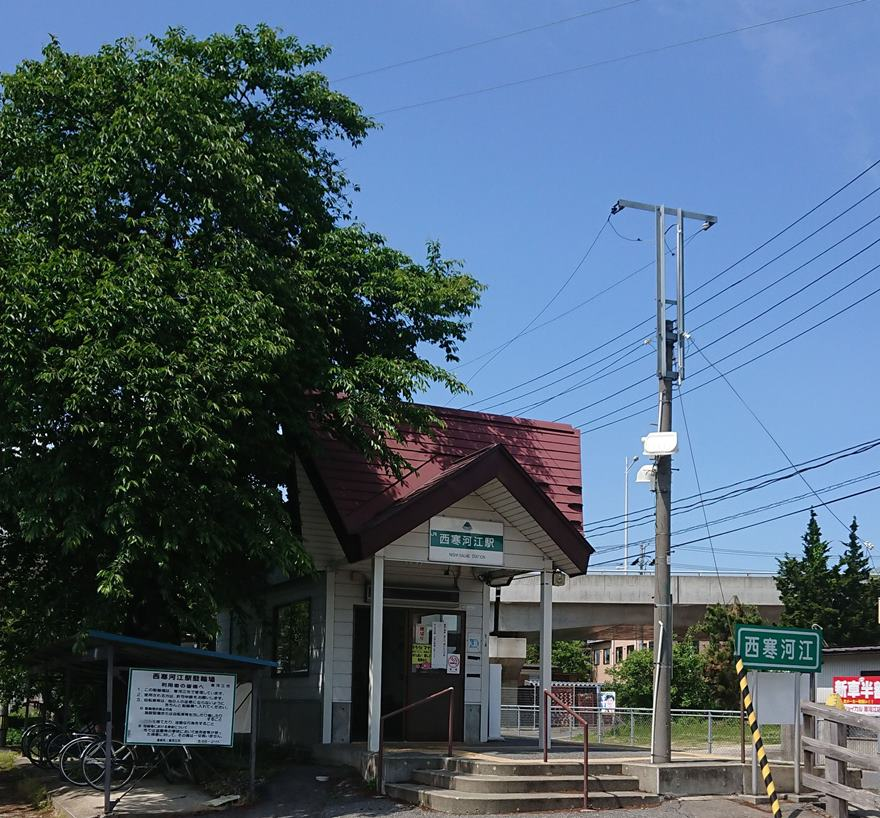
- Nishi-Sagae Station, 2018

General information
- Location: 179, Rokkumachi 1-chōme, Sagae-shi, Yamagata-ken 991-0024; Japan
- Coordinates: 38°22′45″N 140°16′00″E
- Operator: JR East
- Line: Aterazawa Line
- Distance: 16.4 km (10.2 mi) from Kita-Yamagata
- Platforms: 1 side platform

Other information
- Status: Unstaffed
- Website: Official website

History
- Opened: 25 December 1951; 74 years ago

Passengers
- FY2004: 316

Services
Preceding station	JR East	Following station
Uzen-Takamatsu towards Aterazawa	Aterazawa Line	Sagae towards Yamagata
Route map
Location
- Location within Yamagata Prefecture Location within Japan

Nishi-Sagae Station (西寒河江駅, Nishi-Sagae eki) is a railway station located in the city of Sagae, Yamagata Prefecture, Japan, operated by the East Japan Railway Company (JR East).

== Lines ==
Nishi-Sagae Station is served by the Aterazawa Line and is located 16.4 km (10.2 mi) from the start of the line at Kita-Yamagata, and 7.9 km (4.9 mi) from Aterazawa. The preceding station of Sagae is 1.1 km (0.68 mi) away and the following station of Uzen-Takamatsu is 2.9 km (1.8 mi) away.

== Station layout ==
The station has one side platform serving a single bi-directional track. The station is unattended. The station has no accessibility features.

=== Platforms ===
-	■ Aterazawa Line	for Yamagata
-	■ Aterazawa Line	for Aterazawa

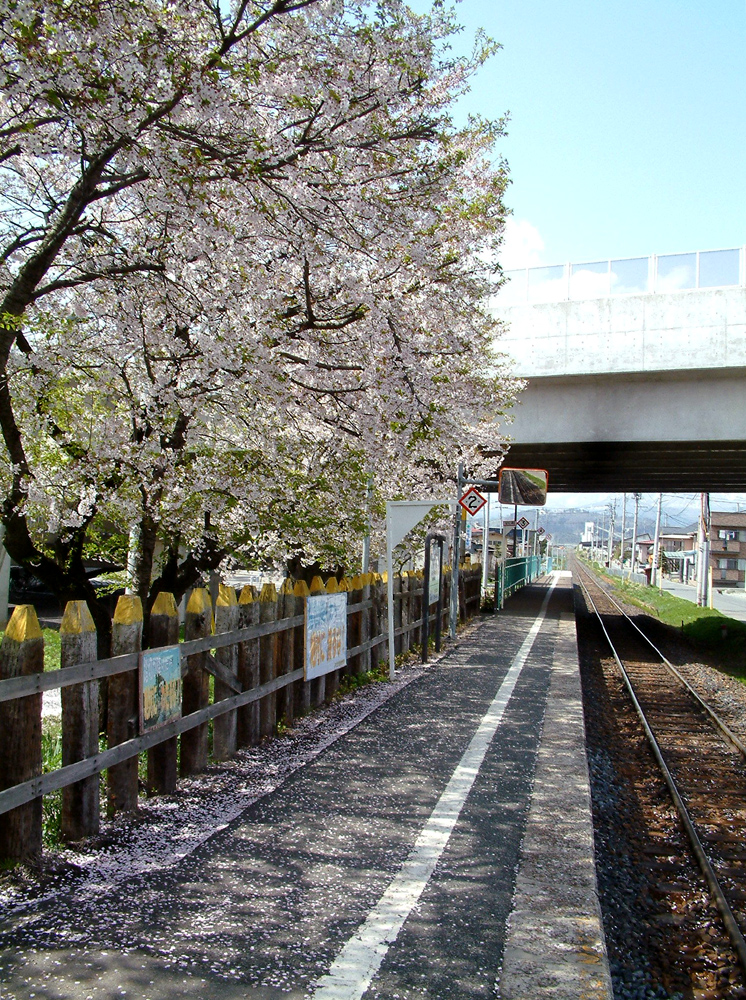
Platform 2006

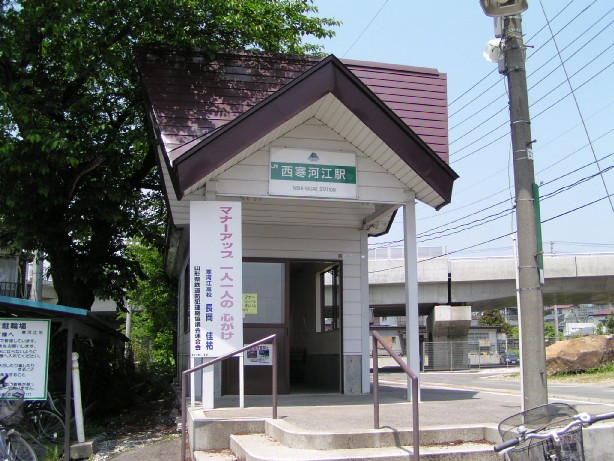
Waiting Room

== History ==
Nishi-Sagae Station began operation on 25 December 1951. With the privatization of the JNR on April 1, 1987, the station came under the control of the East Japan Railway Company. In 2002, a waiting room was built.

== Passenger statistics ==
In fiscal 2004, the station was used by an average of 316 passengers daily. Since 2005, Yamagata Prefecture has not reported the passenger numbers for Nishi-Sagae Station.

Below is table containing the passenger statistics from the year 2000 to the year 2004:

Passenger statistics
Year	Average Daily Passengers
2000	352
2001	310
2002	311
2003	309
2004	316

== Surrounding area ==
- Sagae Hachimangu
- Sagae Park
- Prefecture Route 23
- Prefecture Route 26

== See also ==
- List of railway stations in Japan
