= Higashi-Kanai Station =

Railway station in Yamagata, Yamagata Prefecture, Japan

Higashi-Kanai Station 東金井駅
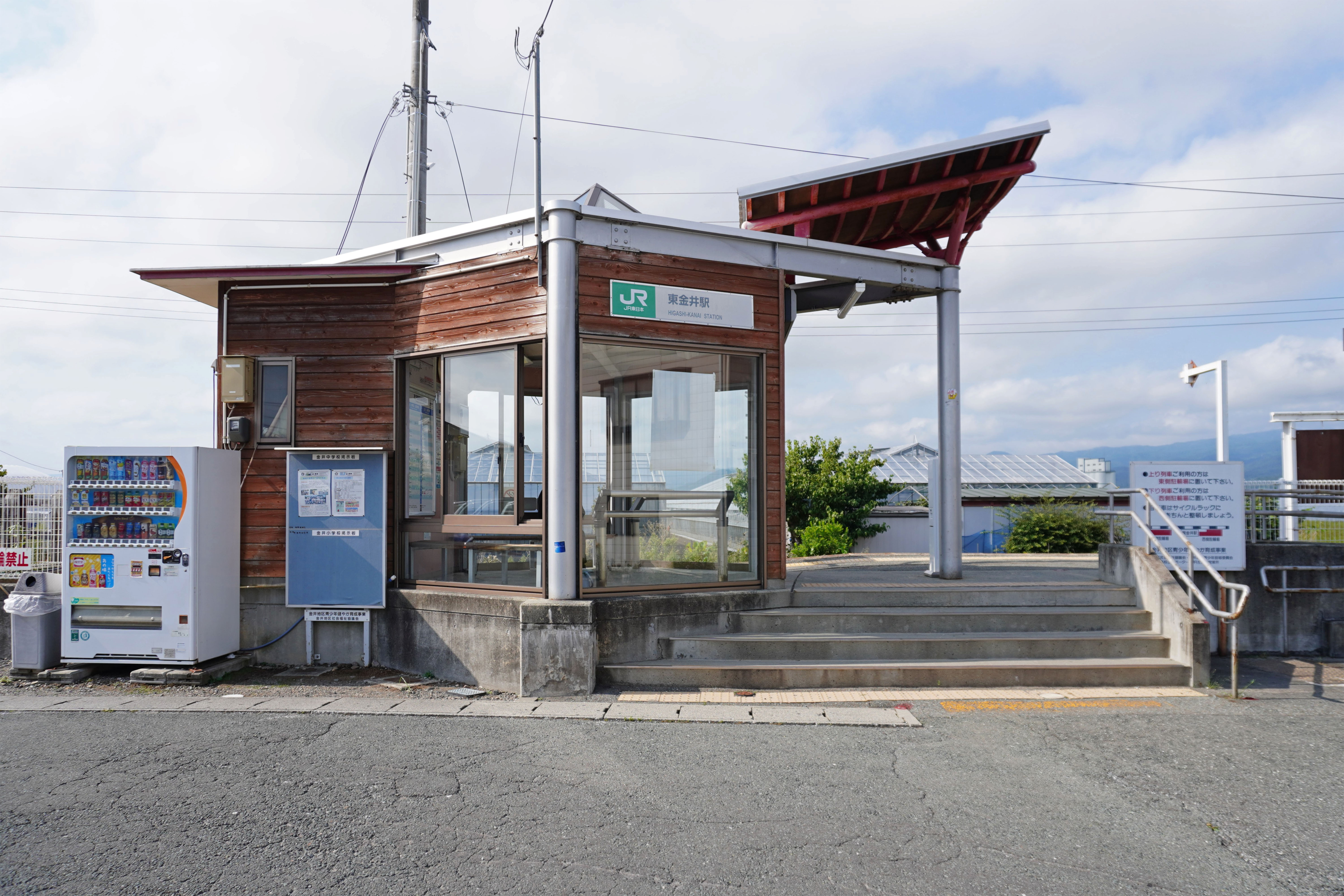
- Higashi-Kanai Station, September 2023

General information
- Location: Jimba 3-chōme, Yamagata-shi, Yamagata-ken 990-0000; Japan
- Coordinates: 38°16′37″N 140°18′10″E
- Operator: JR East
- Line: Aterazawa Line
- Distance: 3.1 km (1.9 mi) from Kita-Yamagata
- Platforms: 1 side platform

Other information
- Status: Unstaffed
- Website: Official website

History
- Opened: 25 December 1951; 74 years ago

Passengers
- FY2004: 171

Services
| Preceding station | JR East | Following station |
|---|---|---|
| Uzen-Yamabe towards Aterazawa | Aterazawa Line | Kita-Yamagata towards Yamagata |
Route map
Location
- Location within Yamagata Prefecture Location within Japan

Higashi-Kanai Station (東金井駅, Higashi-Kanai eki) is a railway station located in the city of Yamagata, Yamagata Prefecture, Japan, operated by the East Japan Railway Company (JR East).

== Lines ==
Higashi-Kanai Station is served by the Aterazawa Line and is located 3.1 km (1.9 mi) from the preceding station and start of the line at Kita-Yamagata, and 21.1 km (13.1 mi) from Aterazawa. The following station of Uzen-Yamabe is 3.4 km (2.1 mi) away.

== Station layout ==
The station has a single side platform serving one bi-directional track. The station is unattended and has no accessibility features.

=== Platforms ===
| - | ■ Aterazawa Line | for Yamagata |
| - | ■ Aterazawa Line | for Aterazawa |

== History ==
Higashi-Kanai Station began operation on December 25, 1951. With the privatization of the JNR on April 1, 1987, the station came under the control of the East Japan Railway Company.

The Station will start accepting Suica Cards in Spring 2024, with the extension of the Sendai area Suica zone to Yamagata Prefecture.

== Passenger statistics ==
In fiscal 2004, the station was used by an average of 171 passengers daily. Since 2005, Yamagata Prefecture has not reported the passenger numbers for Uzen-Kanezawa Station.

Below is table containing the passenger statistics from the year 2000 to the year 2004:

Passenger statistics
| Year | Average Daily Boarding Passengers |
|---|---|
| 2000 | 152 |
| 2001 | 153 |
| 2002 | 157 |
| 2003 | 172 |
| 2004 | 171 |

== Surrounding area ==
- Prefecture Route 49
- National Route 112
- Kanai Junior High School
- Kanai Elementary School

== See also ==
- List of railway stations in Japan
