= Shibahashi Station =

Railway station in Sagae, Yamagata Prefecture, Japan

Shibahashi Station 柴橋駅
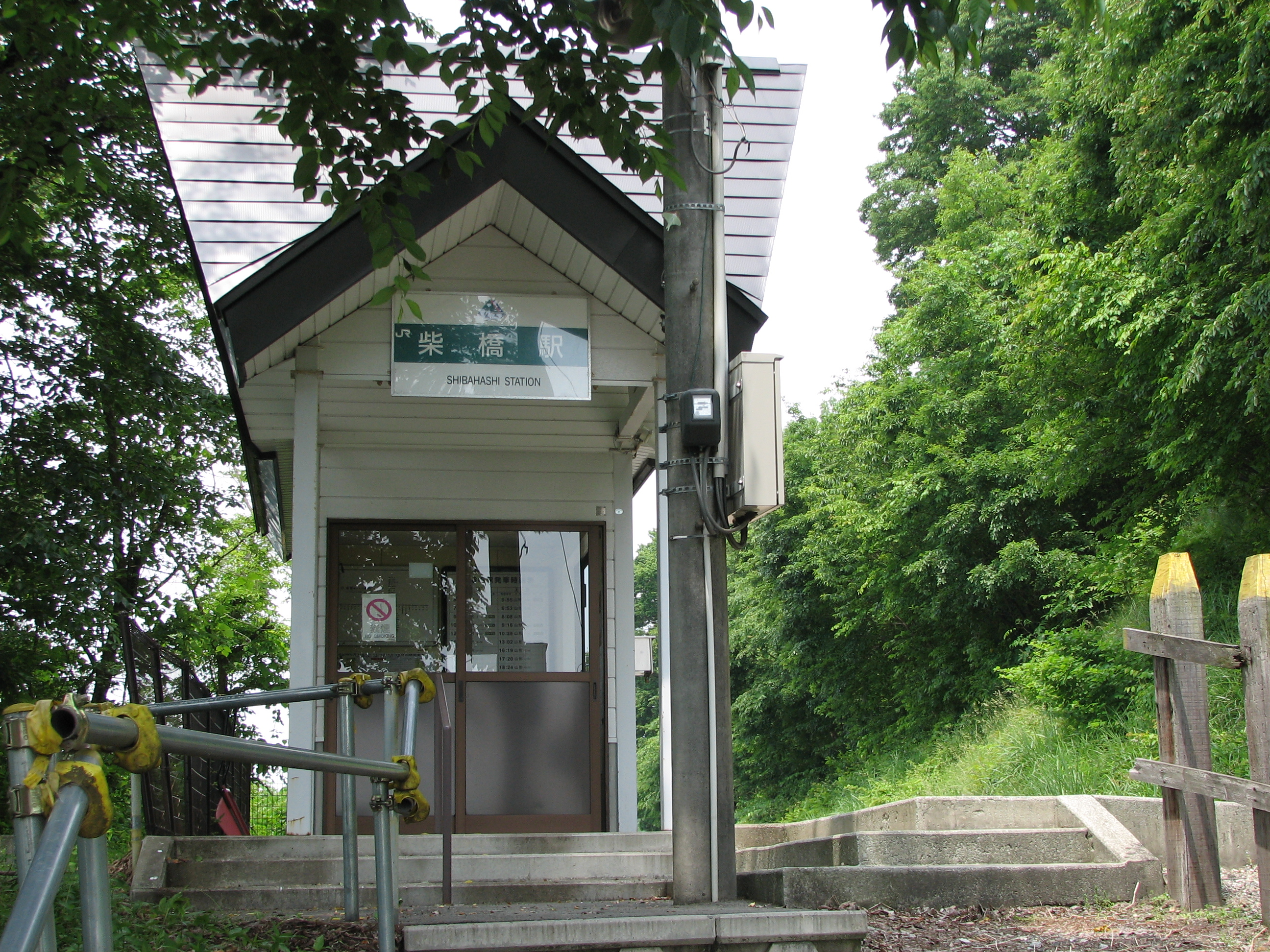
- Shibahashi Station in June 2008

General information
- Location: 453, Ōaza Matsukawa Aza Kinosawa, Sagae-shi, Yamagata-ken; Japan
- Coordinates: 38°22′49″N 140°13′40″E
- Operator: JR East
- Line: Aterazawa Line
- Distance: 22.3 km (13.9 mi) from Kita-Yamagata
- Platforms: 1 side platform

Other information
- Status: Unstaffed
- Website: Official website

History
- Opened: 25 December 1951; 74 years ago

Passengers
- FY2004: 13

Services
Preceding station	JR East	Following station
Aterazawa Terminus	Aterazawa Line	Uzen-Takamatsu towards Yamagata
Route map
Location
- Location within Yamagata Prefecture Location within Japan

Shibahashi Station (柴橋駅, Shibahashi eki) is a railway station located in the city of Sagae, Yamagata Prefecture, Japan, operated by East Japan Railway Company (JR East).

== Lines ==
Shibahashi Station is served by the Aterazawa Line, and is located 22.3 km (13.9 mi) from the start of the line at Kita-Yamagata and 2 km (1.2 mi) from the end of the line at Aterazawa. The preceding station of Uzen-Takamatsu is 3 km (1.9 mi) away.

== Station layout ==
The station has one side platform serving single bi-directional track. The platform is very short, and can only accommodate two carriages. The station is unattended. The station has no accessibility features.

=== Platforms ===
-	■ Aterazawa Line	for Yamagata
-	■ Aterazawa Line	for Aterazawa

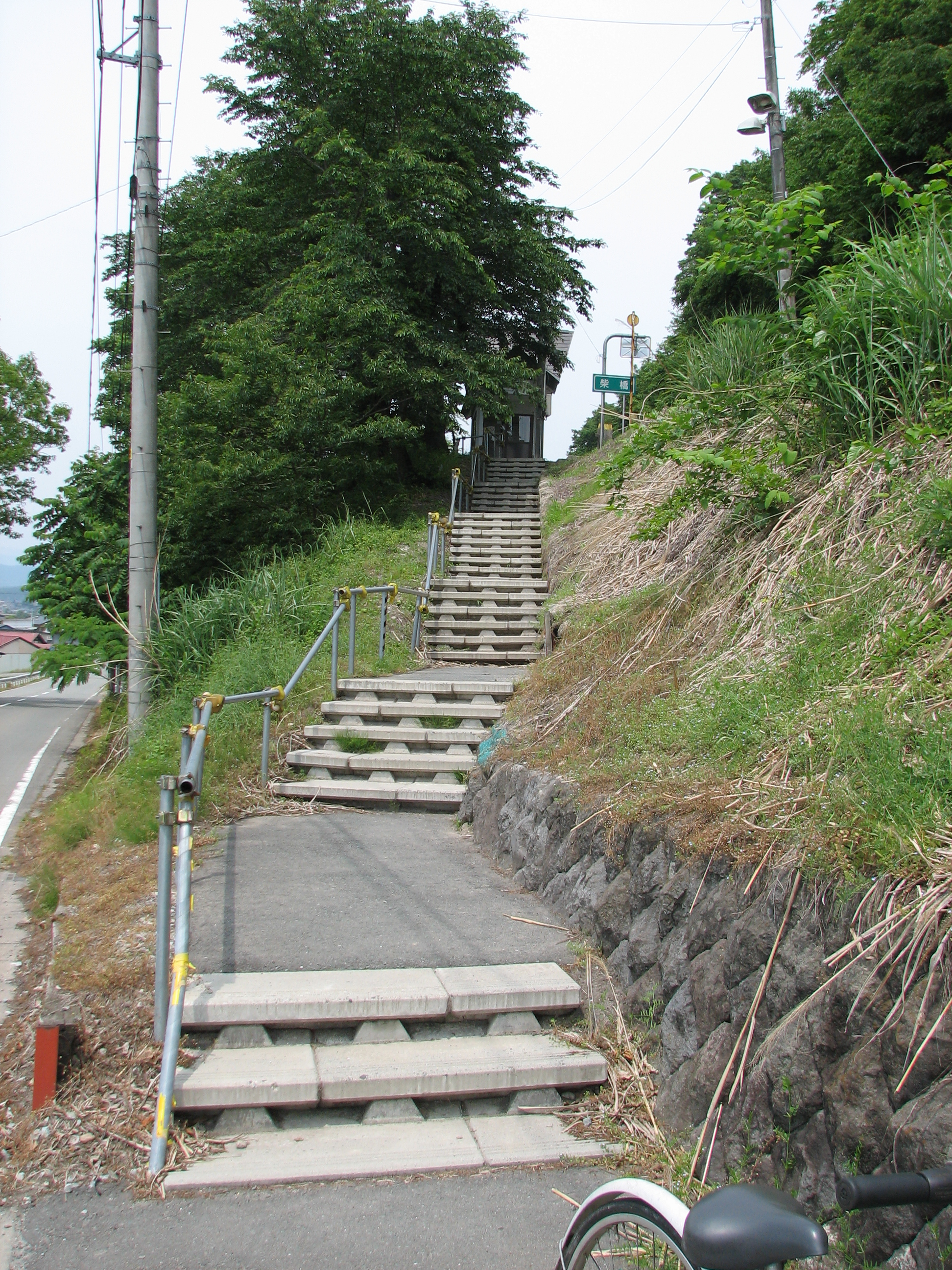
Stairs leading up the platform

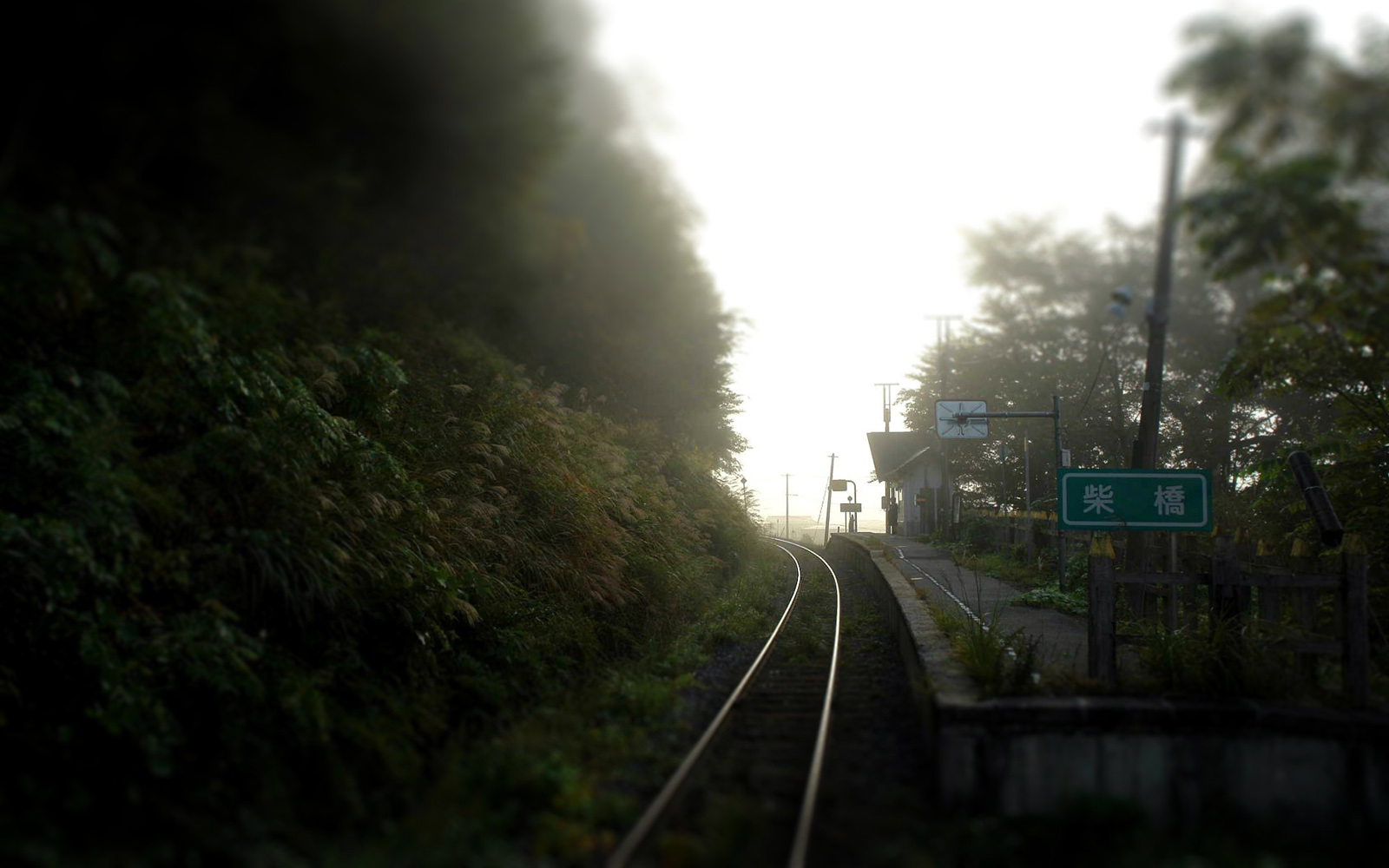
Shibahashi Station Platform 2006

== History ==
Shibahashi Station began operation on 25 December 1951. With the privatization of the JNR on April 1, 1987, the station came under the control of the East Japan Railway Company. In 2002, a waiting room was built.

== Passenger statistics ==
In fiscal 2004, the station was used by an average of 13 passengers daily. Since 2005, Yamagata Prefecture has not reported the passenger numbers for Shibahashi Station.

Below is table containing the passenger statistics from the year 2000 to the year 2004:

Passenger statistics
Year	Average Daily Passengers
2000	19
2001	16
2002	15
2003	13
2004	13

== Surrounding area ==
- Prefecture Route 23
- National Route 287
- Mogami River
- Mt. Hirano

== See also ==
- List of railway stations in Japan
