= Aterazawa Line =

Railway line in Yamagata prefecture, Japan

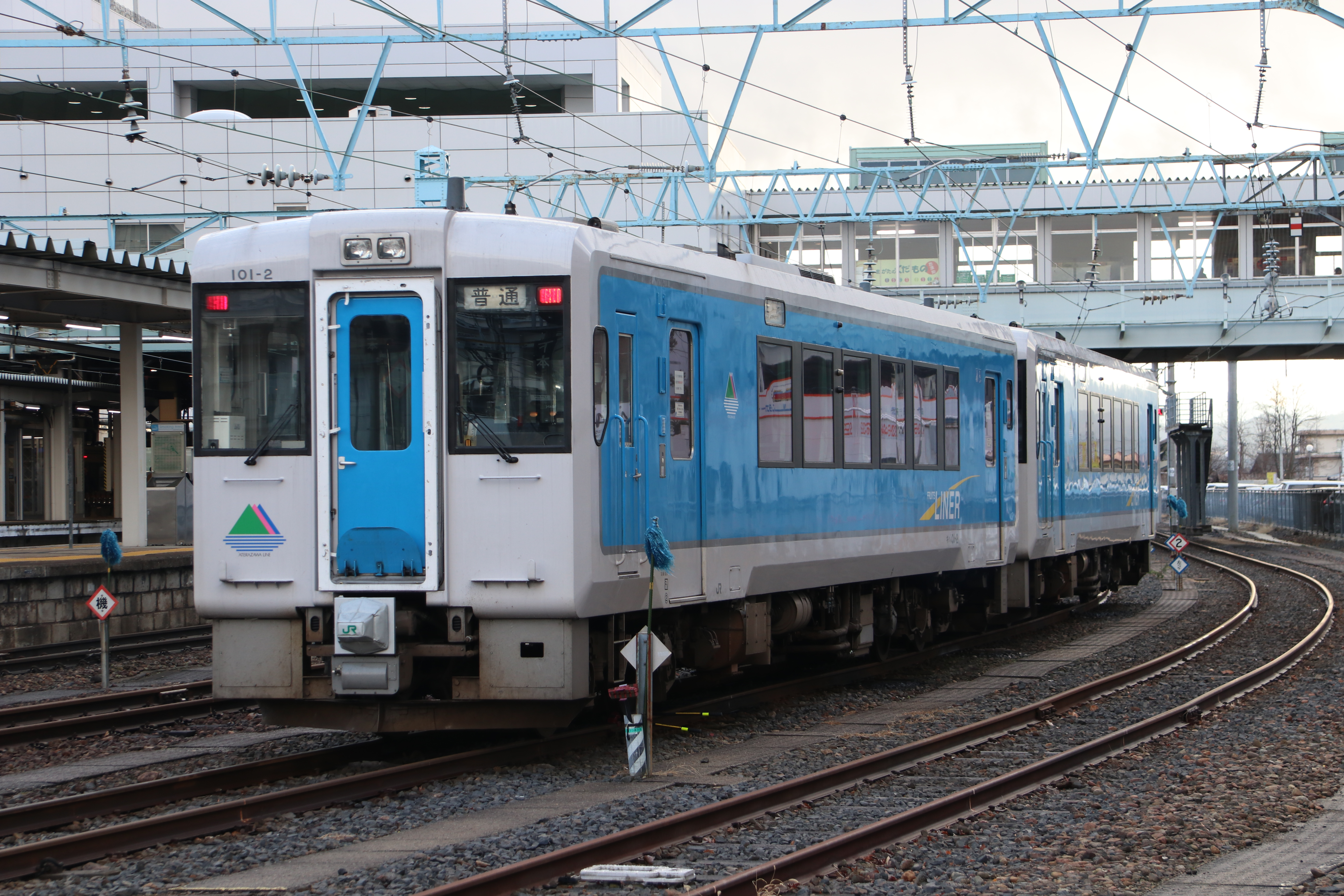
- A KiHa 101 DMU on the Aterazawa Line at Yamagata Station

Overview
- Native name: 左沢線
- Status: In operation
- Owner: JR East
- Locale: Yamagata Prefecture
- Termini: Kita-Yamagata; Aterazawa
- Stations: 11

Service
- Type: Regional rail
- Operator: JR East
- Rolling stock: KiHa 101 DMUs

History
- Opened: 20 July 1921; 105 years ago

Technical
- Line length: 24.3 km (15.1 mi)
- Num of tracks: Entire line single tracked
- Character: Fairly urban with some more rural sections
- Track gauge: 1,067 mm (3 ft 6 in)
- Electrification: None
- Operating speed: 85 km/h (53 mph)

The Aterazawa Line (左沢線, Aterazawa-sen) is a railway line in Yamagata Prefecture, Japan, operated by East Japan Railway Company (JR East). It connects Kita-Yamagata Station in Yamagata with Aterazawa Station in Ōe. All trains run through to and from Yamagata Station.

== Station list ==
- All stations are located in Yamagata Prefecture.
- All trains stop at every station.
- Trains can pass one another at stations marked "◇", "v", and "^".

Station	Japanese	Distance (km)		Transfers		Location
Station	Japanese	Between stations	From Kita-Yamagata	Transfers		Location
Yamagata	山形	-	-1.9	Yamagata Shinkansen; ■ Ōu Main Line (for Yonezawa)	v	Yamagata
Kita-Yamagata	北山形	1.9	0.0	■ Senzan Line; ■ Ōu Main Line (for Shinjō)	◇	Yamagata
Higashi-Kanai	東金井	3.1	3.1		｜	Yamagata
Uzen-Yamabe	羽前山辺	3.4	6.5		◇	Yamanobe, Higashimurayama District
Uzen-Kanezawa	羽前金沢	3.0	9.5		｜	Nakayama, Higashimurayama District
Uzen-Nagasaki	羽前長崎	1.5	11.0		｜	Nakayama, Higashimurayama District
Minami-Sagae	南寒河江	2.5	13.5		｜	Sagae
Sagae	寒河江	1.8	15.3		◇	Sagae
Nishi-Sagae	西寒河江	1.1	16.4		｜	Sagae
Uzen-Takamatsu	羽前高松	2.9	19.3		｜	Sagae
Shibahashi	柴橋	3.0	22.3		｜	Sagae
Aterazawa	左沢	2.0	24.3		｜	Ōe, Nishimurayama District

== Rolling stock ==
- KiHa 101 DMUs

== History ==
The line was opened to Uzen-Nagasaki in 1921, and extended to Aterazawa the following year. CTC signalling was commissioned on the line in 1982.

=== Former connecting lines ===
The Sanzan Electric Railway operated an 11 km line from Uzen-Takamatsu Station to Mazawa, electrified at 600 V DC, between 1926 and 1974.
