= Yamanobe, Yamagata =

Yamanobe 山辺町
- Town
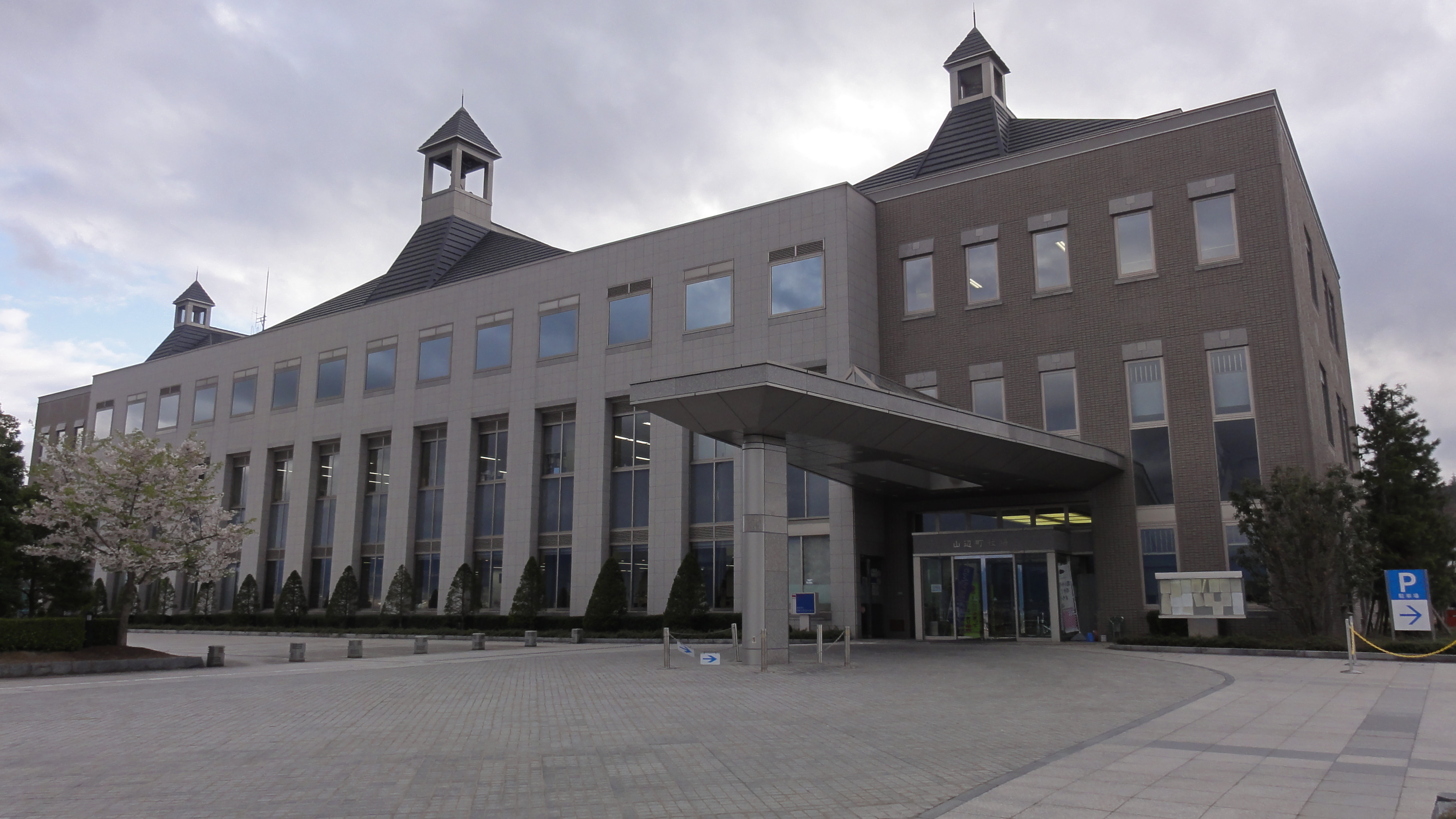
- Yamanobe Town Hall

- Flag Seal

- Location of Yamanobe in Yamagata Prefecture

- Coordinates: 38°17′N 140°16′E
- Country: Japan
- Region: Tōhoku
- Prefecture: Yamagata
- District: Higashimurayama

Area
  - Total: 61.36 km^{2} (23.69 sq mi)

Population (March 2020)
  - Total: 14,147
  - Density: 230.6/km^{2} (597.1/sq mi)
- Time zone: UTC+9 (Japan Standard Time)
- City symbols
  - Tree: Japanese yew
  - Flower: Japanese gentian
  - Bird: Northern goshawk
- Phone number: 023-667-1111
- Address: 5-banchi Midorigaoka, Yamanobe-machi, Nishimurayama-gun, Yamagata-ken 990-0392
- Website: Official website

Yamanobe (山辺町, Yamanobe-machi) is a town located in Yamagata Prefecture, Japan. As of 1 March 2020, the town had an estimated population of 14,174 in 4839 households, and a population density of 230 persons per km^{2}. The total area of the town is 61.36 square kilometres (24 sq mi).

== Geography ==
Yamanobe is located in the southeast end of the Yamagata Basin in central Yamagata Prefecture, surrounded by mountains. Mount Shirataka is partially within the borders of the town.

=== Neighboring municipalities ===
- Yamagata Prefecture
  - Asahi
  - Nakayama
  - Nan'yō
  - Ōe
  - Shirataka
  - Yamagata

=== Climate ===
Yamanobe has a humid continental climate (Köppen climate classification Cfa) with large seasonal temperature differences, with warm to hot (and often humid) summers and cold (sometimes severely cold) winters. Precipitation is significant throughout the year, but is heaviest from August to October. The average annual temperature in Yamanobe is 10.1 °C. The average annual rainfall is 1546 mm with September as the wettest month. The temperatures are highest on average in August, at around 23.9 °C, and lowest in January, at around -2.6 °C.

== Demographics ==
Per Japanese census data, the population of Yamanobe peaked around the year 2000 and has declined since.

Historical population
Year	Pop.	±%
1920	13,884	—
1930	15,037	+8.3%
1940	14,878	−1.1%
1950	17,368	+16.7%
1960	15,881	−8.6%
1970	14,825	−6.6%
1980	14,281	−3.7%
1990	15,016	+5.1%
2000	15,521	+3.4%
2010	15,139	−2.5%
2020	13,725	−9.3%

== History ==
The area of present-day Yamanobe was part of ancient Dewa Province. After the start of the Meiji period, the area became part of Higashimurayama District, Yamagata Prefecture. The village of Yamanobe was established on April 1, 1889, with the creation of the modern municipalities system. It was elevated to town status in 1896.

== Economy ==
The economy of Yamanobe is based on agriculture.

== Education ==
Yamanobe has three public elementary schools and two public middle schools operated by the town government, and one public high school operated by the Yamagata Prefectural Board of Education.

== Transportation ==
=== Railway ===
East Japan Railway Company - Aterazawa Line

- Uzen-Yamabe

=== Highway ===
- Tōhoku Chūō Expressway: Yamagata Chūō interchange
- National Route 485

== Local attractions ==
- Site of Yamanobe Castle

== Noted people from Yamanobe ==
- Mineichirō Adachi, diplomat and legal scholar
- Kazunobu Mineta, musician and actor
