= Jion-ji (Sagae) =

Buddhist temple in Sagae, Yamagata, Japan

Jion-ji 慈恩寺
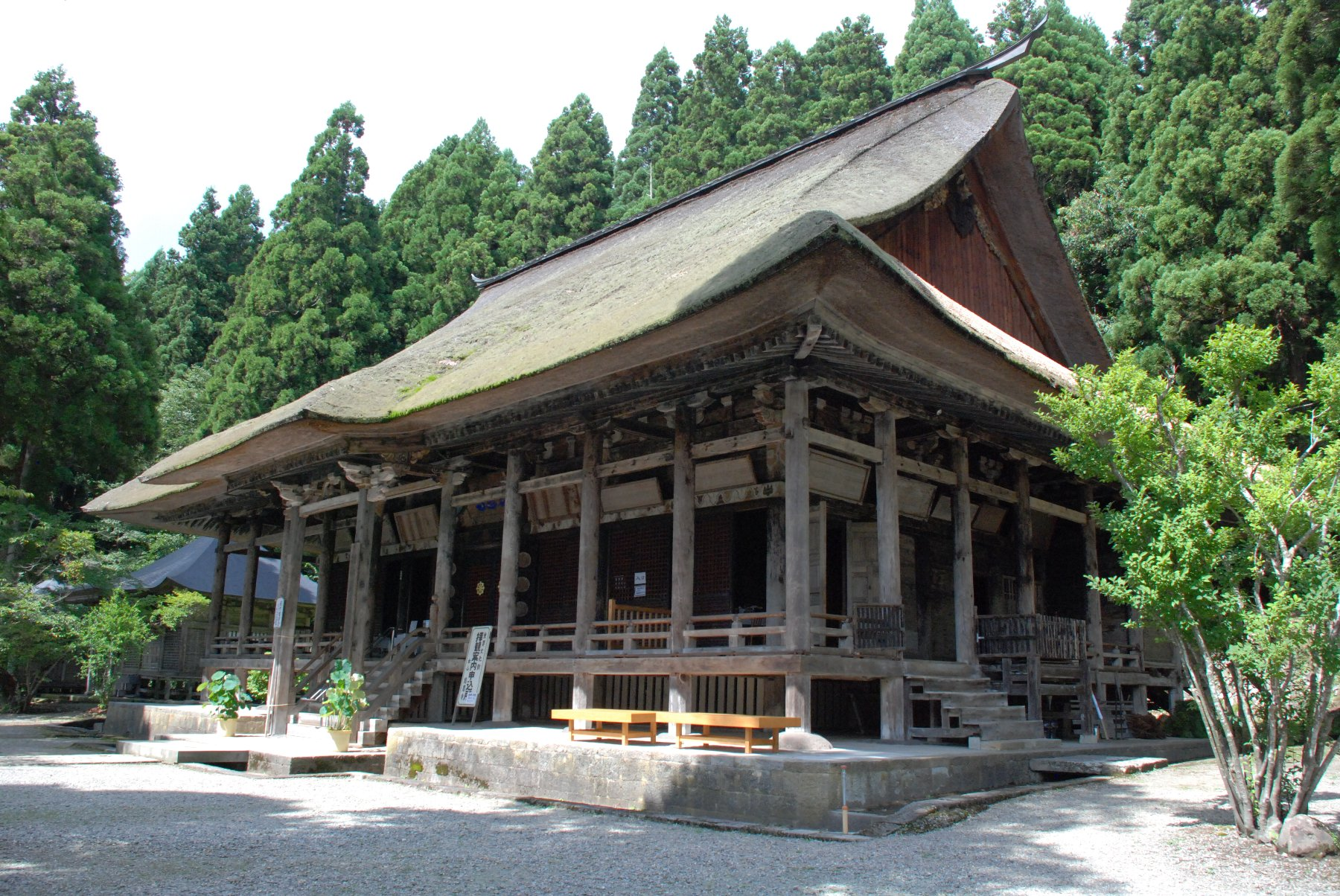
- Jion-ji Hondo

- Location within Yamagata Prefecture Location within Japan

Religion
- Affiliation: Buddhist
- Deity: Miroku Bosatsu
- Rite: Hossō
- Status: functional

Location
- Location: Sagae, Yamagata
- Country: Japan
- Coordinates: 38°24′36.9″N 140°15′3.2″E

Architecture
- Founder: c.Gyōki
- Completed: c. 724 AD

Website
- Official website

Jion-ji (慈恩寺), (山号 宝珠山; Sangō Zuihō-zan) is a major Buddhist temple located in the city of Sagae, in Yamagata Prefecture, Japan. Its main image is a hibutsu statue of Miroku Bosatsu. The temple has been a place for pilgrimage for centuries, and is designated as a National Historic Site in 2014 It occupies a mountain overlooking the Yamagata basin, and its main gate is at an altitude of 146 meters.

== History ==
According to temple tradition, it was founded in 724 AD by the wandering holy monk Gyōki, by order of Emperor Shomu to spread Buddhism in remote Dewa Province. However, there is no documentary evidence to back this claim, and almost all Buddhist temples of the time were built on the plains rather than on a mountain. Furthermore, mountain temples and the worship of Miroku Bosatsu did not become common until the early Heian period. Although the Hossō sect is often associated with the Nara period, Hossō missionaries were most active in northern Japan during the Heian period, reaching Aizu in the first half of the 9th century and Dewa shortly afterwards. In any event, the temple was large and well-patronized by the Fujiwara clan and by Emperor Go-Toba, Emperor Go-Shirakawa and others during the mid-Heian period. The surrounding territory was a shōen controlled by the Taira clan. The temple changed from the Hossō sect to the Tendai sect, to the Shingon sect depending on the belief of its main patrons at the time.

During the Kamakura period, Sagae shōen passed to Ōe no Hiromoto, one of the main retainers of Minamoto no Yoritomo, and Jion-ji became a bodaiji of the Oe clan. The temple was burned down several times during the wars of the Nanboku-chō period between the Shiba clan, Mogami clan and Date clans, but was rebuilt each time. During the Edo Period, the temple was the largest in Dewa Province and had 48 chapels in three mountains and extensive estates for its upkeep. However, with the Meiji restoration and the subsequent anti-Buddhism movement, the temple suffered greatly and was reduced to 17 chapels. It lost its estates, and as a temple dedicated to prayers for the former Tokugawa shogunate, it had no regular parishioners for support. The temple survived and began to revive from 1910. From 1972, it became a center for syncretic Buddhism, incorporating the beliefs and rituals of Hossō, Tendai and Shingon.

== Important cultural properties ==
- Building: Hondō, built by the Mogami clan in 1617, a 7 x 5 bay hall with irimoya-zukuri roof
- Statue: Miroku Bosatsu and 4 attendants, carved in 1298
- Statue: Shaka Nyōrai and 9 attendants, carved in the Heian period
- Statue: Yakushi Nyōrai and 2 attendants, carved in 1310
- Statue: Shotoku Taishi, carved 1314
- Statue:Junshi Shinsho, 8 from the Kamakura period, 4 statues from the Edo period

Numerous other buildings and statues at Jion-ji are Yamagata Prefectural Important Cultural Properties. In total, the temple as It conveys 14 statues created during the Heian period and 29 from the Kamakura period.

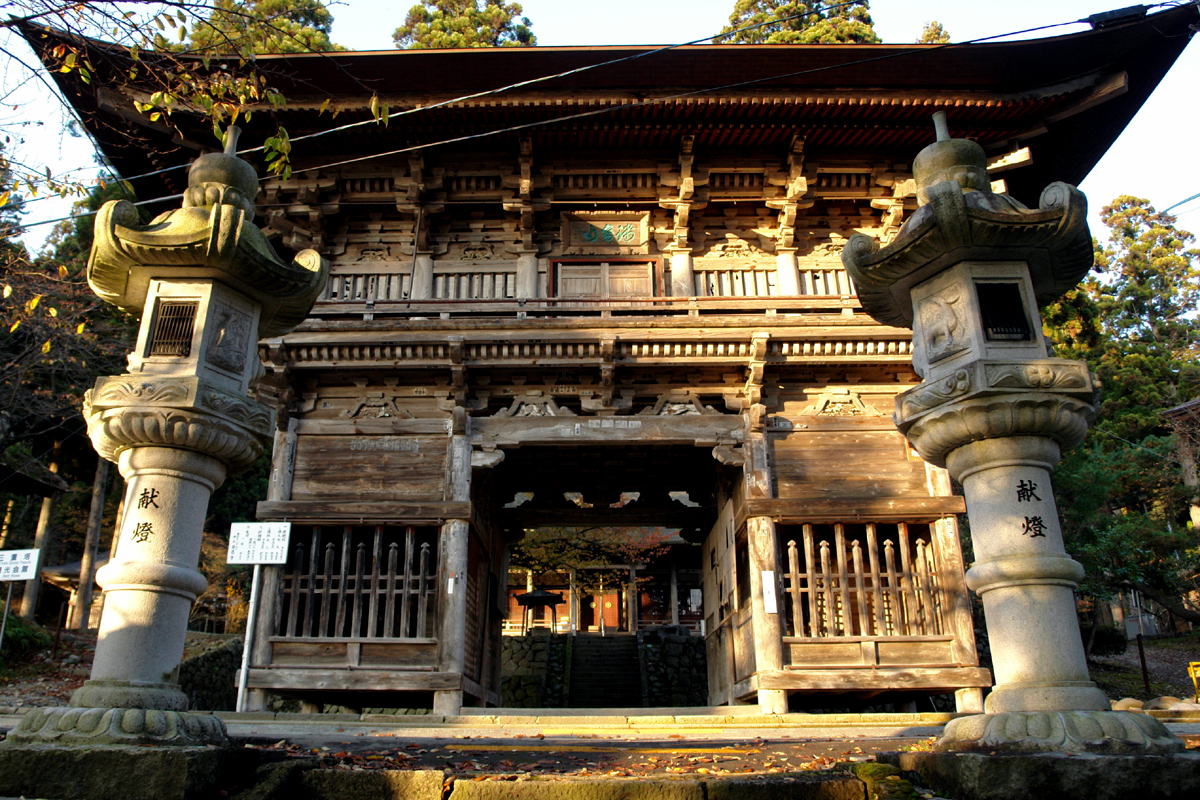
Niomon

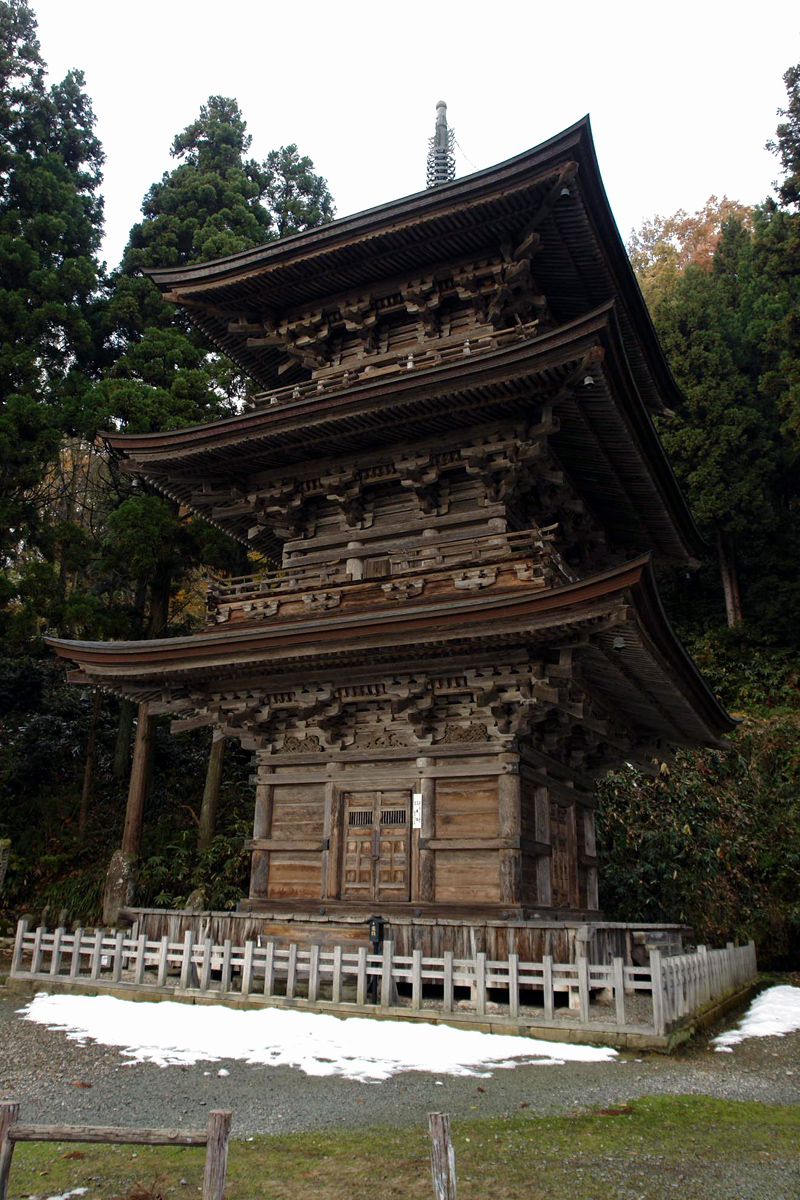
Three-story Pagoda

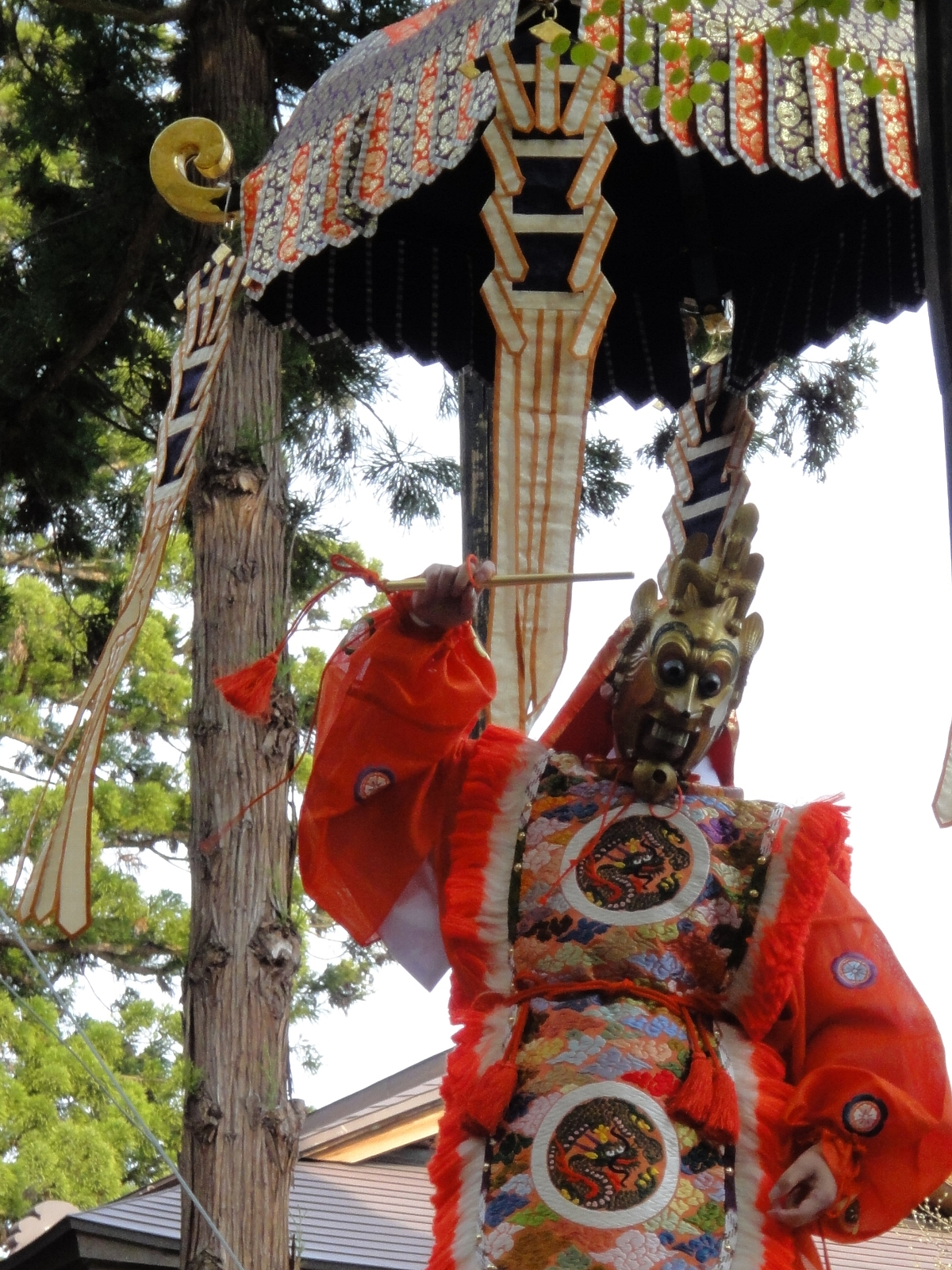
Bungaku at Jion-ji

== See also ==
- List of Historic Sites of Japan (Yamagata)
