= Nakayama, Yamagata =

Nakayama 中山町
- Town
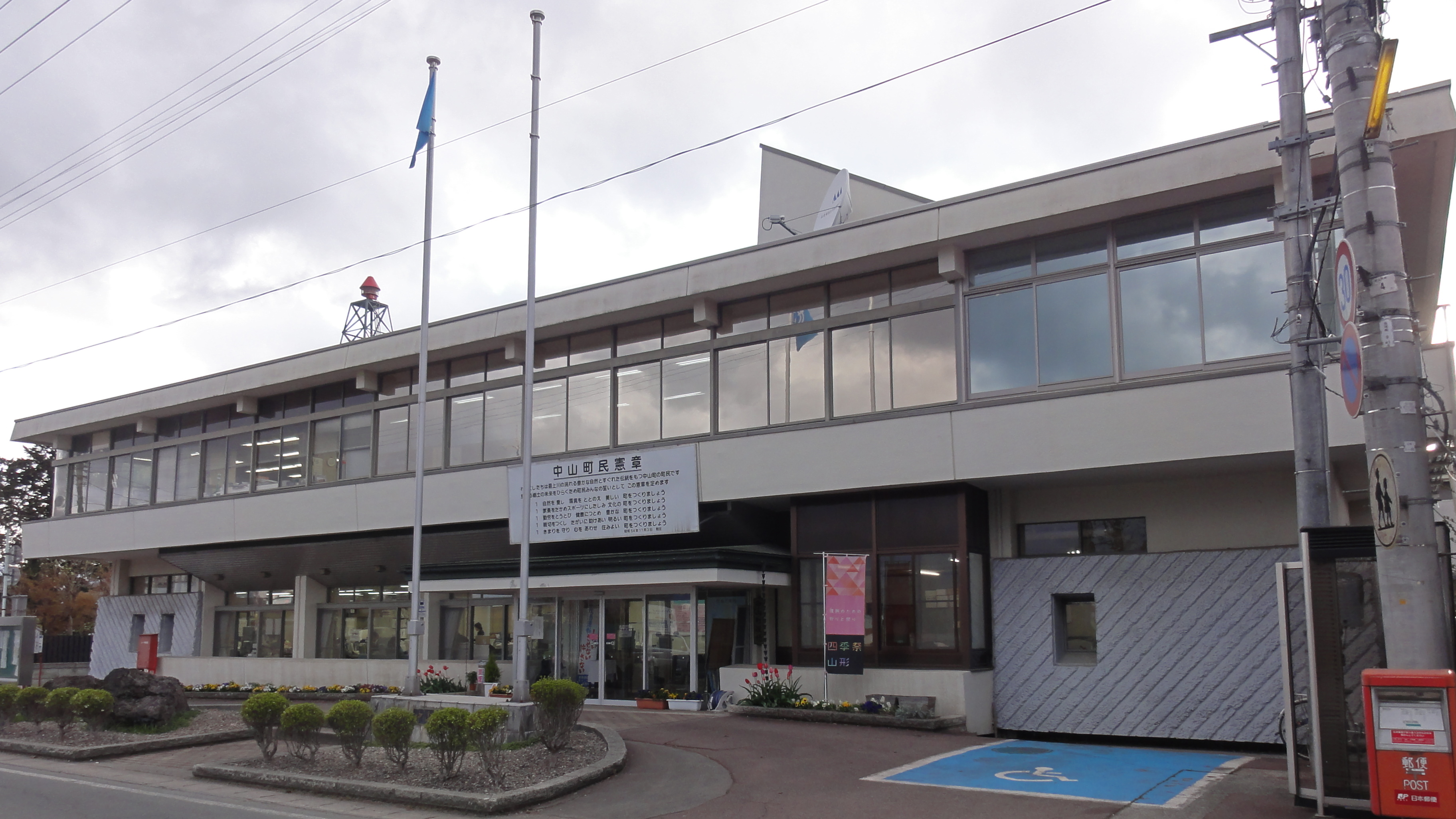
- Nakayama Town Hall

- Flag Seal

- Location of Nakayama in Yamagata Prefecture

- Coordinates: 38°19′59.3″N 140°16′59″E
- Country: Japan
- Region: Tōhoku
- Prefecture: Yamagata
- District: Higashimurayama

Area
  - Total: 31.23 km^{2} (12.06 sq mi)

Population (February 2020)
  - Total: 11,153
  - Density: 357.1/km^{2} (924.9/sq mi)
- Time zone: UTC+9 (Japan Standard Time)
- Tree: Ginkgo biloba
- Flower: Sunflower
- Phone number: 023- 662-2111
- Address: 120 Nagasaki, Nakayama-machi, Nishimurayama-gun, Yamagata-ken 990-0492
- Website: Official website

Nakayama (中山町, Nakayama-machi) is a town located in Yamagata Prefecture, Japan. As of 29 February 2020, the town had an estimated population of 11,153 in 3701 households, and a population density of 360 persons per km^{2}. The total area of the town is 31.23 square kilometres (12 sq mi).

== Geography ==
Nakayama is located in the western end of the Yamagata Basin in central Yamagata Prefecture, surrounded by mountains. The Mogami River flows through the town.

=== Neighboring municipalities ===
- Yamagata Prefecture
  - Ōe
  - Sagae
  - Tendō
  - Yamagata
  - Yamanobe

=== Climate ===
Nakayama has a humid continental climate (Köppen climate classification Cfa) with large seasonal temperature differences, with warm to hot (and often humid) summers and cold (sometimes severely cold) winters. Precipitation is significant throughout the year, but is heaviest from August to October. The average annual temperature in Nakayama is 11.7 °C. The average annual rainfall is 1398 mm with September as the wettest month. The temperatures are highest on average in August, at around 25.6 °C, and lowest in January, at around -1.1 °C.

== Demographics ==
Per Japanese census data, the population of Nakayama has remained relatively steady over the past 50 years.

Historical population
Year	Pop.	±%
1920	10,532	—
1930	12,037	+14.3%
1940	12,367	+2.7%
1950	14,098	+14.0%
1960	12,815	−9.1%
1970	11,597	−9.5%
1980	11,624	+0.2%
1990	11,773	+1.3%
2000	12,573	+6.8%
2010	12,015	−4.4%
2020	10,746	−10.6%

== History ==
The area of present-day Nakayama was part of ancient Dewa Province. After the start of the Meiji period, the area became part of Higashimurayama District, Yamagata Prefecture. The town of Nakayama was established on October 1, 1954, by the merger of the town of Nagasaki with the village of Mogami.

== Economy ==
The economy of Nakayama is based on agriculture.

== Education ==
Nakayama has two public elementary schools and one public middle school operated by the town government. The town does not have a high school.

== Transportation ==
=== Railway ===
East Japan Railway Company - Aterazawa Line

- Uzen-Kanezawa - Uzen-Nagasaki

=== Highway ===
- Yamagata Expressway
- National Route 112
- National Route 485
