= Sagae =

Sagae 寒河江市
- City
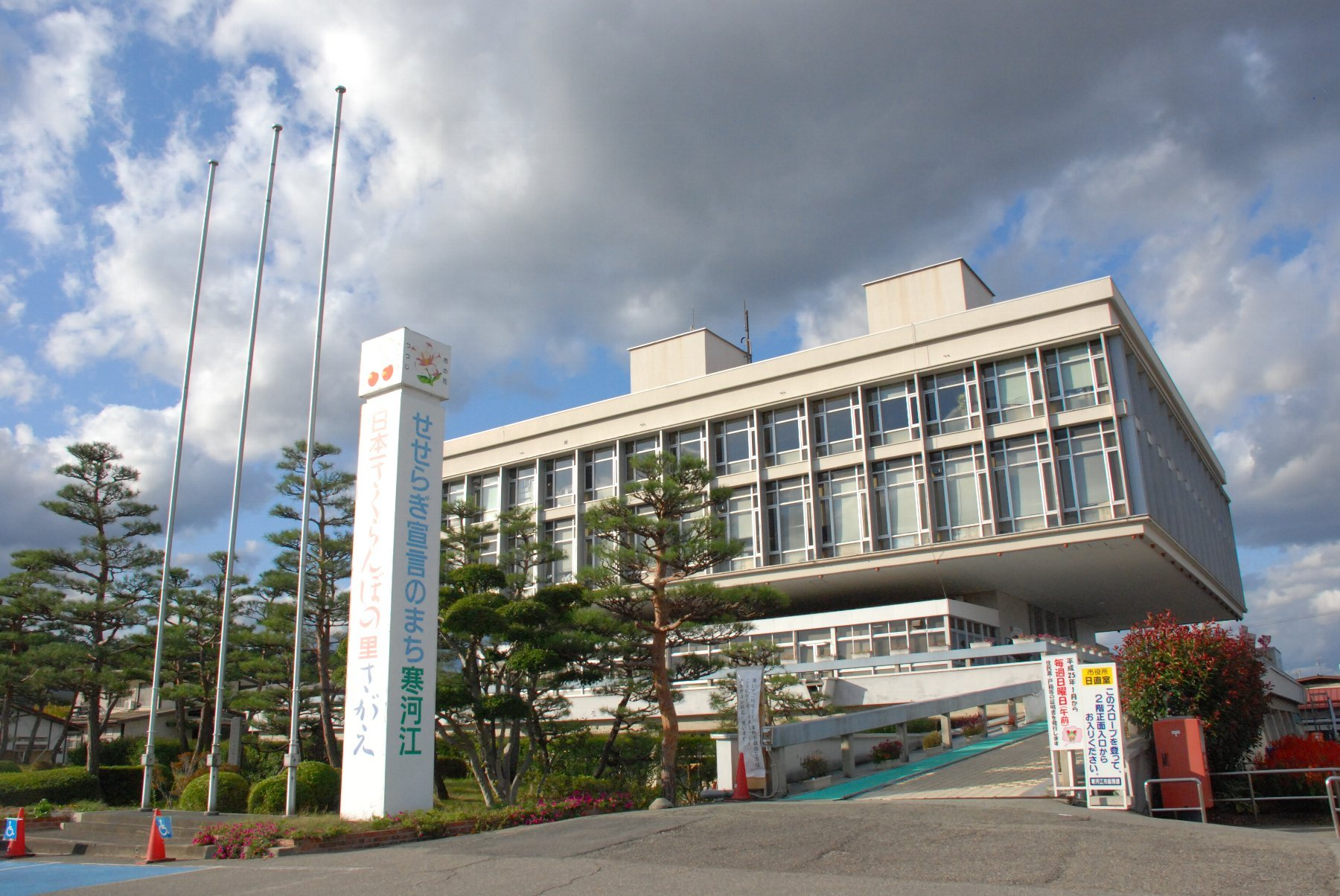
- Sagae City Hall

- Flag Seal

- Location of Sagae in Yamagata Prefecture

- Coordinates: 38°22′51.3″N 140°16′33.7″E
- Country: Japan
- Region: Tōhoku
- Prefecture: Yamagata
- Village settled: April 1, 1889
- Town settled: January 7, 1893
- City settled: August 1, 1954

Government
  - Mayor: Masaaki Saitō (斎藤英朗) - from January 2025

Area
  - Total: 139.03 km^{2} (53.68 sq mi)

Population (January 2020)
  - Total: 40,131
  - Density: 288.65/km^{2} (747.60/sq mi)
- Time zone: UTC+9 (Japan Standard Time)
- Tree: Cherry
- Flower: Azalea
- Plant: Sagae Gibōshi (Hosta ‘Sagae’)
- -Fish: Ayu
- Phone number: 0237-86-2111
- Address: 1-9-45 Chūō, Sagae-shi, Yamagata-ken 991-8601
- Website: Official website

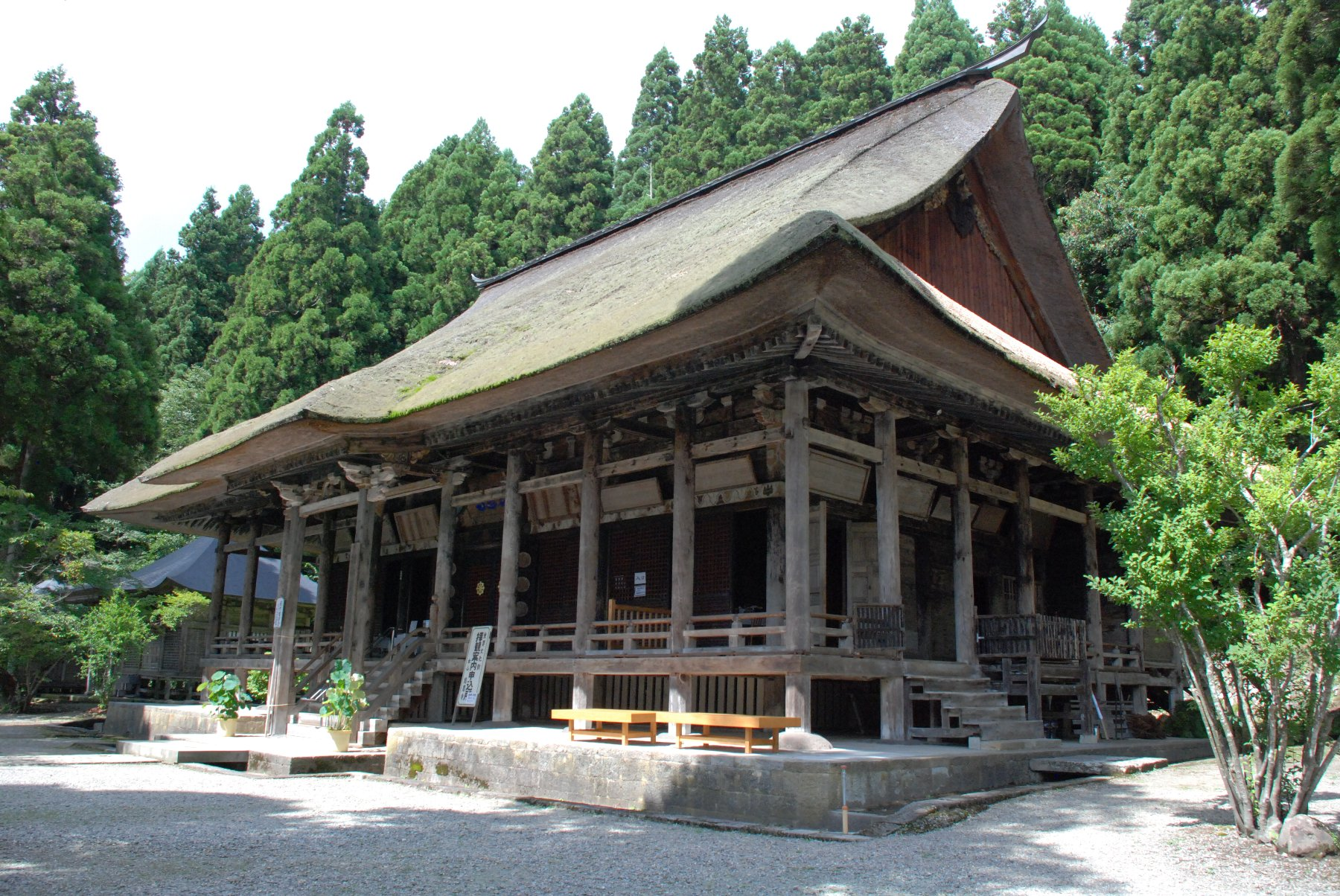
Jion-in temple

Sagae (寒河江市, Sagae-shi) is a city located in Yamagata Prefecture, Japan. As of 1 January 2020, the city had an estimated population of 40,131, and a population density of 289 persons per km^{2}. The total area of the city is 139.03 square kilometres (54 sq mi).

== Geography ==
Sagae is located in the Yamagata Basin in the geographic center of Yamagata Prefecture. The Asahi Mountains and Dewa Mountains form its western border, and the Mogami River forms the eastern border of the city.

=== Neighboring municipalities ===
- Yamagata Prefecture
  - Kahoku
  - Murayama
  - Nakayama
  - Nishikawa
  - Ōe
  - Ōkura
  - Tendo

=== Climate ===
Sagae has a humid continental climate (Köppen climate classification Dfb) with large seasonal temperature differences, with warm to hot (and often humid) summers and cold (sometimes severely cold) winters. Precipitation is significant throughout the year, but is heaviest from August to October. The average annual temperature in Sagae is 8.2 °C. The average annual rainfall is 1579 mm with September as the wettest month. The temperatures are highest on average in August, at around 21.3 °C, and lowest in January, at around -4.1 °C.

== Demographics ==
Per Japanese census data, the population of Sagae has remained relatively steady over the past 60 years.

Historical population
| Year | Pop. | ±% |
|---|---|---|
| 1960 | 40,015 | — |
| 1970 | 38,558 | −3.6% |
| 1980 | 41,048 | +6.5% |
| 1990 | 42,076 | +2.5% |
| 2000 | 43,379 | +3.1% |
| 2010 | 42,373 | −2.3% |
| 2020 | 40,189 | −5.2% |

== History ==
The area of present-day Sagae was part of ancient Dewa Province, and has been settled since prehistoric times, with numerous archaeological findings from the Japanese Paleolithic through the Kofun periods. In the late Heian through Kamakura periods, it was a shōen under the control of the Ōe clan. The Ōe were destroyed by the Mogami clan in the Sengoku period, who were in turn destroyed by the Tokugawa shogunate in the early Edo period. The territory was administered as tenryō under direct control of the shogunate until the Meiji Restoration, and was briefly a battleground in the Boshin War. After the start of the Meiji period, the area became part of Nishimurayama District, Yamagata Prefecture. The village of Sagae was established on April 1, 1889, with the creation of the modern municipalities system, and was raised to town status on January 7, 1893. It became a city on August 1, 1954.

== Government ==
Sagae has a mayor-council form of government with a directly elected mayor and a unicameral city legislature of 16 members. The city contributes two members to the Yamagata Prefectural Assembly. In terms of national politics, the city is part of Yamagata District 2 of the lower house of the Diet of Japan.

== Economy ==
The economy of Sagae is primarily based on agriculture and food processing, including sake breweries.

== Education ==
Sagae has nine public elementary schools and three public middle schools operated by the city government and two public high schools operated by the Yamagata Prefectural Board of Education.

== Transportation ==
=== Railway ===
East Japan Railway Company - Aterazawa Line

- Minami-Sagae - Sagae - Nishi-Sagae - Uzen-Takamatsu - Shibahashi

=== Highway ===
- Yamagata Expressway: Sagae interchange; Sagae parking area (ETC exit gate)
- National Route 112
- National Route 287
- National Route 347
- National Route 458

== Local attractions ==
- Cherryland, a michi no eki. Yamagata Prefecture is the largest producer of cherries in Japan.
- Jion-ji temple, National Historic Site
- Sagae Onsen

== Sister cities ==
- Giresun, Turkey, since June 25, 1988
- Andong, South Korea, since February 4, 1974

== Noted people from Sagae ==
- Hiroh Kikai, photographer
