= Kita-Yamagata Station =

Railway station in Yamagata, Yamagata Prefecture, Japan

Kita-Yamagata Station 北山形駅
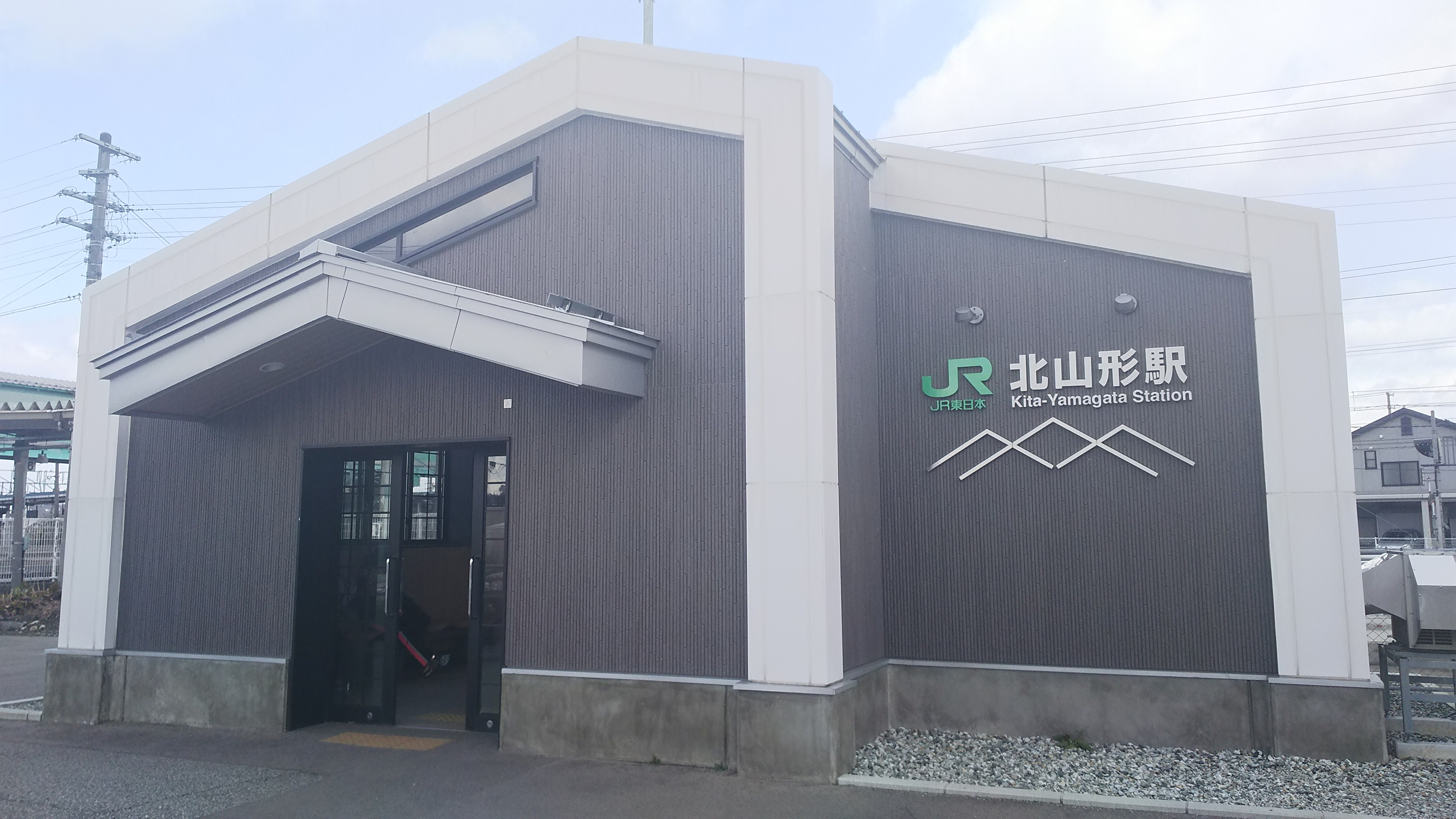
- West entrance in March 2017

General information
- Location: 1-7 Kitamachi; Yamagata, Yamagata; Japan
- Coordinates: 38°15′57″N 140°19′58″E
- Operator: JR East
- Lines: Ōu Main Line; Aterazawa Line
- Distance: 89.0 km from Fukushima
- Platforms: 1 island + 4 side platforms

Other information
- Status: Staffed (Midori no Madoguchi)

History
- Opened: 20 July 1921

Passengers
- FY2018: 1,590 daily

Services
Preceding station	JR East	Following station
Yamagata towards Fukushima	Yamagata Line	Uzen-Chitose towards Shinjō
Yamagata Terminus	Senzan Line Rapid A B C Local	Uzen-Chitose towards Sendai
Yamagata Terminus	Aterazawa Line	Higashi-Kanai towards Aterazawa
Route map
Location
- Location within Yamagata Prefecture Location within Japan

Kita-Yamagata Station (Japanese: 北山形駅, Hepburn: Kita-Yamagata-eki) is a railway station in the city of Yamagata, Yamagata Prefecture, Japan, operated by East Japan Railway Company (JR East).

== Lines ==
Kita-Yamagata Station is served by the Ōu Main Line and Senzan Line, and is located 89.0 rail kilometers from the starting point of the Ōu Main Line at Fukushima Station. It also forms the terminus for the Aterazawa Line.

== Station layout ==
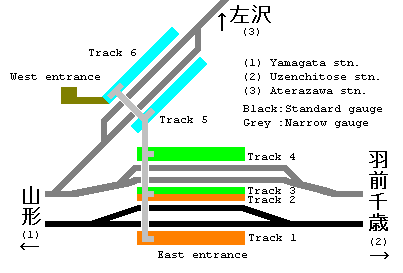
Track diagram

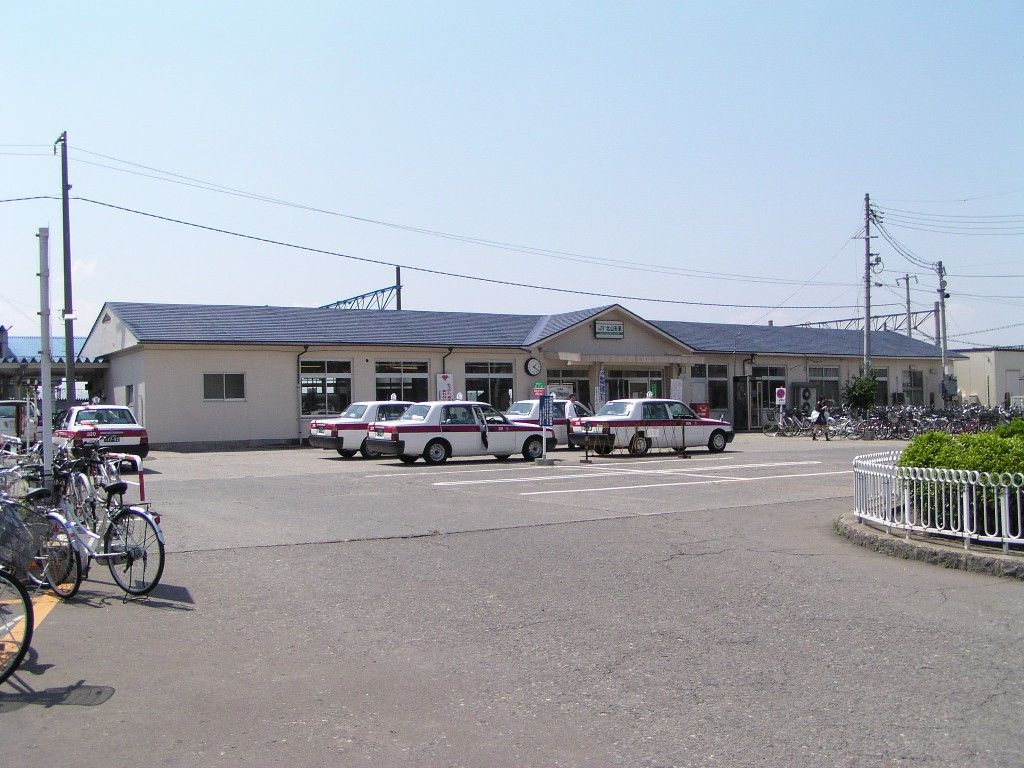
East entrance, May 2005

The station is arranged in a Y-shaped configuration. The Ōu Main Line is served by a side platform and one side of an island platform. The other side of the island platform and an additional side platform are used by the Senzan Line. The Aterazawa Line connects to the station with a pair of opposed side platforms at an angle to the station building.

The station has a Midori no Madoguchi staffed ticket office.

=== Platforms ===
1	■ Yamagata Line	for Shinjō or Fukushima
2	■ Yamagata Line	not in regular use
3	■ Senzan Line	for Yamagata or Sendai
4	■ Senzan Line	not in regular use
5	■ Aterazawa Line	for Yamagata
6	■ Aterazawa Line	for Yamagata or Aterazawa

== History ==
Kita-Yamagata Station opened on 20 July 1921 as a station on the Aterazawa light railway line. Services on the Ōu Main Line began on 11 September 1927 and on the Senzan West Line from 17 October 1933. The station was absorbed into the JR East network upon the privatization of JNR on 1 April 1987.

== Passenger statistics ==
In fiscal 2018, the station was used by an average of 1590 passengers daily (boarding passengers only). The passenger figures for previous years are as shown below.

Fiscal year	Daily average
2000	1,647
2005	1,662
2010	1,621
2015	1,554

== Surrounding area ==
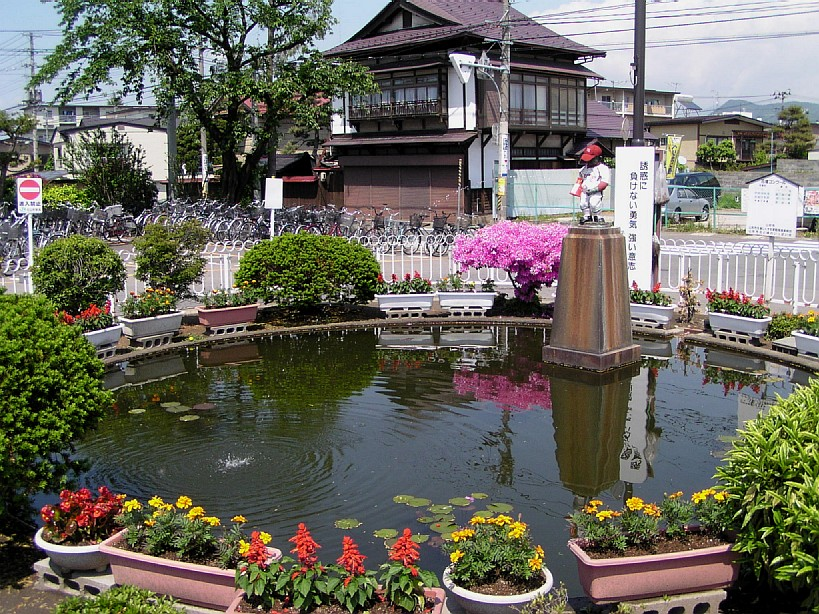
A kind of Manneken Pis in front of the east entrance

- Manneken Pis in front of the east entrance
- Yamagata Civic Athletic Field
- Yamagata-ken Gokoku Shrine
- Chōkai gassan ryōsho-gu Shrine
- Yamazawa grocery store Miyamachi location
- 7-11 convenience store

== Photos ==
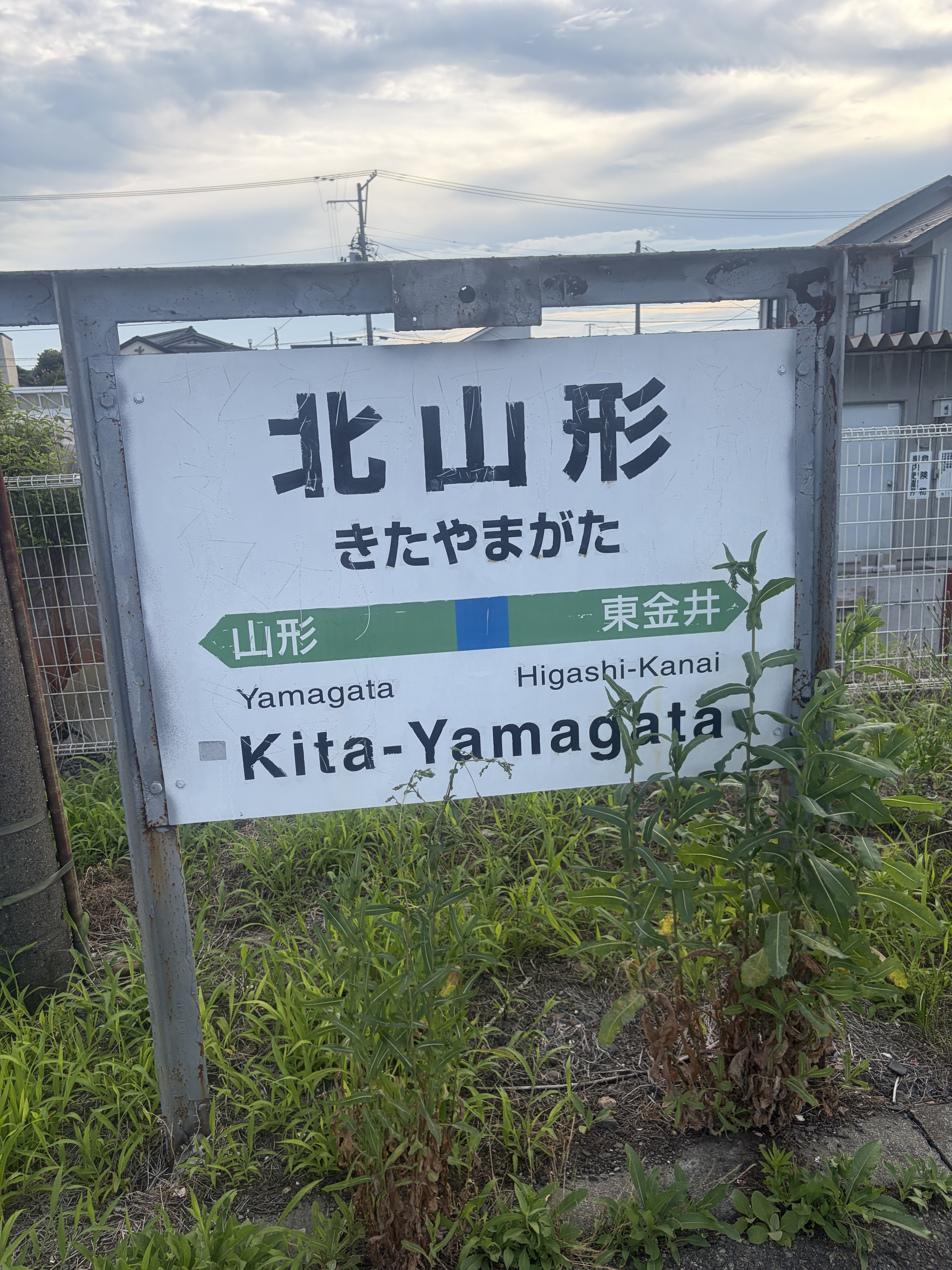

== See also ==
- List of railway stations in Japan
