= Aterazawa Station =

Railway station in Ōe, Yamagata Prefecture, Japan

Aterazawa Station 左沢駅
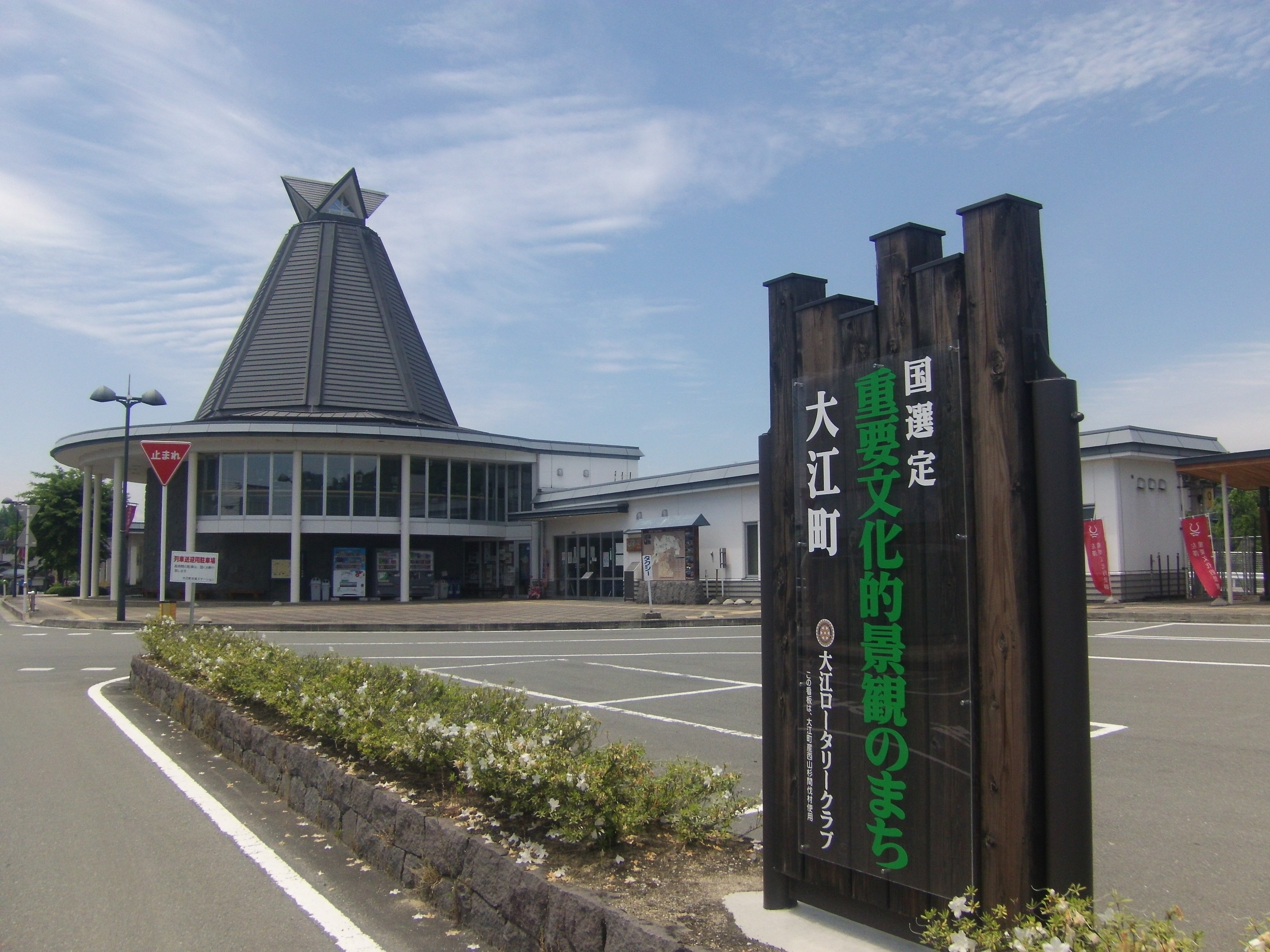
- Aterazawa Station in May 2016

General information
- Location: 876-18 Aterazawa, Ōe-machi, Nishimurayama-gun, Yamagata-ken 990-1101; Japan
- Coordinates: 38°22′55″N 140°12′28″E
- Operator: JR East
- Line: Aterazawa Line
- Distance: 24.3 km (15.1 mi) from Kita-Yamagata
- Platforms: 1 side platform

Other information
- Status: Staffed ticket window (outsourced)
- Website: Official website

History
- Opened: 24 April 1922; 104 years ago

Passengers
- FY2022: 264

Services
Preceding station	JR East	Following station
Terminus	Aterazawa Line	Shibahashi towards Yamagata
Location
- Location within Yamagata Prefecture Location within Japan

Aterazawa Station (左沢駅, Aterazawa-eki) is a railway station located in the town of Ōe, Yamagata Prefecture, Japan, operated by the East Japan Railway Company (JR East). Aterazawa Station is the terminus of the Aterazawa Line.

== Lines ==
Aterazawa Station is served by Aterazawa Line, and is located 24.3 km (15.1 mi) from the start of the line at Kita-Yamagata. The preceding station of Shibahashi is 2 km (1.2 mi) away.

== Station layout ==
The station has a single side platform. The Station is staffed. The station has some accessibility features such as Mobility scooter access and wheelchair-accessible bathroom. The station building contains a town-run shop which selling everything from sweets and miscellaneous goods to local products.

=== Platforms ===
-	■ Aterazawa Line	for Yamagata

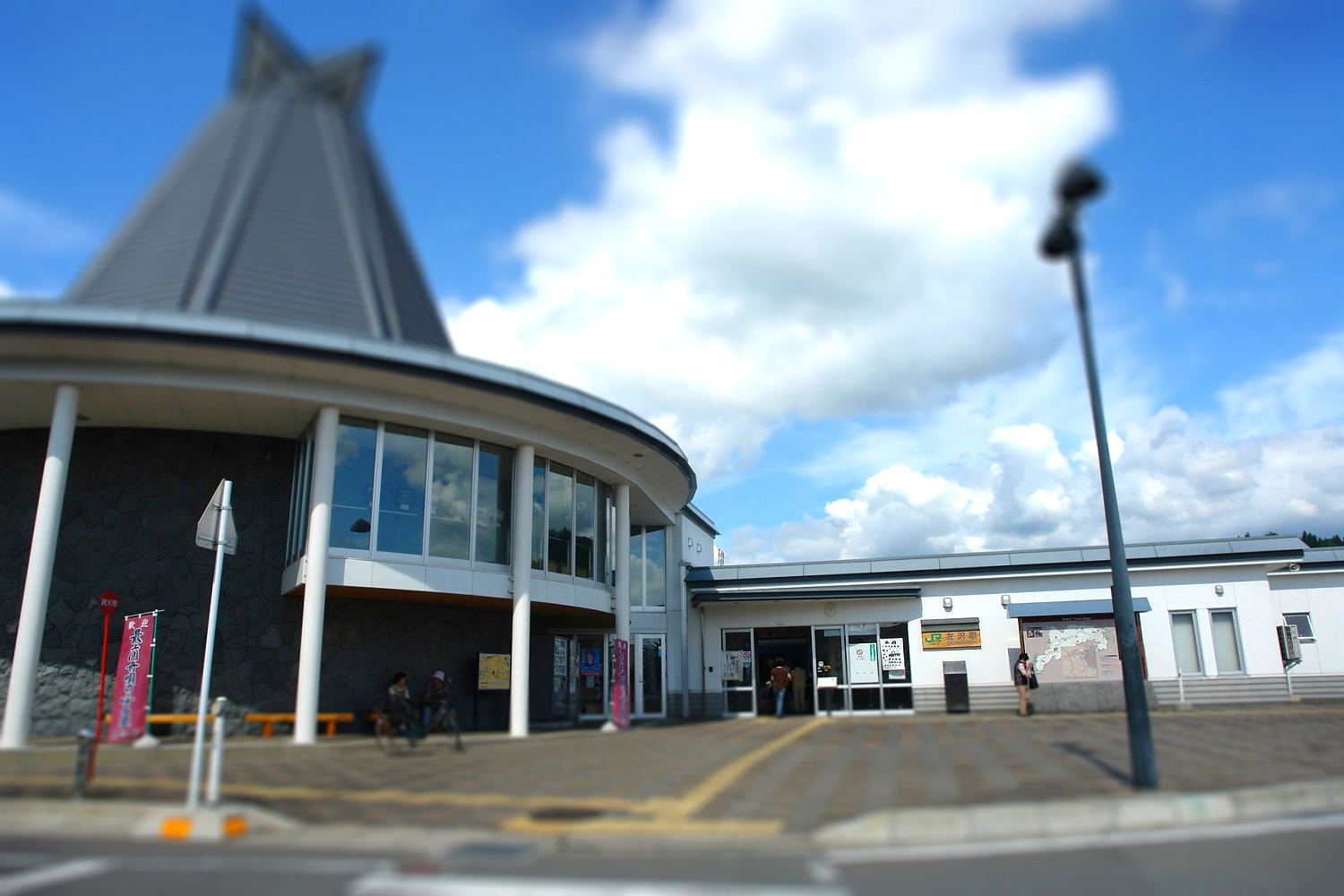
Aterazawa Station front

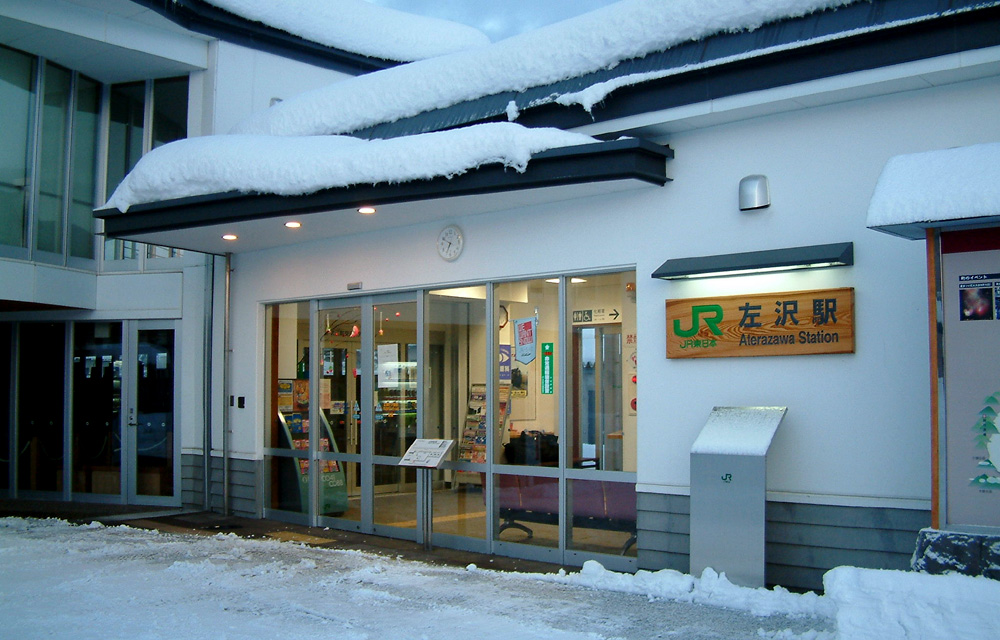
Aterazawa Station Entrance

== History ==
Aterazawa Station began operation on 24 April 1922. With the privatization of the JNR on 1 April 1987, the station came under the control of the East Japan Railway Company.

A new station building was completed in 2002. The Midori no Madoguchi ticket office was closed on 30 November 2021.

== Passenger statistics ==
In fiscal 2022, the station was used by an average of 264 passengers daily (boarding passengers only).

Below is table containing the passenger statistics since the year 2000:

Passenger statistics
Year	Average Daily Boarding Passengers	Year	Average Daily Boarding Passengers	Year	Average Daily Boarding Passengers
2000	487	2010	392	2020	243
2001	402	2011	387	2021	255
2002	456	2012	378	2022	264
2003	463	2013	357		
2004	466	2014	330		
2005	443	2015	311		
2006	421	2016	309		
2007	413	2017	306		
2008	389	2018	311		
2009	396	2019	297		

== Surrounding area ==
- Ōe town hall
- Prefecture Route 9
- Prefecture Route 23
- Prefecture Route 112
- National Route 458
- Mogami River
- Sazawa Onsen
- Yamagata Bank Aterazawa Branch
- Kirayaka Bank Aterazawa Branch
- Ōe Town History and Folklore Museum

== See also ==
- List of railway stations in Japan
