= Yamagata Station =

Railway station in Yamagata, Yamagata Prefecture, Japan

Yamagata Station 山形駅
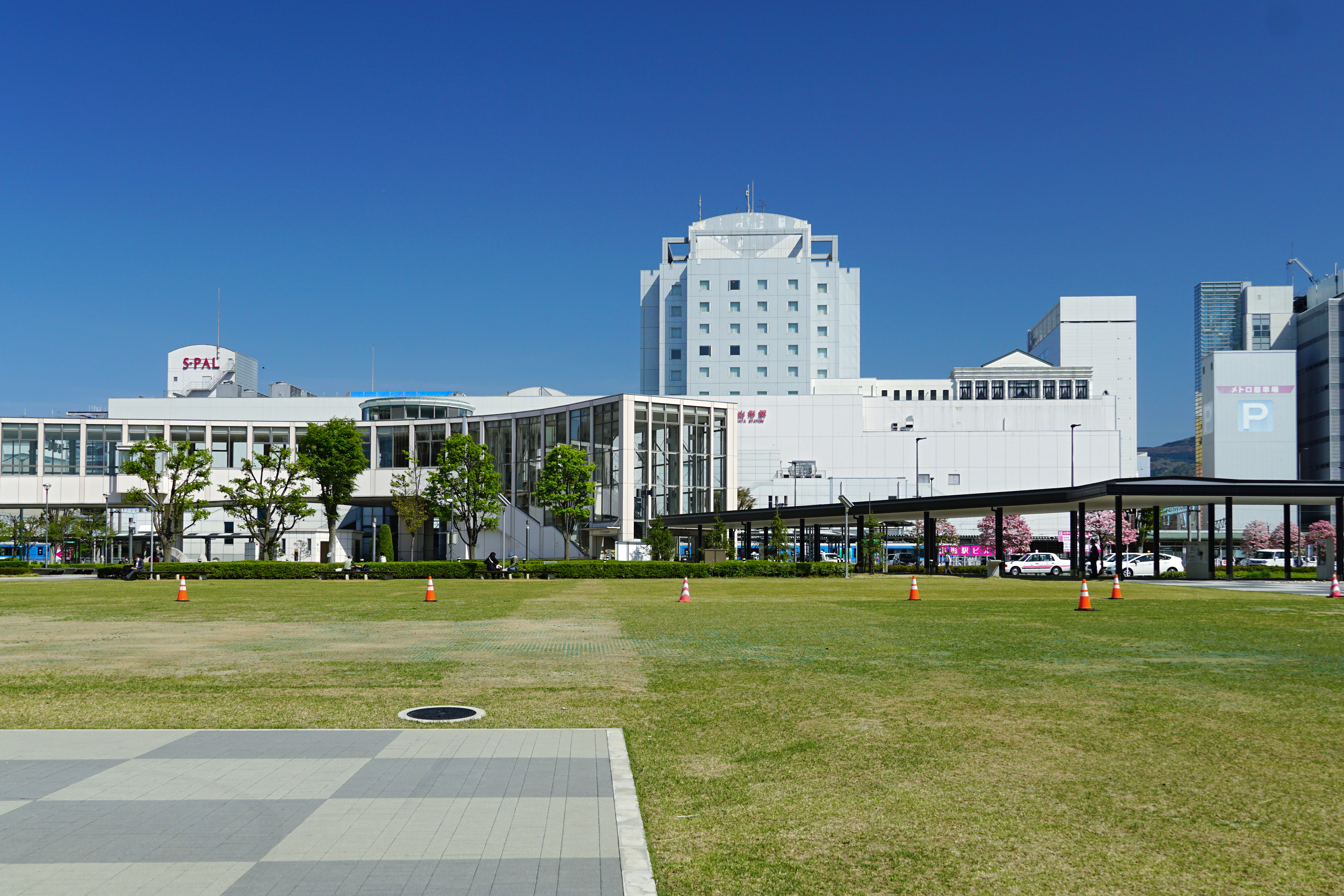
- The west entrance in April 2022

General information
- Location: 1 Kasumi-chō; Yamagata, Yamagata; Japan
- Coordinates: 38°14′55″N 140°19′39″E
- Operator: JR East
- Line: Ōu Main Line
- Platforms: 3 island platforms
- Tracks: 7
- Connections: Bus terminal

Construction
- Structure type: At grade

History
- Opened: 11 April 1901; 125 years ago

Passengers
- FY2012: 10,860 daily

Services
Preceding station	JR East	Following station
Kaminoyama-Onsen towards Tokyo	Yamagata Shinkansen Tsubasa	Tendō towards Shinjō
Zaō towards Fukushima	Yamagata Line	Kita-Yamagata towards Shinjō
Terminus	Senzan Line Rapid A B C Local	Kita-Yamagata towards Sendai
Terminus	Aterazawa Line	Kita-Yamagata towards Aterazawa
Location
- Location within Yamagata Prefecture Location within Japan

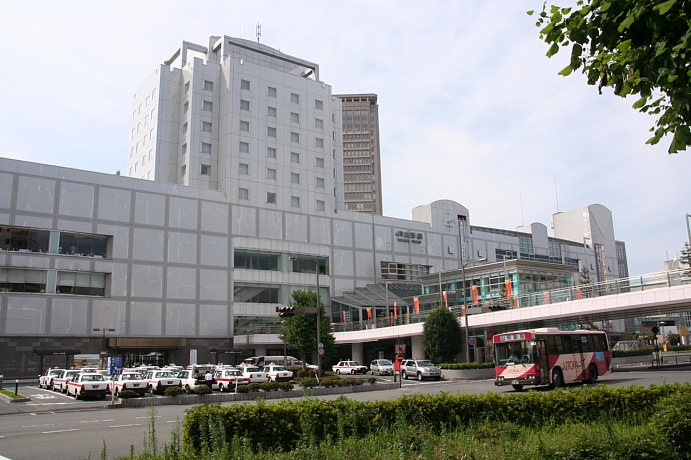
The east entrance in August 2006

Yamagata Station (Japanese: 山形駅, Hepburn: Yamagata-eki) is a railway station in Yamagata, Yamagata Prefecture, Japan, operated by East Japan Railway Company (JR East).

== Station layout ==
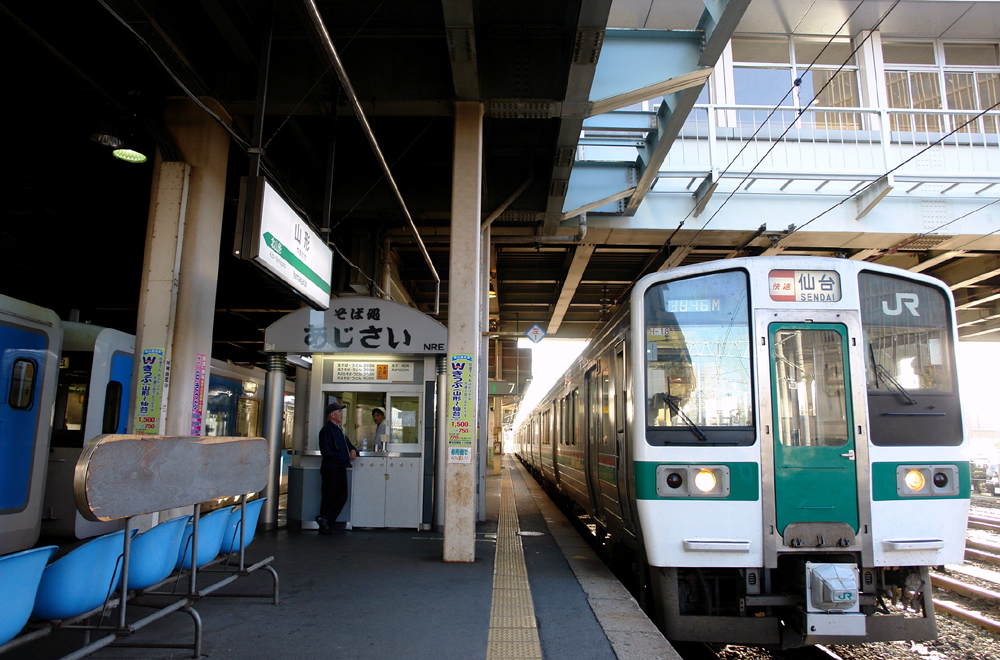
Platforms

The station has a "Midori no Madoguchi" staffed ticket office and a View Plaza travel agency.

=== Platforms ===
1	■ Yamagata Shinkansen	for Fukushima and Tokyo
2	■ Yamagata Shinkansen	for Fukushima and Tokyo for Shinjō
3	■ Yamagata Line	for Shinjō
4	■ Yamagata Line	for Fukushima
5	■ Special platform	for additional trains and services
6	■ Aterazawa Line	for Aterazawa
7	■ Senzan Line	for Sendai

== History ==
Yamagata Station opened on 11 April 1901. With the privatization of JNR on 1 April 1987, the station came under the control of JR East.

Yamagata Shinkansen services started on 1 July 1992. From 4 December 1999, Yamagata Shinkansen services were extended to Shinjō Station.

== Passenger statistics ==
In fiscal 2012, the station was used by an average of 10,860 passengers daily (boarding passengers only). The passenger figures for previous years are as shown below.

Fiscal year	Daily average
2000	11,800
2005	11,096
2010	10,562
2011	10,518
2012	10,860

== Surrounding area ==
- Yamagata City Office
- Yamagata Museum of Art
- Mogami Yoshiaki Historical Museum
- Yamagata Citizens' Hall
- Yamagata Gakuin High School
- Yamagata No. 3 Junior High School
