= List of Japanese films of 2009 =

== Highest-grossing films ==
Rank	Title	Gross
1	Rookies: Graduation	¥8.55 billion
2	Pokémon: Arceus and the Jewel of Life	¥4.67 billion
3	20th Century Boys 3: Redemption	¥4.41 billion
4	Evangelion: 2.0 You Can (Not) Advance	¥4.00 billion
5	Amalfi: Rewards of the Goddess	¥3.65 billion

== List of films ==
A list of films produced in Japan in 2009 (see 2009 in film):

Opening	Title	Director	Cast	Genre	Notes	Ref
31 January	20th Century Boys 2: The Last Hope	Yukihiko Tsutsumi	Toshiaki Karasawa, Etsushi Toyokawa, Takako Tokiwa, Airi Taira	Science fiction, Mystery	Based on a manga	
29 August	20th Century Boys 3: Redemption	Yukihiko Tsutsumi	Toshiaki Karasawa, Etsushi Toyokawa, Takako Tokiwa, Airi Taira	Science fiction, Mystery	Based on a manga	
14 May	Air Doll	Hirokazu Koreeda	Bae Doona, Arata, Itsuji Itao	Drama	Competed at the 2009 Cannes Film Festival	
18 July	Amalfi: Rewards of the Goddess	Hiroshi Nishitani	Yūji Oda, Yūki Amami, Erika Toda	Mystery		
9 May	April Bride	Ryuichi Hiroki	Nana Eikura, Eita	Drama		
18 July	Arceus Chōkoku no Jikū e	Kunihiko Yuyama	Rica Matsumoto, Megumi Toyoguchi, Yūji Ueda	Anime		
7 February	Asahiyama Zoo Story- Penguins in the Sky	Masahiko Makino	Nishida Toshiyuki, Nakamura Osamu Sun, Maeda Megumi, Takashi Sasano, etc.	Drama	Based on real events	
14 March	Beauty	Toshio Gotō	Takataro Kataoka, Ainosuke Kataoka, Kumiko Asō	Drama	Entered into the 31st Moscow International Film Festival	
1 May	Cho Kamen Rider Den-O & Decade Neo Generations: The Onigashima Warship	Osamu Kaneda	Dori Sakurada, Takuya Mizoguchi, Ruka Sawaki	Tokusatsu		
11 April	Crows Zero 2	Takashi Miike	Shun Oguri, Shunsuke Daitō, Suzunosuke Tanaka	Action		
24 January	Engine Sentai Go-onger vs. Gekiranger	Satoshi Morota	Yasuhisa Furuhara, Shinwa Kataoka, Rina Aizawa, Masahiro Usui, Kenji Ebisawa, Akiko Nakagawa, Hidenori Tokuyama, Yumi Sugimoto, Nao Oikawa, Hiroki Suzuki, Mina Fukui, Manpei Takagi, Riki Miura, Sotaro, Hirofumi Araki, Yuka Hirata, Naoki Kawano, Kazue Itoh	Tokusatsu		
27 June	Evangelion: 2.0 You Can (Not) Advance	Hideaki Anno	Megumi Ogata, Megumi Hayashibara, Yuko Miyamura	Anime		
1 May	Goemon	Kazuaki Kiriya	Yōsuke Eguchi, Takao Osawa, Ryōko Hirosue	Action		
11 July	Gokusen: The Movie	Tōya Satō	Yukie Nakama, Kazuya Kamenashi, Katsuhisa Namase, Yuya Takaki, Yuta Tamamori, Shun Oguri	Drama		
8 May	Hotel Chelsea	Jorge Valdés-Iga	Nao Nagasawa, Justin Morck, Hiro Masuda, Sawa Suzuki, Anthony Laurent	Thriller		
24 October	I Give My First Love to You	Takehiko Shinjo	Mitsuru Komiyama, Mika Nakamura, Hiroyasu Murakami, Fumihiro Hirai, Fumihiro Hirai	Drama	Based on a manga	
10 October	Kaiji	Tōya Satō	Tatsuya Fujiwara, Yūki Amami	Drama	Based on a manga	
8 August	Kamen Rider Decade The Movie: All Riders vs. Great Shocker	Osamu Kaneda	Masahiro Inoue, Ryouta Murai, Kanna Mori	Tokusatsu		
12 December	Kamen Rider × Kamen Rider W & Decade: Movie War 2010	Ryuta Tasaki	Renn Kiriyama, Masaki Suda, Hikaru Yamamoto	Tokusatsu		
19 September	Kamui Gaiden	Yōichi Sai	Ken'ichi Maysuyama, Koyuki	Action		
10 October	Kuhio taisa	Daihachi Yoshida	Masato Sakai, Sakura Ando	Drama		
12 December	Mega Monster Battle: Ultra Galaxy Legend The Movie	Koichi Sakamoto	Susumu Kurobe, Kohji Moritsugu, Shunji Igarashi	Tokusatsu		
20 June	Mt. Tsurugidake	Daisaku Kimura	Tadanobu Asano, Teruyuki Kagawa, Aoi Miyazaki	Drama		
1 August	Naruto Shippūden 3: Inheritors of the Will of Fire	Masahiko Murata	Junko Takeuchi, Kazuhiko Inoue, Satoshi Hino	Anime		
17 January	Pride	Shusuke Kaneko	Stephanie	Drama	Based on a manga	
10 April	Saikin-rettou	Kenji Murakami	Naoto Takenaka	Comedy		
15 June	Samurai Princess	Kengo Kaji	Aino Kishi, Dai Mizuno	Gore film		
8 August	Samurai Sentai Shinkenger The Movie: The Fateful War	Shōjirō Nakazawa	Tori Matsuzaka, Hiroki Aiba, Rin Takanashi	Tokusatsu		
	Soul Red					
17 October	The Shock Labyrinth 3D	Takashi Shimizu	Yūya Yagira, Misako Renbutsu, Ryo Katsuji	Horror		
12 December	Snow Prince	Joji Matsuoka	Shintaro Morimoto, Tadanobu Asano, Teruyuki Kagawa, Rei Dan, Katsuo Nakamura, Maiko, Gaku Yamamoto, Keiko Kishi	Drama	Based on a Classic Story	
25 April	Tengen Toppa Gurren Lagann the Movie: Spiral Stone Chapter	Hiroyuki Imaishi		Anime		
7 November	Tenshi no Koi	Yuri Kanchiku	Nozomi Sasaki; Shosuke Tanihara	Romance	Based on a cell phone novel	
26 June	Vampire Girl vs. Frankenstein Girl	Yoshihiro Nishimura, Naoyuki Tomomatsu	Yukie Kawamura, Eri Otoguro	Horror	Based on a manga	
7 March	Yatterman	Takashi Miike	Sho Sakurai, Saki Fukuda, Kyoko Fukada	Action		
23 December	Yona Yona Penguin	Rintaro		Anime		
10 January	Zen	Banmei Takahashi	Kankuro Nakamura, Yuki Uchida	Historical		
