= Itazu Kuma =

- Film poster
- イタズ 熊
- Directed by: Toshio Gotō
- Screenplay by: Ryūnosuke Ono
- Story by: Toshio Gotō
- Produced by: Kazuyuki Kuwayama; Hisashi Yabe
- Starring: Takahiro Tamura; Junko Sakurada; Hiroshi Miyata; Ryutaro Tatsumi; Nijiko Kiyokawa
- Cinematography: Takaya Yamazaki
- Edited by: Jun Nabeshima
- Music by: Masaru Sato
- Production companies: Kobushi Productions; Toei Company; Nippon TV Network; Dentsu
- Distributed by: Toei Company
- Release date: September 5, 1987 (Japan)
- Running time: 117 minutes
- Country: Japan
- Language: Japanese

Itazu Kuma (Japanese: イタズ 熊), also known as Born Wild, Run Free and The Forest of the Little Bear, is a 1987 Japanese drama film directed by Toshio Gotō. Set at the end of the Taishō era, the film depicts the story of a hunter who raises a bear cub after killing its mother. As the cub grows, it comes into conflict with the hunter's village. The film stars Takahiro Tamura as Ginzō the hunter, in addition to Junko Sakurada, Hiroshi Miyata, Ryutaro Tatsumi and Nijiko Kiyokawa. Itazu Kuma was theatrically released by Toei Company on September 5, 1987, in Japan. It was acclaimed and nominated for several awards, winning the Kinema Junpo Best Supporting Actress award for Junko Sakurada's performance. Itazu Kuma was also shown at the 15th Moscow International Film Festival. The film's score was composed by Masaru Sato, while its theme song "Itazu" was performed by Iruka. Itazu is the word for bear in the Ani branch of the Matagi dialect.

== Plot ==
In the last days of Taishō era Akita, Ginzō (nicknamed "One Shot Ginzō" for his perfect marksmanship), an alcoholic Matagi with a fierce temper, gets into a fight and is imprisoned. After getting out of jail, he returns to his home in Ani Village (where his daughter-in-law Kimi and grandson Ippei live) for the first time in 10 years. The forests surrounding Ani are suffering from deforestation and habitat destruction as trees are felled to supply timbers for Ani Mine. A starving female brown bear that the villagers call "Katamimi" (One Ear) has acquired a taste for human flesh and recently attacked the village. The village chief has offered a reward of 20 yen for killing the bear, but the few remaining Matagi have not succeeded so far. Ginzō decides to hunt One Ear.

On the third day of his pursuit, Ginzō finds One Ear in the valley and kills it with his Murata rifle. However, that night, Ginzō finds One Ear's cub in his house. Under Matagi tradition, it is forbidden to kill a mother bear with a cub. Guilt-stricken, Ginzō gives away his gun, quits the Matagi lifestyle and decides to raise the cub, which he names "Gonta". He hopes to redeem himself in the process. After introducing it to his family, Ippei quickly becomes attached to Gonta and takes good care of him. Ippei teaches tricks to the mischievous Gonta, and they go on many adventures together.

A year later, Gonta is growing rapidly. Ippei spends a large amount of time with him, but Gonta's mischief escalates. He begins to ravage the village's fields and chicken coops. This causes an uproar among the villagers. Ginzō, feeling that the cub has become too much for his family to handle, decides to return Gonta to nature. Ippei is sad to say goodbye to the bear. Ginzō and Ippei blindfold Gonta, put him in a cage, take him to the depths of the mountains and release him.

Another year passes. When the mine's chief engineers go hunting in the mountains, a giant bear suddenly appears. It is Gonta all grown up. As he is unafraid of humans, Gonta approaches them. The engineers respond by shooting at him. Gonta is wounded in the head but survives. Later, in winter, Gonta appears in the village, attacking and killing several villagers in a rampage. Meanwhile, Ginzō gets into another fight and is put into the local jail. However, he is released on the condition that he "finish off the giant bear". The next morning, Ginzō enters the snowy mountains. Ginzō, knowing that the target is Gonta, feels conflicted. He finds Gonta; the bear, recognizing Ginzō, performs a trick from when it was a cub. Ginzō shoots and kills Gonta, crying while doing so. However, the gunshots trigger an avalanche, and Ginzō perishes too. The film ends with Kimi and Ippei standing in front of Ginzō's grave.

== Cast ==
- Takahiro Tamura as Ginzō Iwata
- Junko Sakurada as Kimi Iwata
- Hiroshi Miyata as Ippei Iwata
- Ryutaro Tatsumi as Takahara
- Nijiko Kiyokawa as Gen Nomura, Grandmother
- Tōru Yuri as Heisaku
- Sanji Kojima as Hashimoto
- Kōjirō Kusanagi as Yamamoto, Landlord
- Bsaku Satoh as Tashiro
- Hiroshi Hasegawa as Sano
- Ben Hiura as Obayashi
- Tōru Yuri as Heisaku Ochi
- Takashi Ebata as Miner A
- Hirohisa Nakata as Miner B
- Masahiro Yoshihara as Bodyguard A
- Yoshinori Nagasawa as Bodyguard B
- Takao Yaguchi as Police Chief
- Hori Nagako as Tea House Landlady
- Gōzō Sōma as Sled Rider
- Ryutaro Tatsumi

== Background ==
Itazu is the word for bear in the Ani branch of the Matagi dialect, which stems from the dialect of the Tōhoku region. In Tōhoku and amongst the Matagi subculture, bears were historically revered as "gifts from god". Director Toshio Gotō had previously made a film about the Matagi subculture, known as Matagi or The Old Bear Hunter (1982), to which Itazu Kuma is a spiritual successor.

== Production ==
Filming lasted from the spring of 1985 to April 1987 in order to depict Gonta and Ippei's growth. The film was shot on location in Akita Prefecture, including Ani, Akita City, Kosaka and the area around Mt. Kitanomata. Local town officials, townspeople and children participated as extras in filming, and also aided the production in procuring resources in the rural region.

Hiroshi Miyata was cast as Ippei after an audition process involving 1,500 children.

The six bear cubs used for production were selected from 160 bears at Noboribetsu Bear Park. Each cub was used to represent a separate stage of development. A scene of Gonta playing in nature was composed of documentary footage that the assistant directors came across. The village bear attack sequence was achieved with a combination of animal stuntwork with an adult bear and special effects.

== Soundtrack ==
Masaru Sato composed the score for Itazu Kuma. The film's theme song is "Itazu", which was written and performed by Japanese folk singer Iruka. It was released on her album My Animal in 1987 by Panam.

== Release ==
Itazu Kuma was screened at the 15th Moscow International Film Festival in July 1987. It also played at the 11th Montreal World Film Festival on August 27, 1987. It was theatrically released by Toei Company on September 5, 1987, in Japan. The film was later released on VHS and LaserDisc (including an American LaserDisc that featured Cantonese and Japanese audio options with hardcoded English subtitles), though it was never released to DVD or Blu-ray. The film is currently available to stream via Toei On Demand, and it was shown in HD on the cable channel Nihon Eiga Senmon (BS255, BS Nippon Eiga) on March 29, 2026.

== Reception ==
The film was part of a wave of Japanese animal films released in the wake of the box office hit Antarctica (1983). Despite being part of a trend, Itazu Kuma was well received by critics. Japanese critic Rinpei Kito wrote, "Because it is a work that deals with animals and nature, it is often thought of as a documentary, but the script of Ryūnosuke Ono, who continued to write entertainment works for Toei, is entertainment with rich drama and the charm of program pictures. It is... a well-organized movie."

In an English-language review, David Stratton said the film was, "An outstanding family pic" and that "It should please kids and their parents worldwide." He also stated that the, "Human characters aren't ignored, and all ring true," concluding, "Few who see the film won't be delighted with it."

== Awards and nominations ==
Minister of Education's Art Encouragement Prize

- Won

62nd Kinema Junpo Best Ten Awards

- Won: Best Supporting Actress (Junko Sakurada)

42nd Mainichi Film Awards

- Won: Excellence Film (shared with Eiga Joyū, Tora-san Goes North and The Emperor's Naked Army Marches On)

12th Hochi Film Awards

- Won: Best Supporting Actress (Junko Sakurada)

11th Japan Academy Awards

- Nominated: Outstanding Performance by an Actress in a Supporting Role (Junko Sakurada)
- Nominated: Outstanding Achievement in Film Editing (Jun Nabeshima, also nominated for Jiro monogatari and River of Fireflies)
- Nominated: Outstanding Achievement in Music (Masaru Sato, also nominated for Tokyo Bordello and Guys Who Never Learn)
- Nominated: Outstanding Achievement in Sound Recording (Tsutomu Honda)
