= Banji Banzaburō =

Legendary Japanese hunter

- 万二 万三郎
- Born: Shimotsuke Province, Japan
- Died: Dewa Province, Japan
- Era: Heian period (794-1185)

Banji Banzaburō (Japanese: 万二 万三郎; fl. 858–876) was, according to legend, a Japanese hunter and the first matagi.

== Summary ==
Manuscripts mentioning Banji Banzaburō were usually hand-copied by Buddhist priests because they were often the only literate people in the remote villages of the Japanese countryside at the time. Over the centuries this resulted in multiple versions of the story being handed down in different locations, with depictions of Banji sometimes colored by the traditional Buddhist moral opposition to hunting.

== Banji Banzaburō ==
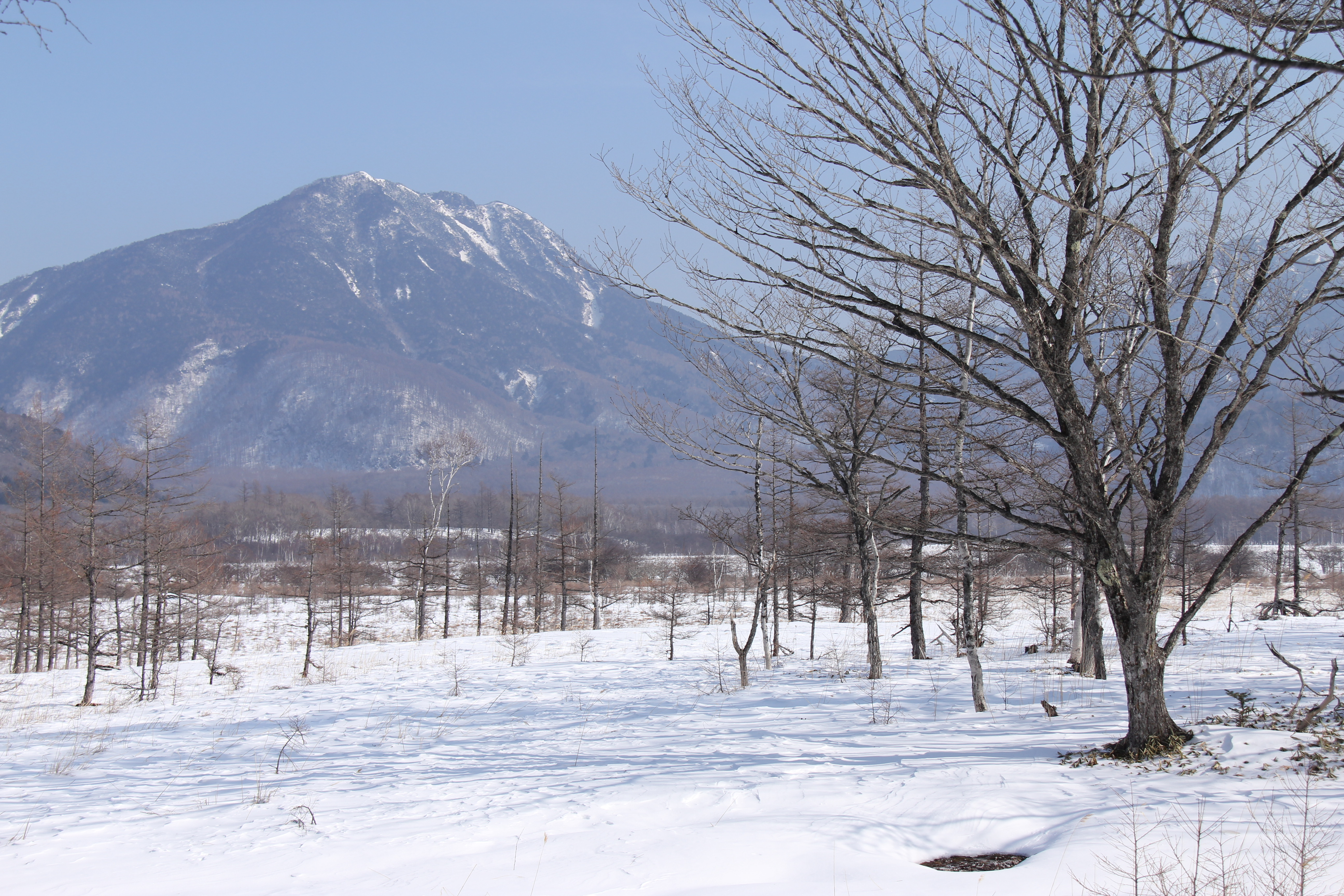
Mt. Nikkō in 2011

The story of Banji Banzaburō is primarily known from the Yamadachi konpon no maki (山達根本之巻), a scroll written in 1193 (Kenkyū 4, Kōki 1853) and preserved in Ani village.

During the reign of Emperor Seiwa (858–876), the gongen of Mt. Nikkō in Shimotsuke Province was clashing fiercely with the incarnate spirit of Mt. Akagi which had taken the shape of a monstrous giant snake or centipede. Losing the battle, the gongen of Mt. Nikkō disguised itself as a white stag and fled, seeking the aid of a master of archery named Banji Banzaburō who lived at the base of the mountain. Taking up his bow, Banji struck down the spirit of Mt. Akagi with only two arrows.

In gratitude, the gongen of Mt. Nikkō gave Banji a yamadachi license (山達御免, yamadachi gomen), authorizing him to "hunt beasts on any mountain in Japan".

Thereafter, Banji moved north to Dewa Province, where he found plentiful animals to hunt. He finally settled in the vicinity of what is today Ani village. Because of this, the Ani matagi (阿仁マタギ), especially those from the nearby villages of Uttō (打当), Hitachinai (比立内), and Nekko (根子), were said to be direct descendants of Banji.

== Banji and Banzaburō ==
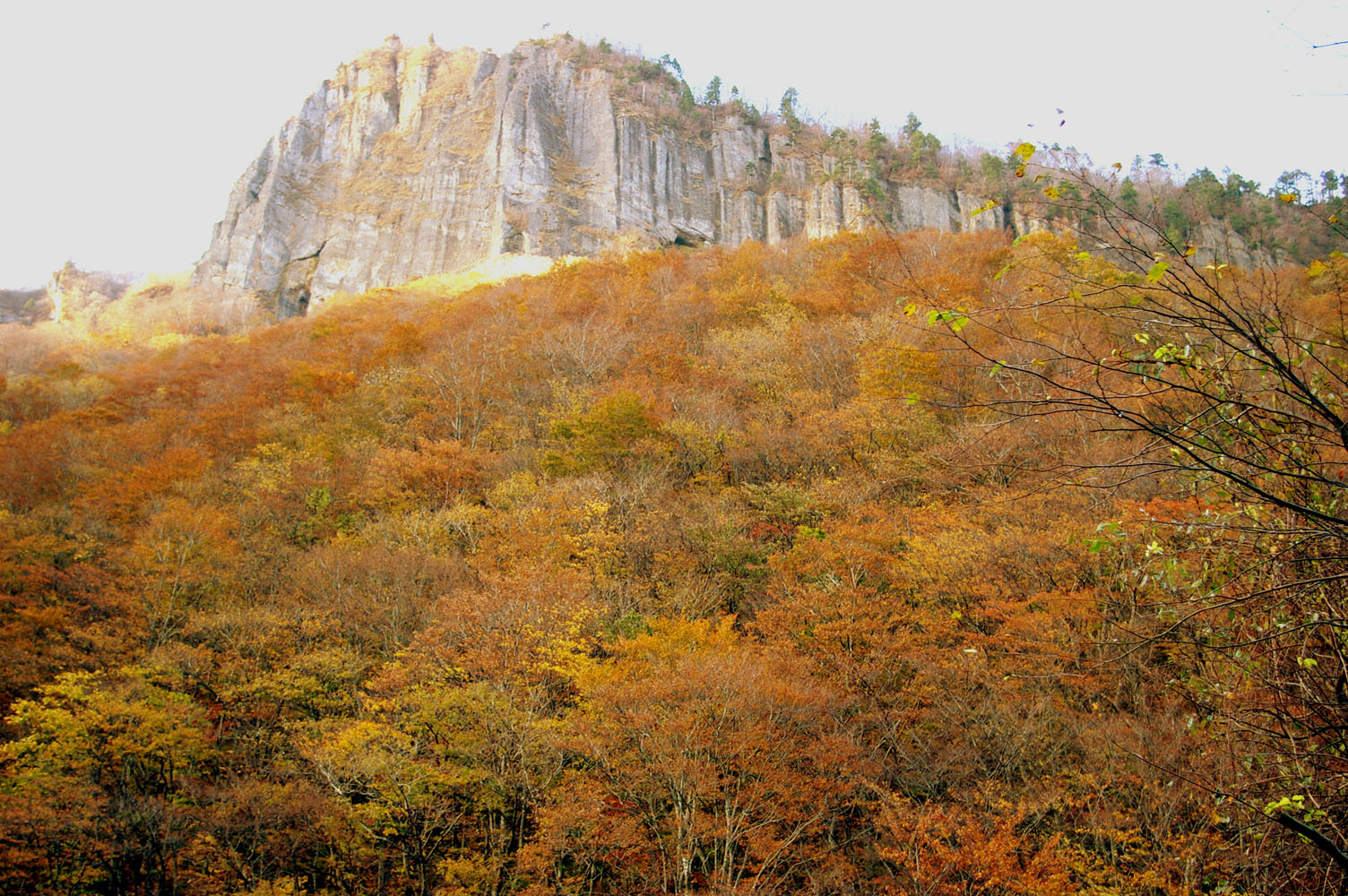
The Banji-iwa in 2007

Another manuscript with a similar title, Yamadachi kongen no maki (山立根元之巻), splits the character of Banji Banzaburō into the elder Banji (磐司; lit. 'ruler of the mountain crags') and the younger Banzaburō (万三郎) — two brothers who lived on the Banji-iwa (磐司岩; Banji's Rock) overlooking Futakuchi Canyon in Mutsu Province. One night, a heavily pregnant woman appeared at the door of Banji's cabin. Banji took her in cared for her. She said that she had asked for shelter at Banzaburō's cabin, but he had harshly turned her away in accordance with the ancient code of the matagi, which considered childbirth unclean. Banji respected Banzaburō's dedication to the code, but felt that he had also done the right thing in showing kindness.

The next morning, the woman safely delivered her baby. In thanks, she taught Banji a hunter's prayer — to say "Banji" three times when entering the mountains for a good catch of game. Then the woman revealed that she was a spirit of the mountains (山の神, yama no kami) and disappeared. Thereafter, Banji always had more success on his hunts than did Banzaburō.

Some versions of this story have the mysterious woman received by Banji Banzaburō himself. Banji, who is said to have ruled the land around the Banji-iwa as either the lord of a manorial estate or as a forest ranger (山守り, yamamori), is said to have cooperated with Ennin to found the Risshaku-ji.

Yanagita Kunio suggested that the name "Banji" was actually a corruption of banjin (磐神, spirit of the mountain crags).

== See also ==
- Fujiwara no Hidesato, credited in the Tawara Tōda Monogatari with slaying a giant centipede
