= Tateyama Station =

Tateyama Station may refer to:

- Tateyama Station (Chiba) - (館山駅) in Chiba Prefecture
- Tateyama Station (Toyama) - (立山駅) in Toyama Prefecture
- Tateyama Station (Yamagata) - (楯山駅) in Yamagata Prefecture
