= Matagi (film) =

- DVD cover
- Directed by: Toshio Gotō
- Screenplay by: Atsushi Yamatoya; Toshio Gotō
- Story by: Toshio Gotō
- Produced by: Tsutomu Sakurai
- Starring: Kō Nishimura; Yoshito Anpo; Yoshio Inaba; Goichi Yamada; Yue Hayashi
- Cinematography: Takaya Yamazaki
- Edited by: Jun Nabeshima
- Music by: Kentarō Haneda
- Production company: SEIDO Productions
- Distributed by: SEIDO Productions; Daiei Film
- Release date: January 25, 1982 (Japan)
- Running time: 103 minutes
- Country: Japan
- Language: Japanese

Matagi (Japanese: マタギ), known in English as The Old Bear Hunter, is a 1982 Japanese docufiction drama film directed by Toshio Gotō and co-written by Gotō with Atsushi Yamatoya. It was Gotō's second film as a director, following Komugīro no tenshi suzume to shōnen. The film depicts the story of a Matagi who sets out to hunt the giant bear that scarred him years earlier. It stars Kō Nishimura in the lead role, in addition to Yoshito Anpo, Yoshio Inaba, Goichi Yamada and Yue Hayashi. The score was composed by Kentarō Haneda. Matagi was theatrically released by SEIDO Productions and Daiei Film on January 25, 1982, in Japan. The film was shown at the 32nd Berlin International Film Festival, where it was an honorable mention for the UNICEF Award. Gotō would later direct a spiritual successor to Matagi, known as Itazu Kuma (1987).

== Plot ==
A mixture of documentary and fiction, the film tells the story of Heizo Sekiguchi, a 63 year old Matagi, one of the last of his kind. For years, Heizo has hunted bears according to the ancient Matagi customs, accompanied by Shiro, his Akita dog. He is a master of his craft who only takes one bullet for his Murata rifle on each expedition. He hunts in the Shirakami-Sanchi mountains, a territory that straddles more than 600 square miles of Aomori and Akita prefectures.

Years prior to the film's beginning, Heizo was attacked by a gigantic 9-foot-tall Japanese black bear. He escaped with his life, but the bear's claws permanently scarred his face. He has vowed to hunt down the animal ever since, though few believe his tale of such a large bear, including his own son Iwakichi. Iwakichi believes that the days of earning a living solely from Matagi work are over, and he is mostly away from home, seeking income outside of farming. As a result, Heizo's grandson Taro is left in his grandfather's care much of the time. Taro does not believe his grandfather's story either, but he is proud of him nonetheless. He dreams of becoming a bear hunter himself someday.

One day, Shiro gives birth to five puppies. Taro receives the runt of the litter, Chibi. He intends to raise Chibi into a bear hunting dog. Soon Heizo discovers that Shiro is terminally ill. Shiro dies shortly after. Heizo, who in his old age suffers from eyesight issues, cannot go into the mountains without a guide dog. Upon seeing Chibi bare his fangs at a bear skin, Heizo gets the idea to train him as his new guide dog. The traditional training methods are brutal: Heizo slashes at Chibi with bear claws, force feeds him bear meat smeared with fat, and even dons a bear hide before attacking the dog. He later enters Chibi into a dog-training competition in which several Akita are forced to attack a chained bear. Taro cries at the brutality of the training, but Chibi endures it well.

As autumn deepens, bear hunting season comes once again. Bear attacks begin to occur near the village, culminating in a young girl being attacked. Heizo, begged by the victim's mother to kill the bear, sniffs out its scent. He believes it is the same bear that once scarred him. Heizo takes only a ceremonial spear and Chibi with him, tracking the animal to the mountains. Chibi is agitated, and soon Heizo discovers that Taro has followed them. Heizo tells Taro to go back as it is a dangerous hunt, but Taro does not listen. After scolding him repeatedly with no progress, Heizo lets Taro tag along.

Storm clouds arrive. The storm continues for days. When it subsides, their target finally appears through the fog. It is the same bear that fought Heizo years earlier. Heizo challenges it to a one-on-one battle, but he cannot land the killing blow. Chibi lunges at the bear, but it slashes Chibi with its claws. The dog is thrown into the air and dies instantly. Chibi's distraction gives Heizo enough time to gore the bear with his spear. The bear dies, and afterwards, Taro buries Chibi. Though he is hurt by the death of his dog, he looks in awe at his grandfather, having gained even more respect for the man.

== Cast ==
- Kō Nishimura as Heizo Sekiguchi
- Yoshito Anpo as Taro
- Yoshio Inaba as Kokichi Suzuki
- Goichi Yamada as Iwakichi, father
- Yue Hayashi as Yoriko, older sister
- Ichirō Izawa as Kakuji Yoshimura
- Shoichi Kuwayama as Professor Igarashi
- Toshitaka Ito as Shigeharu Kida
- Hiroshi Yoriyama as Yohachi Takahashi
- Michiko Hoshi as Tome Yoshimura
- Junzaburō Ban as Police officer
- Kazuki Tomokawa as Forestry officer
- Akio Yokoyama as Tournament registration
- Takao Yaguchi as Judge
- Akio Satake as Fur shop owner
- Yasuo Kanechika as Bus driver
- Mihoko Fujita as Female veterinarian
- Eiko Hori as Daughter's mother
- Kyoko Saito as Hisago landlady

== Background ==
Matagi were a traditional subculture of bear hunters in the Tōhoku region of northern Japan. Their history dates back to the Heian period. Medieval Matagi would hunt in groups, though beginning with the introduction of modern firearms in the 19th century, this practice diminished over time. Matagi had their own spiritual practices, intricate rituals and dialect. They were careful not to waste any part of an animal or kill more than they needed, and they believed that bears were "blessings from the Mountain God." In recent decades, their numbers have significantly dwindled. There are multiple theories as to the origins of the word "Matagi", with some believing it is derived from the Tōhoku dialect, while others think it originates from the Ainu language.

== Production ==
The film was shot in VistaVision, with on location shooting taking place in Akita Prefecture, including the town of Ani. Real documentary footage of bear skinning and Akita dog training was used in the production, including the competition with the chained bear.

== Release ==
Matagi was screened at the 32nd Berlin International Film Festival, where it received an honorable mention for the UNICEF Award. It was theatrically released by SEIDO Productions and Daiei Film on January 25, 1982, in Japan.

In 2008, the film was screened at the 21st Tokyo International Film Festival in the "natural TIFF" section, a special category created to tie in with the festival's overall ecological theme that year. The film has also been screened in Los Angeles and New Delhi, with the latter facilitated by the Japan Foundation.

The film was later released to DVD on March 22, 2014. It was shown in HD on the cable channel Nihon Eiga Senmon (BS255, BS Nippon Eiga) on March 29, 2026.

== Awards and nominations ==
Minister of Education's Art Encouragement Prize for New Artists

- Won

56th Kinema Junpo Best Ten Awards

- Annual Top Films: 11th place

37th Mainichi Film Awards

- Won: Best Actor (Kō Nishimura)

32nd Berlin International Film Festival

- UNICEF Award: Honorable mention
