= Minami-Dewa Station =

Railway station in Yamagata, Yamagata Prefecture, Japan

Minami-Dewa Station 南出羽駅
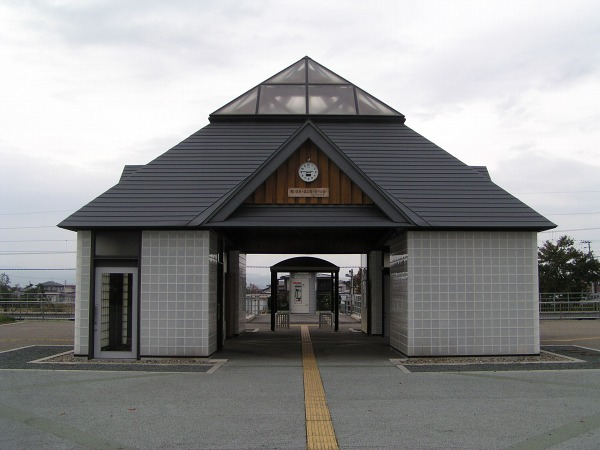
- Minami-Dewa Station in October 2005

General information
- Location: Nanaura, Yamagata-shi, Yamagata-ken 990-2171; Japan
- Coordinates: 38°18′10″N 140°20′41″E
- Operator: JR East
- Line: ■ Ōu Main Line
- Distance: 93.6 km from Fukushima
- Platforms: 2 side platforms

Other information
- Status: Unstaffed

History
- Opened: March 5, 1952

Services
Preceding station	JR East	Following station
Uzen-Chitose towards Fukushima	Yamagata Line	Urushiyama towards Shinjō
Route map
Location
- Location within Yamagata Prefecture Location within Japan

Minami-Dewa Station (南出羽駅, Minami-Dewa-eki) is a railway station in the city of Yamagata, Yamagata Prefecture, Japan, operated by East Japan Railway Company (JR East).

== Lines ==
Minami-Dewa Station is served by the Ōu Main Line, and is located 93.6 rail kilometers from the terminus of the line at Fukushima Station.

== Station layout ==
The station has one side platform serving a single bi-directional track. The station is unattended.

== History ==
Minami-Dewa Station opened on March 5, 1952. The station was absorbed into the JR East network upon the privatization of JNR on April 1, 1987. A new station building was completed in 2000.

== Surrounding area ==
- Yamagata Prefectural Central Hospital
- Yamagata Prefectural University of Health Sciences

== See also ==
- List of railway stations in Japan
