= Pete on the Way to Heaven =

2009 film

- Directed by: Nikolai Dostal
- Written by: Mikhail Kurayev
- Produced by: Fyodor Popov
- Starring: Egor Pavlov
- Cinematography: Alisher Khamidkhodjaev
- Release date: 22 June 2009
- Running time: 97 minutes
- Country: Russia
- Language: Russian

Pete on the Way to Heaven (Russian: Петя по дороге в Царствие Небесное, translit. Petia po doroge v tsarstvie nebesnoye) is a 2009 Russian drama film directed by Nikolai Dostal. It won the Golden George at the 31st Moscow International Film Festival.

== Cast ==
- Egor Pavlov as Peter Makarov
- Aleksandr Korshunov as Konovalov
- Roman Madyanov as Colonel Boguslavsky
- Svetlana Timofeeva-Letunovskaya as Colonel's wife
- Evgeniy Redko as Surgeon Yoffe
- Svetlana Ulybina as Peter's mother
- Nikolay Machulskiy as Captain Yarkin
