= Sanka (ethnic group) =

Nomadic group in Japan

The Sanka (サンカ) were a population of nomadic mountain people who are believed to have once existed in Japan.

== Summary ==
The Sanka had no permanent settlements, but lived in bands of wandering hunter-gatherers. They were known to sometimes visit villages to trade. It is unknown when and where the Sanka originated. Kita Sadakichi suggested that they were the descendants of farmers or outcastes who fled into the mountains during long period of civil war in the 15th and 16th centuries. Until the Meiji period, the term sanka (さんか) was used by Japanese police in reference to itinerant or unemployed people regarded as likely to become criminals.

Early research on the Sanka was conducted by Yanagita Kunio in the 1910s. Around the same time, Takano Yasaburō (鷹野 彌三郎) described the Sanka as being entirely criminal in character and a threat to national security. Yanagita criticized Takano's theory, saying that the proclivity for thievery associated with the Sanka came from "a difference in [their] conception of property".

== See also ==
- Burakumin
- Cave dweller
- Tsuchigumo, ancient tribes who fought against the early Japanese state
- Matagi
- Eta
- Ebune
- Kumosuke

== Bibliography ==
- 後藤 Gotō, 興善 Kōzen (1989). 又鬼と山窩 Matagi and Sanka. Japan: 批評社 Hihyōsha. ISBN 4826502893.
