= Yamagata Hanagasa Festival =

Tōhoku Japanese festival

The Yamagata Hanagasa Festival (山形花笠まつり, Yamagata Hanagasa matsuri) is one of the four major Japanese festivals of the Tōhoku region. It is held in the capital city of Yamagata, Yamagata Prefecture. The hanagasa is a headpiece that is shaped like a flower and was traditionally dyed red from locally grown safflower.

== History and organization ==
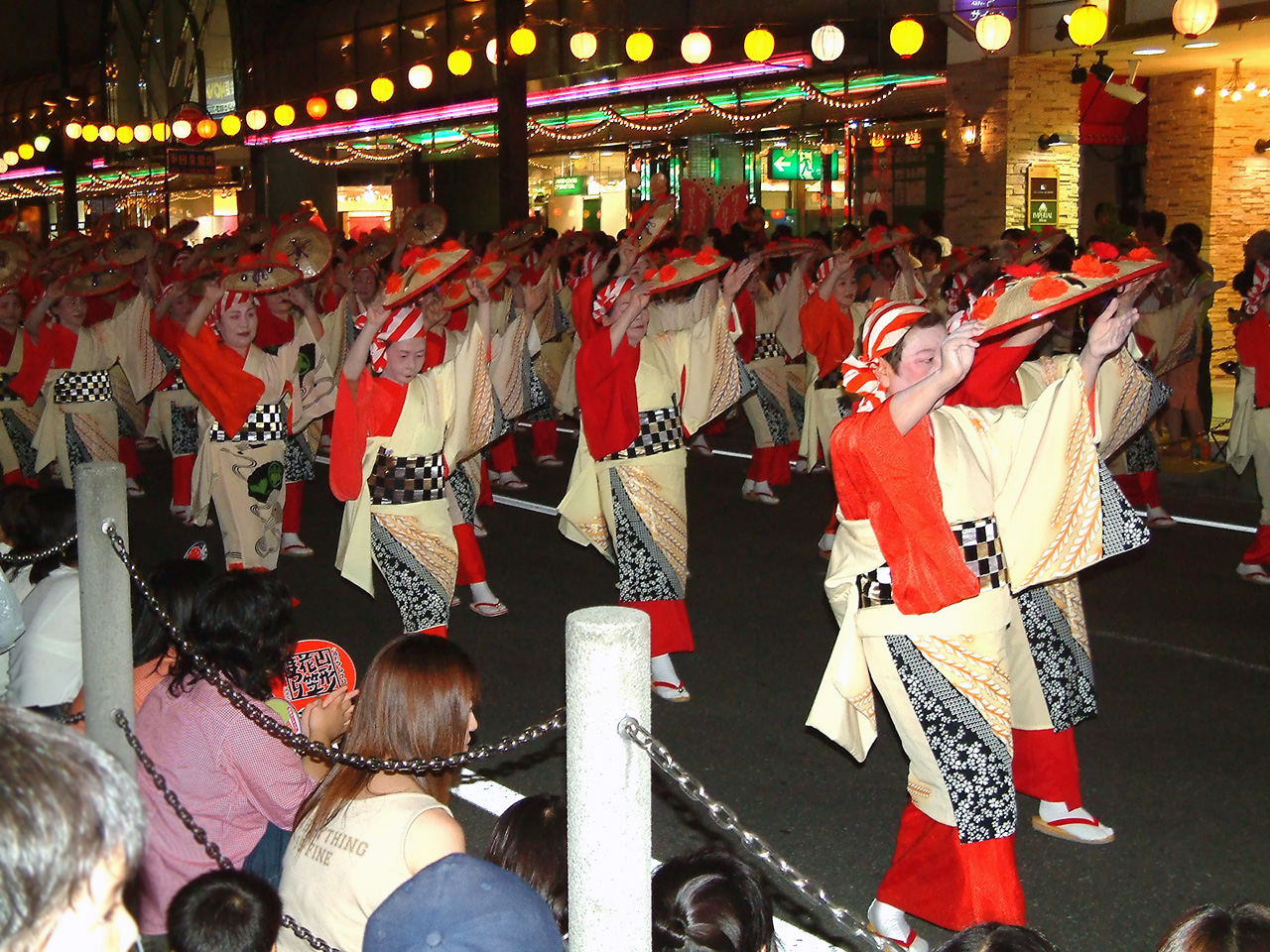
Dancers in the festival's parade

The Yamagata Hanagasa Matsuri is an annual summer festival that lasts from 5 August to 7 August on Friday, Saturday, and Sunday during the first weekend of August. It was first celebrated in 1963 when the parade was a part of the Zaō Summer Festival as an event to attract tourists to Yamagata Prefecture. After some success the parade grew over time into one of the four major festivals of the Tōhoku region. Ten thousand dancers dance to the "Hanagasa Ondo" song in the parade.

The song's creation is attributed to workers who were constructing an embankment in 1919 along Lake Tokura in the city of Obanazawa in northeastern Yamagata Prefecture. The song was created as workers compacted dirt into the embankment, they would rhythmically chant "yassho" followed with a response "makasho". Following the completion of the embankment, the community that built it held a parade where they all wore sedge hats that were dyed red with safflower, a crop of the region. These red sedge hats, called hanagasa became the focal point of the parade.

While the Hanagasa festival is still held in smaller towns and cities throughout the prefecture, including Obanazawa, the largest festival takes place in the city of Yamagata, where its parade follows the city's main street, National Route 112, in the Honcho district.

This parade runs through the Nanukamachi district of downtown Yamagata City and ends at the Bunshokan Prefectural Museum, the former prefectural office of Yamagata. As of 2022, the Hanagasa Festival now operates as normal after a 3 year absence during the pandemic.
