= Yama-dera =

Buddhist temple in Yamagata Prefecture, Japan

Risshaku-ji 立石寺
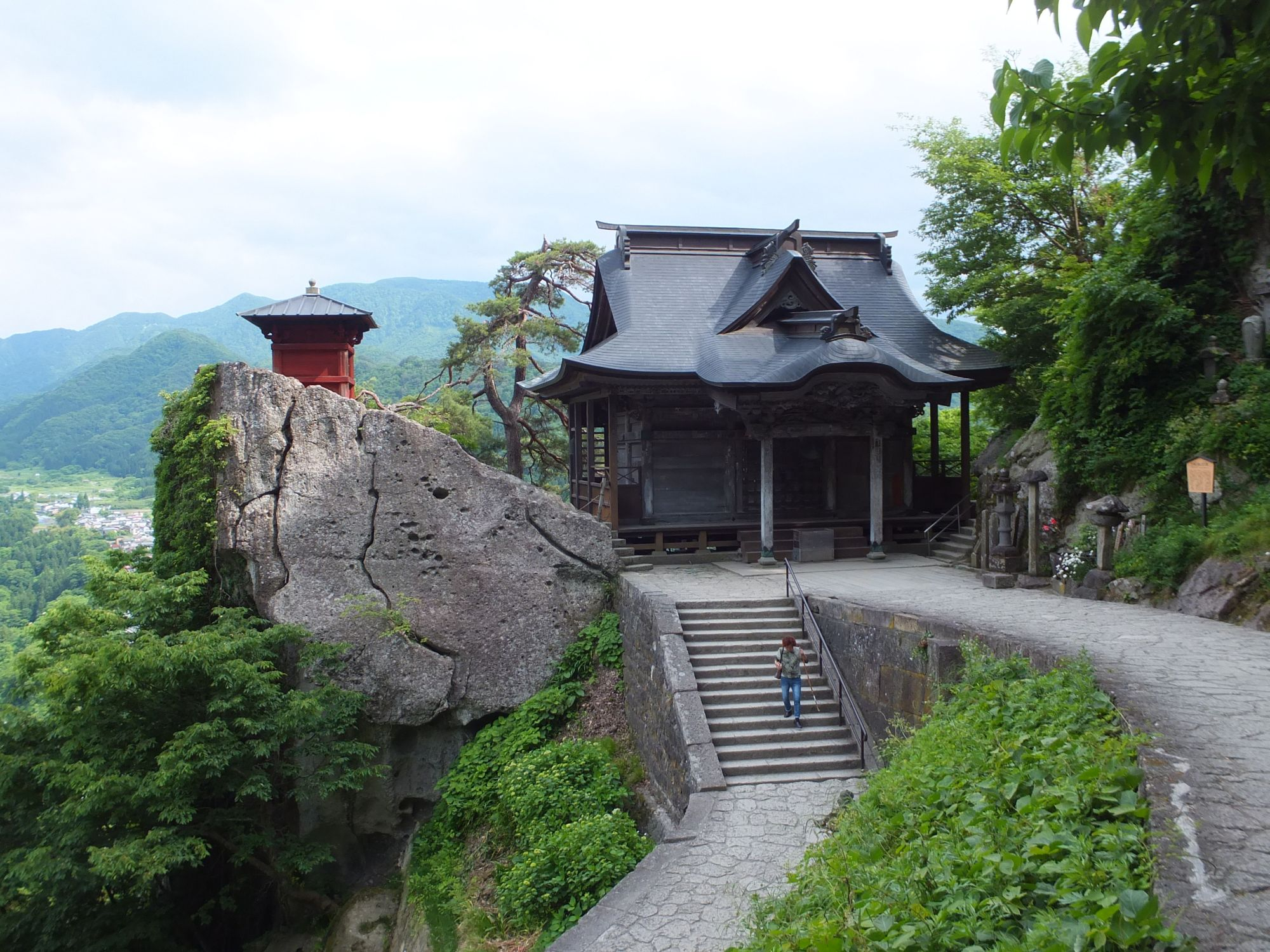
- The Risshaku-ji sutra repository and Founder's Hall

- Location within Yamagata Prefecture Location within Japan

Religion
- Affiliation: Buddhist
- Deity: Yakushi Nyorai
- Rite: Tendai
- Status: functional

Location
- Location: 4456-1 Yamadera, Yamagata, Yamagata Prefecture
- Country: Japan
- Coordinates: 38°18′45.2″N 140°26′14.6″E

Architecture
- Founder: Ennin
- Completed: 860 AD

Website
- Official website

You may also be looking for the voice actor Kōichi Yamadera.

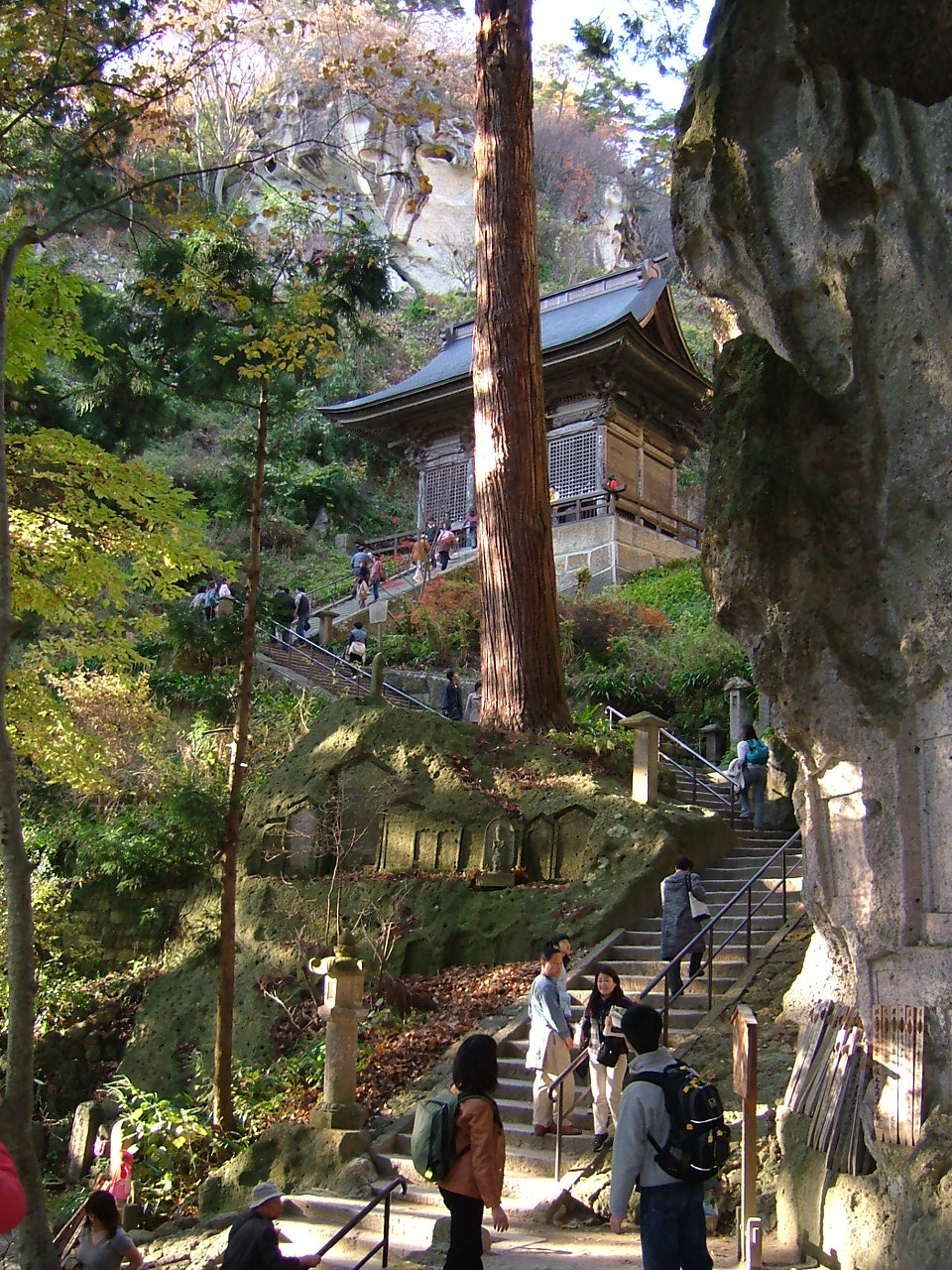
A view halfway up the temple complex

Yama-dera (山寺, lit. "Mountain Temple") (山号 宝珠山; Sangō Hōshu-zan) is the popular name for the Buddhist temple of Risshaku-ji (立石寺) located northeast of Yamagata, in Yamagata Prefecture, Japan. Its main image is a hibutsu statue of Yakushi Nyorai. The temple has been a place for pilgrimage for centuries, and is designated as both a Place of Scenic Beauty and as a National Historic Site It is located within the borders of the Zaō Quasi-National Park. The temple buildings clinging to the steep, forested, rocky hillsides are picturesque and unusual.

== History ==
According to temple tradition, it was founded in 860 AD by the priest Ennin, who is better known by his posthumous name, Jikaku Daishi (慈覺大師). In 847 AD Ennin returned to Japan from studies in Tang dynasty China and in 854 AD he became the chief priest of the Tendai sect at Enryaku-ji on Mt. Hiei near Kyoto. Risshaku-ji was founded as a branch temple of Enryaku-ji by the order of Emperor Seiwa, and to this day the ritual fire brought from Enryaku-ji is still burning in the main temple. The exact date and circumstances of the foundation of the temple are uncertain, but it dates to at least the early Heian period based on dating of the oldest of its surviving wooden statuary. The temple has a long-standing tradition that it houses the grave of Ennin in a cave within the temple grounds. Although Ennin died on Mount Hiei in 864 AD, and there is no record that his remains were transferred here, an archaeological investigation in 1948 found a gold-leaf encrusted casket containing five sets of human remains and fragments of a Heian period wooden statue of Ennin within the cave. The temple developed into the major Heian period center for Buddhism in Dewa Province (now Yamagata and Akita prefectures).

The temple was patronized by the Kamakura shogunate and grew in territory. It was rebuilt after a fire in the mid-13th century and was converted to Zen Buddhism. The current Main Hall, known here as the Konpon-chūdō was rebuilt in 1356 by Shiba Kaneyori, lord of Yamagata Castle, who also returned it to the Tendai sect. It was visited by the artist Sesshū Tōyō in 1482, who made many sketches of its precincts. The temple was burned down again during the wars of the Sengoku period, but was restored by the Date clan and the Mogami clan. Under the Edo Period Tokugawa shogunate, it was awarded estates with a kokudaka of 1420 koku for its upkeep.

Yama-dera is where the well-known haiku poet Matsuo Bashō wrote his famous haiku "ah this silence / sinking into the rocks / voice of cicada" in 1689. A museum of Basho's writings and paintings and other related art, the Yamadera Basho Memorial Museum, is a short walk up the hill on the opposite side of the steep valley. In 1996, the Ministry of the Environment selected the cicadas of Yama-dera as one of the 100 Soundscapes of Japan.

== Important cultural properties ==
- Building: Konpon-chūdō, built between 1346 and 1370 and repaired in 1608.
- Building: Three-storied Miniature Pagoda (height 2.5 meters), built in 1519 and housed in a stone chapel
- Monument: Stone stele inscribed with the Lotus Sutra, dated 1144
- Statue: Yakushi Nyorai, wooden, seated, Heian-period, repaired in 1205.
- Statue: Ennin (head portion only), wooden, Heian-period. recovery from alleged grave-tomb of Ennin

These historical assets can be seen along the main trail that leads up the mountain along its stone steps. You can also see the remains of the original temple of Yamadera in a course located to the right of the main entrance.

Yamadera holds many other important cultural assets in its treasure house, the Hihokan, including standing wooden images of Shaka Nyorai, Yakushi Nyorai and Amida Nyorai, a seated wooden image of Dengyo Daishi, a hanging wooden mandala of Buddha.

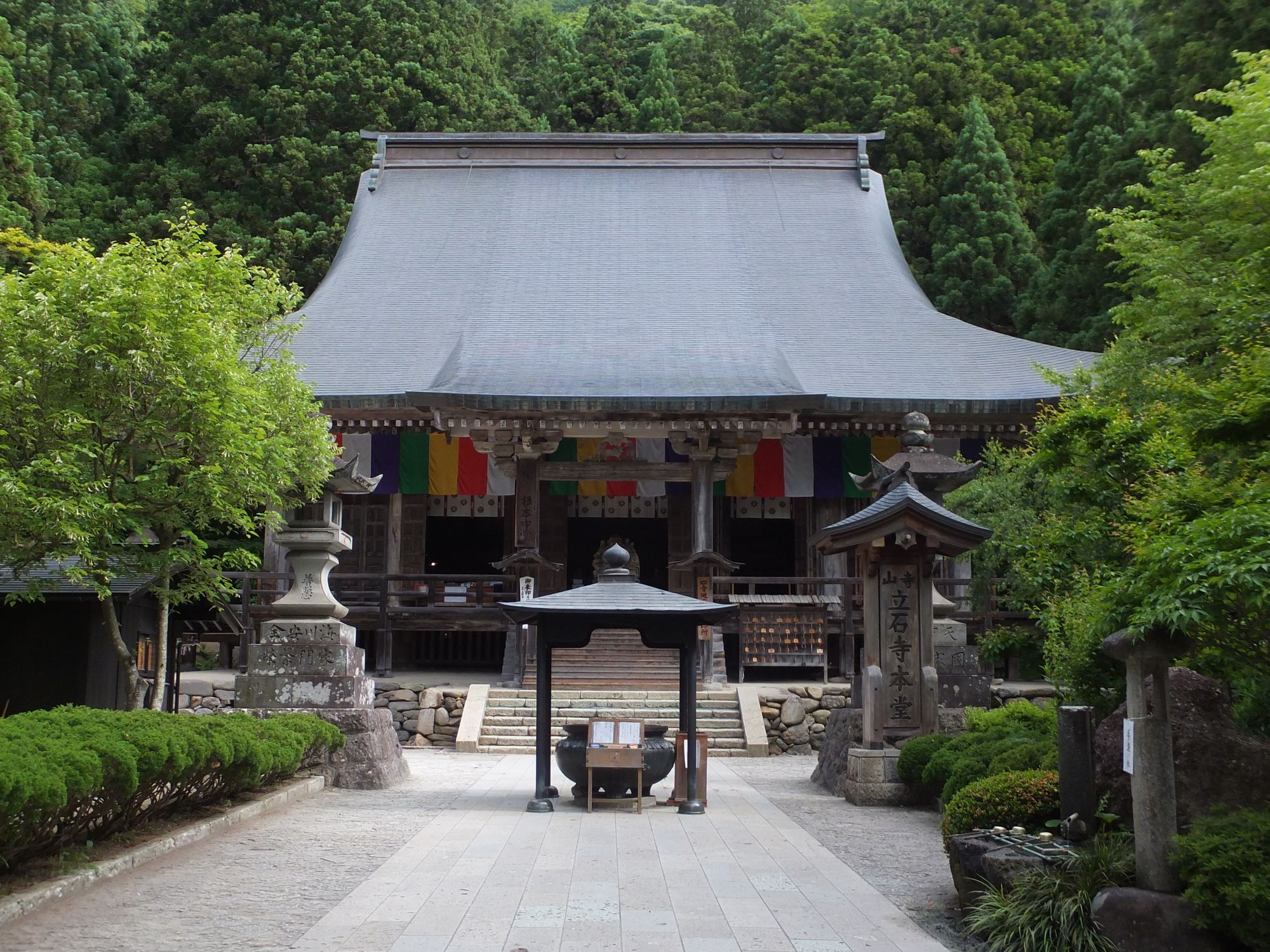
Konpon-chūdō (main hall)

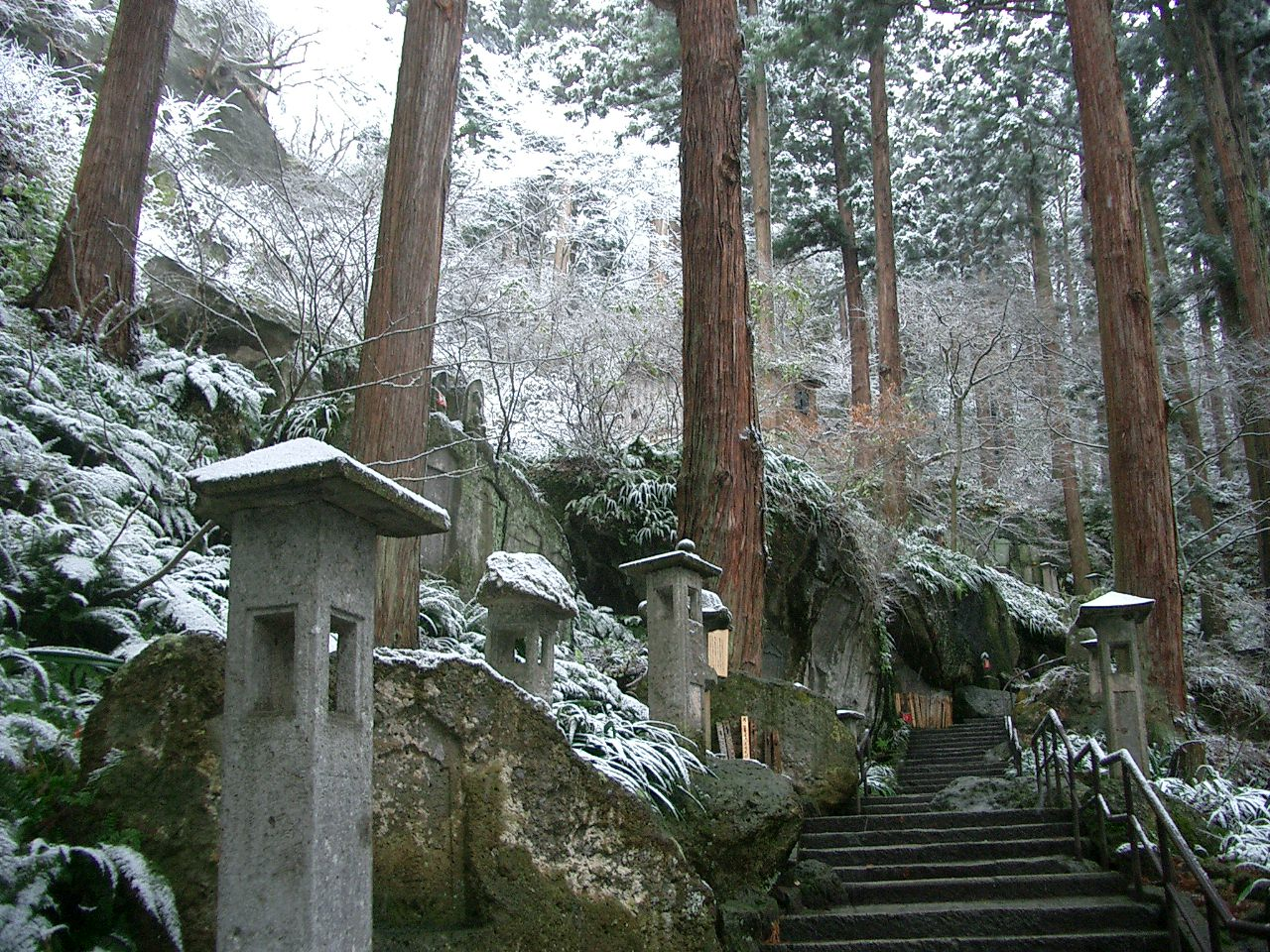
Approach in winter

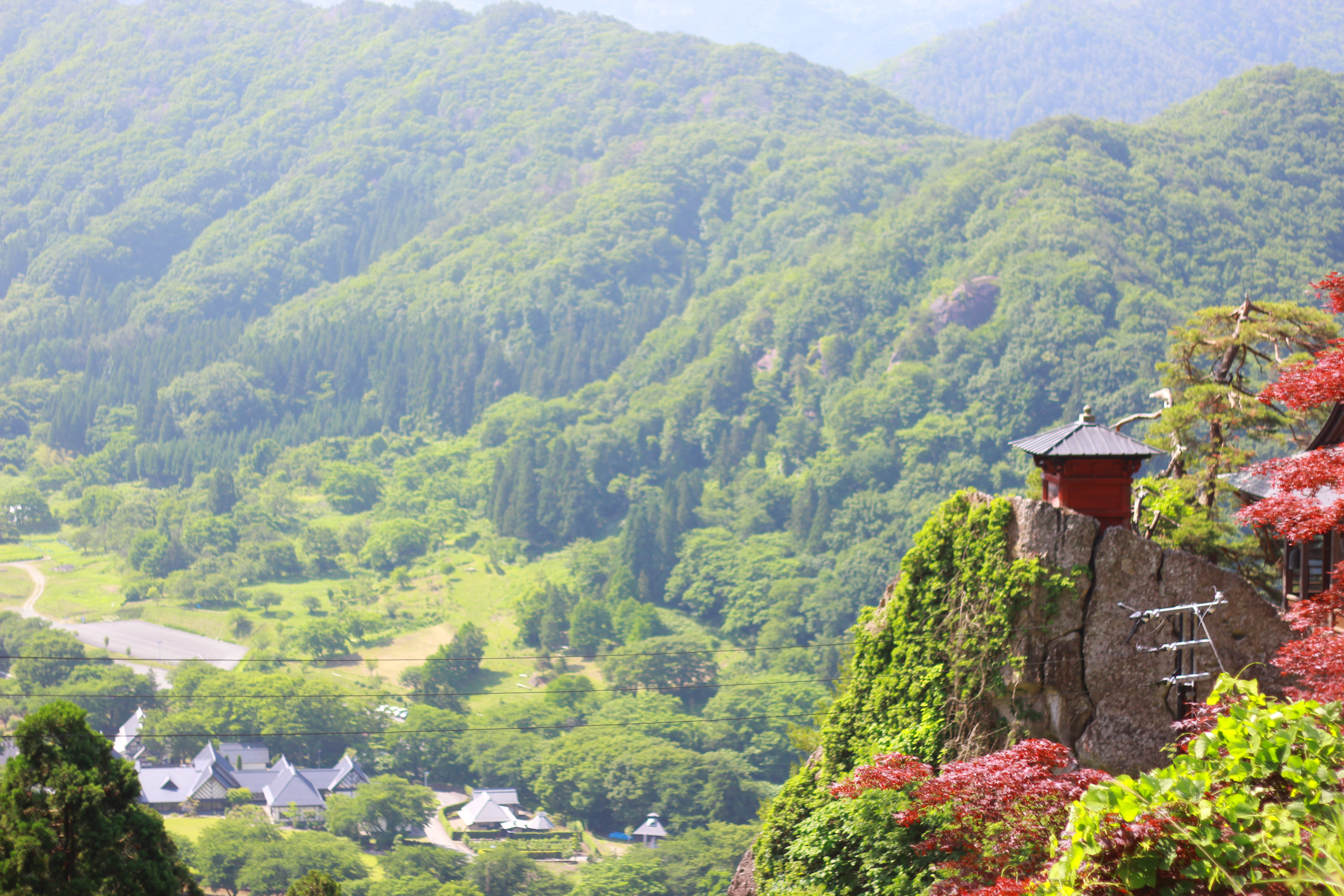
View from the top (sutra repository in sight)

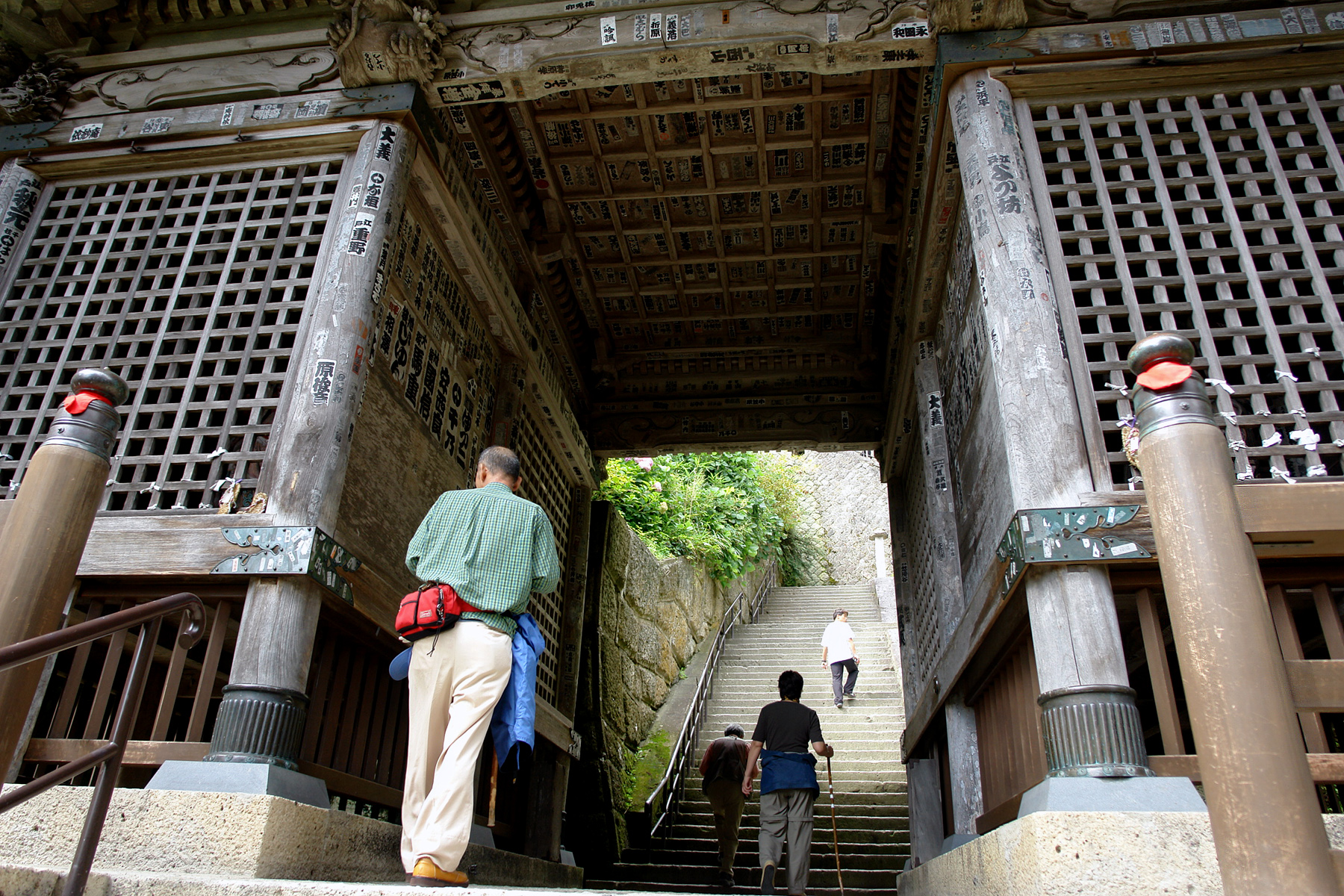
Niomon

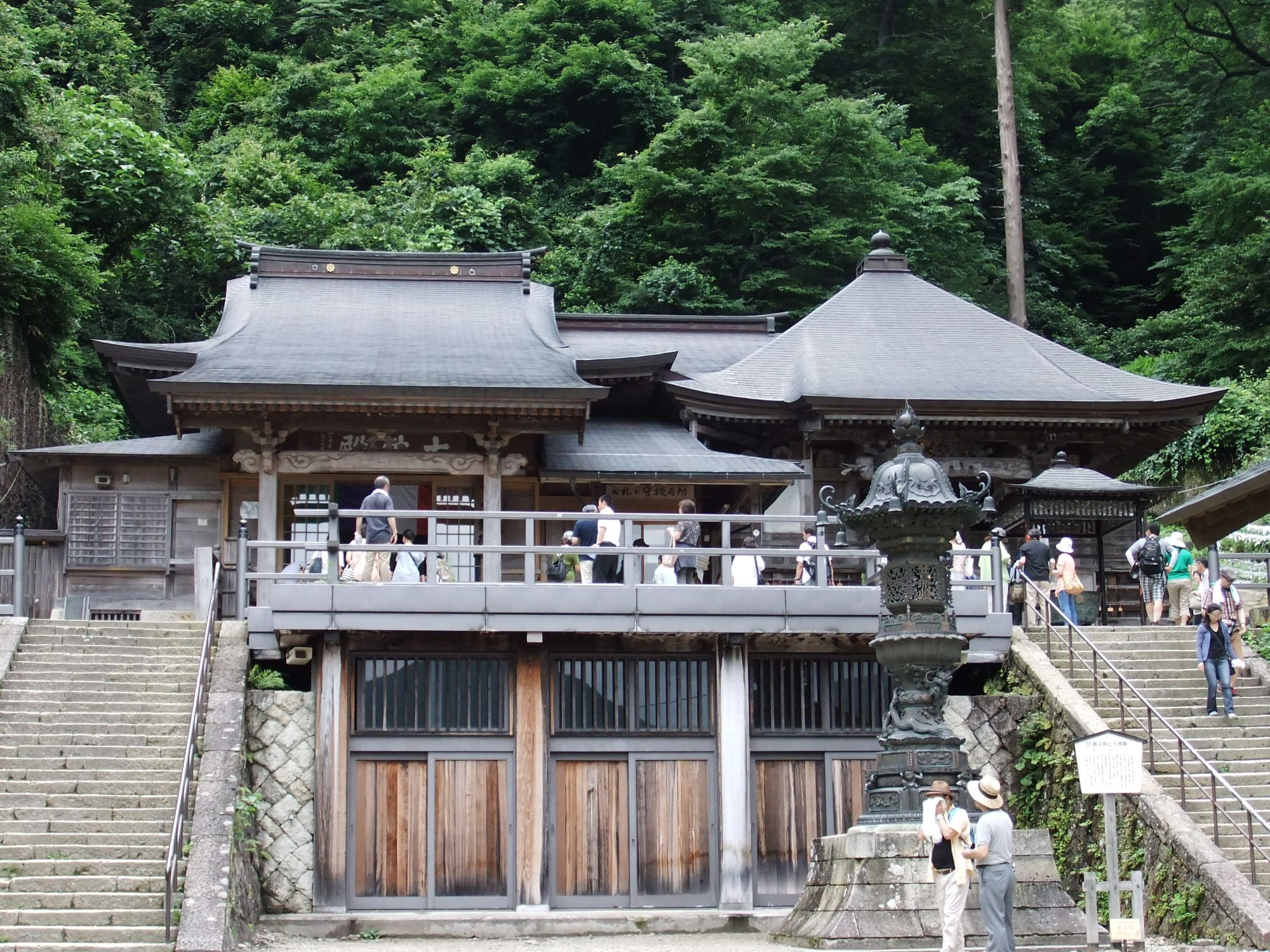
Oku-no-In

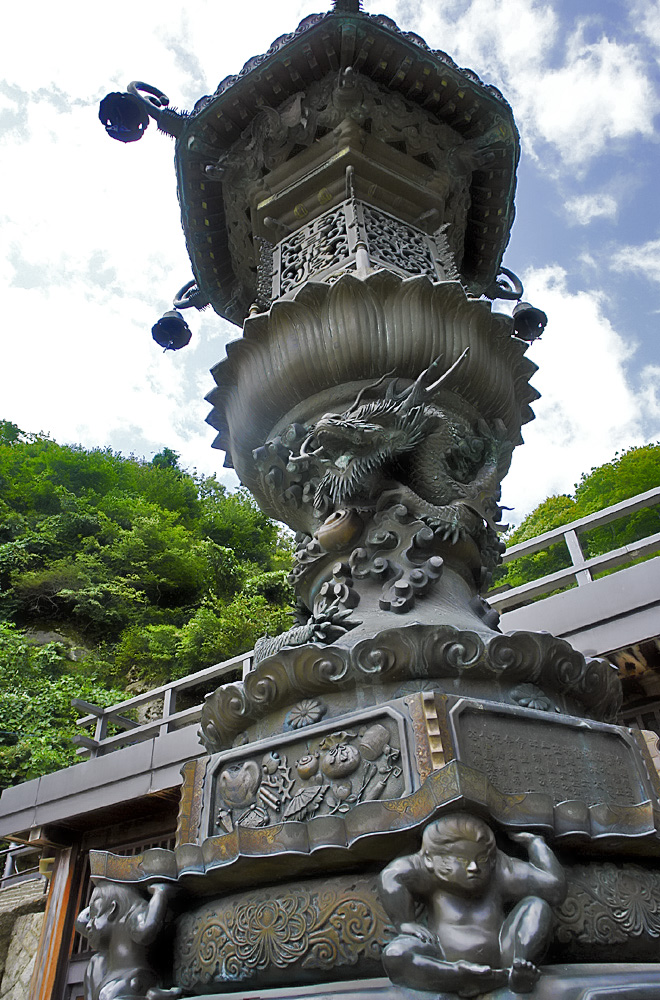
Lantern

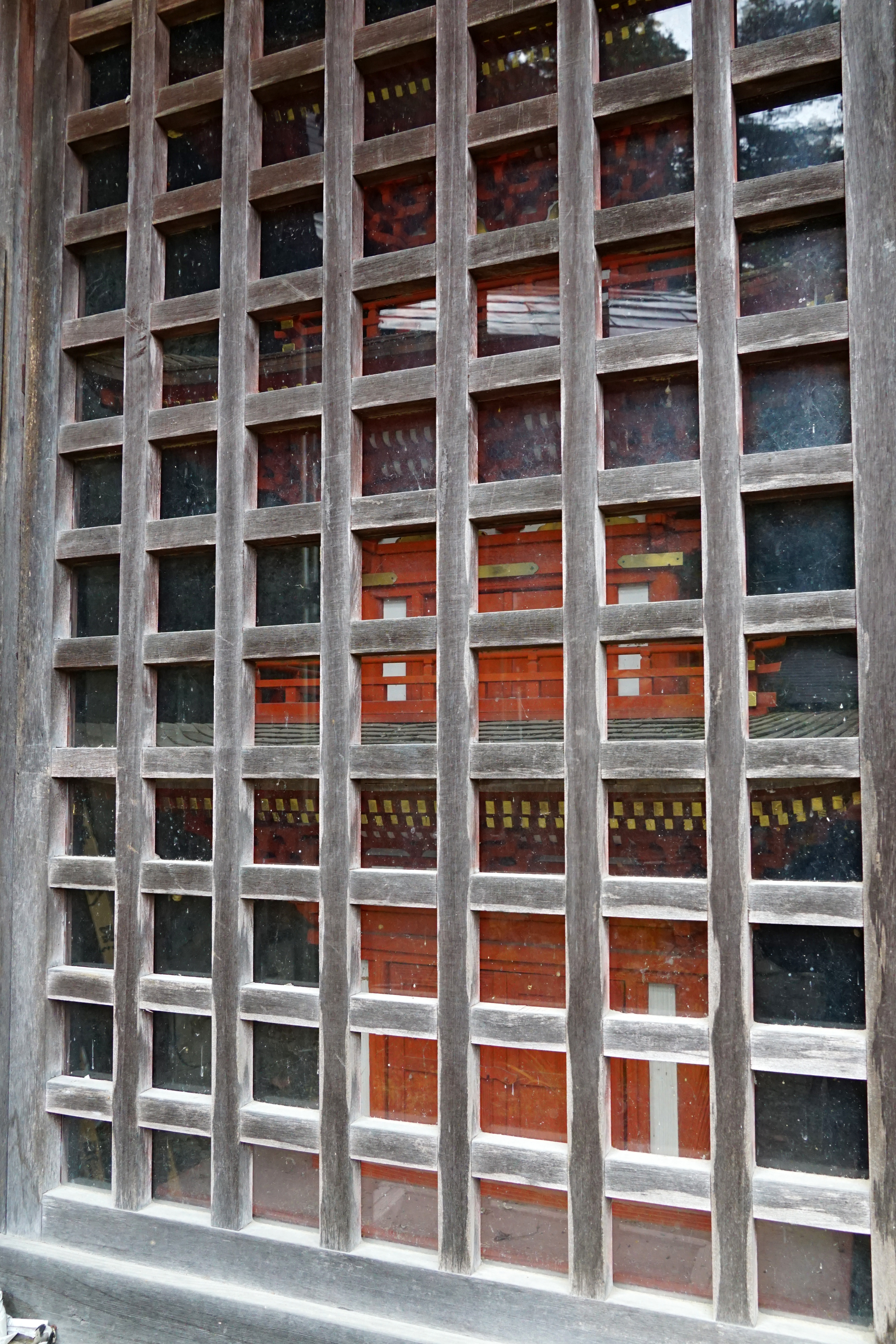
Three-storied Miniature Pagoda

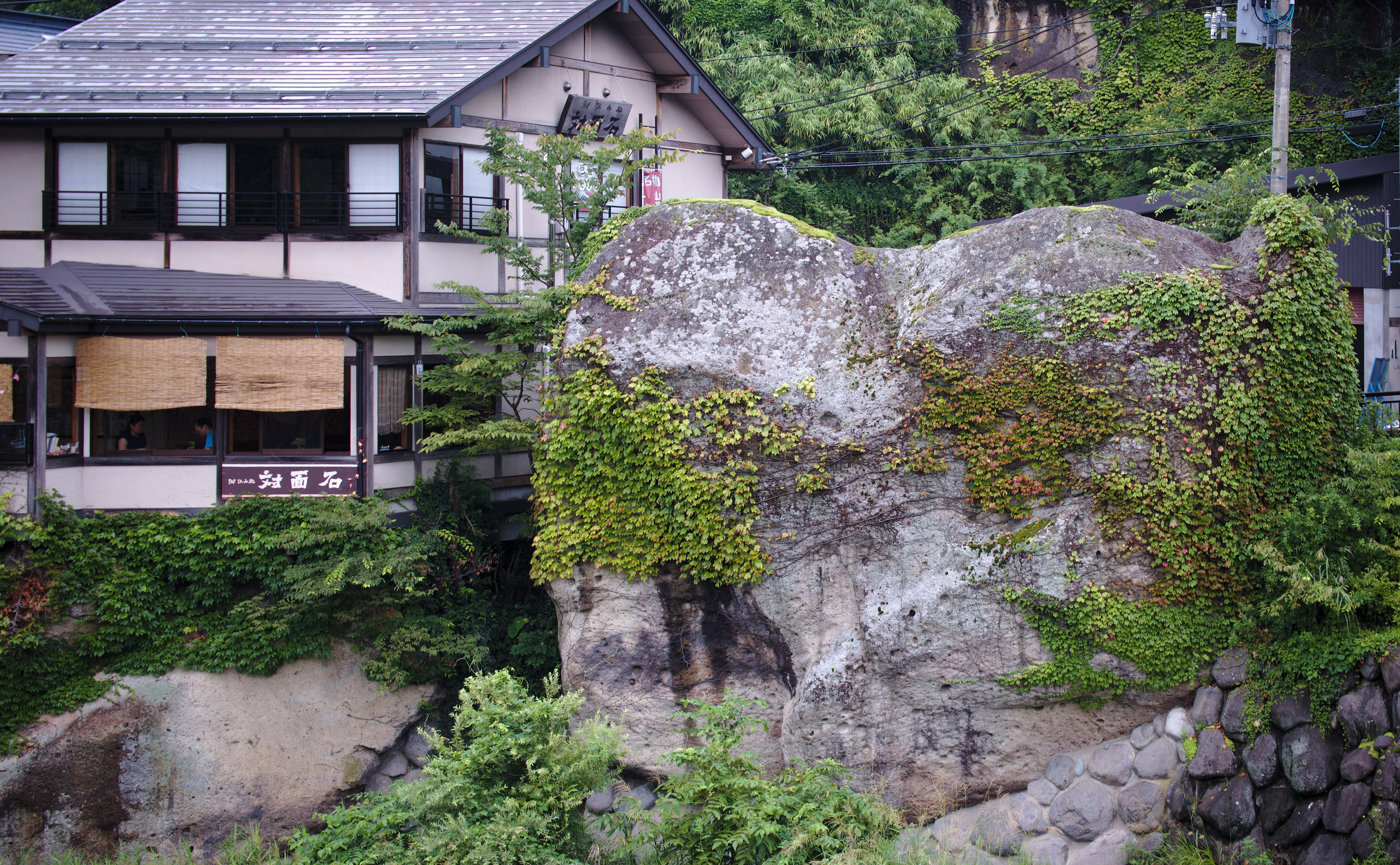
The Taimenseki (対面石) where Ennin is said to have met Banji Banzaburō

== Access ==
=== Railway ===
JR East – Senzan Line

- Yamadera (7 minutes' walk away from the entrance to the mountain)

=== Highway ===
- Yamagata Expressway – Yamagata-kita Interchange, located about 10 km from the temple
- Yamagata Prefectural Road Route 19 (山形県道19号山形山寺線)
- Yamagata Prefectural Road Route 62 (山形県道62号仙台山寺線)

== See also ==
- List of Historic Sites of Japan (Yamagata)
- List of Places of Scenic Beauty of Japan (Yamagata)
