= Urushiyama Station =

Railway station in Yamagata, Yamagata Prefecture, Japan

Urushiyama Station 漆山駅
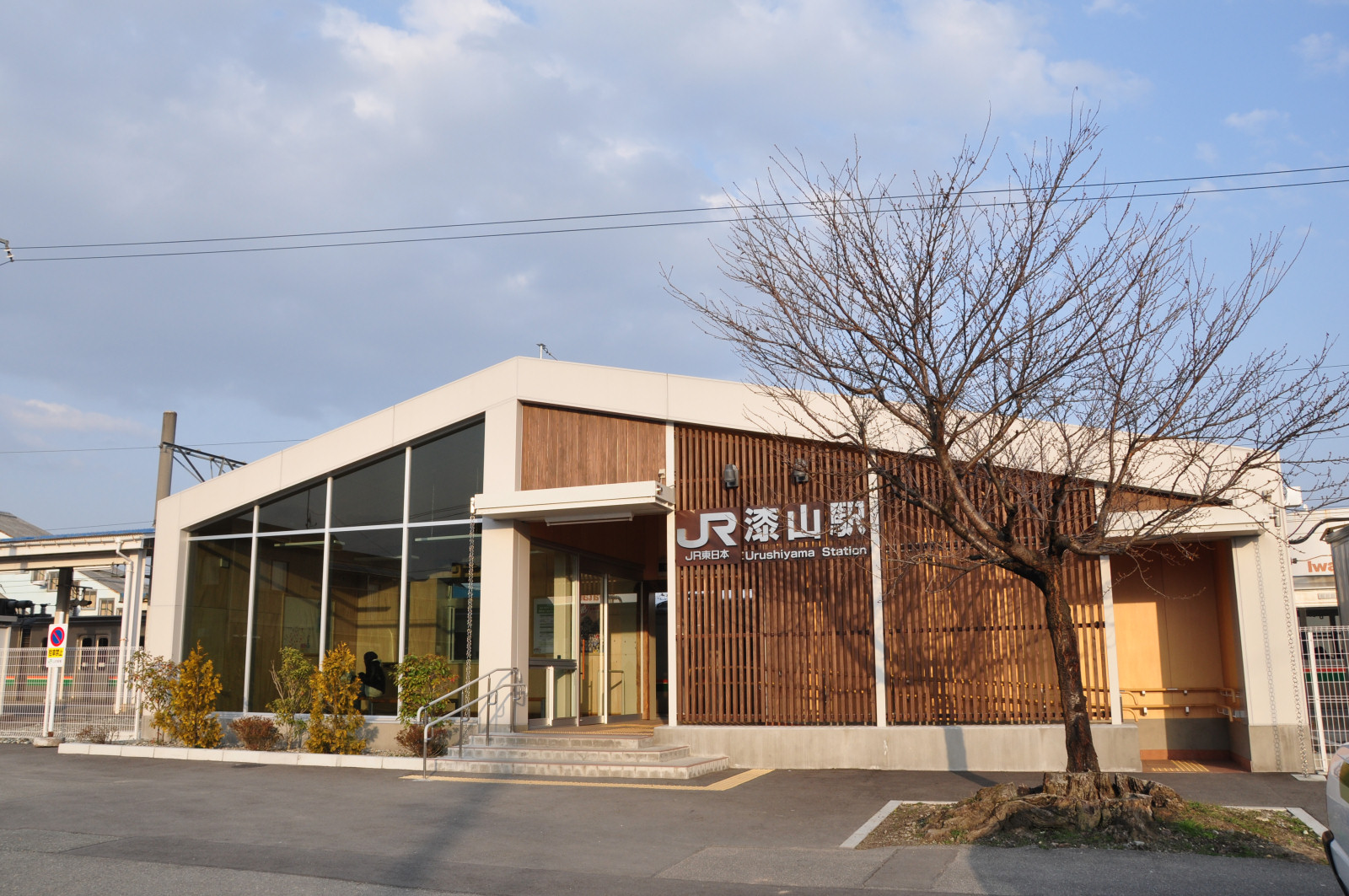
- Urushiyama Station in March 2010

General information
- Location: Urushiyama, Yamagata-shi, Yamagata-ken 990-2161; Japan
- Coordinates: 38°18′52″N 140°20′51″E
- Operator: JR East
- Line: ■ Ōu Main Line
- Distance: 94.9 km from Fukushima
- Platforms: 2 side platforms

Other information
- Status: Unstaffed

History
- Opened: November 1, 1902

Services
Preceding station	JR East	Following station
Minami-Dewa towards Fukushima	Yamagata Line	Takatama towards Shinjō
Location
- Location within Yamagata Prefecture Location within Japan

Urushiyama Station (漆山駅, Urushiyama-eki) is a railway station in the city of Yamagata, Yamagata Prefecture, Japan, operated by East Japan Railway Company (JR East).

== Lines ==
Urushiyama Station is served by the Ōu Main Line, and is located 94.9 rail kilometers from the terminus of the line at Fukushima Station.

== Station layout ==
The station has two opposed side platforms connected by a footbridge. Track one is adjacent to the station building; track 2 is on a passing loop. The station is unattended.

=== Platforms ===
1	■ Ōu Main Line	for Yamagata, and Yonezawa
2	■ Ōu Main Line	for Tendō and Shinjō

== History ==
Urushiyama Station opened on November 1, 1902. The station was absorbed into the JR East network upon the privatization of JNR on April 1, 1987. A new station building was completed in March 2009.

== Surrounding area ==
Since December 1946 the Topcon factory has been next to the station.

== See also ==
- List of railway stations in Japan
