= Kakegoe =

Shouts by the audience in Japanese performances

Kakegoe (掛け声) usually refers to shouts and calls used in performances of traditional Japanese music, kabuki theatre, and in martial arts such as kendo.

== Kabuki ==
In the kabuki theatre, the term is used to refer to melodramatic calls from an audience, or as part of call-and-response singing in Japanese folk music. It is a custom for people in the audience to insert kakegoe every so often, in praise of the actors on stage. There are special climaxes in kabuki theatre called mie, where the actor puts on an extravagant pose and someone in the audience shouts the actor's stage name or guild name at just the right moment.

Occasionally the shout is not a name, for example "Mattemashita!" ("This is what we've been waiting for!") as the curtain is drawn back.

There are three kakegoe guilds in Tokyo, totalling about 60 members. They receive free passes to the Kabuki-za. Almost all are mature male Japanese, but there have been examples of women and foreigners.

== Folk music ==
In folk music some kakegoe are inserted in parts of song at will. Rather than names, kakegoe are usually words of encouragement for the musicians, singers, or dancers performing with the music. A commonly used word is "sore!", meaning "that", which conveys the sense "That's the way!", or "Just like that!" Another is "dontokoi!" meaning something like "Gimme your best shot!" or literally "Come quickly/don't hesitate!" "Sate!" means "So then!" Other words are "yoisho!", "yoi yoi yoi!", and "choi choi!" Kakegoe are also used in Buyō dancing, when the stage name of the performer is shouted at key points in a dance.

A great deal of kakegoe are usually unvoiced parts of the repeating chorus of the song. In a famous folk song called "Soran Bushi" the shout "ah dokkoisho, dokkoisho!" is said at the end of each verse. The verses of the song "Mamurogawa Ondo" always end in "ah dontokoi, dontokoi!" Some shouts are area-specific. In the Hanagasa Odori (Flower Hat Dance) of Yamagata, for example, the shout at the end of each verse is "ha yassho makasho!" (See Hanagasa Ondo.) This is a kakegoe heard only in this particular song and no others. "Ha iya sasa!" and "A hiri hiri" are shouts specific to Okinawan folk music.

== Traditional music ensembles ==
Kakegoe are used in traditional music ensembles, such as Hayashi, Nagauta, Taiko, and Tsugaru-jamisen. They are used to cue different parts of a musical piece. They can signal anywhere from the beginning or end of a particular rhythm, the beginning or end of an improvisation section for an instrument virtuoso, to cuing different instrument entrances. In Taiko, for example, there are certain rhythms that repeat until the leader shouts the go-ahead. In Tsugaru-Jamisen, a great deal of improvisation is used, and the player has to cue the drum when he is ready to end a session of improvisation. In larger music ensembles such as Hayashi and Nagauta, musicians need to tell each other where they are in a piece, so they use kakegoe to signal the ending/beginning of a section.

== Matsuri festivals ==
Kakegoe can also be heard in different matsuri. These also vary from region to region. In parts of Tokyo, mikoshi, or float shrines are hoisted by people yelling "Yassho! Yassho!" The Hamamatsu Matsuri is famous for its enormous kites and large wooden carts called 屋台, yatai that are taken throughout the city. Each kite and cart has their own represented guilds, and each group marches through the streets to the beats of snare drums and bugles chanting "Oisho! Oisho!" Another example is in Mie prefecture, at Kuwana City's Ishidori Matsuri where the chants of "Korasa" or "Hoisa" are used in the festival. This is shouted out by participants after a sequence of taiko drumming and hammering of the Kane on the traditional cart. The city of Kishiwada in Osaka prefecture is also famous for its cart or danjiri festival. Participants pulling the rolling shrines all yell "Yoi, sa! Yoi, sa!" as they pull the danjiri. The list goes on and on, but these shouts generally mean something like the English "heave, ho! heave, ho!" The pitch and inflection changes from district to district based on timing and rhythm.

== See also ==
- yagō—guild names or stage names of actors, which are shouted in kakegoe
