= Uzen-Chitose Station =

Railway station in Yamagata, Yamagata Prefecture, Japan

Uzen-Chitose Station 羽前千歳駅
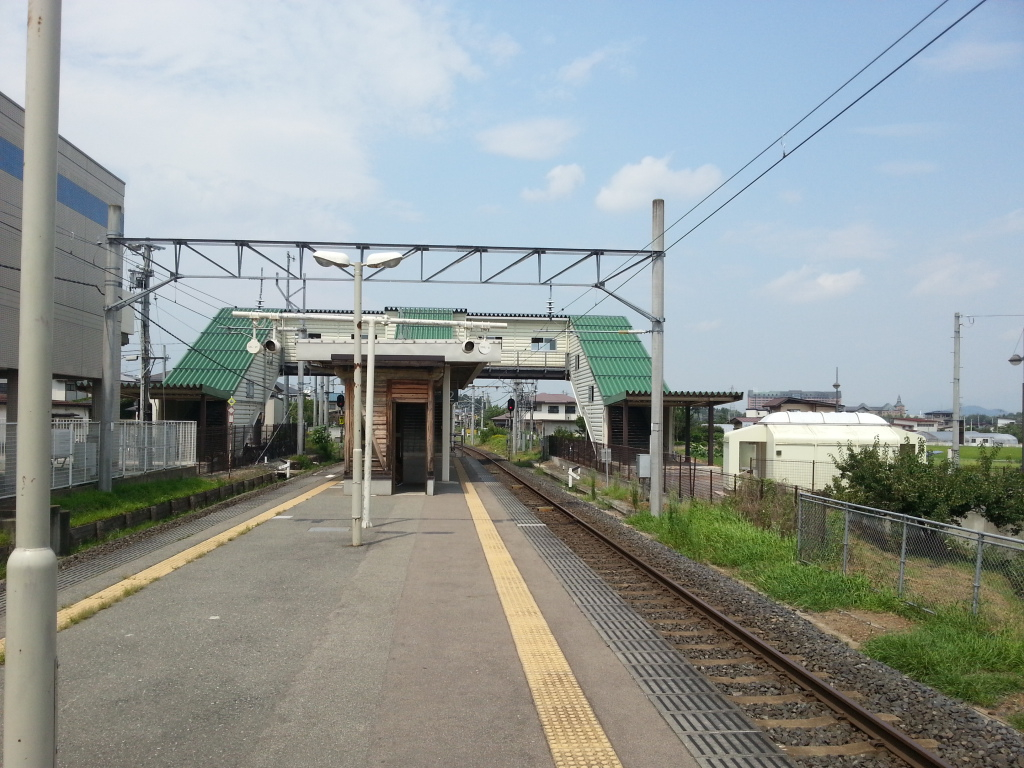
- Uzen-Chitose Station, August 2013

General information
- Location: 2-3 Nagamachi; Yamagata, Yamagata; Japan
- Coordinates: 38°17′16″N 140°20′32″E
- Operator: JR East
- Lines: Ōu Main Line; Senzan Line
- Distance: 91.9 km (57.1 mi) from Fukushima; 58.0 km (36.0 mi) from Sendai
- Platforms: 1 island platform

Construction
- Structure type: At-grade

Other information
- Status: Unstaffed

History
- Opened: 17 October 1933
- Rebuilt: 1999

Services
Preceding station	JR East	Following station
Kita-Yamagata towards Fukushima	Yamagata Line	Minami-Dewa towards Shinjō
Kita-Yamagata towards Yamagata	Senzan Line Rapid A C	Yamadera towards Sendai
Kita-Yamagata towards Yamagata	Senzan Line Rapid B Local	Tateyama towards Sendai
Route map
Location
- Location within Yamagata Prefecture Location within Japan

Uzen-Chitose Station (Japanese: 羽前千歳駅, Hepburn: Uzen-Chitose-eki) is a junction railway station in the city of Yamagata, Yamagata Prefecture, Japan, operated by East Japan Railway Company (JR East).

== Lines ==
Uzen-Chitose Station is served by the Ōu Main Line, and is located 91.9 kilometres (57.1 mi) from the terminus of the line at Fukushima. It is also served by the Senzan Line and is 58.0 km (36.0 mi) from the terminus of that line at Sendai.

== Station layout ==
The station is an elevated station with a single island platform, with the station building located on the footbridge connecting the platform with the street on either side. The station is unattended.

One side of the platform serves the standard gauge track of the Ōu Main Line, which is used by Yamagata Line and Yamagata Shinkansen trains, the other side serves the narrow gauge track of the Senzan Line.

=== Platforms ===
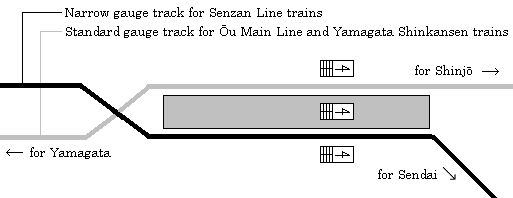
Track diagram

1	■ Yamagata Line	for Shinjō or Fukushima
2	■ Senzan Line	for Yamagata or Sendai

== History ==
Uzen-Chitose Station opened on October 17, 1933. The station was absorbed into the JR East network upon the privatization of JNR on April 1, 1987. The station building was rebuilt in December 1999.

== Surrounding area ==
- Yamagata Big Wing Convention center
- Yamagata General Sports Arena
