= Toshio Gotō =

Japanese film director (1938–2025)

Toshio Gotō (後藤 俊夫, Gotō Toshio; 1938 – 22 November 2025) was a Japanese film director. He was born in Ina, Nagano, Japan and was primarily known for films about humanity's relationship with nature.

Gotō worked as an assistant director of Satsuo Yamamoto from 1962 to 1978. He made his directorial debut in 1978 with Komugīro no tenshi suzume to shōnen. His 2009 film Beauty was entered into the 31st Moscow International Film Festival.

Gotō died from lymphoma on 22 November 2025, at the age of 87.

== Filmography ==
=== Director ===
- Wheat-Colored Angel: Sparrow and Boys (Japanese: こむぎいろの天使 雀と少年, Hepburn: Komugīro no tenshi suzume to shōnen) (1978)
- The Old Bear Hunter (Japanese: マタギ, Hepburn: Matagi) (1982, also co-wrote) – Gotō received the Minister of Education's Art Encouragement Prize for New Artists for his work on the film.
- Hello Harness (Japanese: こんにちはハーネス, Hepburn: Konnichiwa Hânesu) (1983)
- Born Wild, Run Free (Japanese: イタズ 熊, Hepburn: Itazu Kuma), also known as The Forest of the Little Bear (1987) – Junko Sakurada won the 12th Hochi Film Award for Best Supporting Actress for her performance in this film. Itazu Kuma was also nominated in four categories at the 11th Japan Academy Awards: Best Supporting Actress (Junko Sakurada), Best Editing (Jun Nabeshima), Best Music Score (Masaru Sato) and Best Sound (Tsutomu Honda).
- Under Northern Lights (Japanese: オーロラの下で, Hepburn: Orora no Shita de), also known as Under Aurora or Beneath the Aurora (1990) – Co-director & co-writer alongside Petras Abukiavicus and Sergei Vronsky. The film is set in Siberia and stars Koji Yakusho in the lead role.
  - (Russian: Под северным сиянием, romanized: Pod severnym siyaniyem)
- Da Chan in Vietnam (Japanese: ベトナムのダーちゃん, Hepburn: Betonamu no dâchan) (1994, also co-wrote) – Based on Katsumoto Saotome's 1974 illustrated children's novel of the same name about the Vietnam War.
- The Day the Earth Moved (Japanese: 地球が動いた日, Hepburn: Chikyû ga ugoita hi) (1997) – Anime film depicting the Kobe earthquake and its aftermath.
- Minakuro the Bear and Grandpa Kouhei (Japanese: ミナクロと公平じいさん, Hepburn: Kuma no Minakuro to Kouhei Jiisan) (1999) – Anime OVA/short film based on a children's novel, produced by Mushi Production and broadcast on television.
- Wheat-Colored Angel: Sugar Chase (Japanese: こむぎいろの天使 すがれ追い, Hepburn: Komugīro no tenshi sugare oi) (1999)
- Beauty (Japanese: Beauty うつくしいもの, Hepburn: Beauty: Utsukushii-mono) (2009)

A third Komugīro no tenshi film was planned but never realized.

=== Editing ===
- Yōjasō no Maō
