= Yamagata, Yamagata =

Yamagata 山形市
- Prefecture capital and Core city
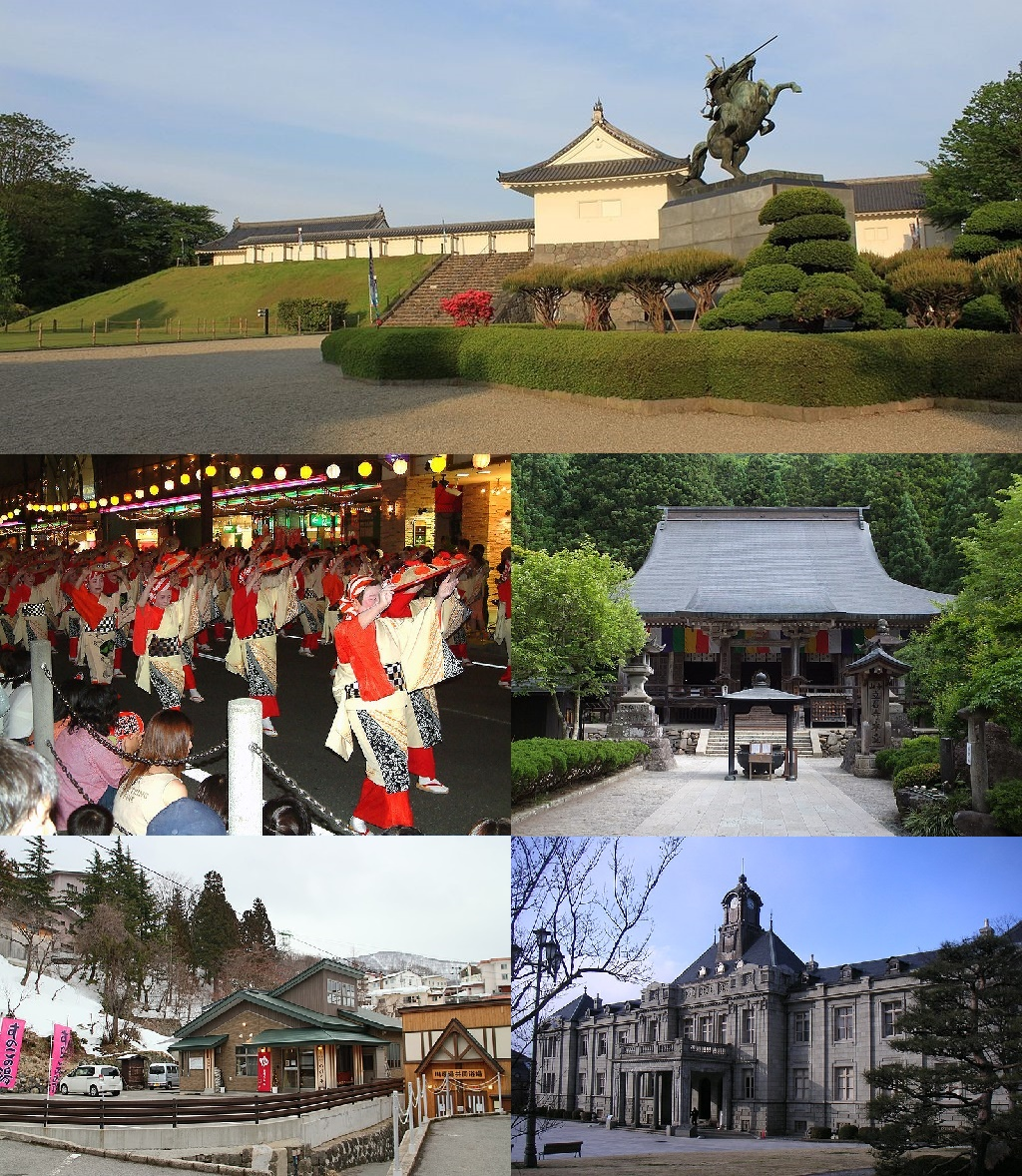
- Above:View of Kajō Park and Statue of Yoshiaki Mogami, Middle:Yamagata Hanagasa Festival, Yama-dera (Risshaku Temple), Bottom:Zaō Spa, Yamagata Prefectural Folk Museum (all items from left to right)

- Flag Seal

- Location of Yamagata in Yamagata Prefecture

- Coordinates: 38°15′19.5″N 140°20′22.6″E
- Country: Japan
- Region: Tōhoku
- Prefecture: Yamagata Prefecture
- First official recorded: 690 AD
- City Settled: April 1, 1889

Government
  - Mayor: Takahiro Satō

Area
  - Total: 381.30 km^{2} (147.22 sq mi)

Population (August 1, 2023)
  - Total: 242,505
  - Density: 636.00/km^{2} (1,647.2/sq mi)
- Time zone: UTC+9 (Japan Standard Time)
- Tree: Japanese Rowan
- Flower: Safflower
- Phone number: 023-641-1212
- Address: 2-3-25 Hatagomachi, Yamagata-shi, Yamagata-ken 990-8540
- Website: Official website

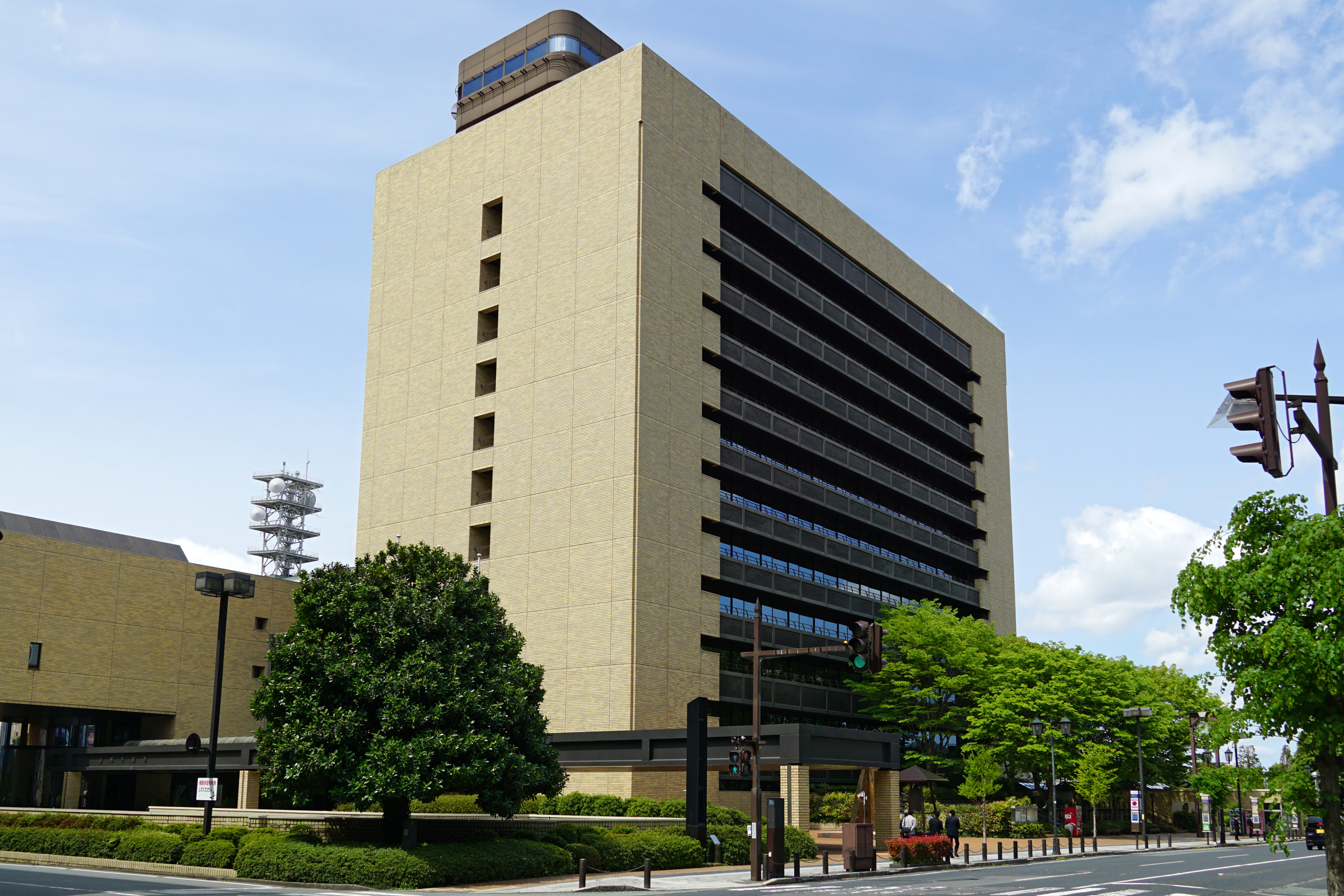
Yamagata city hall

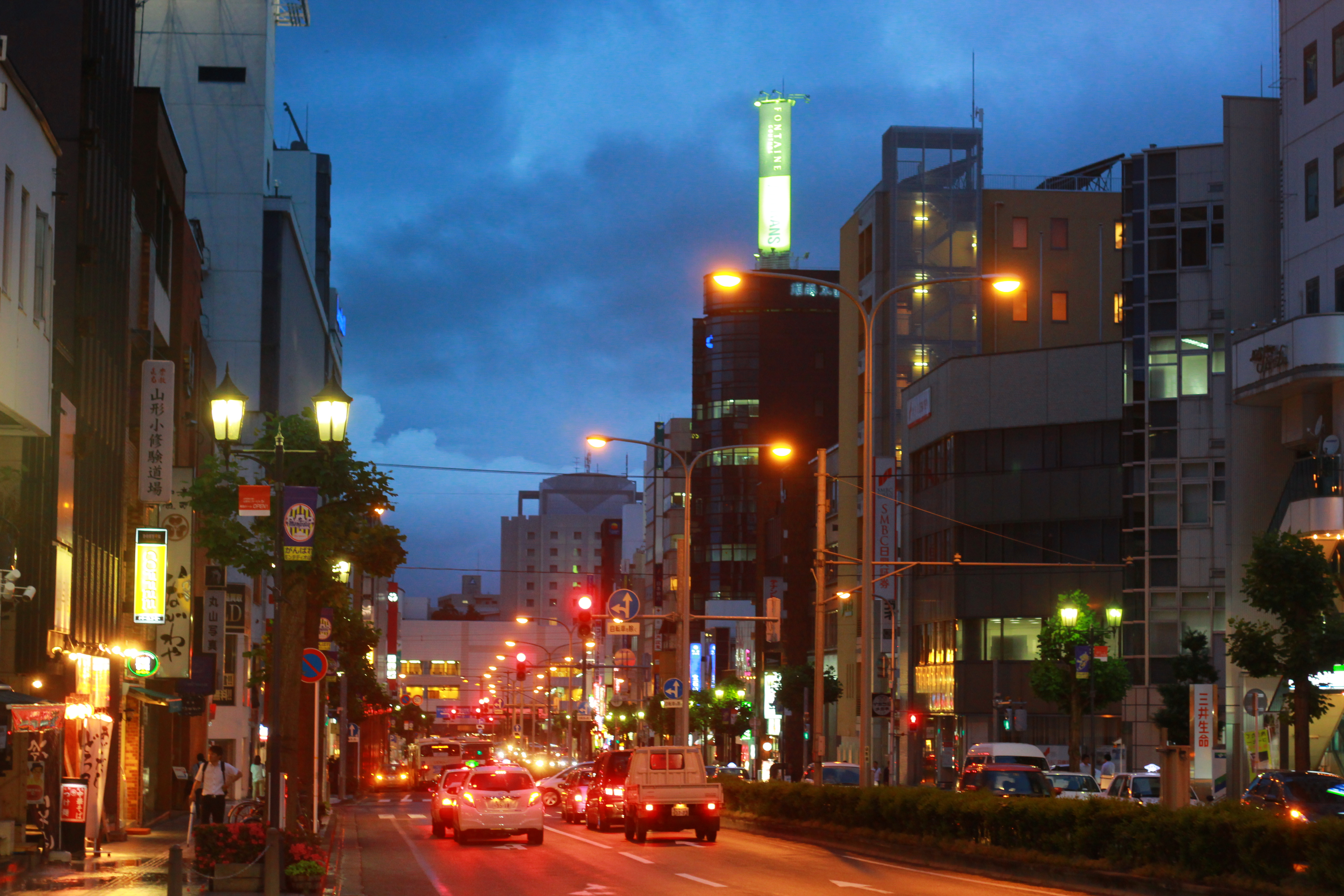
Downtown Yamagata, on the Yamagataekimae Ōdōri (Prefectural Road 16)

Yamagata (山形市, Yamagata-shi (Note: Japanese pronunciation: [jä̀.mä́.ɡä̀.tä̀, -ŋä̀.tä̀, -ɡä́.tä́.ɕì, -ŋä́.tä́-])) is the capital city of Yamagata Prefecture located in the Tōhoku region of northern Japan. As of 1 August 2023, the city had an estimated population of 242,505 in 103,165 households, and a population density of 636 persons per km^{2}. The total area of the city is 381.58 square kilometres (147 sq mi).

== Geography ==
Yamagata is in the southern portion of the Yamagata Basin in southeast Yamagata Prefecture. The northern and northwestern parts of the city are flatland, and the eastern part of the city is occupied by the Ōu Mountains. The city includes Mount Zaō within its borders. The Mamigasaki River passes through the city, and the Tachiyagawa River forms the border between Yamagata and Tendō.

=== Neighboring municipalities ===
- Miyagi Prefecture
  - Kawasaki
  - Sendai
- Yamagata Prefecture
  - Higashine
  - Kaminoyama
  - Nakayama
  - Nanyō
  - Tendō
  - Yamanobe

== Climate ==
Yamagata has a Humid continental climate (Köppen climate classification Dfa) closely bordering on Humid Subtropical climate (Köppen Cfa) with large seasonal temperature differences, with warm to hot (and often humid) summers and cold (sometimes severely cold) winters. Precipitation is significant throughout the year, but is heaviest from July to September. The average annual temperature in Yamagata is 11.7 °C (53.1 °F). The average annual rainfall is 1,163 millimetres (45.8 in) with July as the wettest month. The temperatures are highest on average in August, at around 25 °C (77 °F), and lowest in January, at around −0.1 °C (31.8 °F), just below the 0.0 °C (32.0 °F) isotherm required to earn the Humid Subtropical (Cfa) climate classification. Yamagata city is part of the heavy snow area of Japan (Gosetsu chitai, 豪雪地帯) with snowfall most days throughout the winter season.

Yamagata City is located in a wide central valley that can heat up quickly in spring and summer and is often grey and humid, while to the east in Miyagi Prefecture on the Pacific coast it is usually clearer and more temperate.

Climate data for Yamagata (elevation 152.5 m, 1991–2020 normals, extremes 1889–present)
Month	Jan	Feb	Mar	Apr	May	Jun	Jul	Aug	Sep	Oct	Nov	Dec	Year
Record high °C (°F)	18.1 (64.6)	18.9 (66.0)	23.7 (74.7)	33.3 (91.9)	34.6 (94.3)	37.5 (99.5)	40.8 (105.4)	39.0 (102.2)	36.6 (97.9)	32.3 (90.1)	26.9 (80.4)	20.6 (69.1)	40.8 (105.4)
Mean maximum °C (°F)	9.4 (48.9)	11.6 (52.9)	18.7 (65.7)	25.9 (78.6)	30.2 (86.4)	32.1 (89.8)	35.0 (95.0)	35.8 (96.4)	32.7 (90.9)	26.3 (79.3)	20.2 (68.4)	13.7 (56.7)	36.3 (97.3)
Mean daily maximum °C (°F)	3.3 (37.9)	4.4 (39.9)	9.1 (48.4)	16.4 (61.5)	22.6 (72.7)	25.9 (78.6)	29.1 (84.4)	30.5 (86.9)	25.8 (78.4)	19.5 (67.1)	12.6 (54.7)	6.1 (43.0)	17.1 (62.8)
Daily mean °C (°F)	−0.1 (31.8)	0.4 (32.7)	4.0 (39.2)	10.2 (50.4)	16.2 (61.2)	20.3 (68.5)	23.9 (75.0)	25.0 (77.0)	20.6 (69.1)	14.1 (57.4)	7.7 (45.9)	2.4 (36.3)	12.1 (53.8)
Mean daily minimum °C (°F)	−3.1 (26.4)	−3.1 (26.4)	−0.3 (31.5)	4.7 (40.5)	10.7 (51.3)	15.7 (60.3)	20.0 (68.0)	20.9 (69.6)	16.6 (61.9)	9.8 (49.6)	3.6 (38.5)	−0.7 (30.7)	7.9 (46.2)
Mean minimum °C (°F)	−7.4 (18.7)	−7.3 (18.9)	−4.6 (23.7)	−0.8 (30.6)	4.5 (40.1)	10.4 (50.7)	15.7 (60.3)	16.2 (61.2)	10.1 (50.2)	3.6 (38.5)	−1.7 (28.9)	−5.0 (23.0)	−8.1 (17.4)
Record low °C (°F)	−20.0 (−4.0)	−19.0 (−2.2)	−15.5 (4.1)	−7.3 (18.9)	−1.8 (28.8)	3.0 (37.4)	6.7 (44.1)	8.4 (47.1)	3.0 (37.4)	−2.4 (27.7)	−7.2 (19.0)	−15.0 (5.0)	−20.0 (−4.0)
Average precipitation mm (inches)	87.8 (3.46)	63.0 (2.48)	72.1 (2.84)	63.9 (2.52)	74.5 (2.93)	104.8 (4.13)	187.2 (7.37)	153.0 (6.02)	123.8 (4.87)	105.1 (4.14)	74.4 (2.93)	97.2 (3.83)	1,206.7 (47.51)
Average snowfall cm (inches)	103 (41)	79 (31)	35 (14)	2 (0.8)	0 (0)	0 (0)	0 (0)	0 (0)	0 (0)	0 (0)	4 (1.6)	66 (26)	285 (112)
Average precipitation days (≥ 0.5 mm)	18.6	14.9	14.5	11.2	10.2	11.1	14.1	11.5	11.9	11.9	14.2	17.8	162.1
Average snowy days	28.1	23.7	19.6	4.6	0.0	0.0	0.0	0.0	0.0	0.0	6.1	23.7	105.7
Average relative humidity (%)	81	77	69	62	64	71	76	75	77	77	78	81	74
Mean monthly sunshine hours	79.6	99.6	140.4	175.9	196.5	165.0	144.5	171.8	136.6	132.1	102.2	73.8	1,617.9
Source: Japan Meteorological Agency (1991–2020 normals, extremes 1889–present)

== Demographics ==
Per Japanese census data, the population of Yamagata has remained relatively steady over the past 40 years.

Historical population
Year	Pop.	±%
1960	188,560	—
1970	204,127	+8.3%
1980	237,041	+16.1%
1990	249,487	+5.3%
2000	255,369	+2.4%
2010	254,244	−0.4%
2020	247,590	−2.6%

== History ==
The area of present-day Yamagata was part of Dewa Province. During the Edo period, it was a castle town and the center of Yamagata Domain under the Tokugawa shogunate. The city of Yamagata was founded on April 1, 1889 as the capital of Yamagata Prefecture with the creation of the modern municipalities system. The city attained special city status on April 1, 2001. The city's status is then further elevated into a core city on April 1, 2019.

== Government ==
Yamagata has a mayor-council form of government with a directly elected mayor and a unicameral city legislature of 33 members. The city contributes nine members to the Yamagata Prefectural Assembly. In terms of national politics, the city is part of Yamagata District 1 of the lower house of the Diet of Japan.

== Education ==
- Yamagata has 36 public elementary schools, 15 public middle schools, and 1 public high school operated by the city government and ten public high schools operated by the Yamagata Prefectural Board of Education. There are also four private high schools. The prefecture also operates three special education schools for the handicapped.

=== Universities ===
- Tohoku Bunkyo College
- Tohoku University of Art & Design
- Yamagata Prefectural University of Health Sciences
- Yamagata University, including Kojirakawa Campus (Faculty of Literature & Social Science, the Faculty of Science and the Faculty of Education, Art & Science) and Iida Campus (Faculty of Medicine, School of Nursing and University Hospital).

=== High schools ===
- Kajo-Gakuen H.S.
- Nihon University Yamagata Senior H.S.
- Tōkai University Yamagata Senior H.S.
- Yamagata Central H.S.
- Yamagata Civic Commercial H.S.
- Yamagata East H.S.
- Yamagata-Gakuin H.S.
- Yamagata-Johoku H.S.
- Yamagata-Meisei H.S.
- Yamagata North H.S.
- Yamagata South H.S.
- Yamagata Technical H.S.
- Yamagata West H.S.
- Yamamoto-Gakuen H.S.

== Transportation ==
=== Railway ===
East Japan Railway Company - Yamagata Shinkansen

- Yamagata

East Japan Railway Company - Ōu Main Line(Yamagata Line)

- Zaō - Yamagata - Kita-Yamagata - Uzen-Chitose - Minami-Dewa - Urushiyama]

East Japan Railway Company - Senzan Line

- Omoshiroyama-Kōgen - Yamadera - Takase - Tateyama - Uzen-Chitose - Kita-Yamagata - Yamagata

East Japan Railway Company - - Aterazawa Line

- Yamagata - Kita-Yamagata - Higashi-Kanai

=== Highway ===
- Tōhoku-Chūō Expressway – Yamagata-chūō, Yamagata-Kaminoyama interchanges
- Yamagata Expressway – Yamagata-Zaō, Yamagata-kita, Sekizawa interchanges
- National Route 13
- National Route 48
- National Route 112
- National Route 286
- National Route 348
- National Route 458

== Culture ==
=== Ramen ===
Yamagata is famous in Japan for eating the most ramen on average.

=== Local events ===
- Yamagata Hanagasa Festival (花笠祭り, Hanagasa Matsuri) - one of Tōhoku's major summer festivals, is held in the city every August 5, 6 and 7. Yamagata also hosts the bi-annual Yamagata International Documentary Film Festival. An autumn tradition is Imoni-kai (taro potato party). Taro potatoes, thin-sliced meat, and vegetables are cooked in a large pot at picnic spots. The banks of the Mamigasaki River are popular. Once a year, on the first Sunday in September, the city government serves thousands of bowls from its giant iron pot, which is serviced by a building crane. In 2009, 30,000 servings were prepared and served, and still a crowd waited in line.

=== Local attractions ===
- Yama-dera (Ryushaku-ji) lies within the city limits, 15 minutes by train from the center.
- Kajo Park, located in the city center of town northwest of the train station, is the extensive grounds of castle keep of feudal warlord Mogami Yoshiaki. While most of the park is athletic fields and public function buildings, the rebuilt walls, eastern main gate, and surrounding moat of the former castle are impressive. The Mogami Yoshiaki Historical Museum nearby features items from the Edo period, and information on these exhibits and the history of the castle town. It also contains a small public museum with displays of natural and social history.
- Yamagata Museum of Art.
- Mt. Zao, located just 40 minutes via bus from Yamagata Station is the massive mountain known as Mt. Zao. This is one of Japan's most famous places for skiing and snowboarding and also has many hiking courses to enjoy. There is also an onsen town here with many ryokan and public baths to soak in the water of Mt. Zao.
- Bunshokan, the former prefectural office of Yamagata has now been remade as a museum that shows the history of Yamagata Prefecture and also is completely free for visitors to enter and look around.
- Chitosekan, is one of Yamagata's oldest and most famous ryotei restaurants and was built by the same designer who made the bunshokan office in the center of Yamagata City.
- Hirashimizu is an artisans village located just 15 minutes from the center of Yamagata City and has many pottery shops and craft shops to explore.

== International relations ==
=== Sister cities ===
Yamagata is twinned with:

- Boulder, United States (1994)
- Jilin City, China (1983)
- Kitzbühel, Austria (1963)
- Swan Hill, Australia (1980)
- Ulan-Ude, Russia (1991)

=== Partner cities ===
- Ōshima, Japan (1978)
- Kami, Japan (1989)
- Tainan, Taiwan (2017)

== Notable people ==
- Yoshiharu Abe, musician
- Manami Hosokawa, actress and gravure idol
- Yudai Igarashi, racing driver
- Joji Kato, speed skater
- Yoshitaka Kuroda, racing driver
- Yoshimi Niizeki, professional golfer
- Yuko Oga, basketball player
- Ito Ogawa, writer
- Ken Okuyama, industrial designer
- Shozo Sasahara, wrestler
- Chihiro Suzuki, voice actor
- Miyuki Takahashi, volleyball player
- Iwahiko Tsumanuma, architect
- Eriko Watanabe, actress
