= Hanagasa Ondo =

Hanagasa Ondo (花笠音頭, flower straw-hat song) is a folk song from Yamagata Prefecture, Japan. It accompanies a local community dance called the "Hanagasa Odori (花笠踊り).

The song is in typical swung ondo rhythm, and features a kakegoe found in no other song; "Ha Yassho Makkasho!" The dance is performed with a simple straw hat decorated with synthetic flowers. It is usually performed by women, but men can also join in. The dance movements are different for each gender.

== Excerpt from Hanagasa Ondo ==
Japanese:

Oraga zaisho ni
kite miyashanse
kome no CHOI CHOI! (kakegoe)
naruki ga ojigi suru
Ha Yassho! Makkasho! Shan Shan Shan!

English translation:

Oh come here and see
The heads of rice have matured
And bow low with fruit

(kakegoe)

== In popular culture ==
Hanagasa Ondo plays when the lid of the Gyukakuni ekiben is lifted.
