= Masahito Anzai =

Japanese social scientist and archaeologist

- Born: June 1, 1945; Manchukuo, Haicheng
- Resting place: Japan
- Other name: 安斎 正人
- Occupation: archaeologis

Masahito Anzai (安斎 正人, Anzai Masahito; born 1 June 1945) is a Japanese social scientist and archaeologist, professor at the Tohoku University of Art and Design.

== Biography ==
A graduate of the University of Tokyo in archeology in 1970, he was an assistant at the same university for many years, but in 2008 was appointed professor at the Tohoku University of Art and Design. He has written a number of books and papers particularly on social archaeology and the structure of Paleolithic society. He was an editor of A Study of Regional Chronology in the Palaeolithic in 2006. His more recent work since 2010 has focused on the archaeology of climate change, and the climate change in Nawamon culture.

== Links ==
- CiNii
