= Beauty (2009 film) =

- DVD cover
- Directed by: Toshio Gotō
- Screenplay by: Ryunosuke Ono; Toimi Kikuhara
- Produced by: Toshio Gotō; Shunsuke Yamada
- Starring: Kataoka Takataro; Kataoka Ainosuke VI; Kumiko Aso
- Cinematography: Hiroshi Iwabuchi
- Edited by: Jun Nabeshima
- Music by: Reijiro Koroku
- Release date: March 14, 2009 (Japan)
- Running time: 122 minutes
- Country: Japan
- Language: Japanese

Beauty (Japanese: Beauty うつくしいもの, Hepburn: Beauty: Utsukushii-mono) is a 2009 Japanese drama film directed by Toshio Gotō. The film explores themes of love, beauty, kabuki, and the strength of human spirit. It was entered into the 20th Tokyo International Film Festival, as well as the 31st Moscow International Film Festival.

== Plot ==
Film is set in a small village of Ina district, Nagano Prefecture, Japan, in the 1930s. Hanji, a young boy, sees the performance of a kabuki for the first time as a dedication event in the village. He is fascinated by the performance of Yukio, a character as young as Hanji, who dances as "Tenryu Koishibuki".

He begins to learn the Kabuki with Yukio and Utako, a girl friend, and soon becomes an excellent actor.

One day in 1944, Hanji and Yukio received the draft cards. The tide of the war was against Japan. The village people held the final stage of the Kabuki for the two young men who might never return there again. After war was over, Japan was defeated. Hanji and Yukio survived the war, but they were detained in Siberia by USSR.

A few years after, only Hanji could return to the village and met Utako again. He saw that the village people were utterly dejected by the war. Hanji decided that he would revive the Kabuki and the village.

In the 1980s, Hanji is aware that he is near the end of his life. The village people hold the final performance of Kabuki for Hanji, and he dances "Tenryu Koishibuki" for Yukio.

== Cast ==
- Takataro Kataoka as Hanji Ogura
- Kataoka Ainosuke VI as Yukio Katsuragi
- Kumiko Aso as Utako Higashiura
- Taira Takahashi as Hanji (child)
- Sora Oshima as Yukio (child)
- Masao Kinoshita as Noritoshi Kashima
- Hisashi Igawa as Hanzo Ogura
- Noritoshi Kashima as Masao Kinoshita
- Hidekazu Mashima as Gozaburo Saeki
- Satoshi Nikaido as Fumio Moroto
- Asae Onishi as Hisako Katsuragi
- Makoto Akatsuka as Tsurudayuu Higashiura
- Kazuo Kitamura as Village Chief Inaji
- Kazuyoshi Kushida as Nakamura
