= Tateyama Station (Yamagata) =

Railway station in Yamagata, Yamagata Prefecture, Japan

Tateyama Station 楯山駅
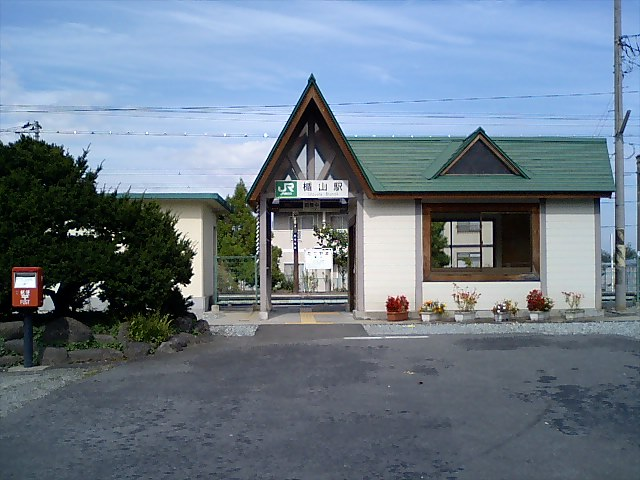
- Tateyama Station in October 2007

General information
- Location: Kazama 6, Yamagata-shi, Yamagata-ken 990-2221; Japan
- Coordinates: 38°18′6″N 140°22′14″E
- Operator: JR East
- Line: ■ Senzan Line
- Distance: 54.9 km from Sendai
- Platforms: 1 side platform

Other information
- Status: Unstaffed

History
- Opened: October 17, 1933

Services
Preceding station	JR East	Following station
Uzen-Chitose towards Yamagata	Senzan Line Rapid B Local	Takase towards Sendai
Location
- Location within Yamagata Prefecture Location within Japan

Tateyama Station (楯山駅, Tateyama-eki) is a railway station in the city of Yamagata, Yamagata Prefecture, Japan, operated by East Japan Railway Company (JR East).

== Lines ==
Tateyama Station is served by the Senzan Line, and is located 54.9 rail kilometers from the terminus of the line at Sendai Station.

== Station layout ==
The station has two opposed side platforms connected by a level crossing. The station is unattended.

=== Platforms ===
1	■ Senzan Line	for Uzen-Chitose and Yamagata
2	■ Senzan Line	for Yamadera and Sendai

== History ==
Tateyama Station opened on October 17, 1933. The station was absorbed into the JR East network upon the privatization of JNR on 1 April 1987. A new station building was completed in 1999.

== Surrounding area ==
- Tateyama Post Office

== See also ==
- List of railway stations in Japan
