= Futakuchi Kyōkoku Prefectural Natural Park =

Natural park of Miyagi prefecture, Japan

- 県立自然公園二口峡谷
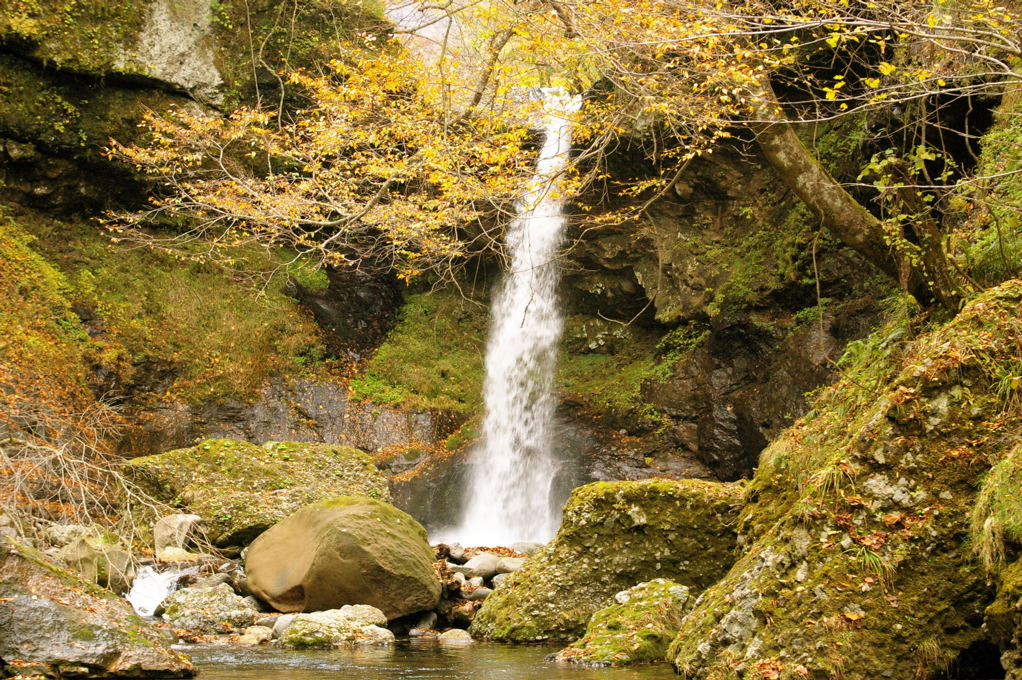
- The Anetaki waterfall
- Interactive map of Futakuchi Kyōkoku Prefectural Natural Park
- Location: Miyagi Prefecture, Japan
- Nearest city: Sendai
- Coordinates: 38°16′42″N 140°31′18″E
- Area: 92.30 km^{2} (35.64 sq mi)
- Established: 1 August 1947

Futakuchi Kyōkoku Prefectural Natural Park (県立自然公園二口峡谷, Kenritsu shizen kōen Futakuchi Kyōkoku) is a Prefectural Natural Park in western Miyagi Prefecture, Japan. First designated for protection in 1947, the park is within the municipality of Sendai. The park centres upon the valley of the Hirose River (広瀬川) and encompasses a number of waterfalls as well as Sakunami Onsen. Wildlife in the park includes the Japanese macaque and Japanese serow.

== See also ==
- National Parks of Japan
