= Yamagata Prefectural University of Health Sciences =

University in Yamagata Prefecture, Japan

Coordinates: 38°17′48.9″N 140°20′46″E

- 山形県立保健医療大学
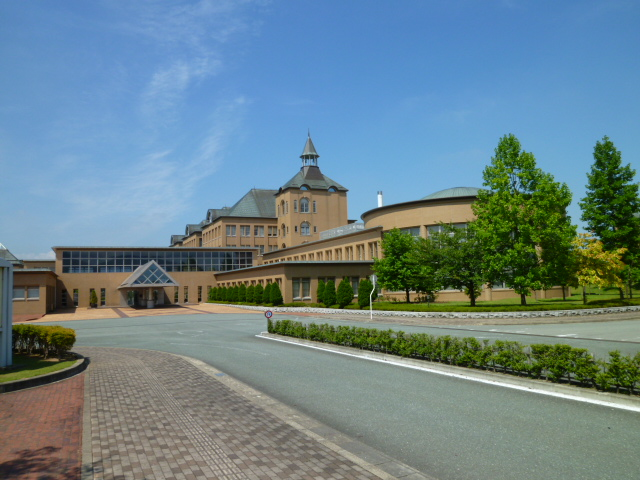
- Type: Public
- Established: 1997 (junior college); 2000 (university)
- Location: Yamagata, Japan

Yamagata Prefectural University of Health Sciences (山形県立保健医療大学, Yamagata kenritsu hoken iryou daigaku) is a public university in Yamagata, Yamagata, Japan. The predecessor of the school was founded in 1997, and it was chartered as a university in 2000.

== Undergraduate program ==
- Health and Medical Faculty
  - Department of Nursing
  - Department of Physical Therapy
  - Department of Occupational Therapy

== Graduate program ==
- Health and Medical Studies (master's program)
  - Nursing
  - Physical Therapy
  - Occupational Therapy
