= 31st Moscow International Film Festival =

Film festival

- Location: Moscow, Russia
- Founded: 1959
- Awards: Grand Prix
- Festival date: 19–28 June 2009
- Website: Website

The 31st Moscow International Film Festival was held from 19 to 28 June 2009. The Golden George was awarded to the Russian film Pete on the Way to Heaven directed by Nikolai Dostal.

== Jury ==
- Pavel Lungin (Russia – President of the Jury)
- Shyam Benegal (India)
- Nick Powell (United Kingdom)
- Sergey Trimbach (Ukraine)
- Gulnara Dusmatova (Kazakhstan)

== Films in competition ==
The following films were selected for the main competition:

English title	Original title	Director(s)	Production country
Bibi	Bibi	Hassan Yektapanah	Iran
Beauty	Beauty utusukushiimono	Toshio Gotō	Japan
The Miracle	Chudo	Aleksandr Proshkin	Russia
Five Days Without Nora	Cinco días sin Nora	Mariana Chenillo	Mexico
As God Commands	Come Dio сomanda	Gabriele Salvatores	Italy
Happy New Year	Happy New Year	Christoph Schaub	Switzerland
Today and the Other Days	Jeo nuk ui game	Wee An Choi	South Korea
Little Moscow	Mała Moskwa	Waldemar Krzystek	Poland
Mediator	Mediatori	Dito Tsintsadze	Georgia, Germany
Melody for a Barrel Organ	Melodiya dlya sharmanki	Kira Muratova	Ukraine
Burning Mooki	Mooki bo'era	Lina Chaplin, Slava Chaplin	Israel
Ward No. 6	Palata No. 6	Karen Shakhnazarov	Russia
Pete on the Way to Heaven	Petia po doroge v tsarstvie nebesnoye	Nikolai Dostal	Russia
Crayfish	Raci	Ivan Tscherkelov	Bulgaria
The Missing Person	The Missing Person	Noah Buschel	United States
Prank	Tréfa	Péter Gárdos	Hungary
