= Matagi dialect =

Japanese dialect

- マタギ
- Native to: Japan
- Region: Akita, Aomori
- Extinct: 2021
- Language family: Japonic: Japanese; Eastern Japanese; Tōhoku; Matagi dialect

Language codes
- ISO 639-3: –

The Matagi dialect (マタギ言葉, Matagi kotoba) is a functionally extinct Japanese sociolect spoken by the Matagi people of Akita Prefecture and other areas of the Tohoku region in northern Honshu, Japan. The Matagi dialect is sometimes called Yama-kotoba (山言葉; lit. 'mountain words').

Matagi contains various unique words relating to hunting, tools, and rituals, many of which are of Ainu origin.

A dictionary of Matagi was published by Yoshizo Itabashi (板橋義三) in 2008.

== Vocabulary ==
Below are some examples of unique Matagi words. Words such as wakka 'water', seta 'dog', and sanpe 'heart' are of Ainu origin.

English gloss	Japanese gloss	Matagi (hiragana)	Matagi (romanized)
water; liquor	水・酒	わっか	wakka
gun; rifle	鉄砲・銃	するべ	surube
bear	熊	いたず	itazu
bear	熊	なびれ	nabire
dog	犬	せた	seta
dog	犬	へだ	heda
wolf	狼	おきゃく	okyaku
Japanese macaque	猿	すね	sune
Japanese serow	カモシカ	あおけら	aokera
Japanese serow	カモシカ	こしまけ	koshimake
cattle	牛	つのから	tsunokara
rice (uncooked)	米	くさのみ	kusanomi
Buddhist temple	寺	くし	kushi
heart	心臓	さんぺ	sanpe
non-Matagi person	マタギでない人	せたぎ	setagi

Yoshizo Itabashi (板橋義三) (2019) notes that many Ainu words in Matagi have undergone semantic shifts:

Matagi	Meaning in Matagi	Ainu	Meaning in Ainu
kado	weather (天候)	kanto	heaven, sky (天、空)
magiri	small knife, spear (小刀、槍)	makiri	small knife (小刀)
bakke	bear head (熊の頭)	pake	human or animal head (人の頭、動物の頭)
hira	net for catching bears (ケン網という熊を捕まえる網)	sirar	cliff (崖)
hono	medium-sized serow (中型のカモシカ)	pon	small (小さい)
horo	a lot (たくさん)	poro	big (大きい)
sa(n)pe	heart, gall of bear or serow (熊やカモシカの心臓、胆)	sampe	heart (心臓)
heda, seda, seta	dog (犬)	seta	dog (犬)
wa(n)ba, washi	avalanche (雪崩)	upas	snow (雪)
wakka	water (水), liquor (酒) (as part of compounds)	wakka	water (水)

== See also ==
- Akita dialect
- Tsugaru dialect
- Matagi
- Emishi
- Kyōsuke Kindaichi
