= Matagi =

Traditional winter hunters in Japan

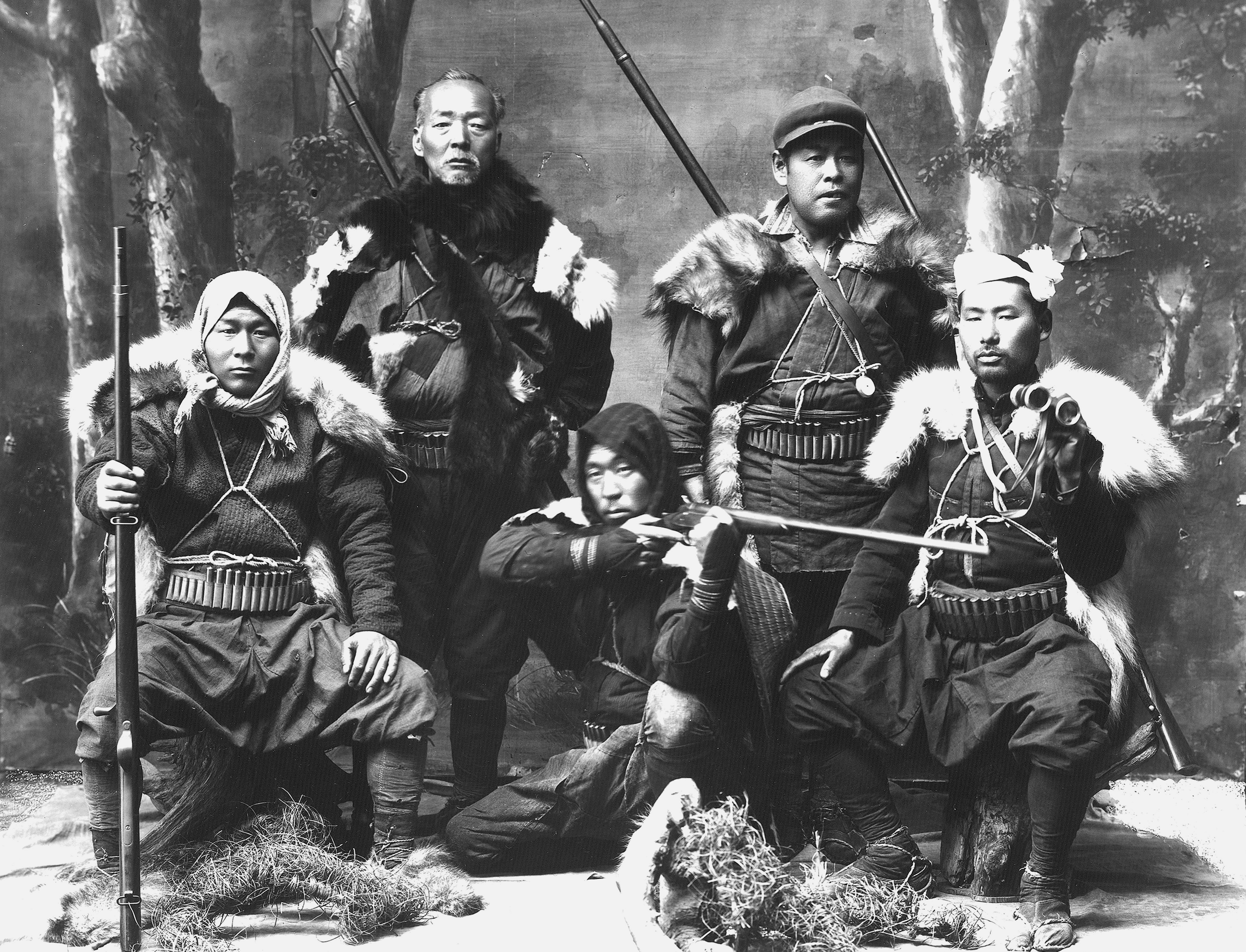
A group of matagi in traditional costume, 1917

The Matagi (マタギ; or less often 又鬼) are traditional winter hunters of the Tōhoku region of northern Japan, most famously today in the Ani area in Akita Prefecture, which is known for the Akita dogs. Afterwards, they spread to the Shirakami-Sanchi forest between Akita and Aomori, and other areas of Japan. Documented as a specialised group from the medieval period onwards, the Matagi continue to hunt deer and bear in the present day, and their culture has much in common with the bear worship of the Ainu people.

With the introduction of modern firearms in the 19th century, and mass-production of reloadable cartridges beginning with the Murata rifle, the need for group hunting for bear has diminished, leading to a decline in Matagi culture.

Matagi hamlets are found in the districts of Nishitsugaru and Nakatsugaru (Aomori Prefecture), Kitaakita and Senboku (Akita Prefecture), Waga (Iwate Prefecture), Nishiokitama and Tsuruoka (Yamagata Prefecture), Murakami and Nakauonuma (Niigata Prefecture and Nagano Prefecture). Well-known Matagi villages frequented by tourists can be found in Ani on the western slopes of Mount Moriyoshi in Akita Prefecture, and a few hamlets on the eastern slopes of Mount Chōkai in Akita and Yamagata prefectures.

== Etymology and language ==
There are multiple theories on the origins of the word Matagi. One notable theory is that it is derived from the Tōhoku word yamadachi (山立, "hunter"). It is also hypothesised that the word "matagi" originates in the Ainu language, from matangi or matangitono, meaning "man of winter" or "hunter". (Note: Formed from the component words 'mata', "winter," with connotations of "men's work" or "hunting," and 'tono', "sir, leader." However, note that tono is in fact a loanword from the Japanese language.) The latter theory is also supported by the existence of specialised hunting vocabulary in the Matagi dialect which contains a number of Ainu language words.

== Ethnic origin ==
According to Lee and Hasegawa, the Matagi are the historical descendants of Ainu-speaking hunters and fishermen who migrated down from Hokkaido into parts of Honshu. They also contributed several Ainu-derived toponyms and loanwords, related to geography and certain forest and water animals which they hunted, to Japonic-speaking people.

== Hunting practices ==
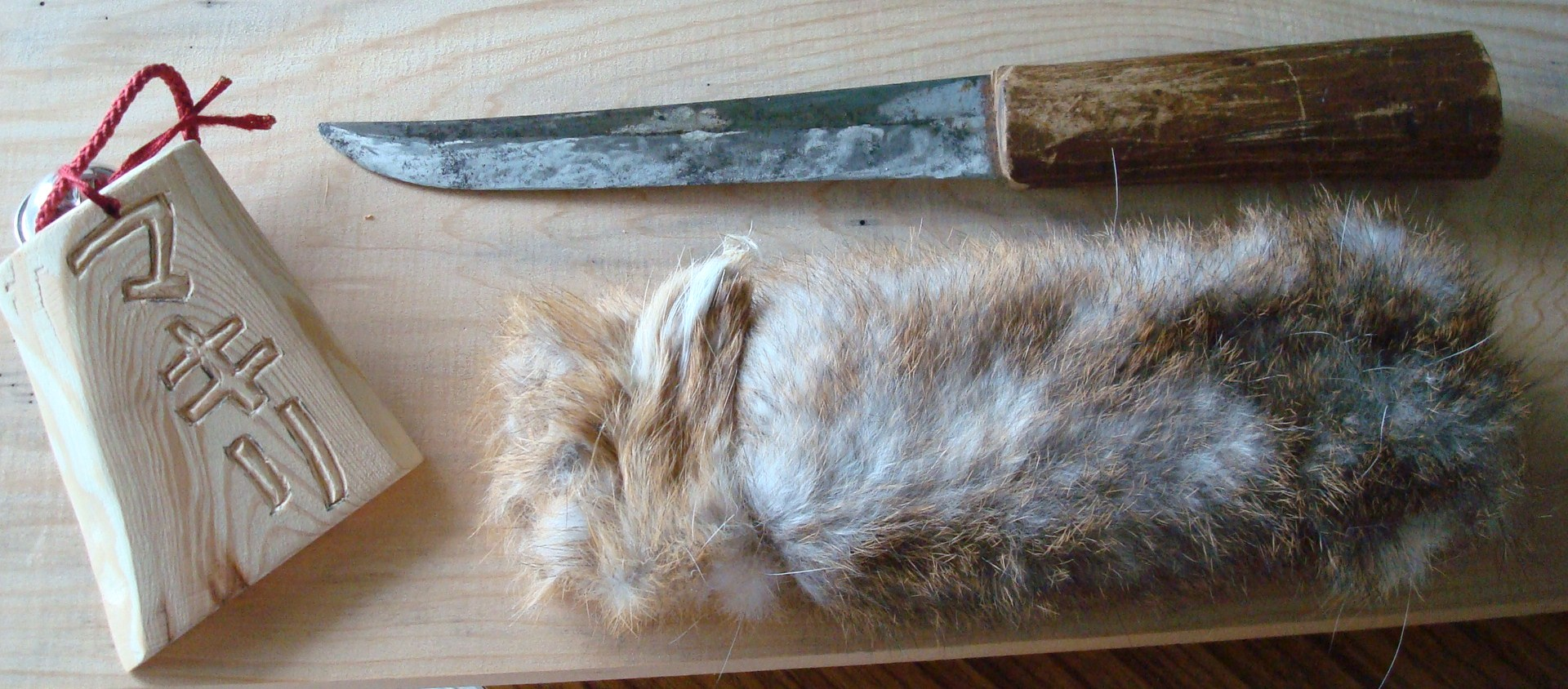
Makiri a traditional Matagi hunting knife

=== Spirituality ===
The Matagi have a unique culture that centers around their belief in mountain gods and distinct law. For them, hunting is a way of life, and not a form of sport. The animals hunted are perceived as gifts from the mountain gods, and the Matagi have a certain way to butcher and prepare the animal. After the animal is killed, it is praised, and the spirit comforted. Then, to recompense for the loss of life, everything, from the fur to the internal organs, is used. Emphasis is put on the act of taking an animal's life through ceremony and reflection, which is then passed along to future generations of Matagi.

Through history mainstream Japanese society viewed the Matagi as outside of ritually clean society due to eating many animals thought to be ritually polluting. In makimono scrolls held by many Matagi families they record stories of the ancestor of the Matagi being given special permission to hunt and eat these animals due to the ancestor rendering special service to the mountain goddess Yamanokami in a time of distress.

=== Present-day Matagi ===
The Matagi live in small hamlets of the mountain beech forests of Tōhoku and engage in agriculture during the planting and harvest season. In the winter and early spring, they form hunting bands that spend weeks at a time in the forest.

In the modern day, some Matagi have come into conflict with environmental activists, due to concerns over deforestation and the depletion of certain animal species. The Matagi no longer hunt the Japanese serow, which is protected, but continue to hunt bear by special license.

== Literary references ==
Matagi are referenced and described in the biographical novel Dog Man: An Uncommon Life on a Faraway Mountain by Martha Sherrill, alongside descriptions of a real modern day Matagi named Uesugi, who was a friend of the main characters who helped preserve the Akita breed of dog, which they used extensively for hunting.

Matagi figure as primary characters in the novel, The Girl with the Face of the Moon by Ellis Amdur. In the manga series Golden Kamuy a Matagi hunter named Tanigaki Genjirou is prominently featured, as well as Ainu culture in general. My Deer Friend Nokotan also features a Matagi character named Souichirou Kumatori who attempts to hunt the main character, a deer, for a procession of a local festival in his hometown in Hokkaido.

The main character, Hitomi, of the comic book series with the same name by HS Take and Isabella Mazantini is said to be a Matagi.

== See also ==
- Banji Banzaburō
- Sanka (ethnic group)
- Matagi (1982)
