= Ōe =

Ōe may refer to:

- Ōe (surname), a Japanese surname (including a list of people)
- Ōe, Yamagata, a place in Japan
- Ōe, Kyoto, a place in Japan

== See also ==
- Oe
- Ō
