= Oe =

Oe or OE may refer to:

== Arts and entertainment ==
- Okean Elzy, a Ukrainian rock band

== Language ==
- Old English, the English language spoken in the Early Middle Ages
- Œ or œ, a ligature of o and e used in the modern French and medieval Latin alphabets
- Oe (digraph)
- Open front rounded vowel (ɶ)
- Open-mid front rounded vowel (œ)
- Ö, a character sometimes representing 'oe', appearing in some Germanic, Turkic, and Uralic languages
- Ø, a Northern European (Danish, Faroese, Norwegian) or Sami vowel, representing œ, 'oe' diphthong
- Ө, a letter in the Cyrillic alphabet

== People ==
- Ōe (surname), a Japanese surname (including a list of people)
- Old Edwardian (OE), a former pupil of various schools named after a King Edward or St. Edward
- Old Etonian (OE), a former pupil of Eton College, England

== Places ==
- Oe (Attica), ancient Greece
- Oe, Estonia
- Ōe, Yamagata, Japan
- Ōe, Kyoto, Japan
- Oe District, Tokushima, Japan
- Olathe East High School, Kansas, United States

== Science and technology ==
- Cessna OE Bird Dog, a US Marine Corps observation aircraft later redesignated O-1 along with the similar US Army L-19
- °Oe, a measurement on the Oechsle scale for the density of grape must
- Oersted (Oe), a unit of magnetic field strength
- On30 (Oe), a model railway gauge
- OpenEmbedded (OE), a Linux-based embedded build system
- Opportunistic encryption (OE), a means to combat passive wiretapping
- Outlook Express, a former email program of Microsoft
- Ophryocystis elektroscirrha, a parasite of monarch and queen butterflies

== Trade bodies ==
- International Union of Operating Engineers, a North America
- Ordem dos Engenheiros, Portugal

== Transport ==
- Odakyū Enoshima Line
- Orient Express, a steam locomotive and an express
- OE, the aircraft registration prefix for Austrian aircraft
- Lauda (airline) (IATA:OE), a defunct Ryanair subsidiary

== Other uses ==
- Order of Excellence of Guyana
- Overseas experience (OE), a New Zealand term for extended working holidays
- Overview effect, the cognitive shift experienced by astronauts when viewing Earth from space

== See also ==
- 0e (disambiguation), listing uses with the number nought
- OES (disambiguation)
