= On2 gauge =

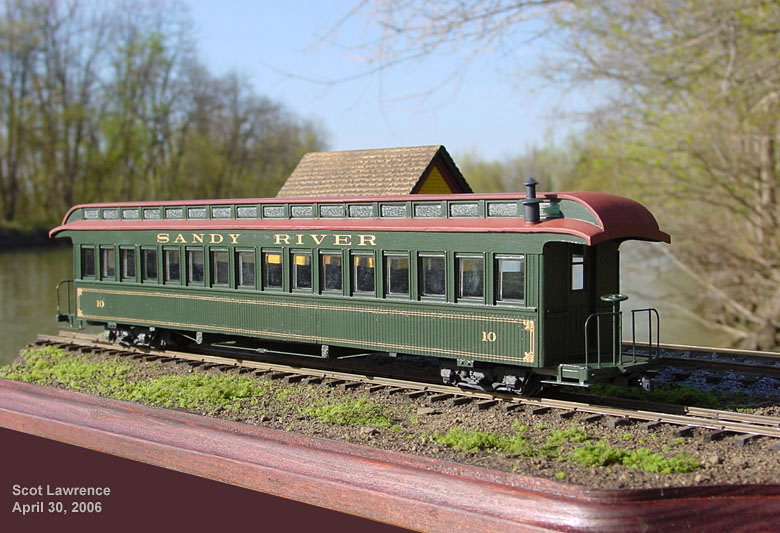
- On2 scale model of a SR&RL Coach, kitbashed from two Bachmann On30 coaches.
- Scale: 6.35 mm to 1 foot
- Scale ratio: 1:48
- Model gauge: 12.7 mm (0.5 in)
- Prototype gauge: 2 ft (610 mm)

On2 gauge is part of the hobby of rail transport modeling. The name is based on the common USA model railroad O scale ('oh' scale) of 1:48 and refers to the gauge between the rails (2 ft (610 mm) ) and the fact that it is narrow gauge, thus 'On2'.

== History ==
Prototype 2-foot gauge railroads existed, and still exist, all over the world. The prototype railroads being modeled in On2 scale include:

- The Maine 2-foot railroads. A series of 2 ft gauge railroads that existed in the state of Maine, USA from the 1870s to the 1940s.
- 2-foot gauge railways of Wales and England, including the Ffestiniog Railway.
- 2-foot gauge railways of South Africa.
- 2-foot gauge Gilpin Tramway of Colorado, a 2 ft gauge mining railroad that used Shay locomotives.
- 2-foot gauge industrial railroads found all over the world including extensive systems still serving the sugar cane industry in the 21st century in Queensland, Australia.

(need early history of On2 scale modeling)

A pioneer modeler in On2 was Allan Hanson. He was one of the first (if not the first) modelers to have a fully functioning On2 layout. He was a prolific builder, and though his models were not built to the level of detail seen today, they were more than acceptable for the time. He was also the first modeler to produce a diorama in the early 1960s built to exact HOn2 scale. This diorama later went on to win an award at the annual NMRA show.

For most of its history, On2 scale modeling involved mostly scratch-building of locomotive and rolling stock, and hand-laying track. On2 scale locomotives were obtained by either scratch-building, adapting chassis from other scales, or buying ready to run On2 locomotives, which were available in brass only.

In 2007, Bachmann gave a major "shot in the arm" to Maine On2 scale modeling when they introduced their On30 scale Forney locomotive (now discontinued), which is based on a Baldwin catalog design very close to actual locomotives used by Maine 2-foot gauge prototype railroads. These forney locomotives, although available in On30 scale only, have created an increase in Maine 2-footer modeling, and an increase in On2 scale modeling. On30 locomotives and rolling stock must be regauged to operate in On2 scale.

This is often a difficult proposition. Many modelers choose to simply keep them in On30 scale for ease of use, modeling 2 ft gauge railroads in On30 scale, but this results in the wrong gauge for correct 2-footer modeling.

== Controls ==
Control of On2 scale layouts is the same as other scales, including HO scale, N scale, etc. Electricity is through the rails, using either standard DC control, or DCC.

== Curved track ==
For industrial modeling or "critter" modeling, tight curves are possible. But for Maine 2-footer modeling, curves need to be quite generous. The minimum practical radius is generally said to be 42 in (1 m)

== Availability of models and supplies ==
In the early years of On2, Bob Werner's Portland Products was the major supplier of castings and the various small parts needed to model the Maine two footers. Peter Barney had his Sandy River Car Shops line of kits, which were essentially boxes of stripwood with meager instructions. The drawings were often not to scale, but there was little else available at the time. Later, Grandt Line produced some excellent styrene and brass parts that provided useful to scratchbuilders. NJ International, Coronado Scale Models, Gary Kohler, and others all brought out limited run kits or detail parts over the years of varied quality, only to have them fade from existence due to lack of sales. Portland Products exists in name only at this time, the victim of bad blood within the On2 fraternity. Sandy River Car Shops kits are still available from Peter Barney's friends at Cranberry Junction hobbies, but they are very dated in their design and materials.

In the mid-1990s there was a major growth spurt brought on by the introduction of a line of kits by Chris Cardinal. He was the first to apply the then-new technologies of laser cutting and resin casting exclusively to two-foot prototypes. He raised the bar in regards to the level of detail to be expected in such an obscure scale. His models are still highly sought almost a decade after production stopped. The line of kits was eventually bought out by Darryl Sleszinski after Chris' interests shifted, but it never enjoyed the same level of success seen in the beginning.

The year 2007 saw a major shift in On2 scale, especially Maine On2 modeling, with the release of the Bachmann forney. Before then, ready-to-run locomotives were only available in brass, and rolling stock kits were few. Since 2007, there has been an upswing in kits, structures, detail parts, and rolling stock, which will likely continue. See the list of Manufacturers below.

== Advantages compared to other scales ==
The difference of On2 scale, compared to its nearest alternative (On30), is that On2 scale equates to the correct track gauge for 2 ft prototypes - such as Maine "Two Footers" and the many industrial operations that used or continue to use this gauge - including existing 21st century sugar cane operations in Australia, Fiji, Indonesia.

On2 has the advantage over HOn3 or HOn2 in that it is large enough to operate reliably and it is possible to add a significant level of detail to locomotives, rolling stock, buildings and scenery. DCC accessory control and sound are also more easily implemented in O scale in both narrow gauge and standard gauge than in the smaller scales.

A comprehensive narrow gauge On2 scale layout can be accomplished in the same amount of room as a standard gauge HO scale layout because 2 ft gauge prototypes are much smaller than their standard gauge equivalents - a South African 2 ft gauge NG G16 Garratt (2-6-2+2-6-2) is only 48' long whilst an Australian standard gauge NSWGR AD60 Class Garratt (4-8-4+4-8-4) is 108'.

Whilst the scale of structures can be considered the same in an O Scale layout regardless of track gauge (ignoring forced scale for purposes of perspective), On3 (3 ft (914 mm)), On30 (2 ft 6 in (762 mm)) or On2 (2 ft) prototype modelling permits a greater level of model detail and more appropriate scale operation of narrow gauge railway (railroad) prototypes.

An example of structure difference is that servicing facilities for 2 ft locomotives were minimal compared to those for standard gauge equivalents - a narrow gauge two track locomotive shed will occupy much less space on a model layout than a standard gauge roundhouse or running shed. 2 ft narrow gauge operations were generally operated outside of the heavy industrial centres and surrounding buildings often (but not always) tended to be of a smaller scale than those serviced by standard gauge lines.

== See also ==
- O14 - The UK equivalent of On2 which models 2 ft in 7 mm scale (1:43.5) on 14 mm (0.551 in) gauge track
- Rail transport modelling scales
- Model railway scales
