= Asahi, Yamagata (Nishimurayama) =

Asahi 朝日町
- Town
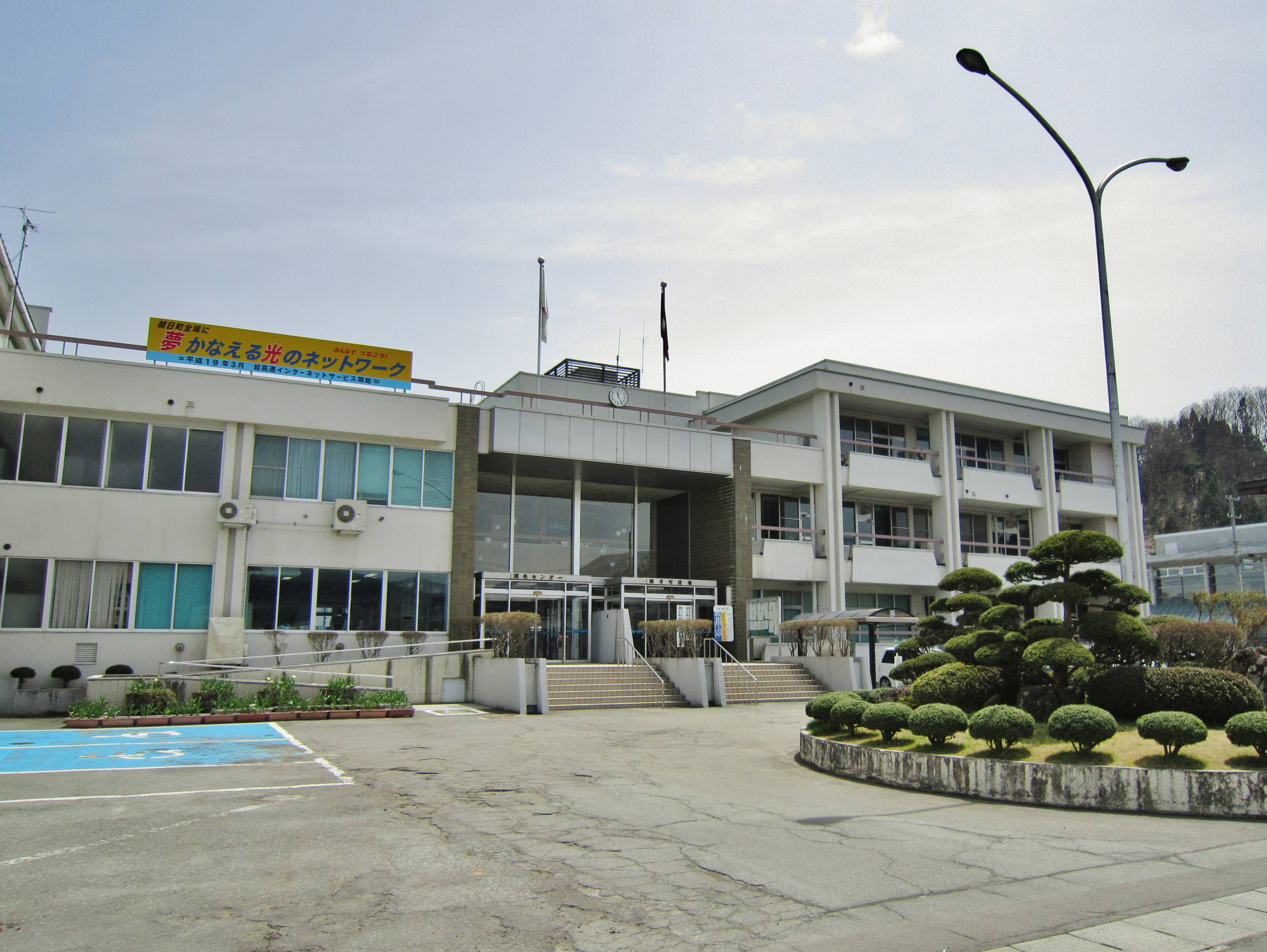
- Asahi Town Hall

- Flag Seal
- Interactive map of Asahi
- Coordinates: 38°18′N 140°09′E
- Country: Japan
- Region: Tōhoku
- Prefecture: Yamagata
- District: Nishimurayama

Area
  - Total: 196.73 km^{2} (75.96 sq mi)

Population (April 2019)
  - Total: 7,020
  - Density: 35.7/km^{2} (92.4/sq mi)
- Time zone: UTC+9 (Japan Standard Time)
- Symbols
  - Tree: Siebold’s beech
  - Flower: Lilium rubellum
  - Bird: Varied tit
  - Animal: Japanese serow
- Phone number: 0237-67-2111
- Address: 1115 Miyajuku, Asahi-machi, Nishimurayama-gun, Yamagata-ken 990-1442
- Website: Official website

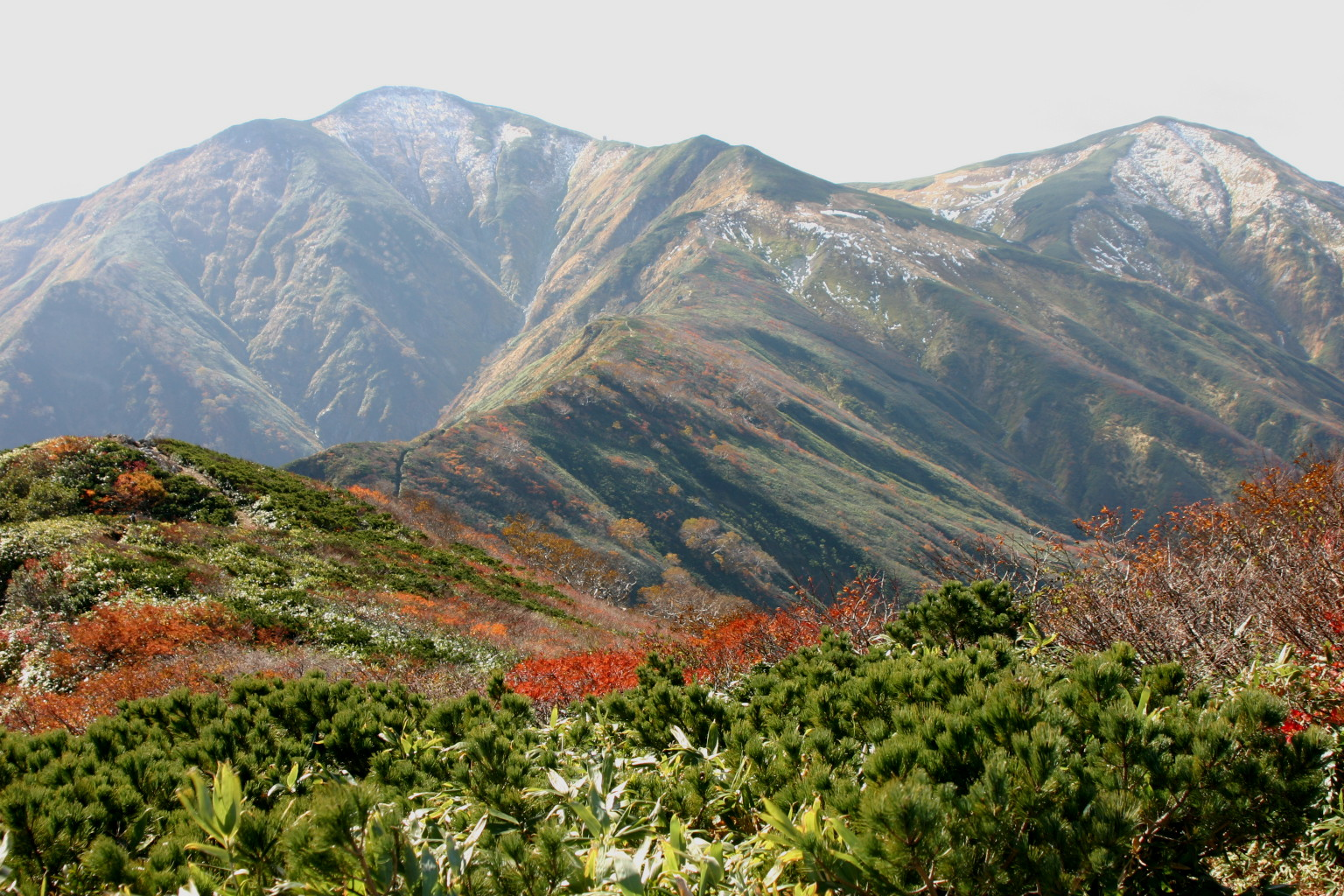
Mount Asahi

Asahi (朝日町, Asahi-machi) is a town located in Yamagata Prefecture, Japan. As of 1 October 2020, the town had an estimated population of 6,366 and a population density of 32,35 persons per km^{2}. The total area of the town is 196.73 square kilometres (76 sq mi).

== Geography ==
Asahi is located in mountainous central Yamagata, and contains Mount Asahi within its borders. The Mogami River forms the western border of the town.

=== Neighboring municipalities ===
- Yamagata Prefecture
  - Nagai
  - Nishikawa
  - Ōe
  - Oguni
  - Shirataka
  - Yamanobe

=== Climate ===
Asahi has a humid continental climate (Köppen climate classification Dfa) with large seasonal temperature differences, with warm to hot (and often humid) summers and cold (sometimes severely cold) winters. Precipitation is significant throughout the year, but is heaviest from August to October. The average annual temperature in Asahi is 8.9 °C. The average annual rainfall is 1715 mm with September as the wettest month. The temperatures are highest on average in August, at around 22.7 °C, and lowest in January, at around −3.7 °C.

== Demographics ==
Per Japanese census data, the population of Asahi has declined over the past 60 years.

Historical population
| Year | Pop. | ±% |
|---|---|---|
| 1960 | 15,594 | — |
| 1970 | 12,501 | −19.8% |
| 1980 | 11,109 | −11.1% |
| 1990 | 10,417 | −6.2% |
| 2000 | 9,337 | −10.4% |
| 2010 | 7,856 | −15.9% |
| 2020 | 6,366 | −19.0% |

== History ==
The area of present-day Asahi was part of ancient Dewa Province. After the start of the Meiji period, the area became part of Nishimurayama District, Yamagata Prefecture. The town of Asahi was established on November 1, 1954, by the merger of the town of Miyajuku with the villages of Oya, and Nishiimogawa.

== Economy ==
The economy of Asahi is based on agriculture.

== Education ==
Asahi has three public elementary schools and one public middle school operated by the town government. The town does not have a high school.

== Transportation ==
=== Railway ===
Asahi does not have any passenger railway service. The nearest station is Aterazawa Station in the neighboring town of Ōe.

=== Highway ===
- National Route 287

== Local attractions ==
- Mount Asahi
