= O14 =

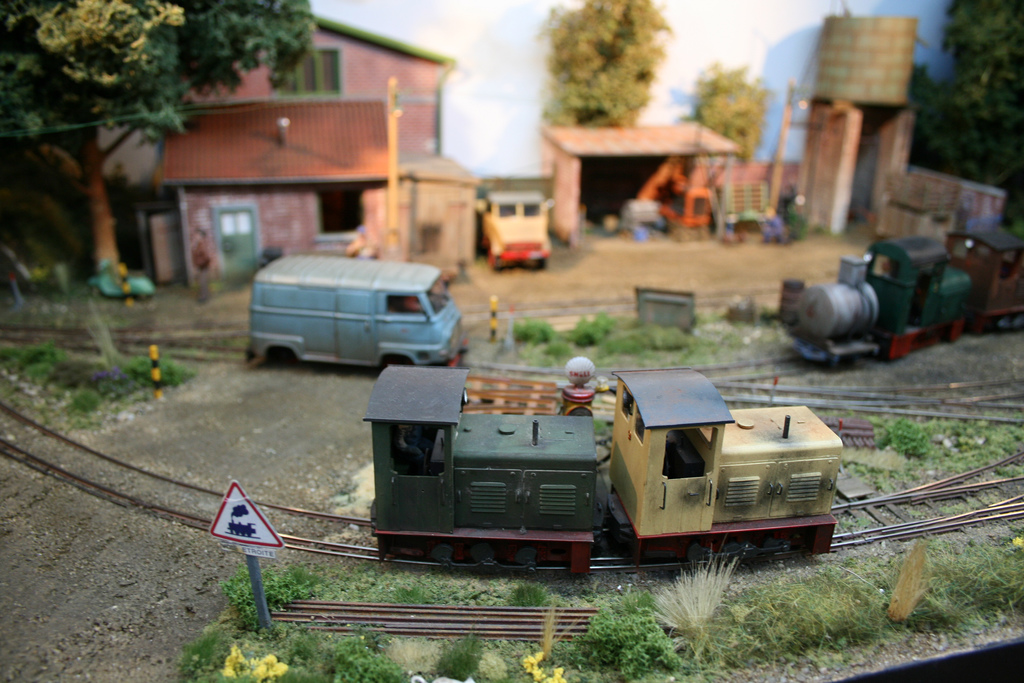
- A scene from 0-14 layout Le Petit Depot by Escadrille St Michel
- Scale: 7 mm to 1 ft
- Scale ratio: 1:43.5
- Model gauge: 14 mm (0.551 in)
- Prototype gauge: 2 ft (610 mm)

O14 is a set of model railway standards for accurately modelling 2 ft (610 mm) narrow-gauge railways in 1:43.5 (7 mm scale) using 14 mm (0.551 in) gauge track.

The first published O14 standards appeared in Model Railway Constructor magazine, September 1951. The article was titled "A Narrow Gauge Layout" and was by Douglas Clayton. He advocated HO standards, less 2.5mm coupled with coarse scale OO wheelsets set to 12.5 mm back to back. A subsequent article in 1953 provided details of his layout. Very little more happened regards the development of O14 until Roy C Link published a new set of standards (1993 — revised 1994) in his magazine Narrow Gauge and Industrial Railway Modelling Review. They were developed for his range of O14 kits — now produced by David Janes under the name KBscale. They are based on the proven 4 mm scale EM standards (BRMSB) and are reasonably close to exact scale especially considering the variations to be found in prototype nominal 2 ft (610 mm) gauge railways.

This scale/gauge combination is managed by the O14 Group (an informal web based society dedicated to finescale 7mm narrow gauge modelling) and supported by the 7mm Narrow Gauge Association.

== Related scales ==
O gauge is used for modelling standard-gauge railways in 7 mm scale, with ScaleSeven the accurate scale and complementary set of standards to O14. Other 7 mm scale narrow-gauge model railway gauges include: O16.5, On30 and O21.

== See also ==
- On2 scale – the USA equivalent of O14 which models 2 ft (610 mm) in 1:48 scale on 1/2" gauge track
- Model railway scales
- List of rail transport modelling scale standards
