= E0 =

E0 or E00 can refer to:

- ε_{0}, in mathematics, the smallest member of the epsilon numbers, a type of ordinal number
- ε_{0}, in physics, vacuum permittivity, the absolute dielectric permittivity of classical vacuum
- E0 (cipher), a cipher used in the Bluetooth protocol
- E0 (robot), a 1986 humanoid robot by Honda
- E^{⊖}, in electrochemistry, the standard electrode potential, measuring individual potential of a reversible electrode at standard state
- E0, the digital carrier for audio, specified in G.703
- E0, Eos Airlines IATA code
- E0, ethanol-free gasoline, see REC-90
- e_{0}, in demographics, the life expectancy of an individual at birth (age zero)
- E00, Cretinism ICD-10 code
- E00, ECO code for certain variations of the Queen's Pawn Game chess opening
- Enemy Zero, a 1996 Japanese horror video game for the Sega Saturn

== See also ==
- 0E (disambiguation)
- EO (disambiguation)
