= 0E =

0E (zero E) or 0-E may refer to:

- 0E, or zero East, longitude for the Prime Meridian
- 0e, or On30 European notation for 0 scale using 16.5mm track
- 0 emission, or Zero emission
  - Zero Emissions Research and Initiatives
  - Zero-emissions vehicle
- 0 energy or Zero energy:
  - Zero energy building (ZEB), a building's use with zero net energy consumption and zero carbon emissions
  - Zero-energy Universe, a concept that the Universe's total amount of energy is exactly zero
- 0 element, or Zero element, one of several generalizations of the number zero to other algebraic structures

== See also ==
- OE (disambiguation)
- E0 (disambiguation)
