= 7 mm =

7 mm or 7mm may refer to:

- 7 mm caliber, firearm cartridges
- 7 mm scale, a model railway scale of 1:43.5
- Seven mountain mandate, a religio-political belief system
