= Nishikawa, Yamagata =

Nishikawa 西川町
- Town
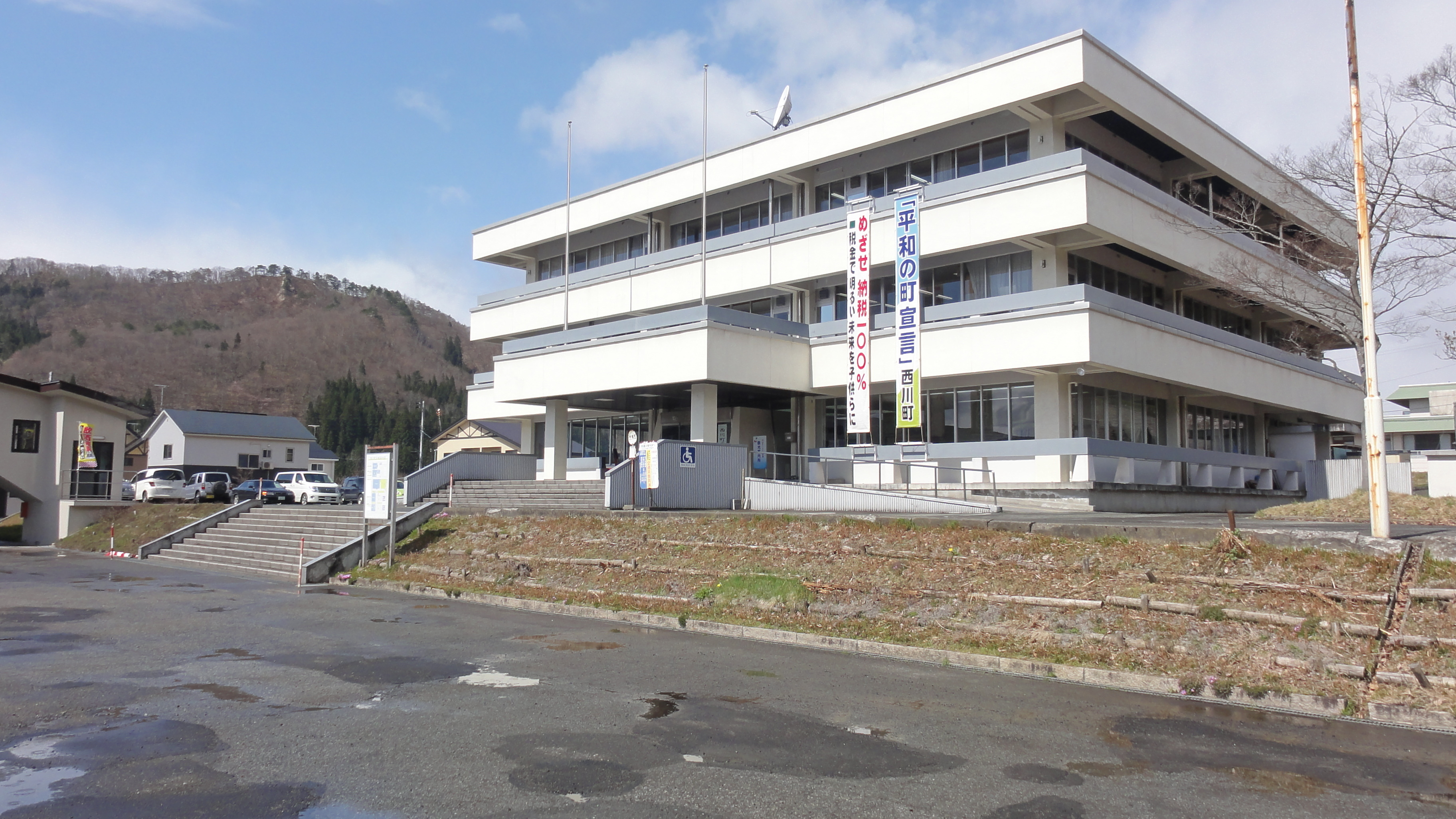
- Nishikawa Town Hall

- Flag Seal

- Location of Nishikawa in Yamagata Prefecture

- Coordinates: 38°25′35.4″N 140°08′51.4″E
- Country: Japan
- Region: Tōhoku
- Prefecture: Yamagata
- District: Nishimurayama

Area
  - Total: 393.19 km^{2} (151.81 sq mi)

Population (February 2020)
  - Total: 5,225
  - Density: 13.29/km^{2} (34.42/sq mi)
- Time zone: UTC+9 (Japan Standard Time)
- Tree: Siebold’s Beech
- Flower: Lysichiton camtschatcensis Chrysanthemum
- Animal: Japanese serow
- Phone number: 0237-74-2111
- Address: 510 Kaishō, Nishikawa-machi, Nishimurayama-gun, Yamagata-ken 990-0792
- Climate: Dfb
- Website: Official website

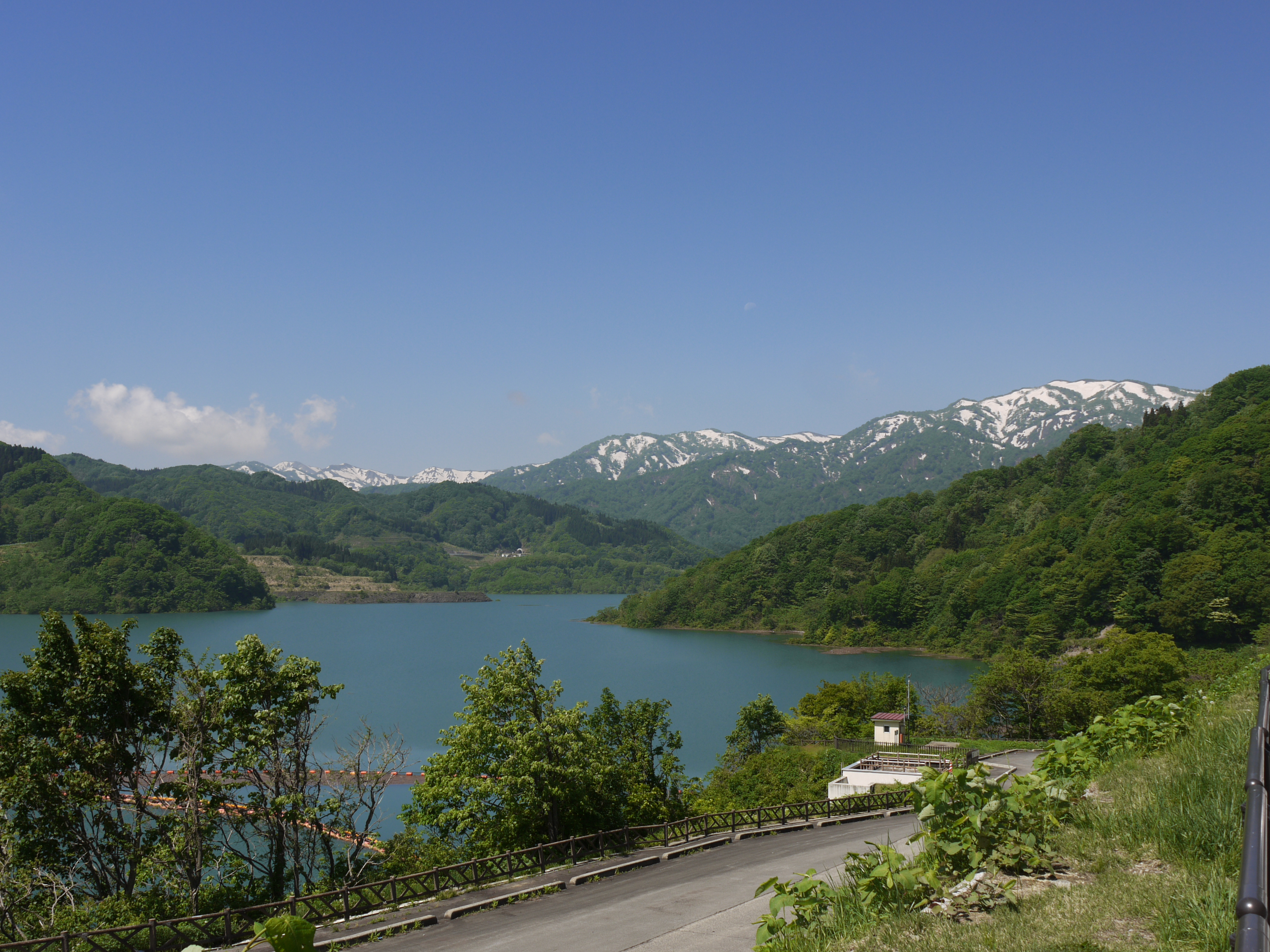
Sagae Dam Reservoir

Nishikawa (西川町, Nishikawa-machi) is a town located in Yamagata Prefecture, Japan. As of 1 February 2020, the town had an estimated population of 5,225 in 1851 households, and a population density of 145.1 persons per km^{2}. The total area of the town is 393.19 square kilometres (152 sq mi).

== Geography ==
Nishikawa is located in mountainous central Yamagata and includes Mount Gassan and Mount Asahi within its borders. The Sagae River passes through the town. Part of the town is within the borders of the Bandai-Asahi National Park.

=== Neighboring municipalities ===
- Niigata Prefecture
  - Murakami
- Yamagata Prefecture
  - Asahi
  - Ōe
  - Oguni
  - Ōkura
  - Sagae
  - Shōnai
  - Tsuruoka

=== Climate ===
Nishikawa has a humid continental climate (Köppen climate classification Dfb) with large seasonal temperature differences, with warm to hot (and often humid) summers and cold (sometimes severely cold) winters. Precipitation is significant throughout the year, but is heaviest from August to October. The average annual temperature in Nishikawa is 8.9 °C (48.0 °F). The average annual rainfall is 2,719.0 mm (107.05 in) with December as the wettest month. The temperatures are highest on average in August, at around 21.8 °C (71.2 °F), and lowest in January, at around −2.3 °C (27.9 °F).

Climate data for Ōisawa, Nishikawa, elevation 440 m (1,440 ft), (1991−2020 normals, extremes 1978−present)
Month	Jan	Feb	Mar	Apr	May	Jun	Jul	Aug	Sep	Oct	Nov	Dec	Year
Record high °C (°F)	12.7 (54.9)	15.7 (60.3)	19.2 (66.6)	27.0 (80.6)	31.5 (88.7)	32.6 (90.7)	34.9 (94.8)	35.0 (95.0)	33.4 (92.1)	28.7 (83.7)	21.4 (70.5)	16.0 (60.8)	35.0 (95.0)
Mean daily maximum °C (°F)	1.0 (33.8)	1.8 (35.2)	5.3 (41.5)	11.8 (53.2)	19.5 (67.1)	23.2 (73.8)	26.3 (79.3)	27.7 (81.9)	23.1 (73.6)	17.0 (62.6)	10.5 (50.9)	3.7 (38.7)	14.2 (57.6)
Daily mean °C (°F)	−2.3 (27.9)	−2.1 (28.2)	0.6 (33.1)	5.2 (41.4)	12.1 (53.8)	16.9 (62.4)	20.9 (69.6)	21.8 (71.2)	17.5 (63.5)	11.0 (51.8)	5.1 (41.2)	0.1 (32.2)	8.9 (48.0)
Mean daily minimum °C (°F)	−5.7 (21.7)	−6.3 (20.7)	−3.8 (25.2)	−0.4 (31.3)	5.1 (41.2)	11.0 (51.8)	16.3 (61.3)	17.1 (62.8)	12.9 (55.2)	6.0 (42.8)	0.6 (33.1)	−3.1 (26.4)	4.1 (39.5)
Record low °C (°F)	−18.9 (−2.0)	−18.3 (−0.9)	−19.9 (−3.8)	−10.8 (12.6)	−2.2 (28.0)	2.1 (35.8)	6.4 (43.5)	7.3 (45.1)	0.8 (33.4)	−3.0 (26.6)	−11.1 (12.0)	−15.4 (4.3)	−19.9 (−3.8)
Average precipitation mm (inches)	345.3 (13.59)	226.9 (8.93)	185.0 (7.28)	142.3 (5.60)	138.5 (5.45)	166.7 (6.56)	291.6 (11.48)	197.9 (7.79)	179.4 (7.06)	198.3 (7.81)	268.9 (10.59)	364.4 (14.35)	2,719 (107.05)
Average snowfall cm (inches)	378 (149)	291 (115)	196 (77)	69 (27)	3 (1.2)	0 (0)	0 (0)	0 (0)	0 (0)	0 (0)	40 (16)	278 (109)	1,265 (498)
Average extreme snow depth cm (inches)	209 (82)	255 (100)	234 (92)	159 (63)	15 (5.9)	0 (0)	0 (0)	0 (0)	0 (0)	0 (0)	19 (7.5)	114 (45)	262 (103)
Average precipitation days (≥ 1.0 mm)	26.1	21.1	19.9	14.5	12.2	11.7	15.1	12.9	13.8	15.4	19.1	24.5	206.3
Average snowy days (≥ 3 cm)	23.5	19.3	16.6	10.0	0.7	0	0	0	0	0	3.3	17.1	90.5
Mean monthly sunshine hours	26.4	46.1	94.6	155.8	195.9	151.1	123.2	143.4	109.7	108.2	75.9	35.8	1,263.7
Source: Japan Meteorological Agency

== Demographics ==
Per Japanese census data, the population of Nishikawa peaked around 1950 and has declined considerably since then. It is now less than half what it was a century ago.

Historical population
Year	Pop.	±%
1920	11,787	—
1930	13,307	+12.9%
1940	13,601	+2.2%
1950	15,527	+14.2%
1960	14,389	−7.3%
1970	10,740	−25.4%
1980	9,473	−11.8%
1990	8,554	−9.7%
2000	7,452	−12.9%
2010	6,270	−15.9%
2020	4,956	−21.0%

== History ==
The area of present-day Nishikawa was part of ancient Dewa Province. After the start of the Meiji period, the area became part of Nishimurayama District, Yamagata Prefecture. The town of Nishikawa was established on October 1, 1954, by the merger of the villages of Kawadoi, Nishiyama, Hondōji and Ōisawa.

== Economy ==
The economy of Nishikawa is based on seasonal tourism and forestry.

== Education ==
Nishikawa has one public elementary schools and one public middle school operated by the town government. The town does not have a high school.

== Transportation ==
=== Railway ===
Nishikawa is not served by any passenger rail service. The nearest station is Uzen-Takamatsu Station in the neighboring city of Sagae.

=== Highway ===
- Yamagata Expressway : Nishikawa IC, Gassan IC
- National Route 112

== Local attractions ==
- Iwanesawa Sanzan Shrine
- Mizugatoro Dam
- Mount Asahi
- Mount Gassan
- Sagae Dam

== Sister cities ==
- Frisco, Colorado, United States, since August 29, 1990
