= OES =

OES or oes may refer to:

== Organizations ==
- Bureau of Oceans and International Environmental and Scientific Affairs, the science bureau within the U.S. Department of State
- Ordo Equitum Solis, a French/Italian alternative music band
- Oregon Episcopal School, a school in Portland, Oregon, US
- Office of Emergency Services, a US governmental agency
- Order of the Eastern Star, a fraternal organisation
- On Every Street, an album by British rock band Dire Straits

== Other uses ==
=== OES ===
- Old East Slavic, a language
- Old English Sheepdog, a breed of herding dog often kept as a pet
- Open Enterprise Server, an amalgam of NetWare and Linux
- Occupational Employment Statistics, a US survey
- Optical Emissions Spectrometer, an instrument for testing chemical composition of metals
- Operators of essential services, critical infrastructure definition in the NIS Directive
- Oregon Episcopal School, high school in Portland, Oregon
- Original equipment supplier

=== Oes ===
- Oes, the plural for the name of the letter "O"
- Oes, a type of sequin

== See also ==
- oe (disambiguation)
