= Nishimurayama District =

District in Yamagata prefecture, Japan

Coordinates: 38.384°N 140.045°E

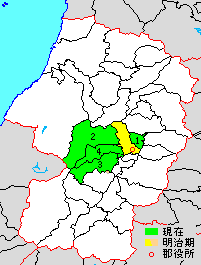
Map showing original extent of Nishimurayama District in Yamagata Prefecture yellow & green area=original extent in Meiji period; green=present area; 1=Kahoku, 2=Nishikawa, 3=Asahi, 4= Ōe

Nishimurayama District (西村山郡, Nishimurayama-gun) is a rural district located in Yamagata Prefecture, Japan. As of October 2013, the district has an estimated population of 41,272 and an area of 796.26 km^{2}. The city of Sagae and a portion of the city of Shirataka (now part of Nishiokitama District) were formerly part of Nishimurayama District.

== Towns and villages ==
- Asahi
- Kahoku
- Nishikawa
- Ōe

== History ==
Murayama County was an ancient place name in part of Dewa Province, occupying the area of modern Mogami, Kitamurayama, Higashimurayama and Nishimurayama districts. Under the Tokugawa shogunate, the area of Nishimurayama district was a complicated mosaic. The Tokugawa shogunate ruled 42 villages directly as tenryo; 60 villages were part of Dewa-Matsuyama Domain, 6 villages were part of Tatebayashi Domain, 5 villages were under Tanakura Domain, 5 villages were under Matsumae Domain, 4 villages were part of Shinjō Domain, 3 villages were ecclesiastical territory and 4 villages were split between two or more domains. The area became part of Yamagata Prefecture in 1876. At that time, Nishimurayama District consisted of 125 villages.

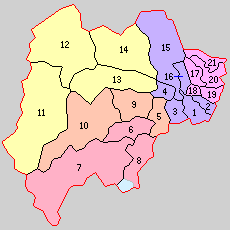
Historic Map of Nishimurayama District: 1. Sagae; 2. Nishine; 3. Shibahashi; 4. Takamatsu; 5. Aterazawa; 6. Ōtani; 7. Nishi-Imogawa; 8. Higashi-Imogawa; 9. Hongo; 10. Shichiken; 11. Ōizawa; 12. Hondoji; 13. Kawadoi; 14. Nishiyama; 15. Shiraiwa; 16. Daigo; 17. Nishisato; 18. Miizumi; 19. Mizonobe; 20. Yachi; 21. Kita-Yachi; 22. Tamano; 23. Tokiwa; Purple=Sagae City Yellow= Nishikawa Town Orange= Ōe Town Red=Kahoku Town Pink=Asahi Town Blue=to Shirataka Town

With the establishment of the municipality system on April 1, 1889, the district was consolidated into 21 villages.

- On January 7, 1893 Sagae was raised to town status
- On April 2, 1896 Yachi was raised to town status
- On August 17, 1896 Aterazawa was raised to town status
- On February 8, 1900 Shiraiwa was raised to town status
- On April 1, 1928 Miyajuku was raised to town status
- On August 1, 1954 the city of Sagae was founded by the merger of Sagae Town with four neighboring villages.
- On October 1, 1954 the towns of Nishikawa and Kahoku were founded
- On November 1, 1954 Miyakuju merged with two neighboring villages to form the town of Asahi. On the same day, the town of Shiraiwa was annexed by Sagae.
- On August 20, 1959 Aterazawa merged with a neighboring village to form the town of Ōe.
