= 7mm Narrow Gauge Association =

British railway modelling society

The 7mm Narrow Gauge Association is a United Kingdom based society for railway modellers interested in modelling narrow-gauge railways in British O scale (7mm to the foot, or 1:43.5 ratio).

== Scope of interest ==
The association covers modelling British narrow-gauge railways in the following gauges:

- O16.5. O scale on 16.5mm track, representing 2 ft 4 1/4 in gauge. This scale is widely used to model railways of 2 ft (610 mm), 2 ft 3 in (686 mm) and 2 ft 6 in (762 mm) gauges. The use of a 16.5mm gauge allows the use of 00 gauge mechanisms and wheels. Most commercial equipment is available for this gauge.
- O14 Using 14mm gauge track giving an exact scale conversion for 2 ft (610 mm) gauge prototypes.
- O21 Fine scale modelling of 3 ft (914 mm) gauge prototypes on 21mm gauge track.
- O9 Using 9mm or N gauge track to represent amusement park and estate railways.

However other gauges and O scales are also accepted. For instance, members modelling American narrow gauge often use On30, and Oe when modelling European prototypes. While many members model British railways, prototypes from all round the world are catered for, including the railways of countries that were part of Britain's former empire.

== History ==
The association was founded in 1979.

== Membership ==
The current membership of the association is around of 900 members. Most are resident in the United Kingdom, but about 10% live overseas. The association has 6 local groups in different areas of Britain, and two groups based outside Britain.

== Publications ==
The association publishes a bi-monthly magazine, Narrow Lines, which is posted free to all members. Additionally, the association has published a series of 5 handbooks on various aspects of modelling, and a series of 12 booklets containing scale drawings of various items of narrow-gauge rolling stock.
