= Kahoku, Yamagata =

Kahoku 河北町
- Town
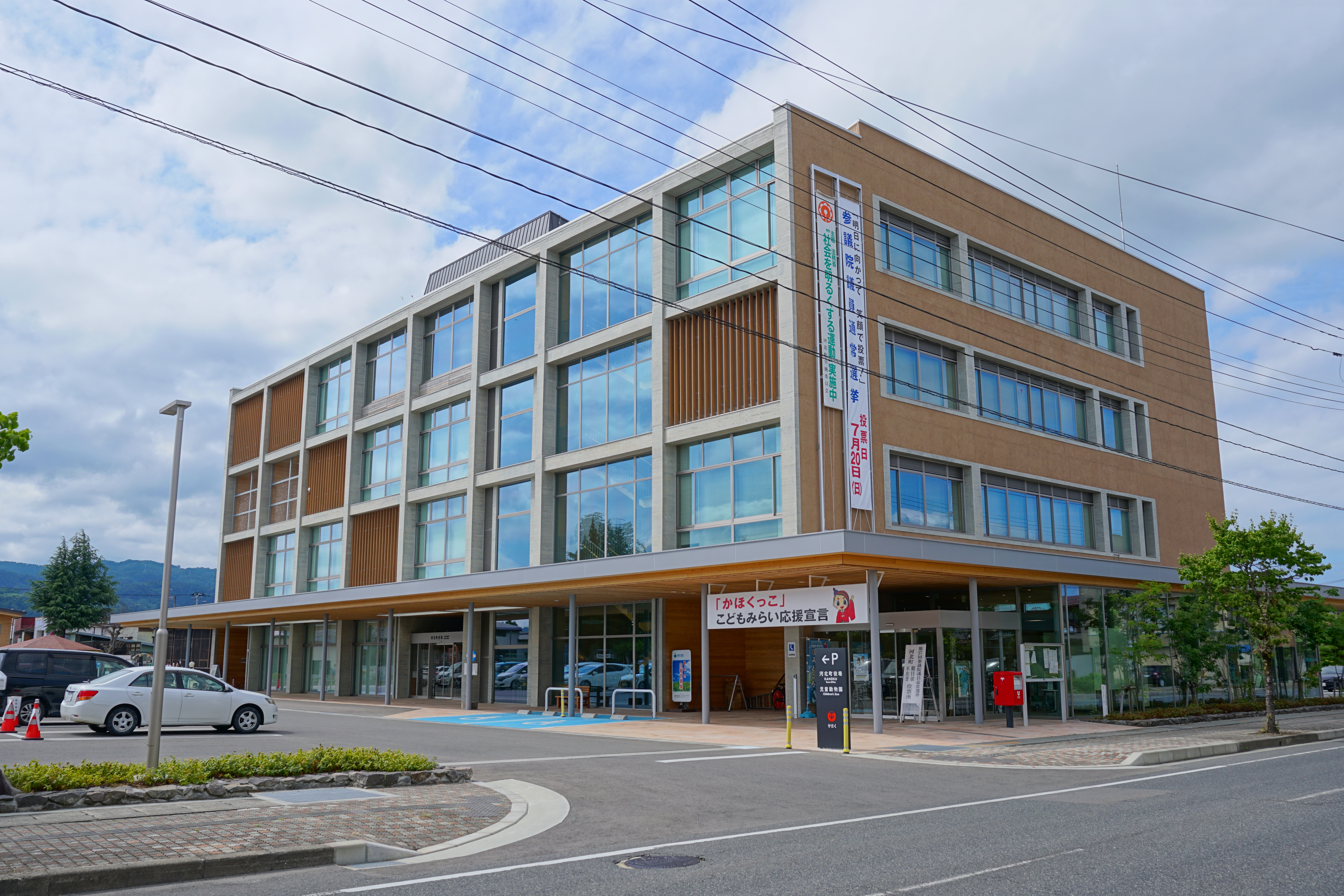

- Flag Seal

- Location of Kahoku in Yamagata Prefecture

- Coordinates: 38°25′35″N 140°18′52″E
- Country: Japan
- Region: Tōhoku
- Prefecture: Yamagata
- District: Nishimurayama

Area
  - Total: 52.38 km^{2} (20.22 sq mi)

Population (February 2020)
  - Total: 18,301
  - Density: 349.4/km^{2} (904.9/sq mi)
- Time zone: UTC+9 (Japan Standard Time)
- Flower: Safflower
- Phone number: 0237-73-2111
- Address: 81 Yachi, Kahoku-chō, Nishimurayama-gun, Yamagata-ken 999-3511
- Website: Official website

Kahoku (河北町, Kahoku-chō) is a town located in Yamagata Prefecture, Japan. As of 29 February 2020, the town had an estimated population of 19,303, in 6267 households and a population density of 350 persons per km^{2}. The total area of the town is 52.38 square kilometres (20 sq mi).

== Geography ==
Kahoku is located in central Yamagata Prefecture, in a river valley of the Mogami River, with branches of the Ōu Mountains to the east and west.

=== Neighboring municipalities ===
- Yamagata Prefecture
  - Higashine
  - Murayama
  - Sagae
  - Tendō

=== Climate ===
Kahoku has a humid continental climate (Köppen climate classification Cfa) with large seasonal temperature differences, with warm to hot (and often humid) summers and cold (sometimes severely cold) winters. Precipitation is significant throughout the year, but is heaviest from August to October. The average annual temperature in Kahoku is 11.6 °C. The average annual rainfall is 1461 mm with September as the wettest month. The temperatures are highest on average in August, at around 25.3 °C, and lowest in January, at around -1.1 °C.

== Demographics ==
Per Japanese census data, the population of Kahoku has declined over the past 60 years.

Historical population
| Year | Pop. | ±% |
|---|---|---|
| 1960 | 25,873 | — |
| 1970 | 22,643 | −12.5% |
| 1980 | 21,880 | −3.4% |
| 1990 | 22,287 | +1.9% |
| 2000 | 21,476 | −3.6% |
| 2010 | 19,959 | −7.1% |
| 2020 | 17,641 | −11.6% |

== History ==
The area of present-day Kahoku was part of ancient Dewa Province. After the start of the Meiji period, the area became part of Nishimurayama District, Yamagata Prefecture. The village of Yachi was established with the creation of the modern municipalities system on April 1, 1889, and was raised to town status on April 2, 1896. The town of Kahoku was established on April 1, 1954.

== Economy ==
The economy of Kahoku is based on agriculture, notably the growing of cherries. The area was traditionally noted for raising safflowers. Manufacturing of slippers is also an important local industry.

== Education ==
Kahoku has six public elementary schools and one public middle school operated by the town government and one public high schools operated by the Yamagata Prefectural Board of Education.

== Transportation ==
=== Railway ===
Kahoku does not have any passenger railway service.

=== Highway ===
- National Route 287
- National Route 347

== Sister cities ==
- Cañon City, Colorado, United States, since October 20, 1993
