= REC-90 =

Blend of gasoline

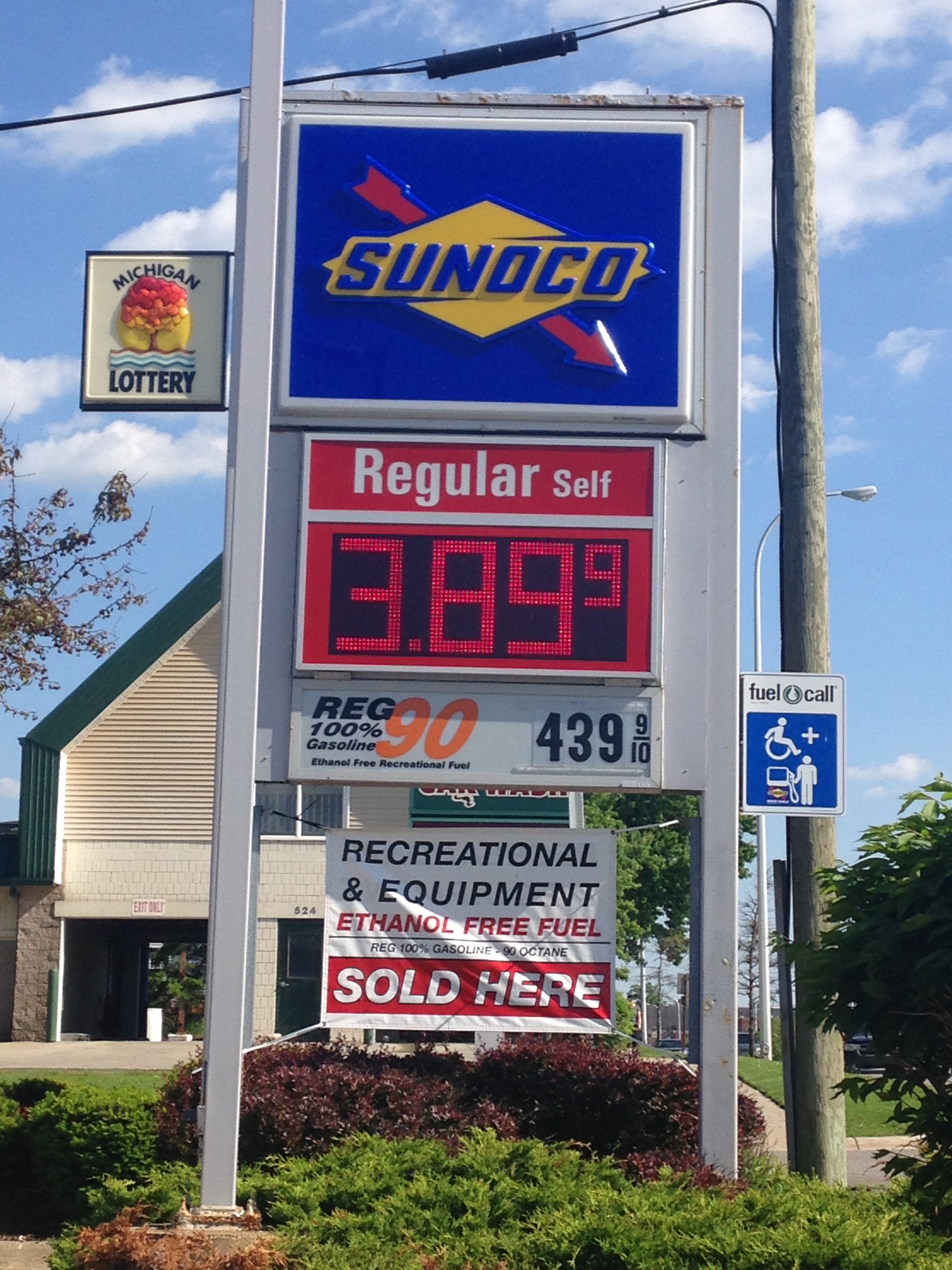
Brighton, MI Sunoco Price sign advertising availability of Rec-90 Gasoline.

REC-90 is an ethanol-free, 90 octane unleaded gasoline blend designed for use in recreational/marine engines which can be damaged by the ethanol found in other gasoline blends. It is also usable in some aviation engines and automotive engines, though it has not been thoroughly tested for cars and trucks.

Unlike most stations in the plains states which carry ethanol-free 87 octane unleaded alongside 10% ethanol 87 octane unleaded, many states carry ethanol-free gasoline specifically marketed as recreational fuel designed for marine equipment and small engines.

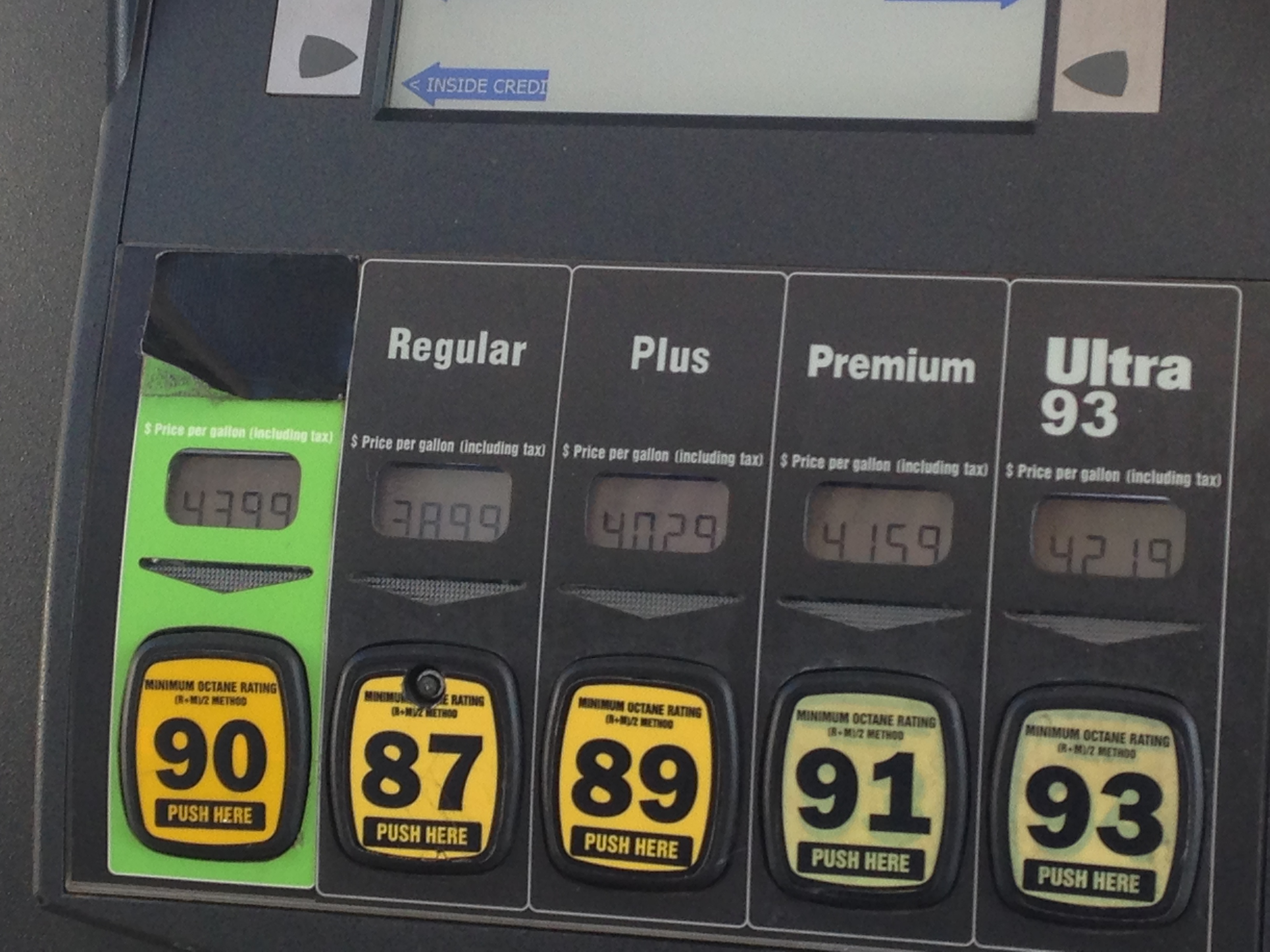
Pump grades at the Brighton, MI Sunoco, including Rec-90 ethanol-free 100% gasoline.

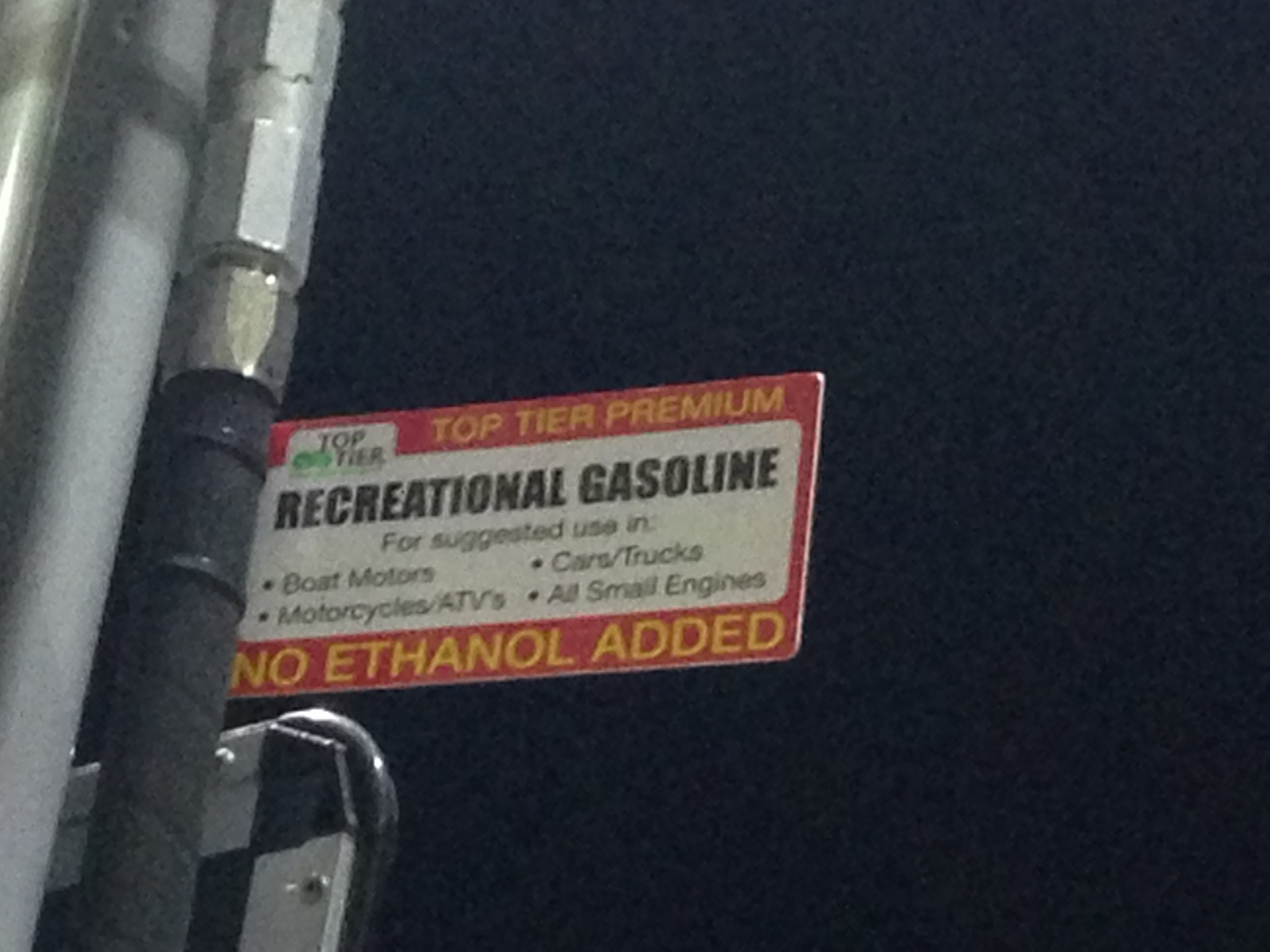
Hose label at Kwik Trip location in Cross Plains, WI advertising that ethanol-free can safely be used in automotive engines.

== Rec-90 Availability and Pricing ==
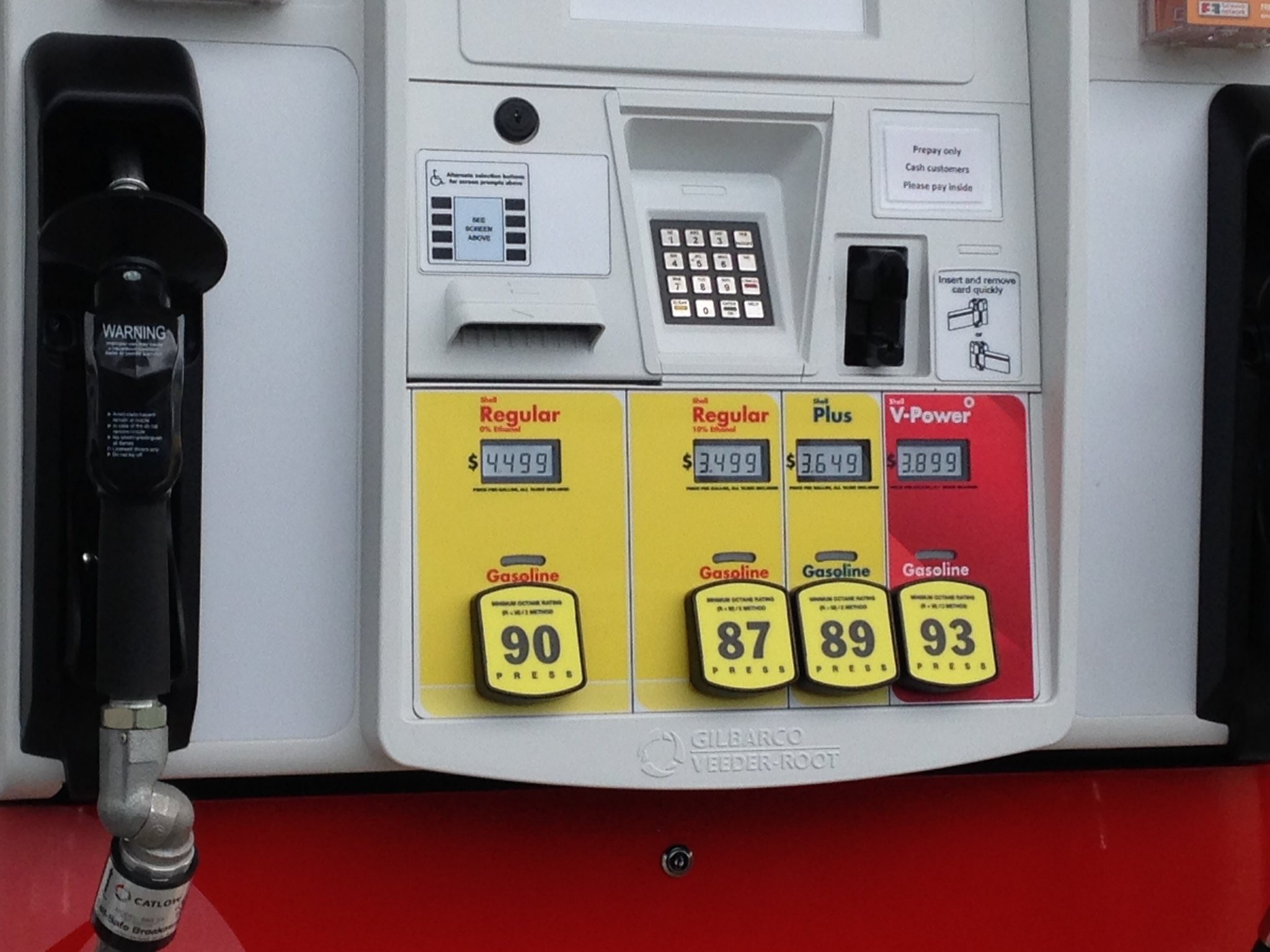
Picture showing E0 100% gasoline at $1/gallon more than E10 Regular Unleaded. At this same Saugatuck, MI Shell station, E85 was an additional $1/gallon below regular ($2/gallon below ethanol-free Rec-90).

As debate has ensued over ethanol blending in gasolines, ethanol-free has popped up in a number of states marketed as Rec-90 Recreational Gasoline. Because there is no cheap oxygenate in Rec-90 gasoline, Rec-90 is almost always significantly more expensive per gallon than E10 "Regular Gasoline".

According to the crowd-sourced website e85prices.com, there are several dozen stations known in the United States to carry ethanol-free fuel. The following is a table listing the number of known stations in each state to carry ethanol-free fuel.

== List of states with known number of ethanol-free gasoline or Rec-90 stations ==
This list shows only a few of the thousands of stations with ethanol-free gas. See the link below for Pure-Gas.Org for a more complete list.

State	Number of known stations	Rec-90 or General Ethanol-Free Gasoline	Available Locations
Alabama	1	90 Rec	Enterprise, AL; Dothan, AL
Alaska	0	N/A	N/A
Arizona	0	N/A	N/A
Arkansas	0	N/A	N/A
California	0	N/A	N/A
Connecticut	0	N/A	N/A
Delaware	0	N/A	N/A
District of Columbia	0	N/A	N/A
Florida	12	Rec-90 and/or ethanol-free	Cape Coral, FL (Sam's Club); Alachua, FL; Boynton Beach, FL; Brandon, FL; East Palatka, Fl (Raceway 87 octane ethanol-free); Florida City, FL; Lauderdale Lakes, FL; Marathon, FL; Miami, FL; Panama City Beach, FL; Pompano Beach, FL; Okeechobee, FL; Sarasota, Fl; St James City, FL (Monroe Canal Marina); Spring Hill, FL (Circle K); Titusville, FL; Vero Beach, FL; Wilton Manors, FL
Georgia	3	Rec 90	Valero, Woodstock, GA; Ridleys, Tallapoosa, GA; Valero, Bogart, GA
Idaho	0	N/A	N/A
Illinois	1	Rec 90	Poplar Grove, IL
Indiana	2	Rec 90	Jacobi Food Mart, Floyds Knobs, IN; Marathon, New Albany, IN; Marathon, Sellersburg, IN; Marathon, Simonton Lake, IN; Shell, Greencastle, IN; Shell, Angola, IN; Angola One Stop, Angola, IN; CITGO, Angola, IN; Qycco, Jasper, IN
Iowa	0	General Ethanol-Free Gasoline	N/A
Kansas	0	N/A	N/A
Kentucky	3	REC-90	Taylorsville, Ky (Sunrise Market (Cricketz)); Somerset, Ky (Pulaski Performance fuels; Georgetown, KY (Southern States); 601 Ogden street     REC 90 also 110,112,116 and 118      leaded and unleaded race fuels)
Louisiana	0	N/A	N/A
Maryland	0	N/A	N/A
Massachusetts	0	N/A	N/A
Michigan	33	Rec-90 Only	Alto, MI; Big Rapids, MI; Brighton, MI; Briner Oil Jonesville, MI; Shell, 41350 Ford Rd, Canton, MI; Caro, MI; Dave's Place Cheboygan, MI; Davison, MI; Dearborn Ford-Tel Marathon, Dearborn, MI; The Depot Edmore, MI; Elkton, MI; Fennville BP Fennville, MI; Ertie’s Forest Trail, Free Soil, MI; Charlie's Country Corner Grayling, MI; Harrison, MI; Kinde, MI; Ludington EZ Mart, Ludington, MI; Northside Market, Ludington, MI; Luzerne, MI; Filer EZ Mart, Manistee, MI; Dandy Randy’s BP Mason, MI; Wilson’s General Store Mears, MI; Mio, MI; Mount Pleasant, MI; Port Huron Speedy Q), MI; Pigeon, MI; Pinckney, MI; St. Louis, MI; Saugatuck, MI; Shelby Township, MI Circle K; Pic N Pac Norton Shores, MI; Gratiot express stop BP Saginaw, MI; South Haven, MI; Marathon Gas, 64885 M-66, Sturgis, MI; Magic Motorsports Waterford, MI; Meijer Coldwater, MI; Meijer, Hillsdale, MI; White Lake Kroger White Lake, MI; Admiral Williamston, MI; Vinckier Foods & Ace Hardware Almont, MI; Hammond Hardware Jackson, MI
Minnesota	0	N/A	N/A
Mississippi	0	N/A	N/A
Missouri	0	N/A	N/A
Montana	0	N/A	N/A
Nebraska	1	General Ethanol-Free Gasoline	Omaha, NE
Nevada	0	N/A	N/A
New Jersey	0	N/A	N/A
New Mexico	0	N/A	N/A
New York	0	N/A	N/A
North Carolina	1	General Ethanol-Free/Premium Ethanol-Free	Calabash, NC
North Dakota	0	N/A	N/A
Ohio	14	REC - 90	Oregon, Ohio; Canton, Ohio; Strasburg, Ohio; Massillon, Ohio; Dover, Ohio; Alliance, Ohio; Tuslaw, Ohio; Malvern, Ohio; Tipp City, Ohio; Wooster, Ohio; South Russell, Ohio; Hartville, Ohio; Bolivar, Ohio; Perrysville, Ohio
Oklahoma	0	N/A	N/A
Oregon	0	N/A	N/A
Pennsylvania	2	REC 90	Uniontown, PA; Harrisburg, PA
South Carolina	0	N/A	N/A
South Dakota	0	N/A	N/A
Tennessee	3	General Ethanol-Free/Premium Ethanol-Free	Clinton, TN - Memphis TN (rec90); Etowah, TN - East TN (rec90)
Texas	1	N/A	• Round Rock, TX
Utah	0	N/A	N/A
Virginia	4	REC 90	Hardy, VA; Pilot, VA; Amelia, VA; New Canton, VA
Washington	0	N/A	N/A
West Virginia	3	General Ethanol-Free/Premium Ethanol-Free	Parkersburg, WV; Huntington, WV (REC-90); Cheat Lake, WV (BFS Station near RT43)
Wisconsin	1	General Ethanol-Free/Premium Ethanol-Free	Cross Plains, WI
Wyoming	0	N/A	N/A
