= ScaleSeven =

Set of finescale model railway standards

ScaleSeven (S7)
- Scale: 7 mm per foot
- Scale ratio: 1:43.5
- Standard(s): ScaleSeven
- Model gauge: 33 mm (1.3 in) (standard) 36.75 mm (1.447 in) (Irish) 49.2 mm (1.937 in) (Brunel)
- Prototype gauge: 1,435 mm (4 ft 8 1/2 in) standard gauge 5 ft 3 in (1,600 mm) Irish gauge 7 ft (2,134 mm) Brunel gauge
- Website: http://www.scaleseven.org.uk

ScaleSeven (S7) is a set of finescale model railway standards for 1:43.5 (7 mm scale) using true-to-prototype track and wheel standards. It is principally used to model British standard gauge (4 ft 8 1/2 in (1,435 mm)), Irish Broad Gauge (5 ft 3 in (1,600 mm)), or Great Western broad gauge (7 ft (2,134 mm)).

== See also ==
- Rail transport modelling scales
- Model railway scales
