= 7 mm scale =

Model railway scale

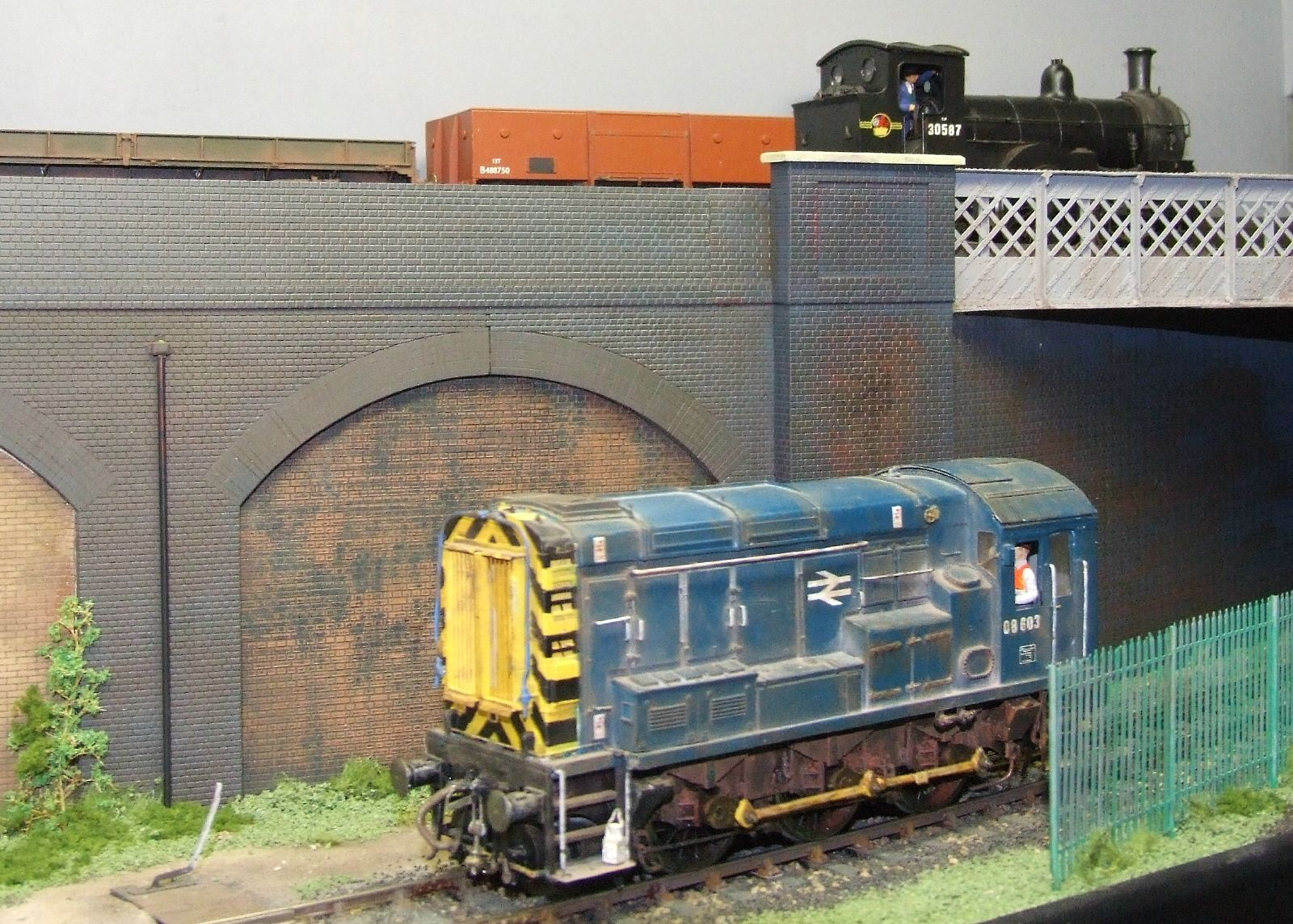
- O gauge layout at the Trains and Boats exhibition
- Scale: 7 mm to 1 ft
- Scale ratio: 1:43.5
- Model gauge: multiple

7 mm scale, also known as British O scale, is a model railway scale of 1:43.5 (or 7 mm to 1 ft; hence its name). The scale is thus different from American O scale (1:48) and European O scale (1:45). For standard gauge railways, 32mm gauge, or 0 gauge is most commonly used. ScaleSeven (S7) standard however specifies 33 mm gauge, which is closer to scale. For narrow gauge modelling, 16.5 mm gauge

| Name | Model gauge | Scaled gauge | Prototype gauge |
Prototype standard gauges
| British 0 gauge | 32 mm (0 gauge) | 4' 6¾" | Standard gauge |
| ScaleSeven (standard) | 33 mm | 4' 8½" | 4 ft 8 1/2 in (1,435 mm) standard gauge |
Prototype broad gauges
| ScaleSeven (Irish) | 36.75 mm | 5' 3" | 5 ft 3 in (1,600 mm) Irish gauge |
| ScaleSeven (Great Western) | 49.2 mm | 7' 0¼" | 7 ft (2,134 mm) Great Western broad gauge |
Prototype narrow gauges
| O21 | 21 mm | 3' | 3 ft (914 mm) |
| O16.5 | 16.5 mm (H0 gauge) | 2' 4¼" | 2' - 2'6" |
| O14 | 14 mm | 2' | 2 ft (610 mm) |
| O9 | 9 mm (N gauge) | 15½" | 15 in (381 mm) |
