= On30 gauge =

Model railroad scale

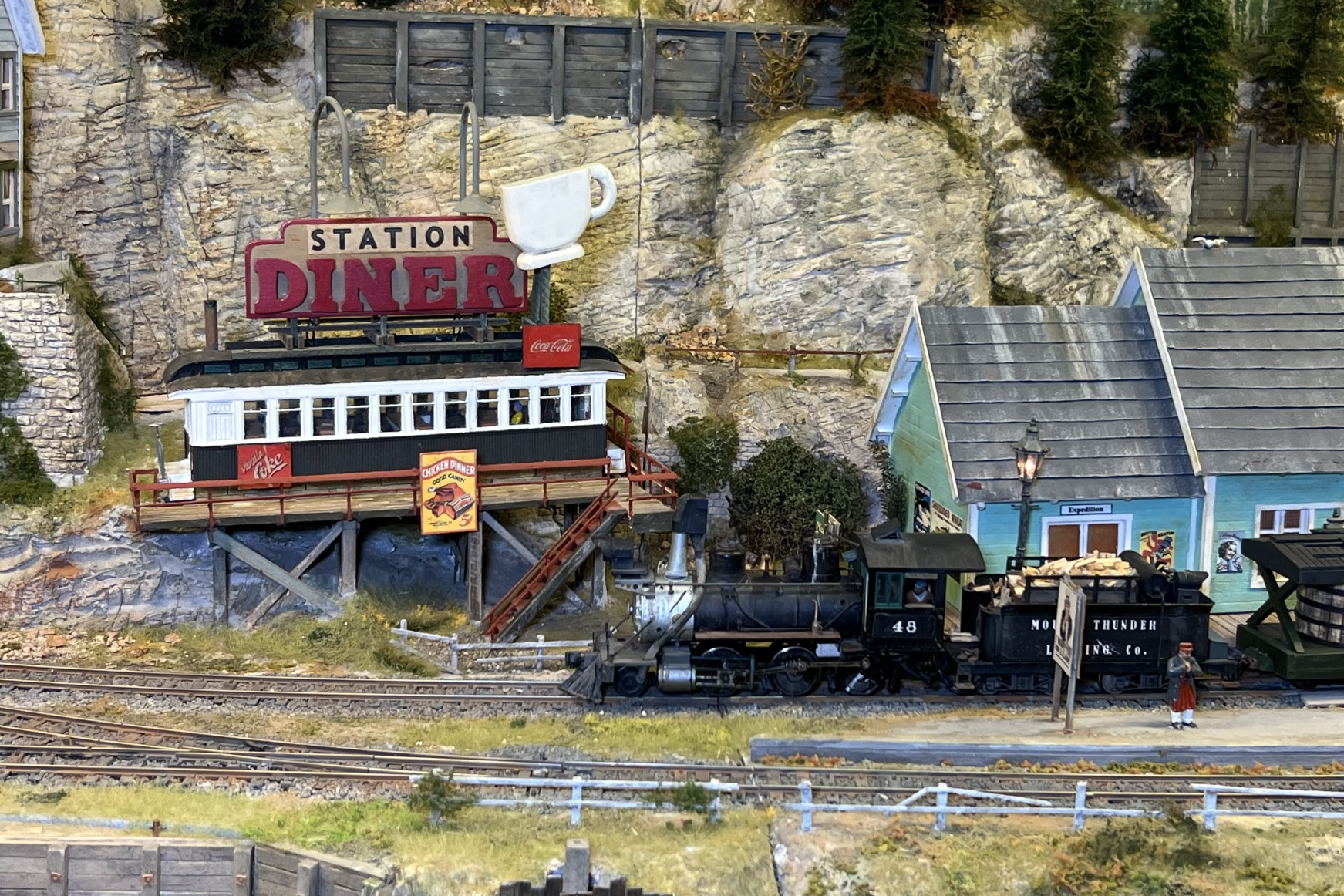
Layout Stirmouth & Southern Railroad Company in On30 gauge, based on the Bachmann Industries models.

On30 (also called On2 1/2, O16.5 and Oe) gauge is the modelling of narrow gauge railways in O scale on HO (16.5 mm / 0.65 in) gauge track in 1:48 scale ratio by American and Australian model railroaders, in 1:43.5 scale ratio by British and French model railroaders and 1:45 by Continental European model railroaders (excluding France).

== Definitions ==
=== On30 ===
On30
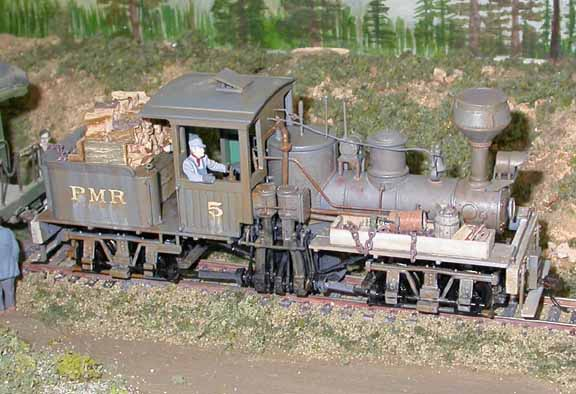
- A Shay locomotive in On30 gauge, based on the Bachmann Industries model.
- Scale: 1/4 in to 1 ft (1:48)
- Scale ratio: 1:48
- Model gauge: 16.5 mm (0.65 in)
- Prototype gauge: 2 ft 6 in (762 mm)

On30 uses the American O scale of 1/4 inch to the foot, (ratio 1:48) to operate trains on HO gauge (16.5 mm / 0.65 in) track. The 30 indicates the scale/gauge combination is used to model 2 ft 6 in (762 mm) narrow gauge prototypes, although it is often used to model 2 ft (610 mm) and 3 ft (914 mm) gauge prototypes as well. This scale/gauge combination is sometimes referred to as On2 1/2.

=== O16.5 ===
O16.5
- Scale: 7 mm to 1 ft
- Scale ratio: 1:43.5
- Model gauge: 16.5 mm (0.65 in)
- Prototype gauge: 2 ft 6 in (762 mm)

O16.5 (sometimes O-16.5) in the United Kingdom is a model railway scale/gauge combination of 7 mm to the foot. This is the same scale as British O scale (1:43.5 ratio) running on 16.5 mm (0.65 in) gauge track, which is also used by OO gauge model railways. It thus represents the prototype gauge of just over 2 ft 4 in (711 mm) (e.g. the Snailbeach District Railways), although also widely used to model 2 ft (610 mm) (e.g. the Ffestiniog Railway) and 2 ft 3 in (686 mm) (e.g. the Tal-y-llyn Railway) gauge UK prototypes.

=== 0e ===
0e
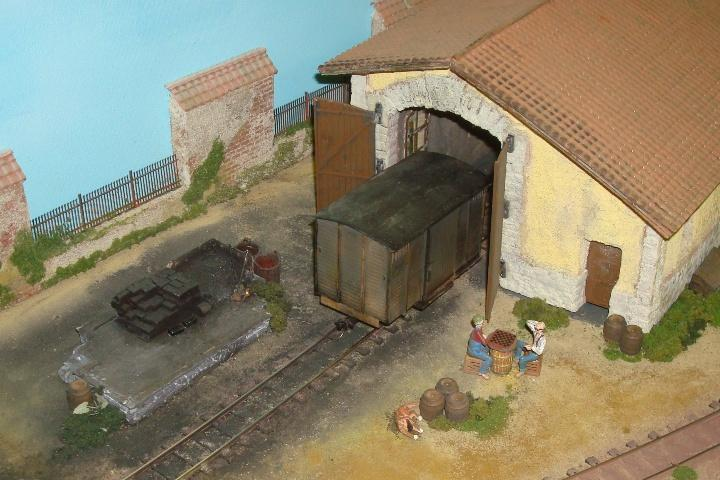
- Saint-Paul railway depot at Suisse Toy in Berne (Switzerland)
- Scale ratio: 1:45 and 1:43.5
- Model gauge: 16.5 mm (0.65 in)
- Prototype gauge: 750 mm (2 ft 5 1/2 in), 760 mm (2 ft 5 15/16 in), 800 mm (2 ft 7 1/2 in)

0e (sometimes Oe) is the Continental European notation for 0 scale using 16.5 mm (0.65 in) track. In France and a few other countries 0 scale uses a ratio of 1:43.5. In Germany and many other European countries 0 scale uses a ratio of 1:45. The prototypes represented as example the German 750 mm (2 ft 5 1/2 in) gauge, Austrian 760 mm (2 ft 5 15/16 in) gauge, and 800 mm (2 ft 7 1/2 in) gauge rack railways in Switzerland.

== Development ==
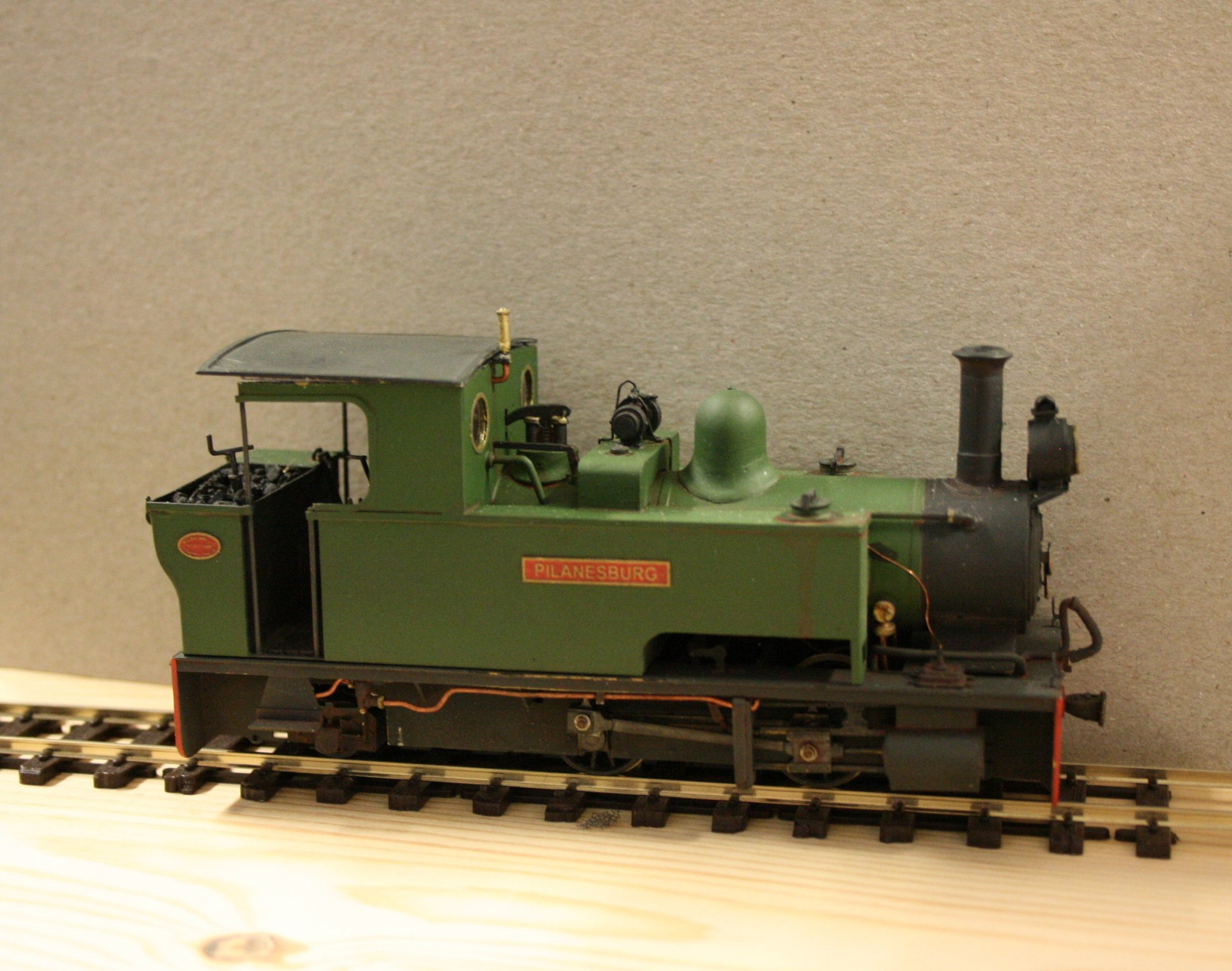
British O16.5 gauge model based on a Bagnall 0-4-2T design.

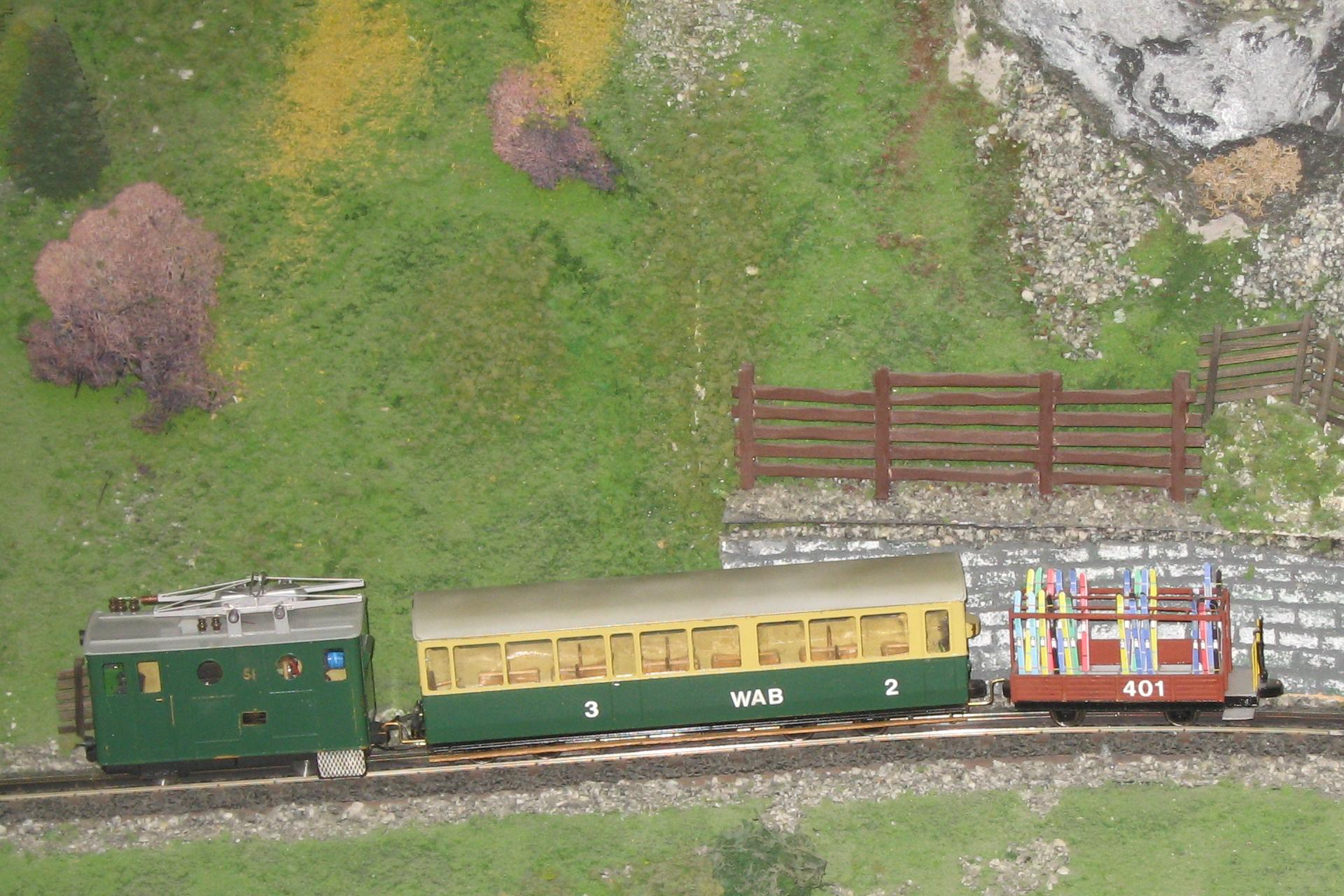
Swiss Oe gauge rack railway. Modell of Wengernalp railway (WAB)

=== United States ===
In the United States modelling in On30 dates back to the 1950s, using HO gauge wheels and locomotive chassis. The scale was popularised to some extent in the 1960s and 1970s by the writings of modellers such as Gordon North. An On30 layout, the Venago Valley (built by Bill Livingston) was featured in the June 1971 issue of Railroad Model Craftsman magazine. However, as there are very few prototype 2 ft 6 in (762 mm) gauge railways in the United States, it remained very much a minority modelling area, especially when compared with modelling in On2 and On3.

In 1998 Bachmann Industries introduced a model of a 2-6-0 steam locomotive in this scale for the Christmas village market. This model, being very inexpensive, was quickly adopted by modellers. Other manufacturers followed Bachmann into this market, and Bachmann also introduced a number of other models. On30 is now regarded as the fastest growing segment of the model railroading market in the United States.

Several other companies have produced mass market models for the USA market including Mountain Model Imports (MMI) who produced die-cast K series DRGW models (also available in 0n3), Broadway Limited who produced a 2-8-0 and a "galloping goose", San Juan Car company produce kits and RTR plastic wagons, Accucraft/AMS produce brass engines and plastic rolling stock.

Many US modellers can be broadly cast into one of two groups:

The first group are freelance modelers, not modelling any specific prototype. These modelers are adept at taking H0 gauge models and modifying them with new cabs and other features into models without prototypes. A common saying in this group of modelers is that they model with "no standards", a reaction to the highly accurate modelling known as "rivet counting" found in some other sections of the hobby.

The second group model prototype American narrow gauge railroads ranging from mining and logging companies through to large shortline railways such as the 2 ft (610 mm) Sandy River and Rangeley Lakes and the 3 ft (914 mm) Denver and Rio Grande Western Railroad. Modelers following these prototypes often choose On30 over the more accurate On2 and On3 gauges citing the lower cost of models and the ready availability of 'ready-to-run' models by Bachmann, Accucraft Trains and Broadway Limited. Detail parts and kits for specific models can be adapted easily from models manufactured for On3 modellers and others.

=== Britain ===
In Britain O16.5 modelling also began in the 1950s, using modified proprietary OO scale models. A number of small companies now supply kits for locomotives made of materials such as brass and white metal, as well as rolling stock kits. British modellers have also had the advantage of Peco flexible track and turnouts, which have become popular throughout the On30 modelling world. The 7mm Narrow Gauge Association supports the hobby, and publishes a magazine, "Narrow Lines". Most modellers attempt to accurately model one of the many 2 ft (610 mm), 2 ft 3 in (686 mm) and 2 ft 6 in (762 mm) gauge railways that were found throughout Britain, although European, American and even railways from Britain's colonial empire have become popular. First items in the PECO O-16.5 range of track, and rolling stock kits appeared early in 1978, with other items released over the next 2-3 years to become a large part of the range that we have today.

For accurate modelling of two-foot gauge railways, such as the Ffestiniog or Lynton and Barnstaple O14 has been employed, although there is some limited commercial support for this scale/gauge, it is mostly of industrial prototypes.

=== Continental Europe ===
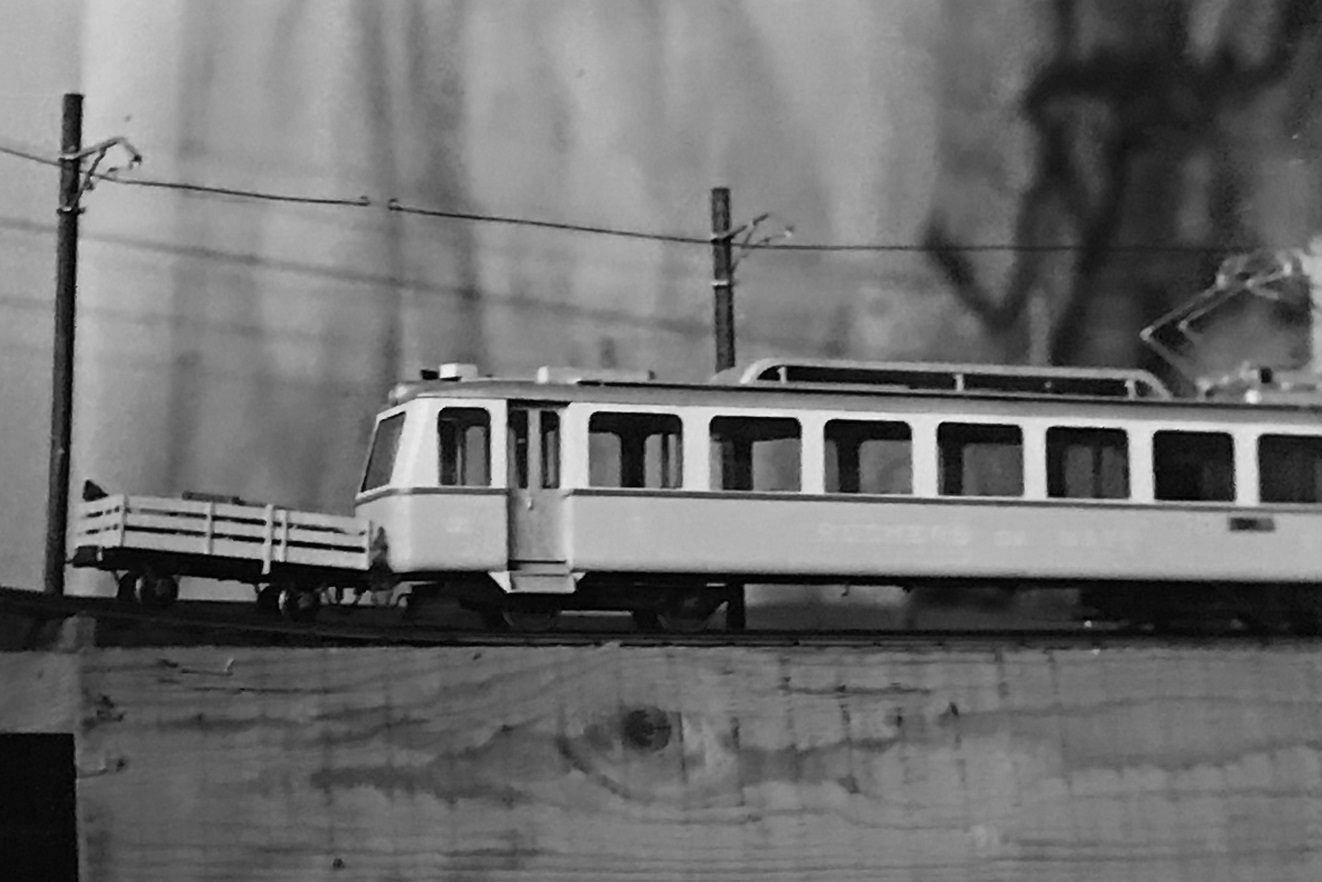
Probably oldest known gauge 0e vehicles in the MCB shortly after 1940. Rack railway train of the GN.

The first known 0e gauge model railway is probably the rack railway of the Basel Model Railway Club (MCB), german: Modelleisenbahnclub Basel, in Switzerland can be traced back to 1938. Just a few years after Trix and Märklin independently launched 00 gauge products with a model gauge of 16.5 mm. In 1957, an early gauge 0e modell railroad line according to the Mariazell Railway was built on the club layout of the St. Pölten Railway Model Club, german: Eisenbahnmodellbauklub St. Pölten, in Austria, based on experience with 0e gauge railway models built in the years after 1948. The narrow gauge rack railway in Basel, the narrow gauge railway in St. Pölten, as well as the following Billerbahn were initially assigned to gauge 00. This, as far as Billerbahn is concerned, even in 1956. The term '0 scale' as well as the term 'gauge 0e' did not exist at that time.

A similar pattern of small manufacturers producing kits is followed in Continental Europe. However the German firm Fleischmann produced ready-to-run models until a few years ago of small German and Austrian locomotives and associated rolling stock in Oe gauge on a scale of about 1:40. The line was called "Magic Train". "Billerbahn" was already producing its field railway from 1948 to 1977. Märklin also produced a small range of 3 rail 0e gauge models between 1970 and 1972 under the "MINEX" range name. All three ranges were aimed at children but had appeal to serious modelers too.

=== Australia ===
Surveys at modelling conventions in Australia have found that the majority of all narrow gauge modellers in that country model in On30, 1:48 scale. An early pioneer was Rick Richardson, with his Vulcan Vale model railway. Recent examples include 'Steam in the Bush' who are based in the Blue Mountains and produce a range of On30 'craftsman' style kits. Many modelers choose to model the 2ft6in gauge railways in Victoria, such as Puffing Billy, and a number of kits and ready to run models have been produced for that prototype. A ready to run die-cast and plastic model of the NA Puffing Billy locomotive was released by Haskell in 2014 and they have subsequently also released NQR openwagons. The scale is also popular for modelers of timber logging tramways and the Queensland sugar cane tramways, as well as freelance modelers. Ixion produced a "Coffee Pot" (a 3-foot 6 gauge prototype) for this market. A small number of models have also been produced in 7 mm:1 ft scale, mostly of New South Wales prototypes.

=== Japan ===
On30 is also modeled in Japan, where it is used to represent the 2 ft 6 in (762 mm) narrow gauge railways, such as the Kiso Forest Railway, that were once quite common in that country. Several brass locomotive kits have been produced.

== Summary ==
The following table lists the most popular narrow gauges in O scale:

Name	Scale	Model gauge	Use for the prototype gauge	Selection of frequently used prototype gauge	Used for
Op	1:45 or 1:43.5	9 mm (0.354 in)	300 to <400 mm	381 mm	Continental European
O-9	1:43,5	9 mm (0.354 in)	381 mm	381 mm (15 in)	British
Of	1:45 or 1:43.5	12 mm (0.472 in)	400 to <650 mm	500 mm and 600 mm	Continental European
On2	1:48	0.5 in (12,7 mm)	2 ft (610 mm)		American
O-14	1:45 or 1:43.5	14 mm (0.551 in)	600 mm (1 ft 11 5/8 in)		Continental European, British
O-14	1:43,5	14 mm (0.551 in)	610 mm (2 ft)		2 ft gauge railways in South Africa
On30 (On2 1/2)	1:48	16.5 mm (0.65 in)	2 ft 6 in (762 mm)		American, Australian, Japanese
Oe	1:45 or 1:43.5 5	16.5 mm (0.65 in)	650 to <850 mm	750 mm, 760 mm and 800 mm	Continental European
O-16.5	1:43.5	16.5 mm (0.65 in)	2 ft 6 in (762 mm)		British, majority accordingly H0 and 00 gauge track
O-18	1:43.5	18 mm (0.709 in)	2 ft 6 in (762 mm)		British, minority
On3	1:48	0.75 in (19.05 mm)	3 ft (914 mm)		American, Irish
Om (O-22,5)	1:45 or 1:43.5	22.5 mm (0.886 in)	850 to <1250 mm	900 mm, 950 mm, 1000 mm and 1067 mm	Continental European
Om (O-22.2)	1:45	22.2 mm (7/8 in, 0.875 in) for finescale standard	1000 mm	Metre-gauge railway only	Continental European
On3 1/2	1:43.5	22.5 mm (0.886 in)	3 ft 6 in (1,067 mm)		British, Cape Gauge
OJ	1:45	24 mm (0.945 in)	3 ft 6 in (1,067 mm)		Japanese, Cape Gauge

== Remarks ==
Model railroaders with layouts and rolling stocks by American standard and usually by British standard, use for designation of the scale in English language publications the letter O and not the number 0.

In British and sometimes in French-speaking countries, for narrow gauge it is written after designation of the scale the model gauge in mm. As examples OO9 or OO6.5 in United Kingdom and H09 at the place of H0e or H06,5 at the place of H0f in France.

== See also ==
- Rail transport modelling scales
- Model railway scales

== Bibliography ==
- Model Railroader magazine
- Narrow Gauge and Shortline Gazette magazine
- "Narrow Lines" magazine
- "Proceedings of the Australian Narrow Gauge Convention 2005"
