= Ōe, Yamagata =

Ōe 大江町
- Town
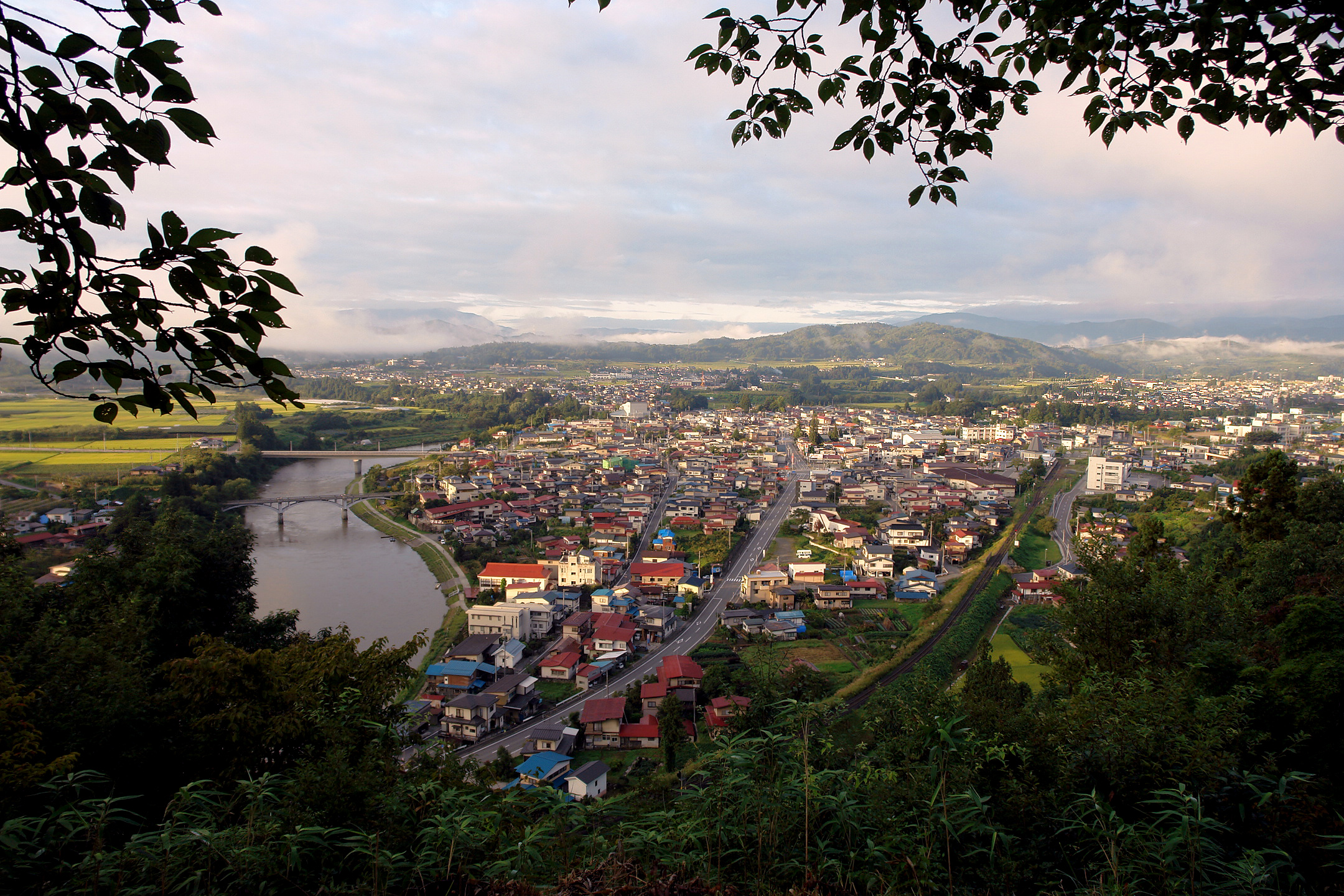
- Aterazawa neighborhood of Ōe

- Flag Seal

- Location of Ōe in Yamagata Prefecture

- Coordinates: 38°22′50.7″N 140°12′24.5″E
- Country: Japan
- Region: Tōhoku
- Prefecture: Yamagata
- District: Nishimurayama

Area
  - Total: 153.92 km^{2} (59.43 sq mi)

Population (February 2020)
  - Total: 7,894
  - Density: 51.29/km^{2} (132.8/sq mi)
- Time zone: UTC+9 (Japan Standard Time)
- Phone number: 0237-62-2111
- Address: 882-1 Aterazawa, Ōe-machi, Nishimurayama-gun, Yamagata-ken 990-1101
- Climate: Cfa/Dfa
- Website: Official website
- Symbols
- Bird: Crested kingfisher
- Fish: Masu salmon
- Flower: Hydrangea macrophylla
- Tree: Cryptomeria

Ōe (大江町, Ōe-machi) is a town located in Yamagata Prefecture, Japan. As of 1 February 2020, the town had an estimated population of 7,894 in 2828 households, and a population density of 51 persons per km^{2}. The total area of the town is 153.92 square kilometres (59 sq mi).

== Geography ==
Ōe is located in mountainous central Yamagata. Like many small towns in Japan, Ōe is a collection of smaller hamlets. Elevation rises and populations decrease from east to west. The easternmost hamlet is Aterazawa, and contains about 4/5 of the town's population. The town extends from the west end of the central part of the Yamagata basin to the Asahi Mountains. In addition, it has several enclaves in Sagae city and Nakayama town, bordering the east. Administratively, the town area is divided from the east into the Sazawa, Hongo, and Shichiken districts. The Mogami River forms the eastern border of the town.

=== Neighboring municipalities ===
- Yamagata Prefecture
  - Asahi
  - Nakayama
  - Nishikawa
  - Sagae
  - Yamanobe

=== Climate ===
Ōe has a humid continental climate (Köppen climate classification Cfa) with large seasonal temperature differences, with warm to hot (and often humid) summers and cold (sometimes severely cold) winters. Precipitation is significant throughout the year, but is heaviest from August to October. The average annual temperature in Ōe is 10.7 °C (51.3 °F). The average annual rainfall is 1,410.6 mm (55.54 in) with July as the wettest month. The temperatures are highest on average in August, at around 23.7 °C (74.7 °F), and lowest in January, at around −1.3 °C (29.7 °F).

Climate data for Aterazawa, Ōe, elevation 133 m (436 ft), (1991−2020 normals, extremes 1976−present)
Month	Jan	Feb	Mar	Apr	May	Jun	Jul	Aug	Sep	Oct	Nov	Dec	Year
Record high °C (°F)	12.3 (54.1)	15.9 (60.6)	20.9 (69.6)	29.5 (85.1)	33.0 (91.4)	34.8 (94.6)	36.2 (97.2)	36.7 (98.1)	34.7 (94.5)	29.1 (84.4)	25.7 (78.3)	19.0 (66.2)	36.7 (98.1)
Mean daily maximum °C (°F)	2.1 (35.8)	3.1 (37.6)	7.5 (45.5)	15.2 (59.4)	21.6 (70.9)	24.9 (76.8)	27.9 (82.2)	29.5 (85.1)	25.0 (77.0)	18.6 (65.5)	11.7 (53.1)	5.0 (41.0)	16.0 (60.8)
Daily mean °C (°F)	−1.3 (29.7)	−1.0 (30.2)	2.3 (36.1)	8.5 (47.3)	14.7 (58.5)	19.0 (66.2)	22.7 (72.9)	23.7 (74.7)	19.4 (66.9)	12.7 (54.9)	6.4 (43.5)	1.2 (34.2)	10.7 (51.3)
Mean daily minimum °C (°F)	−4.7 (23.5)	−4.9 (23.2)	−2.3 (27.9)	2.2 (36.0)	8.1 (46.6)	13.9 (57.0)	18.6 (65.5)	19.3 (66.7)	14.9 (58.8)	7.8 (46.0)	1.9 (35.4)	−2.0 (28.4)	6.1 (42.9)
Record low °C (°F)	−15.4 (4.3)	−16.2 (2.8)	−13.6 (7.5)	−6.9 (19.6)	−1.0 (30.2)	4.4 (39.9)	8.5 (47.3)	10.3 (50.5)	3.8 (38.8)	−2.1 (28.2)	−7.5 (18.5)	−16.3 (2.7)	−16.3 (2.7)
Average precipitation mm (inches)	135.0 (5.31)	93.1 (3.67)	88.8 (3.50)	69.5 (2.74)	78.2 (3.08)	115.4 (4.54)	197.2 (7.76)	140.1 (5.52)	118.3 (4.66)	107.2 (4.22)	117.8 (4.64)	150.2 (5.91)	1,410.6 (55.54)
Average snowfall cm (inches)	227 (89)	185 (73)	85 (33)	3 (1.2)	0 (0)	0 (0)	0 (0)	0 (0)	0 (0)	0 (0)	3 (1.2)	116 (46)	613 (241)
Average extreme snow depth cm (inches)	62 (24)	76 (30)	49 (19)	3 (1.2)	0 (0)	0 (0)	0 (0)	0 (0)	0 (0)	0 (0)	2 (0.8)	35 (14)	77 (30)
Average precipitation days (≥ 1.0 mm)	21.5	17.1	15.3	11.3	9.7	10.0	13.5	10.9	11.1	11.8	15.1	19.9	167.2
Average snowy days (≥ 3 cm)	20.8	18.7	10.2	0.5	0	0	0	0	0	0	0.4	10.0	60.6
Mean monthly sunshine hours	64.0	83.0	139.0	185.1	203.3	167.2	147.6	182.1	138.8	131.0	101.1	63.0	1,609.5
Source: Japan Meteorological Agency

== Demographics ==
Per Japanese census data, the population of Ōe has declined by more than half from its peak around 1950. It is now smaller than it was a century ago.

Historical population
Year	Pop.	±%
1920	12,619	—
1930	13,879	+10.0%
1940	13,987	+0.8%
1950	17,159	+22.7%
1960	15,819	−7.8%
1970	13,126	−17.0%
1980	11,374	−13.3%
1990	10,724	−5.7%
2000	10,477	−2.3%
2010	9,227	−11.9%
2020	7,646	−17.1%

== History ==
The area of present-day Ōe was part of ancient Dewa Province. During the Kamakura period it was controlled by the Ōe clan. During the early Edo period, it was the site of a castle and center of the briefly-lived Aterazawa Domain (12,000 koku), which was absorbed into Tsuruoka Domain. After the start of the Meiji period, the area became part of Nishimurayama District, Yamagata Prefecture. The village of Aterizawa was established on April 1, 1889, with the establishment of the modern municipalities system. The town of Ōe was established on August 20, 1959, by the merger of the town of Aterazawa and the village of Urushikawa.

== Economy ==
The economy of Ōe is based on agriculture.

== Education ==
Ōe has two public elementary schools and one public middle school operated by the Town government and one public high school operated by the Yamagata Prefectural Board of Education.

== Transportation ==
=== Railway ===
East Japan Railway Company - Aterazawa Line

- Aterazawa

=== Highway ===
- National Route 287
- National Route 458

== Local attractions ==
=== Events ===
- Oe Doll's Festival (March)
- Mogami River rower's song contest (June)

=== Landmarks ===
- Tateyama Park (ruins of Tateyama Castle)
- Yanagawa spa
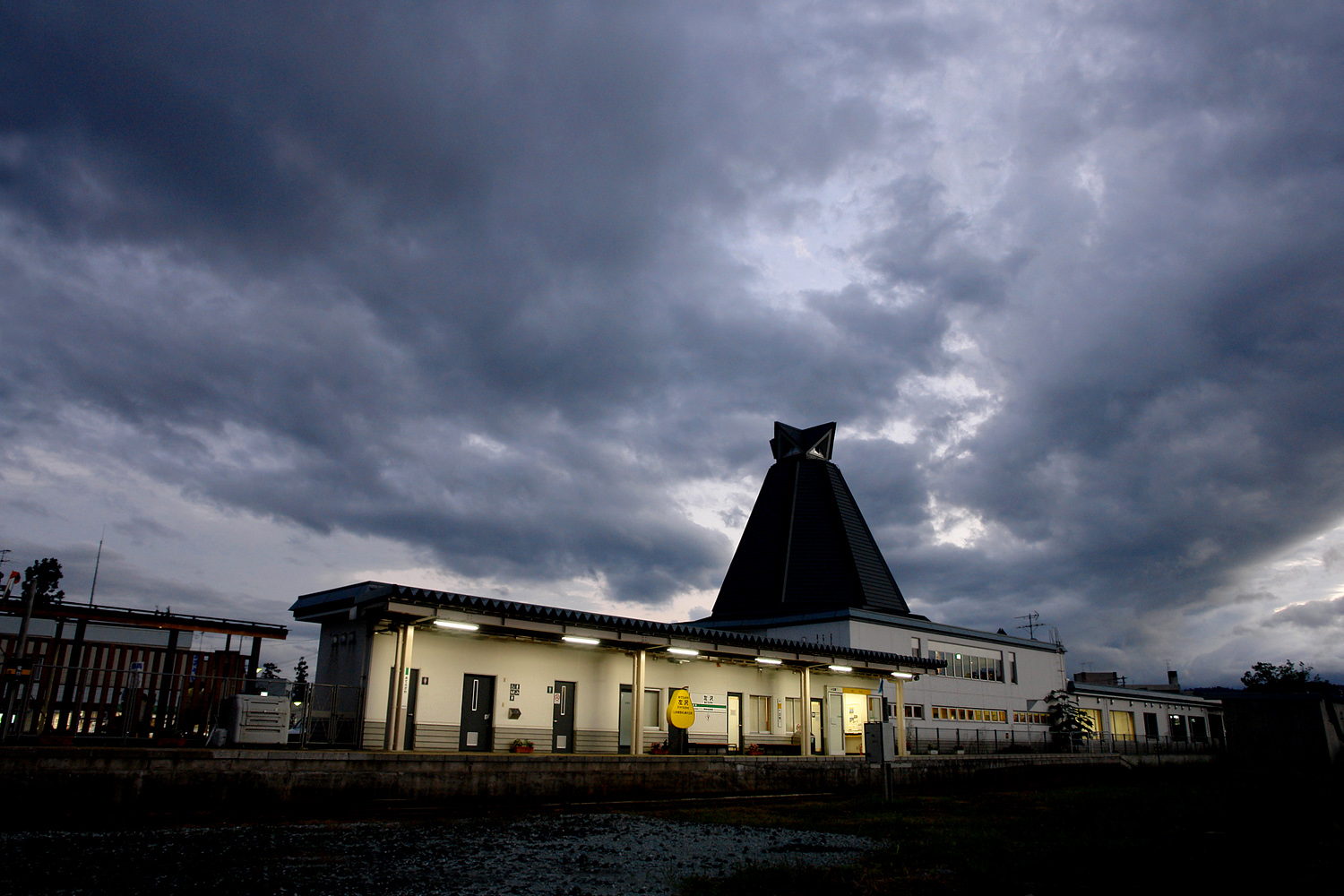
Aterazawa Station

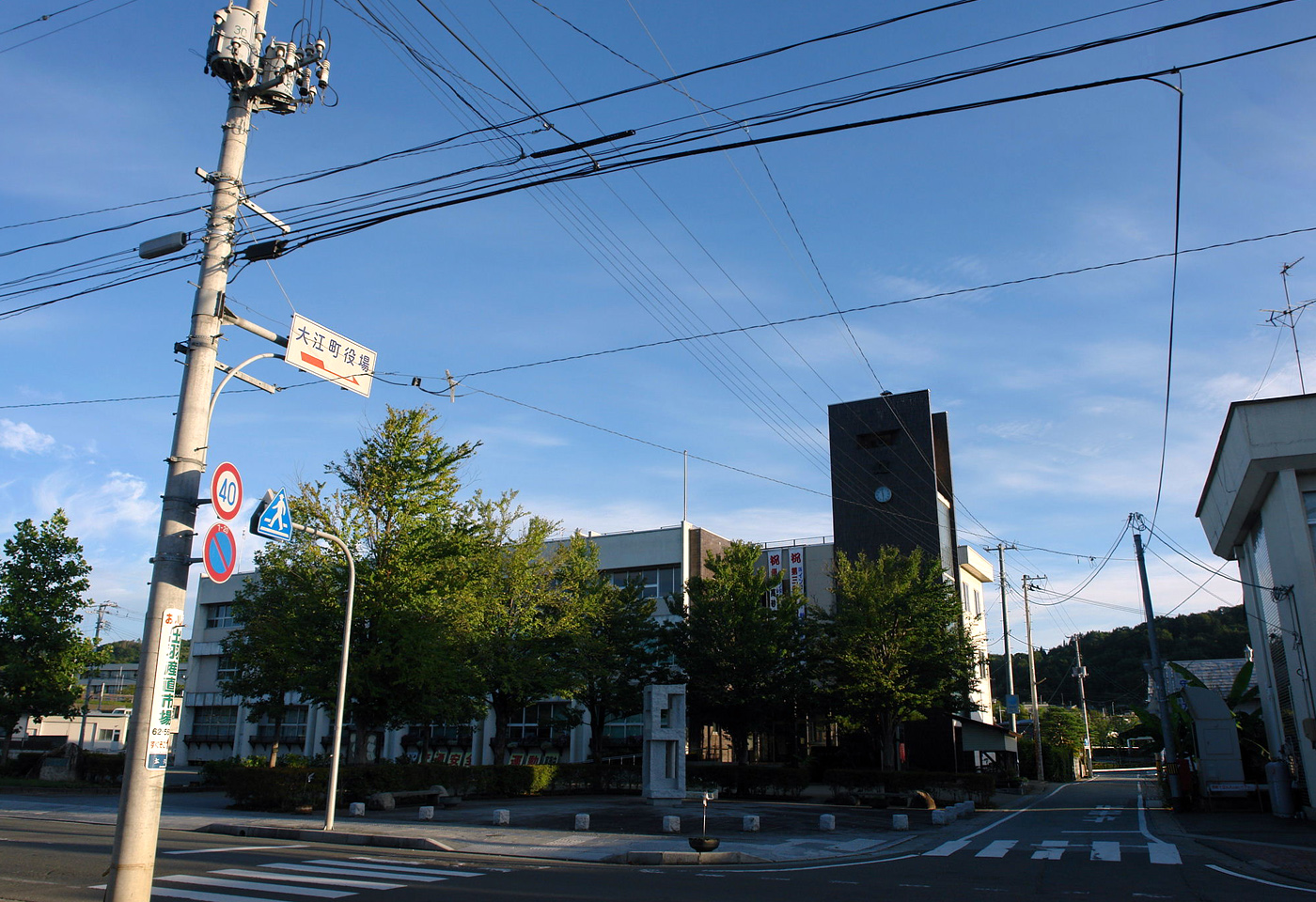
Oe Office

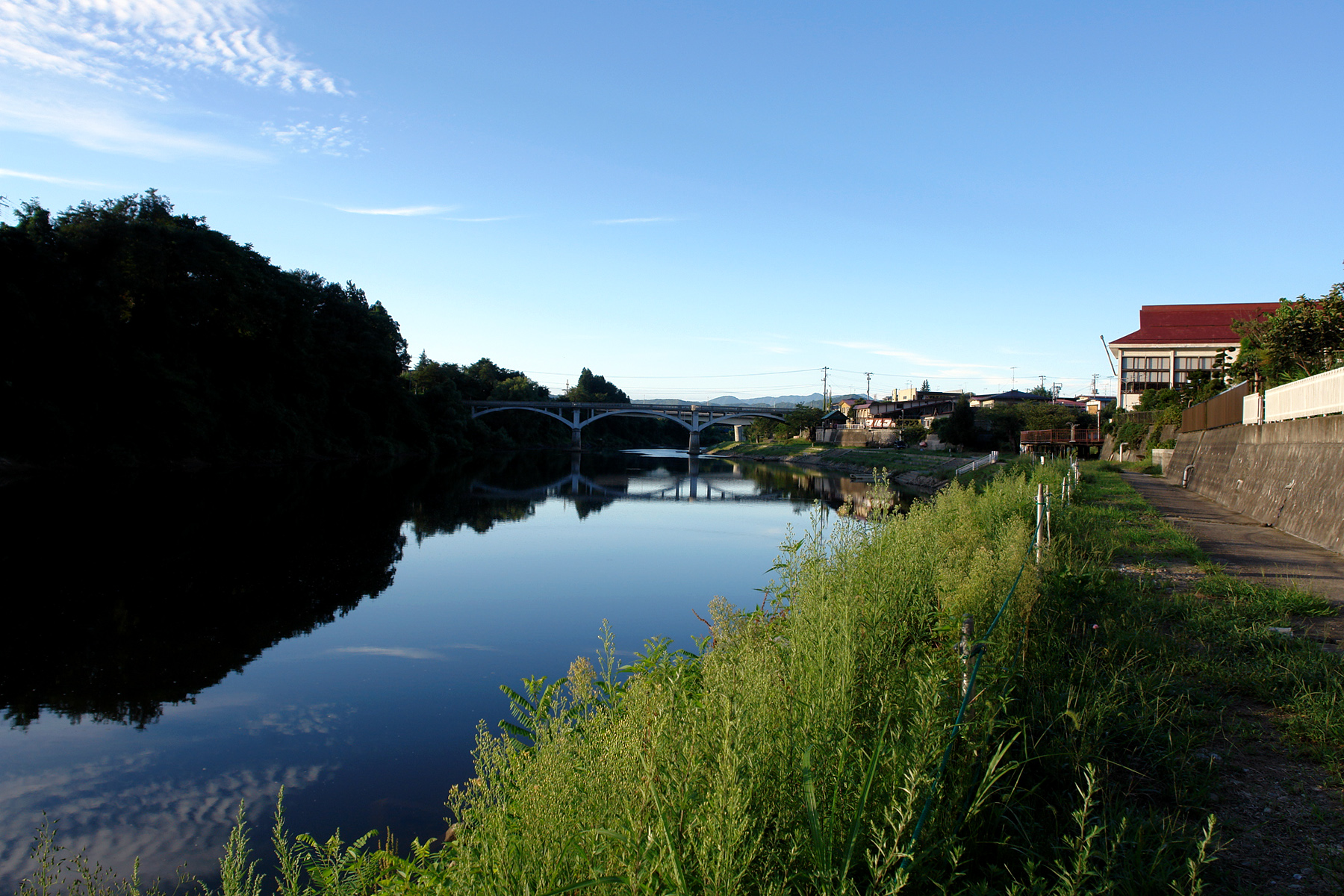
Mogami River

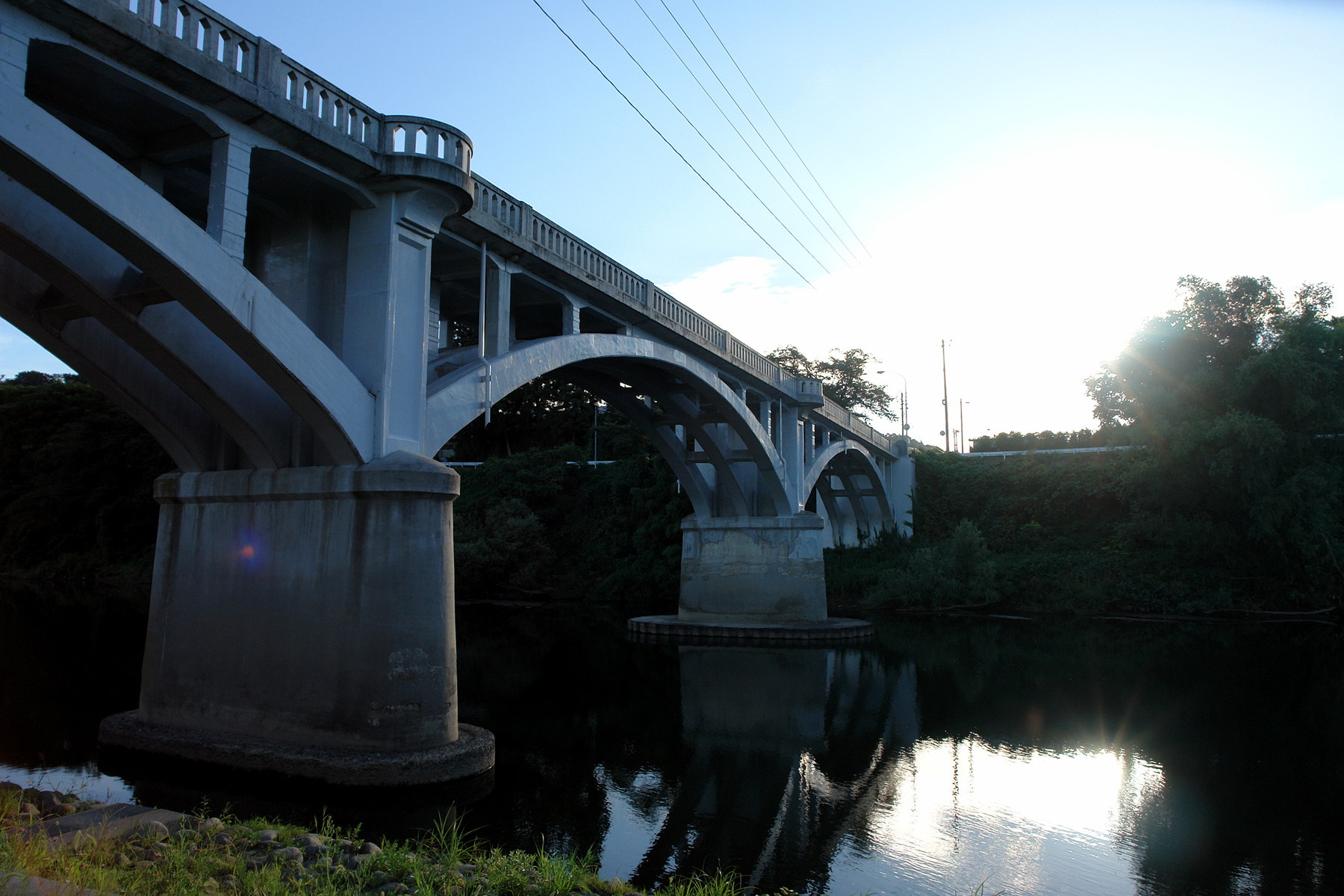
Mogami Bridge

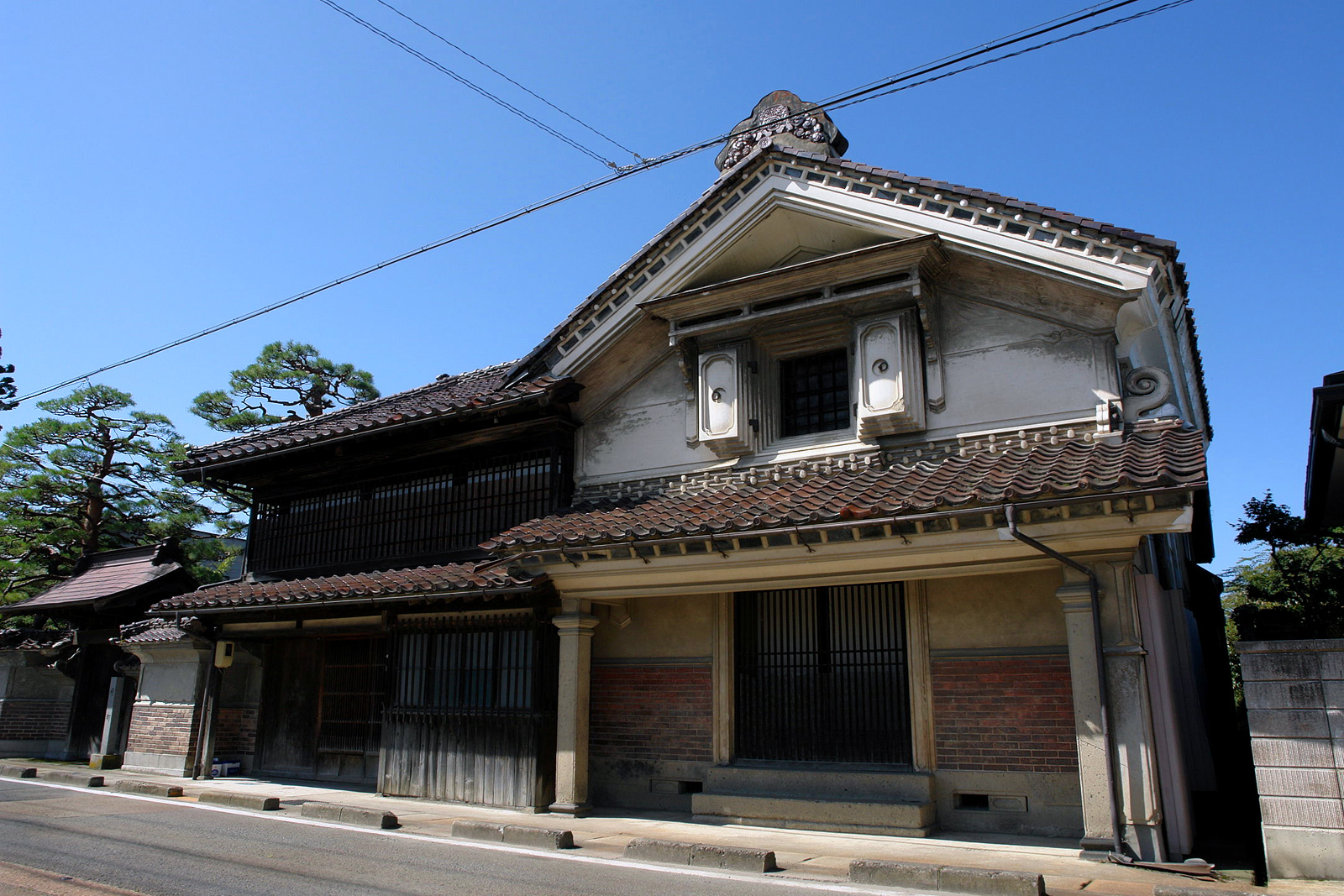
Aterazawa Haramachi

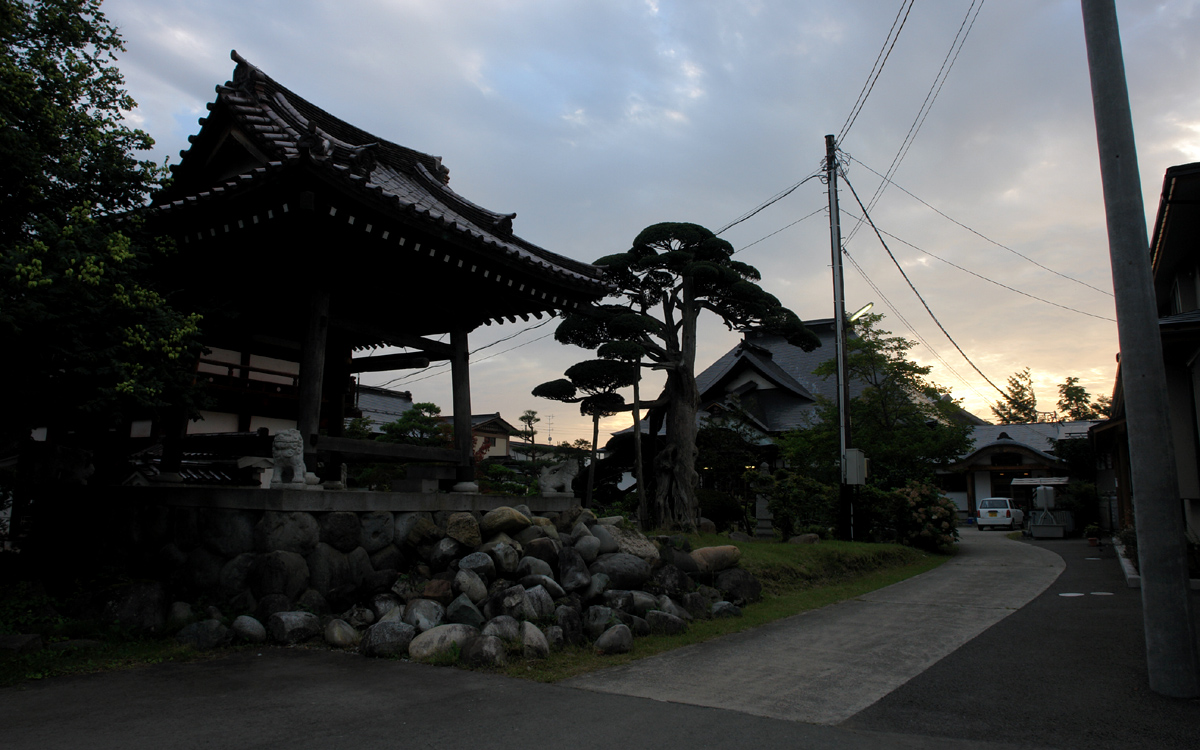
Kokai-in Temple

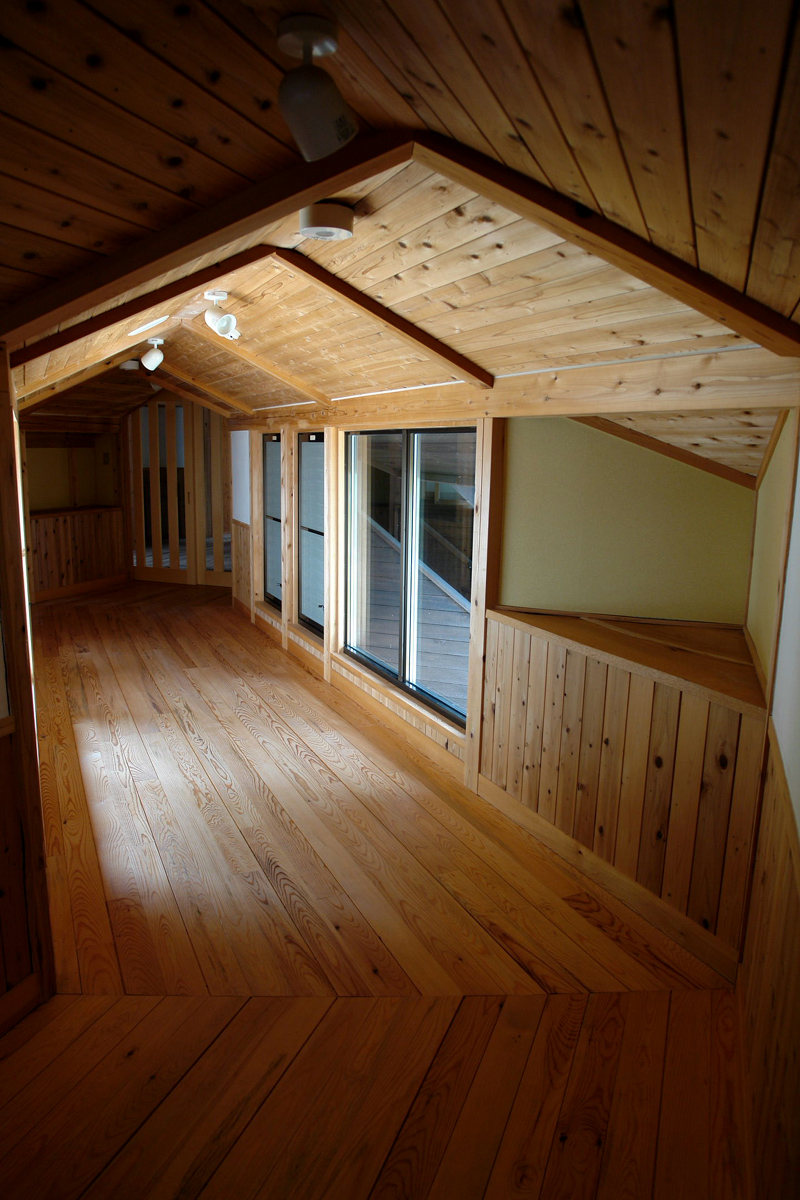
Yanagawa spa

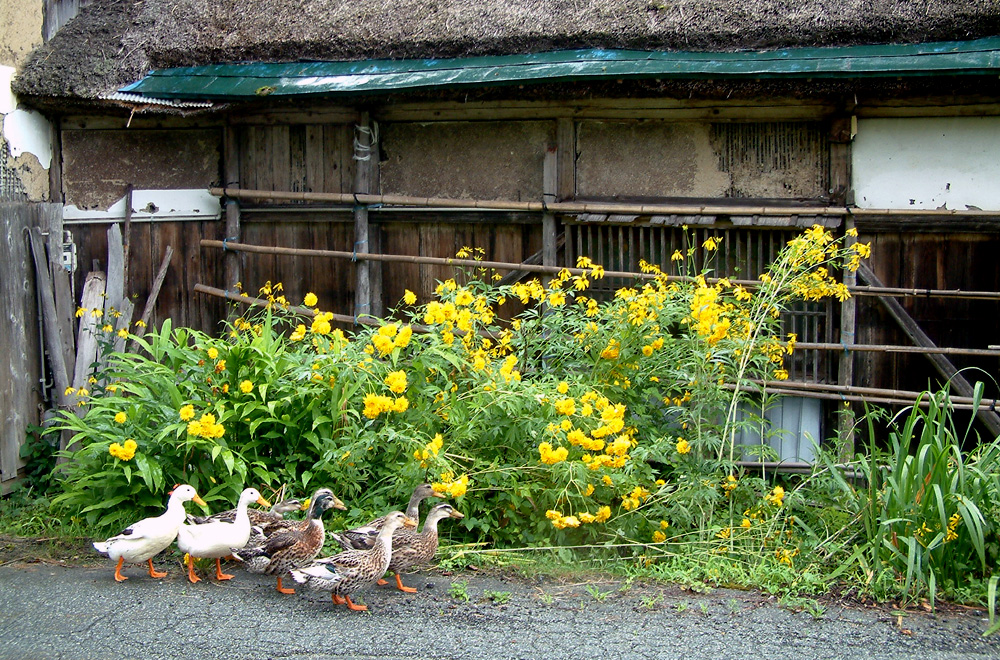
Duck family
