= Mount Asahi (Yamagata) =

Mountain in Japan

- 朝日岳
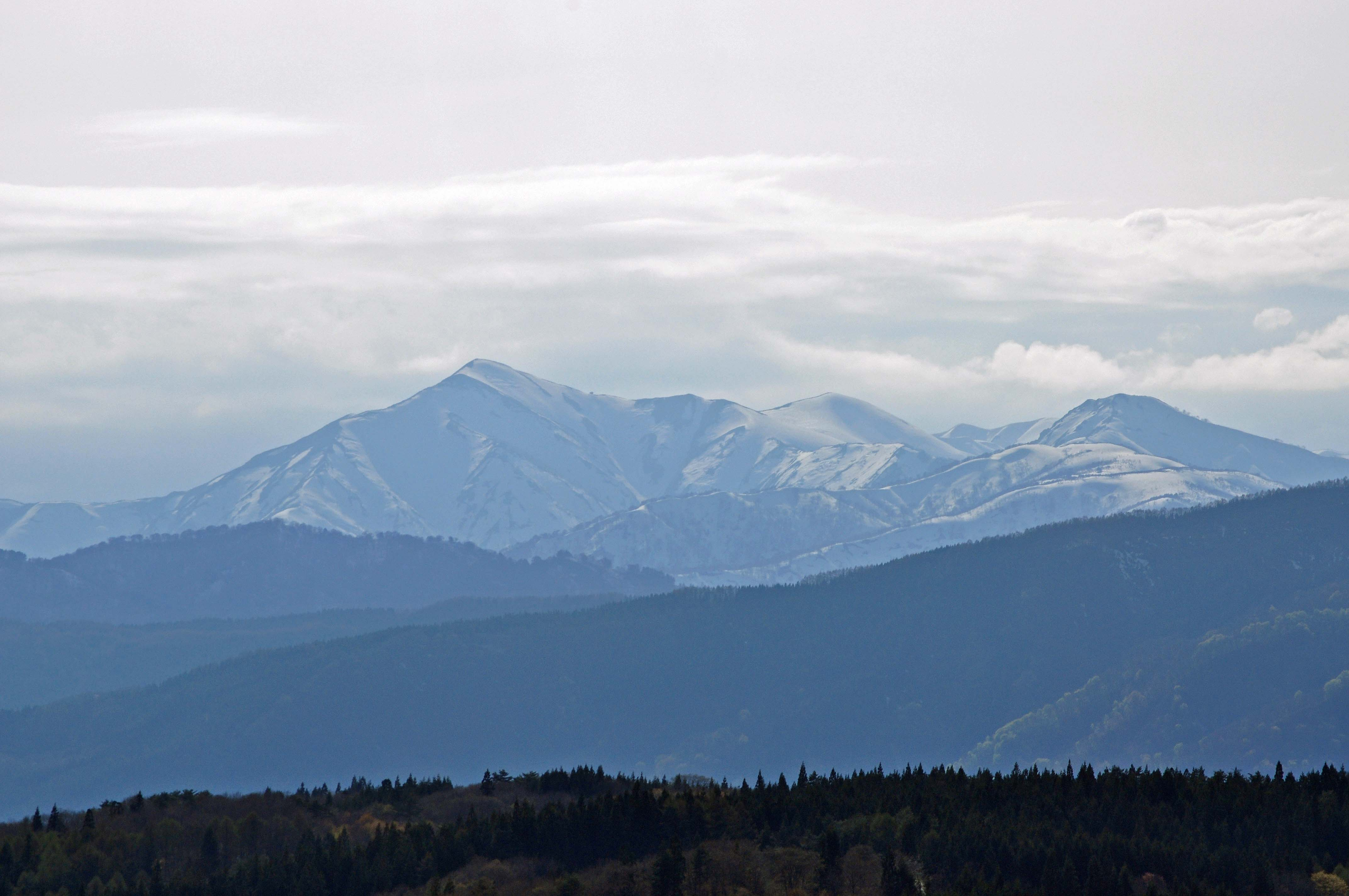
- Ō-Asahidake

Highest point
- Elevation: 1,870 m (6,140 ft)
- Listing: 100 Famous Japanese Mountains
- Coordinates: 38°15′38″N 139°55′20″E

Naming
- English translation: Mount Rising Run
- Language of name: Japanese

Geography
- Location within Yamagata Prefecture
- Location: Yamagata, Tōhoku, Japan
- Parent range: Asahi Mountains

Climbing
- First ascent: Ridge
- Easiest route: Hiking

Mount Asahi (朝日岳, Asahidake) is a mountain located on the border of Yamagata Prefecture with Niigata Prefecture, in northern Japan. It is part of the Asahi Mountain Range, which is part of Bandai-Asahi National Park. The mountain has a peak Ō-Asahidake (大朝日岳) with a height of 1,870 metres (6,140 ft) which is wholly within Yamagata Prefecture, and a secondary peak Ko-Asahidake (小朝日岳) with a height of 1,648 metres (5,407 ft) to the northeast. Another peak in the same range, Nishi-Asahidake (西朝日岳) to the northwest has a height of 1,814 metres (5,951 ft).

It is one of the mountains described in Kyūya Fukada's book 100 Famous Japanese Mountains.
