= Ōe (surname) =

Ōe, Oe or Ooe (written: 大江 lit. "large bay") is a Japanese surname. Notable people with the surname include:

- Ōe no Chisato, Japanese waka poet
- Hikari Ōe (大江 光, born 1963), the son of Kenzaburō Ōe
- Princess Ōe (大江皇女, died 699), princess of ancient Japan
- Hideo Oe (大江 英雄, born 1944), Japanese rower
- Hikaru Ōe (大江 光, born 1995), Japanese snowboarder
- Kenzaburō Ōe (大江 健三郎, 1935–2023), Japanese novelist
- Momoe Oe (大江 百重, born 1980), Japanese professional wrestler
- Senri Oe (大江 千里, born 1960), Japanese singer-songwriter
- Takamasa Oe (大江 崇允, born 1981), Japanese screenwriter
- Tatsuya Oe (オオエ タツヤ, born 1969), Japanese electronic musician known as Captain Funk
