= Stanhope C. Ring =

United States Navy admiral (1902–1963)

Stanhope Cotton Ring
- Rear admiral Stanhope C. Ring
- Born: October 13, 1902; Norfolk, Virginia, U.S.
- Died: May 25, 1963 (aged 60); San Diego, California, U.S.
- Military career
- Allegiance: United States of America
- Branch: United States Navy
- Service years: 1923–1955
- Rank: Vice admiral
- Commands: Hornet Air Group; USS Siboney (CVE-112); USS Saratoga (CV-3); USS Boxer (CV-21); Naval Operating Base, Kwajalein; Carrier Division One
- Conflicts: World War II: Doolittle Raid; Battle of Midway; Solomon Islands campaign
- Awards: Navy Cross; Legion of Merit

Stanhope Cotton Ring (October 13, 1902 – May 25, 1963) was a United States Navy officer and naval aviator who commanded the air group of the aircraft carrier USS Hornet at the Battle of Midway in June 1942. During the battle, he led Hornet's strike on a course that missed the Japanese carriers, and the episode, sometimes called the "flight to nowhere", is still debated by historians. He received the Navy Cross for his part in the battle.

After the war, Ring commanded the carriers USS Saratoga and USS Boxer, and he retired as a vice admiral in 1955.

== Early life and education ==
Ring was born in 1902 in Norfolk, Virginia, into a naval family. Ring graduated from the United States Naval Academy in 1923 and trained as a naval aviator at Pensacola. He received his wings in 1926 as a naval aviator.

== Military career ==
Ring's first squadron was Fighting Squadron Five, which was attached to the aircraft tender Wright. He later served as aide to Rear Admiral William A. Moffett, the first chief of the Bureau of Aeronautics, and as a naval aide at the White House. In September 1932, he married Eleanor Reynolds of Coronado, California. Five days after the wedding, while flying with Fighting Squadron 3B, he survived an aviation accident when his plane caught fire over San Diego. He also played a key role in recommending leather gloves as part of mandatory flight equipment for naval aviators after discovering it can help in controlling the aircraft. Ring took part in the early development of naval dive-bombing tactics, flying from the carrier Langley and serving on staffs aboard Saratoga. He later commanded Fighting Squadron 3 and headed the Administration Division of the Bureau of Aeronautics. He then became executive officer of Patrol Squadron 17, and he rose to command it during operations in Alaska in 1938 and 1939.

Ring was then sent to the United Kingdom as an assistant naval attaché and as a naval observer aboard the British carrier HMS Ark Royal. One of his main tasks aboard Ark Royal was to assess the Royal Navy's use of radar in combat.

=== World War II ===
Ring became commander of the air group of the new carrier Hornet. The ship was commissioned at Norfolk on October 20, 1941, under Captain Marc Mitscher. In April 1942, Hornet carried Lieutenant Colonel Jimmy Doolittle's B-25 bombers toward Japan for the Doolittle Raid, and launched them on April 18.

==== Battle of Midway ====
On June 4, 1942, during the Battle of Midway, Ring led Hornet's strike against the Japanese carriers, a force of 10 fighters, 35 SBD Dauntless dive bombers and 14 TBD Devastator torpedo bombers. Although he was senior to the air group commanders of Enterprise and Yorktown, he was the least seasoned of them and had no combat experience. With Mitscher's concurrence, Ring took the strike on a course well north of the reported Japanese position. The historian Craig L. Symonds has argued that the group probably flew a heading of about 265 degrees, rather than the 239 degrees given in Mitscher's report.

About 15 minutes into the flight, Lieutenant Commander John C. Waldron of Torpedo Squadron 8 challenged the course over the radio. Ring replied, "I'm leading this flight", but Waldron left the formation with his squadron and headed southwest. Torpedo Squadron 8 found the Japanese carriers and attacked them, but all 15 TBDs were shot down by Japanese fighters, with only one pilot surviving. Ring continued west even after Waldron radioed that he had made contact with the Japanese, and even after his fighters had passed the point of no return. The fighters turned back without permission, and all ten ran out of fuel and ditched, and two of their pilots were never recovered. The commander of Bombing Squadron 8 also broke away to search for the enemy but missed them, and of his aircraft, three returned to Hornet, two ditched and eleven landed on Midway. The flight became known as the "flight to nowhere".

At 9:40 a.m., the commander of Scouting Squadron 8 turned back toward Hornet, followed by Ring's two wingmen, and Ring briefly flew on alone before he too returned to the carrier. None of the aircraft of Hornet's morning strike sighted the Japanese carriers. According to Symonds, 20 of the 59 aircraft that launched returned to Hornet, and none of them had dropped a bomb on an enemy ship.

On June 6, Ring led Hornet's first strike, of 14 SBDs, against the Japanese heavy cruisers Mogami and Mikuma. He first flew past the cruisers in search of a battleship that did not exist, before he reversed course and attacked them. The cruisers shot down two of the SBDs, and the strike hit Mogami twice. Ring received the Navy Cross for his part in the battle, and Admiral Chester W. Nimitz presented it to him personally.

Mitscher's report of June 13, 1942, was the only report that Hornet submitted on the battle, and none of its squadrons filed a separate report, contrary to standard procedure. The report said that the air group had flown southwest toward the reported Japanese position, and it did not mention that Ring had nearly run the group out of fuel. Samuel J. Cox, the director of the Naval History and Heritage Command, has written that Mitscher and Ring may have falsified the report. Symonds has argued that Mitscher probably filed a report that he knew to be false, partly to protect Waldron's reputation and to avoid charges against the squadron commanders who had left the formation. The "flight to nowhere" account remains disputed. Ring's wingman maintained until his death that the group had flown southwest. In 2019, Cox also noted reports by two Hornet fighter pilots who said that they had seen Kure Atoll during the flight, which would argue against the "flight to nowhere" account.

In 1999, the naval historian Bruce Linder published a 22-page handwritten account of the battle that Ring had written on March 28, 1946, and that his family had found in a sea chest. In it, Ring wrote that he had assumed the enemy was closing on Midway, and that his "change of Air Group course to the south was based entirely on my estimate of the situation". He wrote that the group flew south until it sighted smoke from Midway, and that Enterprise and Hornet had been on different codes for their YE homing beacons. He also wrote that on his return flight alone, he dropped from 20,000 feet (6,100 m) to 10,000 feet (3,000 m) as his oxygen supply failed. Cox has noted that Ring's account is not clear on which direction he really flew.

==== Post battle ====
After Midway, Mitscher requested Ring as his chief of staff at Patrol Wing Two, and later for his staff in the Solomon Islands. When Ring was selected for promotion, Mitscher presented him with his captain's shoulder boards. In the Solomons, Ring was deputy chief of staff to the commander, Air Solomons. He received a commendation for his part in planning the air attack over Bougainville that killed Admiral Isoroku Yamamoto. In 1943, he became Director of Aviation Training under the Deputy Chief of Naval Operations (Air). Ring was the first commanding officer of the escort carrier Siboney, which was commissioned on May 14, 1945.

=== Post war ===
Following World War II, Ring took command of Saratoga on March 6, 1946. The carrier was assigned to the atomic tests of Operation Crossroads at Bikini Atoll, and was sunk by the underwater blast on July 25, 1946. He later commanded the new Essex-class carrier Boxer. Ring was promoted to rear admiral in 1949, and his first assignment was at Kwajalein, where he commanded the Naval Operating Base. In that post, he also served as acting military governor of the Marshall Islands. He was later deputy chief of staff to the commander-in-chief of Allied Forces Southern Europe in Naples, commander of Carrier Division One, and vice commander of the Military Air Transport Service. He retired from the Navy in November 1955 with the rank of vice admiral.

== Personal life and death ==
Ring and his wife Eleanor had three children, all of whom were born in Coronado. Their son, Stewart A. Ring, became a rear admiral and served as director of plans and policy for the United States Pacific Command.

Ring died on May 25, 1963, in San Diego, at the age of 60.

== Awards ==
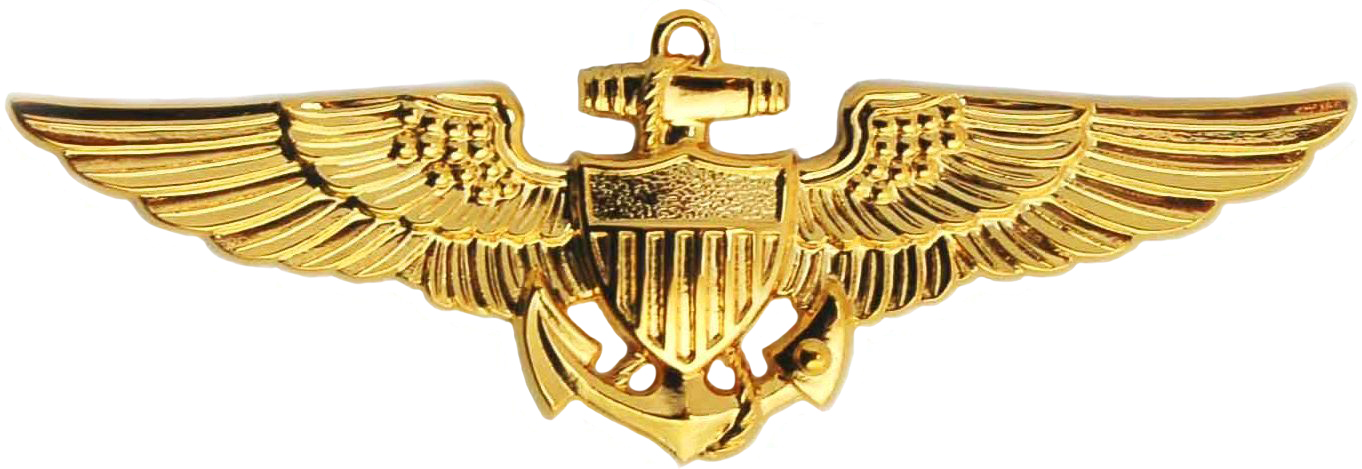

Naval Aviator Badge
Navy Cross	Legion of Merit	Navy Commendation Medal
American Defense Service Medal	American Campaign Medal	Asiatic-Pacific Campaign Medal w/ three 3/16" bronze stars
World War II Victory Medal	China Service Medal	Navy Occupation Service Medal w/ 'Asia' clasp
National Defense Service Medal	Navy Distinguished Marksman Ribbon	Commander of the Most Excellent Order of the British Empire

=== Navy Cross citation ===

Commander Stanhope Cotton Ring
U.S. Navy
Date Of Action: June 4, 1942

The President of the United States of America takes pleasure in presenting the Navy Cross to Commander Stanhope Cotton Ring, United States Navy, for extraordinary heroism in operations against the enemy while serving as Pilot of a carrier-based Navy Combat Plane and Group Commander of the HORNET Air Group, attached to the U.S.S. HORNET (CV-8), during the Battle of Midway on 6 June 1942. Commander Ring led his carrier air group against enemy cruisers and destroyers, coolly and methodically, in the face of heavy anti-aircraft fire. Without regard for his own safety, he drove home a successful attack on the enemy carriers. His outstanding courage and determined skill were at all times inspiring and in keeping with the highest traditions of the United States Naval Service.
