= Minami-Sagae Station =

Railway station in Sagae, Yamagata Prefecture, Japan

Minami-Sagae Station 南寒河江駅
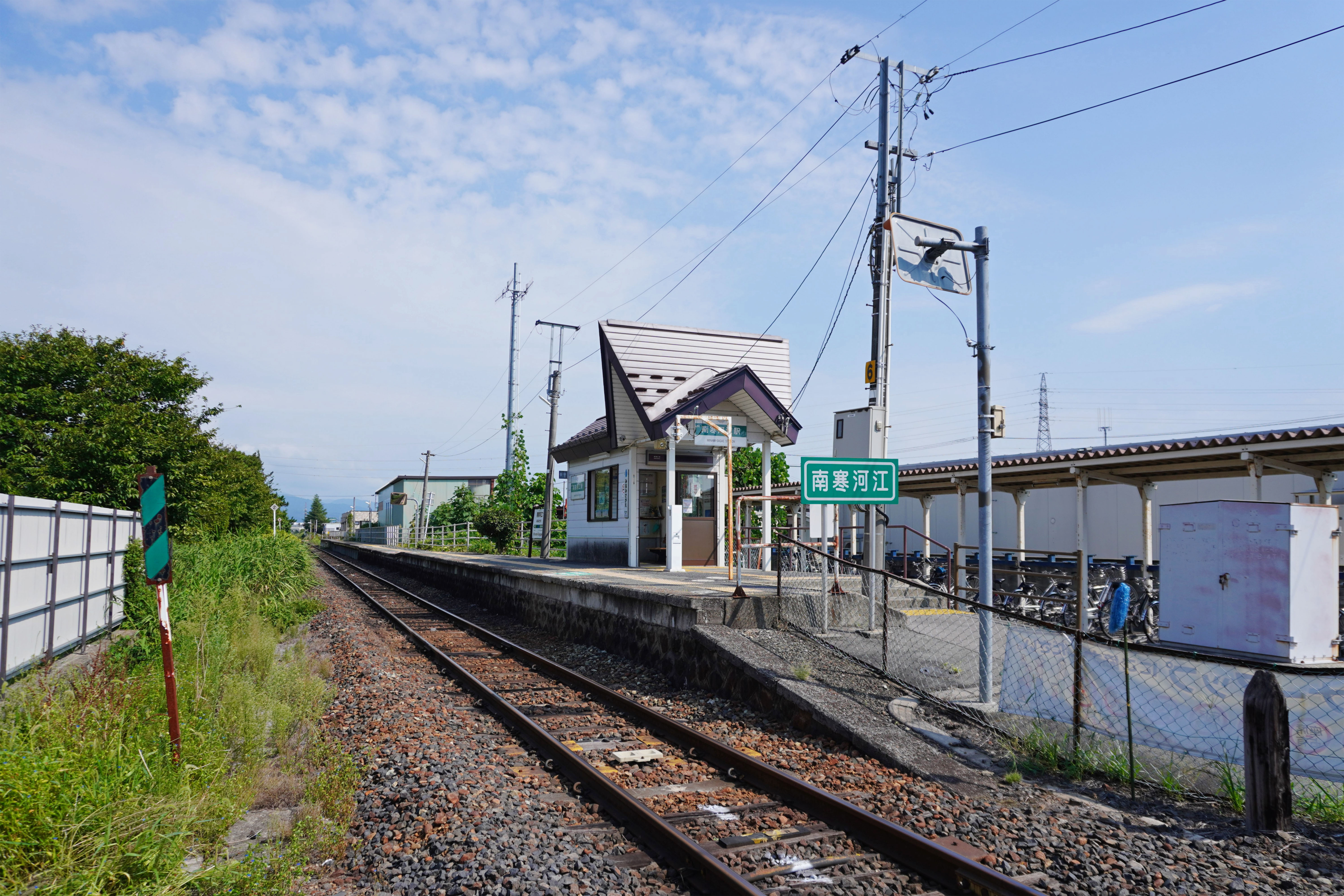
- Minami-Sagae Station in 2023

General information
- Location: Shimahigashi Shima, Sagae-shi, Yamagata-ken 991-0043; Japan
- Coordinates: 38°21′20″N 140°16′40″E
- Operator: JR East
- Line: Aterazawa Line
- Distance: 13.5 km (8.4 mi) from Kita-Yamagata
- Platforms: 1 side platform

Other information
- Status: Unstaffed
- Website: Official website

History
- Opened: 25 December 1951; 74 years ago

Passengers
- FY2004: 109

Services
Preceding station	JR East	Following station
Sagae towards Aterazawa	Aterazawa Line	Uzen-Nagasaki towards Yamagata
Route map
Location
- Location within Yamagata Prefecture Location within Japan

Minami-Sagae Station (南寒河江駅, Minami-Sagae eki) is a railway station located in the city of Sagae, Yamagata Prefecture, Japan, operated by the East Japan Railway Company (JR East).

== Lines ==
Minami-Sagae Station is served by the Aterazawa Line and is located 13.5 km (8.4 mi) from the start of the line at Kita-Yamagata, and 10.8 km (6.7 mi) from Aterazawa. The preceding station of Uzen-Nagasaki is 2.5 km (1.6 mi) away and the following station of Sagae is 1.8 km (1.1 mi) away.

== Station layout ==
The station has one side platform serving a single bi-directional track. The station is unattended. The station has no accessibility features.

=== Platforms ===
-	■ Aterazawa Line	for Yamagata
-	■ Aterazawa Line	for Aterazawa

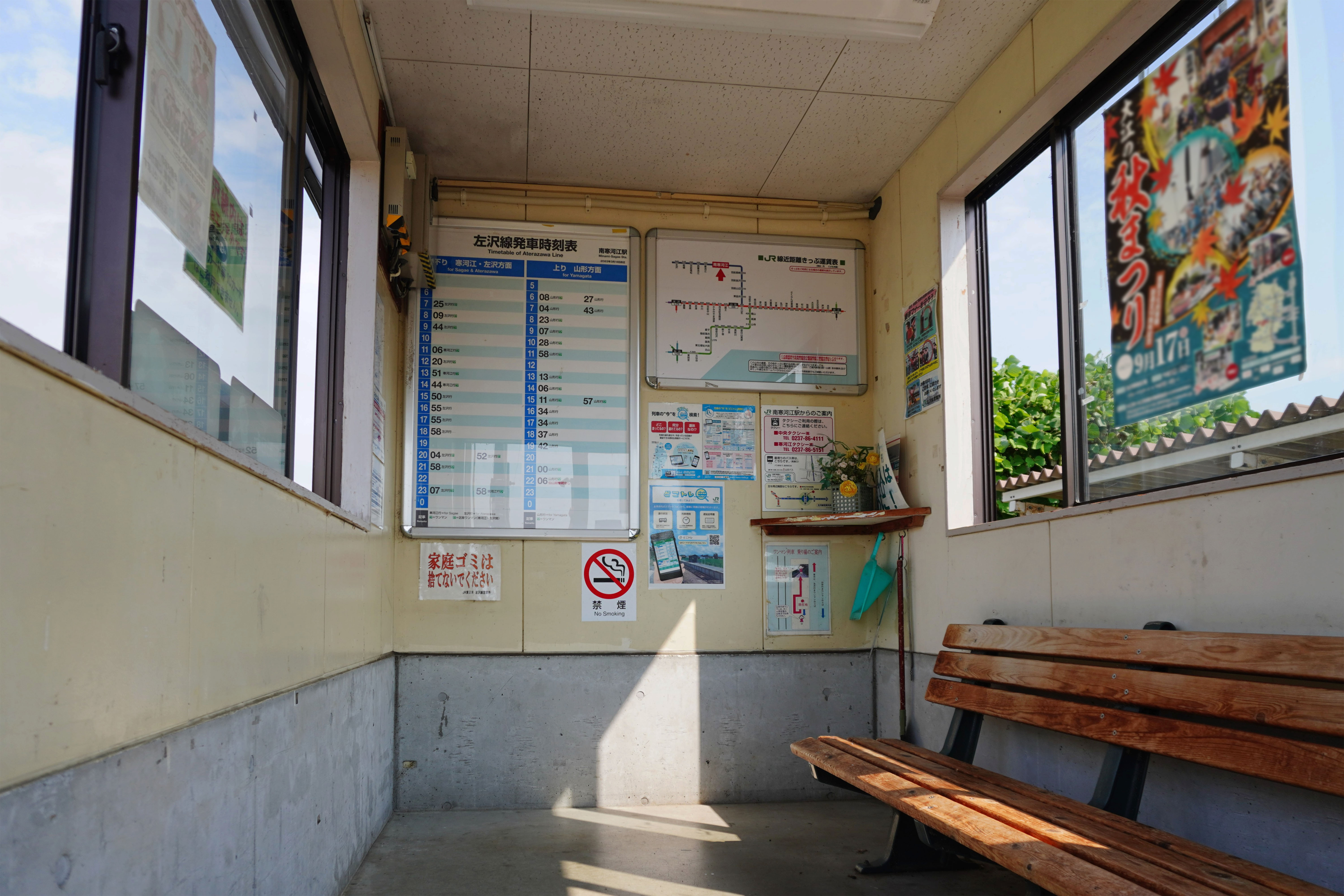
Waiting Room, September 2023

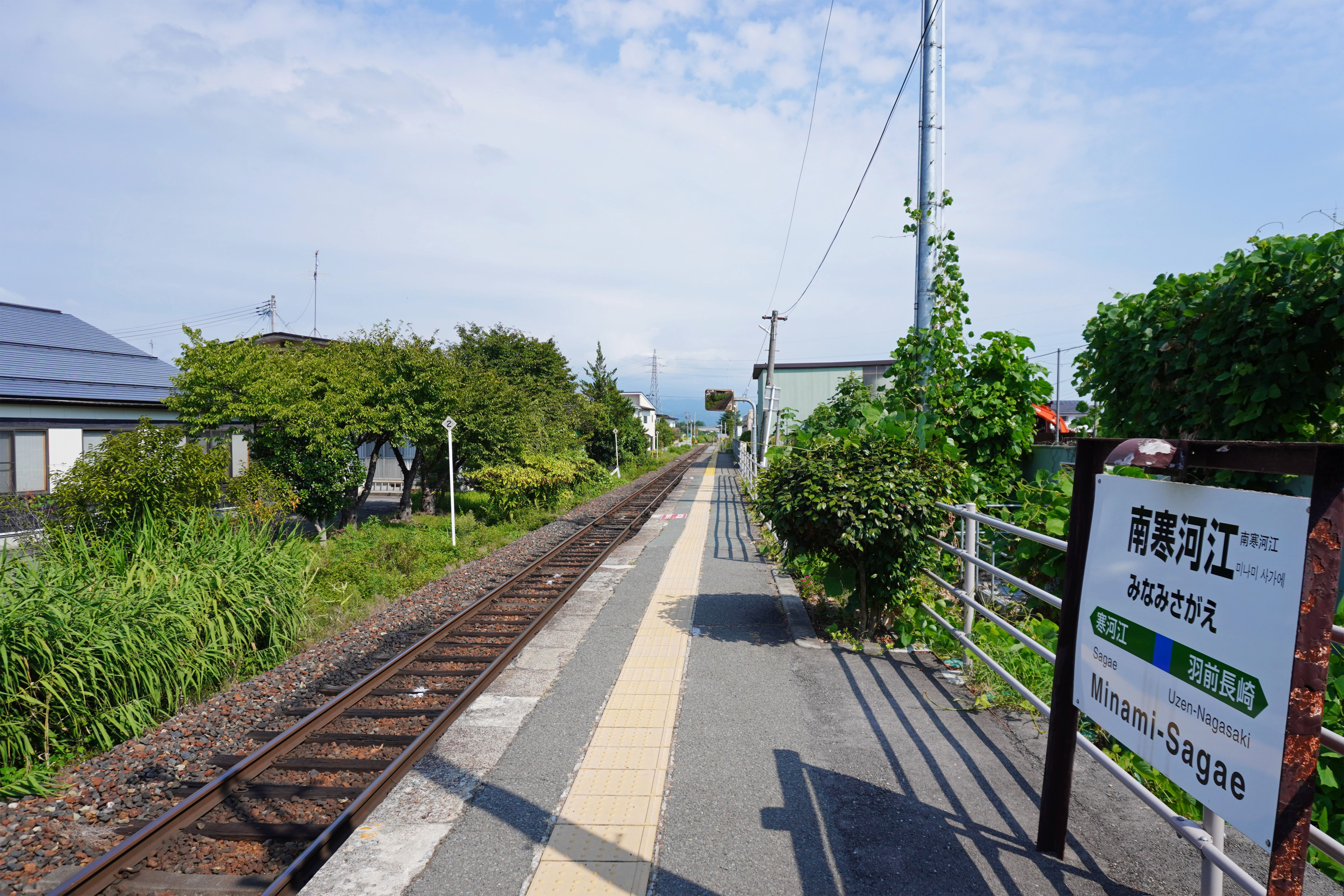
Platform, September 2023

== History ==
Minami-Sagae Station began operation on 25 December 1951 With the privatization of the JNR on April 1, 1987, the station came under the control of the East Japan Railway Company. In 2002, a waiting room was built.

The Station will start accepting Suica Cards in Spring 2024, with the extension of the Sendai area Suica zone to Yamagata Prefecture.

== Passenger statistics ==
In fiscal 2004, the station was used by an average of 109 passengers daily. Since 2005, Yamagata Prefecture has not reported the passenger numbers for Minami-Sagae Station.

Below is a table containing the passenger statistics from the year 2000 to the year 2004:

Passenger statistics
Year	Average Daily Passengers
2000	101
2001	101
2002	109
2003	107
2004	109

== Surrounding area ==
- Mogami River
- Sagae Shima Post Office

== See also ==
- List of railway stations in Japan
