= Japanese ship Mogami =

Four warships of Japan have been named Mogami, after the Mogami River in the Tohoku region of Honshū:

- Japanese cruiser Mogami (1908), a Yodo-class high speed cruiser that commissioned in 1908 and was scrapped in 1928.
- Japanese cruiser Mogami (1934), a Mogami-class heavy cruiser that commissioned in 1935 and scuttled in 1944 after the Battle of the Surigao Strait.
- JDS Mogami, an Isuzu-class destroyer escort launched in 1961 and stricken in 1991.
- JS Mogami, a Mogami-class frigate launched in 2021.
