= Uzen-Nagasaki Station =

Railway station in Nakayama, Yamagata Prefecture, Japan

Uzen-Nagasaki Station 羽前長崎駅
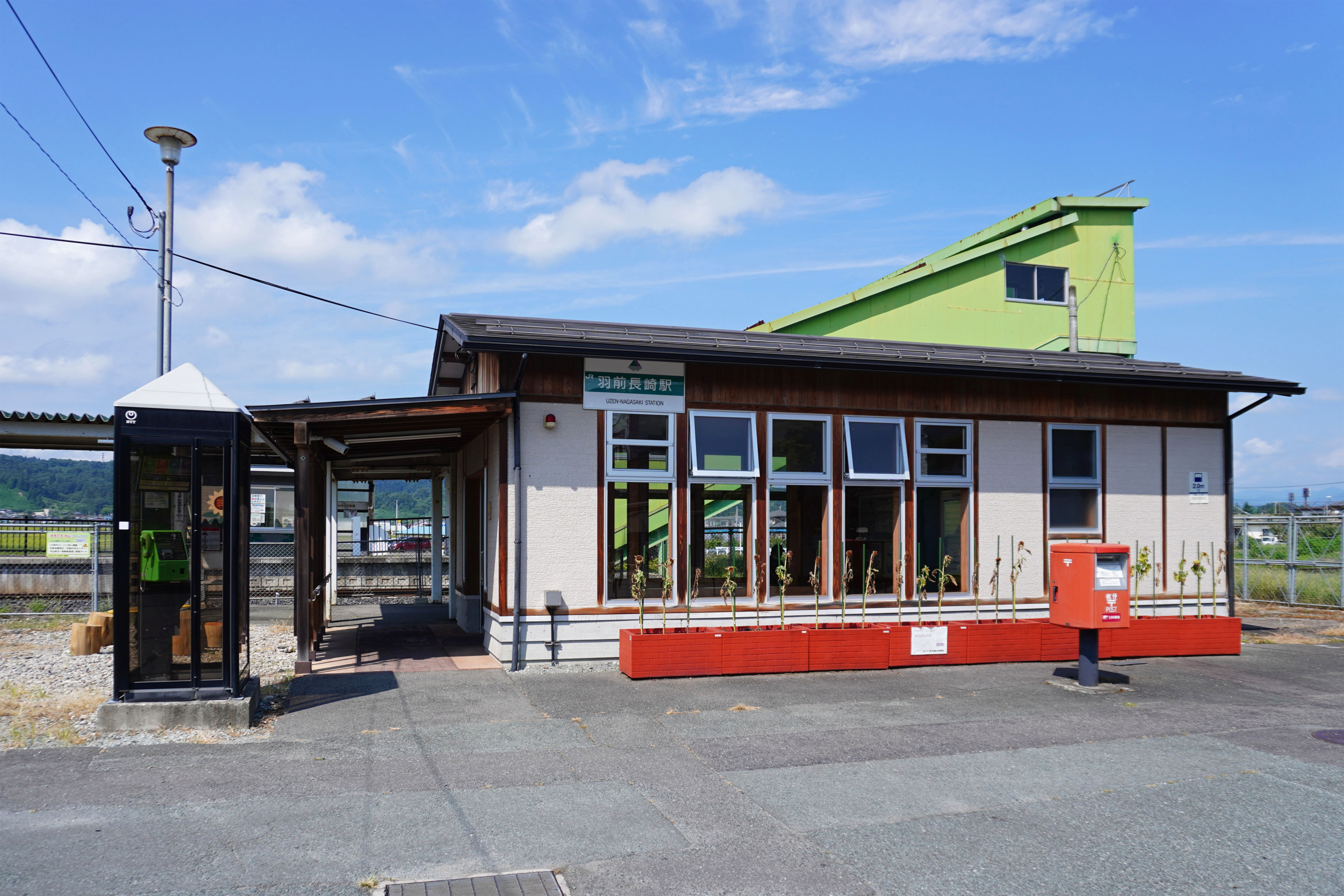
- Uzen-Nagasaki Station east exit in 2023

General information
- Location: 4206 Kanezawa, Nakayama-machi, Higashimurayama-gun, Yamagata-ken 990-0401; Japan
- Coordinates: 38°20′00″N 140°16′23″E
- Operator: JR East
- Line: Aterazawa Line
- Distance: 11 km (6.8 mi) from Kita-Yamagata
- Platforms: 1 island platform

Other information
- Status: Staffed
- Website: Official website

History
- Opened: 20 July 1921; 105 years ago

Passengers
- FY2022: 317

Services
Preceding station	JR East	Following station
Minami-Sagae towards Aterazawa	Aterazawa Line	Uzen-Kanezawa towards Yamagata
Route map
Location
- Location within Yamagata Prefecture Location within Japan

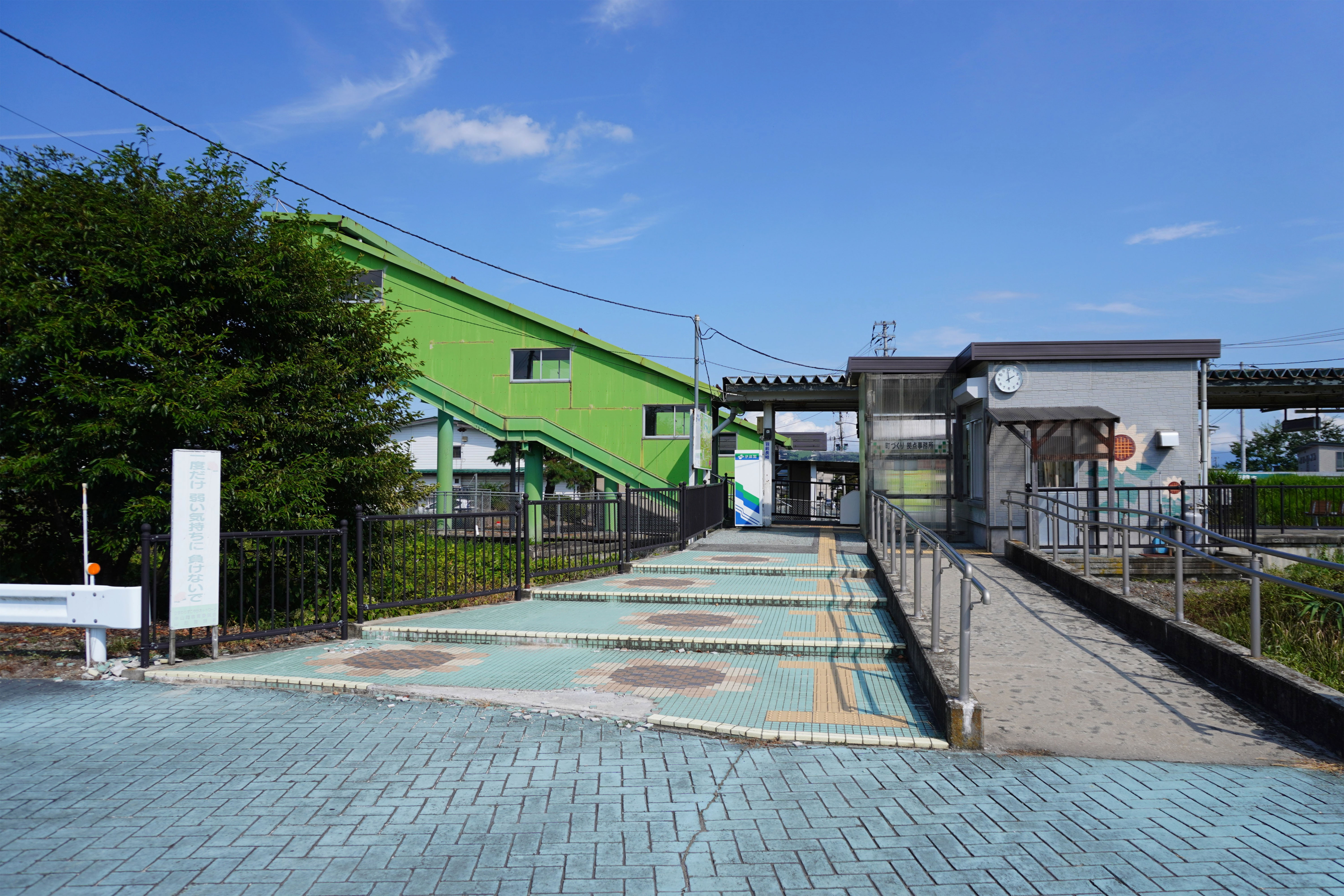
West Exit, September 2023

Uzen-Nagasaki Station (羽前長崎駅, Uzen-Nagasaki eki) is a railway station located in the town of Nakayama, Yamagata Prefecture, Japan, operated by the East Japan Railway Company (JR East).

== Lines ==
Uzen-Nagasaki Station is served by the Aterazawa Line and is located 11 km (6.8 mi) from the start of the line at Kita-Yamagata, and 13.3 km (8.3 mi) from Aterazawa. The preceding station of Uzen-Kanezawa is 1.5 km (0.93 mi) away and the following station of Minami-Sagae is 2.5 km (1.6 mi) away.

== Station layout ==
The station was built with a single island platforms connected to the station building by a footbridge. However, with the opening of the west exit in 2004, the tracks on the west wide of the platform were removed, making the station effectively a side platform with trains in both directions using the same side of the platform. The station is a staffed Kan'i itaku station. The station has no accessibility features.

=== Platforms ===
-	■ Aterazawa Line	for Yamagata
-	■ Aterazawa Line	for Aterazawa

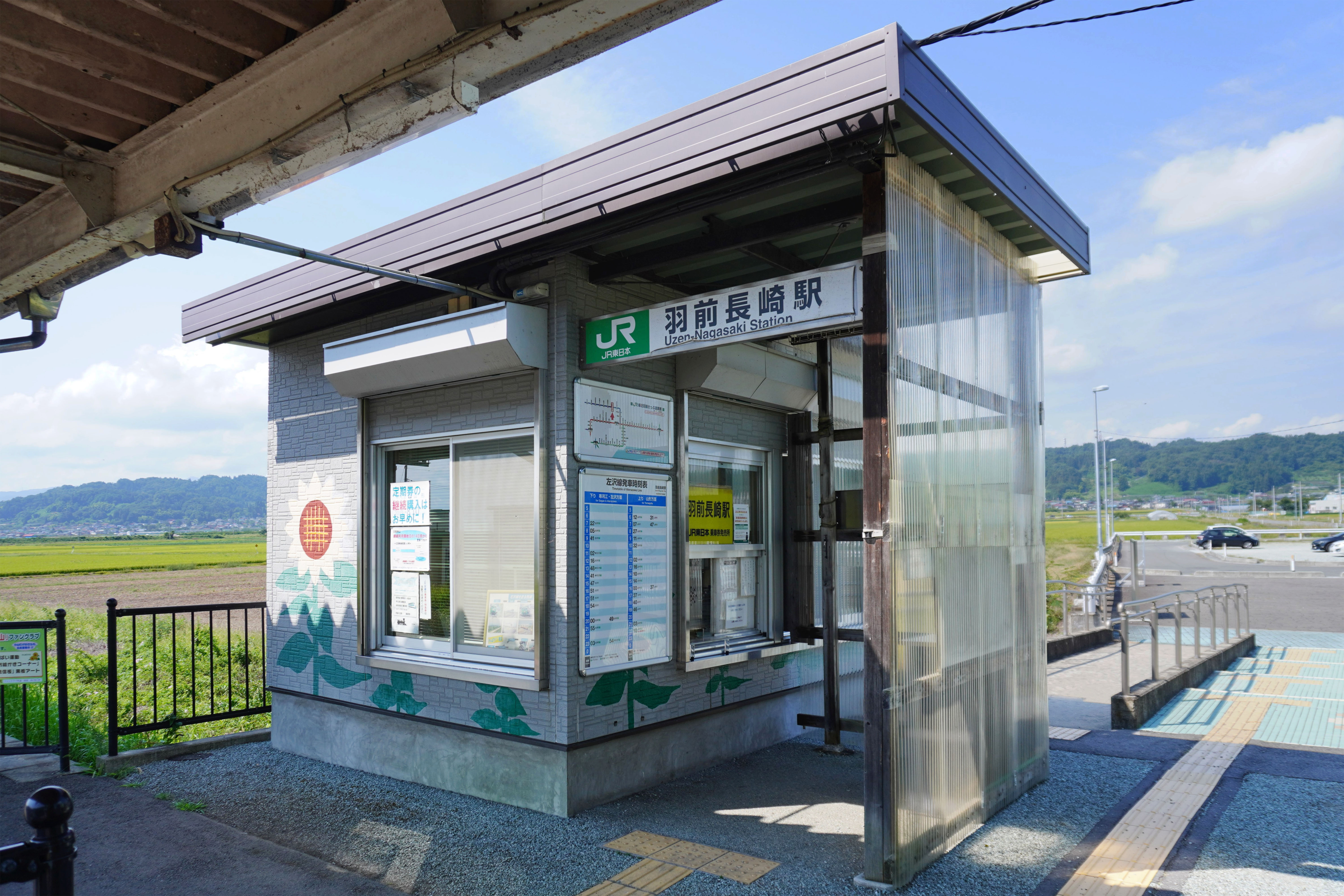
Ticket Office, September 2023

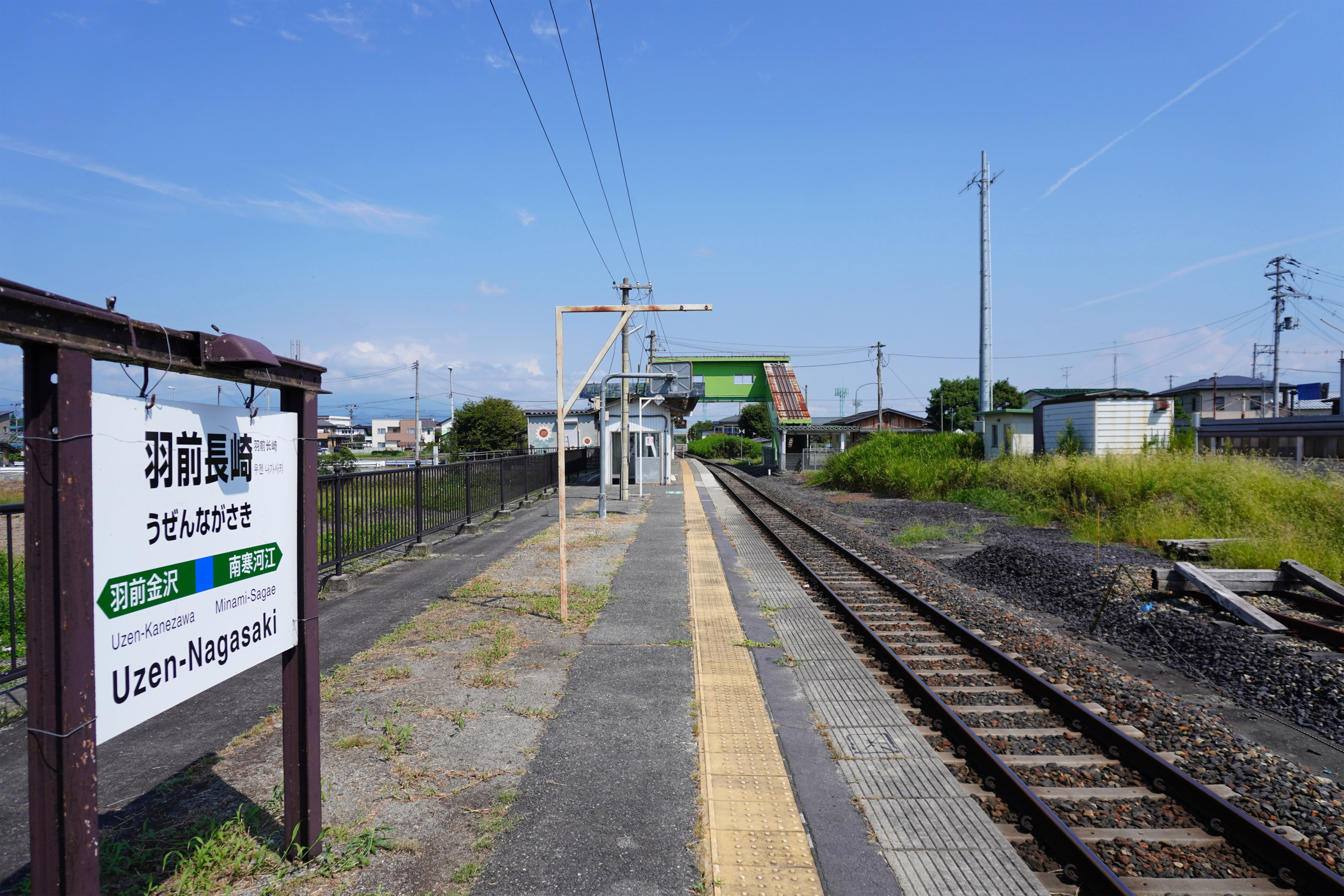
Platform, September 2023

== History ==
Uzen-Nagasaki Station began operation on July 20, 1921. The station briefly acted as the terminal station of the Aterazawa line, until December 11, 1921, when the line was extended to Sagae. With the privatization of the JNR on April 1, 1987, the station came under the control of the East Japan Railway Company. In 2004, platform 1 of the island platform was transformed into a west-side exit at the request of residents on the west side of the station.

The Station will start accepting Suica Cards in Spring 2024, with the extension of the Sendai area Suica zone to Yamagata Prefecture.

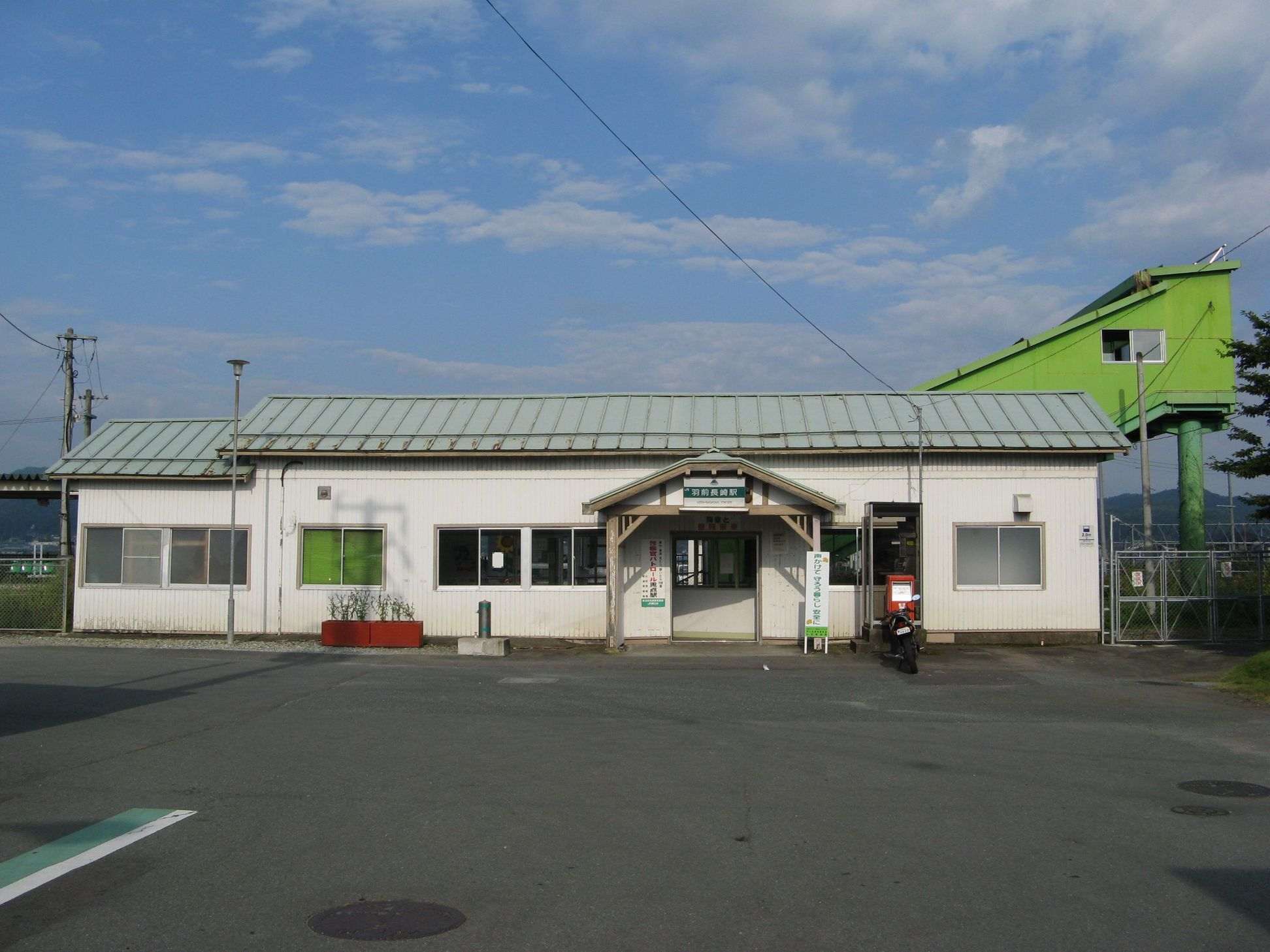
Old east exit station Building, August 2009

== Passenger statistics ==
In fiscal 2022, the station was used by an average of 317 passengers daily (boarding passengers only).

Below is table containing the passenger statistics since the year 2000:

Passenger statistics
Year	Average Daily Boarding Passengers	Year	Average Daily Boarding Passengers	Year	Average Daily Boarding Passengers
2000	549	2010	402	2020	292
2001	605	2011	422	2021	308
2002	530	2012	436	2022	317
2003	498	2013	468		
2004	476	2014	418		
2005	470	2015	412		
2006	446	2016	394		
2007	441	2017	404		
2008	436	2018	376		
2009	413	2019	366		

== Surrounding area ==
- National Route 112
- Yamagata Prefectural Baseball Stadium
- Nakayama High School
- Nagasaki Elementary School
