= Yodo-class cruiser =

1908 class of Japanese dispatch ships

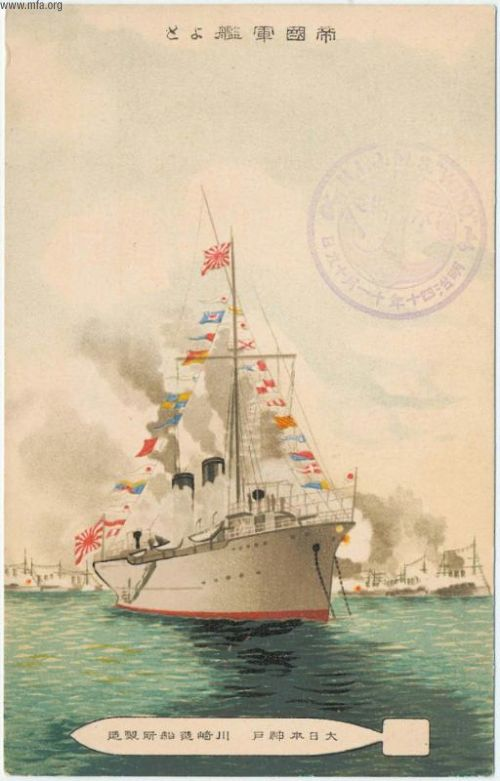
- Yodo

Class overview
- Name: Yodo class
- Builders: Kawasaki Dockyard; Mitsubishi Shipyards
- Operators: Imperial Japanese Navy
- Preceded by: Tone
- Succeeded by: Chikuma class
- Built: 1906–1908
- In commission: 1908–1940
- Planned: 2
- Completed: 2
- Retired: 2

General characteristics
- Type: Protected cruiser
- Displacement: 1,270 long tons (1,290 t)-1,372 long tons (1,394 t)
- Length: 93.1 m (305 ft 5 in)-96.3 m (315 ft 11 in) o/a
- Beam: 9.5 m (31 ft 2 in)
- Draught: 3 m (9 ft 10 in)
- Speed: 22 knots (25 mph; 41 km/h)-23 knots (26 mph; 43 km/h)
- Range: 3,300 nmi (6,100 km) at 10 kn (12 mph; 19 km/h)
- Complement: 180
- Armament: 2 × QF 4.7-inch Gun Mk I–IVs; 4 × QF 12 pounder 12 cwt naval guns s; 1 × machine gun; 2 × 457 mm (18.0 in) torpedo tubes
- Armour: Deck: 63 mm (2 in); Conning tower: 51 mm (2 in)

The two Yodo-class dispatch ship (淀型通報艦, Yodo-gata tsūhōkan) were a class of small, high-speed, dispatch ships built for the Imperial Japanese Navy. Although classified officially rated as a tsūhōkan, meaning dispatch boat or aviso, the class were essentially small protected cruisers. The Yodo class was followed by the larger, more conventional Chikuma class.

== Background ==
The Yodo-class cruisers were designed and built domestically in Japan, having been ordered as part of the 1904 Emergency Fleet Replenishment Program to recover from losses to the Japanese navy from the Russo-Japanese War but were not laid down until after the war had ended with the Treaty of Portsmouth due to delays in construction. The class consisted of two vessels; the leadship of the class, the Yodo (淀) was named after the Yodo River outside Osaka, Japan and was laid down in Kawasaki Shipyards in Kobe in 1906. Yodo's sister ship, Mogami (最上), named after the Mogami River in northern Honshū, Japan, was laid down in the Mitsubishi Yards in Nagasaki the following year. The lightly armed and lightly armored Yodo-class vessels were intended for scouting, high speed reconnaissance, and to serve as dispatch vessels. However, they were already obsolete when designed, with the development of wireless communication used during the Russo-Japanese War of 1904–1905. Both ships were reclassified as first class gunboats on 12 October 1912.

== Design ==
The design of the two Yodo-class cruisers differed noticeably. Not only was Mogami larger and heavier than Yodo, it also had a straight raked bow with three smokestacks, compared to Yodo which had a clipper bow and two smokestacks. Another significant difference between the two ships was their propulsion systems, while Yodo had a conventional two shaft, four cylinder reciprocating (VTE) engines with four Miyabara boilers, Mogami has the distinction of being the first Parsons-type turbine-powered vessel in the Imperial Japanese Navy.

The Yodo class was armed with two QF 4.7-inch guns at fore and aft of the ship with a secondary armament of QF 12 pounder 12 cwt naval guns. The Yodo class was armed with two 457 mm (18.0 in) torpedo tubes. Armour protection of the Yodo class consisted of 64 mm (2.5 in) of Krupp armour on the deck and 51 mm (2.0 in) on the conning tower. The design did not incorporate any side armour.

== Ships in class ==
Two ships were budgeted for and completed under the 1904 Emergency Fleet Replenishment Program, one each from the Kawasaki Dockyard Company, Kobe and Mitsubishi Shipyards, Nagasaki. Both ships served in World War I. The Yodo additionally in the Second Sino-Japanese War and the first months of World War II, and were scrapped before the outbreak of the Pacific War.

=== Yodo (淀) ===
Yodo was completed on 8 April 1908, at the Kawasaki Dockyard Company. Initially assigned to training and coastal duties, Yodo was reclassified as a first class gunboat on 12 October 1912. During World War I, Yodo was present at the Siege of Tsingtao and the Japanese invasion of German New Guinea. After the war Yodo was assigned to survey and miscellaneous auxiliary along the coast of China until the Manchurian Incident in 1931. During the 1930s Yodo would be assigned patrol duties along the coast of the Republic of China, with her patrol range extended during after the beginning of the Second Sino-Japanese War in 1937.

Yodo was demilitarized on 1 April 1940 and renamed Hulk #13. It remained moored to a pier at Iwakuni throughout World War II, and was finally broken up for scrap in 1945.

=== Mogami (最上) ===
Mogami was completed on 16 September 1908, at the Mitsubishi Yards. Initially assigned to training and coastal duties, Mogami was reclassified as a first class gunboat on 12 October 1912. Mogami was part of the Japanese fleet at the Siege of Tsingtao in World War I, and assisted in the sinking of the German torpedo boat S90. From 1917 to 1921, Mogami was assigned to patrol duties in the Caroline Islands and Mariana Islands after Japan's capture of those island groups from Germany. From 1921 to 1928, Mogami was assigned to patrols off of the Siberian coast, and to fishery patrol duties, during the period of Japan's Siberian Intervention against the Bolshevik Red Army during the Russian Civil War.

Mogami was scrapped on 1 April 1928. Although Mogami was considered the more modern and advanced in design, with her higher speed and turbine engine, she was retired much earlier than her sister ship, Yodo, largely due to performance and maintenance issues with her engines.
