= Japanese cruiser Yodo =

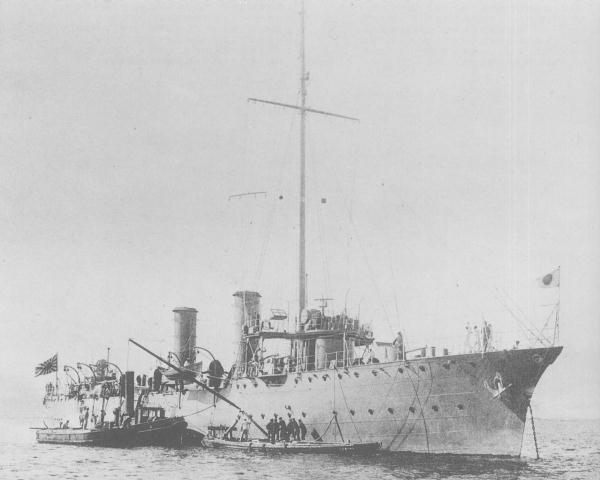
- Yodo in 1908 at Yokosuka

History

Empire of Japan
- Name: Yodo
- Ordered: 1904 Fiscal Year
- Builder: Kawasaki Shipyards, Kobe
- Laid down: 2 October 1906
- Launched: 11 November 1907
- Commissioned: 8 April 1908
- Decommissioned: 1 April 1940
- Fate: Broken up for scrap, 1945

General characteristics
- Class & type: Yodo-class cruiser
- Displacement: 1,270 t (1,250 long tons)
- Length: 93.1 m (305 ft 5 in) o/a
- Beam: 9.5 m (31 ft 2 in)
- Draught: 3 m (9 ft 10 in)
- Propulsion: 2 shaft reciprocating (VTE) engines; 4 Miyabara boilers; 6,500 shp (4,800 kW); 339 tons coal; 76 tons oil
- Speed: 22 knots (25 mph; 41 km/h)
- Complement: 116
- Armament: 2 × QF 4.7 inch Gun Mk I–IV s; 4 × QF 12 pounder 12 cwt naval gun s; 1 × machine gun; 2 × 457 mm (18.0 in) torpedo tubes
- Armour: Deck: 62 mm (2.4 in); Conning tower: 50 mm (2.0 in)

Yodo (淀) was the lead ship in the Yodo class of high speed protected cruisers in the Imperial Japanese Navy. Officially rated as a tsūhōkan, meaning dispatch boat or aviso, Yodo was named after the Yodo River outside Osaka, Japan. Her sister ship was Mogami. Yodo had a clipper bow and two smokestacks, whereas Mogami had a straight raked bow with three smokestacks.

== Background ==
Designed and built domestically in Japan, the lightly armed and lightly armored Yodo-class vessels were intended for scouting, high speed reconnaissance, and to serve as dispatch vessels. However, they were already obsolete when designed, with the development of wireless communication used during the Russo-Japanese War of 1904–1905. Yodo was the first warship to be built by Kawasaki Heavy Industries at its Kawasaki Shipyard in Kobe.

== Service life ==
Sketch of Yodo in 1909 by Oscar Parkes

Completed after the end of the Russo-Japanese War, Yodo was used initially for training and coastal patrol duties.

In November 1911, Yodo was dispatched to Bangkok, Siam as part of the Japanese naval delegation attending the coronation ceremonies for King Rama VI of Thailand.

Yodo was re-classified as a 1st class gunboat on 12 October 1912. In World War I, she was assigned to the Japanese 2nd fleet, and although present at the Battle of Tsingtao, did not see any combat. She was subsequently assigned to patrols of former German Micronesia, which has been occupied by Japan during the early stages of the war.

After World War I, Yodo was used as a surveying ship and made various survey trips along the China coast, along with being assigned various miscellaneous auxiliary duties, from its home port at Kure Naval District. With the growing conflict in China following in 1931 Manchurian Incident, Yodo was assigned primarily to patrols of the north China coastline in the 1930s, with her patrol area extending to the central China coastline after the start of the Second Sino-Japanese War in 1937.

Yodo was demilitarized on 1 April 1940 and renamed Hulk #13. It remained moored to a pier at Iwakuni throughout World War II, and was towed to Hikari, where she was broken up for scrap in 1945.
