= Japanese cruiser Mogami (1908) =

Imperial Japanese Navy ship

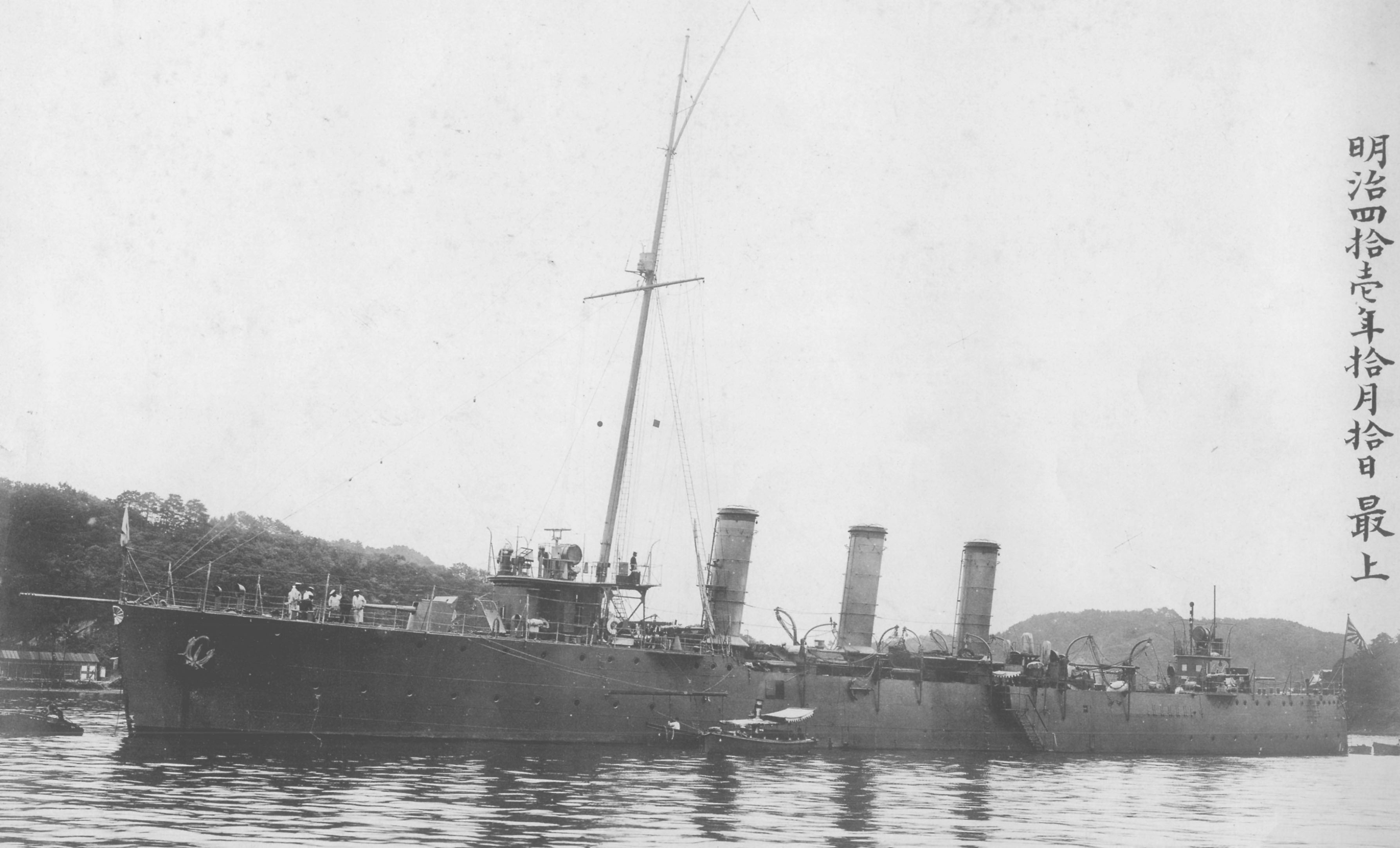
- Mogami in 1908 at Sasebo

History

Empire of Japan
- Name: Mogami
- Ordered: 1904 Fiscal Year
- Builder: Mitsubishi Yards, Nagasaki, Japan
- Laid down: 3 March 1907
- Launched: 25 March 1908
- Commissioned: 16 September 1908
- Decommissioned: 1 April 1928
- Fate: Scrapped, 31 January 1929

General characteristics
- Class & type: Yodo-class cruiser
- Displacement: 1,372 t (1,350 long tons)
- Length: 96.3 m (316 ft) o/a
- Beam: 9.5 m (31 ft)
- Draft: 3 m (9.8 ft)
- Installed power: 6,000 kW (8,000 hp)
- Propulsion: 3 × Parsons-type steam turbines; 6 × Miyabara boilers; 3 × shafts
- Speed: 23 kn (43 km/h; 26 mph)
- Capacity: Coal: 68 tons; Fuel Oil: 352 tons
- Complement: 134
- Armament: 2 × QF 4.7 inch Gun Mk I–IVs; 4 × QF 12 pounder 12 cwt naval guns; 1 × machine gun; 2 × 457 mm (18.0 in) torpedo tubes
- Armor: Deck: 62 mm (2.4 in); Conning Tower: 50 mm (2.0 in)

Mogami (最上) was the second ship in the Yodo class of high-speed protected cruisers in the Imperial Japanese Navy. Officially rated as a tsūhōkan, meaning dispatch boat or aviso, she was named after the Mogami River in northern Honshū, Japan. Her sister ship was Yodo. Yodo had a clipper bow and two smokestacks, whereas Mogami had a straight raked bow with three smokestacks.

== Background ==
Designed and built domestically in Japan, the lightly armed and lightly armored Yodo-class vessels were intended for scouting, high speed reconnaissance, and to serve as dispatch vessels. However, they were already obsolete when designed, with the development of wireless communication used during the Russo-Japanese War of 1904–1905.

Mogami has the distinction of being the first turbine-powered vessel in the Imperial Japanese Navy. However, as the Japanese could not yet produce reduction gears, Mogami utilized an unwieldy system of three direct-drive marine turbine engines, two for cruising and one for high speed. She was also the first warship to be produced by Mitsubishi Heavy Industries in Nagasaki.

== Service life ==
Completed after the end of the Russo-Japanese War, Mogami was used initially for training and coastal patrol duties. Mogami was re-classified as a 1st-class gunboat on 12 October 1912.

Mogami was part of the Japanese fleet at the Battle of Tsingtao in World War I, and assisted in the sinking of the German torpedo boat S90, which had torpedoed and sank the cruiser Takachiho earlier in the battle. The German ship ran out of fuel while trying to escape Tsingtao, and was intercepted by Mogami. From 1917 to 1921, Mogami was assigned to patrol duties in the Caroline Islands and Mariana Islands after Japan's capture of those island groups from Germany.

From 1921 to 1928, Mogami was assigned to patrols off of the Siberian coast, and to fishery patrol duties, during the period of Japan's Siberian Intervention against the Bolshevik Red Army during the Russian Civil War.

Mogami was scrapped on 1 April 1928. Although Mogami was considered the more modern and advanced in design, with her higher speed and turbine engine, she was retired much earlier than her sister ship, Yodo, largely due to performance and maintenance issues with her engines.

While being dismantled at Osaka, a spark from a welding torch ignited the remaining oil in Mogami's bunkers, causing an explosion and fire which destroyed the hulk of the vessel in two hours. The mainmast of Mogami was preserved at the Nakanoshima Park in downtown Osaka as a memorial until 9 February 2009 when it was removed to the Kure Maritime Museum.
