= Sagae Station =

Railway station in Sagae, Yamagata Prefecture, Japan

Sagae Station 寒河江駅
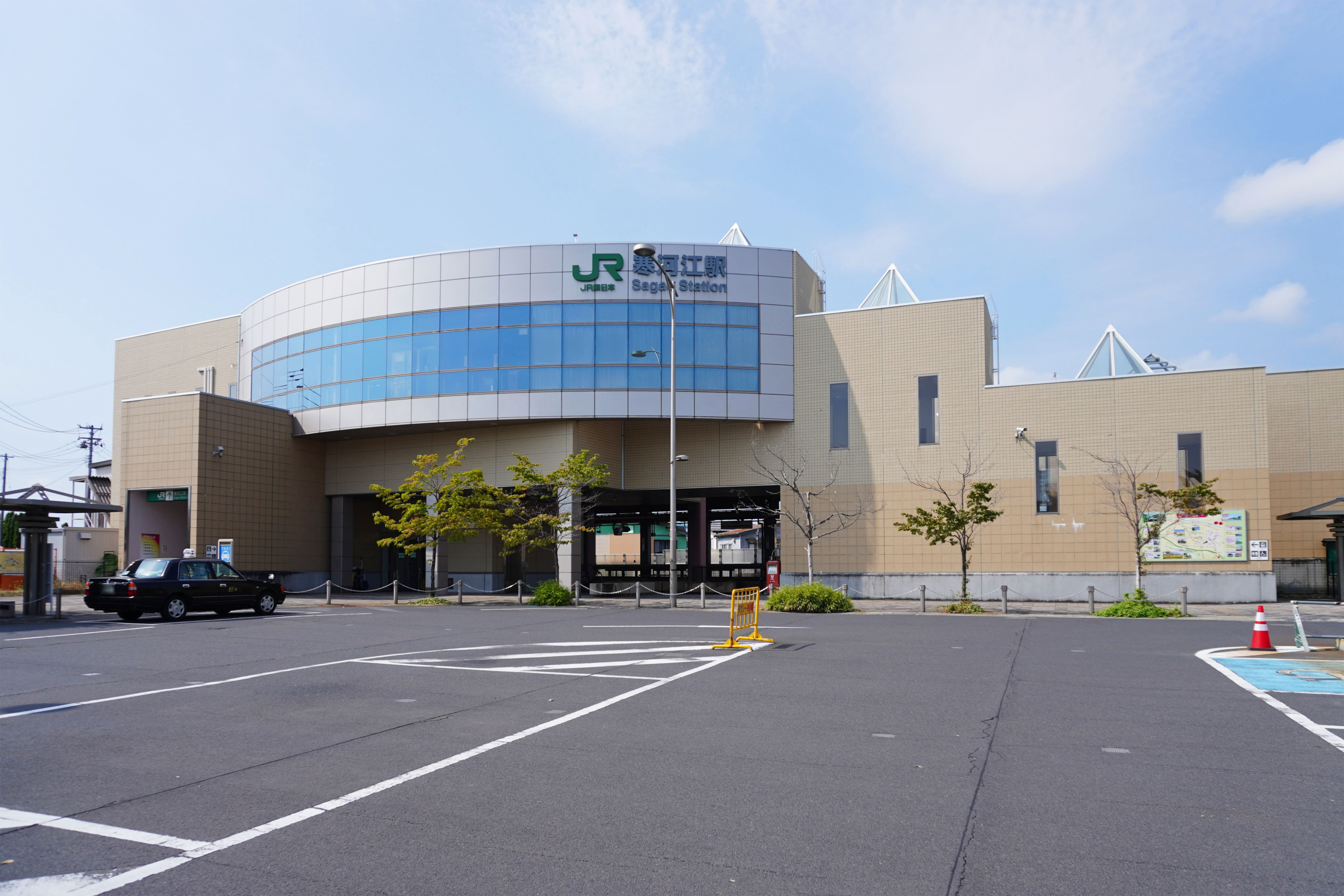
- Sagae Station in 2023

General information
- Location: 1-1, Honchō 1-chōme, Sagae-shi, Yamagata-ken 991-0031; Japan
- Coordinates: 38°22′18″N 140°16′31″E
- Operator: JR East
- Line: Aterazawa Line
- Distance: 15.3 km (9.5 mi) from Kita-Yamagata
- Platforms: 1 island platform

Other information
- Status: Staffed (Midori no Madoguchi)
- Website: Official website

History
- Opened: 11 December 1921; 104 years ago

Passengers
- FY2022: 799

Services
Preceding station	JR East	Following station
Nishi-Sagae towards Aterazawa	Aterazawa Line	Minami-Sagae towards Yamagata
Route map
Location
- Location within Yamagata Prefecture Location within Japan

Sagae Station (寒河江駅, Sagae eki) is a railway station located in the city of Sagae, Yamagata Prefecture, Japan, operated by the East Japan Railway Company (JR East).

== Lines ==
Sagae Station is served by the Aterazawa Line and is located 15.3 km (9.5 mi) from the start of the line at Kita-Yamagata, and 9 km (5.6 mi) from Aterazawa. The preceding station of Minami-Sagae is 1.8 km (1.1 mi) away and the following station of Nishi-Sagae is 1.1 km (0.68 mi) away.

== Station layout ==
The station has a single island platform. The station has a Midori no Madoguchi staffed ticket office. The station has a siding for vehicle storage and an inspection and repair shed. The Aterazawa Line vehicles and crews operate from this station. The station has many accessibility features such as elevators, Mobility scooter access, wheelchair-accessible bathroom, and a Braille Fare table.

=== Platforms ===
1	■ Aterazawa Line	for Yamagata
2	■ Aterazawa Line	for Aterazawa

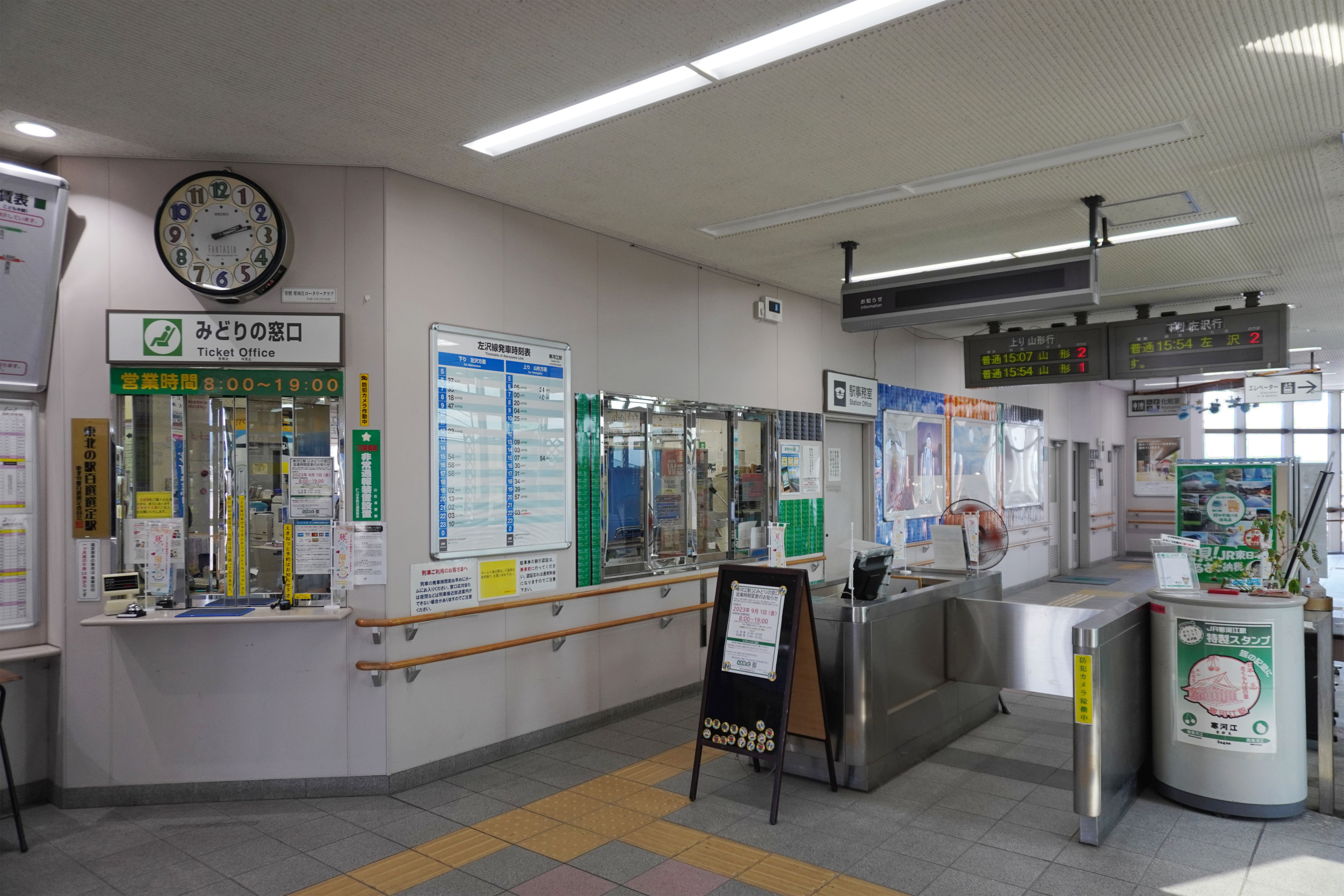
Ticket Gate, September 2023

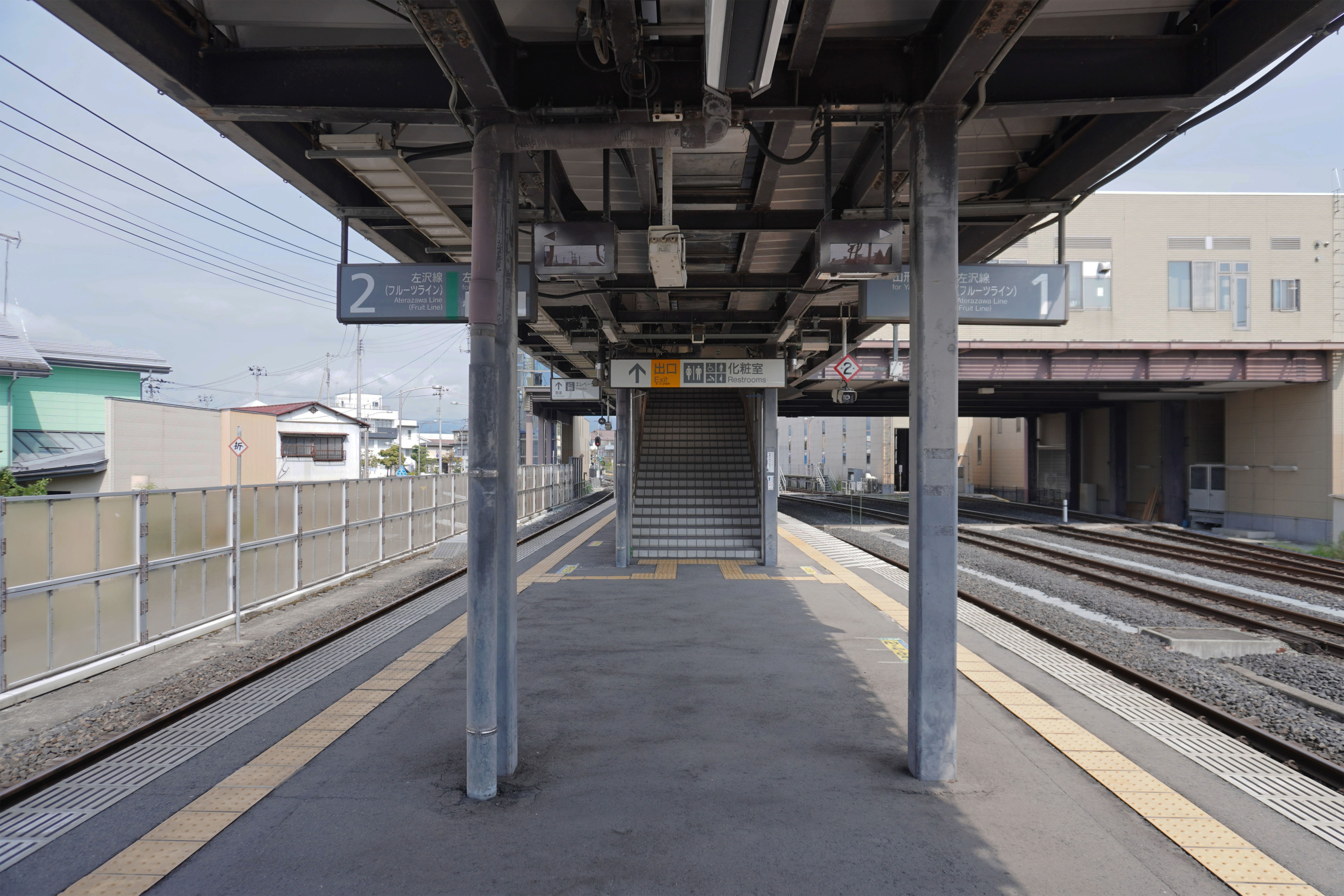
Platform, September 2023

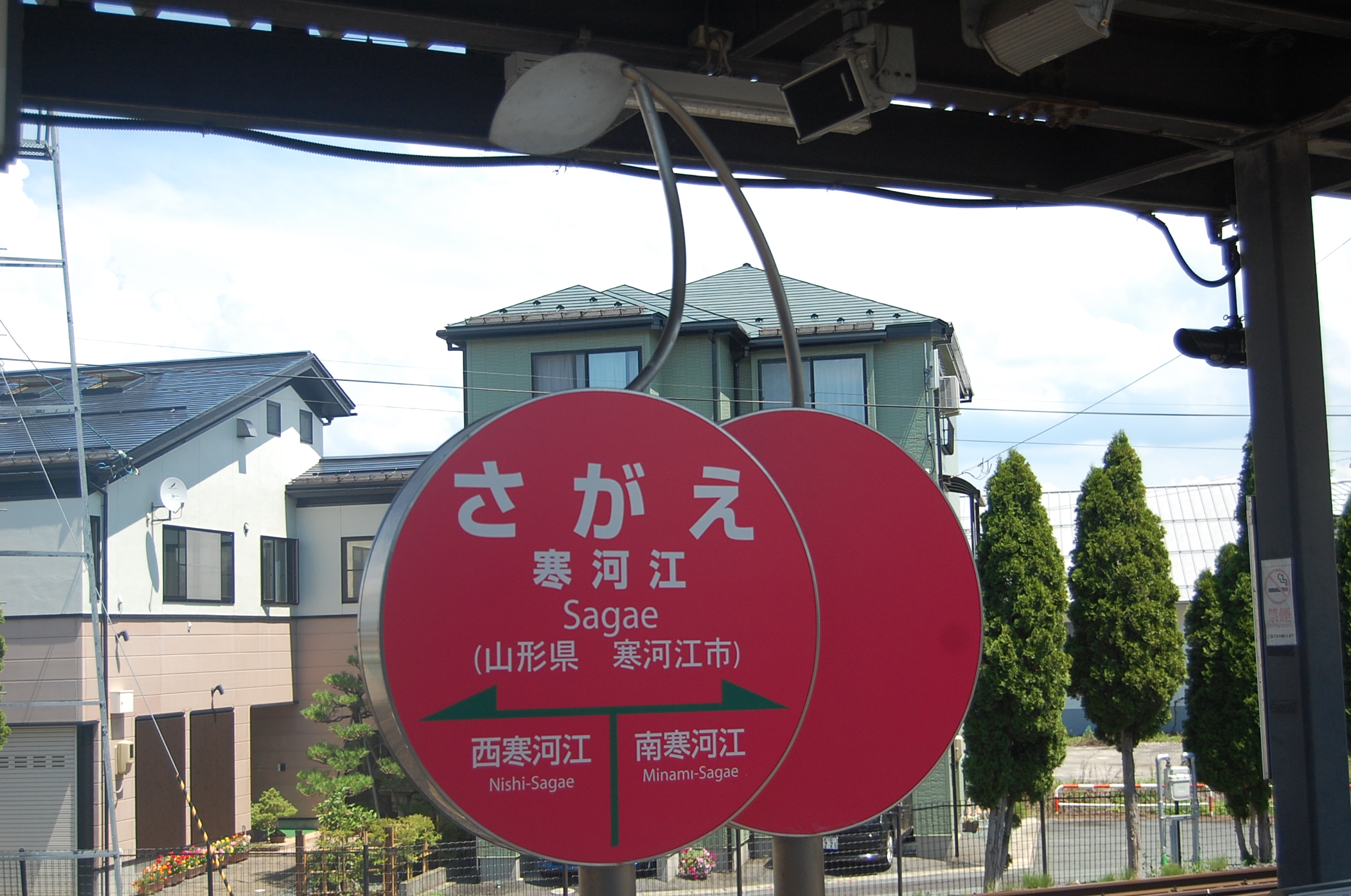
Station Sign, August 2021

== History ==
Sagae Station began operation on 11 December 1921. The station briefly acted as the terminus of the Aterazawa line until the line was extended to Aterazawa Station, the current Terminus, the following year. With the privatization of the JNR on April 1, 1987, the station came under the control of the East Japan Railway Company. A new station building was completed in 2005.

The Station will start accepting Suica Cards in Spring 2024, with the extension of the Sendai area Suica zone to Yamagata Prefecture.

== Passenger statistics ==
In fiscal 2022, the station was used by an average of 799 passengers daily (boarding passengers only).

Below is table containing the passenger statistics since the year 2000:

Passenger statistics
Year	Average Daily Boarding Passengers	Year	Average Daily Boarding Passengers	Year	Average Daily Boarding Passengers
2000	1,112	2010	920	2020	736
2001	865	2011	889	2021	772
2002	931	2012	920	2022	799
2003	947	2013	949		
2004	986	2014	886		
2005	960	2015	914		
2006	945	2016	935		
2007	944	2017	931		
2008	985	2018	905		
2009	963	2019	875		

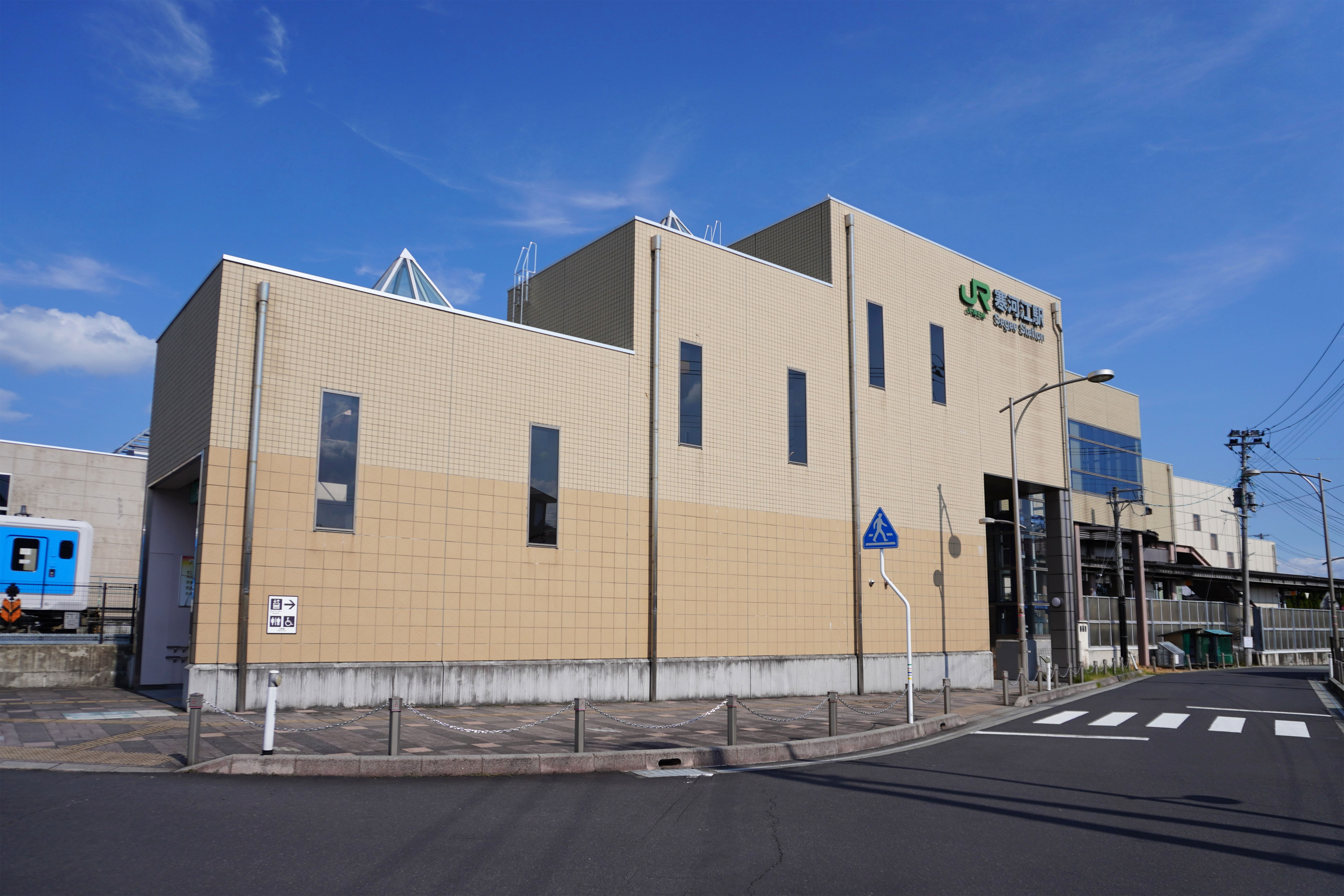
South Exit, September 2023

== Surrounding area ==
- Sagae City Hall
- Sagae Post Office
- Sagae Chubu Elementary School
- Sagae Elementary School
- Sagae Onsen

== See also ==
- List of railway stations in Japan
