= Mogami River =

River in Japan

Mogami River 最上川
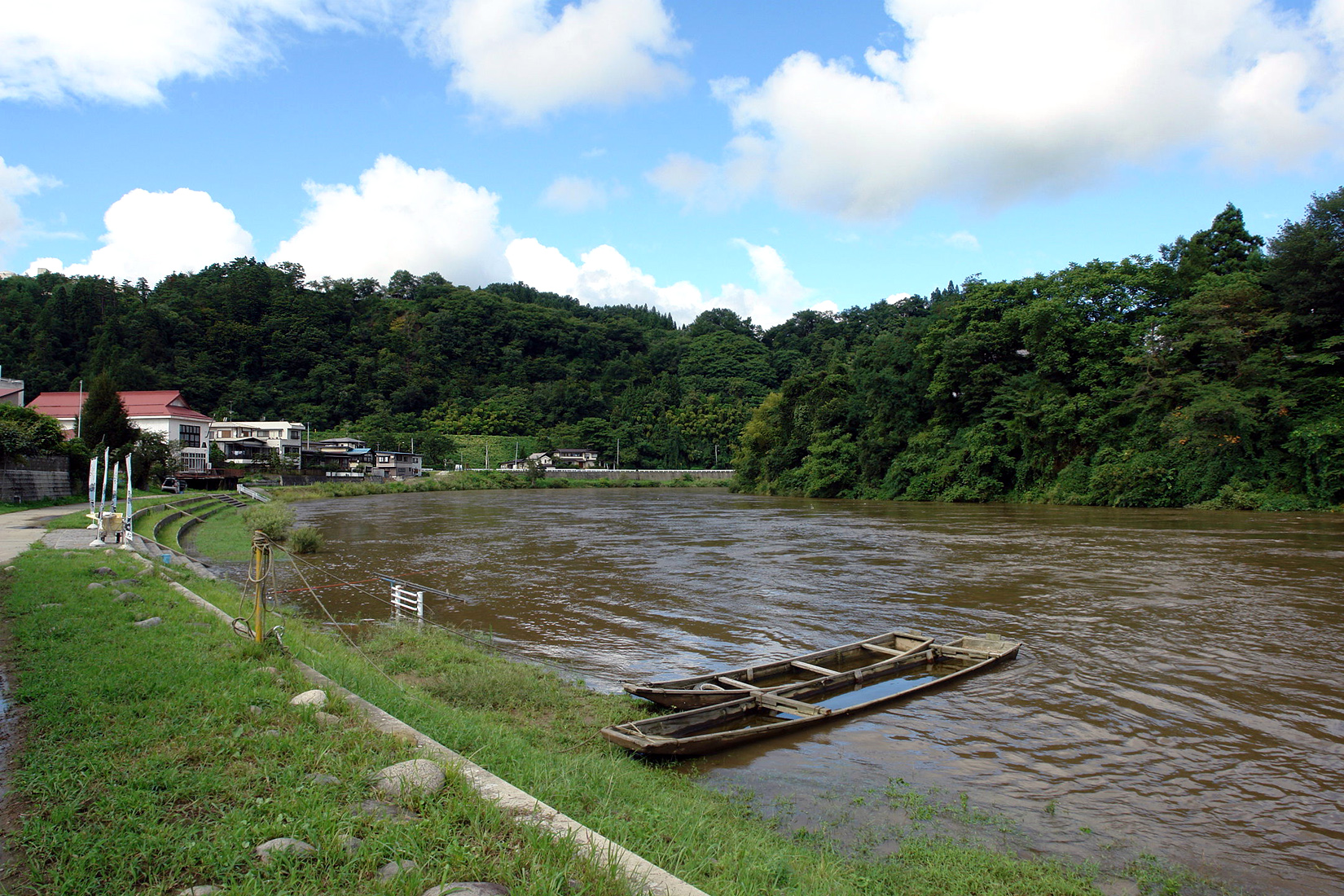

- Location within Japan
- Native name: Mogami-gawa (Japanese)

Location
- Country: Japan
- State: Yamagata

Physical characteristics
- Source: Mount Azuma
  - location: Yonezawa, Yamagata
  - coordinates: 37°45′50″N 140°10′48″E
  - elevation: 1,780 m (5,840 ft)
- Mouth: Sea of Japan
  - location: Sakata, Yamagata
  - coordinates: 38°55′23″N 139°48′36″E
  - elevation: 0 m (0 ft)
- Length: 229 km (142 mi)
- Basin size: 7,040 km^{2} (2,720 sq mi)
- Discharge
  - average: 392 m^{3}/s (13,800 cu ft/s)

The Mogami River (最上川, Mogami-gawa) is a Class A river in Yamagata Prefecture, Japan.

== Description and history ==
The river is 224 km (139 mi) long and has a watershed of 7,040 km (4,370 mi). It is regarded as one of the three most rapid rivers of Japan (along with the Fuji River and the Kuma River).

The river rises from southern Yamagata Prefecture, flows to the north, and turns west at Shinjō, then flows into the Sea of Japan at Sakata. Water transportation once flourished on the river and carried local products such as safflowers and rice to the Kansai region.

== Cultural references ==
The Mogami River appears as an utamakura in Japanese poetry, with the influential 17th-century poet Matsuo Bashō composing several hokku regarding the river during his travels alongside it. Some were revised as haiku in the memoir of his journeys, including this well-known poem:

五月雨をあつめて早し最上川

samidare o atsumete hayashi Mogami-gawa

gathering the rains
of the wet season — swift
the Mogami River
(trans. Shirane)

The character Yūko Aioi in Nichijou has inner monologues in haiku form, all ending with the name of the river as a complete non sequitur (as she cannot think of a full 5-7-5 haiku).

Mogami-gawa is also the name of the anthem of Yamagata Prefecture written by Emperor Hirohito. The Japanese Navy had two different cruisers named Mogami.

== Images ==
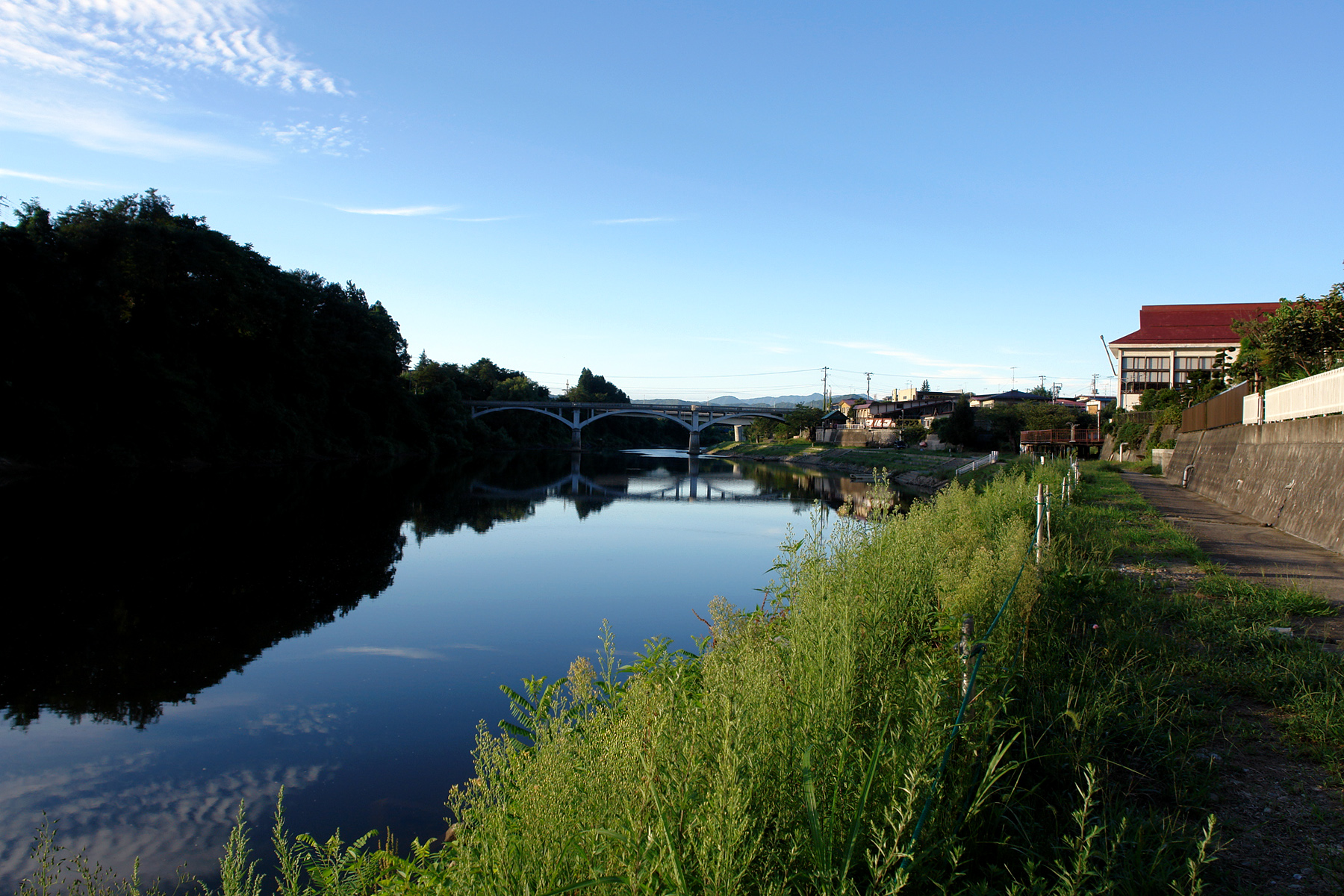

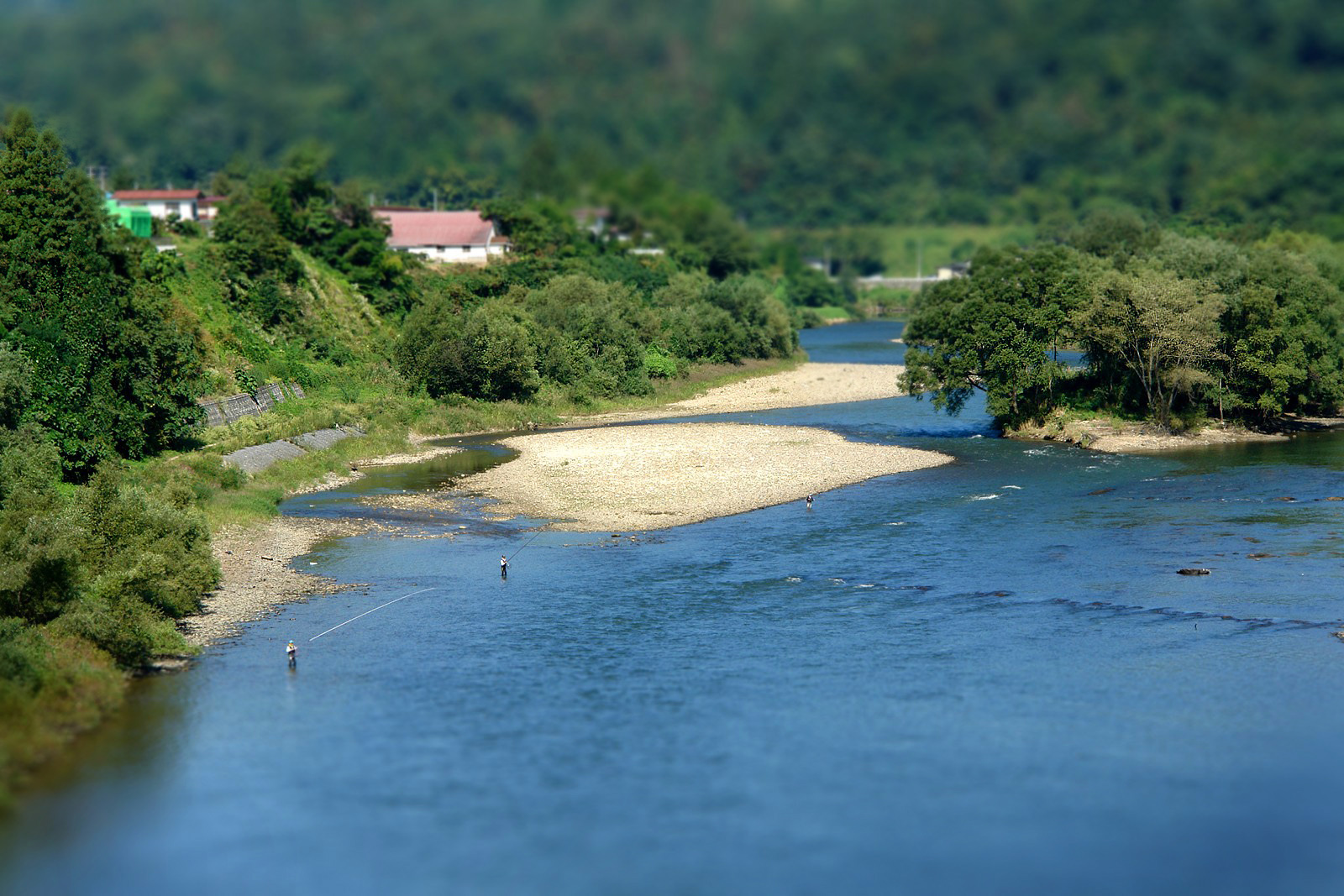

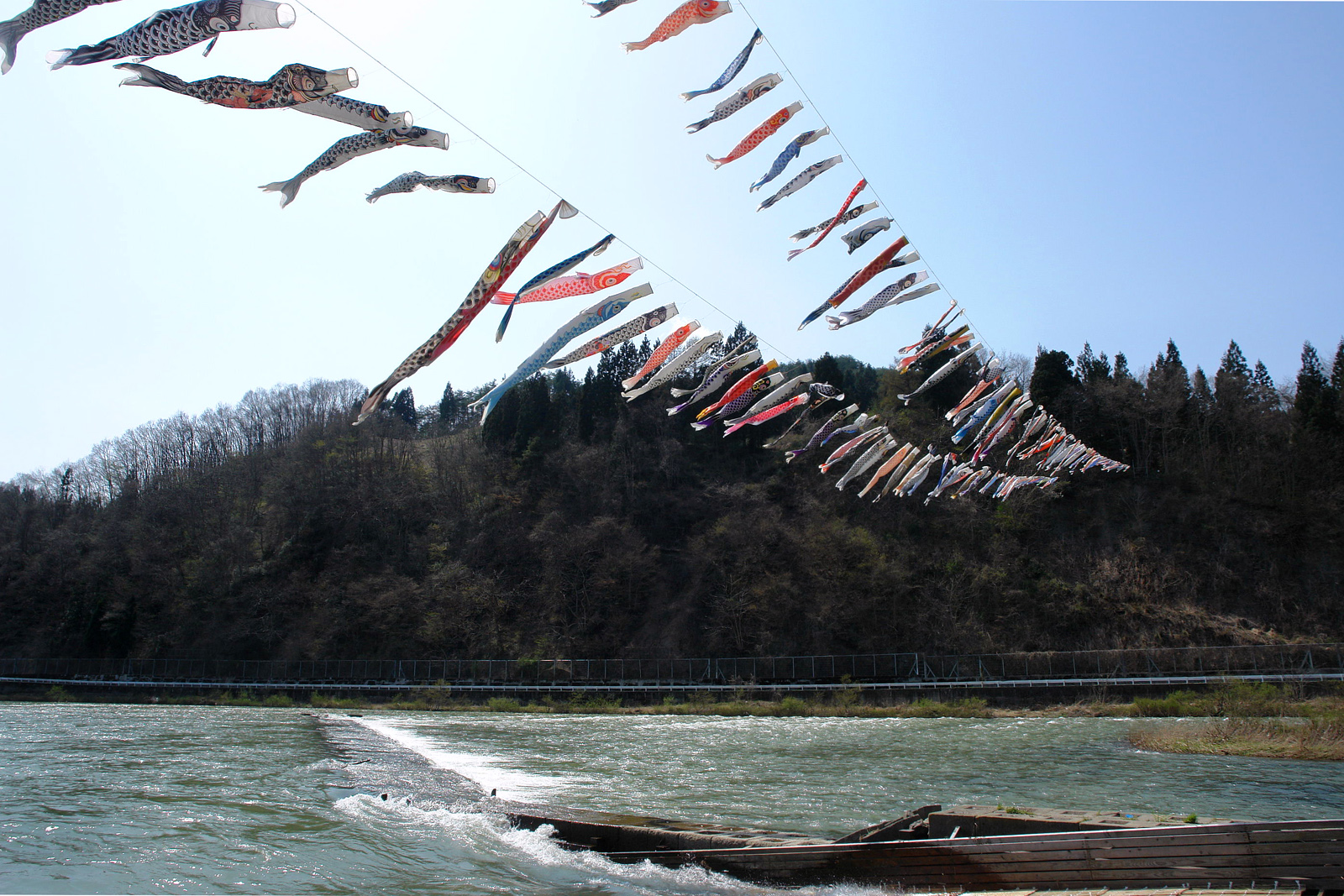

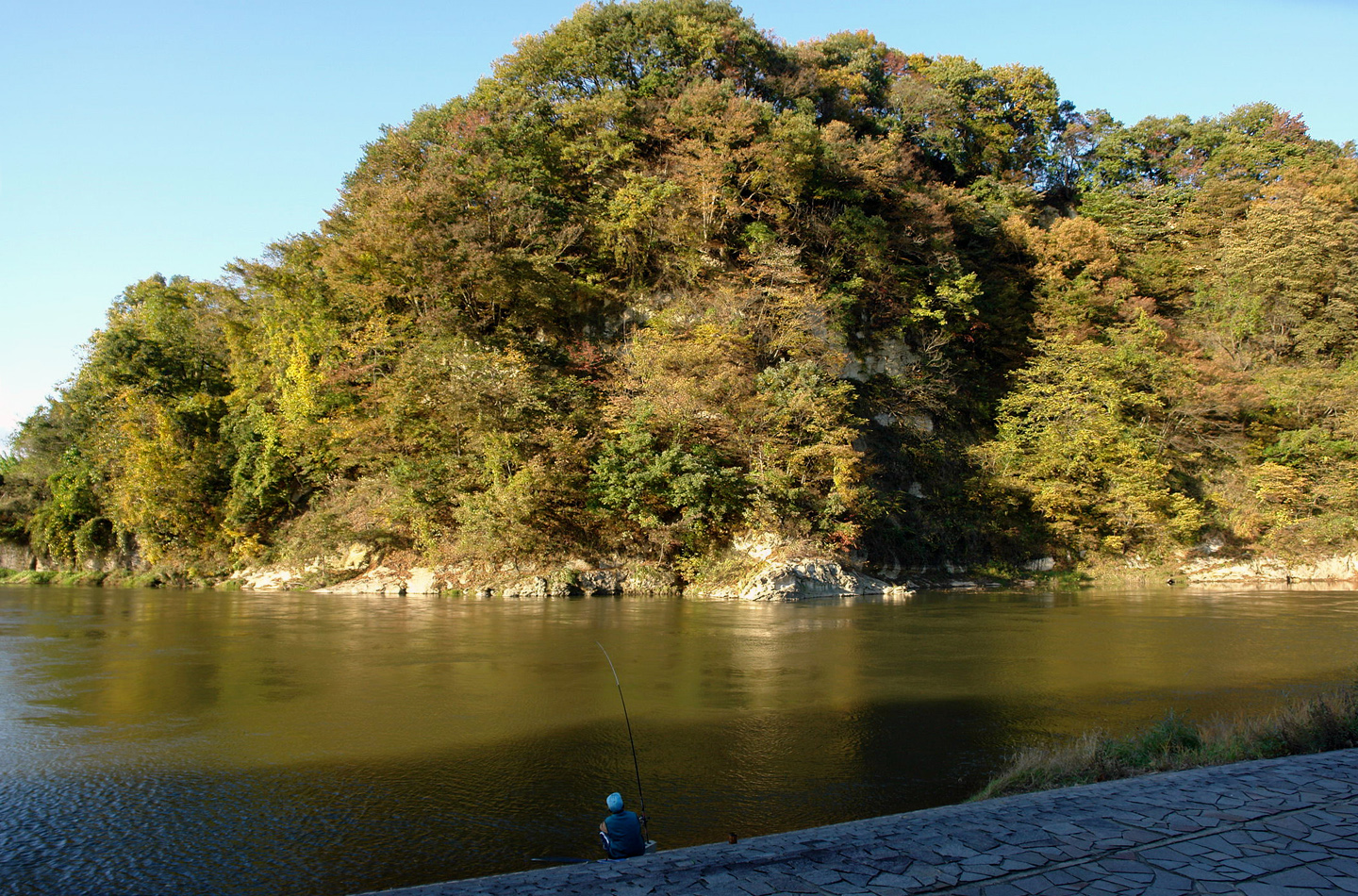

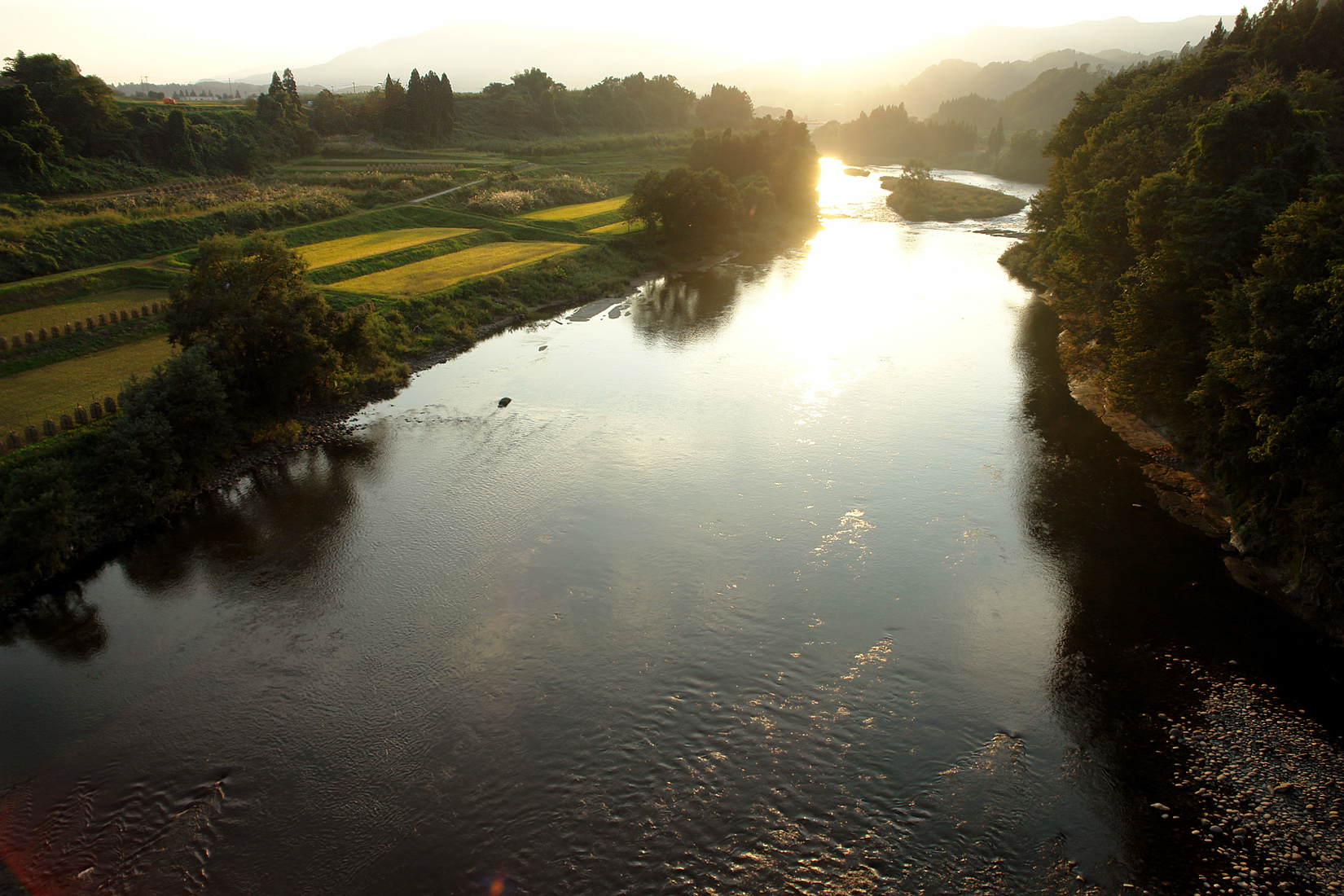

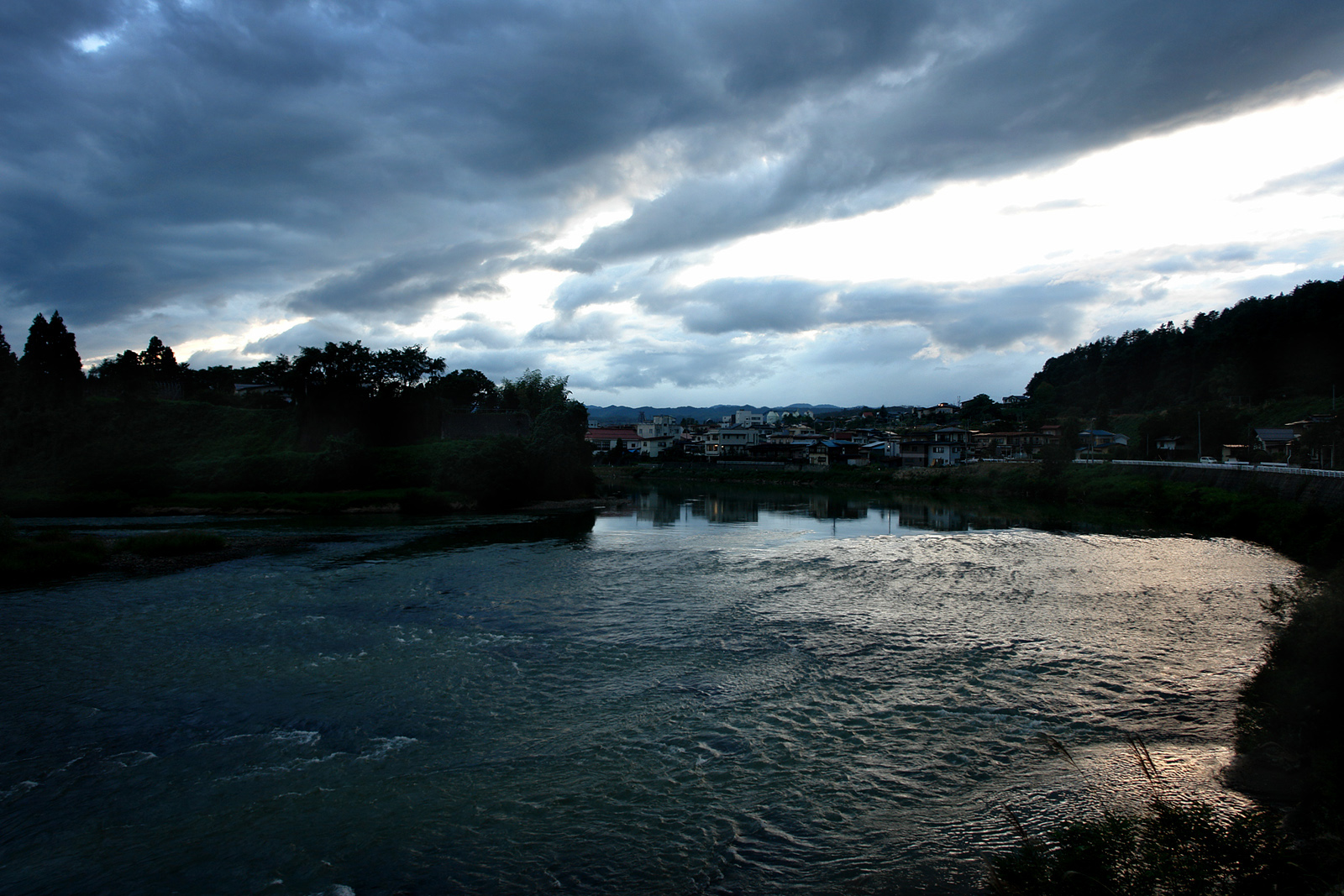
