= Mineta =

Mineta is a Japanese surname. Notable people and fictional characters with the name include:

== People ==
- Hiromu Mineta (峯田大夢, born 1995), Japanese voice actor
- Kazunobu Mineta (峯田和伸, born 1977), Japanese musician
- Norman Mineta (1931–2022), American politician

== Fictional characters ==
- Minoru Mineta (峰田 実), a character in the My Hero Academia series.
