= Yamagata Prefecture =

Prefecture of Japan

Coordinates: 38°26′N 140°8′E

Yamagata Prefecture 山形県
- Prefecture

Japanese transcription(s)
  - Japanese: 山形県
  - Rōmaji: Yamagata-ken
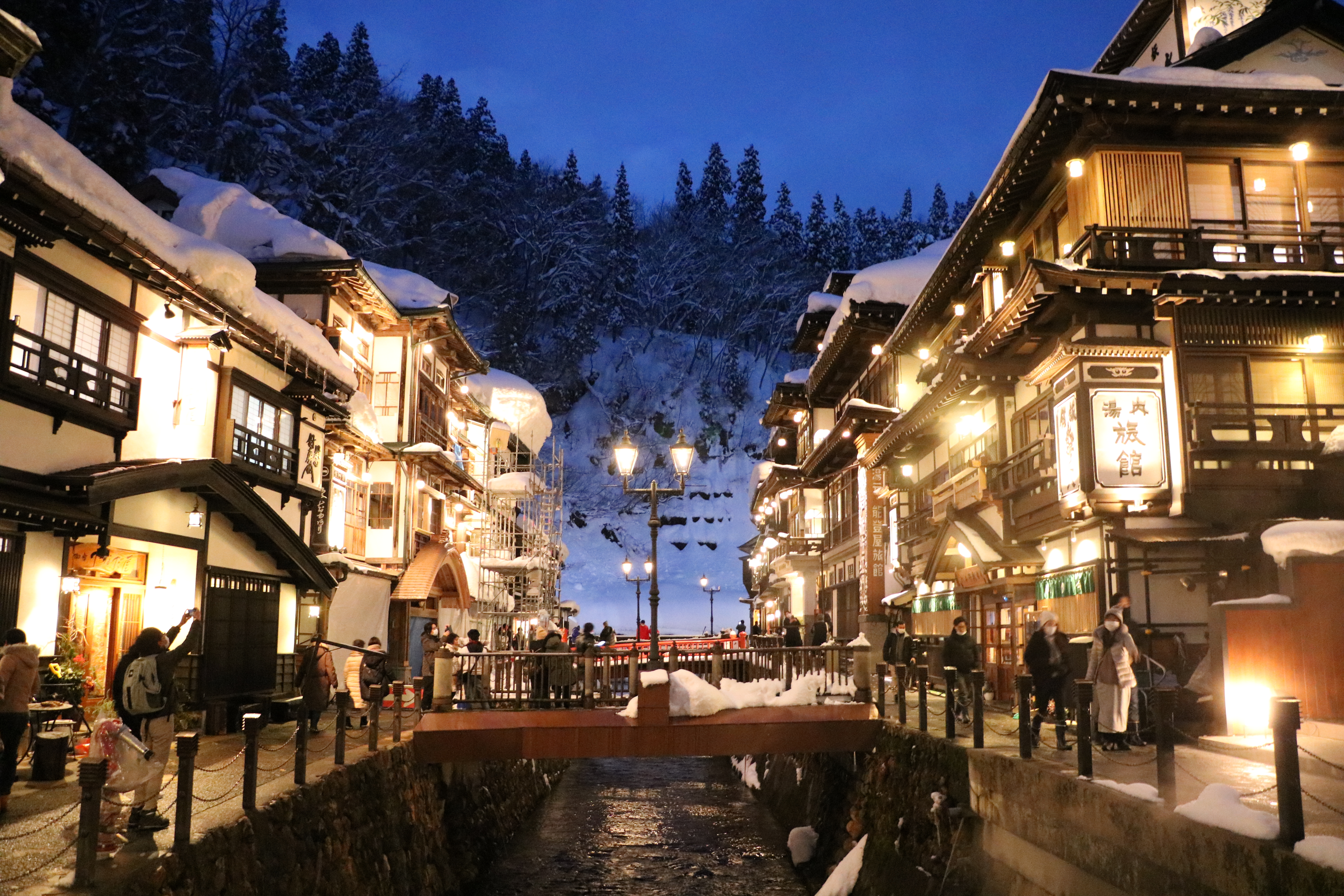
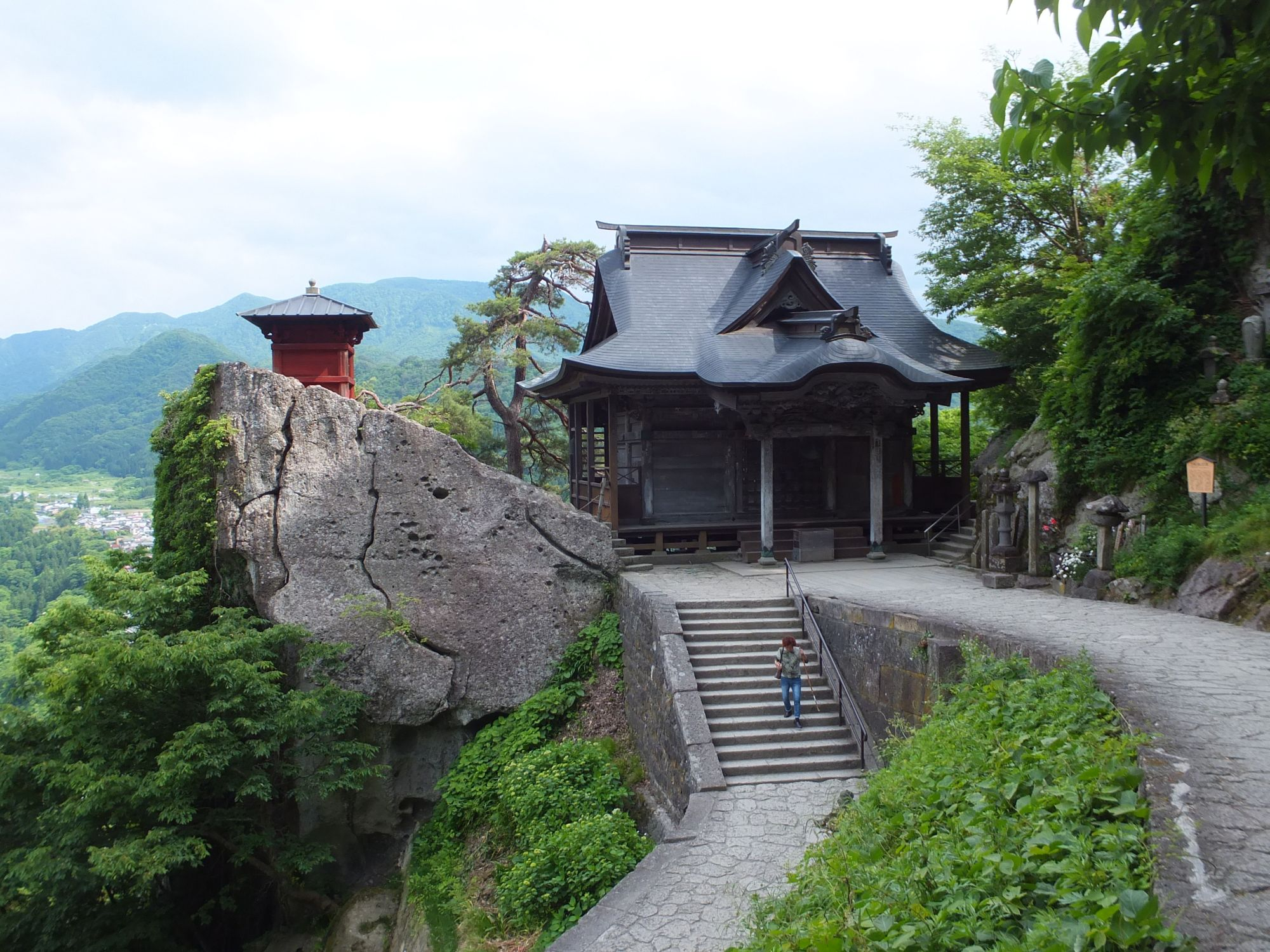
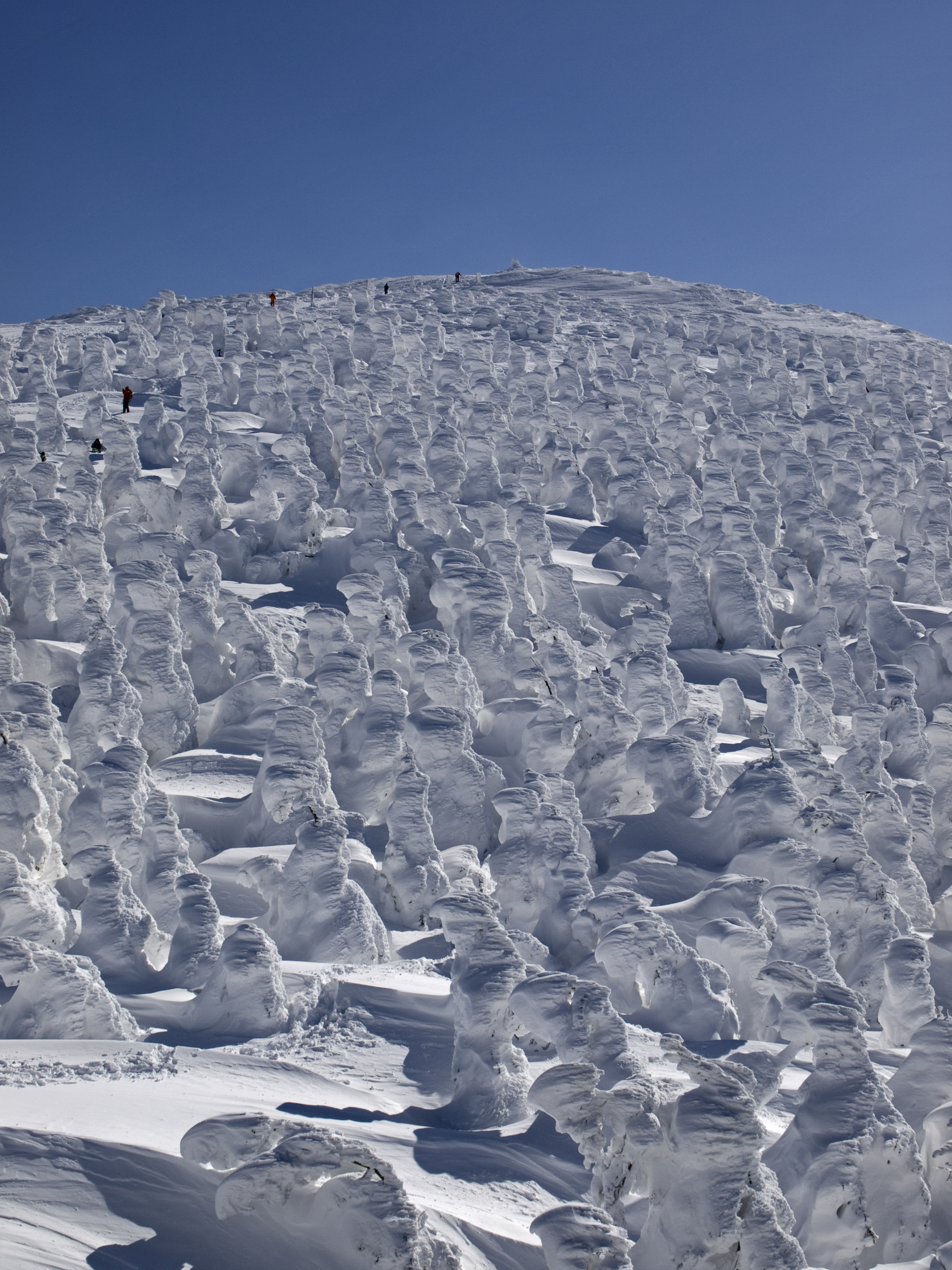
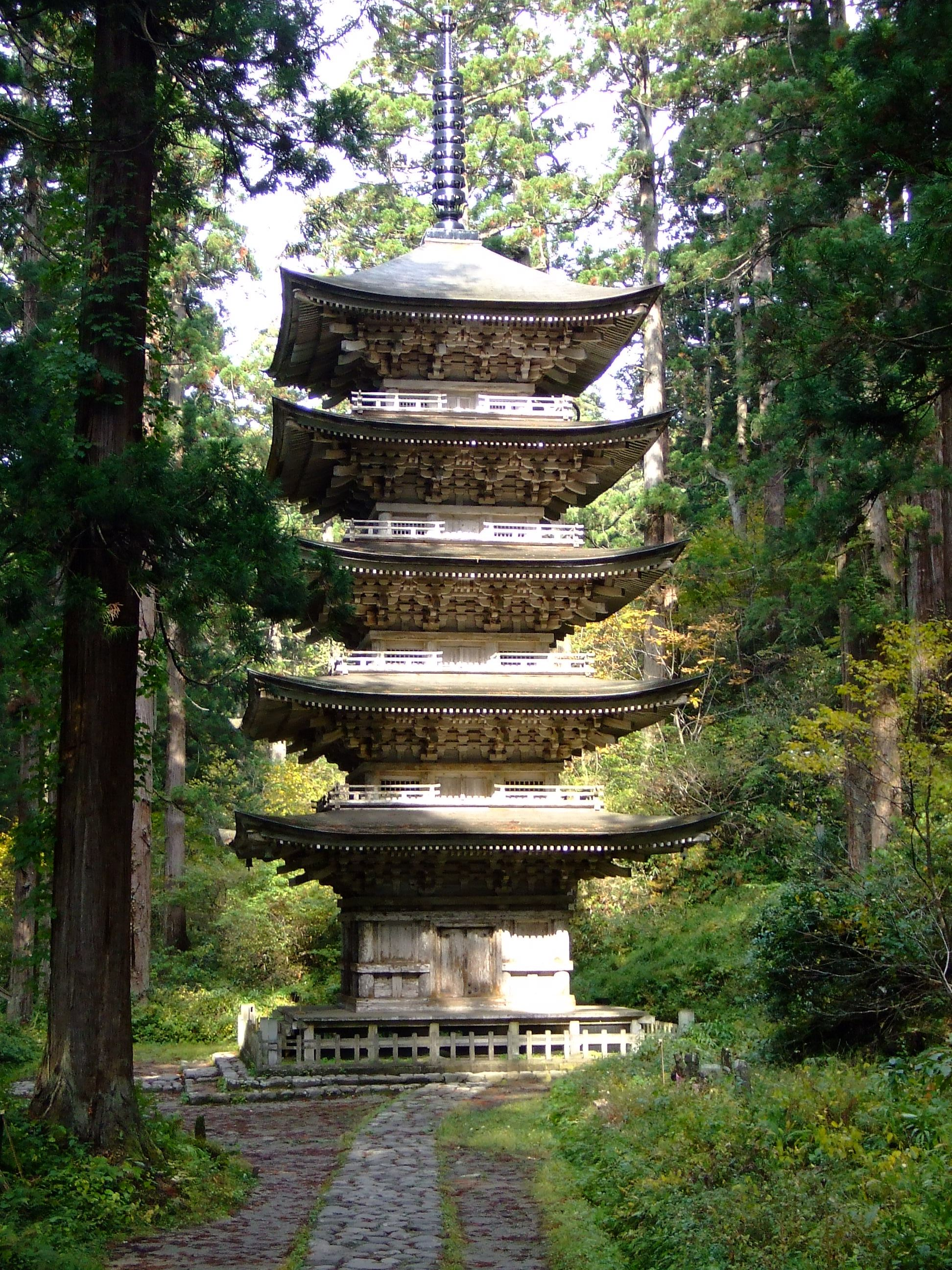
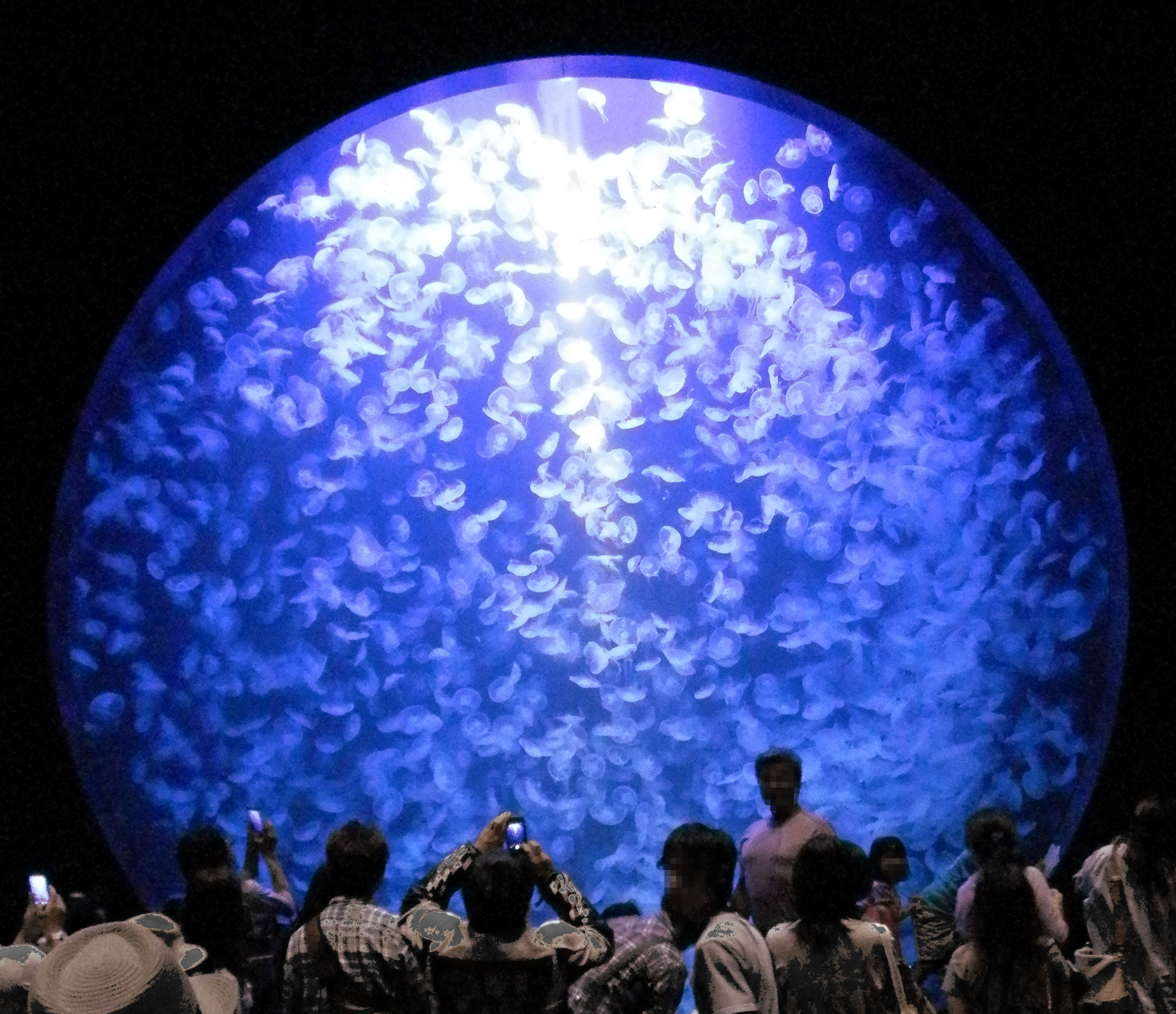
- Ginzan Onsen Yama-dera Snow monsters of Mount Zaō Mount Haguro Kamo Aquarium

- Flag Symbol
- Anthem: Mogami gawa
- Country: Japan
- Region: Tōhoku
- Island: Honshu
- Capital: Yamagata
- Subdivisions: Districts: 8, Municipalities: 35

Government
  - Governor: Mieko Yoshimura

Area
  - Total: 9,325.15 km^{2} (3,600.46 sq mi)
  - Rank: 9th

Population (April 1, 2026)
  - Total: 994,537
  - Rank: 35th
  - Density: 106.651/km^{2} (276.225/sq mi)
  - Dialects: Nairiku・Shōnai

GDP
  - Total: JP¥ 4,340 billion US$ 32.1 billion (2022)
- ISO 3166 code: JP-06
- Website: www.pref.yamagata.jp
- Symbols of Japan
- Bird: Mandarin duck (Aix galericulata)
- Fish: Cherry salmon (Oncorhynchus masou)
- Flower: Safflower (Carthamus tinctorius)
- Tree: Cherry

Yamagata Prefecture (山形県, Yamagata-ken (Note: Japanese pronunciation: [jä̀.mä́.ɡä̀.tä̀, -ŋä̀.tä̀, -ɡä́.tä́.kè̞ɴ̀, -ŋä́.tä́-])) is a prefecture of Japan located in the Tōhoku region of Honshu. It has a population of 978,846 (1 september 2026) and an area of 9,325 km^{2} (3,600 sq mi). Its neighbours are Akita Prefecture to the north, Miyagi Prefecture to the east, Fukushima Prefecture to the south, and Niigata Prefecture to the southwest.

The capital and largest city is Yamagata, with other major cities being Tsuruoka, Sakata and Yonezawa. The prefecture is located on Japan's western Sea of Japan coast and its borders with neighboring prefectures are formed by various mountain ranges, with 17% of its total land area being designated as Natural Parks. Yamagata Prefecture formed the southern half of the historic Dewa Province with Akita Prefecture and is home to the Three Mountains of Dewa, which includes the Haguro Five-story Pagoda, a recognised National Treasure of Japan.

== History ==
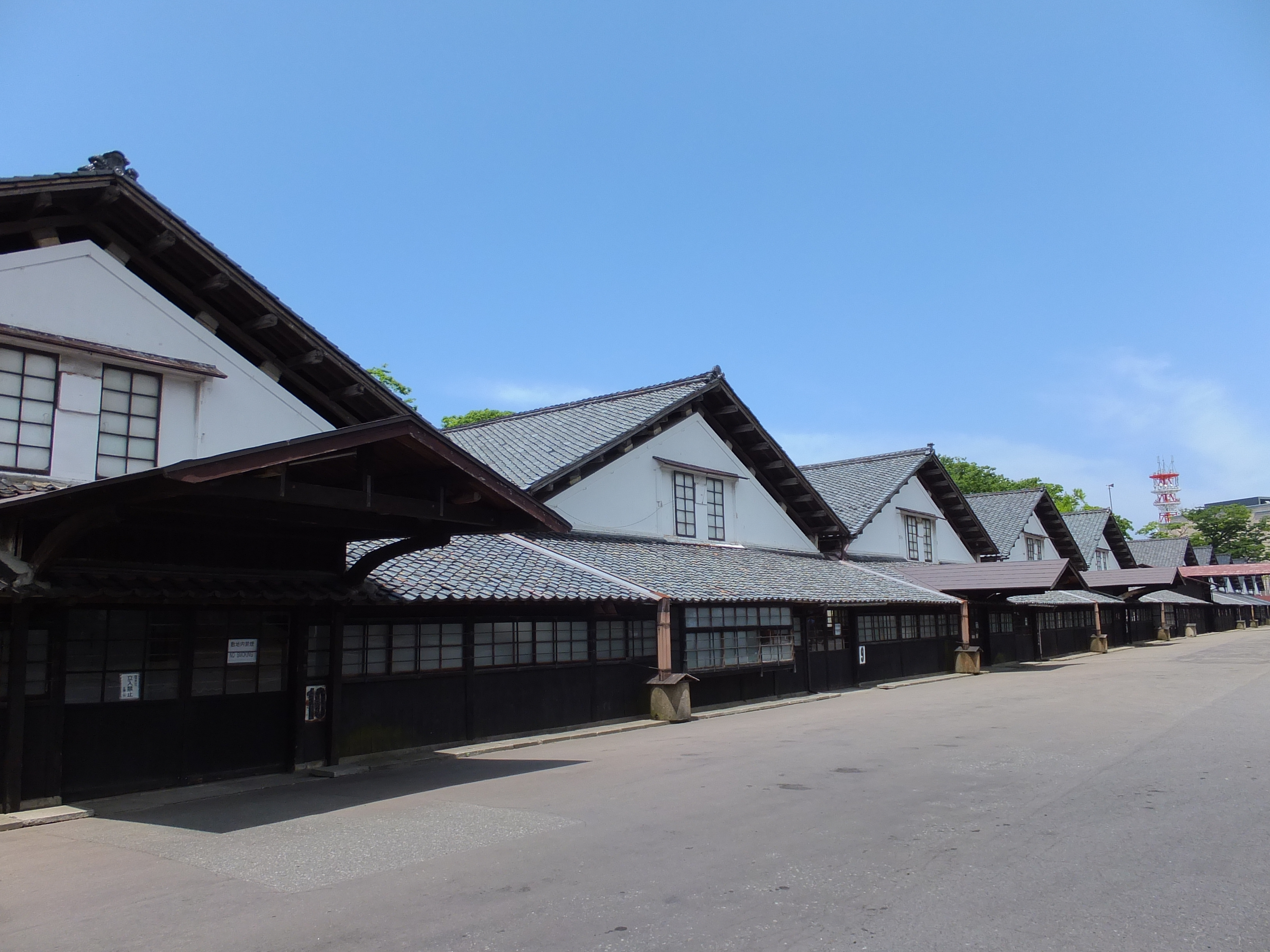
Sankyo Warehouse in Sakata City, related to Kitamaebune and transport on Mogami River.

The aboriginal Ezo (蝦夷) people once inhabited the area now known as Yamagata. Yamagata and Akita Prefecture were known as Dewa Province until the Meiji Restoration.

During the Heian period (794–1185), the Fujiwara (藤原) family ruled the area. Yamagata City flourished during the Edo period (1603–1867) due to its status as a castle town and post station, famous for beni (red safflower dye used in the production of handspun silk). In 1689, the famous haiku poet, Matsuo Bashō visited Yamagata during his five-month trip to the northern regions of Japan.

== Geography ==
Map of Yamagata Prefecture

Yamagata Prefecture is located in the southwest corner of Tōhoku, facing the Sea of Japan. It borders Niigata Prefecture and Fukushima Prefecture on the south, Miyagi Prefecture on the east, and Akita Prefecture on the north. All of these boundaries are marked by mountains, with most of the population residing in a limited central plain.

As of 31 March 2020, 17 percent of the total land area of the prefecture was designated as Natural Parks, namely the Bandai-Asahi National Park; Chōkai, Kurikoma, and Zaō Quasi-National Parks; and Goshōzan, Kabusan, Kennan, Mogamigawa, Shōnai Kaihin, and Tendō Kōgen Prefectural Natural Parks.

=== Cities ===
Thirteen cities are located in Yamagata Prefecture:

List of cities
Name		Area (km^{2})	Population	Population density (per km^{2})	Map
Rōmaji	Kanji	Area (km^{2})	Population	Population density (per km^{2})	Map
Higashine	東根市	207.17	47,910	231.26	
Kaminoyama	上山市	240.93	29,974	124.41	
Murayama	村山市	196.98	23,643	120.03	
Nagai	長井市	214.67	26,466	123.29	
Nan'yō	南陽市	160.52	31,112	193.82	
Obanazawa	尾花沢市	373.32	15,237	40.81	
Sagae	寒河江市	139.03	40,131	288.65	
Sakata	酒田市	602.97	99,341	164.75	
Shinjō	新庄市	223.08	34,937	156.61	
Tendō	天童市	113.01	61,947	548.16	
Tsuruoka	鶴岡市	1,311.53	125,389	95.61	
Yamagata (capital)	山形市	381.58	248,772	651.95	
Yonezawa	米沢市	548.51	81,707	148.96	

=== Towns and villages ===
These are the towns and villages in each district:

List of towns and villages
Name		Area (km^{2})	Population	Population density (per km^{2})	District	Type	Map
Rōmaji	Kanji	Area (km^{2})	Population	Population density (per km^{2})	District	Type	Map
Asahi	朝日町	196.73	7,020	35.68	Nishimurayama District	Town	
Funagata	舟形町	119.03	5,101	42.85	Mogami District	Town	
Iide	飯豊町	329.6	6,970	21.14	Nishiokitama District	Town	
Kahoku	河北町	52.38	18,301	349.39	Nishimurayama District	Town	
Kaneyama	金山町	161.79	5,205	32.17	Mogami District	Town	
Kawanishi	川西町	166.46	14,967	89.91	Higashiokitama District	Town	
Mamurogawa	真室川町	374.29	7,506	20.05	Mogami District	Town	
Mikawa	三川町	33.22	7,562	227.63	Higashitagawa District	Town	
Mogami	最上町	330.27	8,442	25.56	Mogami District	Town	
Nakayama	中山町	31.23	11,153	357.12	Higashimurayama District	Town	
Nishikawa	西川町	393.19	5,225	13.29	Nishimurayama District	Town	
Ōe	大江町	153.92	7,894	51.29	Nishimurayama District	Town	
Oguni	小国町	737.56	7,376	10.00	Nishiokitama District	Town	
Ōishida	大石田町	79.54	6,945	87.31	Kitamurayama District	Town	
Ōkura	大蔵村	211.59	3,044	14.39	Mogami District	Village	
Sakegawa	鮭川村	122.14	4,132	33.83	Mogami District	Village	
Shirataka	白鷹町	157.74	13,482	85.47	Nishiokitama District	Town	
Shōnai	庄内町	249.17	20,940	84.04	Higashitagawa District	Town	
Takahata	高畠町	180.26	23,367	129.63	Higashiokitama District	Town	
Tozawa	戸沢村	261.31	4,431	16.96	Mogami District	Village	
Yamanobe	山辺町	61.36	14,147	230.56	Higashimurayama District	Town	
Yuza	遊佐町	208.39	13,615	65.33	Akumi District	Town	

== Climate ==
The climate of Yamagata Prefecture is characterized by long, hot, and humid summers and long, snowy winters. Both spring and autumn are short, the former often cold, the latter often warm, but both quite dry and sunny. Yamagata Prefecture, along with northern parts of Miyagi and Iwate are the transition areas from humid subtropical climate (Koppen Cfa/Cwa) to humid continental within the Japan mainland. Winter temperatures rarely fall below −10 °C (14 °F) in populated areas; they frequently rise above 30 °C (86 °F) in July and August. Precipitation falls all year round and the remnants of one or perhaps two typhoons usually pass through between August and October. The winters see heavy snowfall especially at higher elevations, though the Japan Sea coast (Sakata) is milder and has more rain. Snowfall for Shinjō is typical of populated mountainous areas, snowfall for Yamagata City typical of the valleys. The central mountains around Gassan may see as much as 3,000 centimetres (98.43 ft) of snow in a season with depths up to 8 metres (26 ft) at higher elevations.

Climate data for Yamagata, Yamagata
Month	Jan	Feb	Mar	Apr	May	Jun	Jul	Aug	Sep	Oct	Nov	Dec	Year
Record high °C (°F)	18.1 (64.6)	17.3 (63.1)	23.7 (74.7)	33.3 (91.9)	33.4 (92.1)	35.6 (96.1)	40.8 (105.4)	38.9 (102.0)	36.1 (97.0)	32.3 (90.1)	26.9 (80.4)	20.1 (68.2)	40.8 (105.4)
Mean daily maximum °C (°F)	3 (37)	4 (39)	8 (46)	16 (61)	22 (72)	25 (77)	28 (82)	30 (86)	25 (77)	19 (66)	12 (54)	6 (43)	16 (61)
Mean daily minimum °C (°F)	−4 (25)	−4 (25)	−1 (30)	4 (39)	10 (50)	15 (59)	19 (66)	20 (68)	16 (61)	9 (48)	3 (37)	−1 (30)	7 (45)
Record low °C (°F)	−20.0 (−4.0)	−19.0 (−2.2)	−15.5 (4.1)	−7.3 (18.9)	−1.8 (28.8)	3.0 (37.4)	6.7 (44.1)	8.4 (47.1)	3.0 (37.4)	−2.4 (27.7)	−7.2 (19.0)	−15.0 (5.0)	−20.0 (−4.0)
Average precipitation mm (inches)	75 (3.0)	70 (2.8)	67 (2.6)	68 (2.7)	81 (3.2)	103 (4.1)	144 (5.7)	149 (5.9)	134 (5.3)	76 (3.0)	81 (3.2)	77 (3.0)	1,125 (44.3)
Average snowfall cm (inches)	163 (64)	147 (58)	71 (28)	3 (1.2)	0 (0)	0 (0)	0 (0)	0 (0)	0 (0)	0 (0)	12 (4.7)	92 (36)	491 (193)
Source: Japan Meteorological Agency

Climate data for Shinjō, Yamagata
Month	Jan	Feb	Mar	Apr	May	Jun	Jul	Aug	Sep	Oct	Nov	Dec	Year
Record high °C (°F)	13.3 (55.9)	14.0 (57.2)	19.5 (67.1)	30.2 (86.4)	33.5 (92.3)	32.6 (90.7)	36.9 (98.4)	37.4 (99.3)	33.9 (93.0)	27.9 (82.2)	22.5 (72.5)	19.0 (66.2)	37.4 (99.3)
Mean daily maximum °C (°F)	1 (34)	2 (36)	6 (43)	14 (57)	20 (68)	24 (75)	27 (81)	29 (84)	24 (75)	18 (64)	11 (52)	4 (39)	15 (59)
Mean daily minimum °C (°F)	−4 (25)	−4 (25)	−2 (28)	3 (37)	9 (48)	14 (57)	19 (66)	20 (68)	15 (59)	8 (46)	3 (37)	−1 (30)	7 (45)
Record low °C (°F)	−19.6 (−3.3)	−20.2 (−4.4)	−16.5 (2.3)	−9.3 (15.3)	−2.1 (28.2)	3.7 (38.7)	7.6 (45.7)	10.9 (51.6)	4.1 (39.4)	−0.8 (30.6)	−5.8 (21.6)	−15.2 (4.6)	−20.2 (−4.4)
Average precipitation mm (inches)	181 (7.1)	145 (5.7)	112 (4.4)	98 (3.9)	107 (4.2)	131 (5.2)	186 (7.3)	175 (6.9)	153 (6.0)	152 (6.0)	195 (7.7)	211 (8.3)	1,843 (72.6)
Average snowfall cm (inches)	283 (111)	242 (95)	134 (53)	20 (7.9)	0 (0)	0 (0)	0 (0)	0 (0)	0 (0)	0 (0)	28 (11)	168 (66)	878 (346)
Source: Japan Meteorological Agency

Climate data for Sakata, Yamagata
Month	Jan	Feb	Mar	Apr	May	Jun	Jul	Aug	Sep	Oct	Nov	Dec	Year
Record high °C (°F)	15.5 (59.9)	21.6 (70.9)	22.6 (72.7)	28.6 (83.5)	31.3 (88.3)	31.8 (89.2)	36.9 (98.4)	40.1 (104.2)	35.1 (95.2)	30.9 (87.6)	24.2 (75.6)	19.0 (66.2)	40.1 (104.2)
Mean daily maximum °C (°F)	4 (39)	4 (39)	8 (46)	14 (57)	19 (66)	23 (73)	27 (81)	29 (84)	25 (77)	19 (66)	13 (55)	8 (46)	16 (61)
Mean daily minimum °C (°F)	−1 (30)	−2 (28)	1 (34)	5 (41)	11 (52)	16 (61)	20 (68)	21 (70)	17 (63)	10 (50)	5 (41)	1 (34)	9 (48)
Record low °C (°F)	−16.9 (1.6)	−12.8 (9.0)	−9.9 (14.2)	−3.7 (25.3)	−0.2 (31.6)	7.5 (45.5)	9.5 (49.1)	13.2 (55.8)	7.0 (44.6)	1.4 (34.5)	−5.1 (22.8)	−12.5 (9.5)	−16.9 (1.6)
Average precipitation mm (inches)	153 (6.0)	115 (4.5)	104 (4.1)	106 (4.2)	117 (4.6)	128 (5.0)	186 (7.3)	176 (6.9)	185 (7.3)	174 (6.9)	224 (8.8)	202 (8.0)	1,861 (73.3)
Average snowfall cm (inches)	138 (54)	120 (47)	43 (17)	1 (0.4)	0 (0)	0 (0)	0 (0)	0 (0)	0 (0)	0 (0)	10 (3.9)	64 (25)	375 (148)
Source: Japan Meteorological Agency

== Economy ==
=== Fruit ===
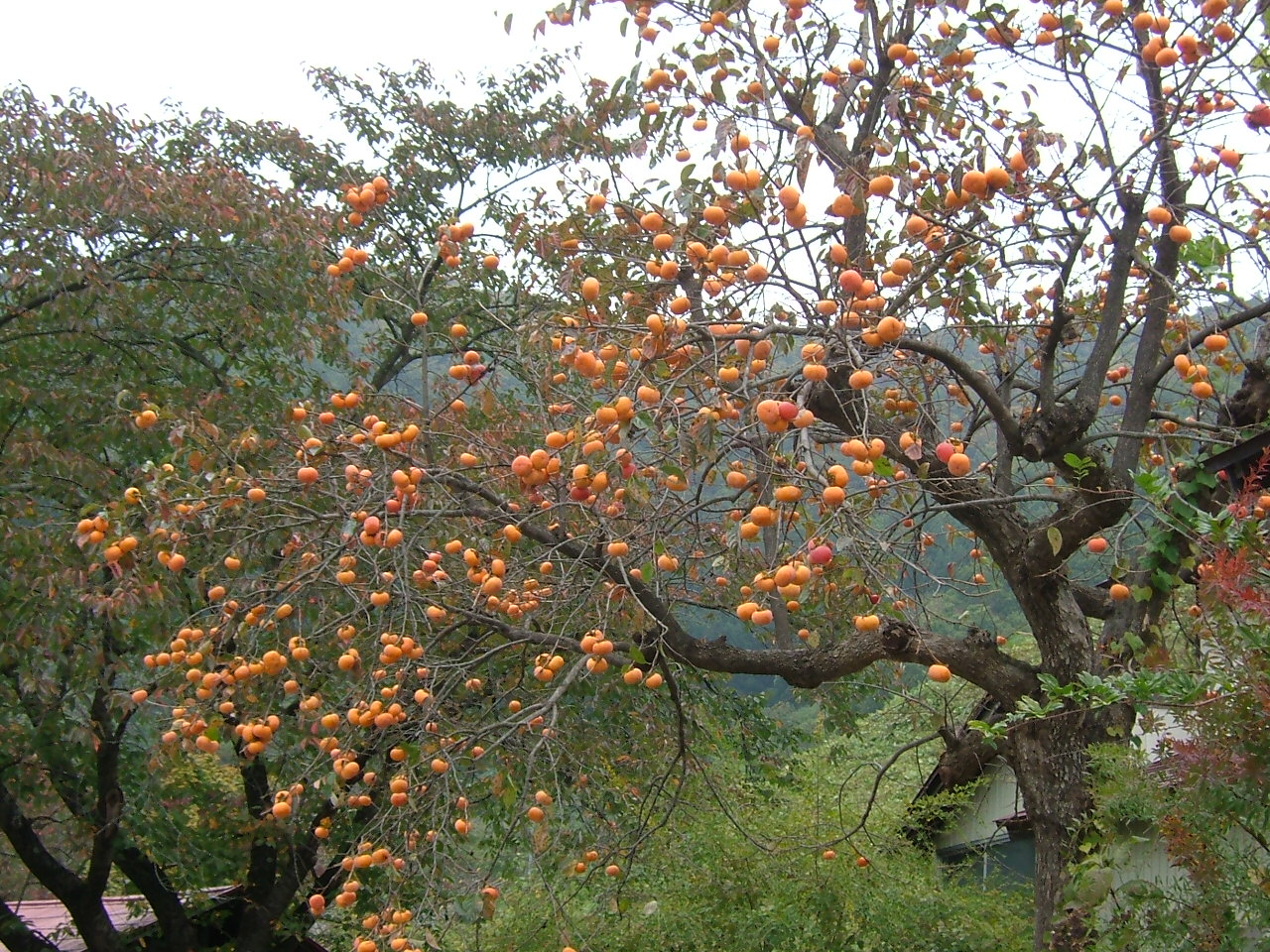
Persimmons in October, Yamagata Prefecture.

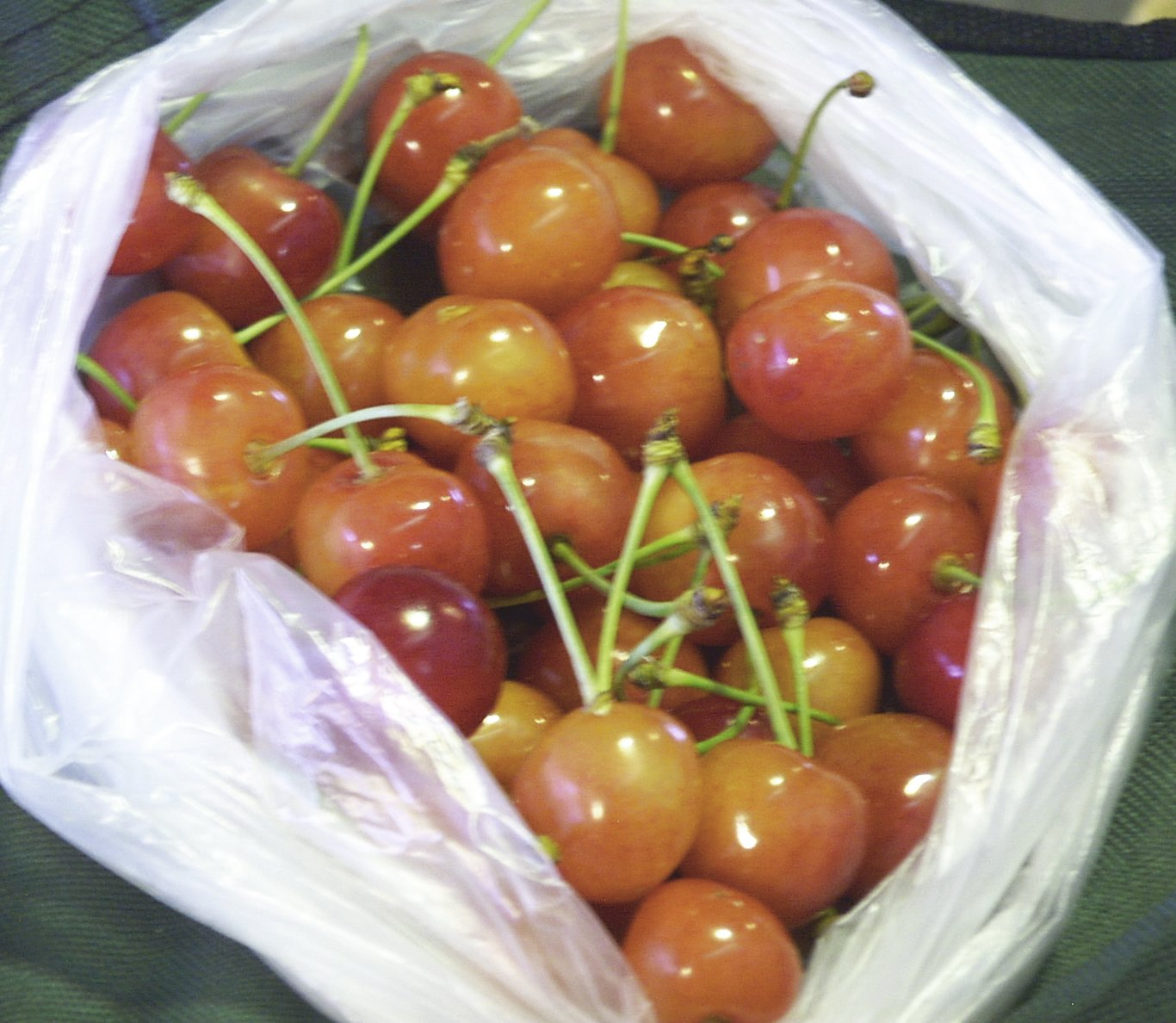
Yamagata cherries, such as these, often sell for US$30 per pound or more.

Yamagata Prefecture is the largest producer of cherries and pears in Japan. A large quantity of other kinds of fruits such as grapes, apples, peaches, melons, persimmons and watermelons are also produced.

== Demographics ==
Yamagata prefecture population pyramid in 2020

As of the 2020 census, Yamagata Prefecture had a population of 1,068,027. As of the latest estimates in October 2024, 10.4% of the population was under the age of 15, 54.0% was between 15 and 64, and 35.6% was over 65, with 16.0% aged 65 to 74, and 19.6% aged 75 or older.

Yamagata prefecture experienced its greatest growth period following the end of World War II, but then quickly began to slow down and eventually decline steadily.

In May 2025, the Yamagata prefectural government announced that the estimated population had fallen below 1 million. This marks the lowest population level recorded in the prefecture since the 1920 census.

Historical population

Year	Pop.	±%
1890	742,600	—
1920	968,925	+30.5%
1925	1,027,297	+6.0%
1930	1,080,034	+5.1%
1935	1,116,822	+3.4%
1940	1,118,153	+0.1%
1947	1,335,653	+19.5%
1950	1,357,347	+1.6%
1955	1,353,649	−0.3%
1960	1,320,664	−2.4%
1965	1,263,103	−4.4%

Year	Pop.	±%
1970	1,225,618	−3.0%
1975	1,220,302	−0.4%
1980	1,251,917	+2.6%
1985	1,261,662	+0.8%
1990	1,258,390	−0.3%
1995	1,256,958	−0.1%
2000	1,244,147	−1.0%
2005	1,216,181	−2.2%
2010	1,168,924	−3.9%
2015	1,123,891	−3.9%
2020	1,068,027	−5.0%

Source: Statistics Bureau

== Notable people ==
- Date Masamune (1567–1636), daimyō of the Sendai Domain
- Inoue Hisashi (1934–2010), novelist, playwright, and essayist
- Kazunobu Mineta (born 1977), singer-songwriter; lead singer of punk rock band Ging Nang Boyz
- Ogata Taketora (1888–1956), journalist and politician; Deputy Prime Minister of Japan
- Shozo Sasahara (1929–2023), Olympic gold medalist in freestyle wrestling
- Shizue Tatsuta (1903–1962), silent film actress
- Yoshihiro Togashi (born 1966), manga artist, creator of Hunter x Hunter and YuYu Hakusho

== City life ==
Yamagata City is the central hub for Yamagata Prefecture and has many shops and restaurants around its main station. It is also the location with the most western hotels and the primary place of lodging for visitors visiting this region. This city serves as a good hub to visit the surrounding cities and towns around this prefecture with bus lines and train lines linking almost every part of Yamagata from the station.

There are many bars near the station giving this city,night life for visitors to enjoy at the station as well as the Nanukamachi district in the downtown area of the city.

=== Festivals and events ===
Yamagata Prefecture has a number of annual festivals and events.

The largest is the Yamagata Hanagasa Festival (花笠祭り) which takes place in Yamagata City on the first weekend in August, when thousands of people perform the hanagasa dance in the city centre and attracts up to 300,000 spectators. Yamagata City is the home of the bi-annual Yamagata International Documentary Film Festival in October.

In February, a snow lantern festival is held in Yonezawa at the Uesugi Shrine. Hundreds of candle-lit lanterns light pathways dug into the snow around the shrine. Yonezawa is also the site of the Uesugi Festival (上杉祭り, uesugi matsuri) in mid-spring. The festival's highlight is a re-enactment of the Battle of Kawanakajima on the banks of the Matsukawa River.

In September, Yamagata Prefecture is famous for its imoni, a taro-root stew popular in Northern Japan during the autumn. Imonikai, taro-root soup parties, are very popular during this season, and many tourists come to Yamagata Prefecture specifically for its particular style of imoni.

=== Art ===
Beginning in 2003, Yamagata city officials with the aid of Tōhoku University of Art and Design began a three-year project in which the Buddhist art of the city's temples would be catalogued and compared to a set of guidelines in order to identify "cultural assets". One hundred and ninety temples have had their works of art examined and several significant examples of Buddhist sculpture have been discovered. At Heisenji Temple, in the Hirashimizu district, a particularly rare statue, a seated Vairocana Buddha made from zelkova wood, was found. Other significant works include sculptures from the Heian period (794–1185) and Kamakura period (1192–1333).

The Yamagata Museum of Art, located in Yamagata City, was opened in 1964 through the efforts of a foundation led by Yoshio Hattori, the president of Yamagata Shimbun and Yamagata Broadcasting Co, Ltd. The permanent collection consists of three types of art: Japanese and Asian, regional, and French. Special exhibitions are held periodically.

=== Language ===
Yamagata Prefecture is known for its local dialect Yamagata-ben, sometimes thought of as backward sounding in other parts of Japan. The 2004 movie Swing Girls (スウィングガールズ), co-written and directed by Shinobu Yaguchi, is set in Yamagata and makes use of Yamagata-ben for comedic purposes.

== Sports ==
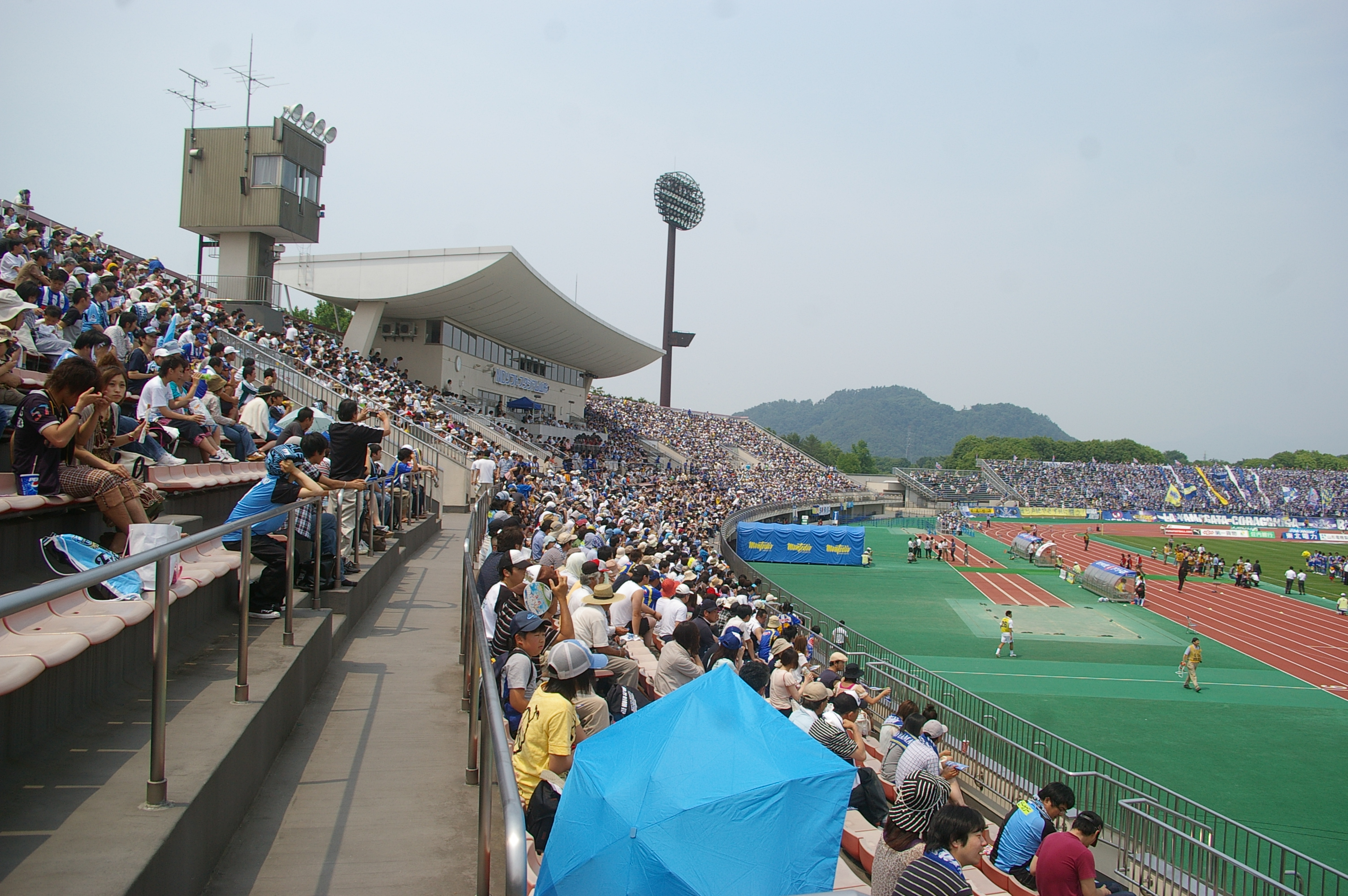
ND Soft Stadium Yamagata, home of Montedio Yamagata.

The sports teams listed below are based in Yamagata.

Football

- Montedio Yamagata

Volleyball

- Pioneer Red Wings (Tendō)

Basketball

- Passlab Yamagata Wyverns

== Transportation ==
=== Airports ===
- Shonai Airport (Tokyo, Osaka, Sapporo by All Nippon Airways)
- Yamagata Airport (Tokyo, Osaka, Nagoya, Sapporo by Japan Airlines)

=== Railways ===
- Aterazawa Line
- Flower Nagai Line
- Ōu Main Line
- Rikuu East Line
- Rikuu West Line
- Senzan Line
- Uetsu Main Line
- Yamagata Shinkansen
- Yonesaka Line

== Tourism ==
The temple of Yama-dera, carved into the mountainside near the city of Yamagata, is a major attraction.

The Dewa Sanzan are three holy mountains that form a traditional pilgrimage for followers of the Shugendō branch of Shintō. The famous Gojudo (five-story pagoda) is at the base of Mount Haguro, the lowest of the three mountains.

Mount Zaō is a famous winter ski resort, also known for its snow monsters (frozen snow-covered trees) in the winter, and the Okama crater lake, also known as the Goshiki Numa (Five Color Lake) because its colour changes according to the weather.

Ginzan Onsen (銀山温泉) is a Silver Mountain hot spring town located in the mountains of Obanazawa City, Yamagata Prefecture. The area originally developed around a silver mine.

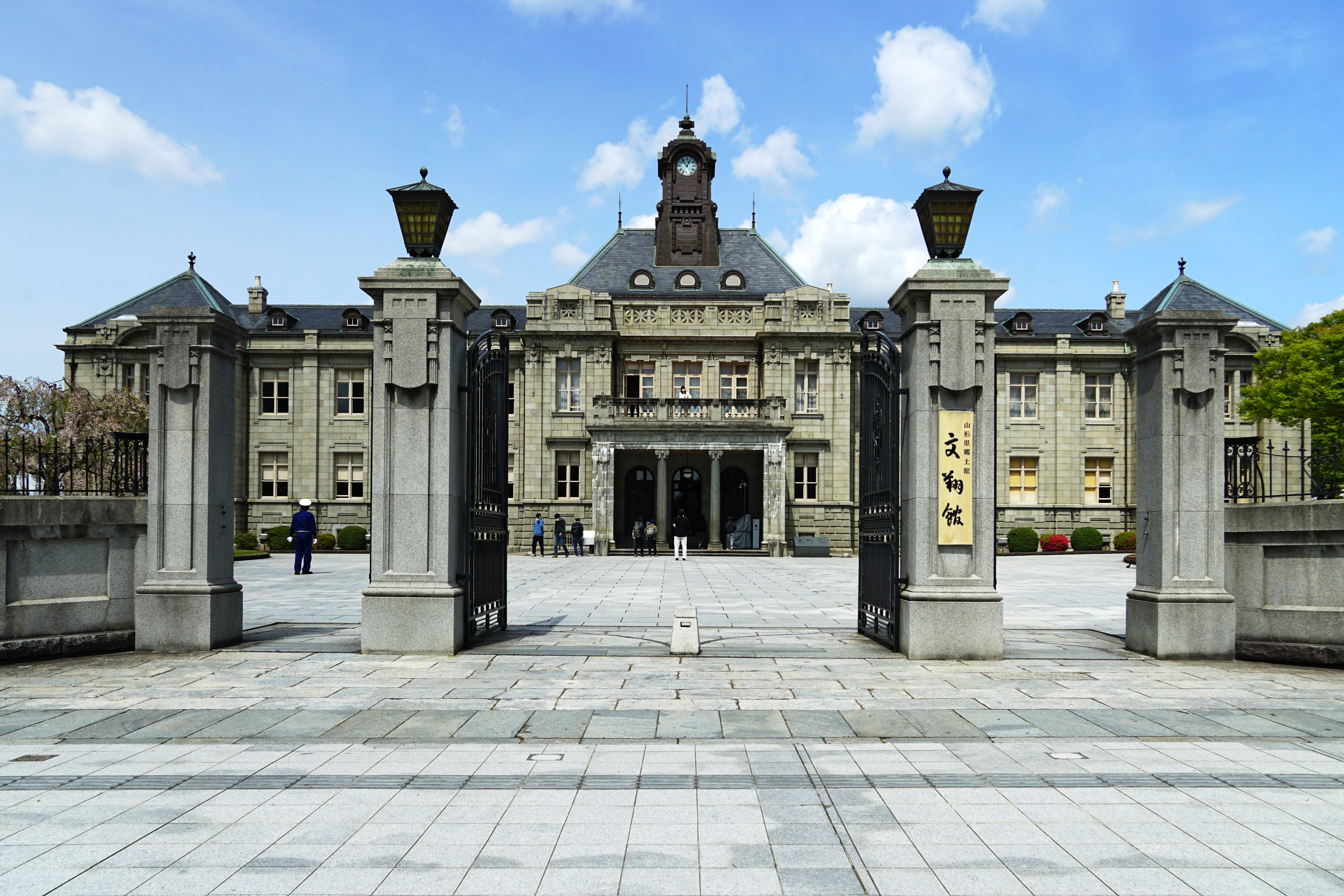
Former Yamagata Prefectural Office

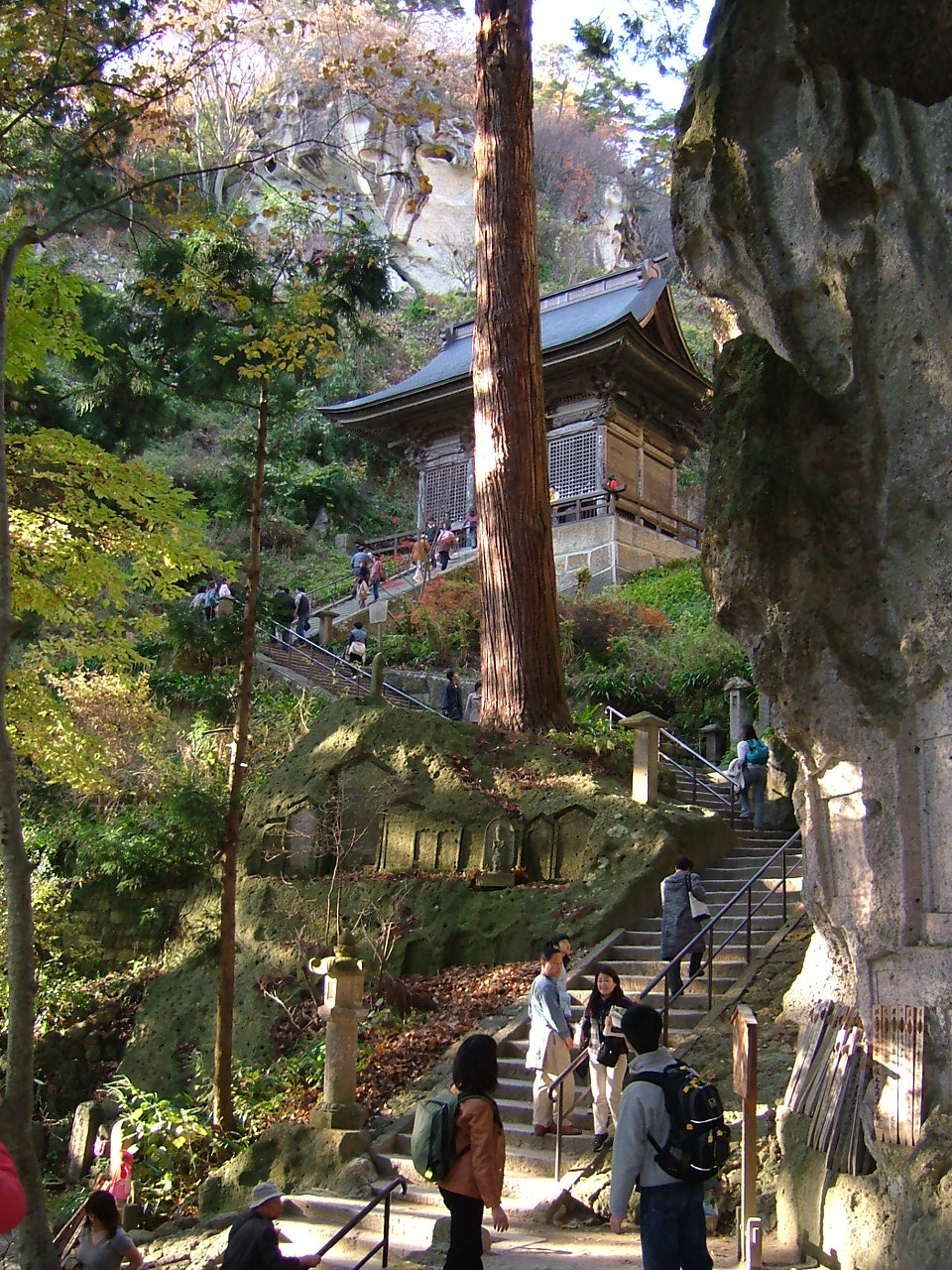
Yamadera niōmon

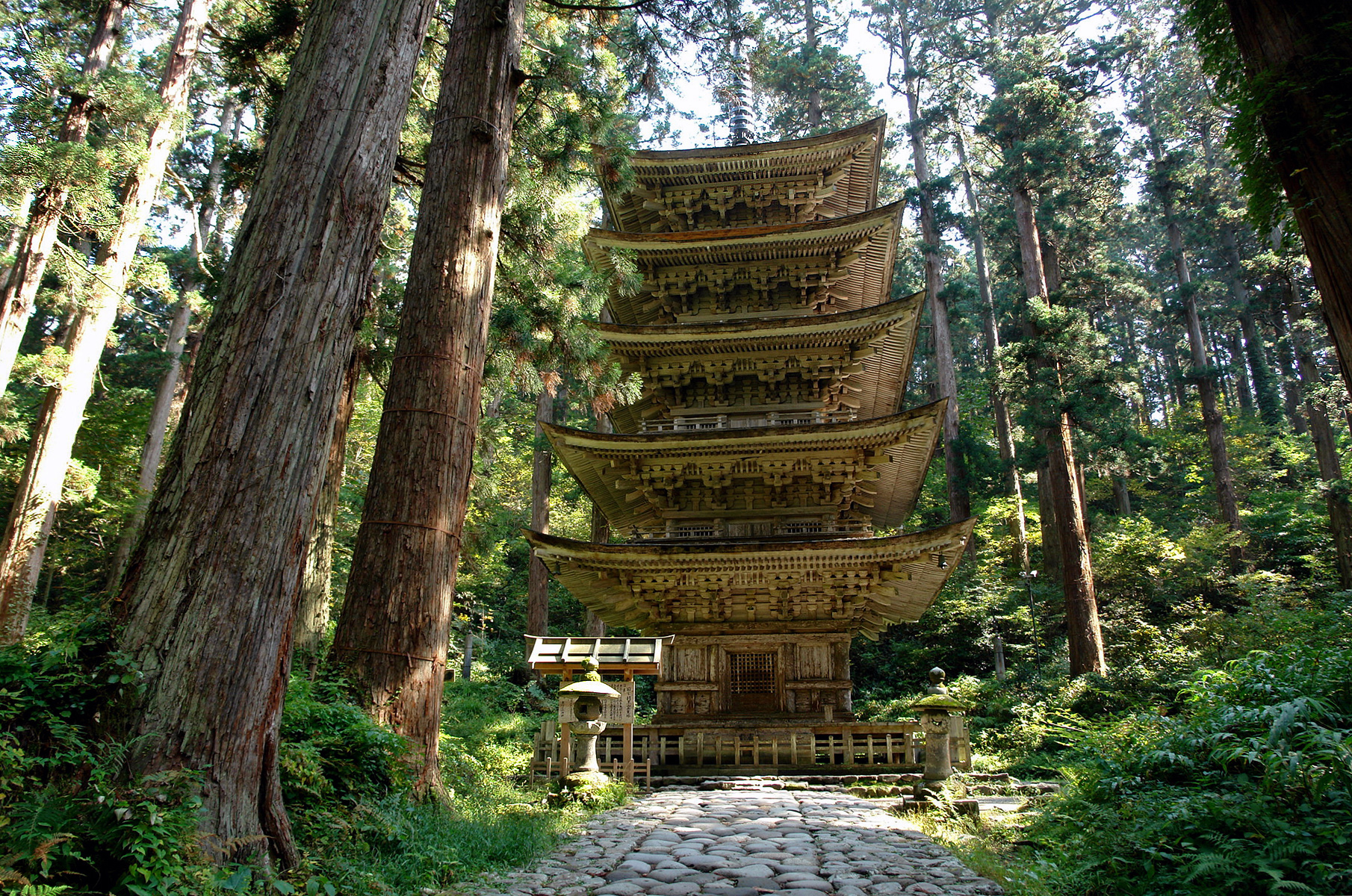
Mount Haguro, The Gojuto Pagoda

Ginzan Onsen Spa

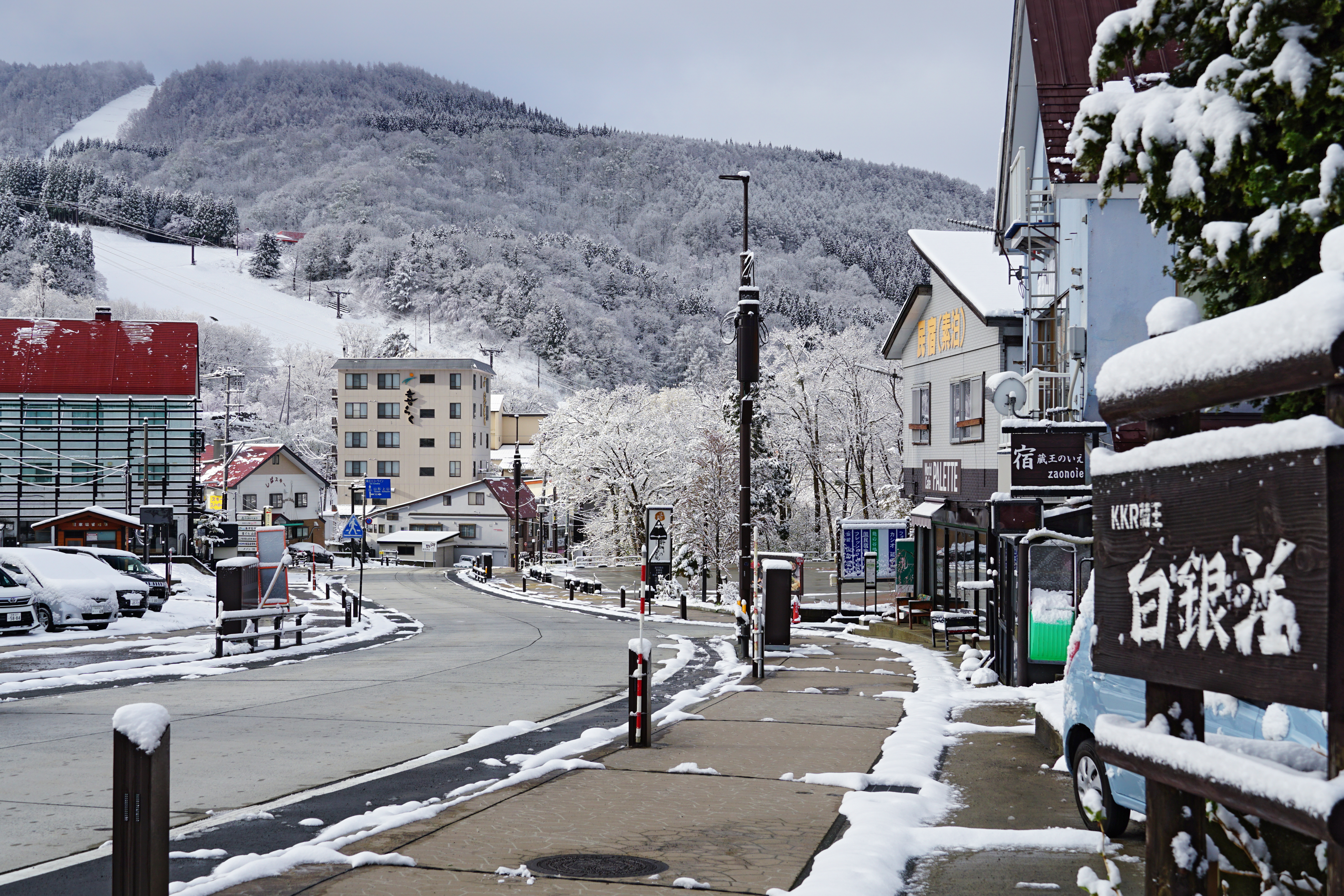
Zaō Onsen Ski Resort

== Media ==
=== Newspapers ===
- Okitama Times
- Shonai Nippo
- Yamagata Shimbun
- Yonezawa Shimbun

=== TV and radio ===
- Rhythm Station (JFN)
- SAY TV (FNN)
- TUY TV (JNN)
- YBC TV and Radio (NNN, JRN, and NRN)
- YTS TV (ANN)

=== Film ===
- Yamagata International Documentary Film Festival
- The Studio Ghibli film Only Yesterday (1991) is set in rural Yamagata, depicting a safflower harvest in the countryside. The film was directed by Isao Takahata.
