= Yamanobe =

Yamanobe may refer to:

- Yamanobe, Yamagata, in Japan
- Yamanobe Masato, a fictional character
