= Kennan Prefectural Natural Park =

Natural park in Yamagata Prefecture, Japan

- 県南県立自然公園
- Location within Yamagata Prefecture Location within Japan
- Location: Yamagata Prefecture, Japan
- Nearest town: Nan'yō, Takahata
- Coordinates: 38.02°N 140.23°E
- Area: 101.24 square kilometres (39.09 sq mi)
- Established: 1 September 1961

Kennan Prefectural Natural Park (県南県立自然公園, Kennan kenritsu shizen-kōen) is a Prefectural Natural Park in southeast Yamagata Prefecture, Japan. Established in 1961, the park spans the borders of the municipalities of Nan'yō and Takahata.

== See also ==
- National Parks of Japan
