= Shōnai Kaihin Prefectural Natural Park =

Natural park of Yamagata prefecture, Japan

Coordinates: 38°50′43″N 139°47′03″E

- 庄内海浜県立自然公園
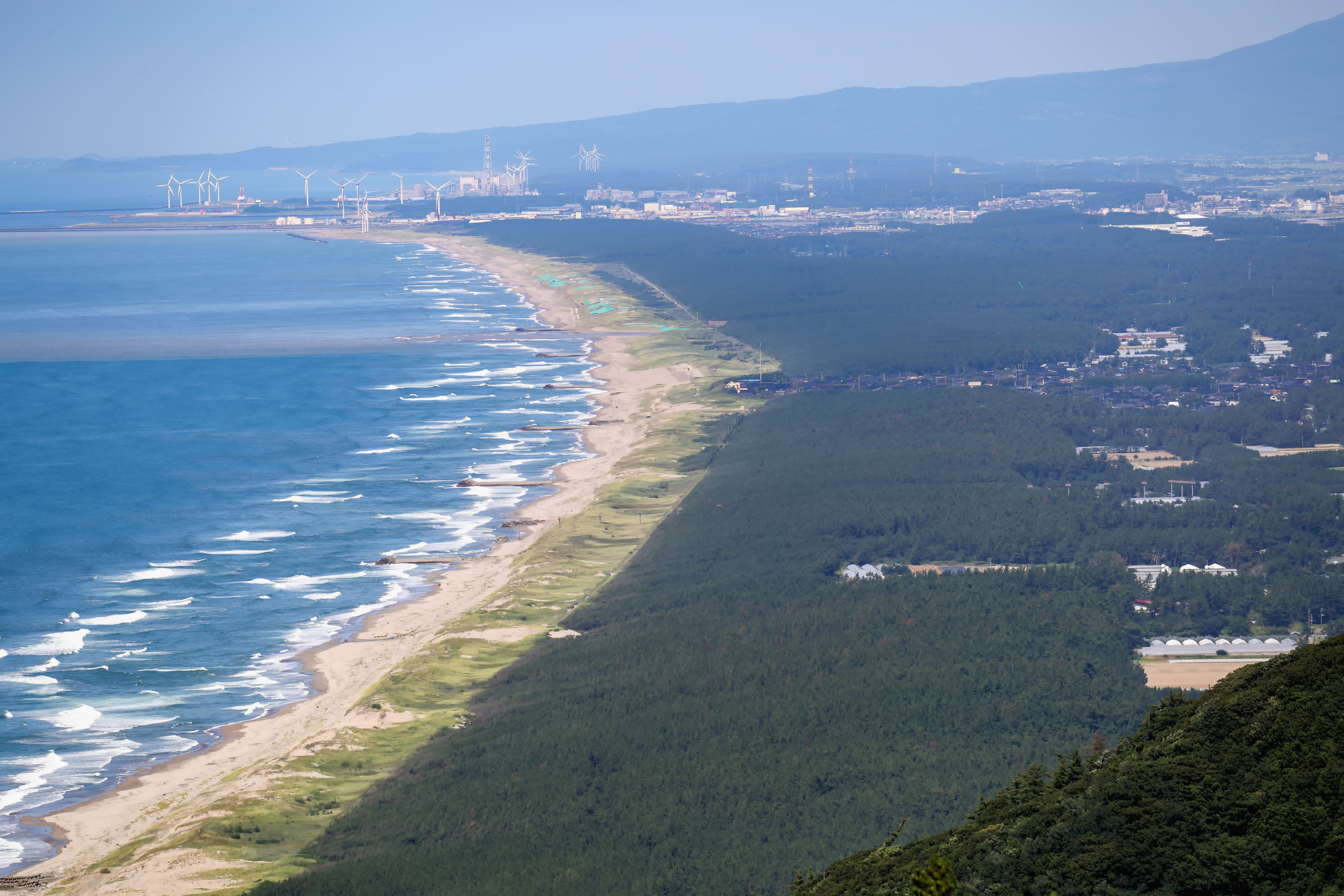
- Interactive map of Shōnai Kaihin Prefectural Natural Park
- Location: Yamagata Prefecture, Japan
- Nearest town: Sakata, Tsuruoka
- Area: 62.67 square kilometres (24.20 sq mi)
- Established: 5 August 1948

Shōnai Kaihin Prefectural Natural Park (庄内海浜県立自然公園, Shōnai Kaihin kenritsu shizen-kōen) is a Prefectural Natural Park in Yamagata Prefecture, Japan. Established in 1948, the park lies within the municipalities of Sakata and Tsuruoka. The park's central feature is the eponymous Shōnai coastline.

== See also ==
- National Parks of Japan
- Shōnai Domain
