= Ginzan Onsen =

Hot springs in Yamagata Prefecture, Japan

- Silver Mine Hot Springs
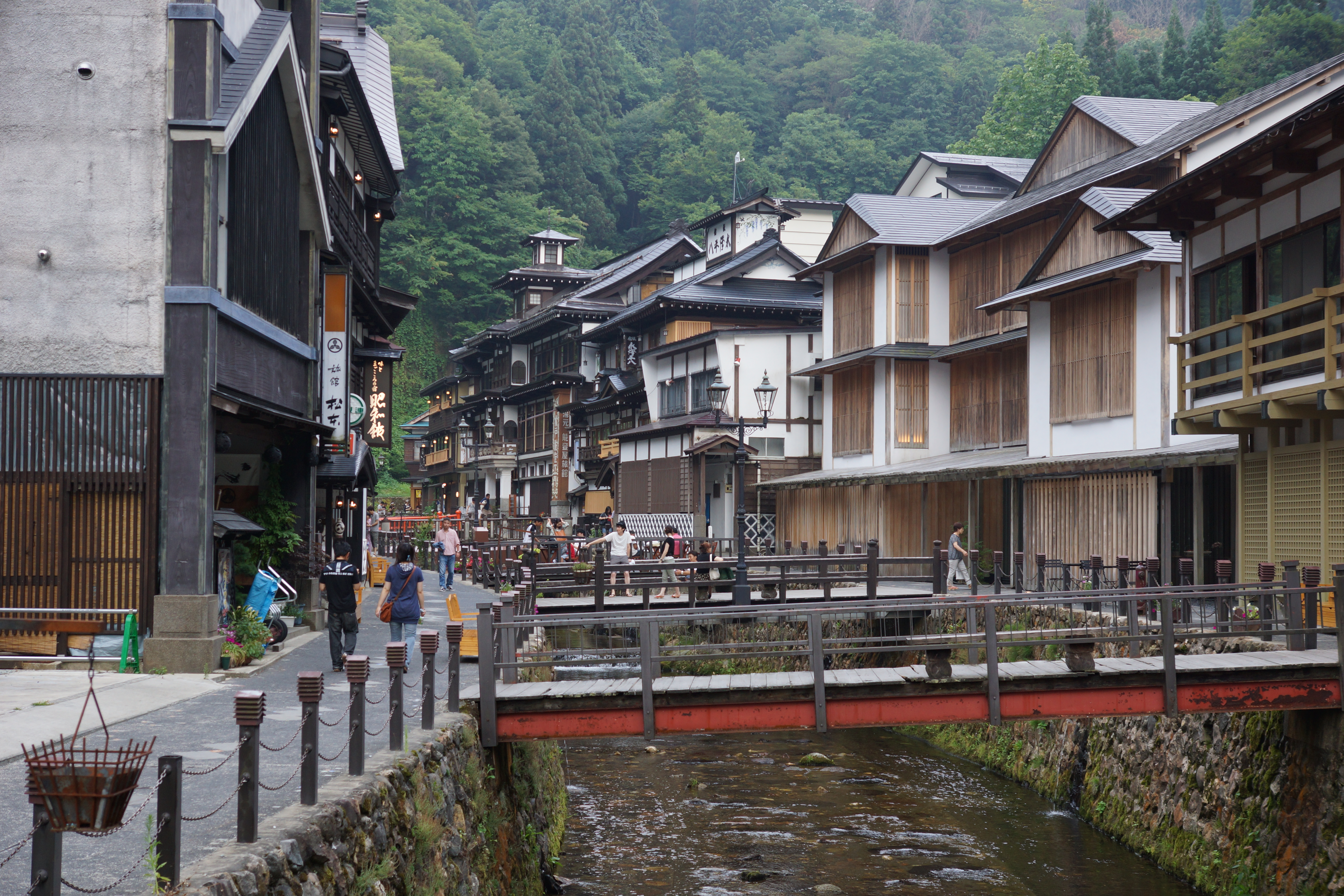

- Location within Japan
- Coordinates: 38°34′11″N 140°31′52″E
- Elevation: 399 m (1,309 ft)
- Type: geothermal, volcanic

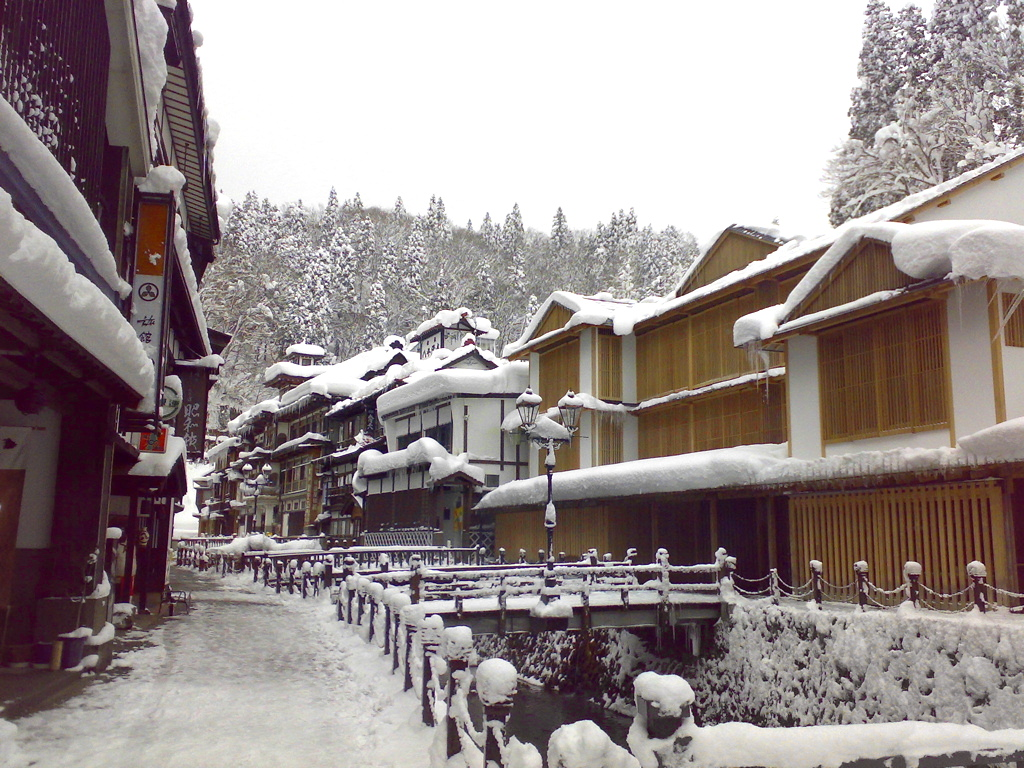
A winter day in Ginzan Onsen

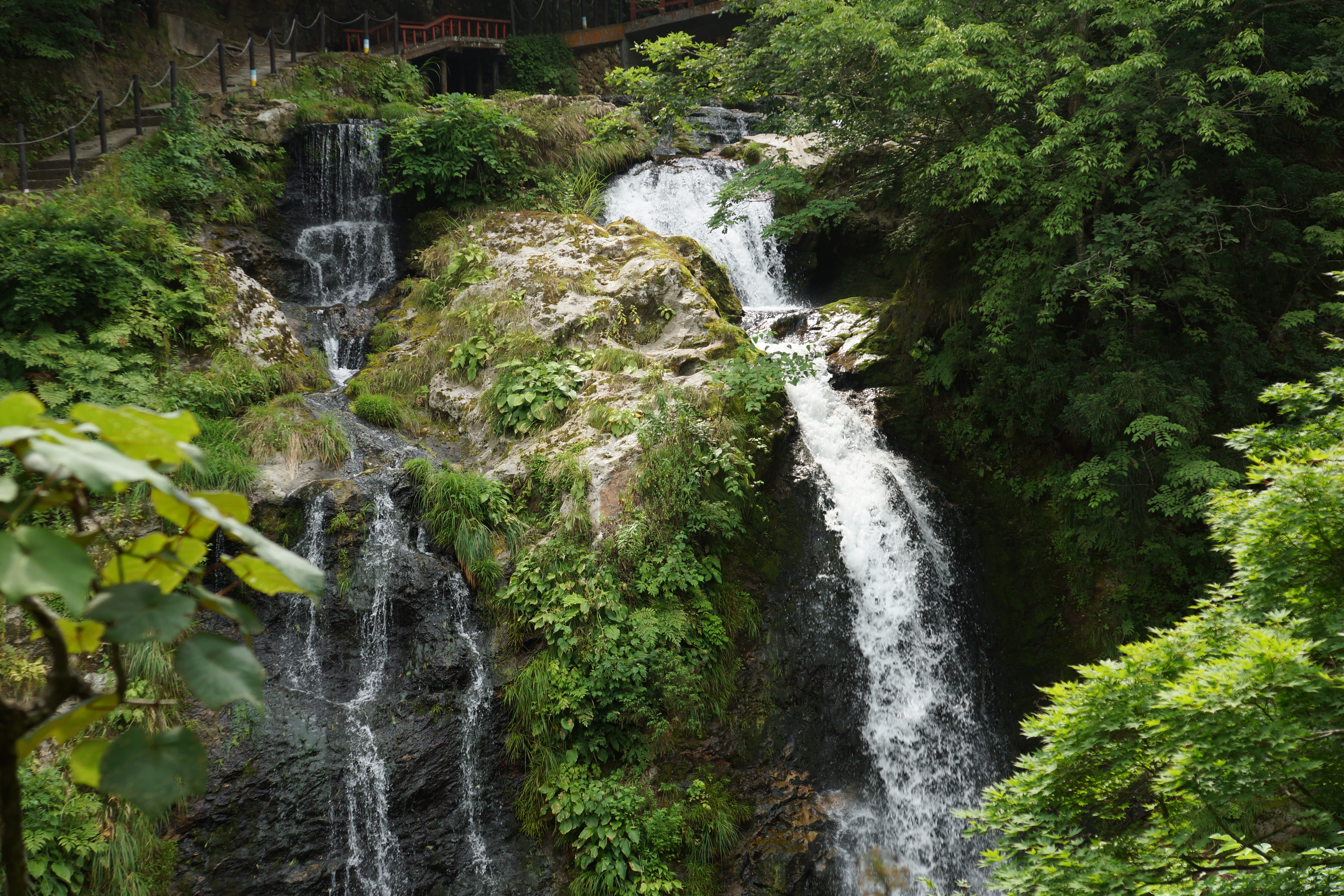
Shirogane-no-Taki Falls

Ginzan Onsen (銀山温泉) is an onsen (hot spring) area in Obanazawa, Yamagata Prefecture, Japan. Its name means "silver mine hot spring". Ginzan Onsen's economy grew due to silver mining and production and eventually transitioned to tourism when it opened dozens of hot spring resorts and ryokan along the central river that runs through the town. The mountains that surround this town yield rich hot spring water that is used both in the private hotels and public baths in the city centre.

The centre of town is a pedestrian-only district. After nightfall, the bridges and streets are lit by gaslight. In the winter Ginzan Onsen receives heavy snow. On the far side of town a 22-foot waterfall, Shirogane-no-Taki Falls, emerges from the mountains not far from the old silver mine, Nobesawa Ginzan. Internationally, this town saw a sharp rise in foreign tourism thanks to the famous snow-covered sights in the winter. There are no modern buildings within the town, the architecture is constructed from bare timber framing and white plaster, that were built during the Taisho Era (1912-1926).

There are two secluded public bathhouses (rotenburo), one of which was designed by Kuma Kengo, and a foot bath (warashiyu). Additionally some of the local ryokan permit non-lodging guests to use their indoor hot spring baths. There is a doukutsu (cave hot spring) at one of the establishments in town.

== History ==
The hot springs were first discovered 500 years ago by miners working in the nearby silver mines. The Onsen town was founded more than 400 years ago. When silver production waned toward the end of the 17th-century, use of the hot springs declined. Later, in the early 20th century, tourism flourished in the onsen town, and several wooden ryokan, some of them multiple-storeied, were built along the banks of the Ginzan River that flows through town.

Ginzan Onsen became nationally famous as it was featured in the popular television drama Oshin, and in the film, Spirited Away. Each year this onsen village sees hundreds of thousands of domestic Japanese visitors.

Fossils from the Miocene era have been found in the vicinity.

== Design ==
The Japanese architect Kengo Kuma, reconfigured and redesigned a 100-year old, 10,000 square-foot onsen hotel, Fujiya, by "grafting modern elements" onto the historic structure creating a hybrid of old and new that has been called "radical and subtle." His design retained the original post-and-beam facade, adding a sliding glass entry wall, a 2-story high atrium space, larger windows and reflecting pools.

== Access ==
Access to this town requires riding a bus or taking a short taxi ride from the JR Oishida Station on the JR Yamagata Shinkansen from Tokyo. Busses depart every other hour from Oishida Station to the town of Ginzan Onsen. Travellers can use the following train passes: Japan Rail Pass, JR East Tohoku Area Pass and JR East South Hokkaido Pass; the bus ride is not included. Alternatively, a car can be rented from various stations along the Yamagata Shinkansen line, and park just outside of town.

== Water profile ==
The hot spring water has a sulphur spring (硫黄温泉) and sulphate spring (硫酸温泉) profiles, and has a clear appearance with a slightly salty taste. It is claimed to have balneotheraputic properties for chronic skin diseases.

== Gallery ==
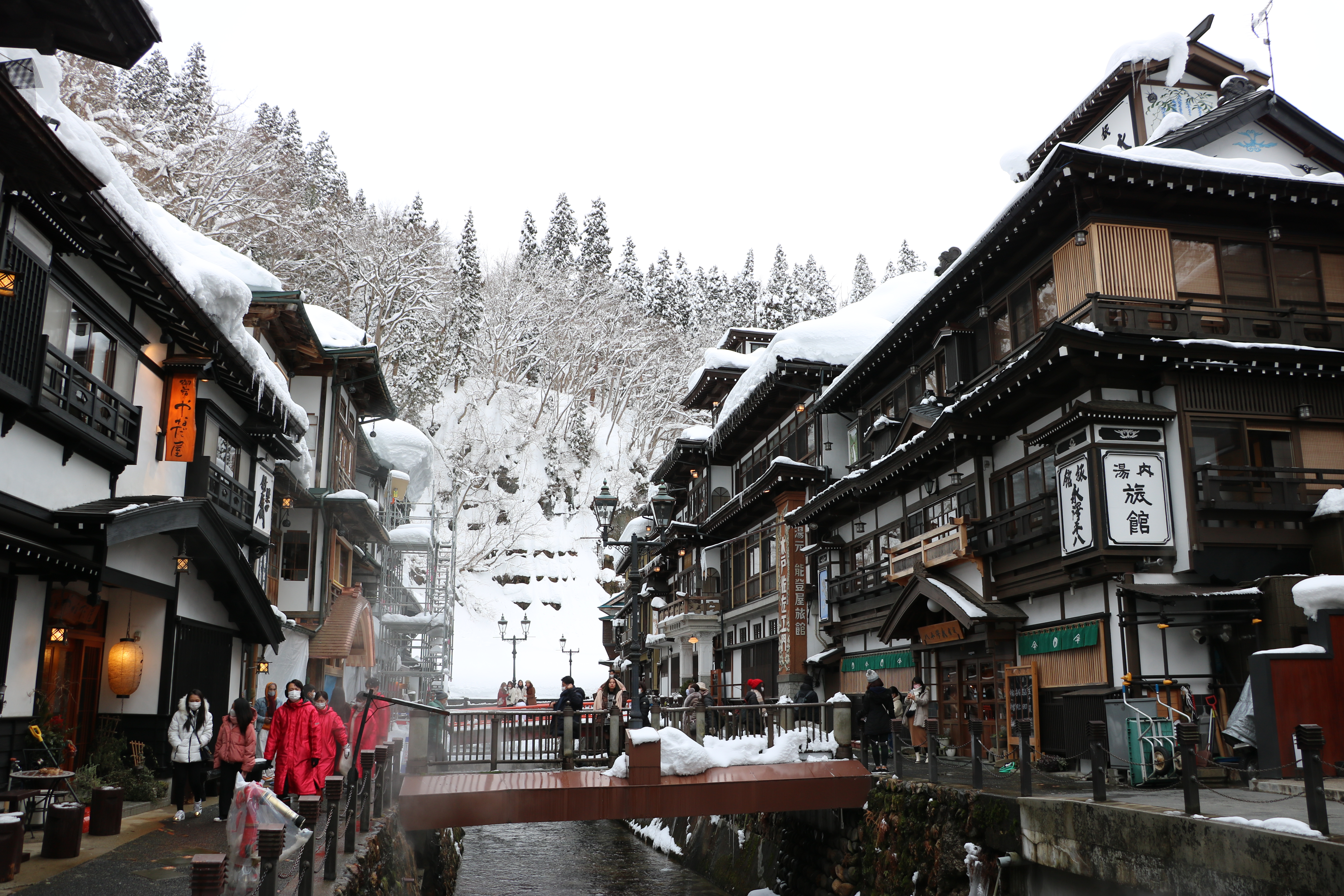

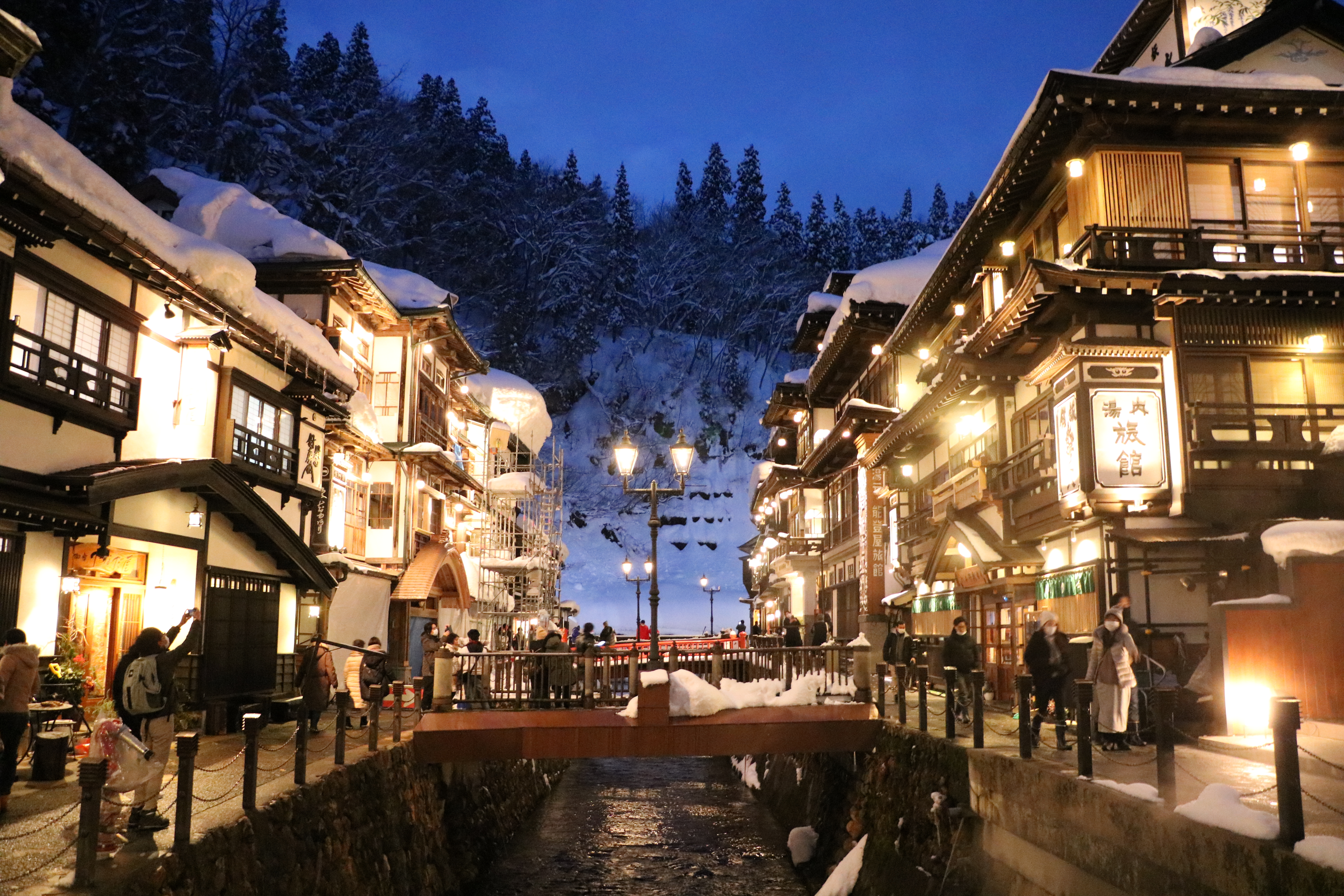

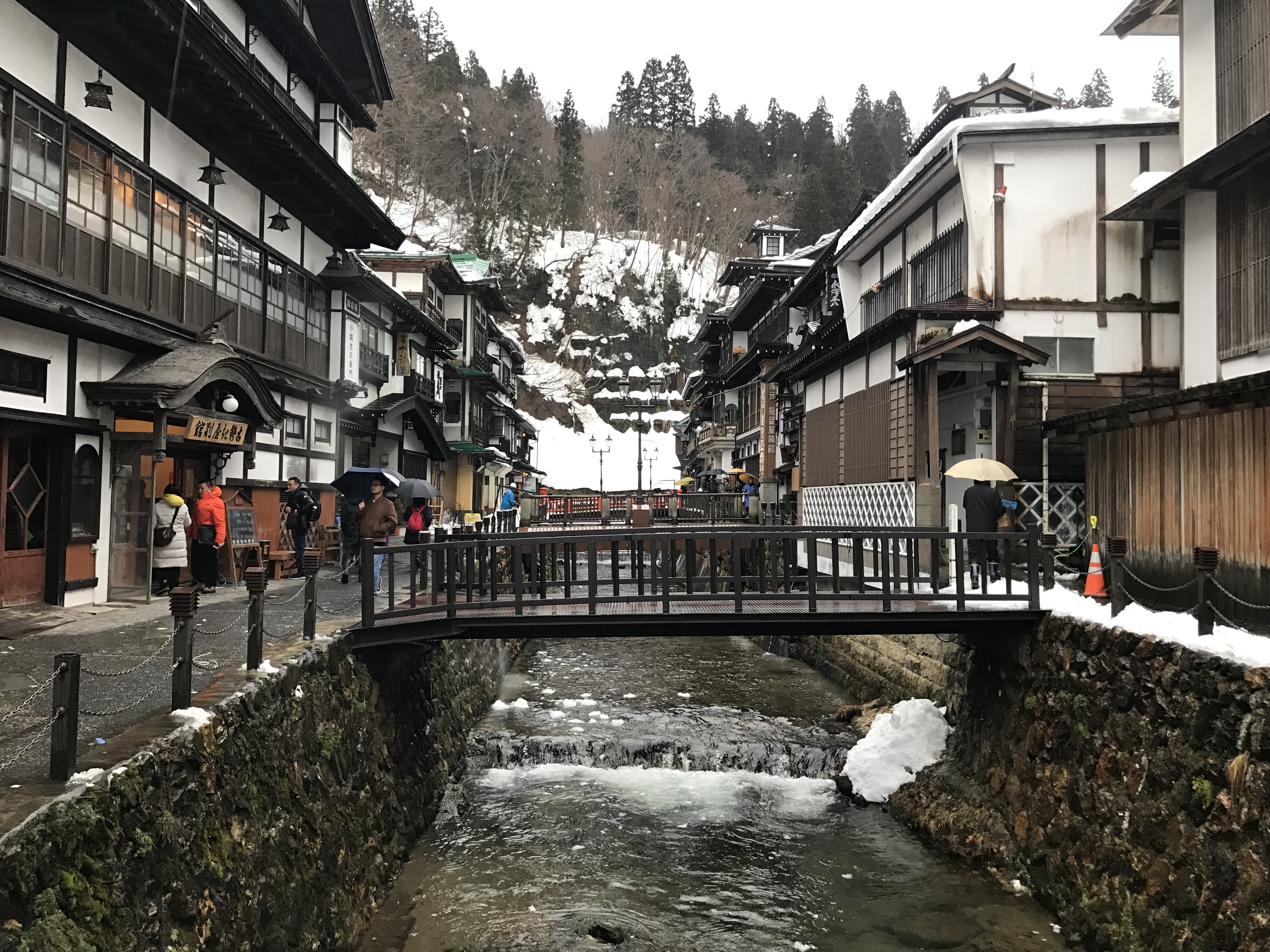

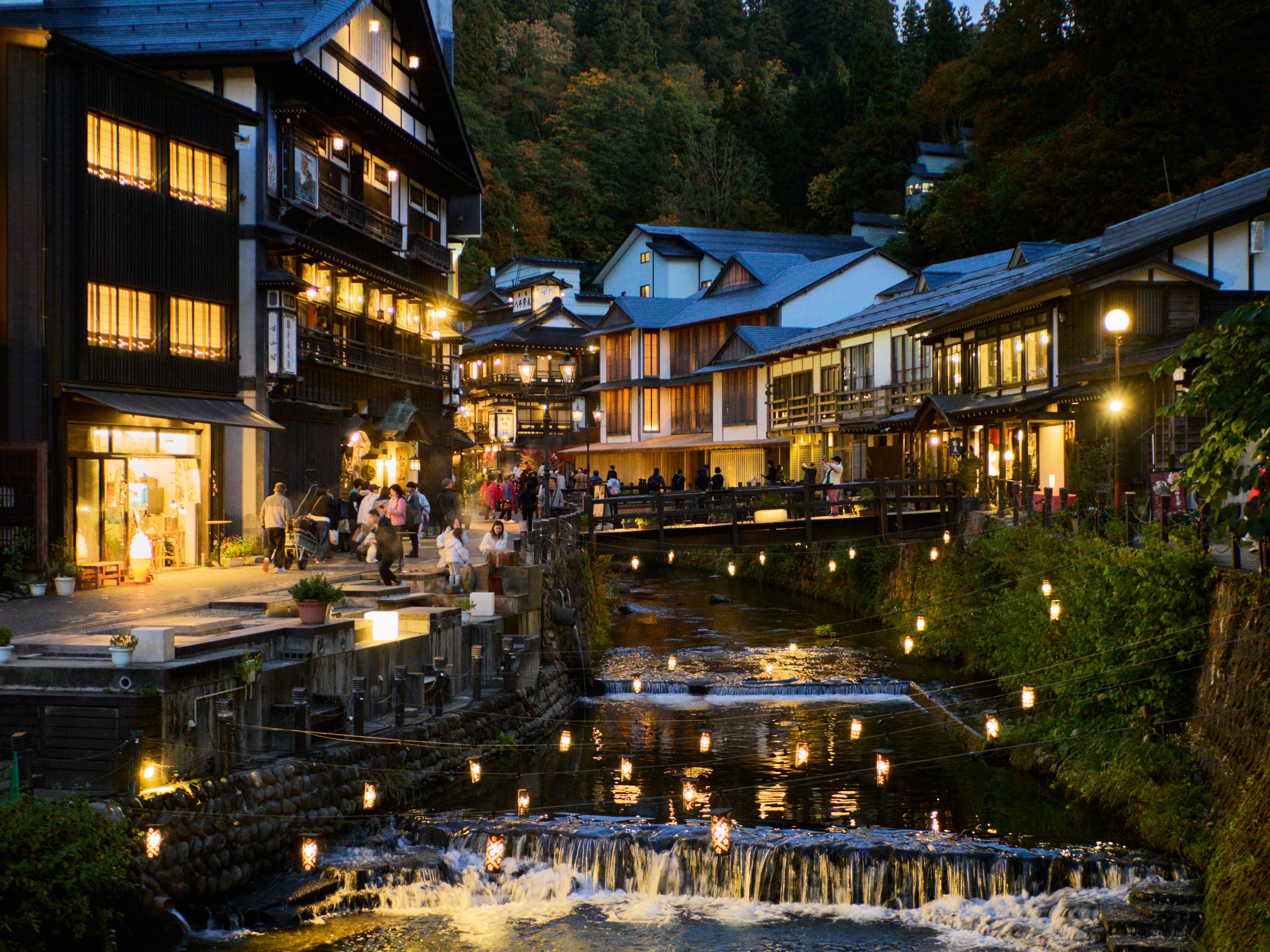

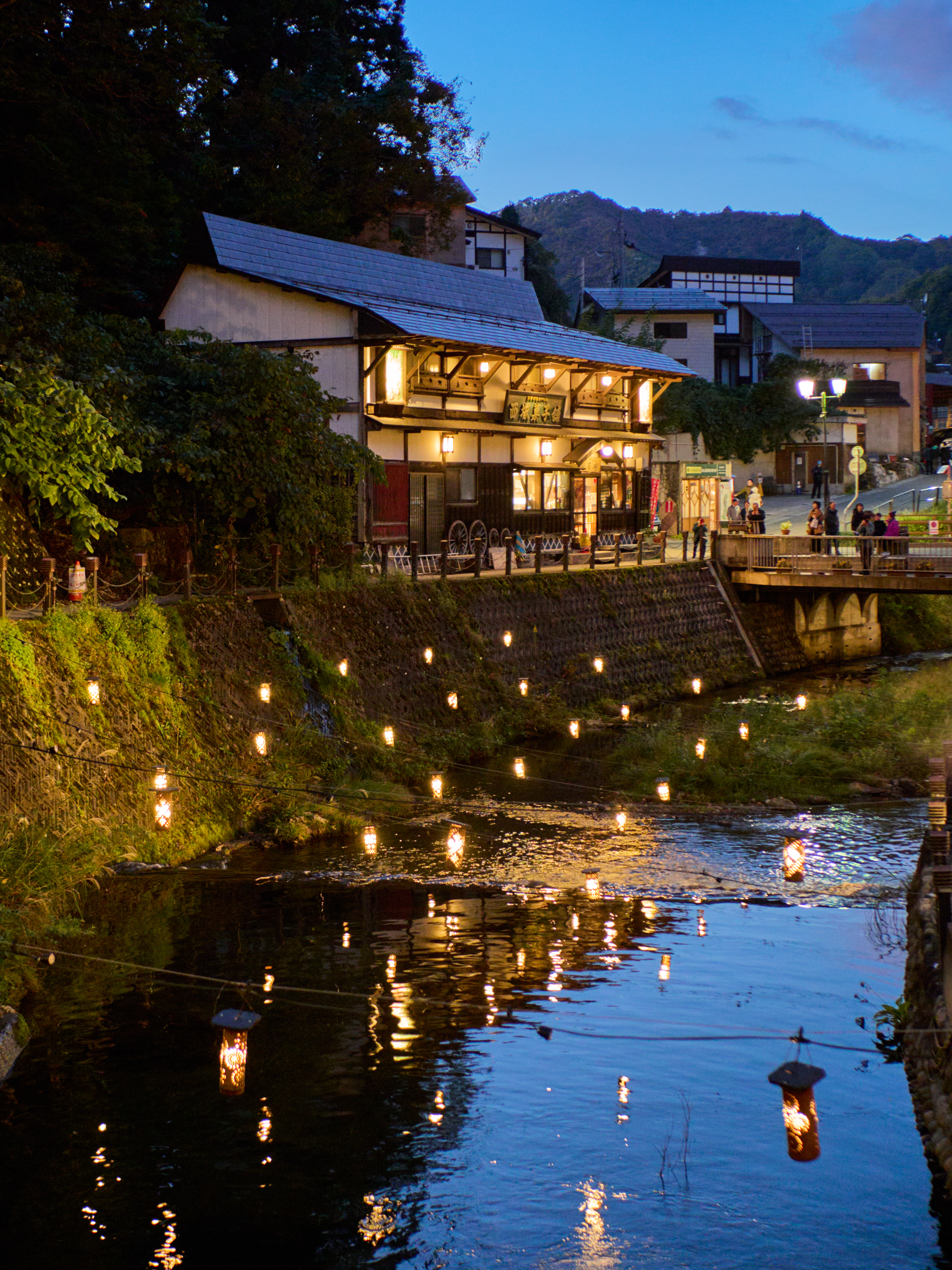

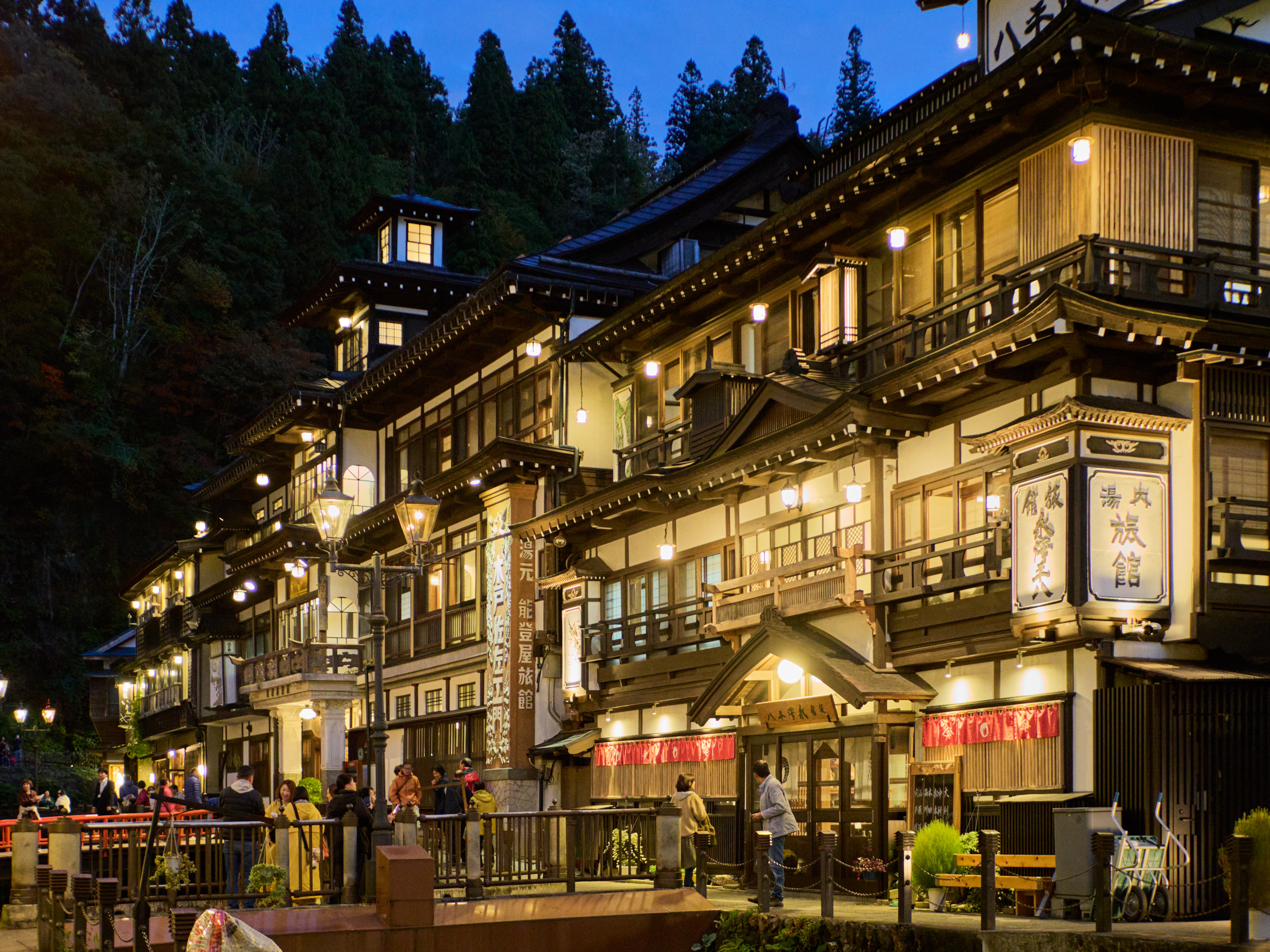

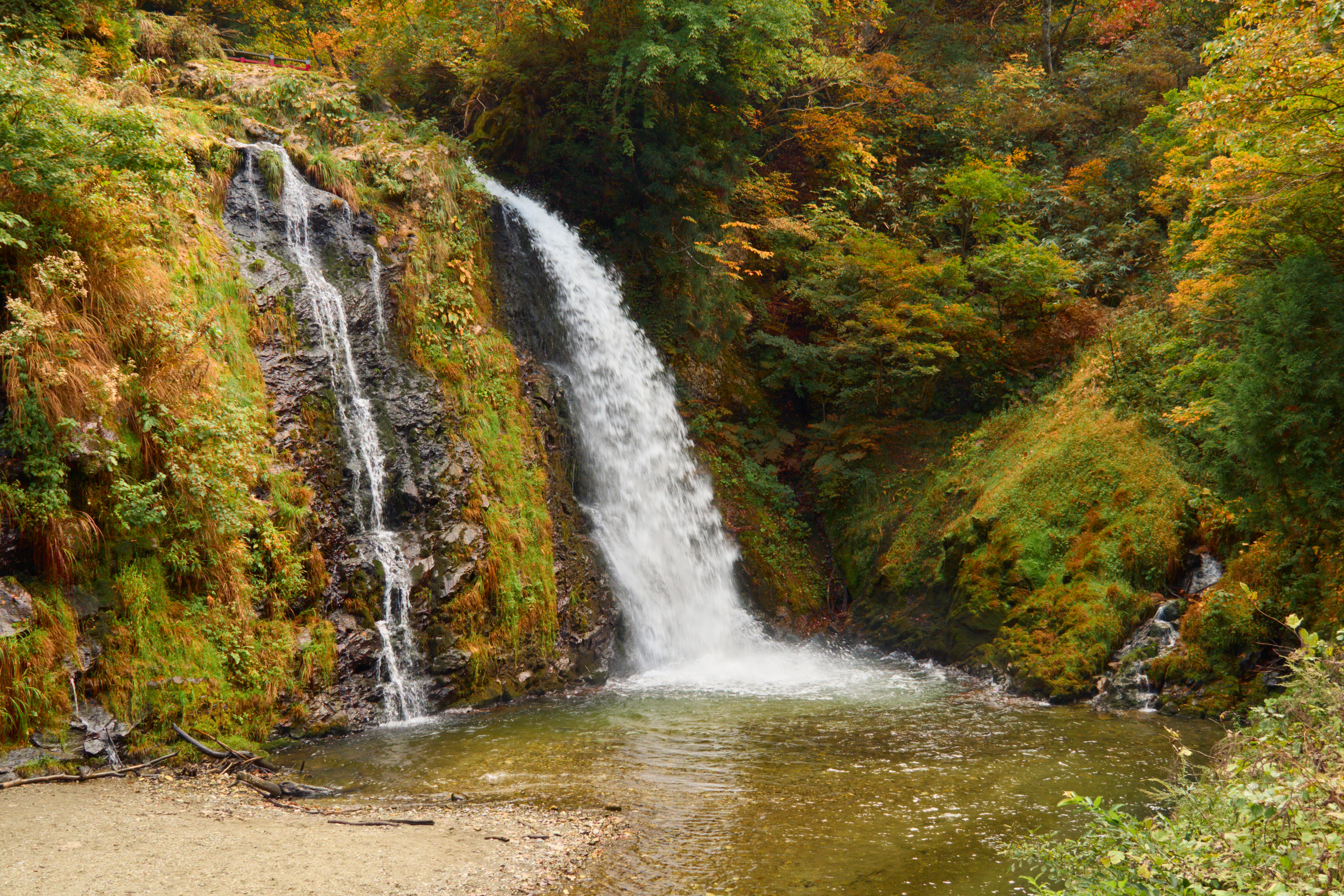
