= Kabusan Prefectural Natural Park =

Natural park of Yamagata prefecture, Japan

Coordinates: 38°59′39″N 140°18′11″E

- 加無山県立自然公園
- Interactive map of Kabusan Prefectural Natural Park
- Location: Yamagata Prefecture, Japan
- Nearest town: Kaneyama, Mamurogawa
- Area: 85.02 km^{2} (32.83 sq mi)
- Established: 6 December 1963

Kabusan Prefectural Natural Park (加無山県立自然公園, Kabusan kenritsu shizen-kōen) is a Prefectural Natural Park in Yamagata Prefecture, Japan. Established in 1963, the park lies within the municipalities of Kaneyama and Mamurogawa. The park's central feature is the eponymous Mount Kabu, which rises to a height of 997 metres (3,271 ft).

== See also ==
- National Parks of Japan
