= Goshōzan Prefectural Natural Park =

Natural park of Yamagata prefecture, Japan

- 御所山県立自然公園
- Location within Yamagata Prefecture Location within Japan
- Location: Yamagata Prefecture, Japan
- Nearest city: Higashine, Mogami, Obanazawa
- Coordinates: 38.5°N 140.55°E
- Area: 135.15 square kilometres (52.18 sq mi)
- Established: 20 March 1951

Goshōzan Prefectural Natural Park (御所山県立自然公園, Goshōzan kenritsu shizen-kōen) is a Prefectural Natural Park in eastern Yamagata Prefecture, Japan. Established in 1951, the park spans the borders of the municipalities of Higashine, Mogami, and Obanazawa. The park's central feature is the eponymous Mount Goshō.

== See also ==
- National Parks of Japan
