= Tendō Kōgen Prefectural Natural Park =

Prefectural Natural Park in Japan

Coordinates: 38°59′39″N 140°18′11″E

- 天童高原県立自然公園
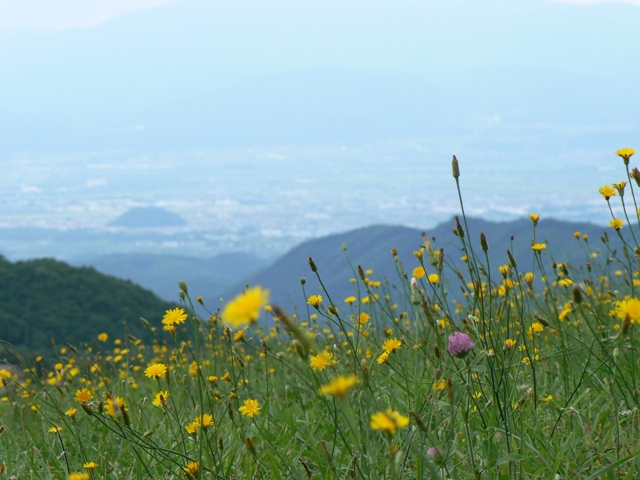

- Location within Japan Location within Yamagata Prefecture
- Location: Yamagata Prefecture, Japan
- Nearest city: Tendō
- Area: 18.83 square kilometres (7.27 sq mi)
- Established: 30 August 1967

Tendō Kōgen Prefectural Natural Park (天童高原県立自然公園, Tendō Kōgen kenritsu shizen-kōen) is a Prefectural Natural Park in Yamagata Prefecture, Japan. Established in 1967, the park lies wholly within the municipality of Tendō. The park's central feature is the eponymous Tendō plateau.

== See also ==
- National Parks of Japan
