= Mogamigawa Prefectural Natural Park =

Natural park of Yamagata prefecture, Japan

- 最上川県立自然公園
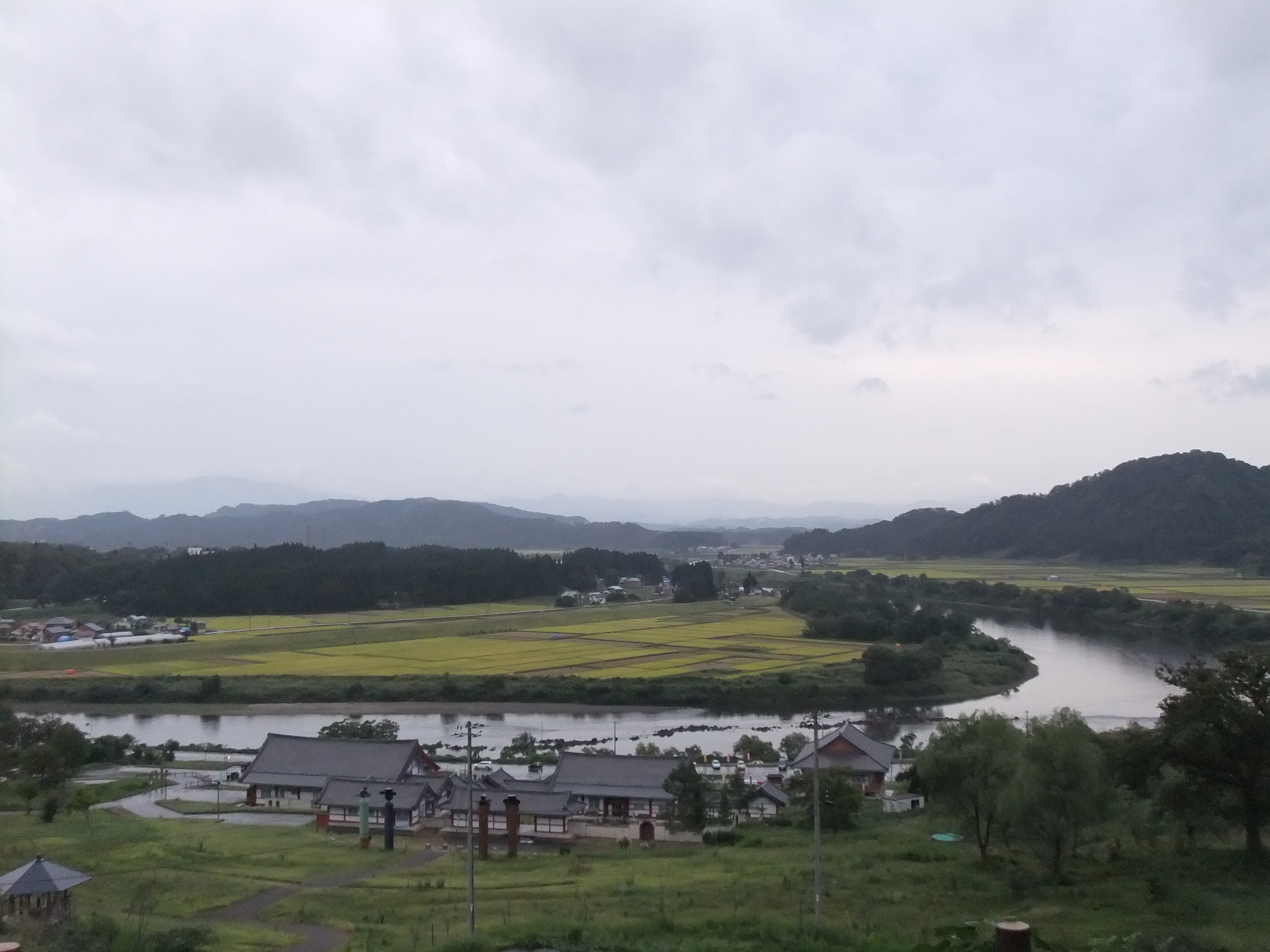
- Interactive map of Mogamigawa Prefectural Natural Park
- Location: Yamagata Prefecture, Japan
- Nearest town: Sakata, Shōnai, Tozawa
- Area: 18.48 square kilometres (7.14 sq mi)
- Established: 2 June 1971

Mogamigawa Prefectural Natural Park (最上川県立自然公園, Mogamigawa kenritsu shizen-kōen) is a Prefectural Natural Park in Yamagata Prefecture, Japan. Established in 1971, the park spans the borders of the municipalities of Sakata, Shōnai, and Tozawa. The park's central feature is the eponymous Mogami River.

== See also ==
- National Parks of Japan
