= Higashimurayama District =

District in Yamagata prefecture, Japan

Coordinates: 38.296°N 140.232°E

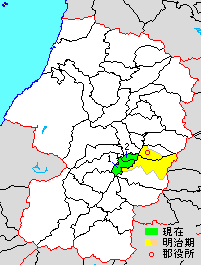
Map showing original extent of Higashimurayama District in Yamagata Prefecture yellow & green area=original extent in Meiji period; green=present area; 1=Yamanobe; 2=Nakayama

Higashimurayama (東村山郡, Higashimurayama-gun) is a rural district located in Yamagata Prefecture, Japan. As of December 2013, the district has an estimated population of 26,429 and an area of 92.59 km^{2}. The portion of the cities of Yamagata and Tendō were formerly part of Higashimurayama District.

== Towns and villages ==
- Nakayama
- Yamanobe

== History ==
Murayama County was an ancient place name in part of Dewa Province, occupying the area of modern Mogami, Nishimurayama, Kitamurayama and Higashimurayama districts. Under the Tokugawa shogunate, the area Higashimurayama district was a complicated mosaic. The Tokugawa shogunate controlled 12 villages as tenryo, with an additional 2 villages as hatamoto territory. Various domains controlled most of the remaining territory: 20 villages were part of Tatebayashi Domain, 19 villages were part of Sakura Domain, 16 villages were part of Tendō Domain, 7 villages were under Yamagata Domain, 7 villages were part of Tsuchiura Domain, 6 villages were part of Tanakura Domain and 12 villages were either shared between domains or were ecclesiastical territory. The area became part of Yamagata Prefecture in 1876. At that time, Higashimurayama District consisted of 1 town and 97 villages.

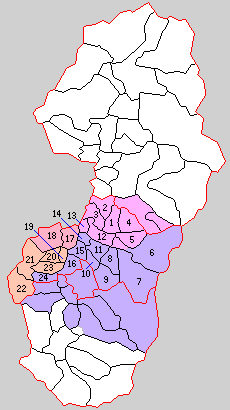
Historic Map of Higashimurayama District: 1. Tendō; 2. Nariu; 3. Kurazō; 4. Tsuyama; 5. Hoshinuno; 6. Yamadera; 7. Takase; 8. Tateyama; 9. Suzukawa; 10. Chitose; 11. Dewa; 12. Takatama; 13. Terazu; 14. Meiji; 15. Ōsato; 16. Kanei; 17. Mogami; 18. Toyoda; 19. Yamanobe; 20. Ōtera; 21. Naka; 22. Sakuyazawa; 23. Sagami; 24. Ōsone; Purple=Yamagata City Orange=Yamanobe Town Red=Nakayama Town Pink=Tendō City

With the establishment of the municipality system on April 1, 1889, the district was consolidated into one town (Tendō) and 23 villages.

- On July 27, 1896 Yamanobe was raised to town status
- On August 26, 1897 Nagasaki was raised to town status
- On October 10, 1954 Nagasaki merged with the village of Toyota to form the town of Nakayama
- On October 1, 1958 Tendō was raised to city status
