= Kazunobu Mineta =

Japanese singer-songwriter and actor (born 1977)

Kazunobu Mineta 峯田和伸
- Born: 10 December 1977 (age 47); Yamanobe, Yamagata, Japan
- Genres: Noise punk
- Occupation: Singer-songwriter
- Instruments: Vocals; guitar; synthesizer
- Years active: 1996–
- Labels: Libra Records; Hatsukoi Moudo Gakuen

Kazunobu Mineta (峯田和伸, Mineta Kazunobu; born 10 December 1977) is a Japanese singer-songwriter and actor. He is the frontman of the punk rock band Ging Nang Boyz (銀杏BOYZ), formed in 2003 after the breakup of his previous band GOING STEADY.

== Biography ==
Born in Yamanobe, Higashimurayama District, Yamagata, Mineta's parents owned and operated the electronics dealership Mineta Denki (峯田電器). He graduated from Tateyama Neighbor Primary School (山辺町立山辺小学校), Tateyama Edge Junior High School (山辺町立山辺中学校), Yamagata Civic Commercial High School (山形市立商業高等学校) (where he belonged to the softball club and was in charge of auditing as part of the student council), and Tokyo University of Information Sciences Faculty of Management Information (composer Akio Izutsu was one of his contemporaries). Mineta formed the punk rock band GOING STEADY in 1996, which included his high school classmate Murai Mamoru (村井守) on drums. The band was signed to Libra Records—part of the larger independent label UK Project—from the release of their first single "You & I" in 1999 until they formed their own label Hatsukoi Moudo Gakuen (初恋妄°C学園) (also a sublabel of UK Project), which released GOING STEADY's fifth single "Wakamonotachi / Yoru Ouji to Tsuki no Hime" (若者たち / 夜王子と月の姫) and all material from GOING STEADY, Ging Nang Boyz and their related projects thereafter. At the peak of their popularity, the band broke up on 15 January 2003, shortly before they were to begin a national tour.

That year, an Elephant Kashimashi tribute album titled Hanaotoko (花男) was released, and it featured a solo a cappella recording by Mineta under the moniker Ging Nang Boyz (銀杏BOYZ). After that, Ging Nang Boyz became his band regime, and Mineta is in charge of vocals and guitar. On 15 January 2005, the band released two albums simultaneously Kimi to Boku no Dai Sanji Sekai Taisen-teki Renai Kakumei and Door.

During his solo career, he starred in the film Iden & Tity as the leading character Nakajima. In 2002 and 2005, he released two books Mayonaka no Futari-goto and Futari-goto co-authored with the Onanie Machine bassist and vocalist Inomar. The DVD version of Futari-goto was also released, and he carries out a wide range of activities as well as music.

In 2005, he got naked during a live performance in the Rock in Japan Festival 2005, and sent out documents.

In 2006, Mineta and guitarist Chin Nakamura, as well as four non-celebrity women recruited from their own blog debut as Binkan Dhōnen-tai. He released the book "Koi to Taikutsu" with his modified blog.

Ging Nang Boyz's documentary DVD Bokutachi wa Sekai o Kaeru koto ga dekinai. was released on 11 April 2007. He later appeared in the role of a pornographic actor in the film version of Gumi. Chocolate. Pine created by Kenji Ohtsuki.

On the night of 28 July 2007, when he appeared in a concert in Taipei, Taiwan, he took off his underwear on stage and showed his lower body and prompting an interrogation by police authorities. According to the Taiwanese newspaper United Daily News the following day, during the demonstration he pulled his pants down to the knees, singing closer to the audience at the stage. The organizer later said that the pants accidentally fell down when crouching, but the police authorities said that they would be offending criminal disturbances of criminal law. When Mineta dropped his underwear, a part of the audience got excited and rushed to the stage (that the venue showed a considerable excitement with the call to Ging Nang Boyz even after their live concert ended). Afterwards, the document was sent to the public on charges of obscene neglect, paid a fine of 9,000 Taiwanese dollars and returned to Japan on the following day (he informed the local people who wanted the story of the article, not the audience nor stakeholder journalists). Since he never returned to Taiwan to face further prosecution, he was given a judgment of "Exempt from Prosecution" by Taipei District Court on 31 July 2020.

He appeared in Monster Bash, an outdoor festival held in Kagawa Prefecture on 25 August 2007. Minneta became naked just before leaving the stage, and band member Shinya Abiko lowered his head and apologized.

On 24 December 2008, a male fan's genitalia was chewed by another male fan and cried at a collaborative project with Inomar of Onanie Machine who appeared at Ging Nang Boyz's Dōtei-tachi no Christmas Eve 2008.

On 20 April 2009, at a preliminary show preview of the film Shikisoku Generation (directed by Tomorowo Taguchi), an interview conducted for a reporter to the performer Asami Usuda with frequent sexual harassment questions such as "free sex faction?" Mineta, who fogged his expression on this, had a curtain to interrogate about twenty minutes and said "how did you hear it?" to the reporter after the interview.

His first starring role in a serial drama was in the Premium Drama Kiseki no Hito of NHK BS Premium in 2016.

== Filmography ==
=== Films ===
Dates	Title	Role	Notes	Ref.
2003	Aiden & Titi	Nakajima	Lead role	
2007	Gumi. Chocolate. Pine	AV Actor		
2008	Shonen Merikensack	Jimmy (Young)		
2009	USB	Kai		
2009	The Shikisoku Generation	Hige Godzilla		
2010	Boys on the Run	Tanishi Toshiyuki	Lead role	
2015	Piece of Cake	Chiba		
2016	My Life as a Courgette	Courgette	Mineta appears on the film's Japanese dub	
2018	Suteki na Dynamite Scandal	Chikamatsu		
2018	Neko wa Daku Mono	Tamotsu Goto		
2019	Ichigo no Uta	Ramen shop owner	Movie based on the novel of the same name co-written by Mineta	
2020	Etsunen: Lovers	Hirokazu	Lead role, Taiwanese-Japanese film	
2025	BAUS: The Ship's Voyage Continues	Hajime		
2026	Street Kingdom	Yuichi	Lead role	

=== Television ===
Dates	Title	Role	Notes	Ref.
2016	Kiseki no Hito	Ichitaku Kameji	Lead role	
2017	Hiyokko	Muneo Koiwai	Asadora	
2018	Takane no Hana	Kazama Naoto	Lead role	
2019	Idaten	Sei-san	Taiga drama	

=== Music videos ===
Year	Artist	Song	Role	Ref.
2003	Onanie Machine	Soshiki	Funeral Attendee	
2016	Yuko Ando	"Hone"	Kosuke Kindaichi	
