= Hibakoiwa Caves =

Jōmon period archaeological site in Takahata, Tōhoku, Japan

- 火箱岩洞窟 (Japanese)
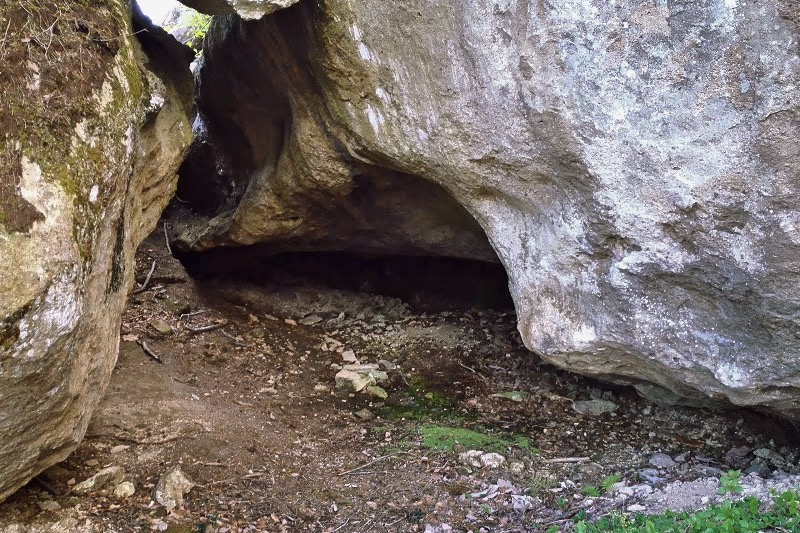
- Hibakoiwa Caves

- Hibakoiwa Caves Hibakoiwa Caves (Japan)
- 38°03′02″N 140°12′56″E
- Type: settlement
- Periods: Jōmon period
- Location: Takahata, Yamagata, Japan
- Region: Tōhoku region

Site notes
- Elevation: 340 m (1,120 ft)
- Excavation dates: 1961-1963
- Discovered: 1960
- Public access: Yes (no facilities)

The Hibakoiwa Caves (火箱岩洞窟, Hibakoiwa dōkutsu) is an archaeological site containing the ruins of a Jōmon period cave dwelling located in what is now part of the town of Takahata, Yamagata in the Tōhoku region of northern Japan. The site was designated a National Historic Site of Japan in 1983.

== Overview ==
The site consists of two natural caves which are located in on a tuff cliff on the southern slope of Mount Daishimori. The caves were discovered in 1960 and excavated from 1961 to 1963. The cave was found to contain stratified cultural layers indicating settlement from the early Jōmon period through the Kofun periods. Numerous examples of Jōmon earthenware in various styles, including ridge line and pressed decoration varieties were found.

The site is one of several similar cave dwelling sites which have been found in the vicinity. It is located approximately 30 minutes by car from Takahata Station on the Yamagata Shinkansen.

== See also ==
- List of Historic Sites of Japan (Yamagata)
- Hinata Caves
- Ōdachi Caves
