= Yoshino =

Yoshino may refer to:

- Yoshino cherry, another name for Prunus × yedoensis, a flowering cherry tree
- Japanese cruiser Yoshino, a protected cruiser of the Imperial Japanese Navy

== Places ==
- Yoshino, Nara, a town located in Yoshino District, Nara Prefecture, Japan
- Yoshino, Nan'yō, Yamagata, a small town in the north of Nanyo, Yamagata Prefecture, Japan
- Yoshino, Tokushima, a former town located in Itano District, Tokushima, Japan
- Yoshino District, Nara, a district located in Nara Prefecture, Japan
- Yoshino-Kumano National Park, a Japanese national park comprising areas of Mie, Nara, and Wakayama Prefectures
- Yoshino Mikumari Shrine, a Shinto shrine located on Mount Yoshino
- Yoshino Mountain, a mountain located in the town of Yoshino in Nara Prefecture
- Yoshino Province, an old province of Japan
- Yoshino River, a river on the island of Shikoku, Japan
- Yoshino Shrine, a Shinto shrine in Yoshino District, Nara Prefecture, Japan

== People ==
=== Surname ===
- Akira Yoshino (吉野 彰; born 1948), Japanese chemist
- Hideo Yoshino (吉野 秀雄; 1902–1967), tanka poet in Shōwa period Japan
- Hiroshi Yoshino (吉野 弘; 1926–2014), Japanese poet
- Hiroyuki Yoshino (voice actor) (吉野 裕行; born 1974), Japanese voice actor affiliated with Sigma Seven
- Hiroyuki Yoshino (screenwriter) (吉野 弘幸; born 1970), Japanese screenwriter
- Hiroyuki Yoshino, former national Japanese champion and early member of the All Japan Kickboxing Federation
- Hokuto Yoshino (吉野 北人; born 1997), Japanese singer, performer and actor
- Kazuki Yoshino (吉野 一基; born 1985), Japanese former footballer
- Keiichirō Yoshino (吉野 銈一郎; 1895–1983), Japanese photographer
- Kenji Yoshino (born 1969), American legal scholar and essayist
- Kimi Yoshino, American journalist
- Kimika Yoshino (吉野 公佳; born 1975), Japanese actress and gravure idol
- Kyohei Yoshino (吉野 恭平; born 1994), Japanese football player
- Makoto Yoshino (吉野 誠; born 1977), Japanese professional baseball pitcher
- Masato Yoshino (吉野 正人; born 1980), Japanese professional wrestler
- Masatoshi Yoshino (吉野 正敏; 1928–2017), Japanese physical geographer and climatologist
- Masayoshi Yoshino (吉野 正芳; born 1948), Japanese politician and member of the House of Representatives in the Diet
- Mickie Yoshino (ミッキー 吉野; born 1951), Japanese keyboard player
- Nobuatsu Yoshino (吉野 伸篤; born 1940), Japanese sprint canoer
- Noriichi Yoshino (芳野 法一; born 1943), Japanese rower
- Sakuzō Yoshino (吉野 作造; 1878–1933), Japanese historian, writer and professor of political science
- Sally Yoshino (born 1978), Japanese striptease dancer, model, and former AV idol
- Sayaka Yoshino (吉野 紗香; born 1982), Japanese actress, model, and television personality
- Shinji Yoshino (吉野 信次; 1888–1971), government member in the Empire of Japan and in post-war Japan
- Shuichiro Yoshino (吉野 修一郎; born 1991), Japanese professional boxer
- Shuta Yoshino (吉野 洲太; born 1943), Japanese boxer
- Takamitsu Yoshino (吉野 峻光; born 1989), Japanese football player
- Tatsuhiko Yoshino (吉野 達彦; born 1985), Japanese professional wrestler
- Tatsuro Yoshino (吉野 達郎; born 1982), Japanese sprinter
- Tomoko Yoshino (芳野 友子; born 1966), Japanese first female president of RENGO
- Tomoyuki Yoshino (吉野 智行; born 1980), Japanese former football player
- Toshiro Yoshino (吉野 俊郎; born 1960), Japanese rugby union player
- Toyoko Yoshino (吉野 トヨ子; 1920–2015), Japanese discus thrower
- Yuji Yoshino (吉野 裕司), Japanese composer of video-game music
- Yumi Yoshino (芳野 友美; born 1980), Japanese actress

=== Given name ===
- Yoshino Aoki (青木 佳乃) (born 1971), Japanese video game composer
- Yoshino Aoyama (青山吉能; born 1996), Japanese voice actress
- Yoshino Enomoto (永野元 佳乃; born 1998), Japanese ice hockey player
- Yoshino Kimura (木村 佳乃) (born 1976), Japanese actress
- Yoshino Mabuchi (born 1966), a retired Japanese diver who won bronze medals at the 1982 Asian Games
- Yoshino Nakashima (中嶋 淑乃) (born 1999), Japanese professional footballer
- Yoshino Nanjō (南條 愛乃) (born 1984), Japanese voice actress
- Yoshino Nishide (born 1955), Japanese diver
- Yoshino Ohtori (鳳 芳野) (born 1947), Japanese voice actress
- Yoshino Ōishi (大石 芳野) (born 1944), Japanese photojournalist
- Yoshino Takamori (鷹森 淑乃) (born 1963), Japanese voice actress

=== Fictional characters ===
- Sakura Yoshino, a character from the Da capo visual novel
- Yoshino Somei, a character from the manga Spriggan
- Yusuke Yoshino, a character from the anime/manga/visual novel Clannad
- Yoshino, a character in Bleach (manga)
- Yoshino Naganohara, a character from the anime and manga series Nichijou
- Yoshino Takatsuki, a character in the Wandering Son manga
- Yoshino Nara, a character in the anime/manga Naruto
- Yoshino Fujieda, a character in the anime Digimon Savers
- Yoshino Yorita, a character in The Idolmaster Cinderella Girls series
- Yoshino Takigawa, a male character in the anime/manga Blast of Tempest
- Yoshino Himekawa, a character in the Date A Live series

=== Other ===
- Yoshino (restaurant), a Michelin-starred sushi restaurant in New York City
