= Ichinosawa Caves =

Jōmon period archaeological site in Takahata, Tōhoku, Japan

- 一の沢洞窟 (Japanese)
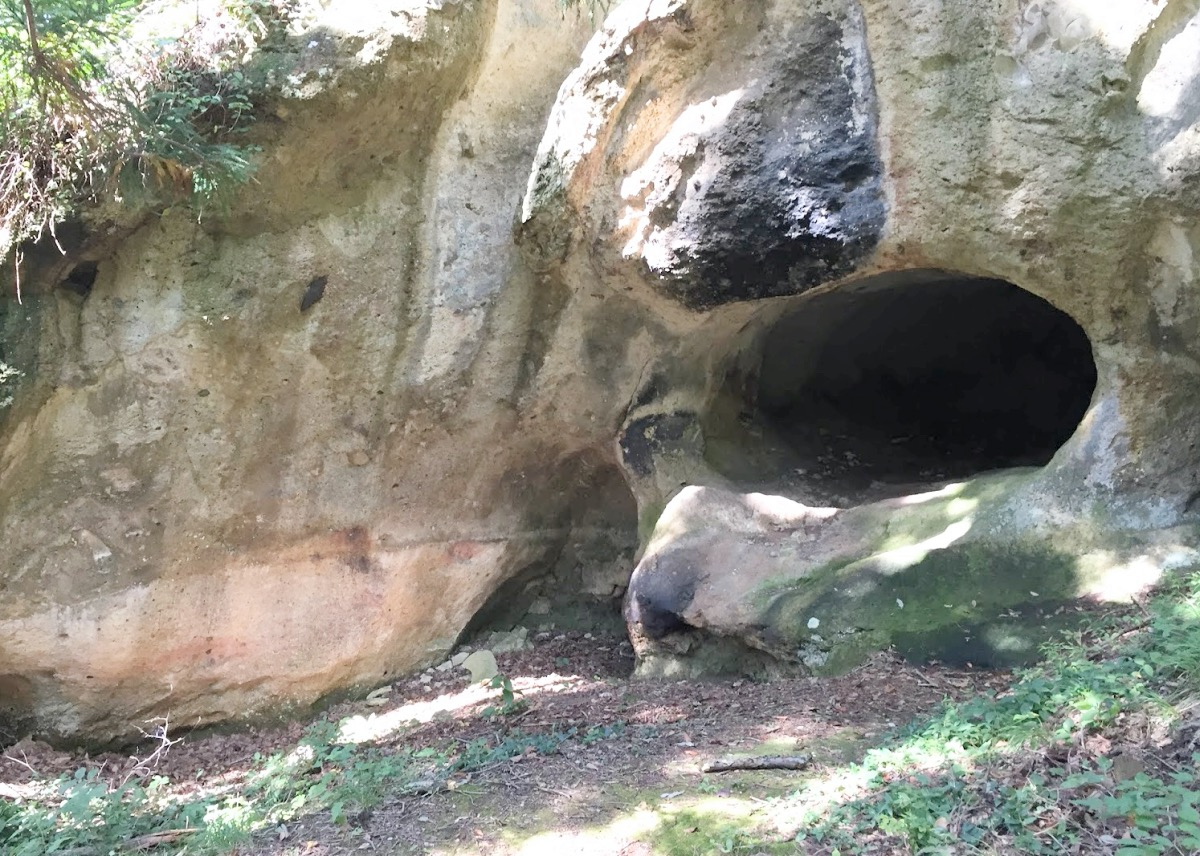
- Ichinosawa Caves

- Ichinosawa Caves Ichinosawa Caves (Japan)
- 38°02′50″N 140°13′51″E
- Type: settlement
- Periods: Jōmon period
- Location: Takahata, Yamagata, Japan
- Region: Tōhoku region

Site notes
- Excavation dates: 1960
- Discovered: 1958
- Public access: Yes (no facilities)

The Ichinosawa Caves (一の沢洞窟, Ichinosawa dōkutsu) is an archaeological site containing the ruins of a Jōmon period cave dwelling located in what is now the northern part of the town of Takahata, Yamagata in the Tōhoku region of Japan. The site was designated a National Historic Site of Japan in 1980.

== Overview ==
The site consists of three caves which are located in on a tuff cliff near the headwaters of the Ichinosawa River, a tributary of the Yashiro River that flows into Yonezawa Basin, at an elevation of approximately 40 meters above the valley floor. The caves were discovered in 1958 and excavated in 1960. Cave 1 extends 40 meters into the hill, and was found to contain a stratified cultural layer two meters in thickness. The uppermost layer contained shards of Haji ware pottery and iron fragments from the Yayoi period, the second layer had pottery and stone tools from the early Jōmon period (4000–2500 BCE) . The third layer had the most abundant artifacts, with a large amount of Jōmon earthenware and stone tools dating from the Incipient Jōmon (14,000–7500 BCE).

The site is one of several similar cave dwelling sites which have been found in the vicinity. It is located approximately 30 minutes by car from Takahata Station on the Yamagata Shinkansen.

== See also ==
- List of Historic Sites of Japan (Yamagata)
- Hinata Caves
- Ōdachi Caves
