= Takeko =

- Gender: Female

Origin
- Origin: Japanese
- Meaning: Different meanings depending on the kanji used

Takeko (written: 武子 or 竹子) is a feminine Japanese given name. Notable people with the name include:

- Takeko Kujō (九条 武子; 1887–1928), Japanese poet
- Nakano Takeko (中野 竹子; 1847–1868), Japanese soldier
