= Keiichirō =

- Gender: Male

Origin
- Origin: Japanese
- Meaning: Different meanings depending on the kanji used

Keiichirō, Keiichiro or Keiichirou (written: 敬一郎, 銈一郎, 圭一郎, 桂一郎, 啓一郎, 恵一郎 or 慶一郎) is a masculine Japanese given name. Notable people with the name include:

- Keiichirō Akagi (赤木 圭一郎; 1939–1961), Japanese actor
- Keiichiro Asao (浅尾 慶一郎; born 1964), Japanese politician
- Keiichiro Fukabori (深堀 圭一郎; born 1968), Japanese golfer
- Keiichirō Gotō (後藤 敬一郎; 1918–2004), Japanese photographer
- Keiichiro Hirano (平野 啓一郎; born 1975), Japanese writer
- Keiichiro Kobayashi (小林 慶一郎; born 1966), Japanese economist, professor
- Keiichiro Koyama (小山 慶一郎; born 1984), Japanese musician
- Kume Keiichiro (久米 桂一郎; 1866–1934), Japanese painter
- Keiichiro Matsui (松居 圭一郎; born 1994), Japanese badminton player
- Keiichiro Nagashima (長島 圭一郎; born 1982), Japanese speed skater
- Keiichiro Nakano (野 圭一郎; born 1976), Japanese footballer
- Keiichiro Toyama (外山 圭一郎), Japanese video game designer
- Keiichiro Yamamiya (山宮 恵一郎; born 1972), Japanese mixed martial artist
- Keiichirō Yoshino (吉野 銈一郎; 1895–1983), Japanese photographer
