= Yoshino, Nan'yō, Yamagata =

Coordinates: 38.28052°N 140.35530°E

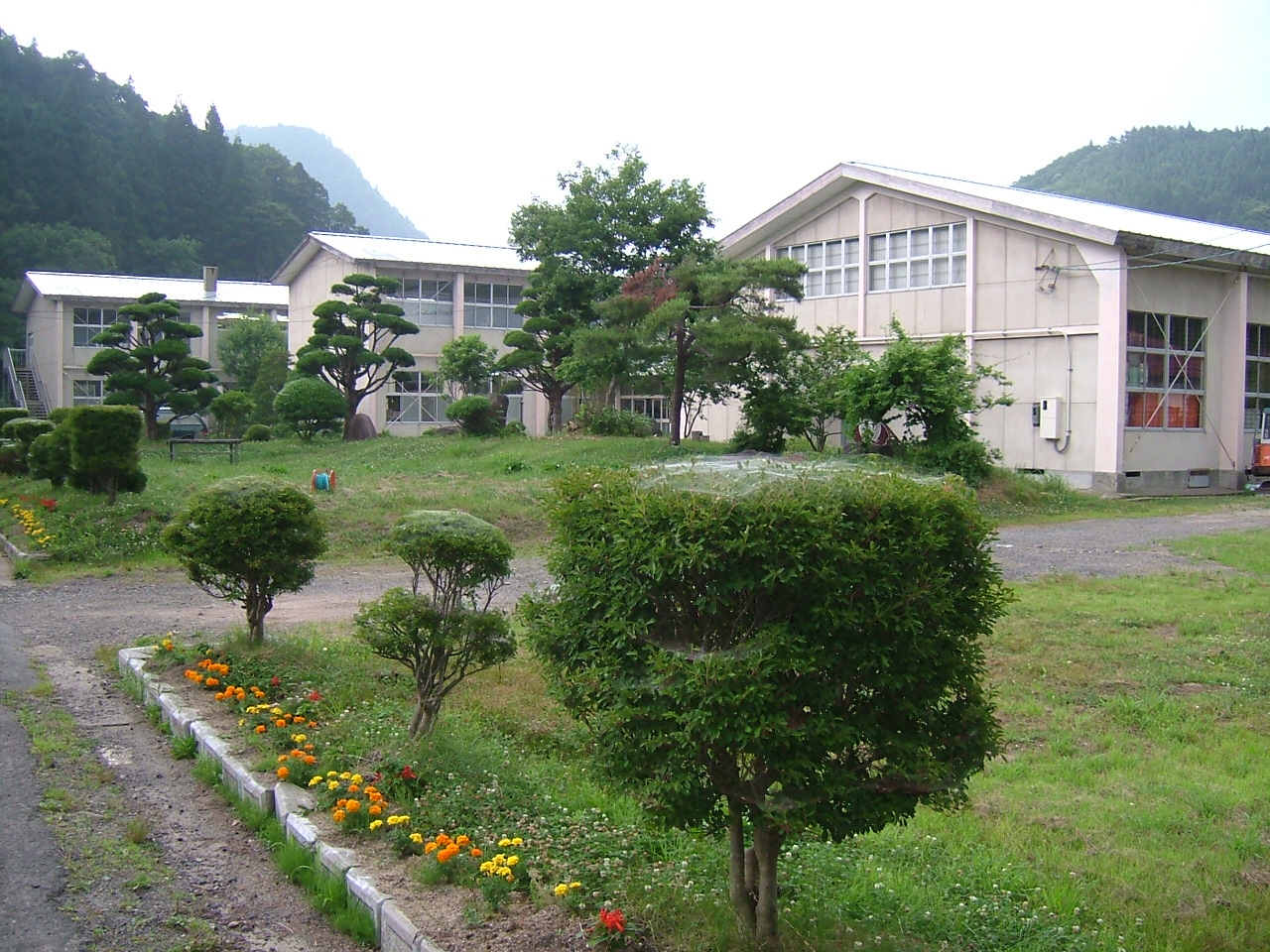
The former Yoshino Junior High School in Nanyo

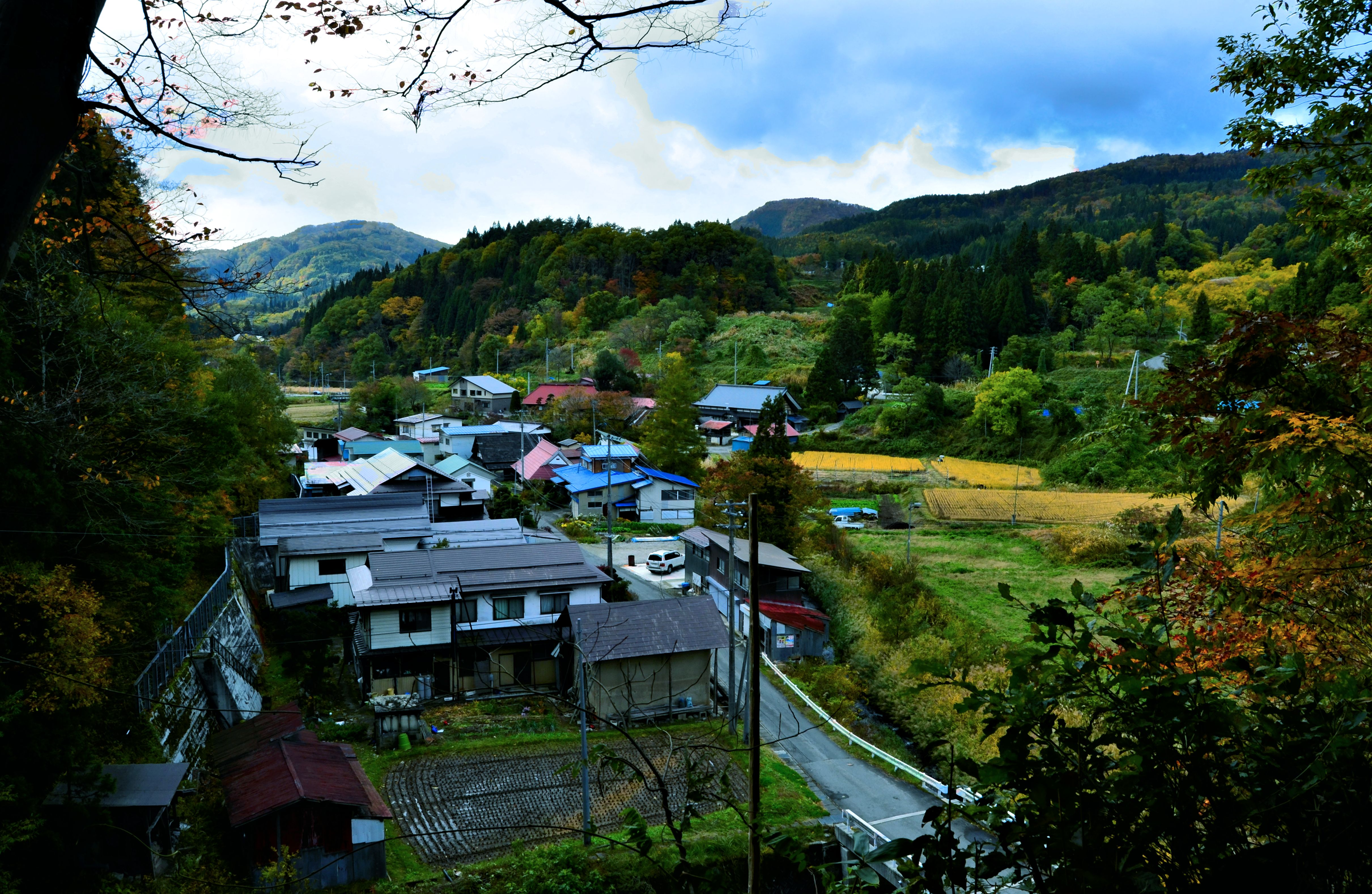
One of the small clusters of houses and shops that makes up the district of Yoshino, in the mountains north of Miyauchi

Yoshino (吉野) is a district in the north of the city of Nan'yō, Yamagata, Japan. It is made up of two smaller sub-districts, Ogi and Kotaki.

As of 2005, the town has a population of 935.

Yoshino is an exemplar of rural depopulation in Japan. Fifty years ago, many people were employed in mining and forestry, the population was over 3,600, and the town even had a cinema. However, forestry gradually died out, and in 1974, the mine closed.

The population decreased further in the late 1990s when a major road, National Route 5, was built through Yoshino. A number of houses had to be demolished, and many affected families chose to relocate to nearby towns with more amenities such as Akayu or Miyauchi.

However, the remaining community is close-knit, and in an effort to retain community spirits they have restarted the annual Kumano Shrine festival, and have organised a number of community sports and culture related societies. Ogi and Kotaki both have small elementary schools, but the single junior high school in Ogi closed in March 2009. The small elementary school in Kotaki was closed in March 2013 and was merged with the elementary school in Ogi.

Kotaki is the site of the Kuguri-taki waterfall (潜り滝).
