= Akayu =

Akayu may refer to:

- Akayu, Yamagata, a town located in Higashiokitama District, Yamagata Prefecture, Japan
- 24965 Akayu, an asteroid
- Akayu Station
