= Heihachirō =

- Gender: Male

Origin
- Origin: Japanese
- Meaning: Different meanings depending on the kanji used

Heihachirō (written: 平八郎) is a masculine Japanese given name. Notable people with the name include:

- Heihachirō Kojima (小島 平八郎; 1895–1973), Japanese photographer
- Tōgō Heihachirō (東郷 平八郎; 1848–1934), Imperial Japanese Navy admiral
- Ōshio Heihachirō (大塩 平八郎; 1793–1837), Japanese samurai
- Honda Heihachirō (本多 平八郎; 1548–1610), Japanese samurai
