= Okigō, Nan'yō, Yamagata =

Okigō (沖郷) is a district in Nan'yō City, Yamagata, Japan. Okigō has one elementary school and one junior high school.
