= Kumano Shrine (Yamagata) =

Shinto shrine in Japan

Kumano Shrine (熊野神社, Kumano-jinja)
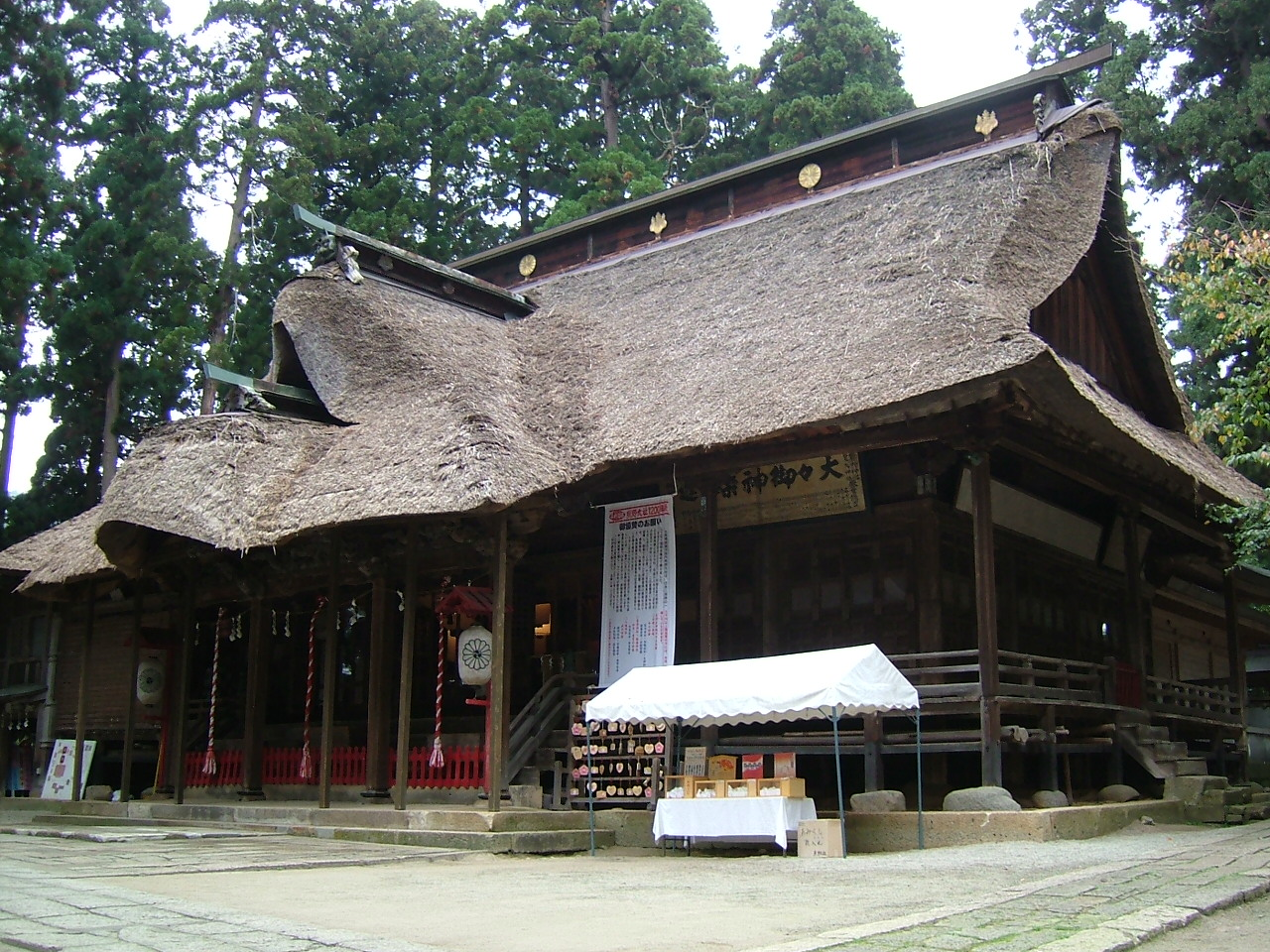
- Kumano Shrine

- Location within Yamagata Prefecture Location within Japan

Religion
- Affiliation: Shinto
- Festival: July 25
- Type: Kumano shrine

Location
- Location: Nan'yō, Yamagata, Japan
- Interactive map of Kumano Shrine (熊野神社, Kumano-jinja)
- Coordinates: 38°04′41″N 140°08′13″E

Architecture
- Established: c.806 AD

Website
- Official website

Kumano Shrine (熊野神社, Kumano-jinja) is a historic Shinto shrine in the Miyauchi neighborhood of the city of Nan'yō, Yamagata, in the Tohoku region of northern Japan. It is commonly referred to as the "Kumano Taisha", although the shrine does not officially have a "Taisha" designation. The shrine is one of the three main centers of the Kumano cult within Shinto.

== History ==
The origins of the shrine are uncertain. The shrine claims to have been founded in 806 AD by Emperor Heizei as a branch of the famous Kumano Sanzan shrines in Kii Province, and the shrine was associated with the provincial temple of Dewa Province. However, an alternative history states that the shrine was built in the late Heian period by Taira no Koremori by order of Emperor Go-Shirakawa. In either case, the shrine was patronized by the successive feudal lords of the region, including the Date clan, Mogami clan and Uesugi clan. After the Meiji restoration and the creation of State Shinto, the shrine was ranked as a Prefectural Shrine.

Two main features of the shrine are a giant tree which locals believe to be several hundred years old, and a traditional tsurigane (釣り鐘) bell. The bell is unique because during World War II, most large iron bells in Japan were melted down for their material. The bell at the shrine was saved by order of the Emperor, and is thus one of the few original preserved bells in Japan.

The Kumano-Taisha festival is held at the shrine each year on July 25.
