= Nan'yō, Yamagata =

Nan'yo 南陽市
- City
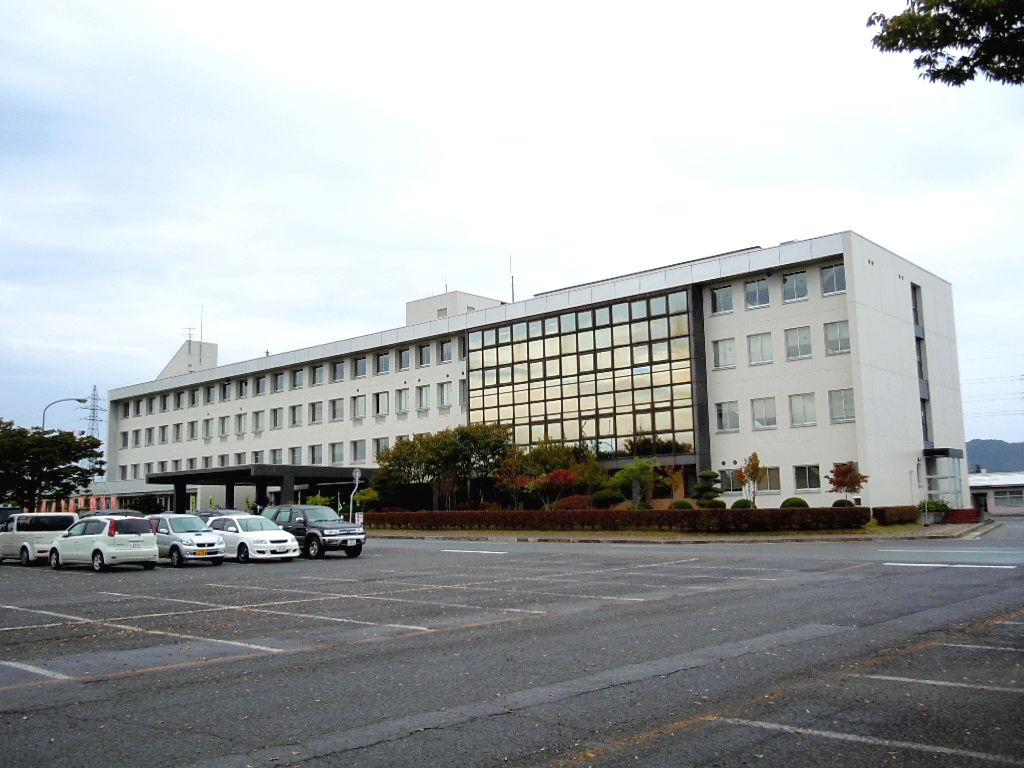
- Nan'yo City Hall

- Flag Seal

- Location of Nan'yo in Yamagata Prefecture

- Location within Japan
- Coordinates: 38°3′18.4″N 140°8′51.4″E
- Country: Japan
- Region: Tōhoku
- Prefecture: Yamagata
- First official recorded: late 4th century (official confirmed)
- Akayu town settled: December 12, 1896
- Three municipality merger and city settled: April 1, 1967

Government
  - Mayor: Masato Shibata (柴田正人) - from July 2026

Area
  - Total: 160.52 km^{2} (61.98 sq mi)

Population (March 2020)
  - Total: 31,112
  - Density: 193.82/km^{2} (501.99/sq mi)
- Time zone: UTC+9 (Japan Standard Time)
- Tree: Sakura
- Flower: Chrysanthemum
- Phone number: 0238-40-3211
- Address: 436-1 Mitsumadori, Nanyō-shi, Yamagata-ken 999-2292
- Website: Official website

Nan'yō (南陽市, Nan'yō-shi) is a city located in Yamagata Prefecture, Japan. As of 1 March 2020, the city had an estimated population of 31,112 in 11379 households, and a population density of 190 persons per km^{2}. The total area of the city is 160.52 square kilometres (62 sq mi).

== Geography ==
Nan'yo is located in the northern part of Okitama Basin in southern Yamagata Prefecture, with mountains to the north, east and west and the Mogami River forming its southern border. It is approximately 21 km from Yonezawa, 35 km from Yamagata city, 61 km from Fukushima, and 95 km from Sendai. The city has an altitude of about 200 meters in the plains rising to 450 meters in the northern mountains. Mt. Shirataka (elevation 994 meters) is the highest elevation in the city.

=== Neighboring municipalities ===
- Yamagata Prefecture
  - Kaminoyama
  - Kawanishi
  - Nagai
  - Shirataka
  - Takahata
  - Yamagata
  - Yamanobe

=== Climate ===
Nan'yō has a humid continental climate (Köppen climate classification Cfa) with large seasonal temperature differences, with warm to hot (and often humid) summers and cold (sometimes severely cold) winters. Precipitation is significant throughout the year, but is heaviest from August to October. The average annual temperature in Nan'yō is 11.3 °C. The average annual rainfall is 1486 mm with September as the wettest month. The temperatures are highest on average in August, at around 25.0 °C, and lowest in January, at around -1.4 °C.

== Demographics ==
Per Japanese census data, the population of Nan'yō has declined slightly over the past 30 years.

Historical population
Year	Pop.	±%
1960	41,324	—
1970	37,271	−9.8%
1980	36,682	−1.6%
1990	36,977	+0.8%
2000	36,191	−2.1%
2010	33,664	−7.0%
2020	31,112	−7.6%

== History ==
The area of present-day Nan'yo was part of ancient Dewa Province. In Japanese folklore it is the setting of the Tsuru no Ongaeshi legend. After the start of the Meiji period, the area was organized into villages within Higashiokitama District, Yamagata Prefecture with the establishment of the modern municipalities system, including the village of Akayu. Akayu was raised to town status in December 1895.

The city of Nan'yo was established on April 1, 1967, by the merger of the former towns of Miyauchi and Akayu with the village of Wagō. Akayu is famous for its hot springs, cherries and hang gliding and includes the former village of Nakagawa. Miyauchi is famous for its chrysanthemum festival and the Kumano-taisha Shrine, and includes the former villages of Urushiyama, Yoshino, and Kaneyama. The village of Wago was created in 1955 by the merger of the villages of Okigō and Ringō. The English travel-writer Isabella Bird visited Akayu in 1878 and wrote about the town in Unbeaten Tracks in Japan. The city is named after Nanyang, China, where according to legend a chrysanthemum spring can make drinkers immortal.

== Government ==
Nan'yō has a mayor-council form of government with a directly elected mayor and a unicameral city legislature of 17 members. The city contributes one member to the Yamagata Prefectural Assembly. In terms of national politics, the city is part of Yamagata District 2 of the lower house of the Diet of Japan.

== Economy ==
The economy of Nan'yo is based on agriculture, light manufacturing, and tourism. A number of wineries are also located in the city.

=== Wine ===
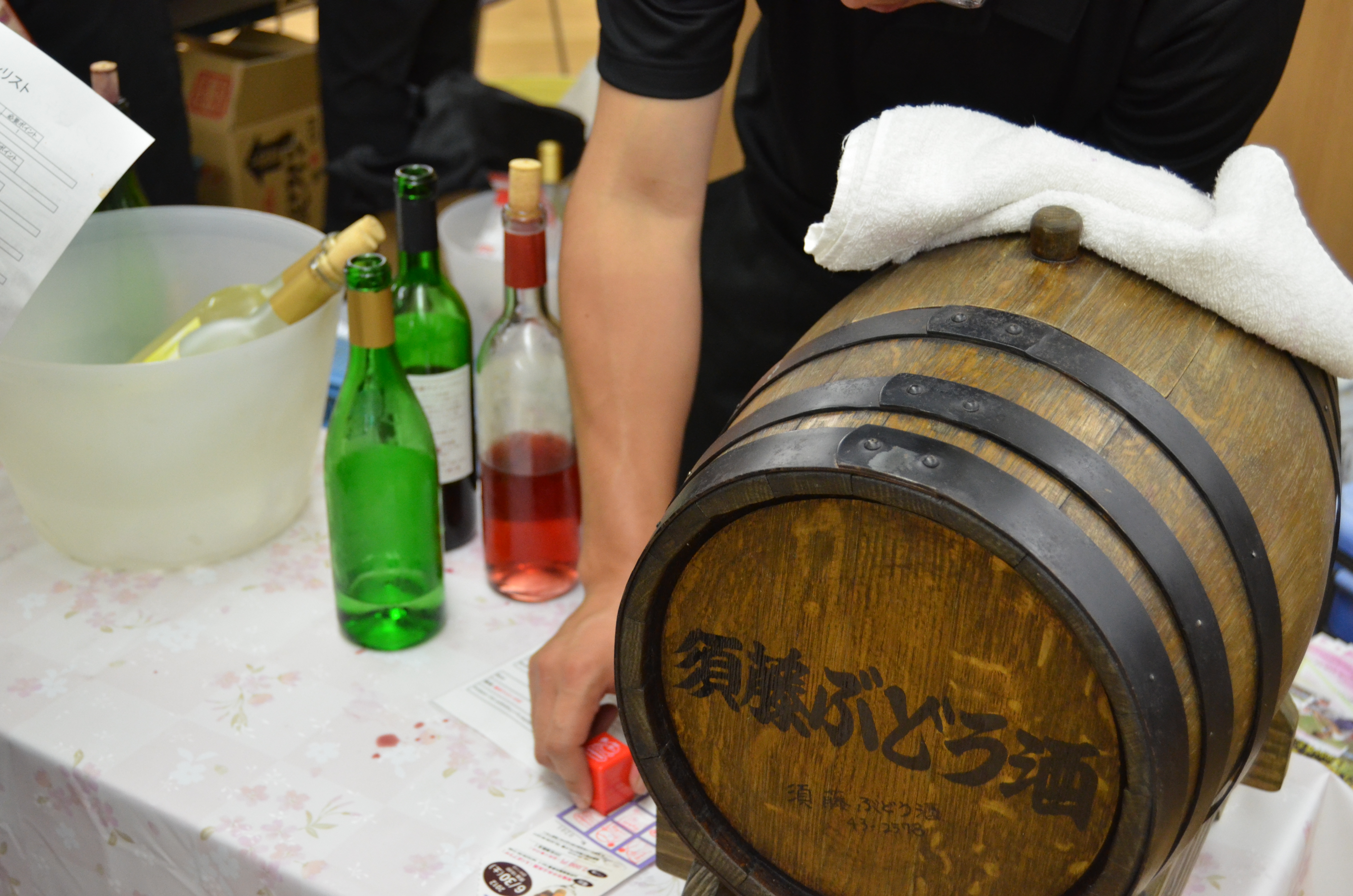
A cask of wine from the Sato Winery in Nan'yō during the annual wine festival

Nan'yō is home to the following three major wineries.

- Sakai Winery
- Oura Winery
- Sato Winery

In addition to the three wineries, Nan'yō is also home to a sake brewery called Azuma no Fumoto (東の麓).

== Education ==
Nan'yō has six public elementary schools and three public middle schools operated by the city government and one public high school operated by the Yamagata Prefectural Board of Education.

=== High schools ===
- Nan'yō High School

=== Junior high schools ===
- Akayu Junior High School
- Miyauchi Junior High School
- Okigō Junior High School

=== Elementary schools ===
- Akayu Elementary School
- Miyauchi Elementary School
- Nakagawa Elementary School
- Okigō Elementary School
- Ringō Elementary School
- Urushiyama Elementary School

== Transportation ==
=== Railway ===
East Japan Railway Company -Yamagata Shinkansen

- Akayu

East Japan Railway Company - Ōu Main Line

- Akayu, Nakagawa

Yamagata Railway Company - Flower Nagai Line

- Akayu, Nanyō-Shiyakusho, Miyauchi, Orihata, Ringō

=== Highways ===
- Tōhoku-Chūō Expressway
- National Route 13
- National Route 113
- National Route 348
- National Route 399

== Media ==
=== Newspapers ===
- Okitama Times

== Local attractions ==
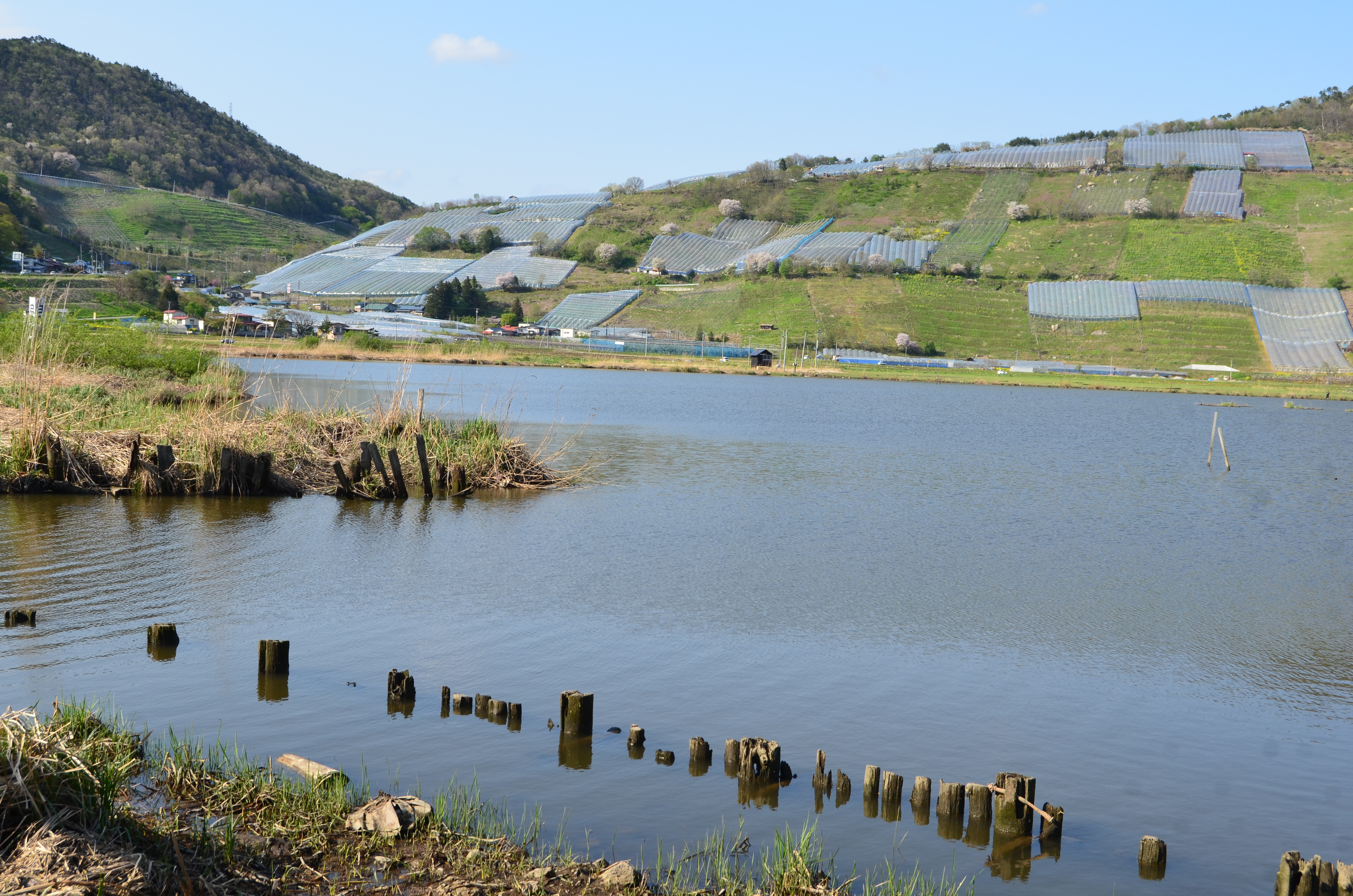
Lake Hakuryuu, with a vineyard on the mountain in the background

- The 33 Images of Buddha, Mt Iwabu, Nakagawa
- Akayu Onsen, Akayu
- Chinzo-ji Temple, Urushiyama
- Hygeia Park onsen complex, Miyauchi
- Inarimori Kofun, Akayu
- Kuguri waterfall, Kotaki
- Kumano Shrine, Miyauchi
- Lake Hakuryuu, Akayu
- Mount Eboshi, Akayu. Listed as one of the 100 cherry blossoms sights in Japan.
- Nan'yo Skypark, Akayu
- Toyotarō Yūki Memorial Museum, Akayu
- Yuzuru no Sato Museum, Urushiyama

== Local events ==
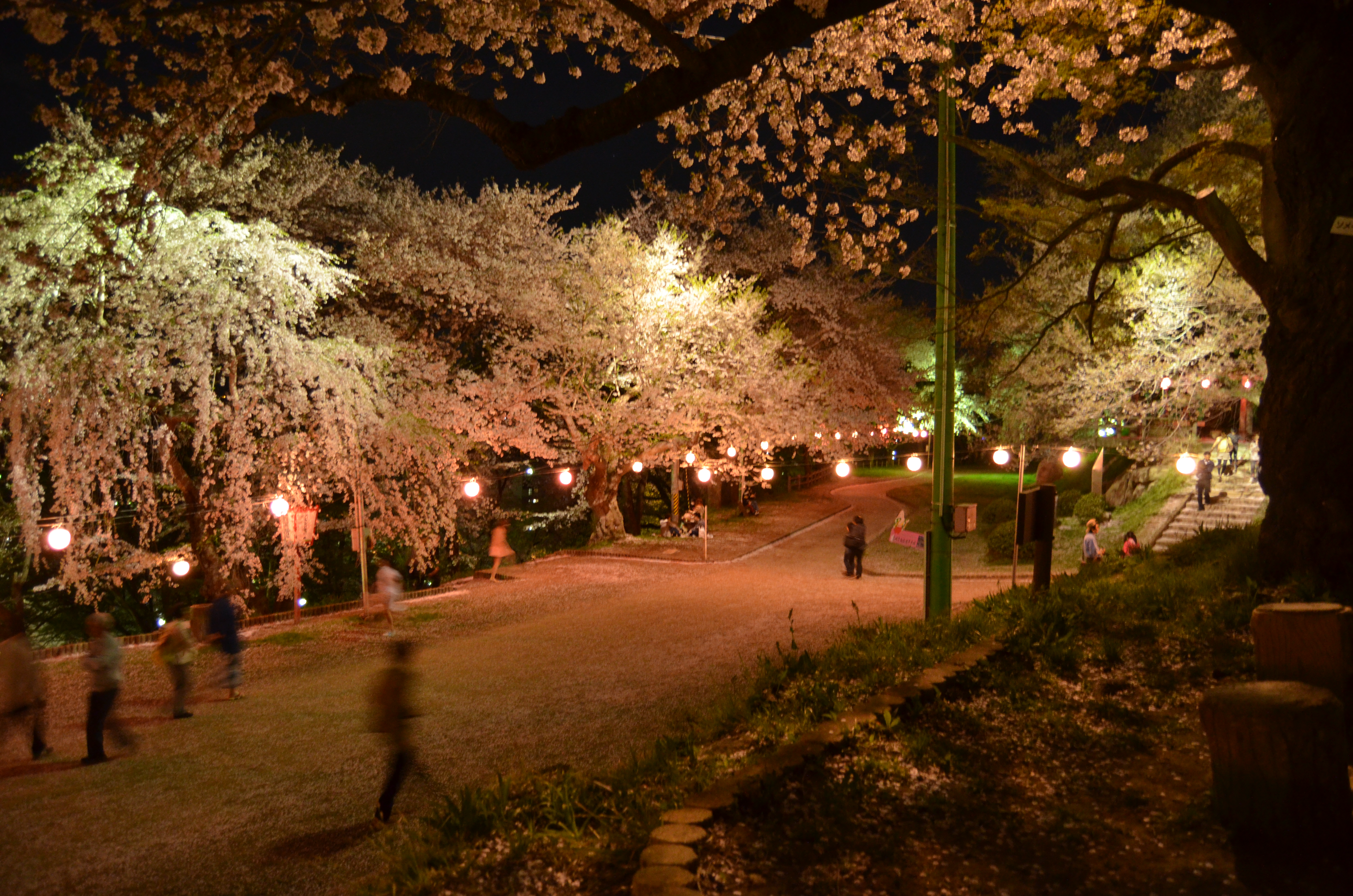
Eboshiyama, one of the 100 best places to see the cherry blossoms in Japan

- Eboshiyama park cherry blossom festival, Akayu, late April to early May
- Sosho park rose festival, Miyauchi, June
- Kumano-taisha festival, Miyauchi, 24–25 July
- Grape picking, sightseeing vineyard, Akayu, August–October
- Nan'yō wine festival, Hygeia park, Miyauchi, August
- Akayu onsen furosato festival, Akayu, second weekend of September
- Chrysanthemum doll festival, Miyauchi, mid-October to mid-November

== Sister cities ==
- Nanyang, Henan, China, since October 6, 1988

== Notable people from Nan'yo ==
- Megumi Ikeda, fencer
- Kyoko Inoue, professional wrestler
- Toyotarō Yūki, banker, politician
