= Ringō, Nan'yō, Yamagata =

Coordinates: 38°03′N 140°05′E

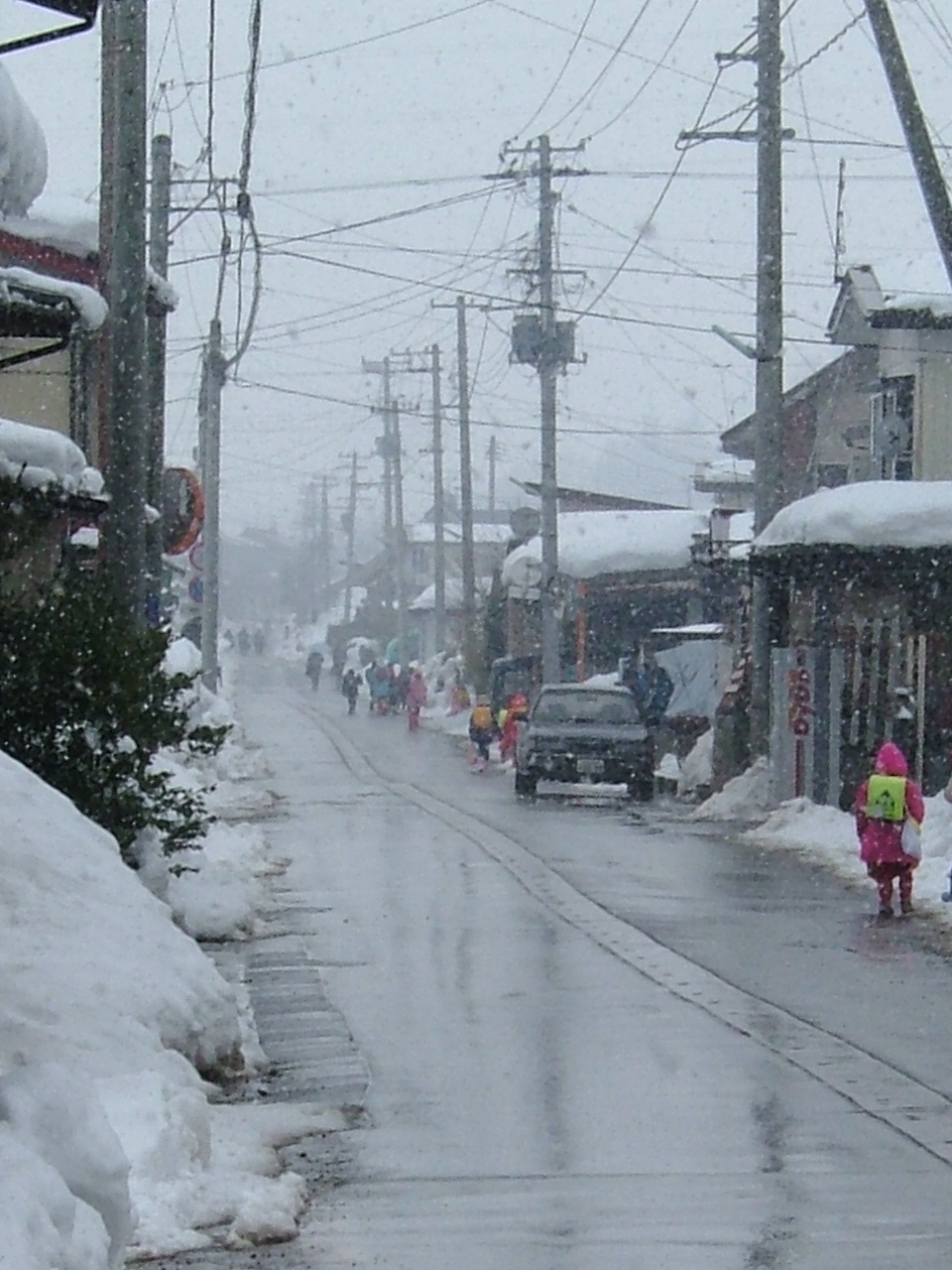
Students walking home from Ringo Elementary School in the winter

Ringō (梨郷) is a district in the western part of the city of Nan'yō, Yamagata, Japan. As of 2003, it has an estimated population of 2,005.

== Education ==
The town has an elementary school, a shrine and several standing stone memorials. A former junior high school was closed in 2008 and merged with Okigo Junior High School.

== Transport ==
Ringō lies on National Route 113, and is served by Ringo Station on the Flower Nagai Line.

== Relations ==
After both towns were affected by the 2011 Tōhoku earthquake and tsunami, Ringō formed a partnership with the Urato Islands administered within the city of Shiogama, located around 90km away.
