= Takahata, Yamagata =

Takahata 高畠町
- Town
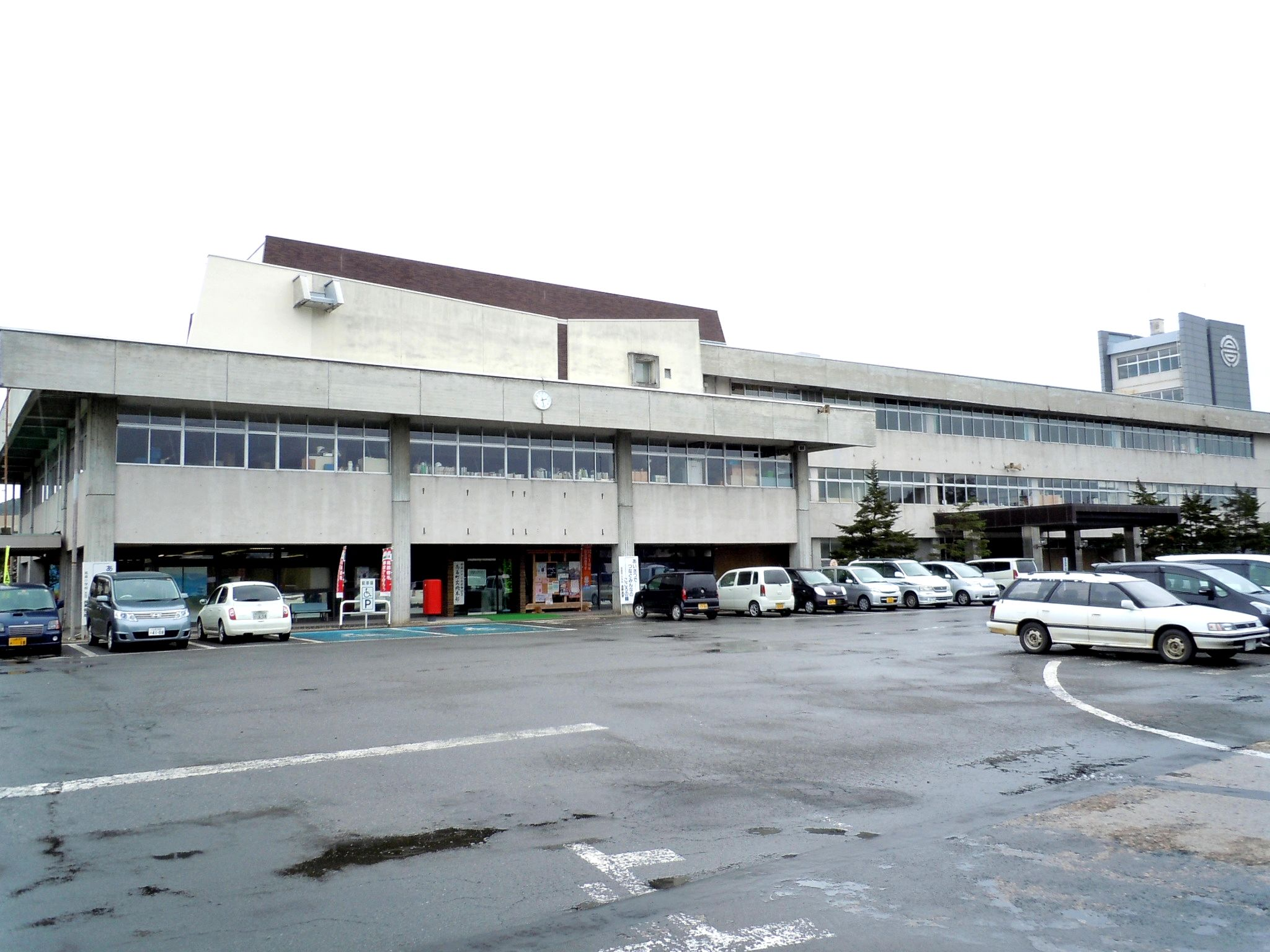
- Takahata Town Hall

- Flag Seal

- Location of Takahata in Yamagata Prefecture

- Coordinates: 38°00′9.9″N 140°11′20.7″E
- Country: Japan
- Region: Tōhoku
- Prefecture: Yamagata
- District: Higashiokitama

Area
  - Total: 180.26 km^{2} (69.60 sq mi)

Population (April 2019)
  - Total: 23,367
  - Density: 129.63/km^{2} (335.74/sq mi)
- Time zone: UTC+9 (Japan Standard Time)
- Phone number: 0238-52-1111
- Address: 436-banchi Takahata, Takahata-machi, Higashiokitama-gun, Yamagata-ken 992-0392
- Climate: Cfa/Dfa
- Website: Official website
- Symbols
- Flower: Azalea
- Tree: Japanese Red Pine

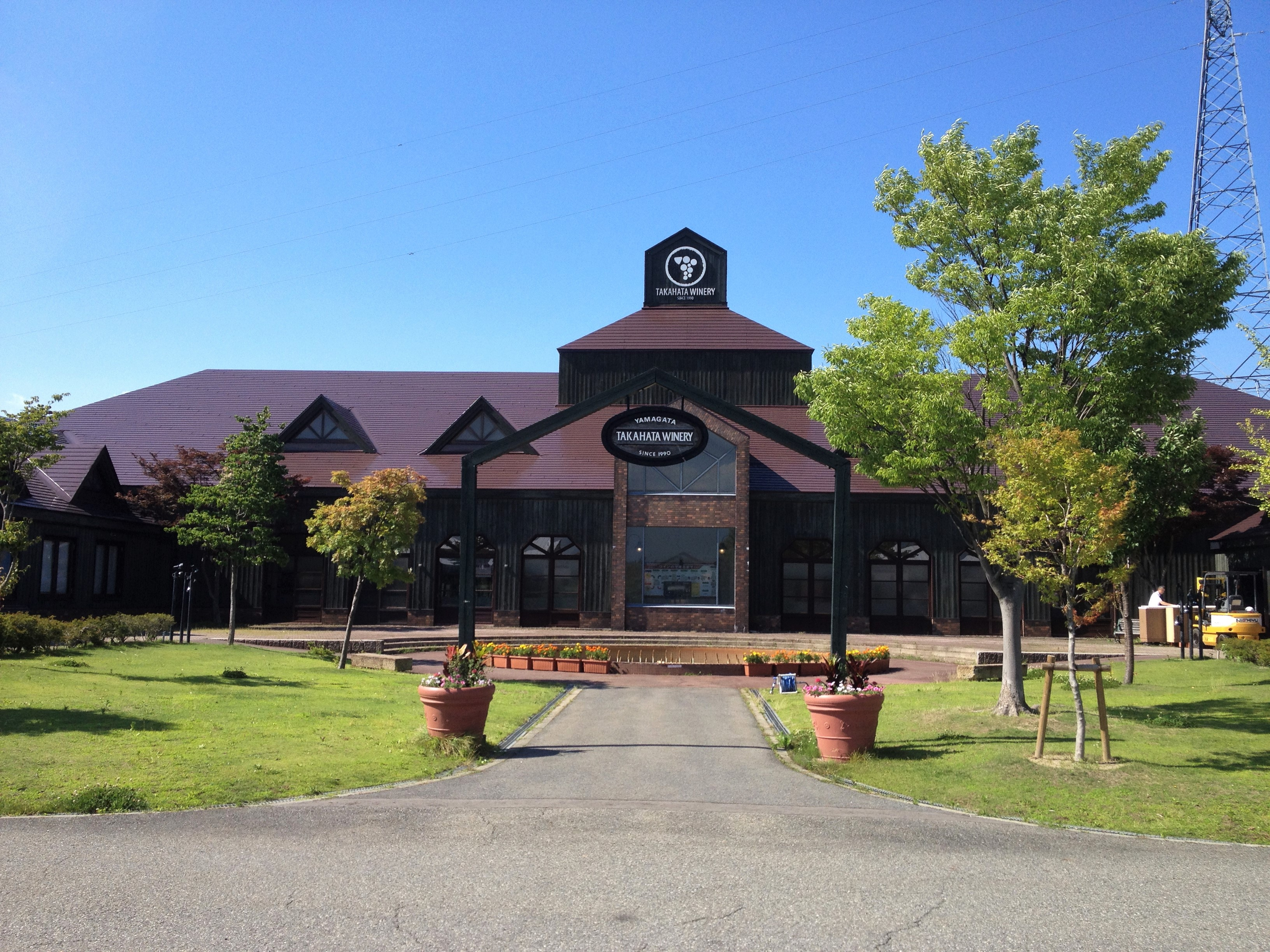
Yamagata Takahata Winery

Takahata (高畠町, Takahata-machi) is a town located in Yamagata Prefecture, Japan. As of 1 April 2019, the town had an estimated population of 23,367, in 7629 households, and a population density of 130 persons per km^{2}. The total area of the town is 180.26 square kilometres (70 sq mi).

== Geography ==
Takahata is located in mountainous southeastern Yamagata Prefecture. The Mogami River flows through the town.

=== Neighboring municipalities ===
- Fukushima Prefecture
  - Fukushima
- Miyagi Prefecture
  - Shichikashuku
- Yamagata Prefecture
  - Kaminoyama
  - Kawanishi
  - Nan'yō
  - Yonezawa

=== Climate ===
Takahata has a humid continental climate (Köppen climate classification Cfa/Dfa) with large seasonal temperature differences, with warm to hot (and often humid) summers and cold (sometimes severely cold) winters. Precipitation is significant throughout the year, but is heaviest from August to October. The average annual temperature in Takahata is 11.2 °C (52.2 °F). The average annual rainfall is 1,283.0 mm (50.51 in) with July as the wettest month. The temperatures are highest on average in August, at around 24.3 °C (75.7 °F), and lowest in January, at around −0.9 °C (30.4 °F).

Climate data for Takahata, elevation 220 m (720 ft), (1991−2020 normals, extremes 1976−present)
Month	Jan	Feb	Mar	Apr	May	Jun	Jul	Aug	Sep	Oct	Nov	Dec	Year
Record high °C (°F)	13.8 (56.8)	15.5 (59.9)	21.7 (71.1)	29.7 (85.5)	35.2 (95.4)	35.4 (95.7)	36.9 (98.4)	38.1 (100.6)	36.8 (98.2)	30.4 (86.7)	24.9 (76.8)	19.0 (66.2)	38.1 (100.6)
Mean daily maximum °C (°F)	2.4 (36.3)	3.4 (38.1)	7.8 (46.0)	15.6 (60.1)	21.9 (71.4)	25.4 (77.7)	28.5 (83.3)	30.2 (86.4)	25.6 (78.1)	19.2 (66.6)	12.1 (53.8)	5.4 (41.7)	16.5 (61.6)
Daily mean °C (°F)	−0.9 (30.4)	−0.6 (30.9)	2.6 (36.7)	9.1 (48.4)	15.3 (59.5)	19.6 (67.3)	23.2 (73.8)	24.3 (75.7)	19.9 (67.8)	13.2 (55.8)	6.8 (44.2)	1.6 (34.9)	11.2 (52.1)
Mean daily minimum °C (°F)	−4.2 (24.4)	−4.4 (24.1)	−1.8 (28.8)	3.1 (37.6)	9.0 (48.2)	14.4 (57.9)	19.0 (66.2)	19.7 (67.5)	15.5 (59.9)	8.5 (47.3)	2.5 (36.5)	−1.6 (29.1)	6.6 (44.0)
Record low °C (°F)	−14.2 (6.4)	−19.2 (−2.6)	−13.0 (8.6)	−6.5 (20.3)	−0.7 (30.7)	4.8 (40.6)	9.6 (49.3)	10.3 (50.5)	3.9 (39.0)	−1.7 (28.9)	−7.8 (18.0)	−16.1 (3.0)	−19.2 (−2.6)
Average precipitation mm (inches)	113.0 (4.45)	69.5 (2.74)	74.6 (2.94)	65.4 (2.57)	75.7 (2.98)	103.6 (4.08)	184.9 (7.28)	143.4 (5.65)	124.6 (4.91)	114.6 (4.51)	92.1 (3.63)	119.0 (4.69)	1,283 (50.51)
Average precipitation days (≥ 1.0 mm)	19.5	15.3	13.7	10.8	9.6	10.0	13.7	10.5	10.9	11.3	14.0	18.1	157.4
Mean monthly sunshine hours	60.1	87.1	138.7	174.2	198.4	168.0	151.3	186.4	137.0	126.0	92.3	58.9	1,578.5
Source: Japan Meteorological Agency

== Demographics ==
Per Japanese census data, the population of Takahata has declined slightly in recent decades.

Historical population
Year	Pop.	±%
1960	32,136	—
1970	27,760	−13.6%
1980	27,440	−1.2%
1990	27,510	+0.3%
2000	26,807	−2.6%
2010	25,025	−6.6%
2020	22,463	−10.2%

== History ==
The area of present-day Takahata was part of ancient Dewa Province. During the Edo period, it was a castle town ruled by a branch of the Oda clan until their transfer to Tendō Domain, and afterwards a portion was controlled by the Yonezawa Domain. After the start of the Meiji period, the area became part of Higashiokitama District, Yamagata Prefecture. The village of Takahata was established on April 1, 1889, with the creation of the modern municipalities system. It was elevated to town status on December 12, 1895, and the kanji used to write its name assumed its present form in January 1905.

== Economy ==
The economy of Takahata is based on agriculture and forestry. The town is noted for its production Delaware grapes and for its wine.

== Education ==
Takahata has six public elementary schools and one public middle school operated by the town government, and one public high school operated by the Yamagata Prefectural Board of Education. .

== Transportation ==
=== Railway ===
East Japan Railway Company - Yamagata Shinkansen

- Takahata

East Japan Railway Company - Ōu Main Line

- Takahata

=== Highway ===
- Tōhoku-Chūō Expressway – Nanyō-Takahata interchange
- National Route 13
- National Route 113
- National Route 339
- National Route 347

== Sister cities ==
- Singleton, New South Wales, Australia

== Local attractions ==
- site of Takahata Castle
- Hinata Caves, National Historic Site
- Ōdachi Caves, National Historic Site
- Hibakoiwa Caves, National Historic Site
- Ichinosawa Caves, National Historic Site

== Notable people ==
- Yuko Aoki, model
- Shunsaku Kudō, Imperial Japanese Navy officer
