= Toyotarō Yūki =

Japanese banker

- 結城 豊太郎
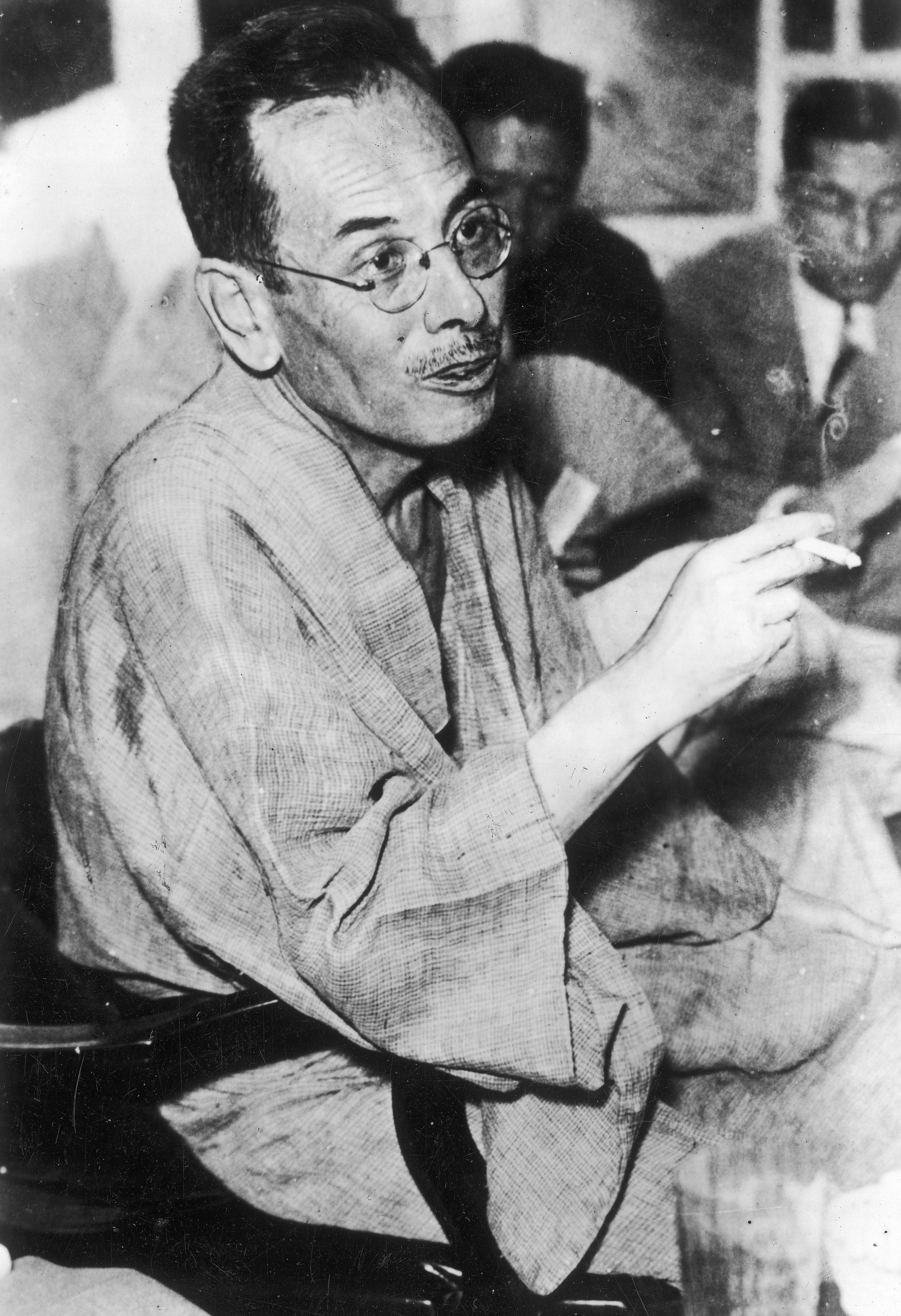

Governor of the Bank of Japan
- In office 27 July 1937 – 18 March 1944
- Prime Minister: Fumimaro Konoe; Kiichiro Hiranuma; Nobuyuki Abe; Mitsumasa Yonai; Hideki Tojo
- Preceded by: Shigeaki Ikeda
- Succeeded by: Keizo Shibusawa

Minister of Finance
- In office 2 February 1937 – 4 June 1937
- Prime Minister: Senjūrō Hayashi
- Preceded by: Eiichi Baba
- Succeeded by: Okinori Kaya

Minister of Colonial Affairs
- In office 2 February 1937 – 4 June 1937
- Prime Minister: Senjūrō Hayashi
- Preceded by: Hidejirō Nagata
- Succeeded by: Sonyu Ōtani

Member of the House of Peers
- In office 31 May 1937 – 20 March 1946 Nominated by the Emperor

Personal details
- Born: 24 May 1877 Nan'yō, Yamagata, Japan
- Died: 1 August 1951 (aged 74)
- Resting place: Aoyama Cemetery
- Party: Independent
- Education: Tokyo Imperial University

Toyotarō Yūki (結城 豊太郎, Yūki Toyotarō; 24 May 1877 – 1 August 1951) was a central banker in the Empire of Japan, serving as the 15th Governor of the Bank of Japan and twice as a cabinet minister.

== Biography ==
Yūki was born in the onsen resort of Akayu in what is now part of Nan'yō, Yamagata Prefecture, where his father was a sake brewer. After graduating from Tokyo Imperial University with a degree in political science, he obtained a position at the Bank of Japan from January 1904. Yūki was promoted rapidly, serving as auditor in the bank's New York City branch, branch manager in Kyoto, Corporate Secretary, and branch manager in Osaka. In 1918, at the recommendation of Junnosuke Inoue, Yūki was appointed to the Board of Directors, while still maintaining his post as Osaka branch manager. However, following the assassination of Yasuda Zenjirō, Yūki left the Bank of Japan to join the Board of Directors for the Yasuda zaibatsu in November 1921, and was appointed Managing Director of Yasuda Bank the same year.

As head of Yasuda Bank, Yūki was a member of a committee which drafted "Definite Policies for the Improvement of the Ordinary Banking System in Our Country" in 1926. The report identified a range of significant issues:

Ordinary banks in our country have frequently conducted their business badly. There has been excessive competition among too many small banks with slender means; bankers have been ignorant of the need for reserves to back deposit withdrawals and generally ill-informed about the working of deposit banking; there has been over enthusiastic lending of bank resources in either particular or long-term outlets against securities of real estates in favour of related businesses; there has been serious negligence in establishing a thorough audit system both inside and outside the banks.

The need to address the problems identified in this proposal generally acknowledged. The report was the genesis of a process which led to the Bank Act of 1927.

In March 1929, Yūki left for a tour of Europe. On his return, he established a committee to find was for the Yasuda zaibatsu to weather the Great Depression. From September 1930, Yūki was head of the Industrial Bank of Japan. Yūki was subsequently elected head of the Japan Chamber of Commerce and Industry in January 1937. In February 1937, he was appointed Minister of Finance in the Hayashi administration, serving to June 1937. The concurrently also held the portfolio of Minister of Colonial Affairs for the same period. From May 1937, Yūki was also appointed to a seat in the Upper House of the Diet of Japan.

During the 1st Konoe administration, on 27 July 1937, Yūki returned to the Bank of Japan as governor, replacing Shigeaki Ikeda. He held the post until 18 March 1944. During Yūki's tenure, the bank was reorganized in 1942. However, Yūki was removed from his office by the Finance Minister with the support of the Tōjō cabinet in 1944. Yuki had opposed giving the Munitions Minister the authority to approve loans to munitions companies without consultation with the bank, and Tōjō was both Prime Minister and Munitions Minister at the time Following World War II, Yūki retired from public life, and moved to Mie Prefecture, where he became the chief kannushi of the Yuki Jinja Shinto shrine. He died in 1951, and his grave is at the Aoyama Cemetery in Tokyo.

In 1995, the town of Akayu opened a memorial museum in his honor.

== Notes ==
Political offices
Preceded by Eiichi Baba	Minister of Finance; 1937	Succeeded by Kaya Okinori
Preceded by Hidejirō Nagata	Minister of Colonial Affairs; 1937	Succeeded by Sonyu Ōtani
Government offices
Preceded by Shigeaki Ikeda	Governor of the Bank of Japan; 1937–1944	Succeeded by Keizo Shibusawa
