= Hinata Caves =

Jōmon period archaeological site in Takahata, Tōhoku, Japan

- 日向洞窟 (Japanese)
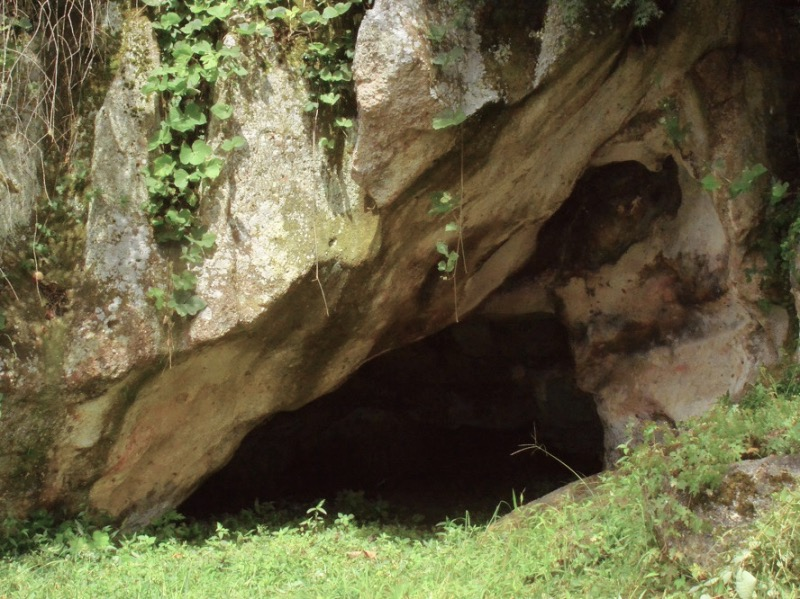
- Hinata Cave entrance

- Hinata Caves Hinata Caves (Japan)
- 38°01′55″N 140°12′15″E
- Type: settlement
- Periods: Jōmon period
- Location: Takahata, Yamagata, Japan
- Region: Tōhoku region

Site notes
- Elevation: 330 m (1,080 ft)
- Excavation dates: 1955
- Archaeologists: Yamagata University
- Public access: Yes (no facilities)

The Hinata Caves (日向洞窟, Hinata dōkutsu) is an archaeological site with a cave dwelling in use from the early through late Jōmon period, located in what is now part of the town of Takahata, Yamagata in the Tōhoku region of Japan. The site was designated a National Historic Site of Japan in 1977.

== Overview ==
The Hinata Caves are a group of cave dwellings at the foot of Mount Tateishi (altitude 230 meters), on the northeastern edge of the Yonezawa Basin in the foothills of the Ōu Mountains. In addition to the main cave, there are 14 other cave dwelling ruins nearby. It is rare to find so many cave dwelling ruins in such a small area. The Hinata Caves has an opening to the south, and consists of two natural caves and two rock shelters, both protected by an overhanging cliff of tuff, with a stream of water and a marsh in front. The entrance has a height of 3.5 meters, and the main cave extends into the hillside for 14 meters, with a width of 5 meters.

Archaeological excavations by Yamagata University beginning in 1955 revealed five stratification layers, with the uppermost two layers containing earthenware and stone tools and weapons from the late Jōmon period. The lowermost layer contained relics from the early Jōmon period, so this cave became an important reference for the development of Jōmon culture over the span of 10,000 years. Find included the oldest examples of ridgeline Jōmon pottery and is the northernmost find of Jōmon pottery on the Sea of Japan side of Japan. Multiple other styles of Jōmon pottery were found. The bones of numerous animals (bears, deer, foxes, ducks, salmon etc.) were also found. The good preservation of the remains can be partly attributed to local legend that these caves and the surrounding forest was the dwelling place of demons in the Edo period, and were strictly off limits.

The site is one of several similar cave dwelling sites which have been found in the vicinity. The site is approximately 30 minutes by car from Takahata Station on the Yamagata Shinkansen.

== See also ==
- List of Historic Sites of Japan (Yamagata)
- Ichinosawa Caves
- Ōdachi Caves
