= Yuko Aoki =

Former Japanese bikini model and singer (born 1977)

- 青木 裕子
- Born: February 5, 1977 (age 49); Yamagata Prefecture, Japan
- Occupations: Model; Actress
- Years active: 1995–2010
- Height: 1.60 m (5 ft 3 in)
- Spouse: Unknown (m. 2010)

Yuko Aoki (青木 裕子, Aoki Yūko) (born on February 5, 1977, in Takahata, Yamagata Prefecture, Japan) is a former Japanese bikini model and singer.

== Career ==
She first started modeling in 1995, and became a "Visual Queen of the Year" at Fuji TV for 1996. She was a frequent cover girl on Japanese bikini photo magazines in the late 1990s. She appeared in the advertising campaign for Suntory's Milpower (ミルパワー, mirupawaa) product.

Aoki stopped modeling in 1998, and officially retired from modeling in 2000 to focus on a music career.

In February 1998, Aoki held a healing music concert at Casals Hall, near Ochanomizu Station in Tokyo. In June 1999, she sought to raise money through her singing for the refugees in Kosovo. On December 16, 2002, Aoki revealed a chocolate covered statue of David Beckham in Tokyo to generate publicity. In 2003 she released an album titled Blue on the Universal Japan label. She is currently the lead vocalist for the band Icy Blue. She has been the cover model for (and subject of major articles in) nearly fifty issues of various magazines in Japan, including Weekly Playboy's March 12, 1996 issue.

Aoki started appearing for professional wrestling promotion Hustle in 2005, acting primarily as an announcer. In February 2006, Yuko got in a storyline in which she would audition for a full-time job in Hustle, but general manager Hiroko Suzuki verbally attacked her and made her cry until Wataru Sakata came to her rescue. Aoki became Sakata's valet, and helped him to win a match against Hiroko's husband Kenzo Suzuki.

=== Private life ===
In 2010, she retired from the entertainment industry after getting married. After her retirement, while raising children, she worked at her parents' conveyor belt sushi restaurant in Yonezawa.
