= Miyauchi, Yamagata =

Miyauchi 宮内町
- Former municipality
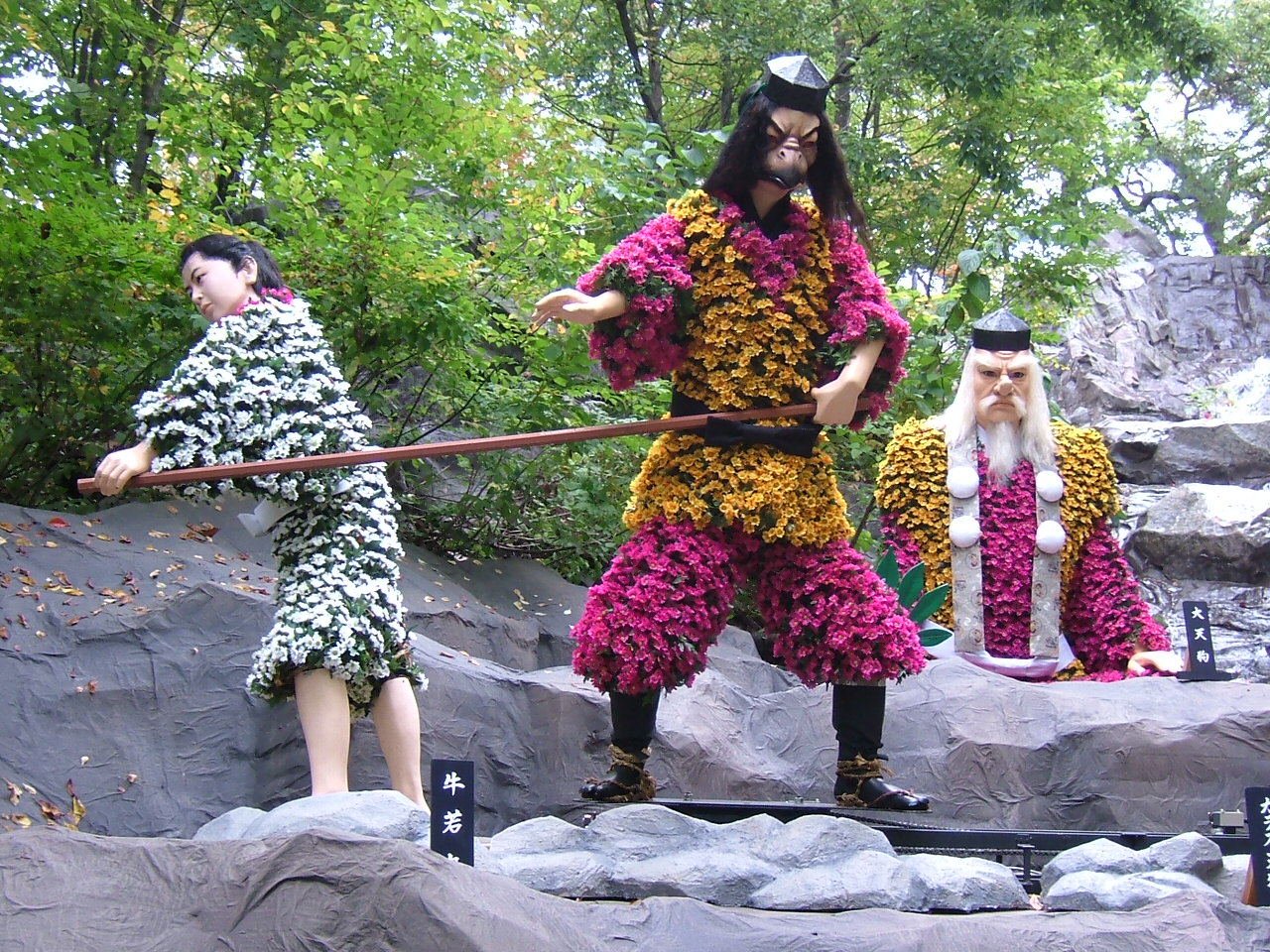
- Three chrysanthemum dolls at the Kiku Ningyō Festival, 2005

- Location in Japan
- Coordinates: 38°04′N 140°08′E
- Country: Japan
- Region: Tōhoku
- Prefecture: Yamagata Prefecture
- District: Higashiokitama District
- Merged: April 1, 1967 (now part of Nan'yō)

Area
  - Total: 90.61 km^{2} (34.98 sq mi)

Population (1965)
  - Total: 17,939
  - Density: 198/km^{2} (510/sq mi)
- Time zone: UTC+09:00 (JST)

Miyauchi (宮内町, Miyauchi-chō) was a town located in Higashiokitama District, Yamagata Prefecture, Japan.

As of 1965, the town had an estimated population of 17,939 and a population density of 198 persons per km^{2}. The total area was 90.61 km^{2}.

On April 1, 1967, Miyauchi was merged into the expanded city of Nan'yō and thus no longer exists as an independent municipality.

== History ==
The village of Miyauchi was established on April 1, 1889, with the establishment of the municipalities system. It was raised to town status on February 1, 1955, by merging with the villages of Urushiyama, Yoshino, and Kaneyama. On April 1, 1967, the town of Miyauchi merged with the town of Akayu and the village of Wagō to form the city of Nan'yō

== Local attractions ==
The Kumano-taisha Shrine is one of the three great Kumano Shrines in Japan, whose origins date back to the 9th century. Every July, the shrine is the focus of Miyauchi's main festival, when omikoshi (portable shrines) are paraded around the town before being returned to the main shrine.

Sosho Park (双松公園, Sōshō Kōen) holds a rose festival in June, and a chrysanthemum doll festival (菊人形祭り, kiku ningyō matsuri) is held in October. The festival's highlight is a series of human dolls made from locally grown chrysanthemums.

The Hygeia Park onsen, which contains a small Isabella Bird Memorial Exhibition, is also situated in the town

== Transportation ==
=== Highway ===
- Japan National Route 113

=== Rail ===
- Yamagata Railway Company – Flower Nagai Line
  - Miyauchi - Orihata
