= Sonyu Ōtani =

Japanese Shin Buddhist priest and politician

- 大谷 尊由
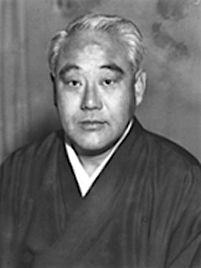
- Ōtani in 1937

Minister of Colonial Affairs
- In office 4 June 1937 – 26 May 1938
- Prime Minister: Fumimaro Konoe
- Preceded by: Toyotarō Yūki
- Succeeded by: Kazushige Ugaki

Member of the House of Peers
- In office 4 April 1928 – 1 August 1939 Nominated by the Emperor

Personal details
- Born: 19 August 1886 Kyoto, Japan
- Died: 1 August 1939 (aged 52) Zhangjiakou, China
- Occupation: Buddhist priest, politician

Sonyu Ōtani (大谷 尊由, Ōtani Son'yu; 19 August 1886 – 1 August 1939) was a Japanese Shin Buddhist priest and politician who served as a member of the House of Peers of the Diet of Japan and once as a cabinet minister.

== Biography ==
Ōtani was born in Kyoto as the son of Ōtani Koson, the 21st hereditary head of the Jōdo Shinshū Buddhist sect Honganji-ha. His brother, Ōtani Kōzui was the 22nd head of the sect, and a noted explorer of Central Asia, while his sister was Takeko Kujō, a noted poet and humanitarian.

In 1904, Ōtani was sent by Honganji-ha to the Liaodong Peninsula, to minister to Japanese forces during the Russo-Japanese War. In December 1905, he was ordered the Qing dynasty China to lay the foundations for a network of Jōdo Shinshū temples and missionary activities. In September 1907, he made a tour through Southeast Asia before returning to Japan to assume his duties as an official at the Nishi Hongan-ji in Kyoto. He travelled to Korea in 1909 to assist in the development of a network of Jōdo Shinshū temples, and departed for London in May 1910. However, due to the financial scandal which enveloped his brother, Ōtani Kōzui, then 22nd head of the sect, he was forced to curtail his trip in July 1910. He became secretary-general of the sect in March 1921.

In October 1925, Ōtani left for a tour of the United States and Canada, returning to Japan at the end of February 1926. On 4 April 1928, he was appointed to a seat in the House of Peers.

On 4 June 1937, he was asked by Prime Minister Fumimaro Konoe to accept the post of Minister of Colonial Affairs, which he held to 26 May 1938. In November 1938, he assumed the post of Director of the North China Development Company, a subsidiary of the South Manchuria Railway dedicated to the economic development of the areas of northern China under occupation by Japan. From July 1939, he was also a member of the East Asia Development Board. He died in Zhangjiakou, Hebei Province, China in 1939.
