= Buddhist Women's Association =

International Shin Buddhist auxiliary organisation

The Buddhist Women's Association (BWA) is the English name of the worldwide auxiliary lay organization of the Nishi Hongwanji-ha branch of Jodo Shinshu Buddhism. Its Japanese name is Fujinkai. Many Jodo Shinshu temples in Japan, mainland United States, Hawaii, South America, and Canada have BWA chapters. The honorary head of the worldwide BWA is, traditionally, always the spouse (o-urakata) of the current Nishi Hongwnaji-ha monshu (head abbot); at this time, this position is held by the Lady Noriko Ohtani.

== History ==
The BWA or Fujinkai was founded in Japan in the early 20th century by Takeko Kujō (1887–1928), a daughter of Koson Ohtani, the 21st monshu (head abbot) of the Nishi Hongwanji-ha. Takeko Kujo was in her early twenties at the time she founded the Fujinkai. She also founded Asoka Hospital, one of Japan's first modern medical centers. She died in Tokyo, Japan after contracting an illness during her charitable work in the city's slums following the Great Kanto earthquake. Soon, BWA chapters were established in every Jodo Shinshu temple in Japan, and later in the United States and other overseas areas as many Japanese began emigrating in the late 19th century and early 20th century. These local fujinkai provided spiritual, financial and community support to immigrant Japanese. The BWA in the United States is an auxiliary organization of the Buddhist Churches of America, the mainland United States branch of the Nishi Hongwanji-ha.

After World War II, Lady Yoshiko Ohtani (1918–2000) the spouse of the 23rd Monshu, Kosho Ohtani, visited many temples in Japan and around the world and worked to revive the association. At this time, the first worldwide conferences were held so BWA chapters could communicate. Many BWA chapters observe an annual memorial service in her memory to commemorate her dedication to Buddhism.

BWA chapters have historically been composed of the older female members of a Shin temple sangha. They often prepared and served traditional meals (called otoki) after major services and funerals, and participated in cleaning and upkeep (omigaki) of temples. Although occasionally misunderstood or stereotyped by modern Buddhist scholars as a subservient and outdated identity for ethnic Buddhist women, the BWA in fact is important for the vitality of temple sanghas, particularly in the preservation of Japanese and Japanese-American Buddhist traditions, and oral history. Since Jodo Shinshu temples in the U.S. are growing more ethnically diverse, because of the ongoing Western interest in Buddhism and intermarriage, many non-Japanese female Buddhists are also joining BWA chapters. Many BWA chapters sponsor Dharma lectures, conferences, and other enjoyable social activities for all temple members. BWA members also visit infirm or elderly members who are physically unable to attend temple services. Therefore, the BWA plays an important role in the practice and transmission of traditional Buddhist values such as compassion, community, and gratitude for others.

In the United States, the umbrella organization of BWA chapters across the nation is called the Federation of Buddhist Women's Associations (FBWA) and yearly conferences are held, the location and sponsorship rotating among the various BCA districts. A worldwide conference of BWA chapters is held every four years. The last worldwide conference was held in September 2006 in Honolulu, Hawaii. Men and women both attend these conferences.
