= Inarimori Kofun =

Kofun period burial mound in Nan'yō, Tōhoku, Japan

- 稲荷森古墳 (Japanese)
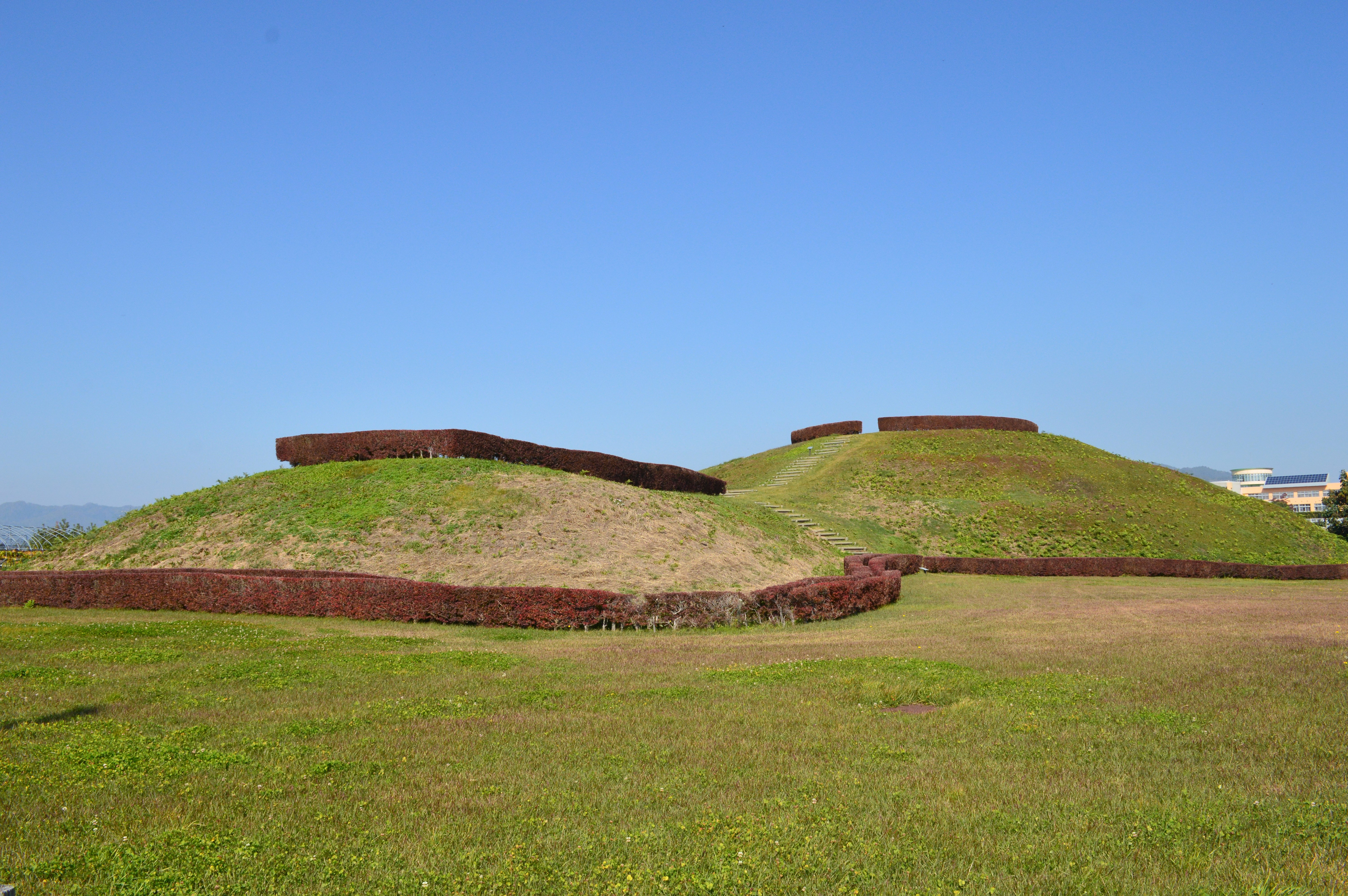
- Inarimori Kofun

- Inarimori Kofun Inarimori Kofun (Japan)
- 38°02′23″N 140°09′26″E
- Type: burial tumulus
- Periods: Kofun period
- Location: Nan'yō, Yamagata, Japan
- Region: Tōhoku region

Site notes
- Public access: yes (archaeological park)

The Inarimori Kofun (稲荷森古墳, Inarimori kofun) is the name of an archaeological site containing a large Kofun period keyhole-shaped burial mound located in what is now part of the city of Nan'yō, Yamagata in the Tōhoku region of northern Japan. The site was designated a National Historic Site of Japan in 1980.

== Overview ==
Discovered around 1933, it has been speculated that the Inarimori tumulus was a kofun from 1938; however, as a preliminary excavation in 1961 found only Heian period Sue ware shards, this hypothesis was discredited. The area also contained the remains of a village from around the middle of the Kofun period. When the mound was cleared in 1977 to 1979, its keyhole-shape was discovered, and more detailed investigation from 1977 to 1978 confirmed that it indeed dates from the latter-half of the 4th century AD. Further investigations were performed by the Nan'yō Board of Education from 1987–88, but the interior of the tomb has never been investigated and no burial chamber has yet been discovered.

The Inarimori kofun has an overall length of 96 meters, making it the largest in Yamagata, and the 7th largest in the Tōhoku region. It was made by partially cutting away of an isolated hill on the right bank of the Yoshino River on the northern edge of the Yonezawa basin. The tomb is orientated to face south-southwest. The circular portion has a diameter of 62 meters and height of 9.2 meters and is constructed in three tiers. The rectangular portion has a width of 30 meters and height of five meters and is constructed in one tier. No fukiishi, haniwa or trace of a moat have been discovered, although shards of Haji ware pottery and some human bones were found.

The kofun and surrounding 10,182.7 hectares are maintained as an archaeological park. It is located approximately five minutes by car from the Akayu Station on the Yamagata Shinkansen.

== See also ==
- List of Historic Sites of Japan (Yamagata)
