= Ōdachi Caves =

Jōmon period archaeological site in Takahata, Tōhoku, Japan

Ōdachi Cave
- 大立洞窟 (Japanese)
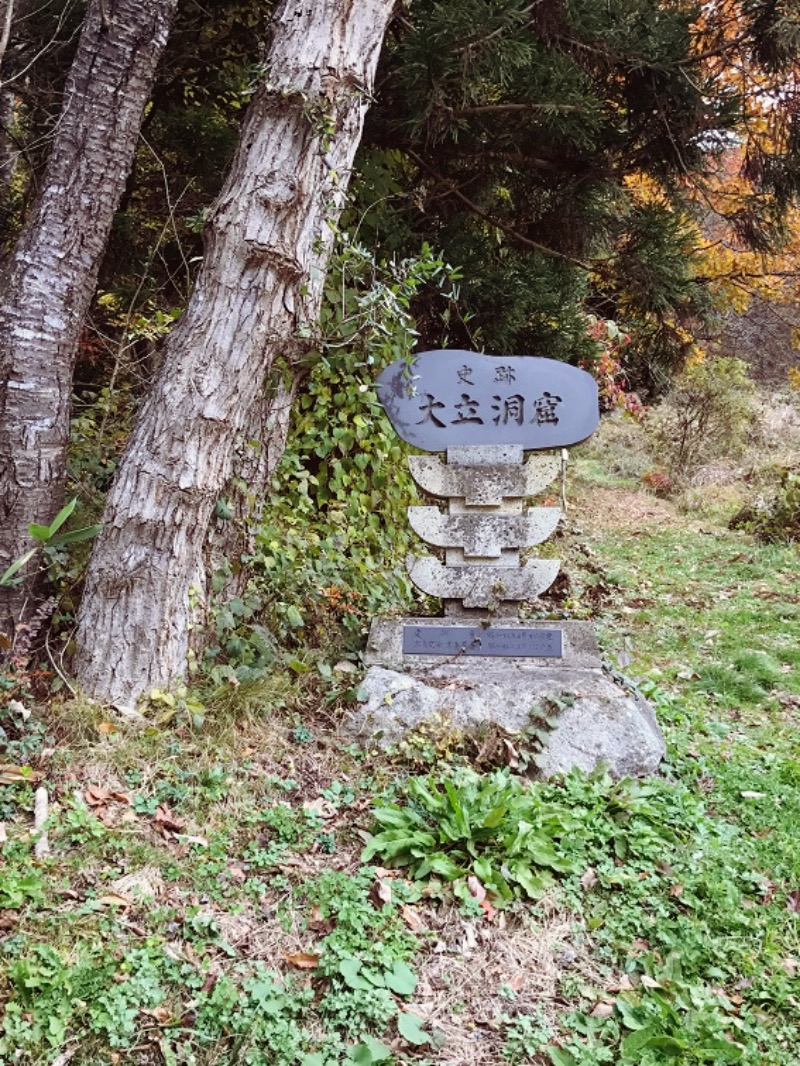
- Ōdachi Cave

- Ōdachi Cave Ōdachi Caves (Japan)
- 38°01′16″N 140°12′29″E
- Type: settlement
- Periods: Jōmon period
- Location: Takahata, Yamagata, Japan
- Region: Tōhoku region

Site notes
- Elevation: 280 m (920 ft)
- Excavation dates: 1974-1978
- Archaeologists: Yamagata Prefectural Museum
- Public access: Yes (no facilities)

The Ōdachi Cave (大立洞窟, Ōdachi dōkutsu) is an archaeological site with a cave dwelling in use in the early Jōmon period (8000 to 2500 BC), located in what is now part of the town of Takahata, Yamagata in the Tōhoku region of northern Japan. The site was designated a National Historic Site of Japan in 1980.

== Overview ==
The Ōdachi Cave is located in the hills of the northeast corner of the Yonezawa Basin in the foothills of the Ōu Mountains, three kilometers north of modern Takahata. The cave was formed by weathering a Tertiary tuff cliffside with an opening facing to the south. It has a frontage of 13 meters and extends 7 meters into the hillside. Archaeological excavations were conducted from 1974 to 1978 by the Yamagata Prefectural Museum and the Yamagata Prefectural Board of Education, and an inclusion layer with artifacts from the early Jōmon period was found. These objects included over 1000 shards of Jōmon earthenware with decoration made by fingernails, and pointed stone tools. The connection between the groups which lived in these caves, and those of nearby Hinata Caves and the Ichinosawa Cave is not certain, but it is believed that residents moved between these settlements due to similarity in earthenware decorative designs. In addition, as a result of analyzing the sedimentary soil from the earthenware excavation layer, it was confirmed that it contained pollen of the genus Larix (Larch), indicating that the climate during this period was slightly cooler than at present.

The site is one of several similar cave dwelling sites which have been found in the vicinity. The site is located approximately 20 minutes by car from Takahata Station on the Yamagata Shinkansen.

== See also ==
- List of Historic Sites of Japan (Yamagata)
- Hinata Caves
- Ichinosawa Cave
