= Takeko Kujō =

- 九条 武子
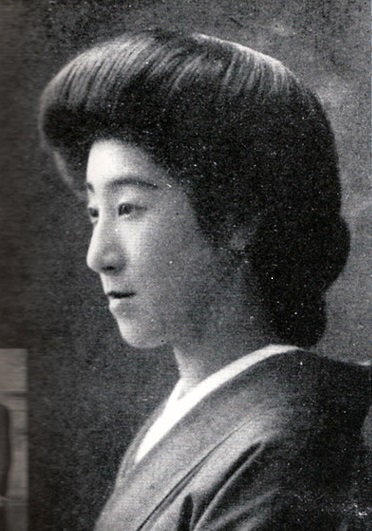
- Born: September 7, 1887; Kyoto, Japan
- Died: February 7, 1928 (aged 40); Harajuku, Tokyo, Japan
- Occupations: Educator, poet

Takeko Kujō (Japanese: 九条 武子, Kujō Takeko, September 7, 1887 – February 7, 1928) was a Japanese educator and poet. She was one of the founders of the Buddhist Women's Association.

== Biography ==
Kujō was born in Kyoto as the daughter of Ōtani Kōson (Myōnyo), the 21st abbot of the Nishi Hongan-ji and the head of the Honganji-ha Jōdo Shinshū branch of Japanese Buddhism. Her elder brother, Ōtani Kōzui was the 22nd abbot of the temple, and a noted explorer of Central Asia, while another brother, was Ōtani Sonyu, was a politician who served in the House of Peers. Her mother was the daughter of a samurai from Kii Domain and the second wife of her father. She was educated at the predecessor to the Kyoto Women's University.

In 1903, on the death of her father, she came into the care of her brother Kozui. Her public life began during the Russo-Japanese War of 1904–1905, when she co-founded the Buddhist Women's Association, which was active in sending care packages to soldiers at the front, and to helping families who had lost their sons in combat.

In 1909, she entered into an arranged marriage with Baron Kujō Yoshimasa, the brother of her sister-in-law. She went to England where her husband attended Cambridge University. She returned to Japan after one year, leaving her husband (who was later assigned to the branch of the Yokohama Specie Bank in London) behind. The couple lived apart for most of their lives.

After the 1923 Great Kantō earthquake which devastated Tokyo and the surrounding Kantō region, Kujō sponsored various humanitarian efforts, which led to the reconstruction of the Tsukiji Hongan-ji temple, and the foundation of Asoka Hospital, one of Japan's first modern medical centers.

Kujō was also a noted poet, having studied under Nobutsuna Sasaki. She wrote numerous poems and gathas about her Nembutsu faith, publishing her first volume of poetry, Kinrei (金)鈴) in 1920, followed by a stage play Rakuhoku (洛北) in 1925. A second volume of poetry followed in 1928, Kunzen (薫染) and an autobiography, Shirokujaku (白孔雀) in 1930.

On February 7, 1928, she contracted blood poisoning due to overexertion from her efforts in the earthquake reconstruction projects and died at the age of 40. Throughout the Honganji-ha Jōdo Shinshū denomination, Takeko Kujō's memorial is formally commemorated under the name Kisaragi-ki.
