= Akayu, Yamagata =

Akayu 赤湯町
- Former municipality
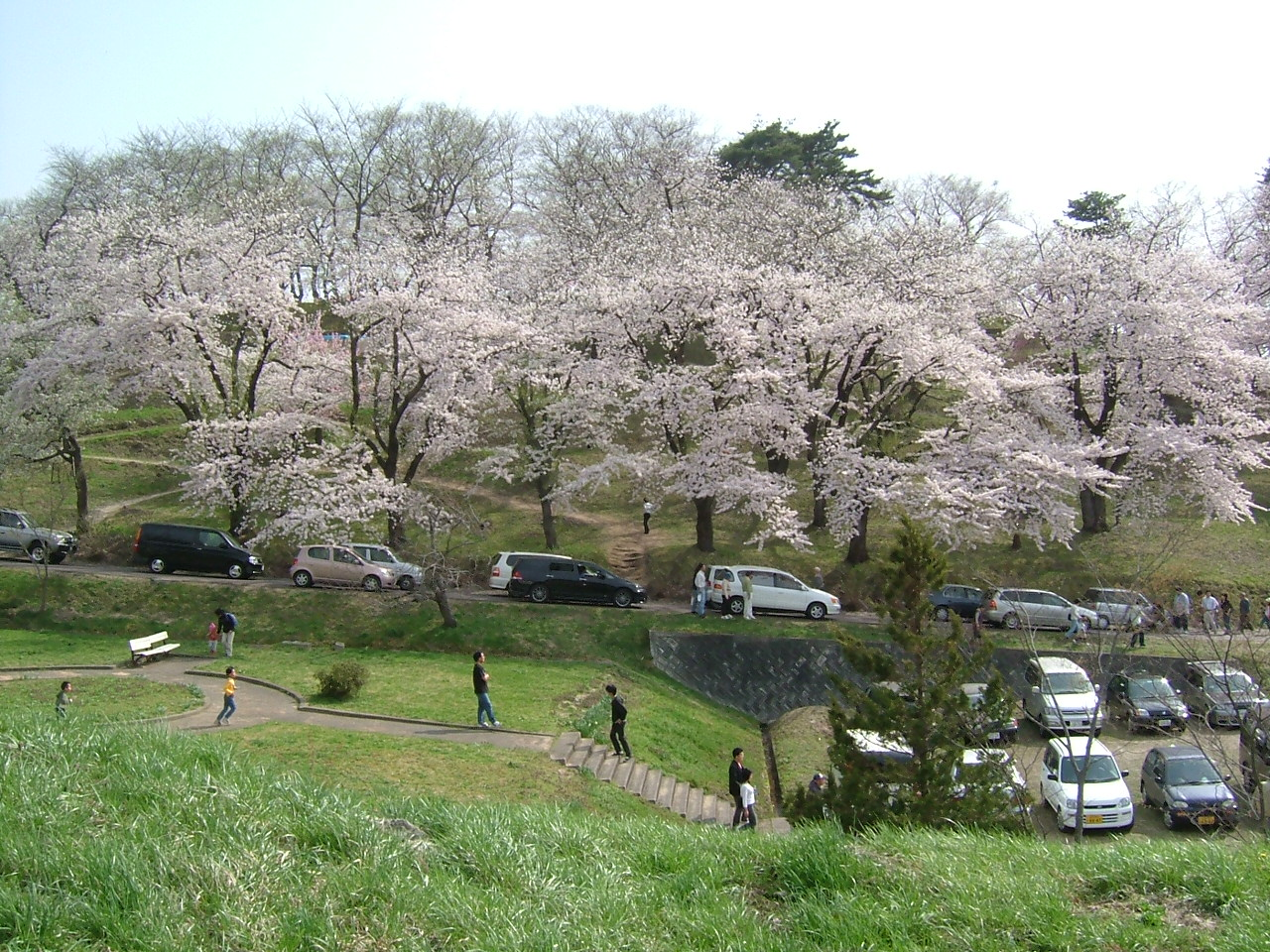
- Cherry blossoms in Eboshiyama Park, Akayu

- Location in Japan
- Coordinates: 38°03′N 140°11′E
- Country: Japan
- Region: (Tōhoku)
- Prefecture: Yamagata Prefecture
- District: Higashiokitama District
- Merged: April 1, 1967 (now part of Nan'yō)

Area
  - Total: 41.10 km^{2} (15.87 sq mi)

Population (1965)
  - Total: 12,860
  - Density: 313/km^{2} (810/sq mi)
- Time zone: UTC+09:00 (JST)

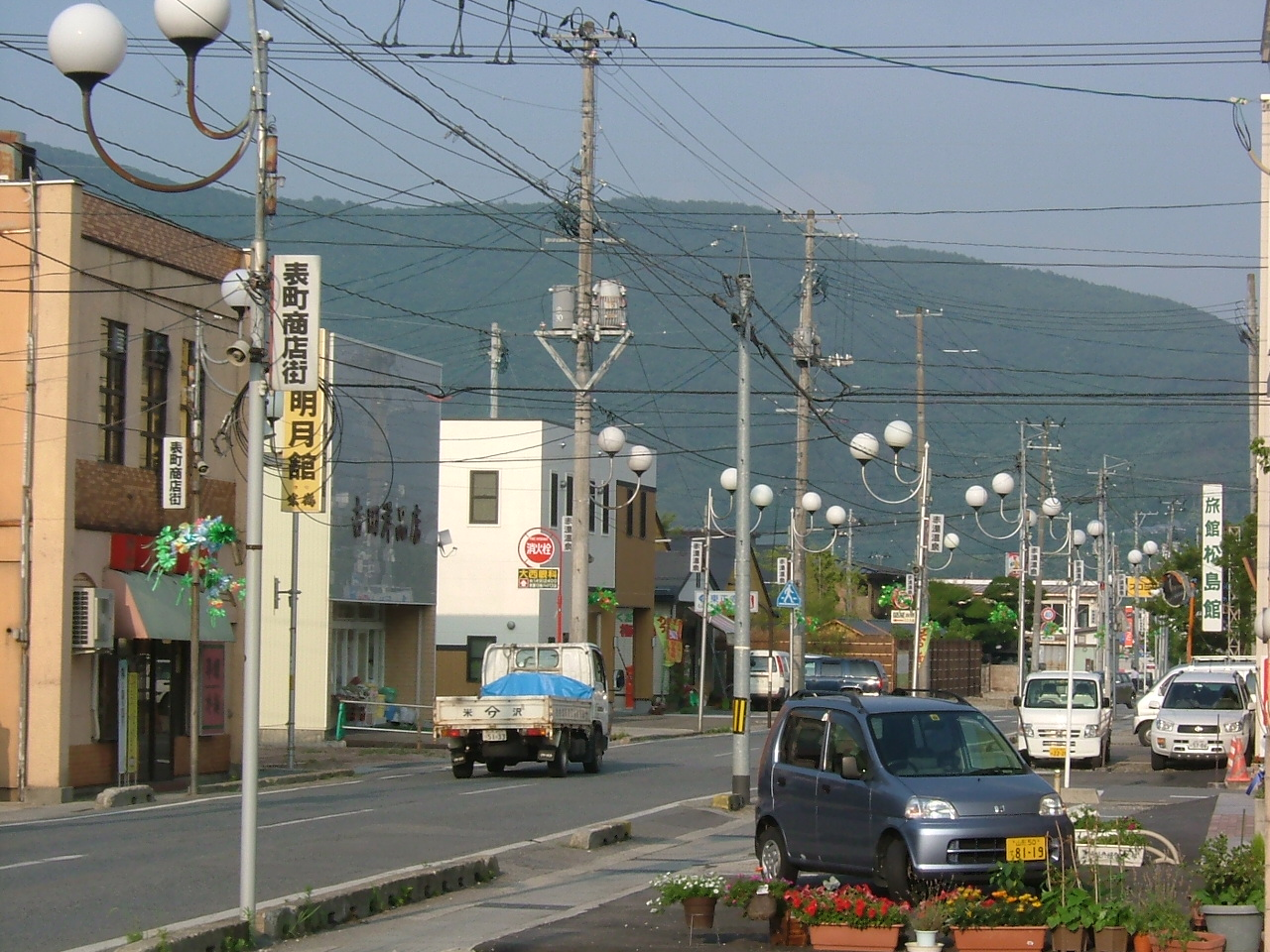
Akayu main street in 2005

Akayu (赤湯町, Akayu-chō) was a town located in Higashiokitama District, Yamagata Prefecture, Japan.

As of 1967, the town had an estimated population of 12,860 and a population density of 313 persons per km^{2}. The total area was 41.10 km^{2}.

On April 1, 1967, Akayu was merged into the expanded city of Nan'yō and thus no longer exists as an independent municipality.

== History ==
The village of Akayu was established on April 1, 1889, with the establishment of the municipalities system. It was raised to town status on December 12, 1895. On June 10, 1955, the village of Nakagawa was annexed by Akayu. On March 21, 1957, the Nakayama neighborhood of Akayu was annexed by the neighboring city of Kaminoyama. On April 1, 1967, the town of Akayu merged with the town of Miyauchi and the village of Wagō to form the city of Nan'yō.

=== Isabella Bird ===
English travel writer Isabella Bird visited Akayu on her travels in Japan in 1878. In Unbeaten Tracks in Japan she wrote of Akayu:

the frequented watering-place of Akayu in the north, is a perfect garden of Eden, 'tilled with a pencil instead of a plough,' growing in rich profusion rice, cotton, maize, tobacco, hemp, indigo, beans, egg-plants, walnuts, melons, cucumbers, persimmons, apricots, pomegranates; a smiling and plenteous land, an Asiatic Arcadia, prosperous and independent, all its bounteous acres belonging to those who cultivate them, who live under their vines, figs, and pomegranates, free from oppression--a remarkable spectacle under an Asiatic despotism.

== Local attractions ==
Akayu is most famous for Akayu Onsen (赤湯温泉), a series of ryokan famed for their natural hot-springs which are believed to have medicinal properties. The town's name, which is literally translated as "red hot water", derives from a story in 1093. It is said that the feudal chief of Mutsu Province, Minamoto no Yoshitsuna took a wounded soldier to a hot spring bath. His blood immediately turned the water red and the wound closed.

Eboshiyama Park (烏帽子山公園) is regarded as one of the top 100 cherry blossom viewing sites in Japan, and in 2000, an estimated 25,000 people came to the town in April to enjoy hanami ("flower viewing") parties. The district also has an internationally recognised hang-gliding venue, the Sky Park, which hosted the Third Women's Hang Gliding Championships in 1993.

Akayu's most famous ex-resident is Toyotarō Yūki, a former governor of the Bank of Japan, and the town has a museum devoted to his life.

== Transportation ==
=== Highway ===
- Japan National Route 13
- Japan National Route 113

=== Rail ===
- JR East – Ōu Main Line
  - Nakagawa – Uzen-Nakayama
