= Heihachirō Kojima =

Japanese photographer

Heihachirō Kojima (小島 平八郎, Kojima Heihachirō; 1895–1973) was a Japanese photographer.
