= Keiichirō Yoshino =

Japanese photographer

Keiichirō Yoshino (吉野 銈一郎, Yoshino Keiichirō; 1895–1983) was a Japanese photographer.
