= Takahata Station =

Railway station in Takahata, Yamagata Prefecture, Japan

Takahata Station 高畠駅
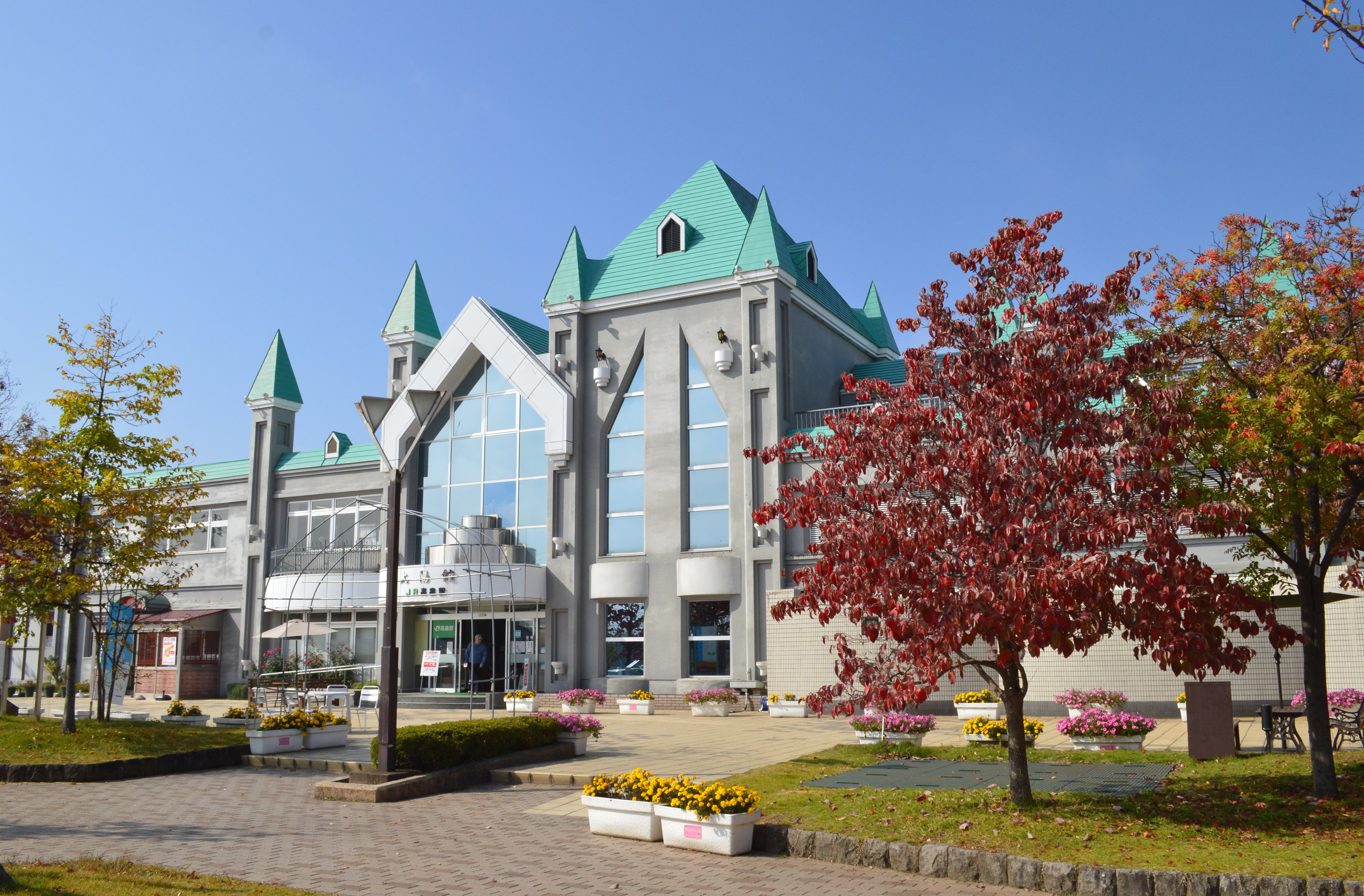
- East side of Takahata Station in October 2015

General information
- Location: 200-1 Yamazaki, Takahata-machi, Higashiokitama District, Yamagata-ken 999–2173; Japan
- Coordinates: 37°59′33″N 140°09′10″E
- Operator: JR East
- Lines: Yamagata Shinkansen; Ōu Main Line
- Distance: 49.9 km (31.0 mi) from Fukushima
- Platforms: 2 side platforms
- Tracks: 2

Construction
- Structure type: At grade

Other information
- Status: Staffed (Midori no Madoguchi)

History
- Opened: 21 April 1900; 126 years ago
- Former names: Nukanome (until 1991)

Passengers
- FY2018: 844 daily

Services
Preceding station	JR East	Following station
Yonezawa towards Tokyo	Yamagata Shinkansen Tsubasa	Akayu towards Shinjō
Oitama towards Fukushima	Yamagata Line	Akayu towards Shinjō
Location
- Location within Yamagata Prefecture Location within Japan

Takahata Station (高畠駅, Takahata-eki) is a junction railway station in the city of Takahata, Yamagata, Japan, operated by the East Japan Railway Company (JR East). It is unique in having an onsen hot spa on its premises.

== Lines ==
Takahata Station is served by the Yamagata Shinkansen and Ōu Main Line, and is located 49.9 kilometers from the starting point of both lines at Fukushima Station.

== Station layout ==
Takahata Station has two opposed side platforms connected via a footbridge. The station has a Midori no Madoguchi staffed ticket office.

=== Platforms ===
1	■ Yamagata Shinkansen	for Yamagata, Fukushima, Ōmiya, Tokyo, Yamagata and Shinjō
1	■ Yamagata Line	for Yonezawa, Akayu and Yamagata
2	■ Yamagata Shinkansen	for Yamagata and Shinjō (peak times only)
2	■ Yamagata Line	for Yonezawa, Akayu and Yamagata (peak times only)

== History ==
The station opened on 21 April 1900 as Nukanome Station (糠ノ目駅). It was renamed Takahata on 16 March 1991.

== Passenger statistics ==
In fiscal 2018, the station was used by an average of 844 passengers daily (boarding passengers only).

== Surrounding area ==
- National Route 13
- Takahata Winery

== See also ==
- List of railway stations in Japan
