= Higashiokitama District =

District in Yamagata Prefecture, Japan

Coordinates: 38.012°N 140.084°E

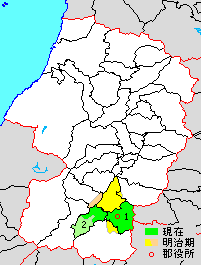
Map showing original extent of Higashiokitami District in Yamagata Prefecture yellow & dark green area=original extent in early Meiji period; light green=area added in Showa period; green=present area; 1=Takahata; 2=Kawanishi

Higashiokitama (東置賜郡, Higashiokitama-gun) is a rural district located in Yamagata Prefecture, Japan. As of December 2013, the district had an estimated population of 40,662 and an area of 324.5 km^{3}. All of the city of Nan'yō and parts of the cities of Yonezawa, Nagai, Kaminoyama were formerly part of Nishiokitami District.

== Towns and villages ==
- Kawanishi
- Takahata

== History ==
Okitami County was an ancient place name in part of Dewa Province. Under the Tokugawa shogunate, the portion which became Higashiokitami district consisted of 113 villages entirely within the area controlled by Yonezawa Domain. The area was designated Yonezawa Prefecture in August 1871, renamed Okitami Prefecture in December 1871, and became part of Yamagata Prefecture in 1876. Higashiokitami District was created on November 1, 1878. With the establishment of the municipalities system on April 1, 1889, it was organized into one town (Miyauchi) and 19 villages.

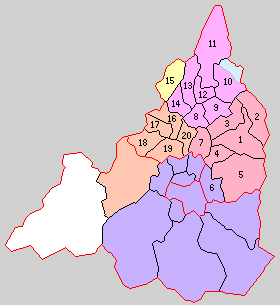
Historic Map of Higashiokitami District: 1. Takahata; 2. Niijuku; 3. Yashiro; 4. Kameoka; 5. Wada; 6. Kamigo; 7. Nukanome; 8. Okigo; 9. Akayu; 10. Nakagawa; 11. Yoshino; 12. Miyauchi; 13. Urushiyama; 14. Nashigo; 15. Isazawa; 16. Otsuka; 17. Inukawa; 18. Komatsu; 19. Chugun; 20. Yoshijima; Purple=to Yonezawa City; Peach=to Nanyo City; Yellow=to Nagai City; Blue=to Kaminoyama City; Orange=Kawanishi Town;Red=Takahata Town Town

- On October 22, 1890 Komatsu was raised to town status
- On December 12, 1895 Takahata and Akayu were raised to town status
- On October 1, 1954 Shago was raised to town status
- On January 1, 1955 Komatsu merges with four neighboring villages to become the town of Kawanishi.
- On February 1, 1955 Miyauchi was raised to town status
- On April 1, 1955 Shago was absorbed into Takahata.
- On April 1, 1967 Miyauchi and Akayu merge to form the city of Nanyo.
