= List of tallest buildings by Japanese prefecture =

This list of tallest buildings in by Japanese prefecture ranks buildings in Japan according to prefecture.

== Tallest buildings ==
Prefecture	City	Name	Image	Height m (ft)	Floors	Year	Coordinates	Refs
Aichi	Nagoya	Midland Square		247 (810)	47	2006	35°10′14″N 136°53′06″E	
Akita	Akita	Belldome Landmark Akita		95 (313)	30	2003	39°43′05″N 140°07′08″E	
Aomori	Aomori	Aomori Prefecture Tourist Center		76 (249)	15	1986	40°49′47″N 140°44′28″E	
Chiba	Chiba	APA Hotel & Resort Tokyo Bay Makuhari		181 (593)	50	1993	35°38′38.5″N 140°02′13″E	
Ehime	Imabari	Imabari Kokusai Hotel		102 (334)	22	1996	34°03′44″N 133°00′2″E	
Fukui	Fukui	Courtyard by Marriott Fukui		120 (393)	28	2024		
Fukuoka	Fukuoka	Island City Ocean & Forest Towers Residence West		161 (528)	46	2022	33°39′50″N 130°25′0″E	
Fukushima	Kōriyama	Big-i		133 (435)	24	2001	37°23′59″N 140°23′17″E	
Gifu	Gifu	Gifu City Tower 43		163 (535)	43	2007	35°24′39″N 136°45′15″E	
Gunma	Maebashi	Gunma Prefectural Government Building		154 (505)	33	1999	36°23′28.5″N 139°03′39.5″E	
Hiroshima	Hiroshima	City Tower Hiroshima		198 (649)	52	2016	34°23′45″N 132°28′30″E	
Hokkaido	Sapporo	ONE Sapporo Station Tower		175 (574)	48	2023		
Hyōgo	Kobe	City Tower Kobe Sannomiya		190 (623)	54	2013	34°41′48″N 135°11′53″E	
Ibaraki	Mito	Ibaraki Prefectural Government Building^{A}		116 (381)	25	1999	36°20′30″N 140°26′48″E	
Ishikawa	Kanazawa	Porte Kanazawa		131 (428)	30	1994	36°34′34.7″N 136°38′57.5″E	
Iwate	Morioka	Malios		92 (302)	20	1997	39°42′04″N 141°08′00.5″E	
Kagawa	Takamatsu	Takamatsu Symbol Tower		151 (496)	30	2004	34°21′08.5″N 134°02′48.5″E	
Kagoshima	Kagoshima	Kagoshima Central Tower		100 (328)	24	2021		
Kanagawa	Yokohama	Yokohama Landmark Tower		296 (970)	70	1993	35°27′17″N 139°37′54″E	
Kōchi	Kōchi	Top One Shikoku		100 (328)	29	1993	33°33′26″N 133°32′51.5″E	
Kumamoto	Kumamoto	The Kumamoto Tower		127 (416)	35	2012	32°47′25″N 130°41′29″E	
Kyoto	Kyoto	Nidec Corporation Headquarters^{B}		101 (330)	22	2003	34°57′4″N 135°42′57″E	
Mie	Yokkaichi	Yokkaichi Port Building		100 (328)	14	1999	34°59′36″N 136°39′26″E	
Miyagi	Sendai	Sendai Trust Tower		180 (591)	37	2010	38°15′23″N 140°52′34″E	
Miyazaki	Miyazaki	Sheraton Grande Ocean Resort		154 (506)	43	1994	31°57′32″N 131°28′11″E	
Nagano	Nagano	NTT DoCoMo Nagano Building^{Z}		75 (246)	16	2000	36°38′54″N 138°11′30″E	
Nagasaki	Nagasaki	Lions Tower		98 (321)	26	2022		
Nara	Nara	Five-storied pagoda at Kōfuku-ji		51 (167)	5	1426	34°40′57″N 135°49′55″E	
Niigata	Niigata	Bandaijima Building		141 (461)	31	2003	37°55′30″N 139°03′34″E	
Ōita	Ōita	Oasis Hiroba 21		102 (337)	21	1998	33°14′17″N 131°36′06″E	
Okayama	Okayama	Okayama The Tower		134 (439)	37	2021		
Okinawa	Naha	Ryu:X Towers		105 (344)	30	2013	26°13′21″N 127°41′40″E	
Osaka	Osaka	Abeno Harukas		300 (984)	60	2014	34°38′45.6″N 135°30′48.2″E	
Saga	Tosu	The Tosu Tower 20		60 (246)	20	2016	33°22′37″N 130°31′11″E	
Saitama	Kawaguchi	Elsa Tower 55		186 (610)	55	1998	35°47′48.5″N 139°43′54″E	
Shiga	Ōtsu	Otsu Prince Hotel		137 (448)	38	1989	35°0′18.5″N 135°53′21″E	
Shimane	Matsue	San-in Godo Bank Building		75 (246)	14	1997	35°27′58″N 135°3′16″E	
Shizuoka	Hamamatsu	Act Tower		213 (699)	45	1994	34°42′20.5″N 137°44′14″E	
Tochigi	Utsunomiya	Utsunomiya Peaks		108 (354)	31	2019	36°33′38.5″N 139°53′17.5″E	
Tokushima	Tokushima	Tokushima Station Building		73 (240)	18	1993	34°04′28.3″N 134°33′2.7″E	
Tokyo	Minato	Azabudai Hills Mori JP Tower^{Y}	Azabudai Hills Mori JP Tower	325.5 (1,068)	64	2023	35°39′39″N 139°44′26″E	
Tottori	Tottori	Tottori Prefectural Central Hospital		56 (182)	11	2018	35°31′19″N 134°12′43″E	
Toyama	Toyama	Tower 111		121 (395)	22	1994	36°42′11.8″N 137°12′58.3″E	
Wakayama	Wakayama	Wakayama Marina City Ciel Vita		102 (334)	28	2007		
Yamagata	Kaminoyama	Sky Tower 41		134 (439)	41	1999	38°08′18″N 140°16′55″E	
Yamaguchi	Shimonoseki	Vel Tower Shimonoseki		73 (238)	22	2007	33°56′59″N 130°55′32″E	
Yamanashi	Kōfu	Saints .25		94 (308)	25	2007	35°40′3.5″N 138°34′21″E	

== See also ==
- List of tallest buildings in Tokyo
- List of tallest buildings in Osaka
- List of tallest buildings in Nagoya
- List of tallest buildings in Japan

== Notes ==
- ^A G1 Tower rises to a height of 214 metres (700 ft) tall, making it the tallest structure in the prefecture.
- ^B Kyoto Tower rises to a height of 131 metres (430 ft) tall, making it the tallest structure in the prefecture.
- ^C A replica of the Dom Tower of Utrecht at the Huis Ten Bosch theme park rises to a height of 105 metres (344 ft) tall, making it the tallest structure in the prefecture.
- ^Y Tokyo Skytree rises to a height of 634 metres (2,080 ft) tall, making it the tallest structure in Japan.
- ^Z The building's roof antenna increases its total height of 106 metres (347 ft).
