= Sky Tower =

Sky Tower, SkyTower, Skytower, or Sky Towers may refer to:

== Buildings ==
=== In Asia ===
- Higashiyama Sky Tower, Nagoya, Japan
- Sky Tower (Abu Dhabi) in Abu Dhabi, UAE
- Sky Tower 41 in Kaminoyama, Japan
- Tiger Sky Tower (formerly Carlsberg Sky Tower) in Singapore
- Tuntex Sky Tower in Kaohsiung, Taiwan
- Tokyo Skytree, Sumida, Tokyo, Japan

=== In Europe ===
- The Seat of the European Central Bank in Frankfurt, Germany
- Sky Tower (Wrocław) in Wrocław, Poland
- Sky Towers (Cluj Napoca) in Romania
- Sky Towers (Kyiv) in Ukraine
- Sky Tower (București), part of the Floreasca City Center complex in Bucharest, Romania
- Sky Office Tower, Zagreb

=== In North America ===
- SeaWorld SkyTower, Orlando, Florida, USA
- Pinnacle One Yonge (under construction), Toronto, Ontario, Canada

=== In Oceania ===
- Brisbane Skytower in Brisbane, Australia
- Sky Tower (Auckland) in Auckland, New Zealand

== Engineering ==
- Space tower, a static support compression structure, a tower into space
- Space elevator, a static support tensile structure, a tower from space reaching towards the ground
- Space fountain, an active support structure, towering from the ground towards space

== Other ==
- Carolina Skytower, a ride at Carowinds amusement park, on the border of North and South Carolina, USA
- Skytower, Inc., a subsidiary of AeroVironment

== See also ==
- Space Tower, Spanish skyscraper
