= United Nations Plaza =

United Nations Plaza may refer to:

- United Nations Plaza (Bucharest), a building in Bucharest, Romania
- United Nations Plaza (San Francisco), a public plaza in the Civic Center area of San Francisco, California, U.S.
  - Civic Center/UN Plaza station, a transit station serving the site in San Francisco
- United Nations Plaza, location of the headquarters of the United Nations in New York City, New York, U.S.
