= Zaō Station =

Railway station in Yamagata, Japan

Zaō Station 蔵王駅
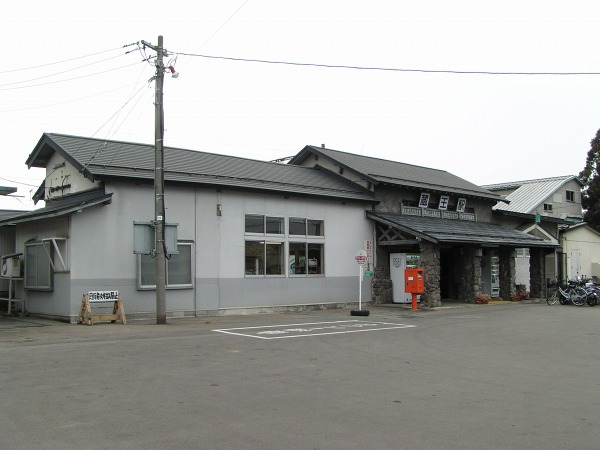
- Zaō Station in October 2005

General information
- Location: 387 Matsubara, Yamagata-shi, Yamagata-ken, 990-2313; Japan
- Coordinates: 38°12′22″N 140°18′13″E
- Operator: JR East
- Line: ■ Ōu Main Line
- Distance: 81.8 km from Fukushima
- Platforms: 2 side platforms

Other information
- Status: Staffed

History
- Opened: 5 December 1911
- Former names: Kanai (until 1951)

Passengers
- FY2018: 1105 daily

Services
Preceding station	JR East	Following station
Mokichi-Kinenkan-mae towards Fukushima	Yamagata Line	Yamagata towards Shinjō
Location
- Location within Yamagata Prefecture Location within Japan

Zaō Station (蔵王駅, Zaō-eki) is a railway station in the city of Yamagata, Yamagata Prefecture, Japan, operated by East Japan Railway Company (JR East).

== Lines ==
Zaō Station is served by the Ōu Main Line, and is located 81.8 rail kilometers from the terminus of the line at Fukushima Station.

== Station layout ==
Zaō Station has two opposed side platforms connected via a footbridge. The station is staffed.

=== Platforms ===
1	■ Ōu Main Line	for Kaminoyamaonsen, Akayu, and Yonezawa
2	■ Ōu Main Line	for Yamagata and Shinjō

== History ==
The station opened on 5 December 1911 as Kanai Station (金井駅). It was renamed Zaō Station on 1 March 1951. The station was absorbed into the JR East network upon the privatization of JNR on 1 April 1987.

== Passenger statistics ==
In fiscal 2018, the station was used by an average of 1105 passengers daily (boarding passengers only). The passenger figures for previous years are as shown below.

Fiscal year	Daily average
2000	760
2005	925
2010	902
2015	950

== Surrounding area ==
- National Route 13
- Tohoku Bunkyō College
- Tokai University Yamagata Senior High School

== See also ==
- List of railway stations in Japan
