= Nakagawa Station (Yamagata) =

Railway station in Nan'yō, Yamagata Prefecture, Japan

Nakagawa Station 中川駅
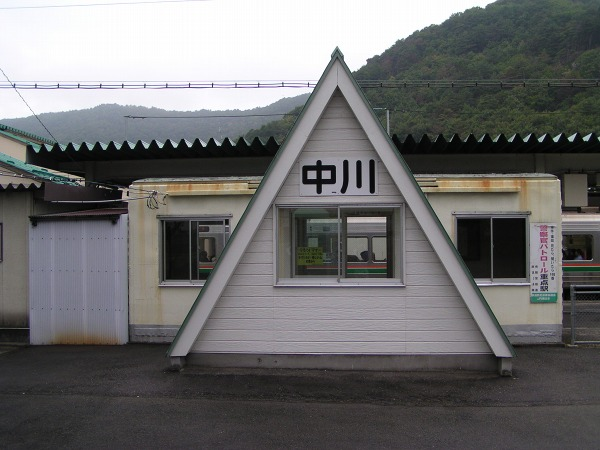
- Nakagawa Station in October 2005

General information
- Location: 255, Koiwasawa Aza Maeda, Nan'yō, Yamagata （山形県南陽市小岩沢字前田255） Japan
- Coordinates: 38°05′36″N 140°12′12″E
- Operator: JR East
- Line: Ōu Main Line
- Connections

History
- Opened: 1903

Services
Preceding station	JR East	Following station
Akayu towards Fukushima	Yamagata Line	Uzen-Nakayama towards Shinjō
Location

Nakagawa Station (中川駅, Nakagawa-eki) is a railway station on the Ōu Main Line in the city of Nanyō, Yamagata Prefecture, Japan, operated by East Japan Railway Company (JR East).

== Lines ==
Nakagawa Station is served by the Ōu Main Line, and is located 64.4 rail kilometers from the terminus of the line at Fukushima Station.

== Station layout ==
Nakagawa Station has two opposed side platforms connected via a pedestrian overpass; however, only one platform is in use. The station is unattended.

=== Platforms ===
1	■ Ōu Main Line	for Yonezawa and Akayu; Kaminoyamaonsen and Yamagata
2	■ Ōu Main Line	not in normal use

== History ==
Nakagawa Station opened on November 3, 1903. The station was absorbed into the JR East network upon the privatization of JNR on 1 April 1987.

== Surrounding area ==
- National Route 13
