= Gunma Prefectural Government Building =

Skyscraper in Maebashi, Gunma Prefecture, Japan

- 群馬県庁舎

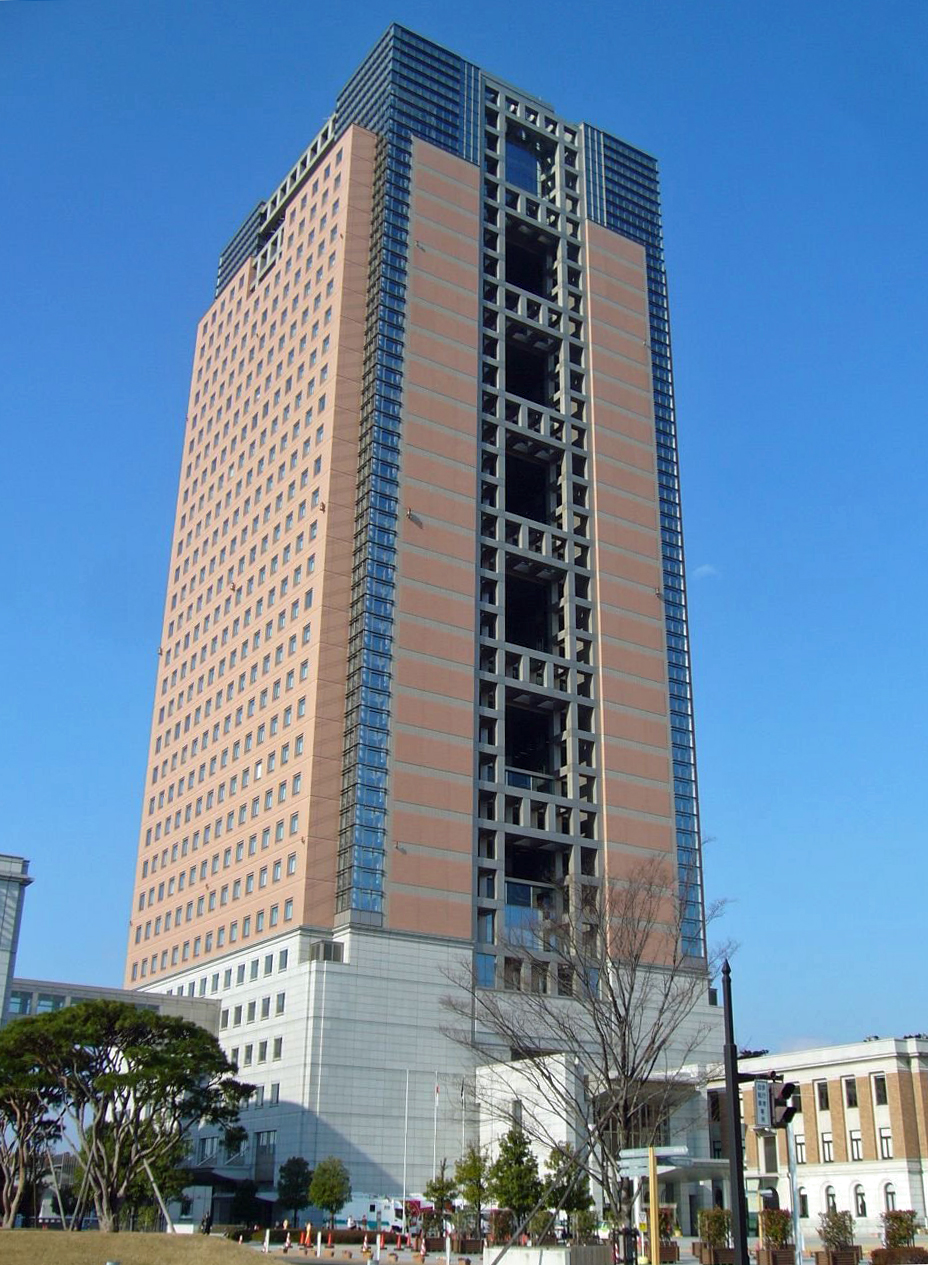
- Gunma Prefectural Government Building

General information
- Location: Maebashi, Gunma, Japan
- Coordinates: 36°23′28.5″N 139°03′39.5″E

Height
- Height: 153.80 m (504.6 ft)

Technical details
- Floor count: 33 above, 3 below ground
- Floor area: 3,227 m²
- Grounds: 83,503 m²

Design and construction
- Architecture firm: AXS Satow Inc

The Gunma Prefectural Government Building (群馬県庁舎, Gunma-ken Shōsha) is a skyscraper located in Maebashi, Gunma Prefecture, Japan. Construction of the 154-metre, 33-storey skyscraper was finished in 1999. It is the tallest building in Gunma Prefecture.
