= Toru Oba =

American sculptor

- Oba beside his sculpture "Infinity Portal" (2023)
- Born: 大場徹 (Ōba Tōru); 1945 (age 80–81); Minazawa, Yamagata, Japan
- Occupations: Stonemason, stone sculptor
- Years active: 1969 – present

Toru Oba (Japanese: 大場徹, romanized: Ōba Tōru; born 1945) is an American stonemason and stone sculptor. He is an instructor of stone masonry and creator of landscape features and several sculptures.

== Early life and education ==
Oba was born in 1945 in Minazawa (later merged into Kaminoyama), Yamagata Prefecture, Japan. He was born into a family of traditional landowners and artists, and grew up in the mountains of rural Yamagata. He completed his early schooling in Yamagata and later finished his education in Tokyo.

In 1969, Oba moved to La Roque-sur-Cèze, France. He apprenticed with French stonemasons working on the 11th century stone village. He lived in France with his wife and daughter until 1972. Then he moved to rural West Virginia, United States, where he created Japanese style gardens, Russian, Finnish and Rumford style fireplaces.

== Career ==
In 1984, Oba became an instructor of a stone masonry workshop at the Lama Foundation in Taos, New Mexico. Oba subsequently became a founding member of the Stone Foundation, based in Santa Fe, New Mexico.

In 1985, Oba moved with his wife and two daughters to central Virginia. His work evolved towards landscape features and monumental sculptural structures such as Japanese style lakes, waterfalls, massive sculpted stone benches, tables, and freestanding contemporary sculpture. Stonemason Charles McRaven remarked that "Toru's stone work is always art". Writer Aaron Steinberg says that Oba's style of "rough surfaces juxtaposed against smooth ones, wide-open spaces, and nature-like arrangements– betrays a very Japanese aesthetic." Starting in 1999, he worked several years on musician LeRoi Moore's house, saying "It was the best job I ever had".

=== Works ===
Oba has six sculptures displayed in downtown Charlottesville, Virginia at the McGuffey Art Center. Oba's work is on display at the Brad Smith Gallery in Santa Fe, New Mexico. In 2017, Purdue University installed a fountain created by Oba named "Baransu (Balance) Fountain" at the de Bedout Piazza. In 2023, he dedicated a large soapstone sculpture titled "Infinity Portal" at the Buckingham County Public Library in Virginia.
