= Mokichi-Kinenkan-mae Station =

Railway station in Kaminoyama, Yamagata Prefecture, Japan

Mokichi-Kinenkan-mae Station 茂吉記念館前駅
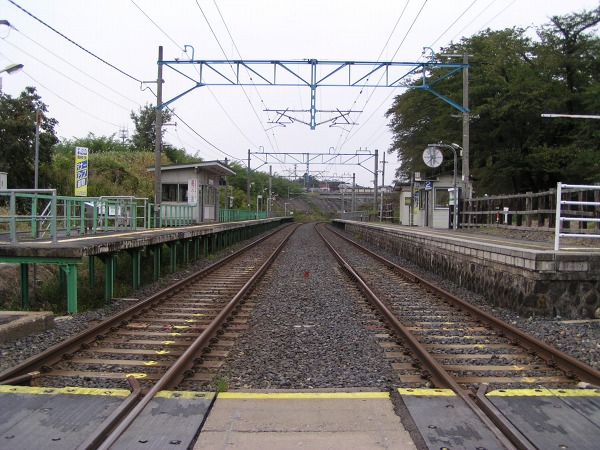
- Mokichi-Kinenkan-mae Station, October 2005

General information
- Location: Benten-1421 Kitamachi, Kaminoyama-shi, Yamagata-ken 999-3131; Japan
- Coordinates: 38°10′16″N 140°17′53″E
- Operator: JR East
- Line: ■ Ōu Main Line
- Distance: 77.8 km from Fukushima
- Platforms: 2 side platforms

Other information
- Status: Unstaffed
- Website: Official website

History
- Opened: 5 December 1952
- Former names: Kitakaminoyama (until 1992)

Services
| Preceding station | JR East | Following station |
|---|---|---|
| Kaminoyama-Onsen towards Fukushima | Yamagata Line | Zaō towards Shinjō |
Location
- Location within Yamagata Prefecture Location within Japan

Mokichi-Kinenkan-mae Station (茂吉記念館前駅, Mokichikinenkanmae-eki) is a railway station in the city of Kaminoyama, Yamagata Prefecture, Japan, operated by East Japan Railway Company (JR East). It takes its name after the Mokichi Saitō Memorial Museum.

== Lines ==
Mokichi-Kinenkan-mae Station is served by the Ōu Main Line, and is located 77.8 rail kilometers from the terminus of the line at Fukushima Station.

== Station layout ==
The station has two opposed side platforms connected via a level crossing. The station is unattended.

=== Platforms ===
| 1 | ■ Ōu Main Line | for Yamagata and Shinjō |
| 2 | ■ Ōu Main Line | for Kaminoyamaonsen, Akayu, and Yonezawa |

== History ==
The station opened on 5 December 1952 as Kita-Kaminoyama Station (北上ノ山駅, Kita kaminoyama eki). The station was absorbed into the JR East network upon the privatization of JNR on 1 April 1987. It was renamed to its present name on 1 July 1992.

== Surrounding area ==
The surrounding area is of rice paddies and small rural communities.
