= Gifu Broadcasting System =

Radio and television station in Gifu Prefecture, Japan

Gifu Broadcasting System, Inc.
- Logo used since 2007

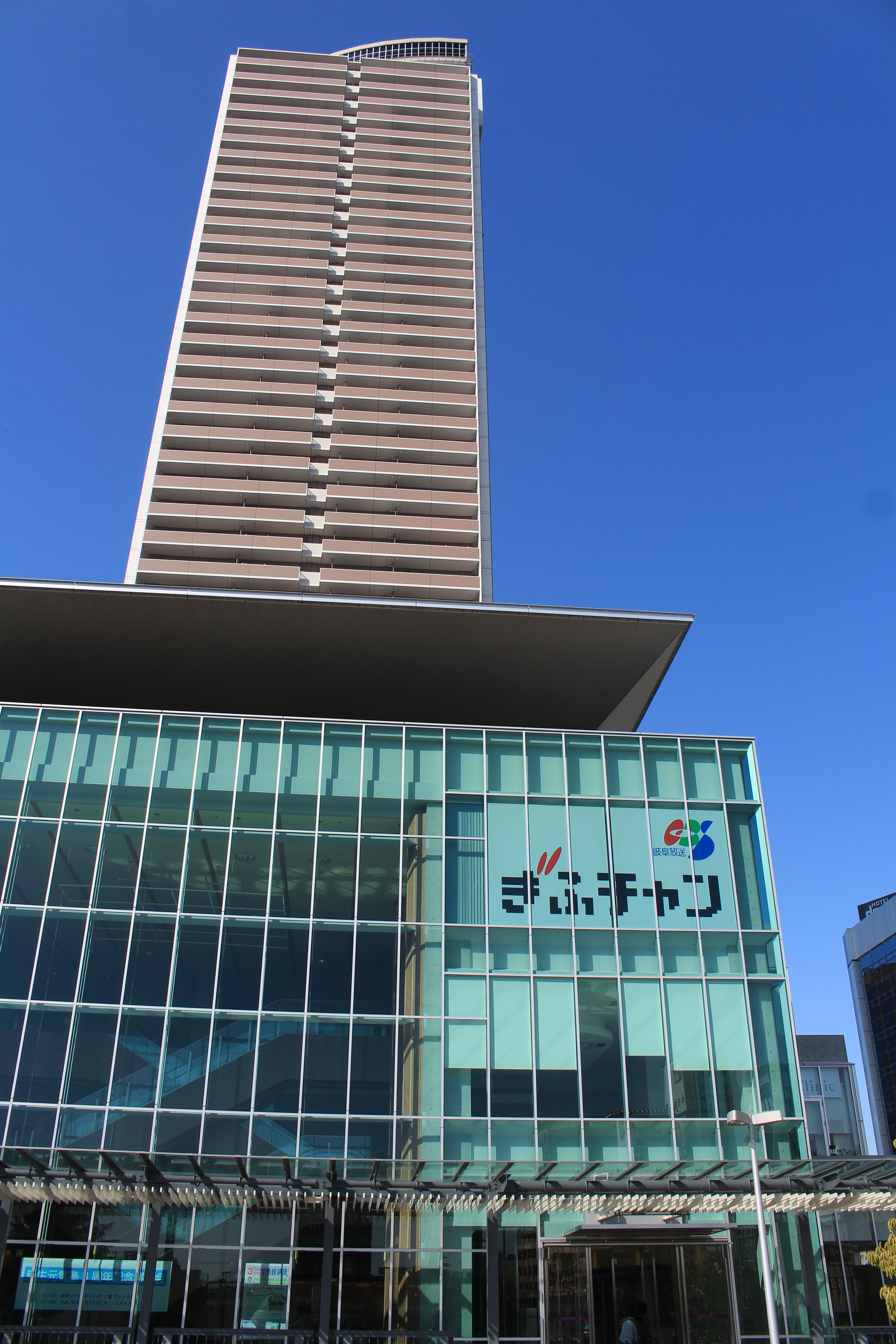
- Headquarters in Hashimoto, Gifu
- Trade name: GBS
- Native name: 岐阜放送株式会社
- Romanized name: Gifu Hōsō Kabushiki-gaisha
- Type: Private KK
- Industry: Media
- Founded: September 7, 1962; 64 years ago
- Headquarters: Hashimoto, Gifu City, Gifu Prefecture, Japan
- Key people: Ko Yamamoto (president and CEO)
- Services: Radio and television network
- Website: www.zf-web.com

JOZF
- Gifu; Japan
- Broadcast area: Gifu Prefecture
- Frequencies: 1431 kHz (AM); 90.4 MHz (FM)
- Branding: Gifu Chan Radio

Programming
- Language: Japanese
- Format: Talk/Sports
- Affiliations: Independent

Ownership
- Owner: Gifu Broadcasting System, Inc.

History
- First air date: December 24, 1962; 63 years ago

Technical information
- Licensing authority: MIC
- Power: 5 kW

JOZF-DTV
- Gifu Prefecture; Japan
- City: Gifu
- Channels: Digital: 30 (UHF); Virtual: 8
- Branding: Gifu Chan

Programming
- Language: Japanese
- Affiliations: Independent (member of JAITS)

Ownership
- Owner: Gifu Broadcasting System, Inc.

History
- First air date: August 12, 1968; 58 years ago
- Former call signs: JOZF-TV (1968-2011)
- Former channel numbers: 37 (analog, UHF, 1968-2011)

Technical information
- Licensing authority: MIC

Gifu Broadcasting System (岐阜放送株式会社, Gifu Hōsō Kabushiki-gaisha; GBS) is a regional radio and television service serving Gifu Prefecture, Japan. Its radio service is an independent AM station, and its television service is a member of JAITS. The station is branded as Gifu Chan (ぎふチャン).

== Capital composition ==
As of March 31, 2021:

Capital	Value per share	Total number of shares issued	Number of shareholders
3,000,000,000 yen	5000 yen	600,000 shares	100

Shareholder	Number of Shares	Percentage
Gifu Shimbun	284,460 shares	47.41%
Gifu Prefecture Government	102,000 shares	17.00%
16th Bank	24,400 shares	4.06%
Ogaki Kyoritsu Bank	12,800 shares	2.13%
Chunichi Shimbun	12,000 shares	2.00%
Gifu City	10,926 shares	1.82%
Gifu Bank	10,000 shares	1.66%

== History ==
Gifu Radio decided to apply for a television broadcast license the year after it started broadcasting. It initially planned to obtain a broadcast license for VHF channel 7. On August 23, 1963, Gifu Radio submitted an application to open a UHF TV channel. However, this idea did not become a reality until 1965, when the Postal Ministry agreed to open the UHF band for television broadcasting. On October 2, 1967, the Postal Ministry issued the first UHF television frequency allocation plan, with Gifu being one of the first 18 regions to obtain UHF frequencies. At that time, in addition to Gifu Radio, two other companies in Gifu Prefecture applied for television broadcasting licenses. Later, with the mediation of Saburo Hirano, the then governor of Gifu Prefecture, the three companies agreed to integrate the application. Gifu Broadcasting also increased its capital in order to prepare for broadcasting.

At 9:00 on July 20, 1968, Gifu Broadcasting began test television broadcasts. At 8:50 on August 12 of the same year, Gifu Broadcasting officially started broadcasting its television station. The first program broadcast was Gifu Nichinichi Shimbun News. Gifu Broadcasting thus became Japan's first commercial UHF television station. Gifu Broadcasting purchased a piece of land adjacent to the Gifu Nichibana News Agency in Imakomachi, Gifu City in 1977, and started building a new headquarters on November 1, 1979. On September 30 of the following year, Gifu Broadcasting's new headquarters was completed. On October 1, Gifu Broadcasting began broadcasting programs from the new headquarters.

Starting in 1992, Gifu Broadcasting Television has implemented full-day broadcasting from 9 a.m. Gifu Broadcasting began broadcasting digital TV on April 1, 2005, and the remote control number was changed to channel 8. At the repeated invitation of the Gifu City Government, Gifu Broadcasting moved to Gifu City Tower 43 in front of Gifu Station in 2007, and began broadcasting programs from City Tower 43 on November 11 of the same year. On July 24, 2011, Gifu Broadcasting stopped broadcasting analog TV signals. Gifu Broadcasting celebrated its 50th anniversary in 2012. As part of the commemoration of the 50th anniversary of the broadcast, Gifu Broadcasting held the Marc Chagall exhibition at the Gifu Prefectural Museum of Art. In June 2020, Gifu Broadcasting opened the news website "Gifu Chan DIGITAL" to provide information all over Japan, Introducing news from Gifu Prefecture.

== Programming ==
When Gifu Broadcasting started broadcasting radio programs, it broadcast 18 hours of programs every day from 6 a.m., broadcasting eleven 10-minute news bulletins each day, and its own programs made up 10 hours a day. In September 1997, Gifu Broadcasting began broadcasting its first nightly information program "LoveLove Wide Gifu TODAY", which was broadcast for 8 years. Currently, Gifu Broadcasting's main evening news program is "Gifu Sate!", which has been broadcast since 2019 and is broadcast for 10 minutes every Monday to Friday at 18:15.
