= Uzen-Nakayama Station =

Railway station in Kaminoyama, Yamagata Prefecture, Japan

Uzen-Nakayama Station 羽前中山駅
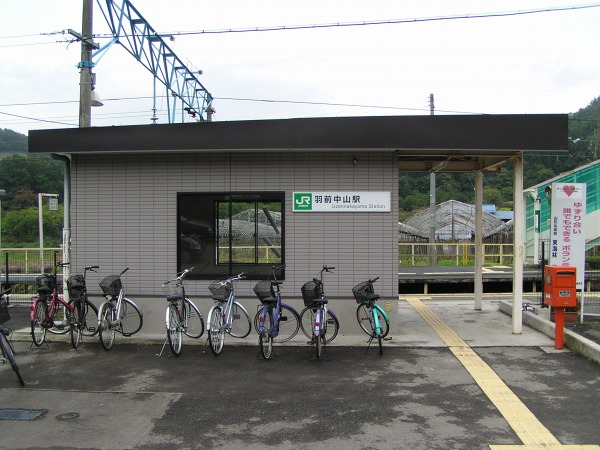
- Uzen-Nakayama Station in August 2005

General information
- Location: 3590, Nakayama, Kaminoyama-shi, Yamagata-ken 999-3246; Japan
- Coordinates: 38°07′28″N 140°13′06″E
- Operator: JR East
- Line: ■ Ōu Main Line
- Distance: 68.3 km from Fukushima
- Platforms: 2 side platforms

Other information
- Status: Unstaffed
- Website: Official website

History
- Opened: 15 November 1952

Services
Preceding station	JR East	Following station
Nakagawa towards Fukushima	Yamagata Line	Kaminoyama-Onsen towards Shinjō
Location
- Location within Yamagata Prefecture Location within Japan

Uzen-Nakayama Station (羽前中山駅, Uzen-Nakayama-eki) is a railway station in the city of Kaminoyama, Yamagata Prefecture, Japan, operated by East Japan Railway Company (JR East).

== Lines ==
Uzen-Nakayama Station is served by the Ōu Main Line, and is located 68.3 rail kilometers from the terminus of the line at Fukushima Station.

== Station layout ==
The station has two opposed side platforms connected via a footbridge. The station is unattended.

=== Platforms ===
1	■ Ōu Main Line	for Kaminoyamaonsen and Yamagata
2	■ Ōu Main Line	for Yonezawa and Akayu

== History ==
Uzen-Nakayama Station opened on 15 November 1952. The station was absorbed into the JR East network upon the privatization of JNR on 1 April 1987. It was renamed to its present name on 1 July 1992. A new station building was completed in 2001.

== Surrounding area ==
- National Route 13
