= Porte Kanazawa =

Skyscraper in Kanazawa

Coordinates: 36°34′34.7″N 136°38′57.5″E

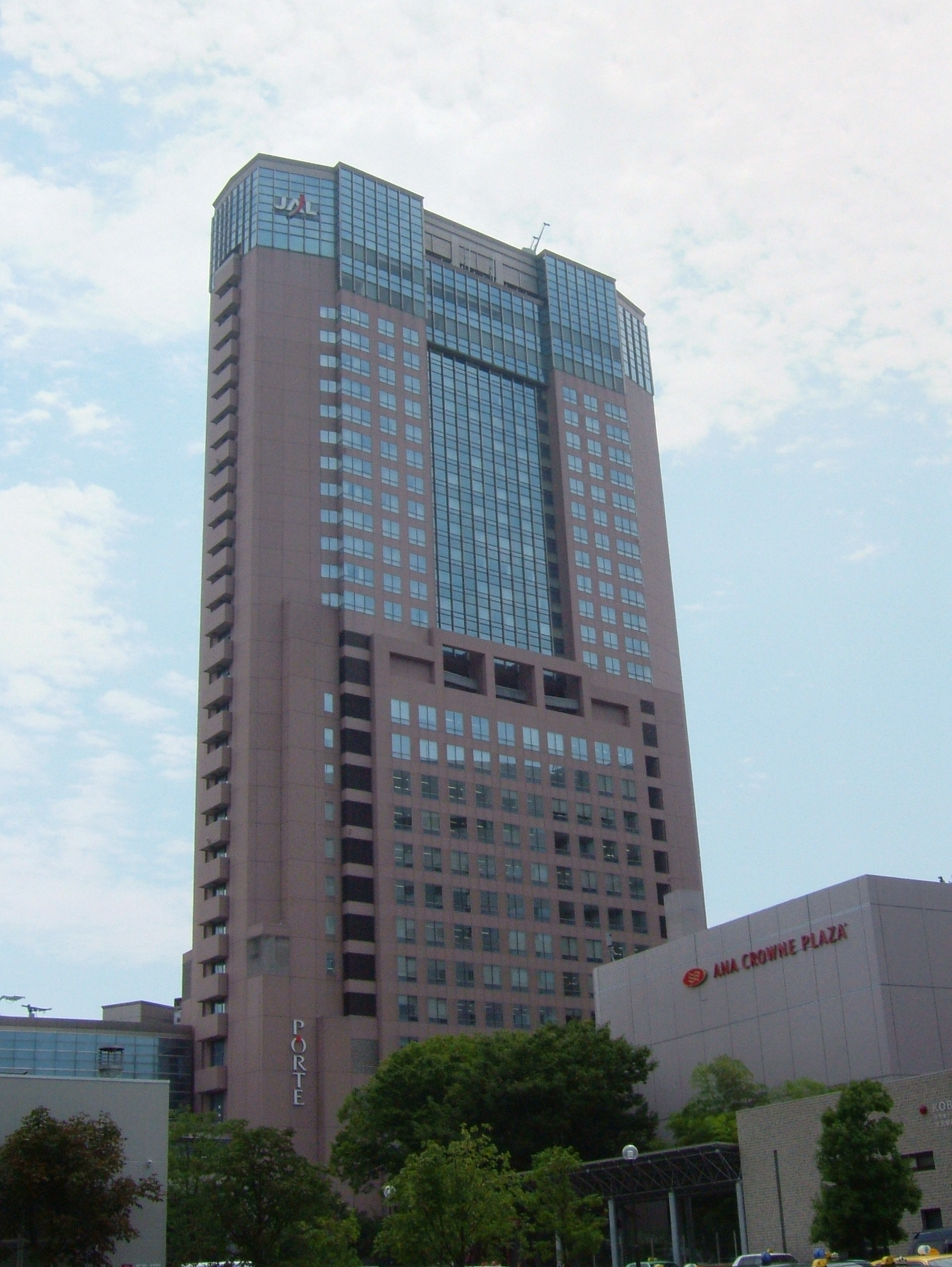
Porte Kanazawa

The Porte Kanazawa (ポルテ金沢, Porute Kanazawa) is a skyscraper located in Kanazawa, Isikawa Prefecture, Japan.

Construction of the 131-metre, 30-story skyscraper was finished in 1994. It has 2 active mass damper (AMD) control systems to stabilize the structure during earthquakes and strong winds in the area.
