= Belle Demeure Landmark AKITA =

Skyscraper in Akita City, Akita, Japan

Coordinates: 39°43′4.5″N 140°7′8.1″E

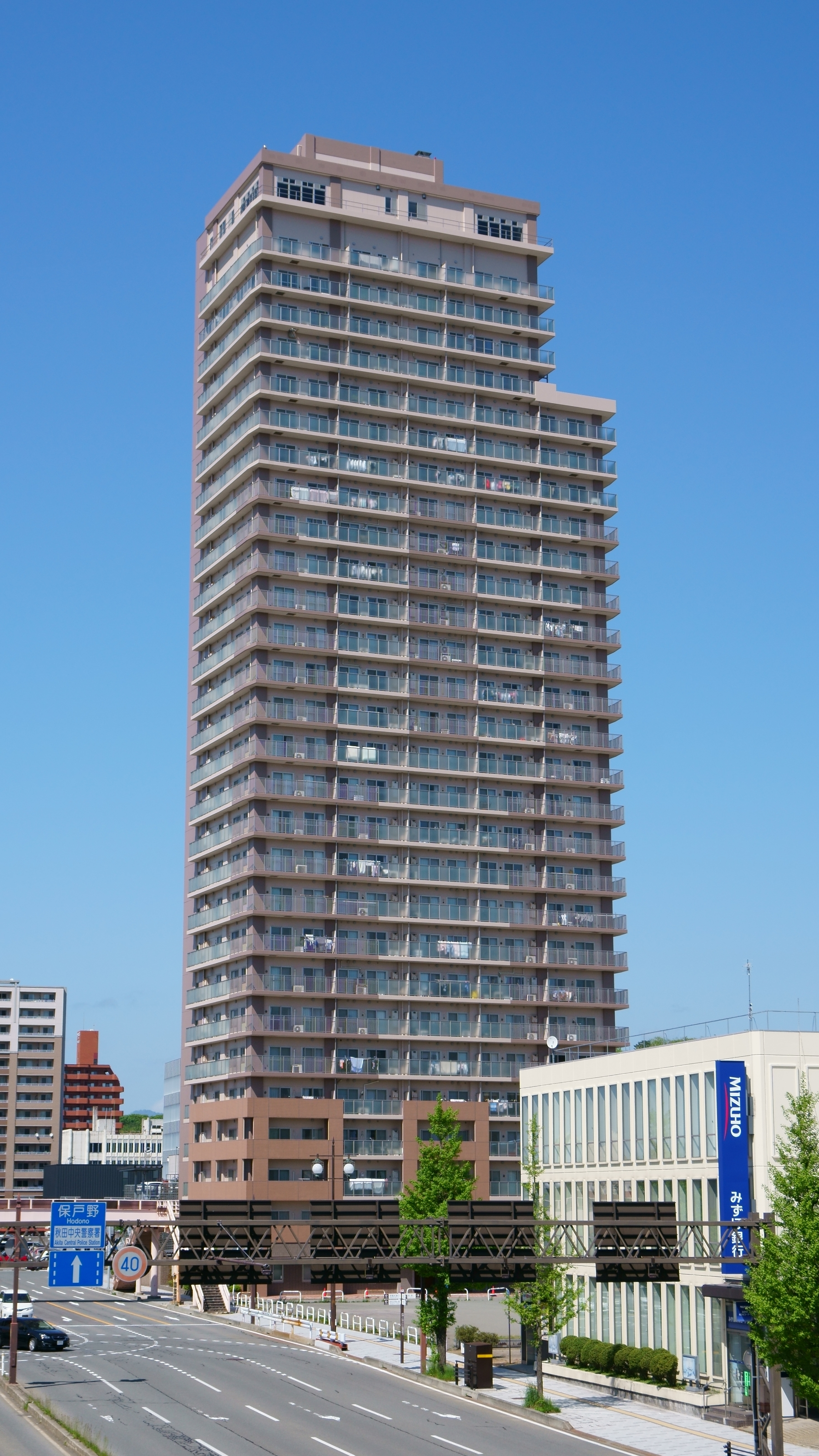
Belle Demeure Landmark AKITA

The Belle Demeure Landmark AKITA (ベルドゥムール ランドマーク秋田, Beru Dumāru Randomāku Akita) is a skyscraper located in Akita City, Akita, Japan. Construction of the 95-metre, 30-storey skyscraper was finished in 2003. There was a Kyodosha department store in this place.

== Location map ==
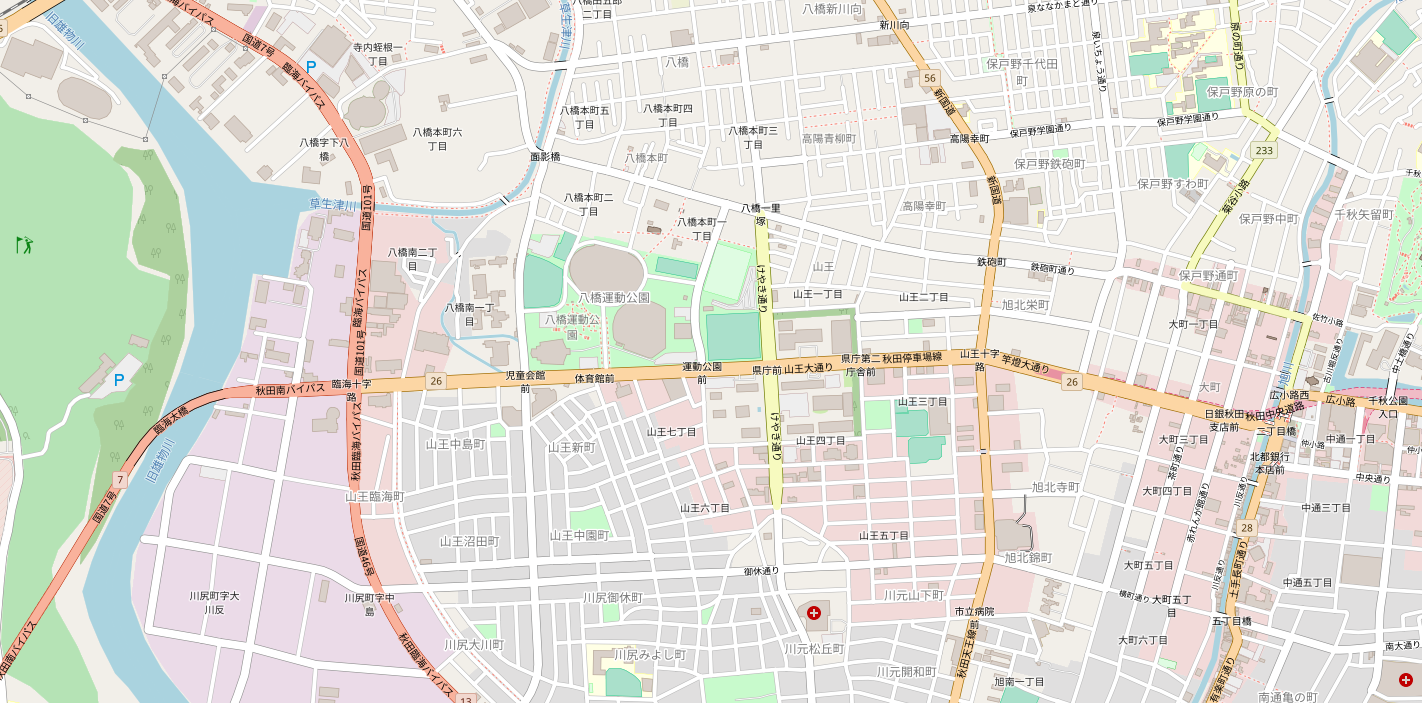
