= Gifu City Tower 43 =

Multipurpose skyscraper in Japan

Coordinates: 35°24′38.5″N 136°45′16.2″E

- 岐阜シティ・タワー43
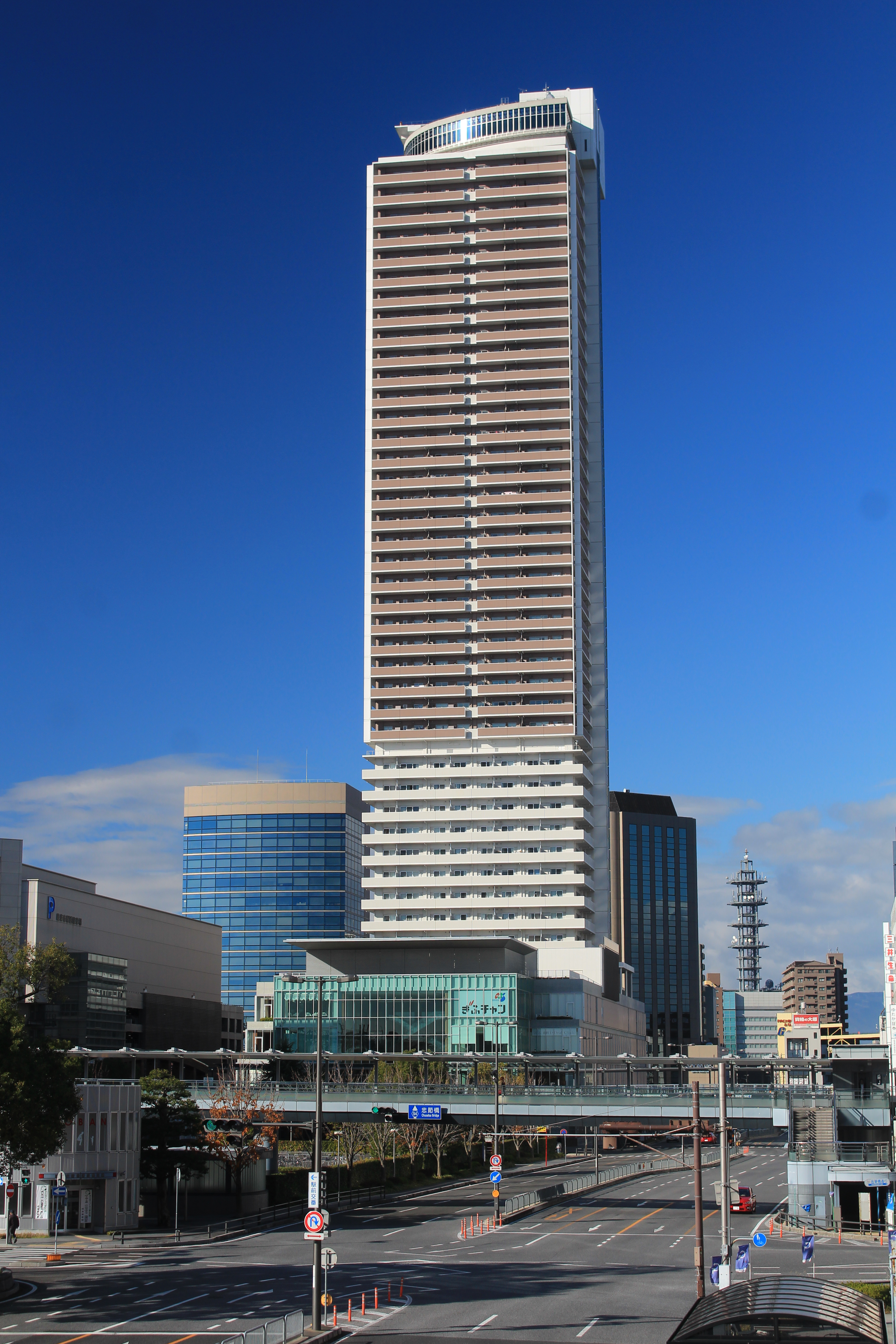
- Gifu Tower 43

General information
- Type: Mixed-use
- Location: 2-52 Hashimoto-chō, Gifu, Gifu Prefecture, Japan
- Construction started: 2005
- Completed: 2007

Height
- Roof: 162.82 m (534 ft)

Technical details
- Floor count: 43 and one basement level
- Floor area: 57,600.44 m^{2} (620,006.0 sq ft)
- Lifts/elevators: 13

Design and construction
- Architects: Mori Building Co., Ltd. & Takenaka Co.
- Main contractor: Mori Building Co., Ltd. & Takenaka Co.

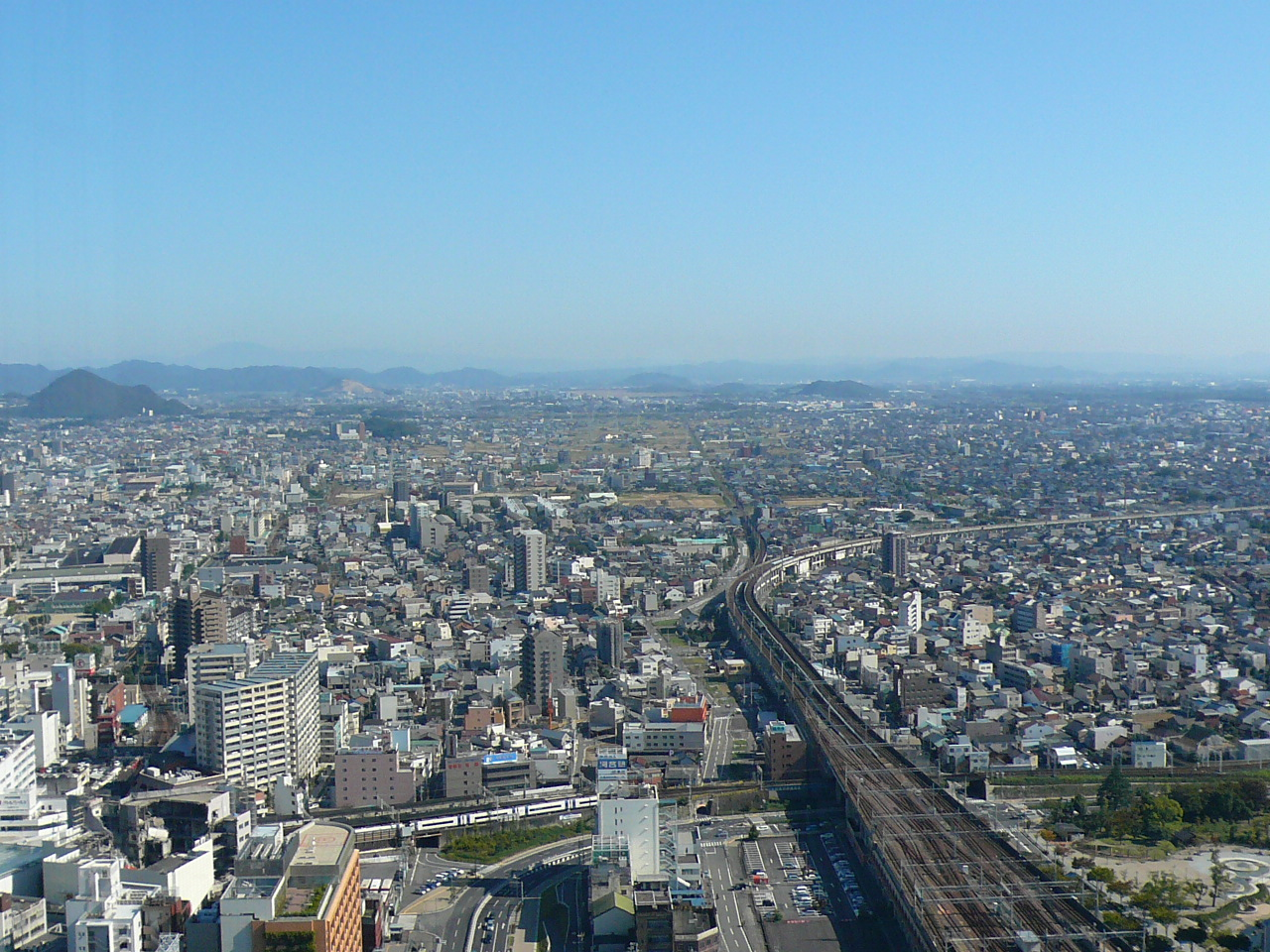
The view to the east from the observatory

Gifu City Tower 43 (岐阜シティ・タワー43) is a multipurpose skyscraper built in the Hashimoto-chō section in the capital city of Gifu, Gifu Prefecture, Japan. Officially opened on October 13, 2007, Gifu City Tower 43 is the tallest building in Gifu Prefecture, with its 43 above-ground floors reaching to a height of 163 m (535 ft). It is located just to the north and west of JR Gifu Station.

== Building details ==
The construction of Gifu City Tower 43 was planned by the Gifu Station West Area Urban Redevelopment Group, with planning beginning in 1983. The cost of the project was approximately 15 billion yen (US$130 million), with construction officially beginning on January 8, 2005. The property on which it has an area of about 11,000 square metres. The building itself has a footprint of 5,412.12 m², with floorspace totalling 57,600.44 m². Gifu City Tower 43 is composed mostly of reinforced concrete. On the roof of the building, there is a damper, which was designed to reduce vibrations resulting from earthquakes by 20%.

== Design concept ==
When the tower was being designed and built, four concepts were implemented that would represent traditional and cultural aspects of Gifu City. The first concept was to use the observatory to correlate to Gifu Castle, home to Saitō Dōsan and Oda Nobunaga, both of whom made Gifu famous throughout the country. The second concept brings Gifu Lanterns into the design, using traditional designs of the lanterns on the outer walls to make the tower blend with the surrounding area. The third design brings in Gifu's former name, Inokuchi (井口), by creating lines down the each side of the building so, when it is viewed from above, it represents the character 井, which is also the city symbol. The fourth concept uses designs of cormorant fishing boats throughout the floors to blend traditional and modern design elements.

== Floor guide ==
- 43rd floor: Sky Lounge

The Sky Lounge is owned and operated by the city of Gifu. In the Sky Lounge, there is both an observatory, from which the surrounding area can be seen, and Zetton, a restaurant which also has wide views of the city. The observatory offers views of the surrounding area, while the restaurant only has views of the south and west. There is a free elevator from the first floor which services only the observation deck. It can bring visitors from the first and second floors to the top floor in approximately 45 seconds.

- 15th to 42nd floor: Private condominiums

There are 243 private condominiums, with a total floor area of 18,490m², in Gifu City Tower 43. They are divided up as follows:

40th to 42nd floor: 15 Executive Stage condominiums, ranging from 110m² 2LDKs to 150m² 4LDKs.
29th to 39th floor: 88 Premium Stage condominiums, ranging from 50m² 2LDKs to 80m² 3LDKs.
15th to 28th floor: 140 Superior Stage condominiums, ranging from 70m² 2LDKs to 100m² 4LDKs.

- 6th to 14th floor: La Sur Maison

There are 108 separate residences for senior citizens, with a total floor space of 5,330m². These units are run by the Gifu Prefectural Housing Corporation.

- 5th floor: Entrance to condominiums
- 4th floor: Gifu Broadcasting System, Inc. and other commercial establishments

Gifu Broadcasting System, Inc. (broadcasts began on November 11, 2007) and commercial establishments

- 3rd floor: Medical and welfare facilities
- 1st and 2nd floor: Commercial establishments
- Underground level: Parking

There are 56 parking spaces available beneath Gifu City Tower 43 for public use and shares an entrance with the west parking garage for JR Gifu Station. Next to the building is another parking garage with 192 spaces available for residents of the Tower.
