= Kaminoyama =

Kaminoyama 上山市
- City
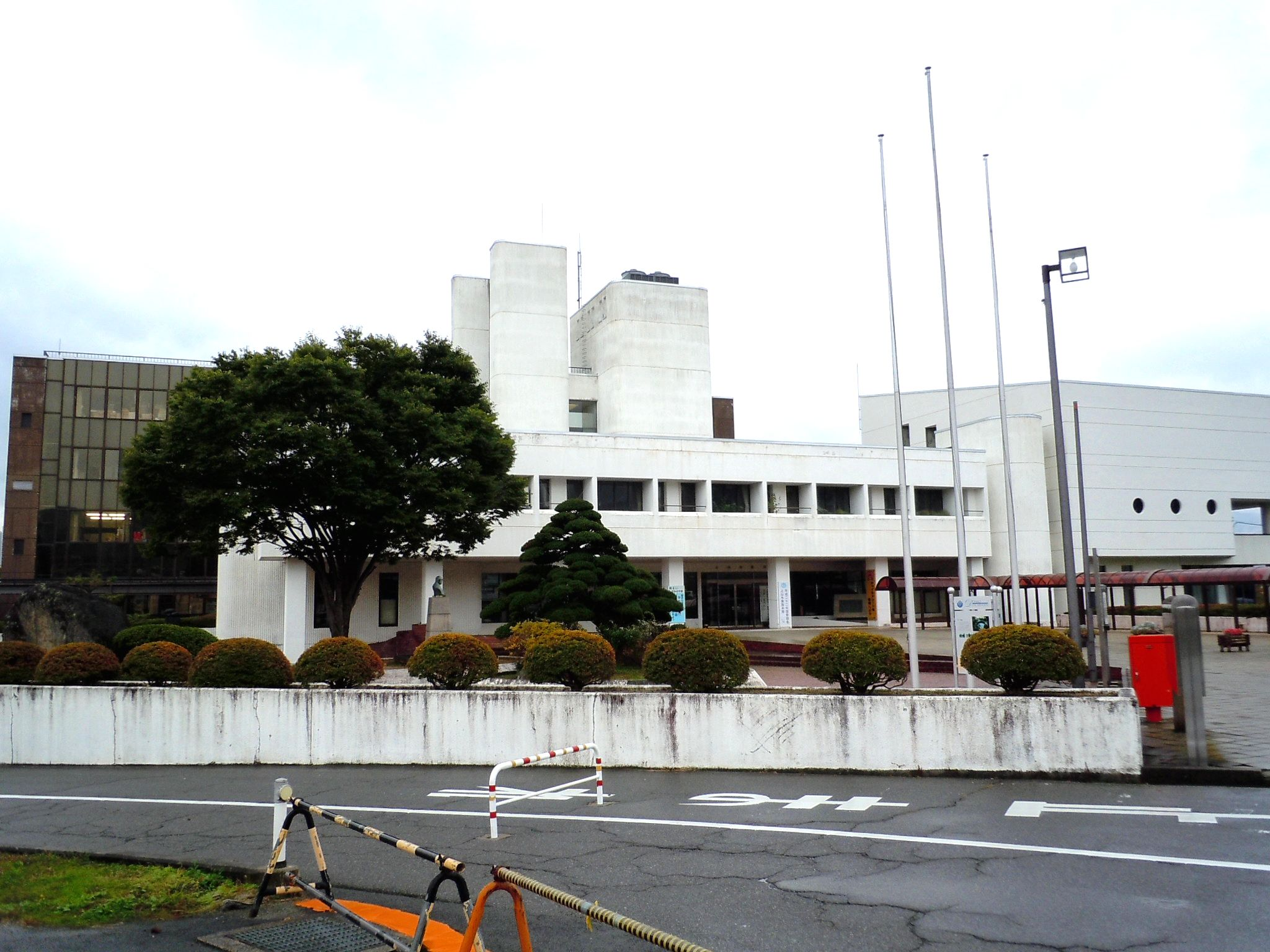
- Kaminoyama City Hall

- Flag Seal

- Location of Kaminoyama in Yamagata Prefecture

- Coordinates: 38°8′58.5″N 140°16′4.3″E
- Country: Japan
- Region: Tōhoku
- Prefecture: Yamagata

Area
  - Total: 240.93 km^{2} (93.02 sq mi)

Population (February 2015)
  - Total: 29,974
  - Density: 124.41/km^{2} (322.22/sq mi)
- Time zone: UTC+9 (Japan Standard Time)
- City symbols
- Tree: Japanese yew
- Flower: Chrysanthemum
- Bird: Little egret
- Phone number: 023-672-1111
- Address: 1-1-10 Kawasaki, Kaminoyama-shi, Yamagata-ken 999-3192
- Website: Official website

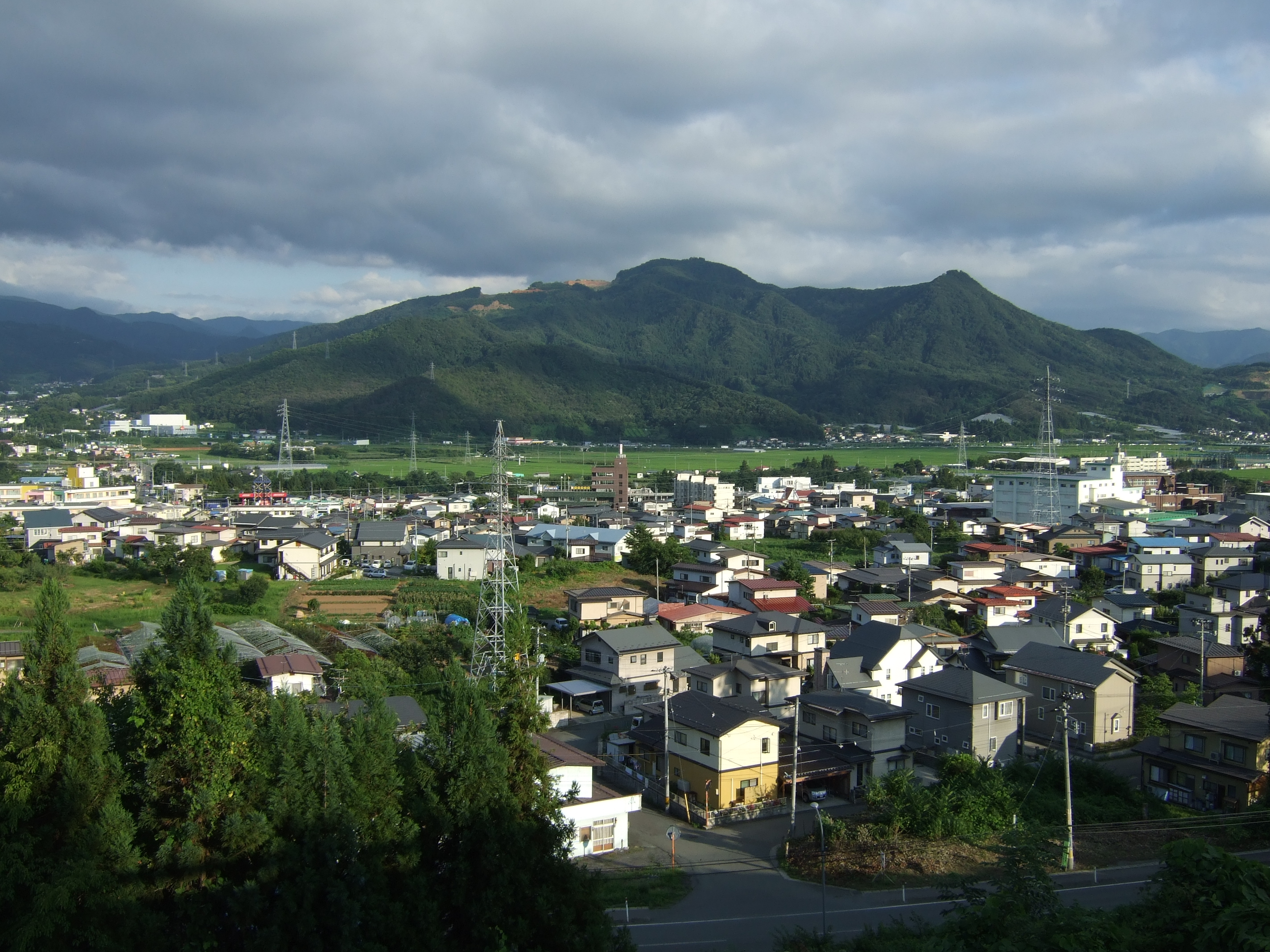
Hayama neighborhood in Kaminoyama

Kaminoyama (上山市, Kaminoyama-shi) is a city located in Yamagata Prefecture, Japan. As of 31 October 2020, the city had an estimated population of 29,617 in 11278 households, and a population density of 120 persons per km^{2}. The total area of the city is 240.93 square kilometres (93 sq mi).

== Geography ==
Kaminoyama is located in southeast Yamagata Prefecture, in the Murayama Basin, bordered by Miyagi Prefecture to the east. Mount Zaō is located within its borders.

=== Neighboring municipalities ===
- Miyagi Prefecture
  - Kawasaki
  - Shichikashuku
- Yamagata Prefecture
  - Nanyo
  - Takahata
  - Yamagata

=== Climate ===
Kaminoyama has a humid continental climate (Köppen climate classification Cfa) with large seasonal temperature differences, with warm to hot (and often humid) summers and cold (sometimes severely cold) winters. This includes heavy amounts of snowfall from late November until early March. Precipitation is significant throughout the year, but is heaviest from August to October. The average annual temperature in Kaminoyama is 11.4 °C. The average annual rainfall is 1362 mm with September as the wettest month. The temperatures are highest on average in August, at around 24.9 °C, and lowest in January, at around -1.1 °C.

== Demographics ==
Per Japanese census data, the population of Kaminoyama has declined over the past 40 years.

Historical population
Year	Pop.	±%
1960	40,383	—
1970	38,357	−5.0%
1980	38,533	+0.5%
1990	38,327	−0.5%
2000	36,886	−3.8%
2010	33,836	−8.3%
2020	29,110	−14.0%

== History ==
The area of present-day Kaminoyama was part of ancient Dewa Province, and was a castle town for Kaminoyama Domain under the Tokugawa shogunate in the Edo period. It was also a post station on the Ushū Kaidō highway. After the start of the Meiji period, the area became part of Minamimurayama District, Yamagata Prefecture. The town of Kaminoyama was established on April 1, 1889 with the establishment of the modern municipalities system, and was elevated to city status on October 1, 1954.

== Government ==
Kaminoyama has a mayor-council form of government with a directly elected mayor and a unicameral city legislature of 15 members. The city contributes one member to the Yamagata Prefectural Assembly. In terms of national politics, the city is part of Yamagata District 1 of the lower house of the Diet of Japan.

== Economy ==
The economy of Kaminoyama is based on agriculture (horticulture), light manufacturing (electronics, automotive components, clothing, foodstuffs), forestry and tourism. This region is famous for its hot spring water and hot spring resorts near the former grounds of Kaminoyama Castle

== Education ==
Kaminoyama has five public elementary schools and three public middle schools operated by the city government and one public high schools operated by the Yamagata Prefectural Board of Education. The prefecture also operates one special education school for the handicapped and two vocational training schools.

== Transportation ==
=== Railway ===
East Japan Railway Company - Yamagata Shinkansen

- Kaminoyama Onsen

East Japan Railway Company - Ōu Main Line

- Kaminoyama Onsen - Uzen-Nakayama - Mokichi Kinenkan-mae

=== Highways ===
- Tōhoku-Chūō Expressway – Yamagata-Kamiyama Interchange, Kaminoyama-Minami Interchange
- National Route 13
- National Route 458

== Local attractions ==
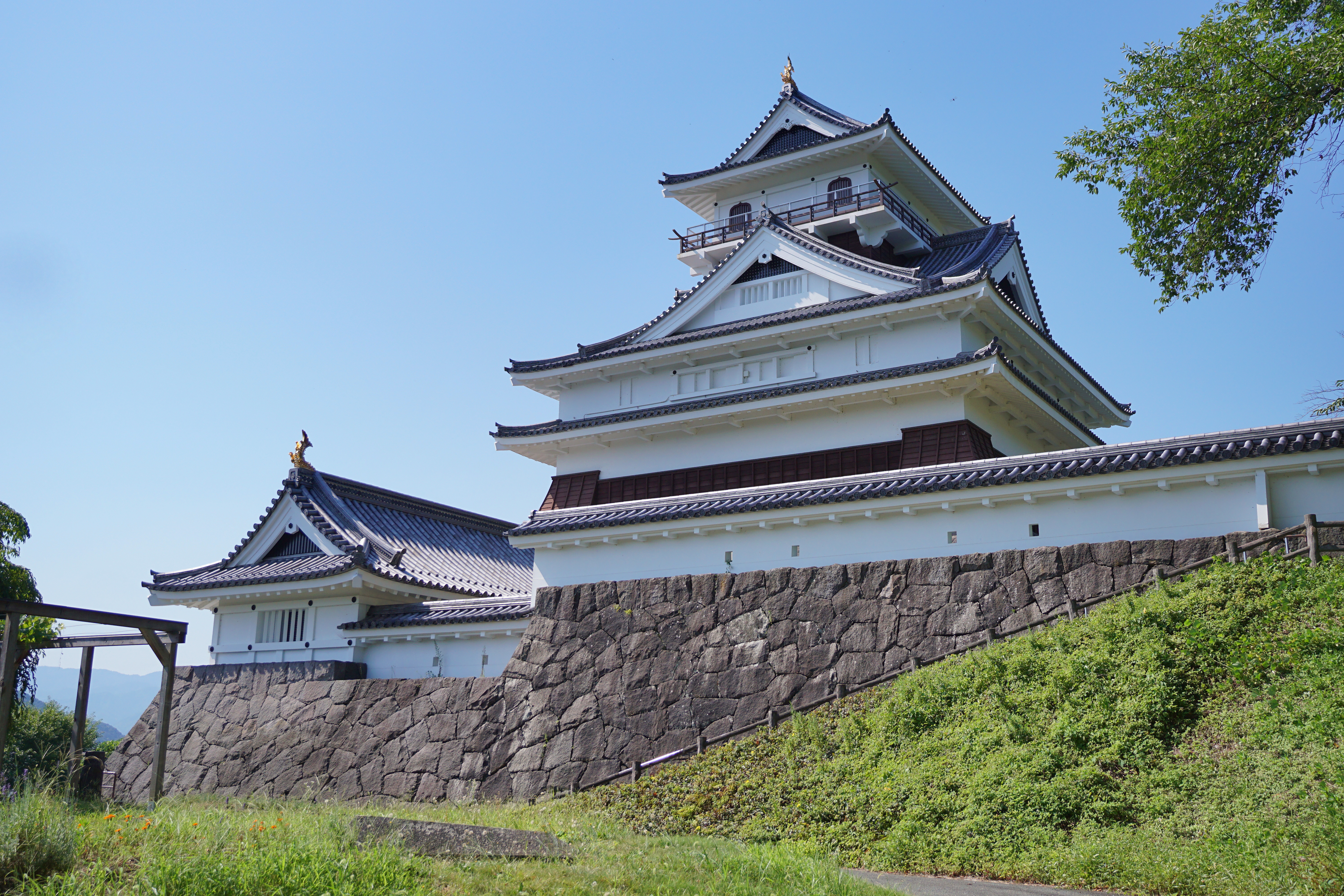
Kaminoyama Castle

- Kaminoyama Castle
- Kaminoyama Onsen
- Saito Mokichi Memorial Museum
- Sky Tower 41

== International relations ==
=== Sister cities ===
- Donaueschingen, Baden-Württemberg, Germany, since October 1, 1995.

== Notable people from Kaminoyama ==
- Masaru Akiba, professional soccer player
- Toshiaki Endo, politician
- Takeshi Koike, anime movie director, illustrator
- Mokichi Saitō, poet
- Toru Oba, stonemason
