= Tower 111 =

Skyscraper in Japan

- タワー111
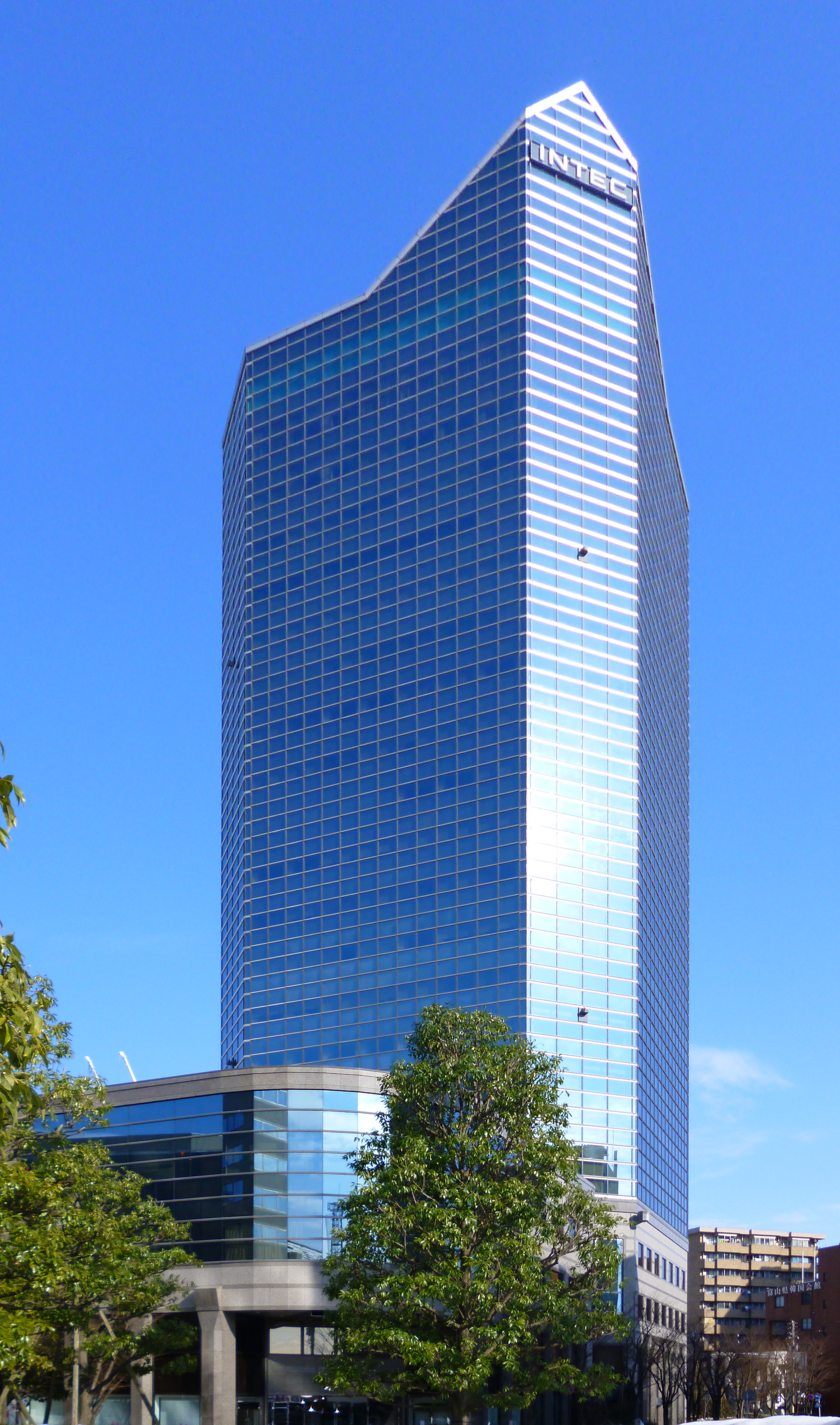

General information
- Status: Completed
- Location: 5-5 Ushijima-Shinmachi; Toyama, Toyama, Japan
- Coordinates: 36°42′12″N 137°12′58″E
- Completed: 1994
- Owner: Intec Amenity Inc.

Height
- Antenna spire: 120.5 meters (395 ft)
- Roof: 111 meters (364 ft)

Technical details
- Floor count: 22 above ground 1 below ground
- Floor area: 35,745 m^{2} (384,800 sq ft)

Design and construction
- Architect: Mitsubishi Estate
- Main contractor: Sato Kogyo

The Tower 111 (タワー111, Tawā Toripuruwan) is a skyscraper in Toyama City, Japan. Construction of the 111 m (364 ft), 22-storey building was finished in 1994. As of 2011, the building was the tallest structure in Toyama Prefecture.
