= Sky Tower 41 =

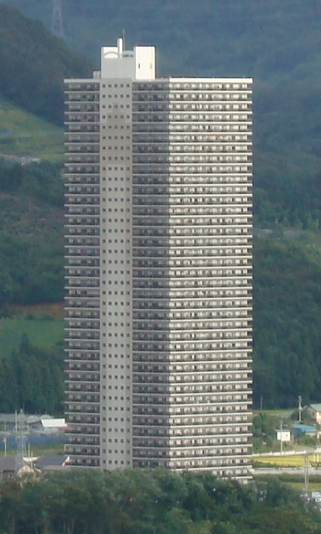

General information
- Type: Residential apartments
- Location: Kaminoyama, Yamagata Prefecture, Japan
- Coordinates: 38.1383°N 140.282°E
- Completed: July 1999

Height
- Roof: 133.95 m (439 ft 6 in)

Technical details
- Floor count: 41

Sky Tower 41 is a 41-story skyscraper in Kaminoyama, Yamagata Prefecture, Japan. The tallest building in Yamagata Prefecture, Sky Tower 41 is known for standing out against its rural surroundings, including rice fields adjacent to it.

== Overview ==
The building is a condominium with 41 floors above ground and 389 units in total. It is located on the right bank of Sugawa, a river flowing through Kaminoyama City. The building was developed and sold by Yamaman Urban Front, an affiliate of Yamaman, a Tokyo-based real estate developer known for the development of Yūkarigaoka new town in Sakura, Chiba. Despite restrictions on construction and development, the condominium site was exempted from zoning restrictions by the former governor of Yamagata Prefecture who was related to the owner of the land.

Each dwelling unit was designed for families with an area of 70 to 110 square meters and was promoted for a location for commuting to the city of Yamagata, which is approximately 20 minutes away by car. However, only a few units sold for the asking price and Yamaman Urban Front went bankrupt on January 31, 2014.

Adjacent to the condominium is Yamagata Prefectural Kaminoyama Senior High School and Kaminoyama Municipal Minami Junior High School is located on the opposite bank of Sugawa River.
