= Malios =

Skyscraper in Morioka, Iwate Prefecture, Japan

Coordinates: 39°42′04″N 141°08′00.5″E

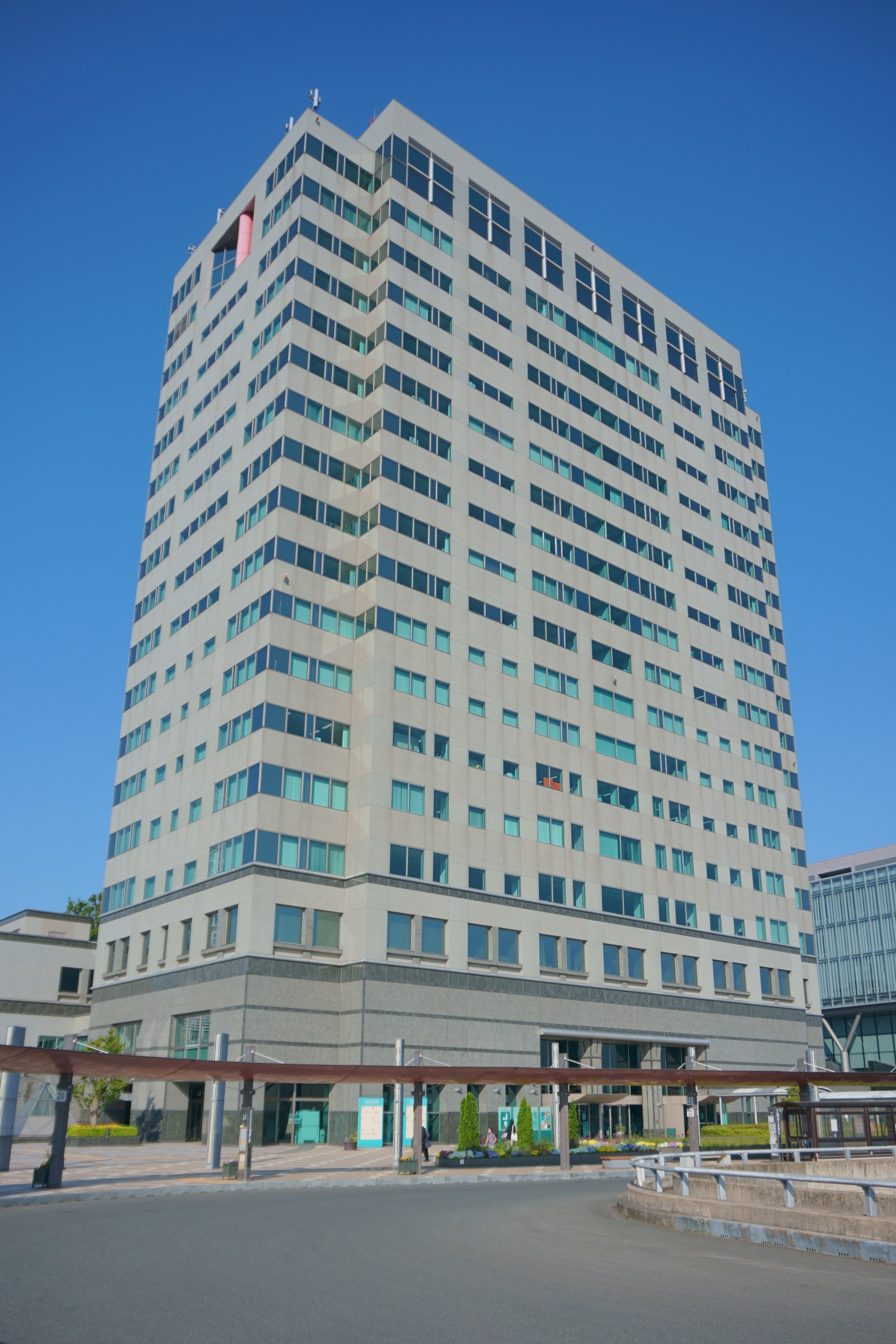
Malios

The Malios (マリオス) is a skyscraper located in Morioka, Iwate Prefecture, Japan. Construction of the 92-metre, 20-storey skyscraper was finished in 1997.
