= Sky Towers (Cluj Napoca) =

General information
- Status: Never built
- Location: Cluj Napoca, Romania
- Cost: US$ 270,000,000
- Owner: Damac

Height
- Roof: 125 m (410 ft)

Technical details
- Floor count: 32
- Floor area: 150,000 m^{2} (1,600,000 sq ft)

Sky Towers is a canceled mixed complex project in Cluj Napoca. It had three buildings of 32 floors each and a total surface for all three buildings of 150,000 m^{2}.

The first tower was structured as a 4 star hotel up to the 16th floor and the rest of the building is a 3 star hotel. The second building was an office building, and the third tower houses residential units smaller than 200 m^{2}.
