= United Nations Plaza (Bucharest) =

UN Plaza
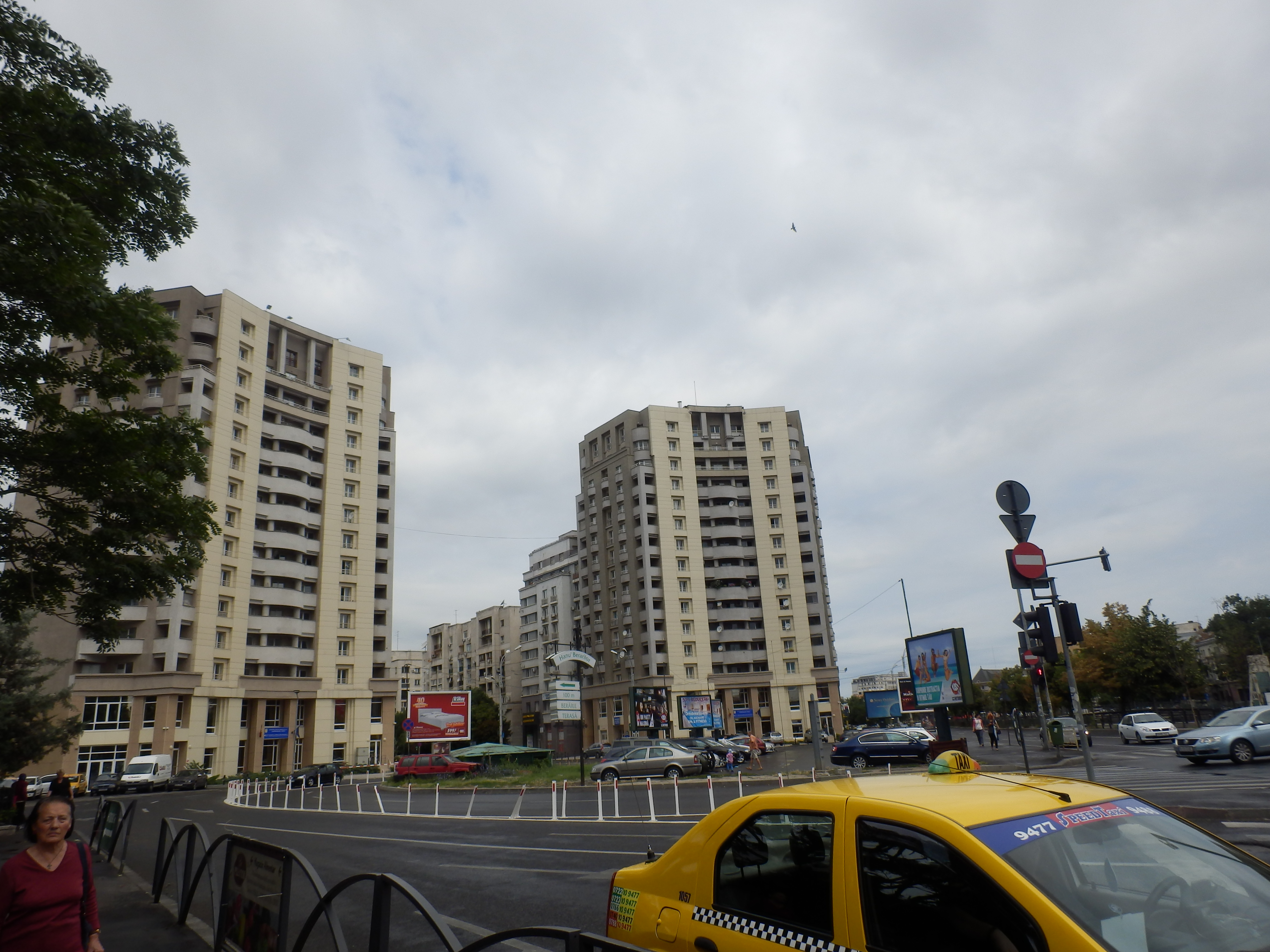
- Interactive map of the UN Plaza area

General information
- Status: Completed
- Location: Bucharest, Romania
- Coordinates: 44.429392°N 26.09546°E
- Construction started: 1976
- Opening: 1978

Height
- Roof: 66 m (217 ft)

Technical details
- Floor count: 18
- Floor area: 20,000 m^{2} (220,000 sq ft)

UN Plaza is a residential building located on Piața Națiunile Unite in Bucharest. It has 18 floors and a surface of 20,000 m^{2}.
