= Kaminoyama-Onsen Station =

Railway station in Kaminoyama, Yamagata Prefecture, Japan

Kaminoyama-Onsen Station かみのやま温泉駅
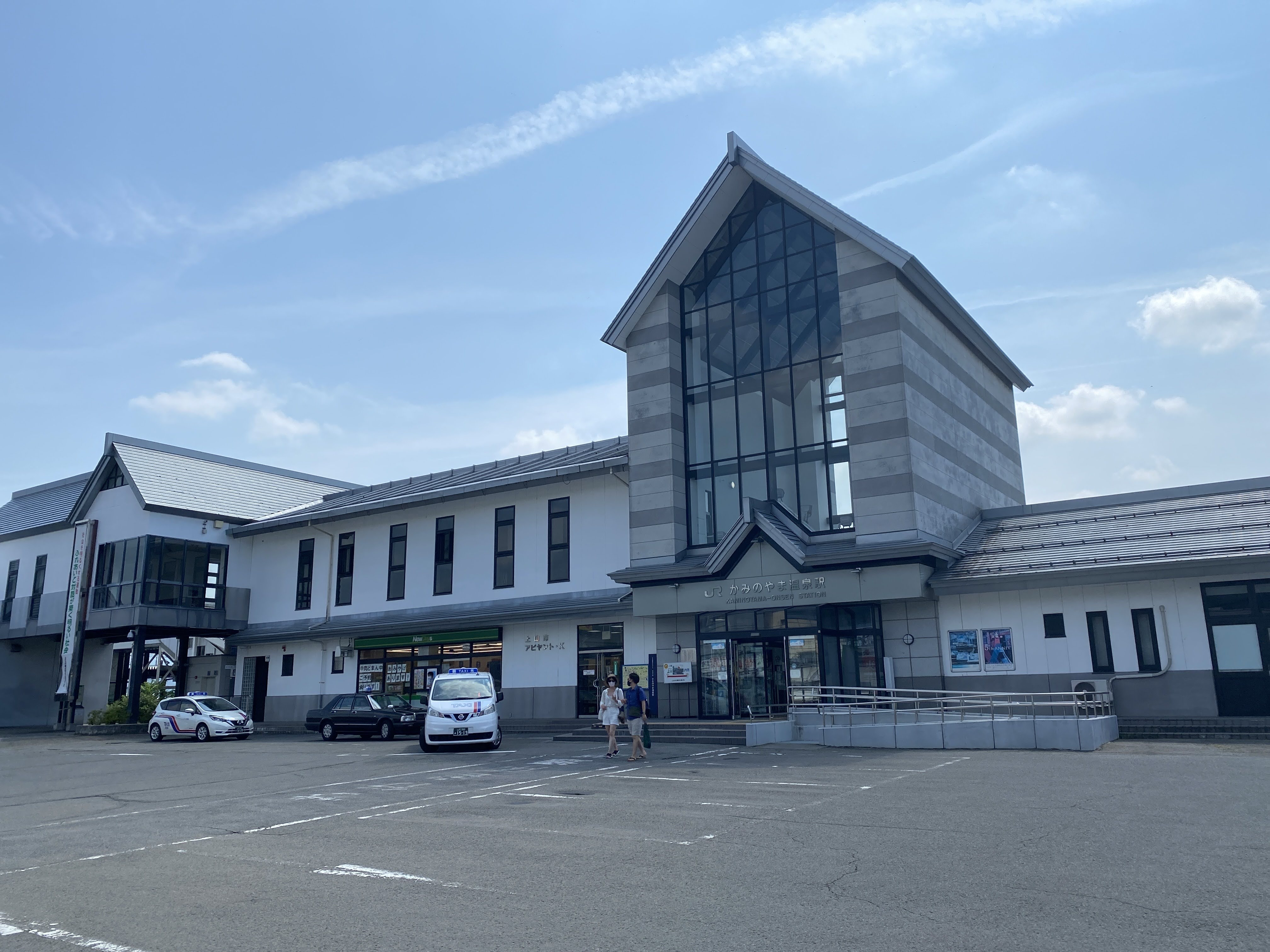
- Kaminoyama-Onsen Station in July 2021

General information
- Location: 1 Yarai, Kaminoyama-shi, Yamagata-ken 999–3134; Japan
- Coordinates: 38°9′8.05″N 140°16′43.15″E
- Operator: JR East
- Lines: Yamagata Shinkansen; Ōu Main Line
- Distance: 75.0 km (46.6 mi) from Fukushima
- Platforms: 1 side + 1 island platform
- Tracks: 3

Construction
- Structure type: At grade

Other information
- Status: Staffed (Midori no Madoguchi)

History
- Opened: 15 February 1901; 125 years ago
- Former names: Kaminoyama (until 1992)

Passengers
- FY2020: 1,158 daily

Services
Preceding station	JR East	Following station
Akayu towards Tokyo	Yamagata Shinkansen Tsubasa	Yamagata towards Shinjō
Uzen-Nakayama towards Fukushima	Yamagata Line	Mokichi-Kinenkan-mae towards Shinjō
Location
- Location within Yamagata Prefecture Location within Japan

Kaminoyama-Onsen Station (かみのやま温泉駅, Kaminoyama-onsen-eki) is a junction railway station in the city of Kaminoyama, Yamagata, Japan, operated by the East Japan Railway Company (JR East).

== Lines ==
Kaminoyama-Onsen Station is served by the Ōu Main Line (Yamagata Line) and the Yamagata Shinkansen. It is 75.0 rail kilometers from the terminus of both lines at Fukushima Station.

== Station layout ==
The station has a single side platform and a single island platform connected to the station building by a footbridge. The station has a Midori no Madoguchi staffed ticket office.

=== Platforms ===
1	■ Yamagata Shinkansen	for Yamagata and Shinjō
1	■ Yamagata Line	for Yamagata and Shinjō
2	■ Yamagata Shinkansen	for Yonezawa, Fukushima, Ōmiya, and Tokyo
2	■ Yamagata Line	for Akayu and Yonezawa
3	■ Yamagata Line	for Yamagata and Shinjō for Akayu and Yonezawa

== History ==
The station opened on 15 February 1901 as Kaminoyama Station (上ノ山駅). It was absorbed into the JR East network upon the privatization of JNR on 1 April 1987. Kaminoyama Station was renamed Kaminoyama-Onsen Station on 1 July 1992, coinciding with the opening of the Yamagata Shinkansen. A new station building was completed in June 2004.

== Passenger statistics ==
In fiscal 2018, the station was used by an average of 1521 passengers daily (boarding passengers only).

== Surrounding area ==
- Kaminoyama City Hall
- Kaminoyama Post Office
- Kaminoyama Castle
- Kaminoyama Onsen
