= Miyagino-dori Station =

Metro station in Sendai, Japan

T08 Miyagino-dori Station 宮城野通駅
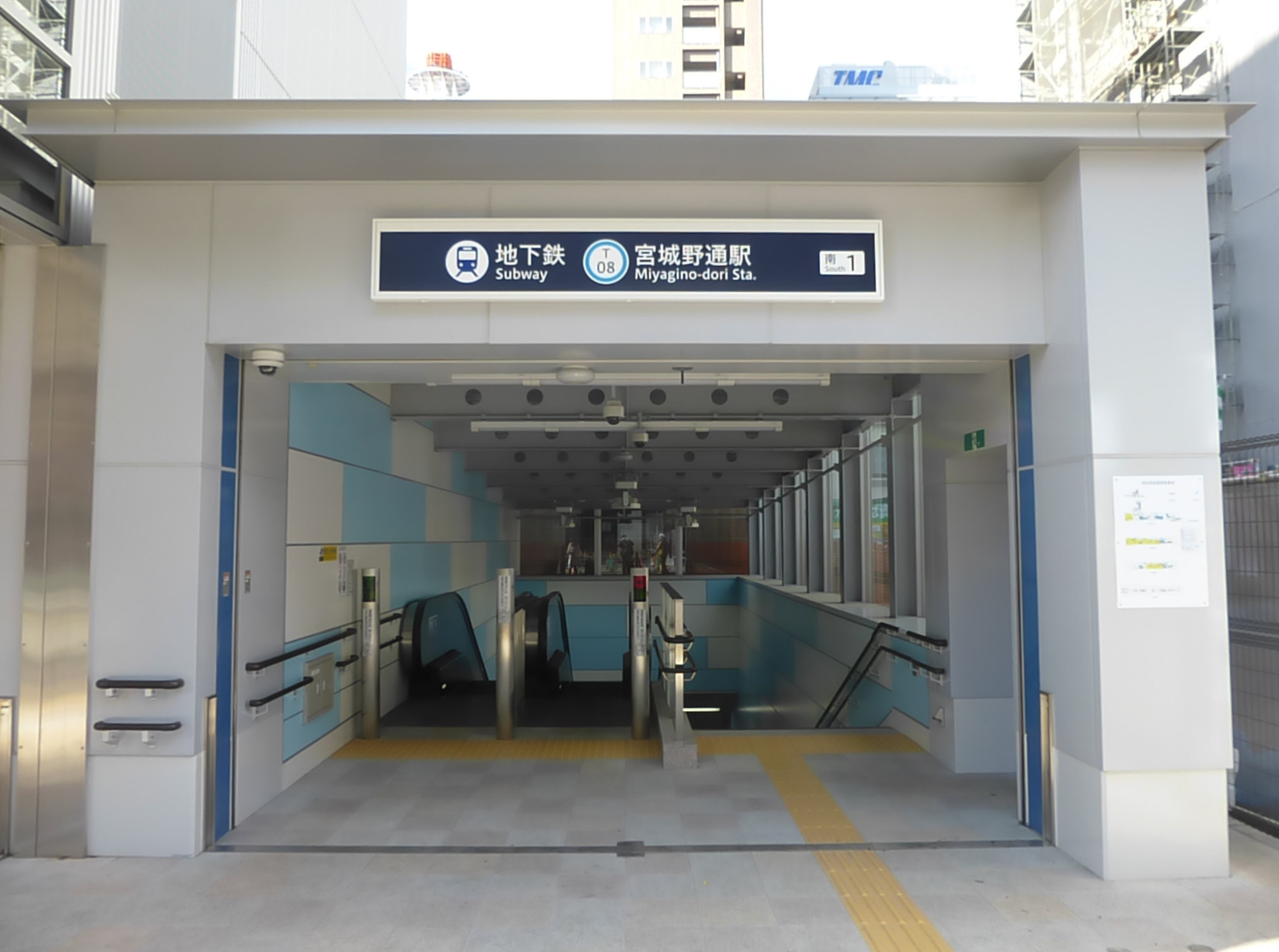
- The "South 1" entrance in December 2015

General information
- Location: 4 Chome-6 Tsutsujigaoka, Miyagino-ku, Sendai-shi, Miyagi-ken 983-0852; Japan
- Coordinates: 38.2583°N 140.8858°E
- System: Sendai Subway station
- Operator: Sendai City Transportation Bureau
- Line: Tōzai Line
- Distance: 7.2 km (4.5 mi) from Yagiyama Zoological Park
- Platforms: 1 island platform
- Tracks: 2

Construction
- Structure type: Underground
- Accessible: Yes

Other information
- Station code: T08
- Website: Official website

History
- Opened: 6 December 2015; 10 years ago

Passengers
- FY2015: 2,040 daily

Services
Preceding station	Sendai Subway	Following station
Sendai T07 towards Yagiyama Zoological Park	Tōzai Line	Rembo T09 towards Arai
Location
- Location within Miyagi Prefecture

Miyagino-dori Station (宮城野通駅, Miyagino-dōri-eki) is a subway station on the Sendai Subway Tōzai Line in Miyagino-ku, Sendai, Japan, operated by the municipal subway operator Sendai City Transportation Bureau.

== Lines ==
Miyagino-dori Station is served by the 13.9 km (8.6 mi) Sendai Subway Tōzai Line between Yagiyama Zoological Park and Arai, and is located 7.2 km (4.5 mi) from the western terminus of the line at Yagiyama Zoological Park Station. The station is numbered "T08".

== Station layout ==
The station has one island platform serving two tracks on the fourth basement ("B4F") level. The ticket barriers are located on the first basement ("B1F") level.

=== Platforms ===
1	■ Tōzai Line	■ for Arai
2	■ Tōzai Line	■ for Sendai and Yagiyama Zoological Park

== Gallery ==
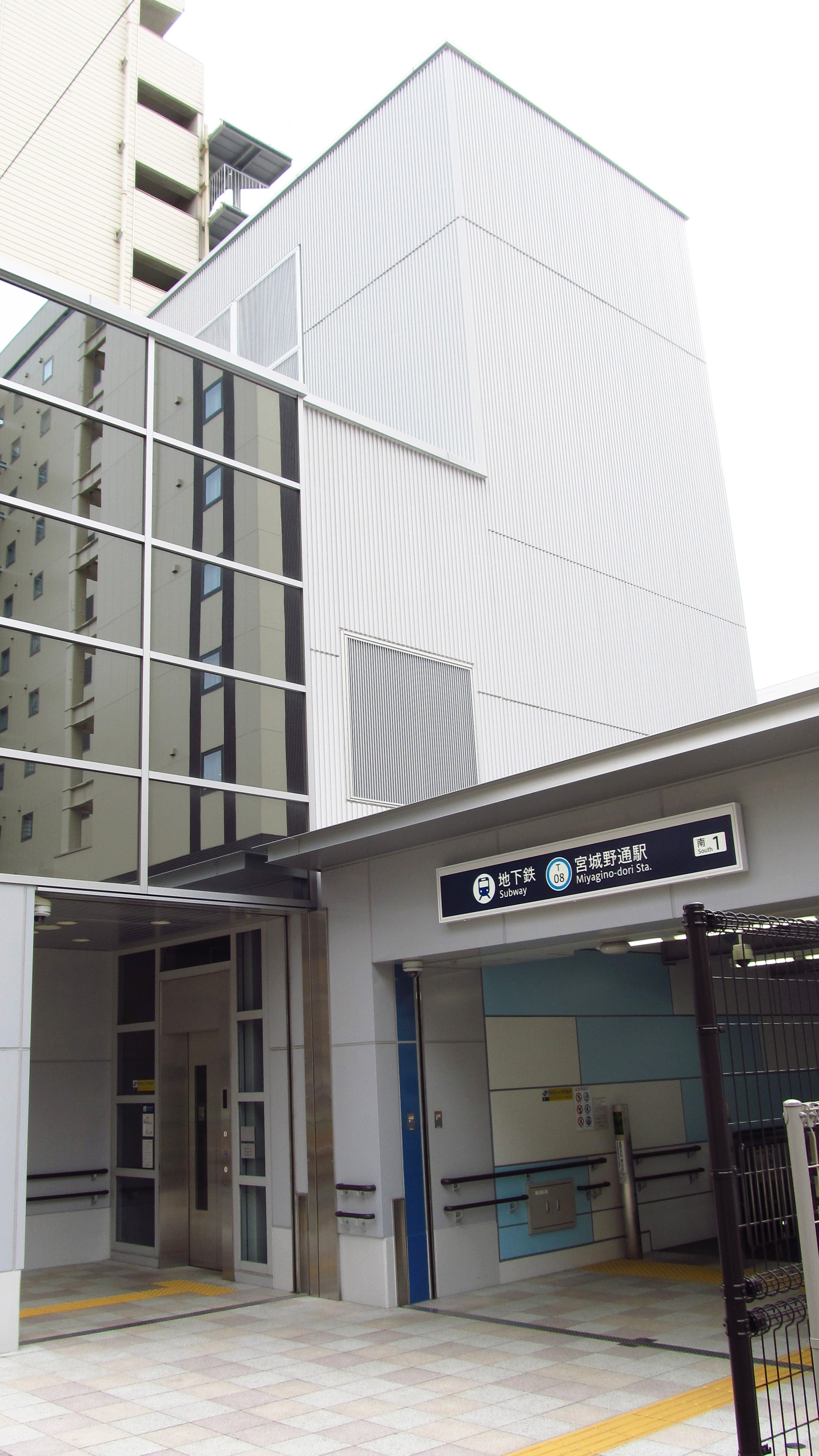
"South 1" entrance

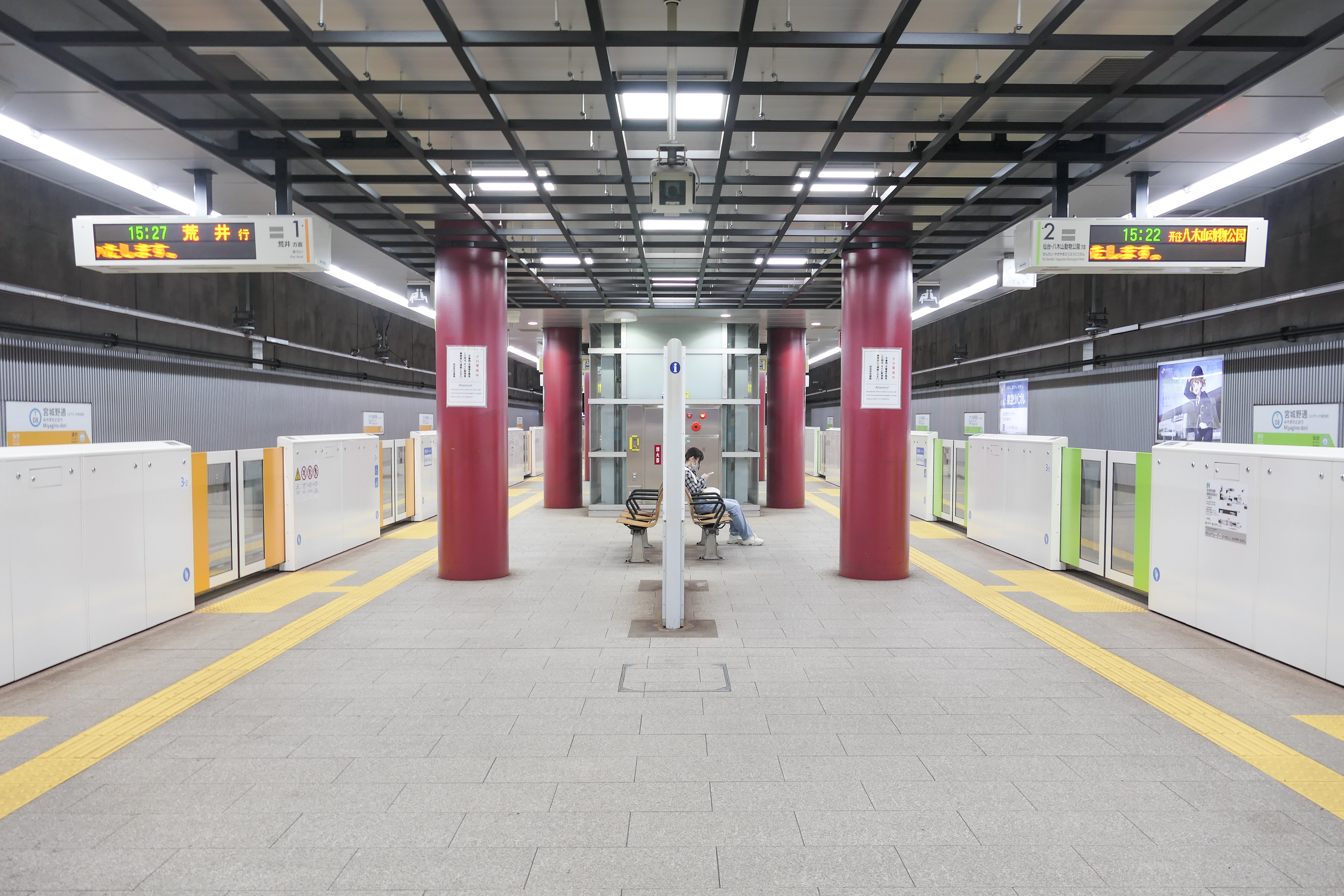
The platforms in June 2024

== Staffing ==
The station is staffed and operated by sub-contracted employees from the security company Alsok.

== History ==
The station opened on 6 December 2015, coinciding with the opening of the Tōzai Line.

== Passenger statistics ==
In fiscal 2015, the station was used by an average of 2,040 passengers daily.

== Surrounding area ==
- Sendai Station
- Tohoku Fukushi University

== See also ==
- List of railway stations in Japan
