= Yakushido Station (Miyagi) =

Metro station in Sendai, Japan

T10 Yakushido Station 薬師堂駅
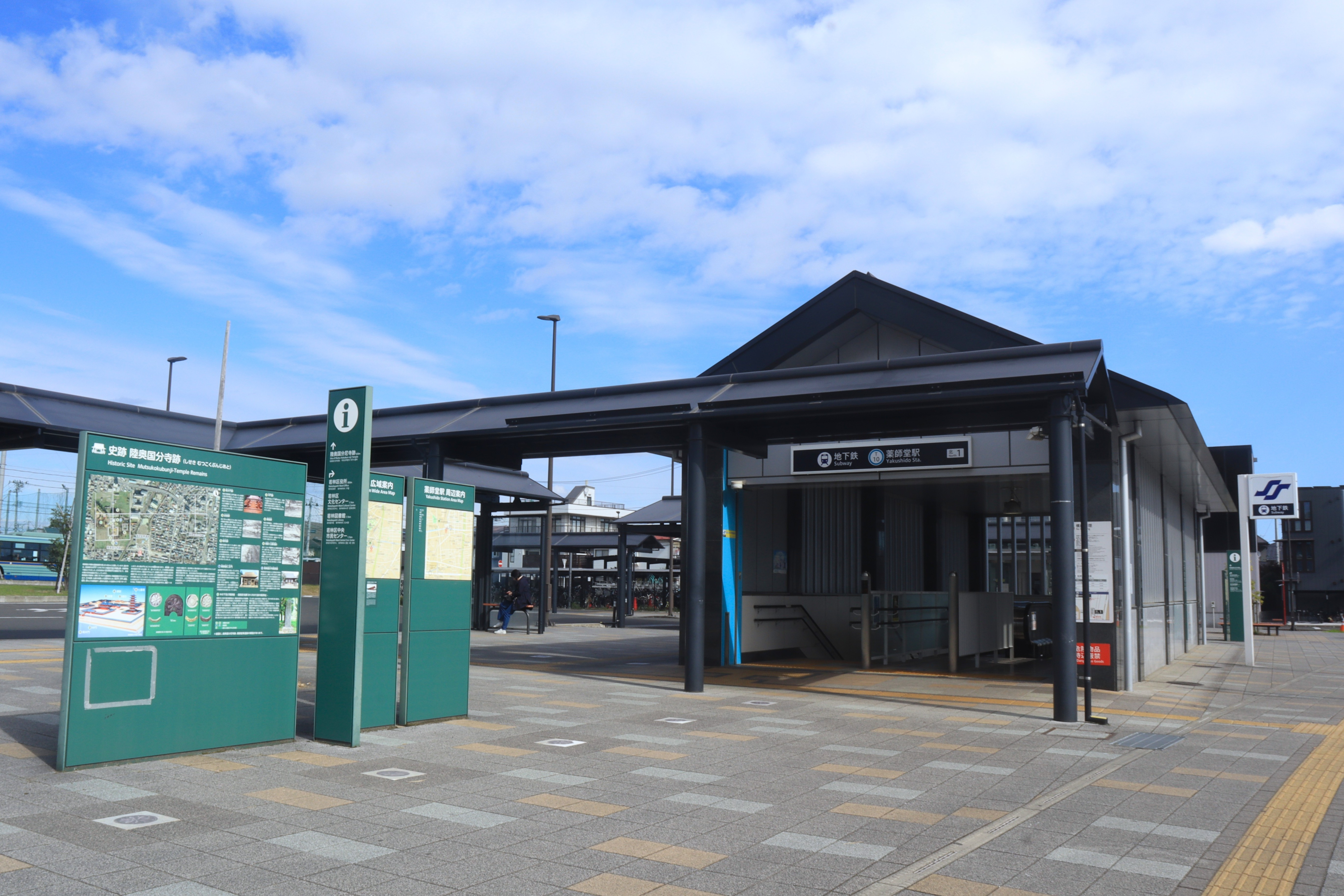
- The "North 1" entrance in October 2025

General information
- Location: Wakabayashi-ku, Sendai-shi, Miyagi-ken 984-0048; Japan
- Coordinates: 38.2496°N 140.9061°E
- System: Sendai Subway station
- Operator: Sendai City Transportation Bureau
- Line: Tōzai Line
- Distance: 9.5 km (5.9 mi) from Yagiyama Zoological Park
- Platforms: 1 island platform
- Tracks: 2

Construction
- Structure type: Underground
- Accessible: Yes

Other information
- Status: Staffed
- Station code: T10
- Website: Official website

History
- Opened: 6 December 2015; 10 years ago

Passengers
- FY2015 (Daily): 3,941

Services
Preceding station	Sendai Subway	Following station
Rembo T09 towards Yagiyama Zoological Park	Tōzai Line	Oroshimachi T11 towards Arai
Location
- Location within Miyagi Prefecture

Yakushido Station (薬師堂駅, Yakushidō-eki) is a subway station on the Sendai Subway Tōzai Line in Wakabayashi-ku, Sendai, Japan, operated by the municipal subway operator Sendai City Transportation Bureau.

== Lines ==
Yakushido Station is served by the 13.9 km (8.6 mi) Sendai Subway Tōzai Line between Yagiyama Zoological Park and Arai, and is located 9.5 km (5.9 mi) from the western terminus of the line at Yagiyama Zoological Park Station. The station is numbered "T10".

== Station layout ==
The station has one island platform serving two tracks on the second basement ("B2F") level. The ticket barriers are located on the first basement ("B1F") level.

=== Platforms ===
1	■ Tōzai Line	■ for Arai
2	■ Tōzai Line	■ for Sendai and Yagiyama Zoological Park

== Gallery ==
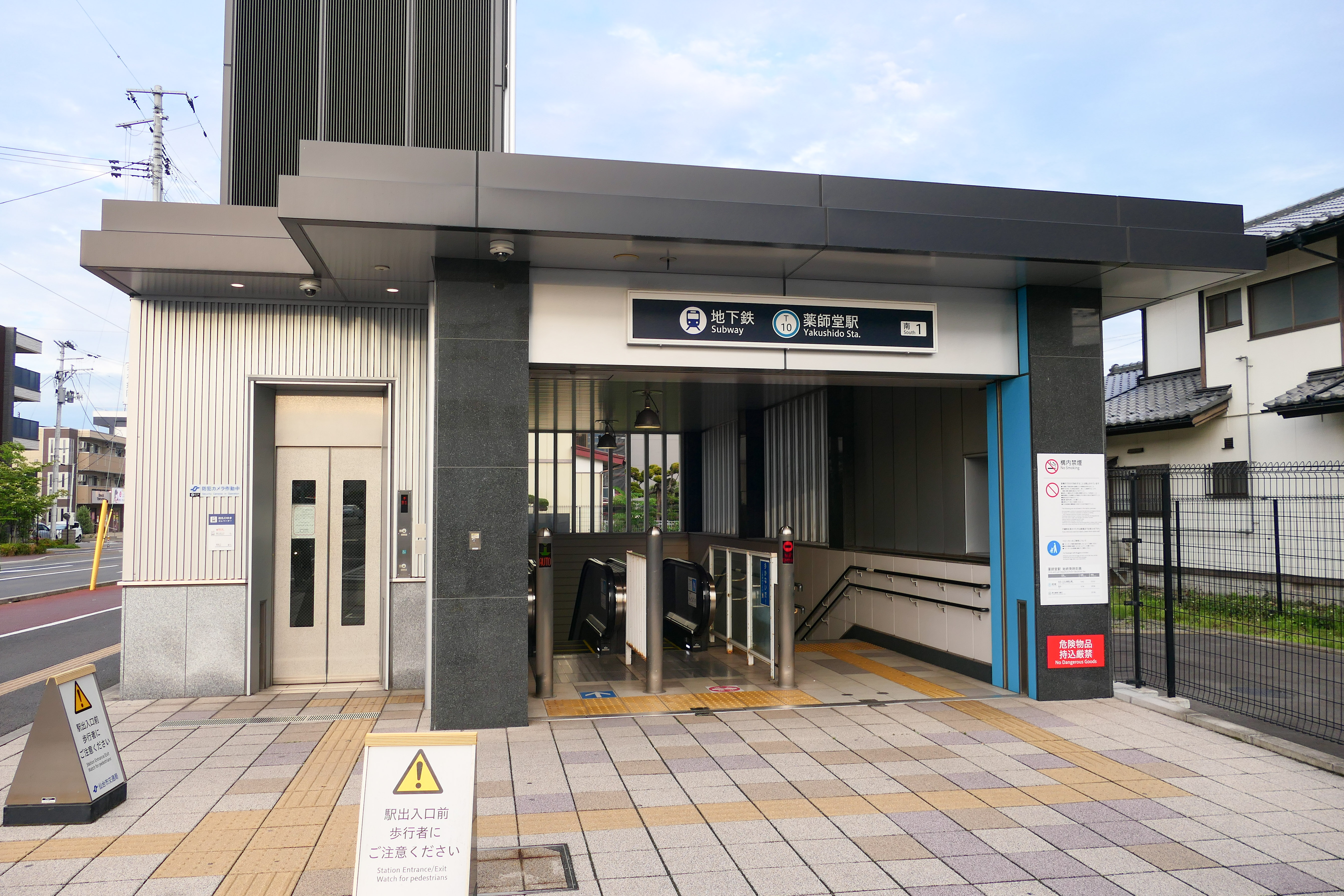
"South 1" entrance

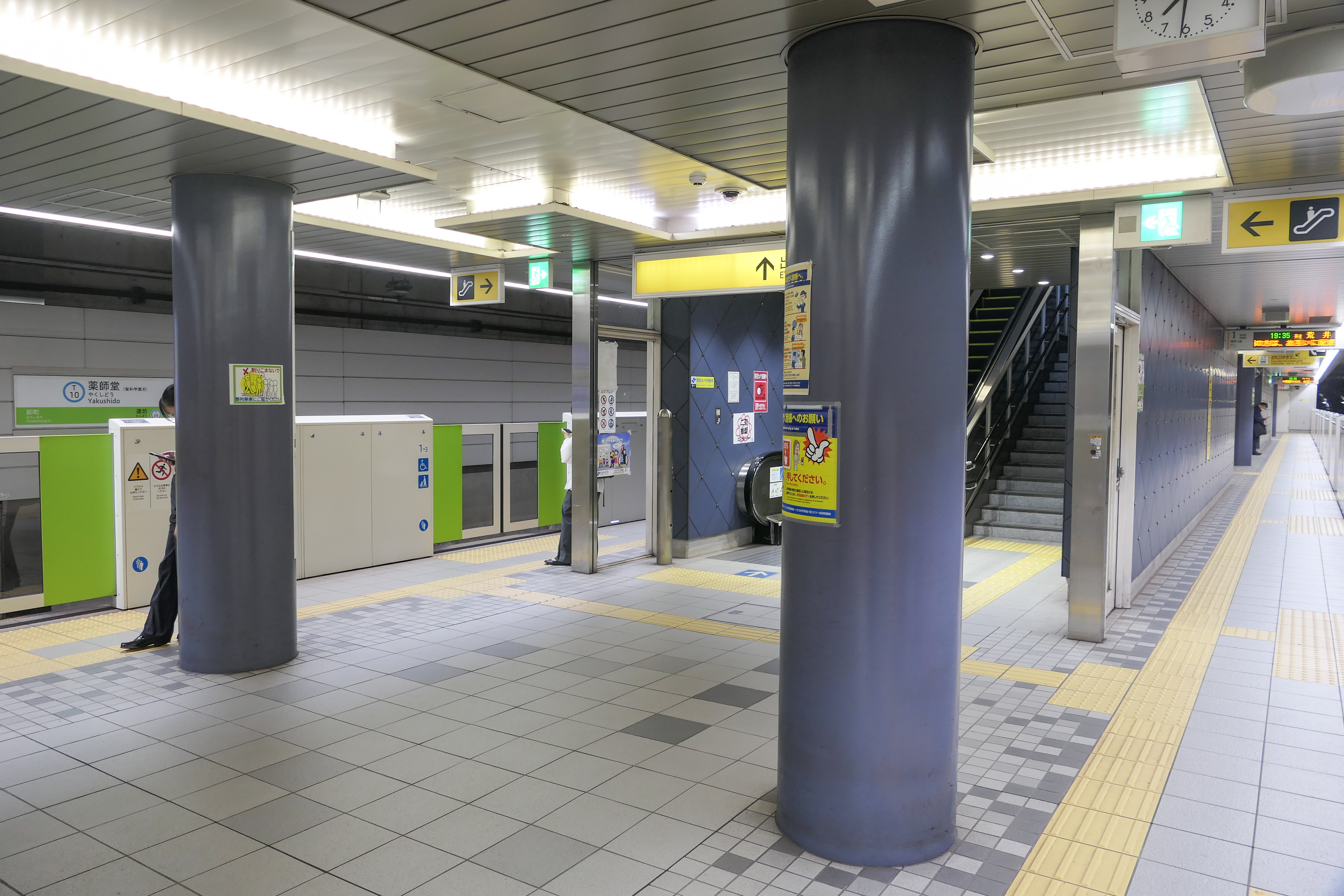
platform

== Staffing ==
The station is staffed and operated by sub-contracted employees from the security company Alsok.

== History ==
The station opened on 6 December 2015, coinciding with the opening of the Tōzai Line.

== Passenger statistics ==
In fiscal 2015, the station was used by an average of 3,941 passengers daily.

== Surrounding area ==
- Seiwa Gakuen High School Yakushido Campus
- Mutsu Kokubun-ji Yakushidō temple
- Miyagi Baseball Stadium

== See also ==
- List of railway stations in Japan
