= Sendai Subway 2000 series =

Japanese train type

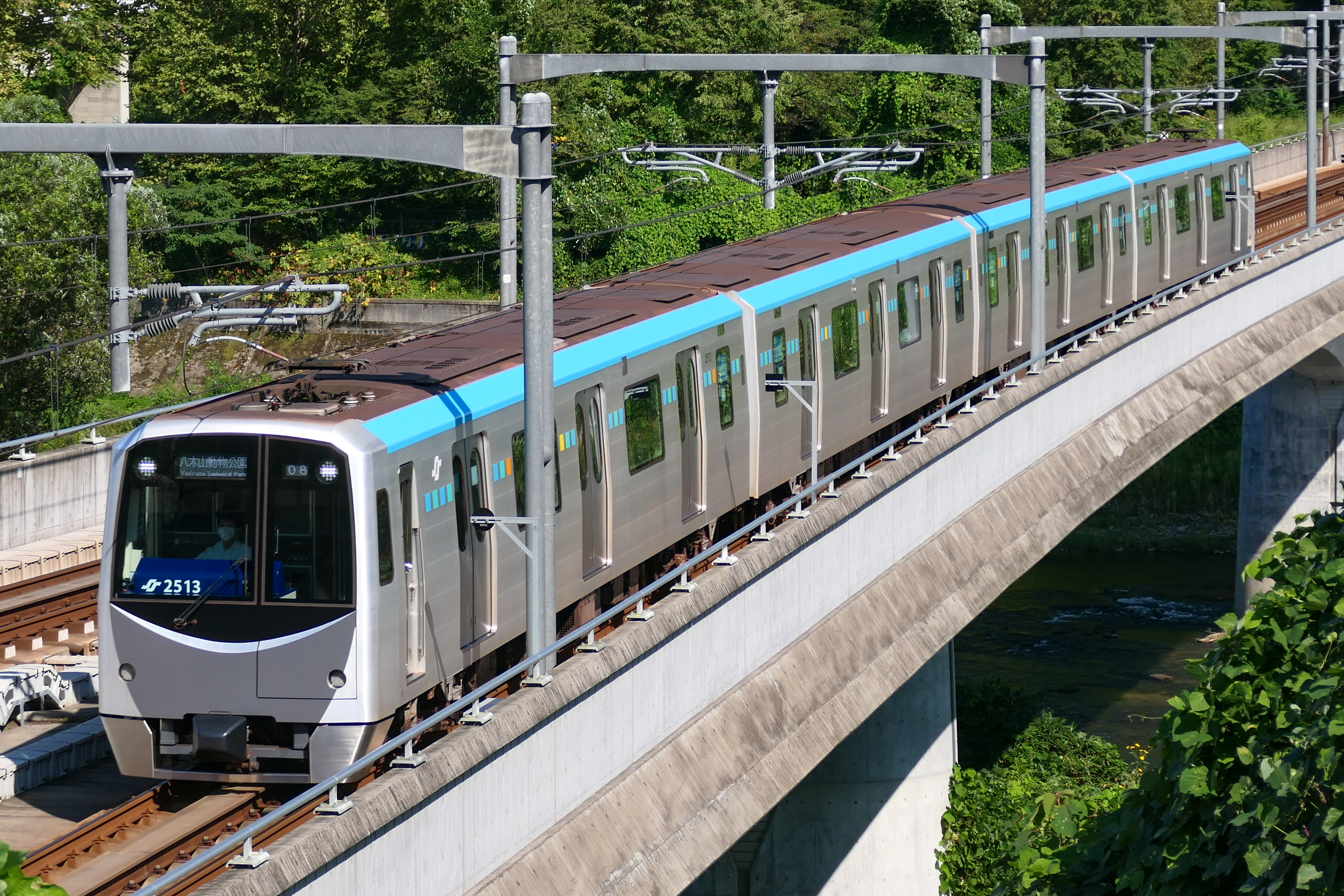
- Set 2110 in service in September 2021
- Manufacturer: Kinki Sharyo
- Constructed: 2013–2015
- Entered service: 6 December 2015
- Number built: 60 vehicles (15 sets)
- Number in service: 60 vehicles (15 sets)
- Formation: 4 cars per trainset
- Fleet numbers: 2101–2115
- Operators: Sendai City Transportation Bureau
- Depots: Arai
- Lines served: Sendai Subway Tōzai Line

Specifications
- Car body construction: Aluminium alloy
- Train length: 66.5 m (218 ft 2 in)
- Car length: 16,750 mm (54 ft 11 in) (end cars); 16,500 mm (54 ft 2 in) (intermediate cars)
- Width: 2,494 mm (8 ft 2.2 in)
- Height: 3,145 mm (10 ft 3.8 in)
- Doors: 3 pairs per side
- Maximum speed: 70 km/h (45 mph)
- Traction system: Mitsubishi Electric MAP-144-15V265 2-level IGBT–VVVF
- Traction motors: 8 × Mitsubishi MB-7012-A 135 kW (181 hp) 3-phase AC linear induction motor
- Power output: 1.08 MW (1,450 hp)
- Acceleration: 3.5 km/(h⋅s) (2.2 mph/s)
- Deceleration: 4.0 km/(h⋅s) (2.5 mph/s) (service); 4.5 km/(h⋅s) (2.8 mph/s) (emergency)
- Electric system(s): 1,500 V DC (nominal) from overhead catenary
- Current collection: Pantograph
- UIC classification: B′B′+B′B′+B′B′+B′B′
- Safety system(s): ATC
- Track gauge: 1,435 mm (4 ft 8 1/2 in)

The Sendai Subway 2000 series (仙台市交通局2000系) is a Japanese rapid transit electric multiple unit (EMU) train type operated by Sendai City Transportation Bureau on the Sendai Subway Tōzai Line, which opened in December 2015.

== Overview ==
The fleet of 15 four-car linear motor-powered EMUs was manufactured by Kinki Sharyo. Construction started in April 2013, with the first set delivered to Arai Depot during fiscal 2014 for testing. The entire fleet of 15 sets (60 vehicles) was delivered before the line opened on 6 December 2015.

== Formations ==
The four-car trainsets are formed as shown below with car 1 at the Arai end.

Car No.	1	2	3	4
Designation	Mc1	M1	M2	Mc2
Numbering	2100	2200	2400	2500
Weight (t)	28.3	27.5	27.6	28.4
Capacity (total/seated)	92/28	102/36	102/36	92/28

The end cars are each fitted with one KP83C single-arm pantograph.

== Interior ==
Passenger accommodation consists of longitudinal bench seating, with a wheelchair space in each car. The seats are 475 mm (18.7 in) wide per person. 17-inch (430 mm) LCD passenger information screens are provided above each doorway, with information in Japanese, English, Chinese, and Korean.

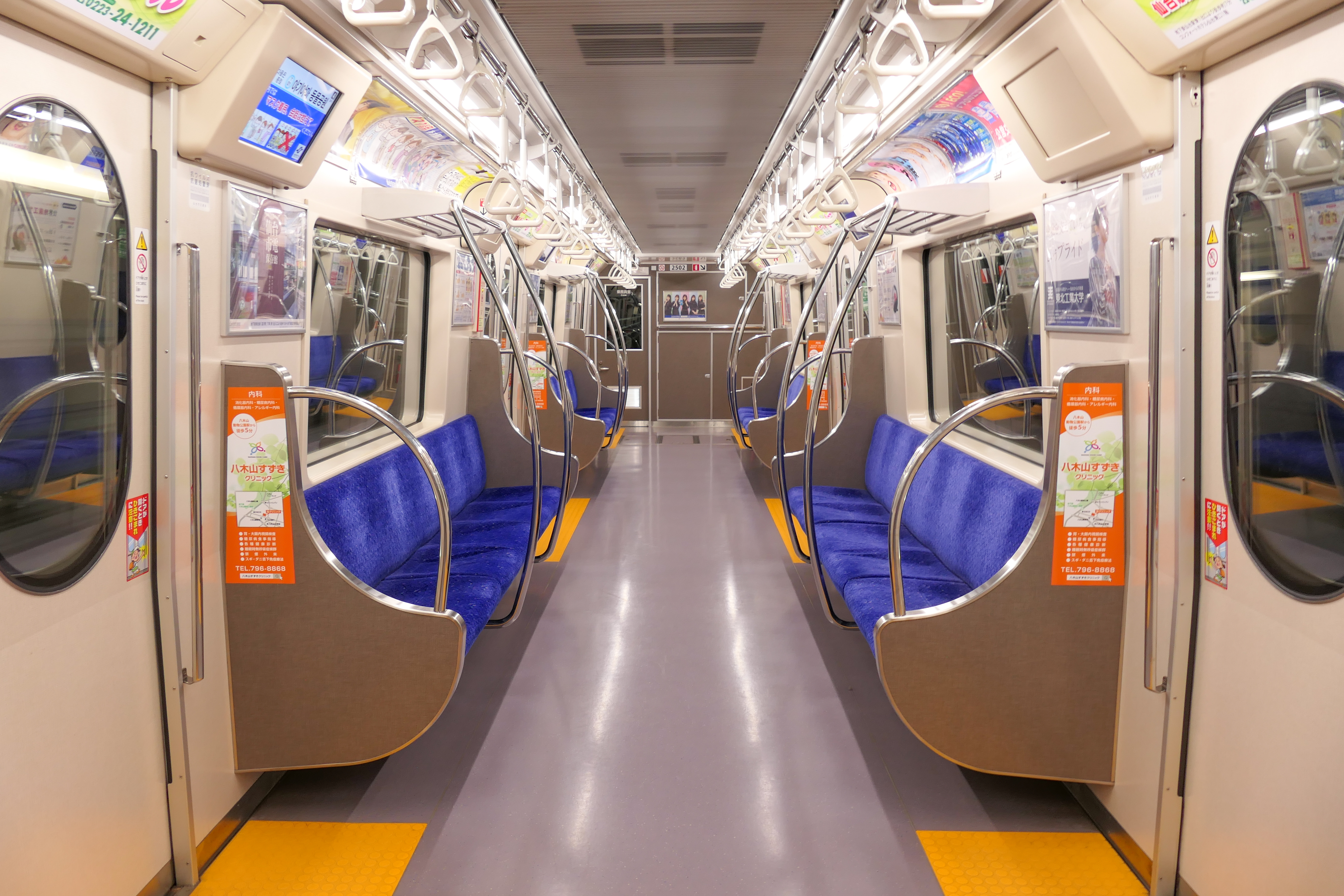
Interior view in September 2021

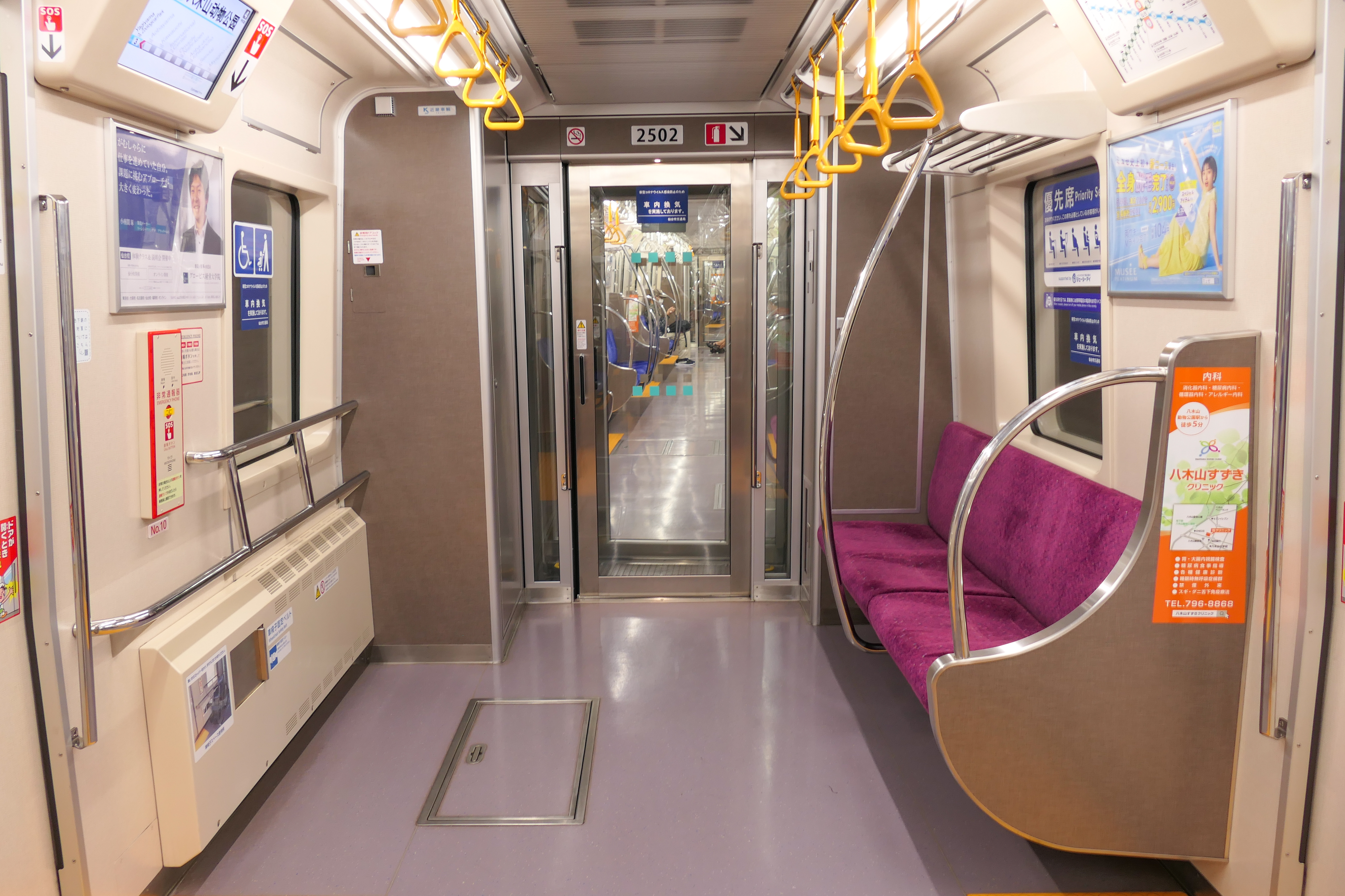
Priority seating and wheelchair space in September 2021

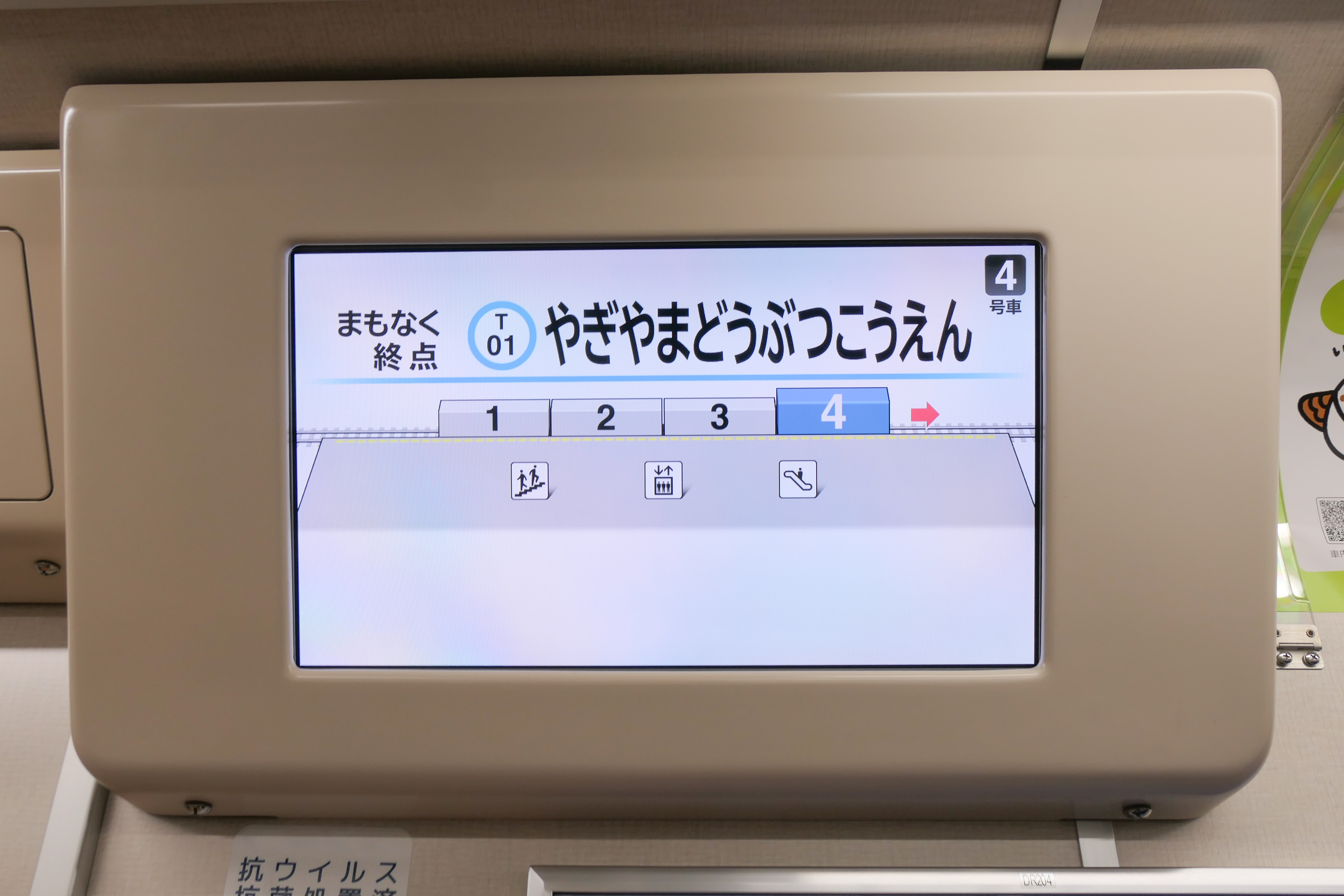
An LCD passenger information display above a doorway in September 2021

== History ==
In May 2012, Kinki Sharyo announced that it had received an order to build 15 new four-car 2000 series EMUs for the Sendai Subway Tōzai Line. The design of the new trains on order was officially unveiled by the Sendai City Transportation Bureau in November 2012. The first train was shown off to the media at Arai Depot in October 2014.

== See also ==
- Sendai Subway 1000 series
