= Tōzai Line (Sendai) =

Metro line in Sendai, Japan

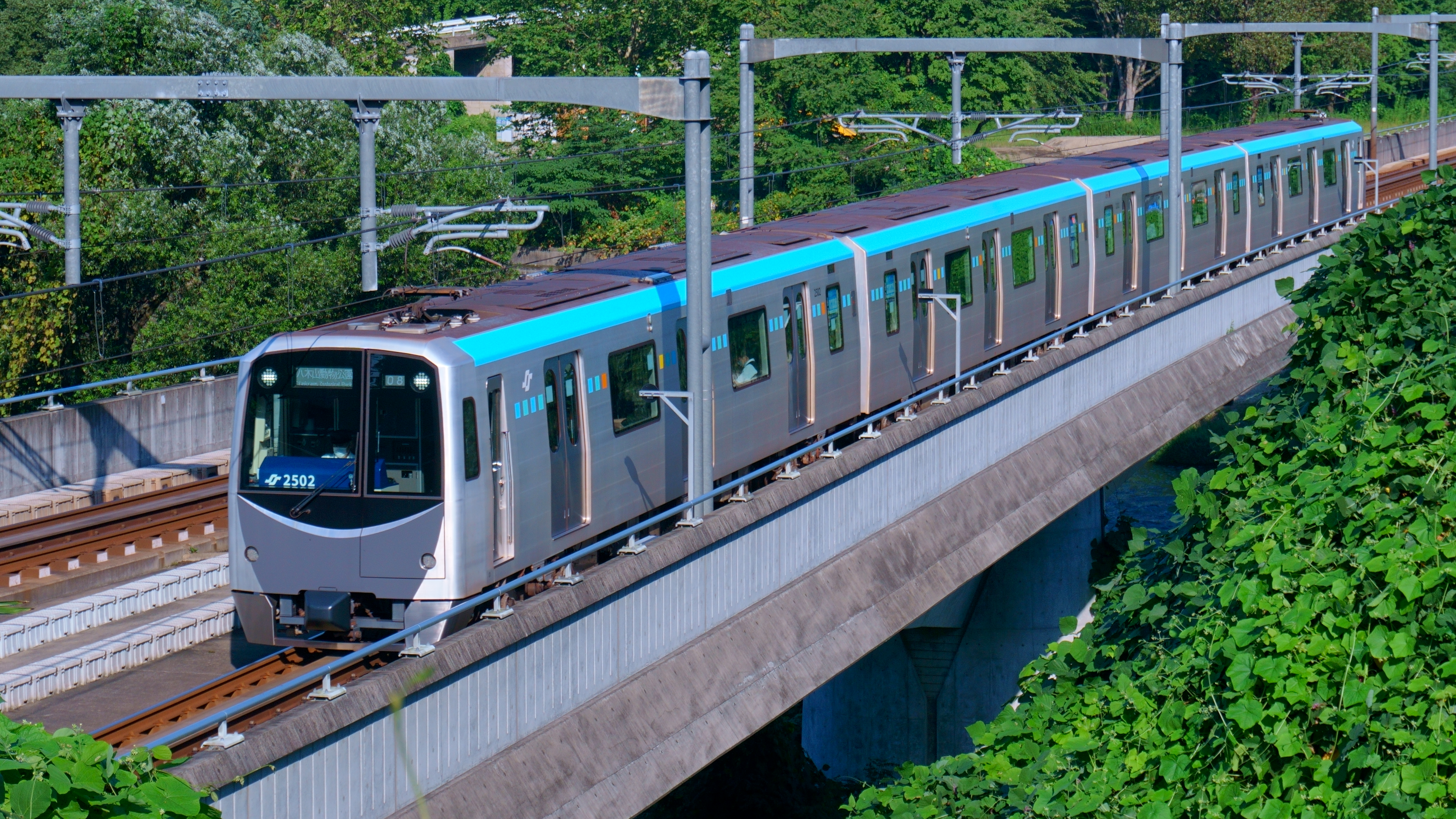

Overview
- Native name: 東西線
- Status: Operational
- Owner: Sendai City Transportation Bureau
- Locale: Sendai, Miyagi
- Termini: Yagiyama Zoological Park; Arai
- Stations: 13

Service
- Type: Rapid transit
- System: Sendai Subway
- Depot(s): Arai
- Rolling stock: 2000 series
- Daily ridership: Approx. 80,000 daily (forecast)

History
- Opened: 6 December 2015; 10 years ago

Technical
- Line length: 13.9 km (8.6 mi)
- Number of tracks: 2
- Track gauge: 1,435 mm (4 ft 8 1/2 in) standard gauge
- Electrification: 1,500 V DC from overhead catenary
- Operating speed: 70 km/h (45 mph)

The Tōzai Line (東西線, Tōzai-sen) is one of the two lines of the Sendai Subway system operated by the Sendai City Transportation Bureau in the city of Sendai, Japan. It opened on 6 December 2015. The Tozai Line uses linear motor propulsion.

== Stations ==
All stations are located in Sendai.

No.	Station name	Japanese	Distance (km)		Transfers	Location
No.	Station name	Japanese	Between stations	Total	Transfers	Location
T01	Yagiyama Zoological Park	八木山動物公園	-	0.0		Taihaku-ku
T02	Aobayama	青葉山	2.1	2.1		Aoba-ku
T03	Kawauchi	川内	1.6	3.7		Aoba-ku
T04	International Center	国際センター	0.6	4.3		Aoba-ku
T05	Omachi Nishi-koen	大町西公園	0.7	5.0		Aoba-ku
T06	Aoba-dori Ichibancho	青葉通一番町	0.7	5.7		Aoba-ku
T07	Sendai	仙台	0.8	6.5	Namboku Line ( N10 ); Tohoku Shinkansen; Akita Shinkansen; ■ Tohoku Main Line; ■ Senzan Line; ■ Joban Line; ■ Senseki Line; Sendai Airport Line	Aoba-ku
T08	Miyagino-dori	宮城野通	0.7	7.2		Miyagino-ku
T09	Rembo	連坊	1.2	8.4		Wakabayashi-ku
T10	Yakushido	薬師堂	1.1	9.5		Wakabayashi-ku
T11	Oroshimachi	卸町	1.5	11.0		Wakabayashi-ku
T12	Rokuchonome	六丁の目	1.3	12.3		Wakabayashi-ku
T13	Arai	荒井	1.6	13.9		Wakabayashi-ku

From the start of operations on the line, nine out of the line's 13 stations are staffed and operated by sub-contracted employees from the security company Alsok. Operations at Omachi Nishi-koen Station will also be sub-contracted to Alsok from fiscal 2018, leaving only the two termini and Sendai Station staffed by Sendai City Transportation Bureau employees.

== Rolling stock ==
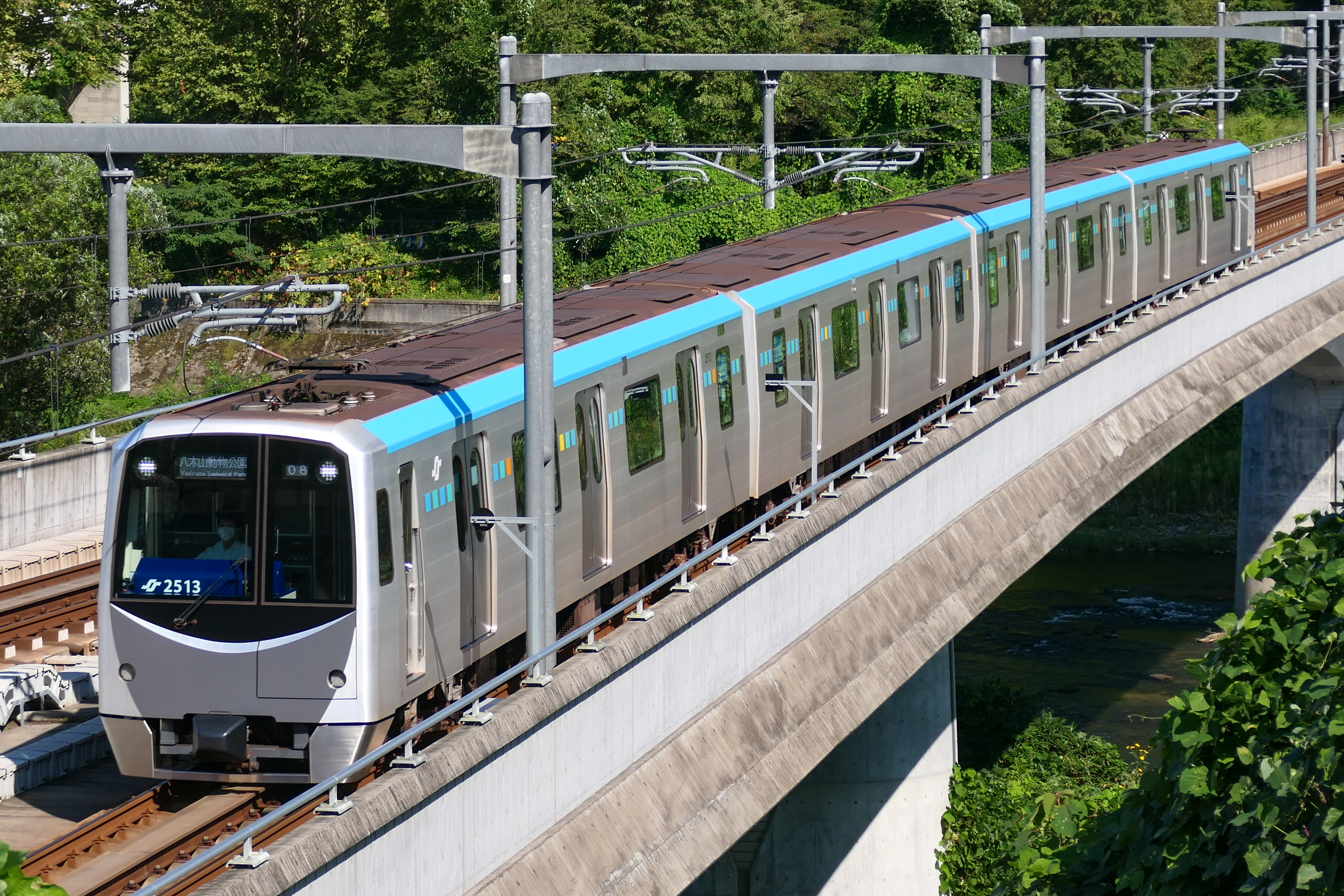
A 2000 series train in service in September 2021

Services are operated by a fleet of 15 four-car Sendai Subway 2000 series electric trains manufactured by Kinki Sharyo.

== Passenger statistics ==
According to forecasts published by Sendai City Transportation Bureau in August 2012, the line is expected initially to be used by an average of approximately 80,000 passengers daily (boarding passengers only).

== History ==
The line opened on 6 December 2015, with a departure ceremony for the first train at Arai Station.

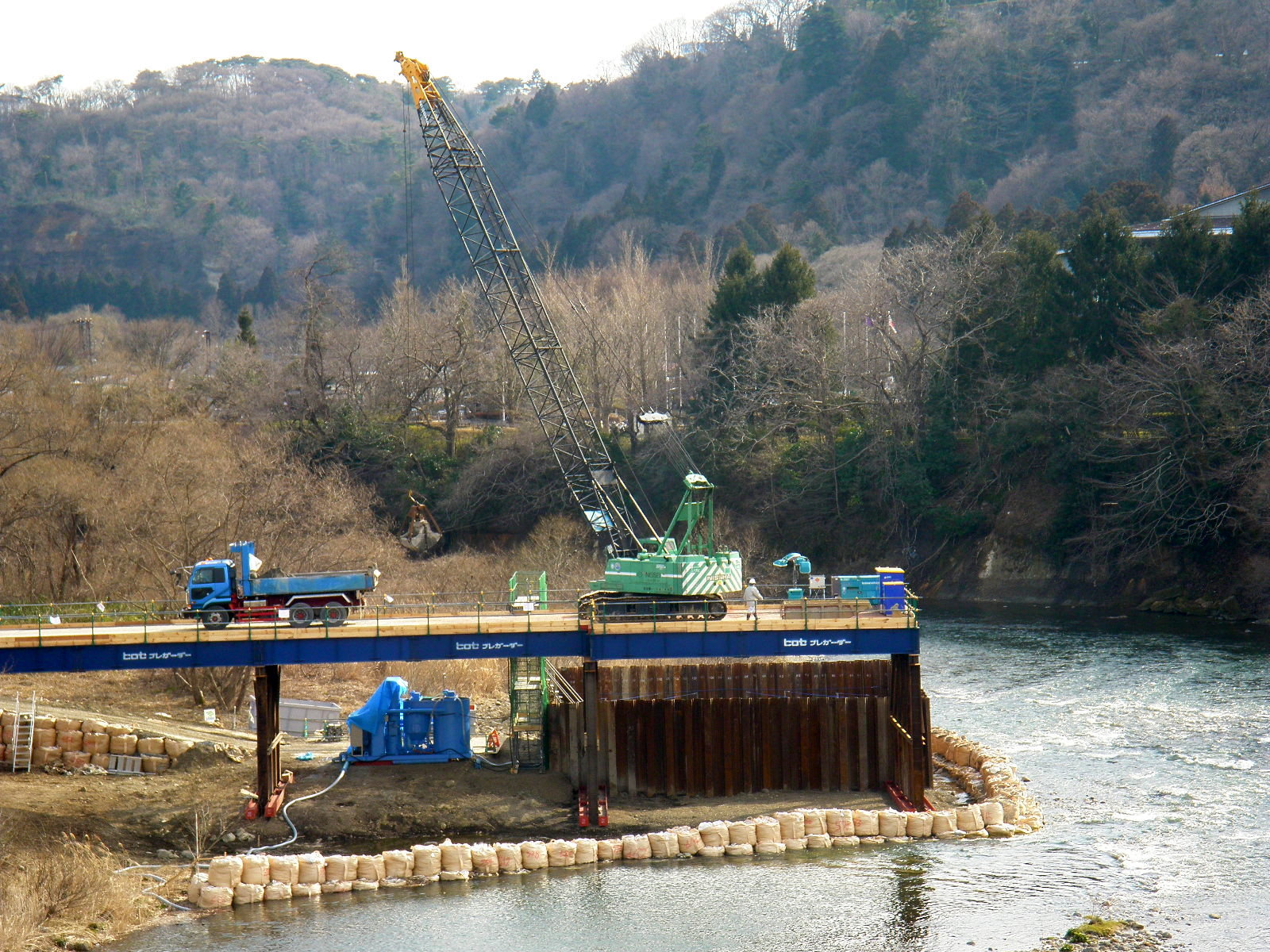
Construction work on the Hirosegawa Bridge in March 2009
