= Yagiyama Zoological Park Station =

Metro station in Sendai, Japan

T01 Yagiyama Zoological Park Station 八木山動物公園駅
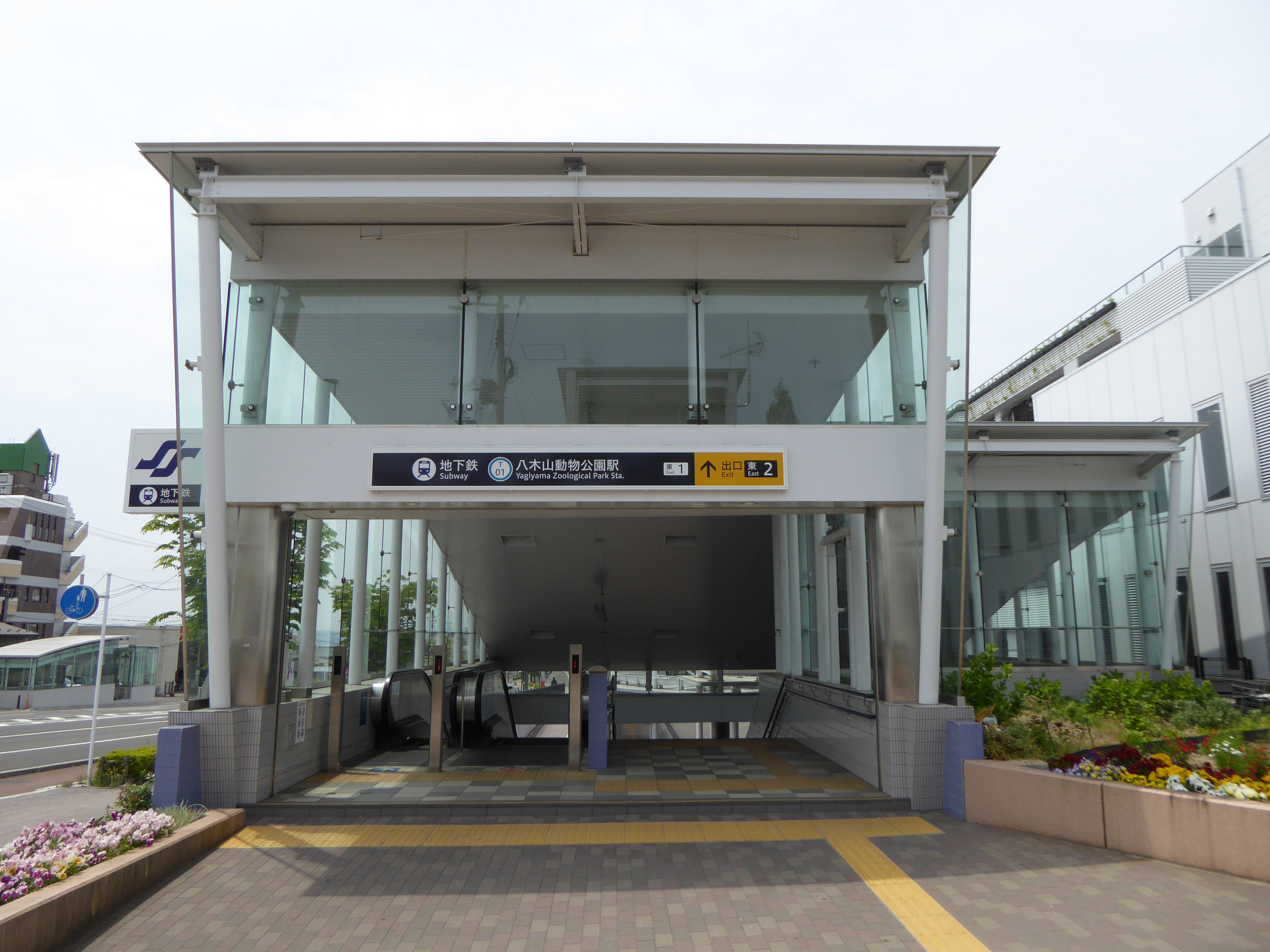
- East entrance 1 in 2022

General information
- Location: Taihaku-ku, Sendai-shi, Miyagi-ken 982-0801; Japan
- Coordinates: 38.2428°N 140.8435°E
- Elevation: 136.4 m (448 ft)
- System: Sendai Subway station
- Operator: Sendai City Transportation Bureau
- Line: Tōzai Line
- Distance: 13.9 km (8.6 mi) from Arai
- Platforms: 1 island platform
- Tracks: 2
- Connections: Bus stop

Construction
- Structure type: Underground
- Accessible: Yes

Other information
- Status: Staffed
- Station code: T01
- Website: Official website

History
- Opened: 6 December 2015; 10 years ago

Passengers
- FY2015: 4,451 daily

Services
Preceding station	Sendai Subway	Following station
Terminus	Tōzai Line	Aobayama T02 towards Arai
Location
- Location within Miyagi Prefecture

Yagiyama Zoological Park Station (八木山動物公園駅, Yagiyama Dōbutsu-kōen-eki) is a subway station on the Sendai Subway Tōzai Line in Taihaku-ku, Sendai, Japan, operated by the municipal subway operator Sendai City Transportation Bureau. It is located near and named for the Sendai Yagiyama Zoological Park.

== Lines ==
Yagiyama Zoological Park Station is served by the 13.9 km (8.6 mi) Sendai Subway Tōzai Line, and forms the western terminus of the line. The station is numbered "T01".

== Station layout ==
The station has one island platform serving two tracks on the third basement ("B3F") level. The ticket barriers are located on the second basement ("B2F") level.

The station is located at an elevation of 136.4 m (448 ft), making it the highest underground station in Japan.

=== Platforms ===
1	■ Tōzai Line	■ for Sendai and Arai
2	■ Tōzai Line	■ for Sendai and Arai

== Gallery ==
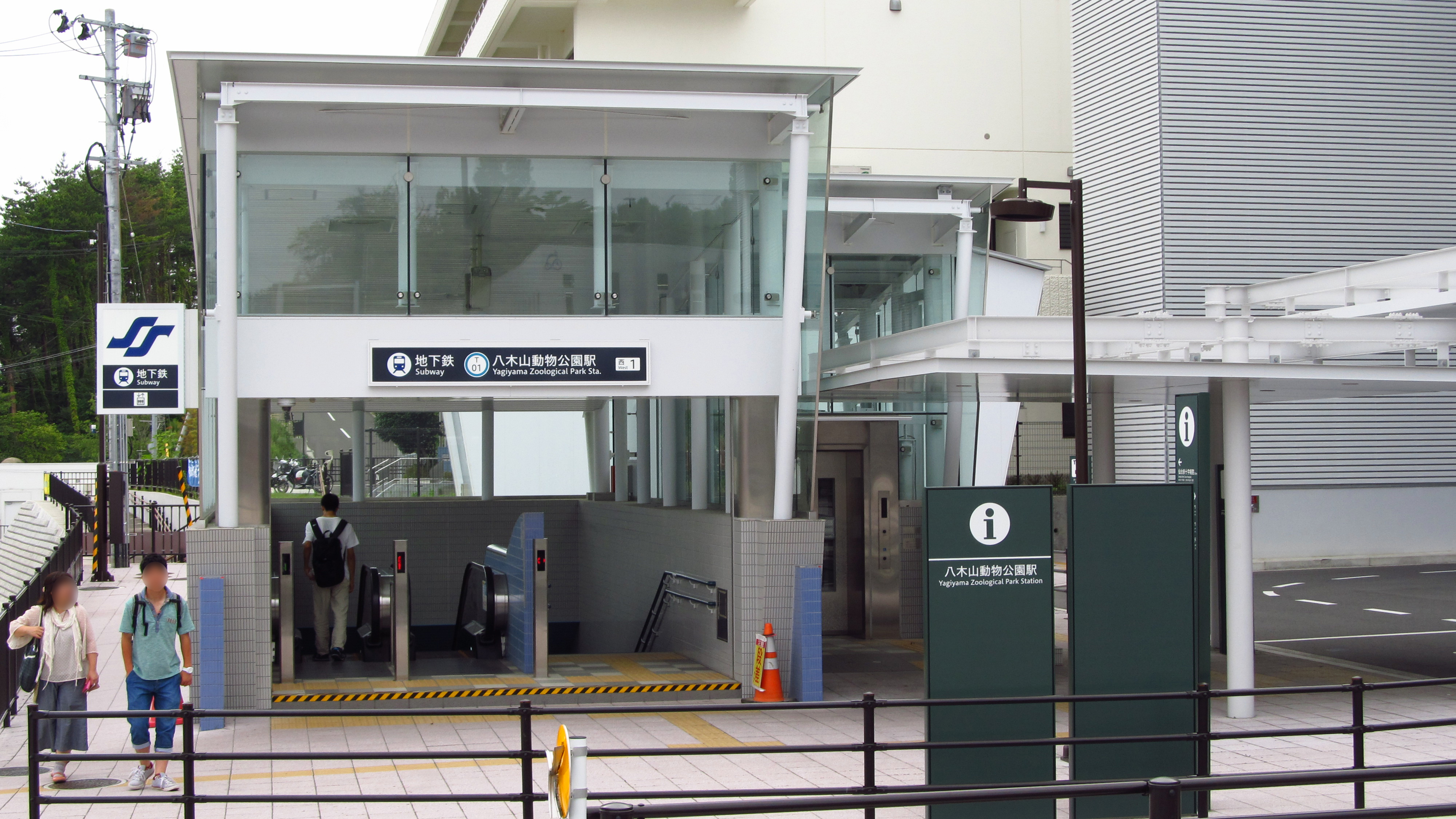
"West 1" entrance

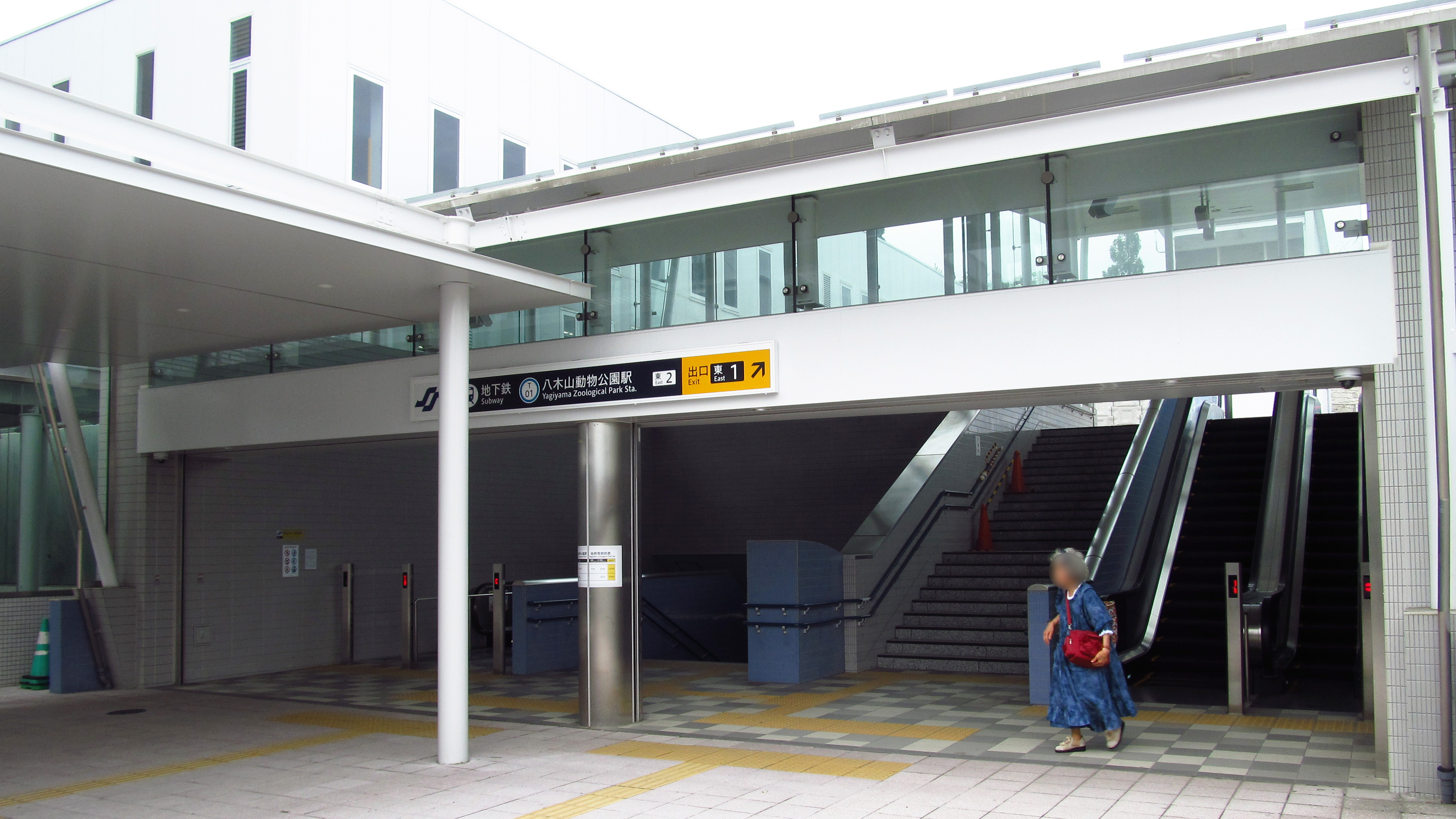
"East 2" entrance

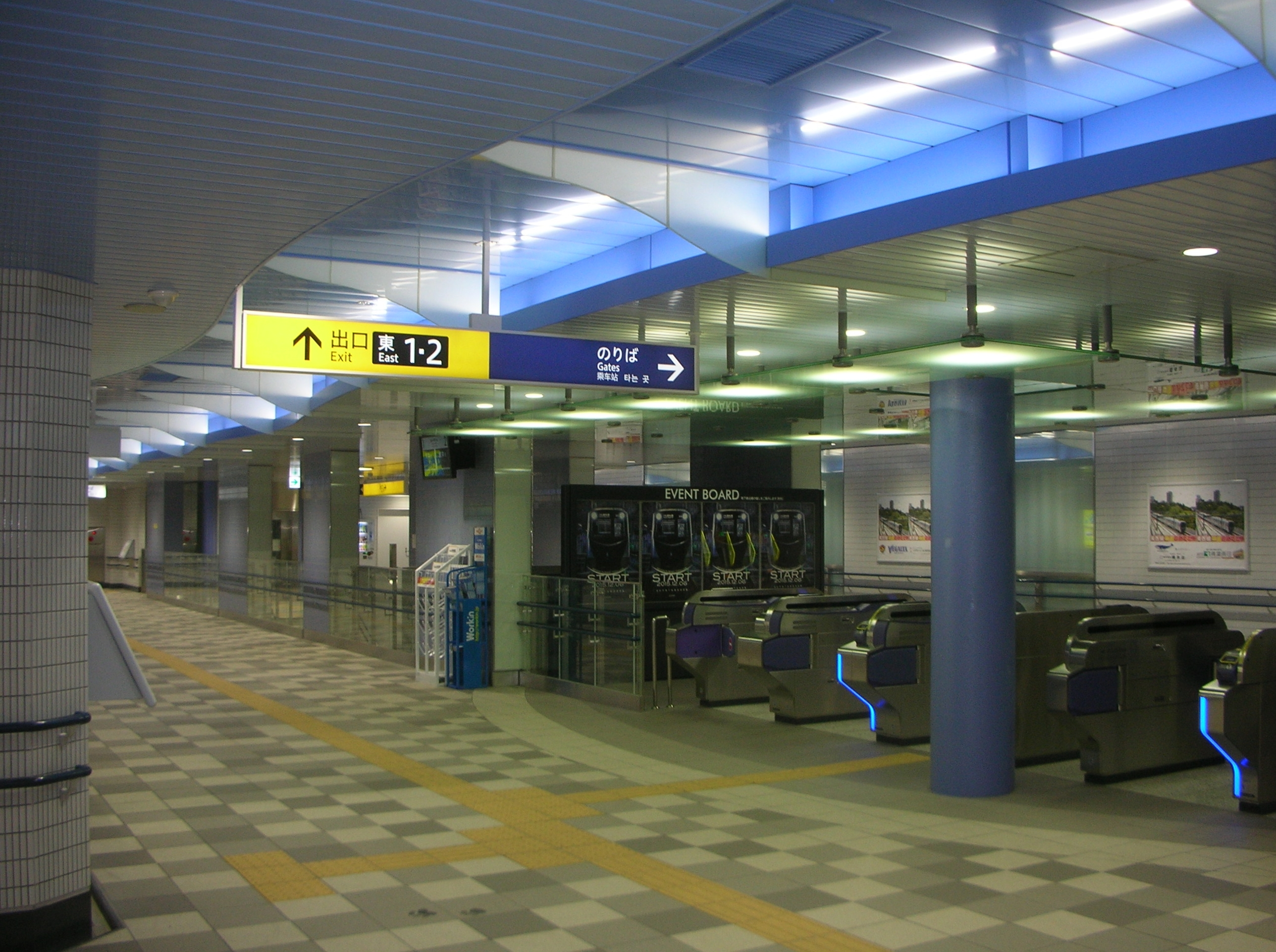
The ticket barriers in December 2015

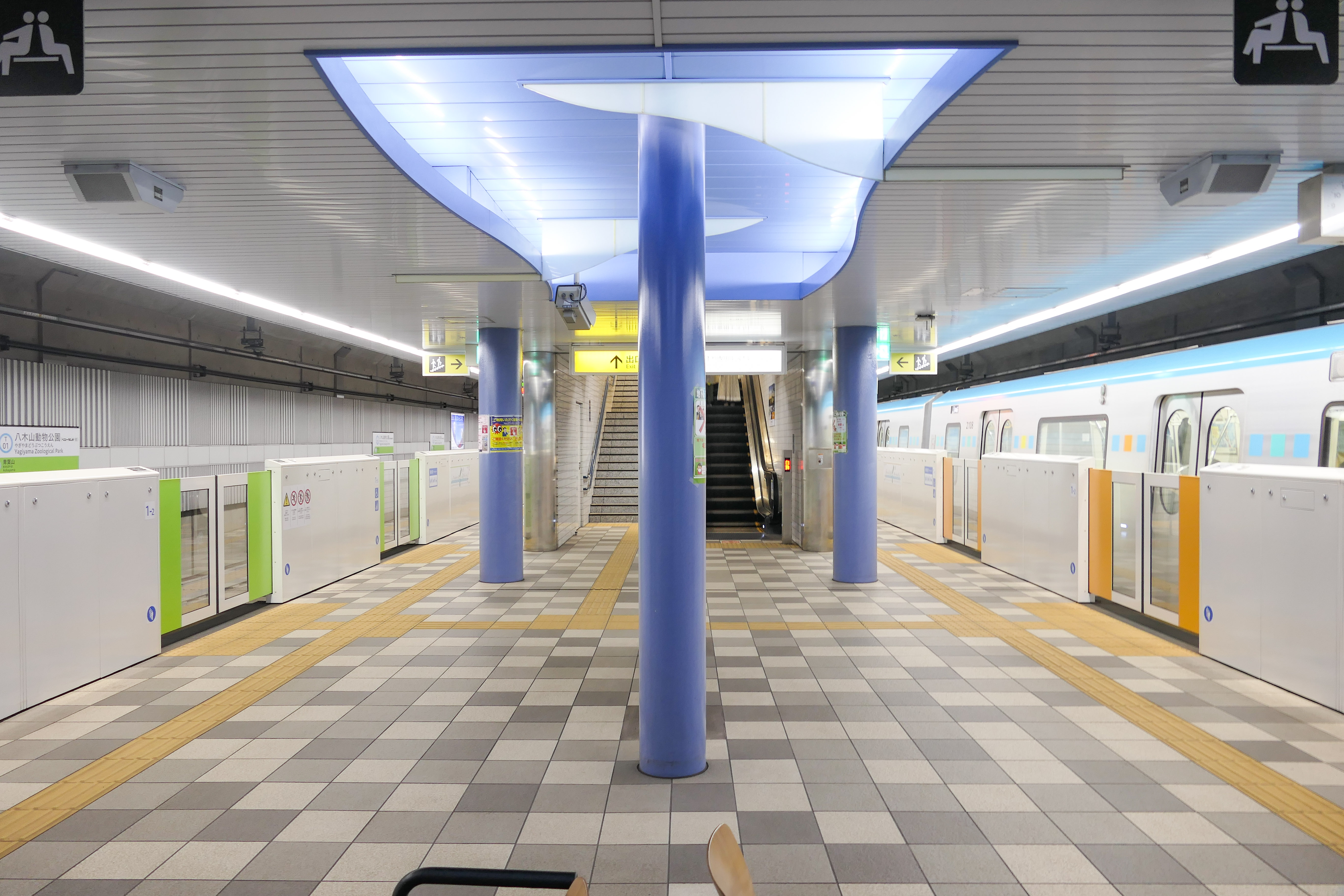
The platforms in June 2024

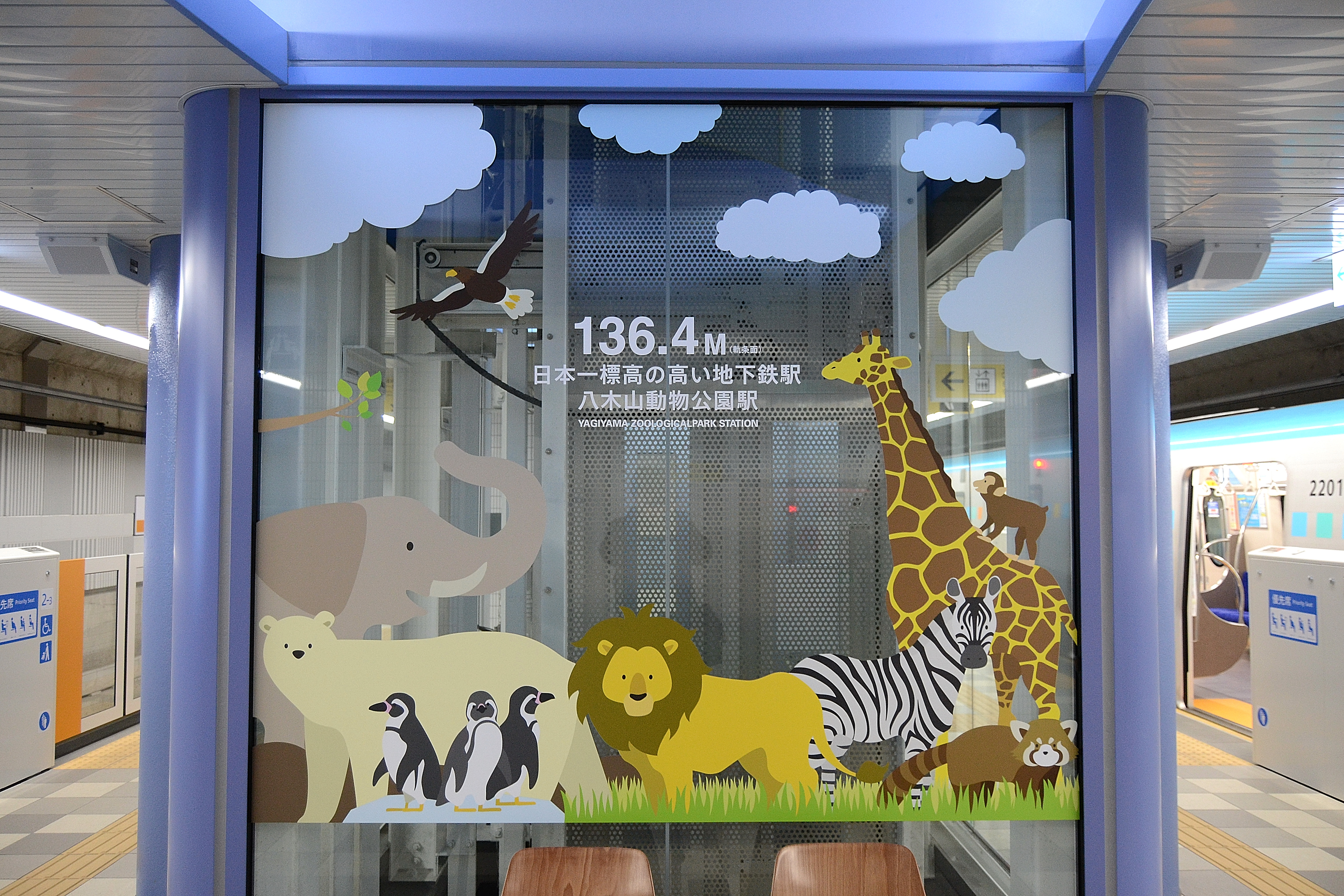
The sign on the platform marking the height of 136.4 m above sea level, December 2015

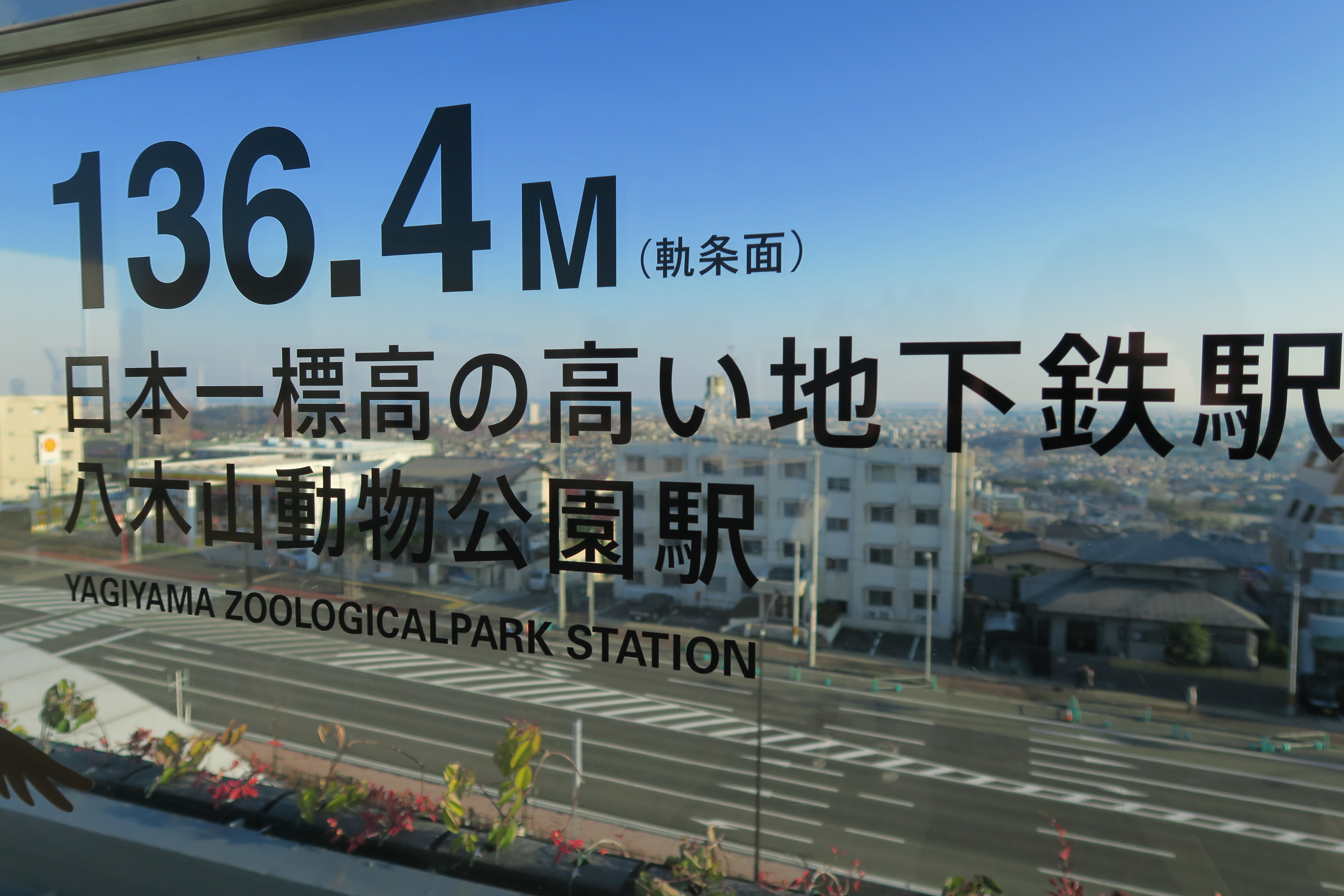
The sign marking the height of 136.4 m above sea level, December 2015

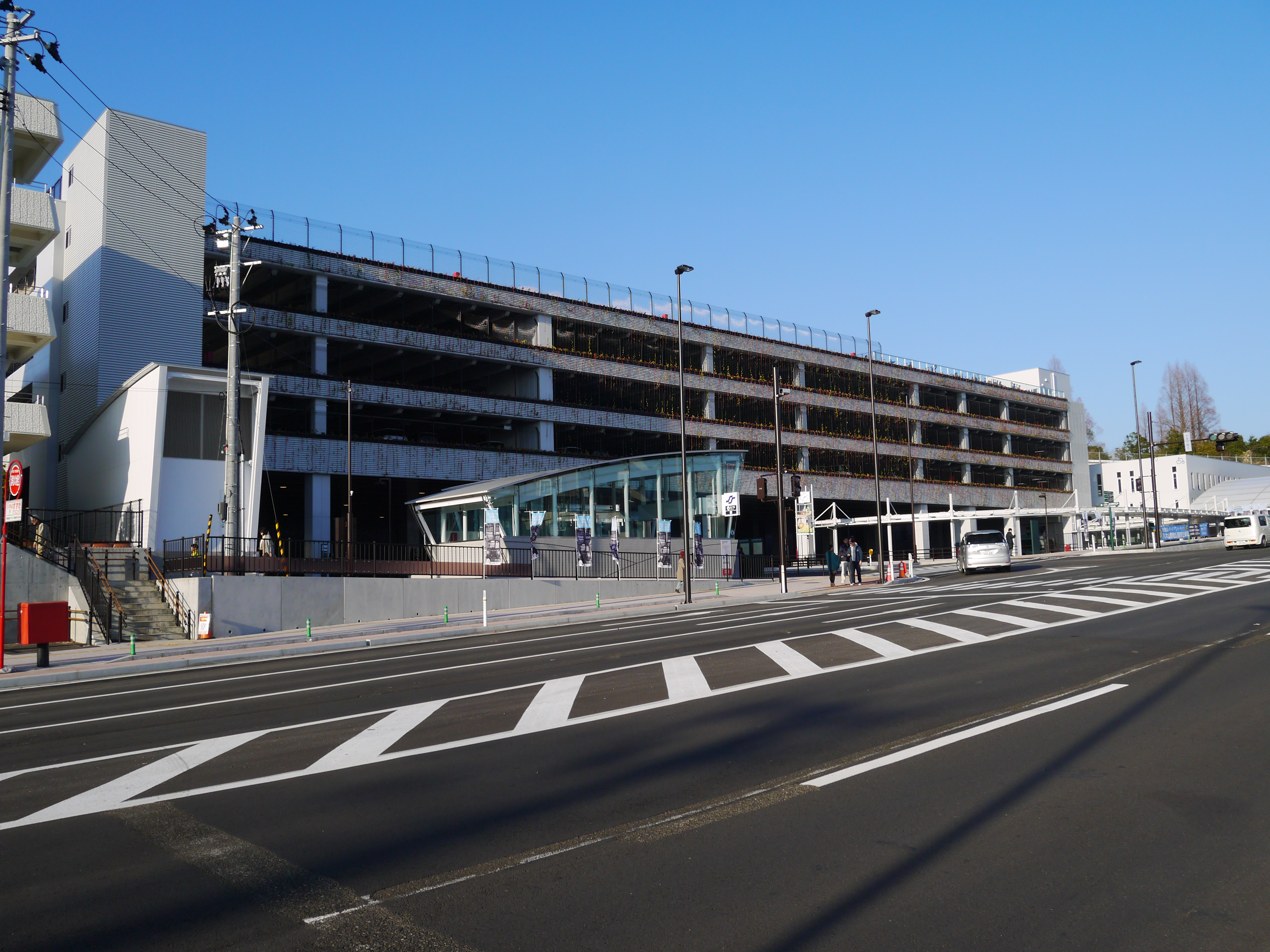
The multi-level station parking garage in December 2015

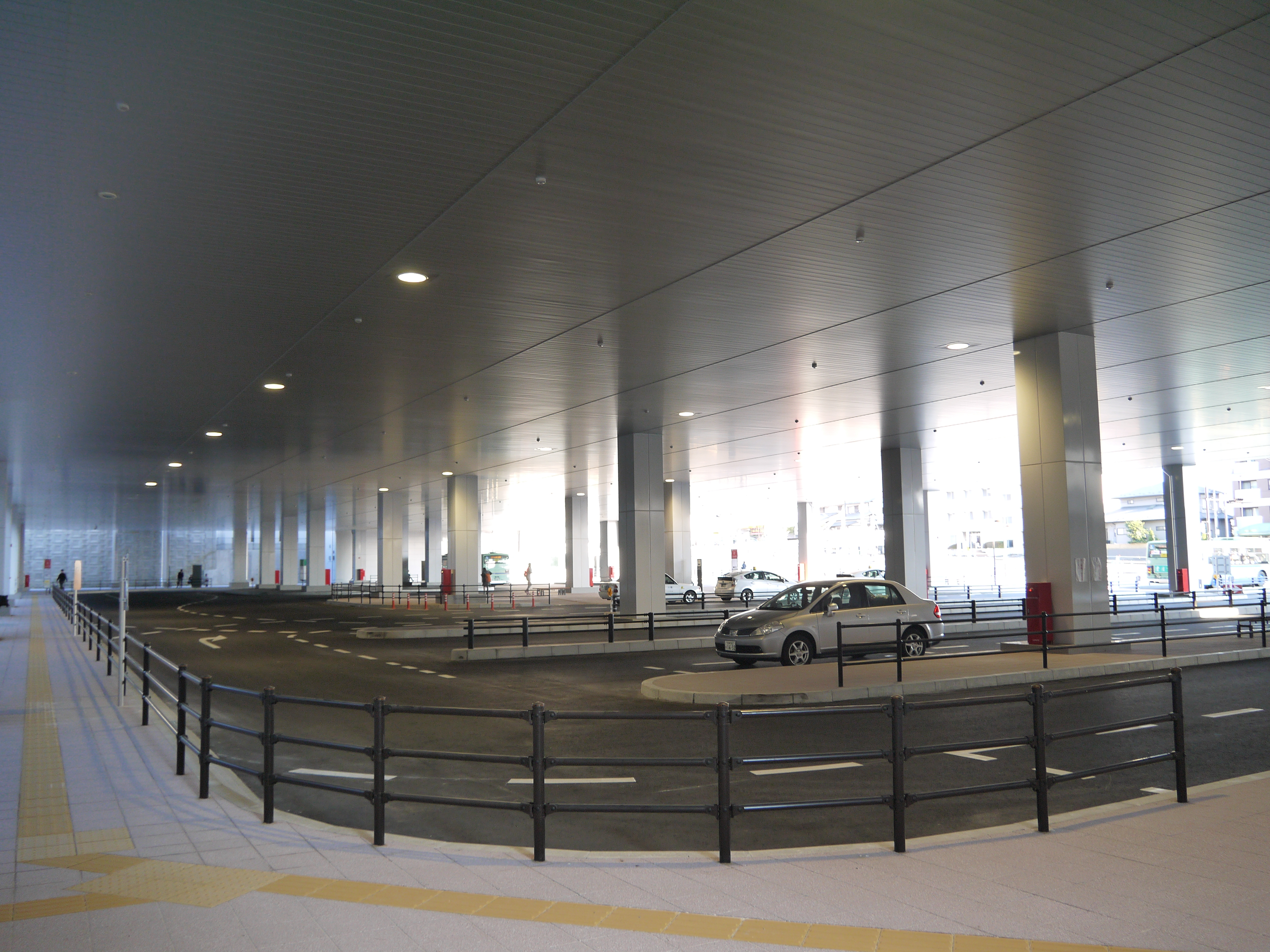
The car drop-off area and taxi pool in December 2015

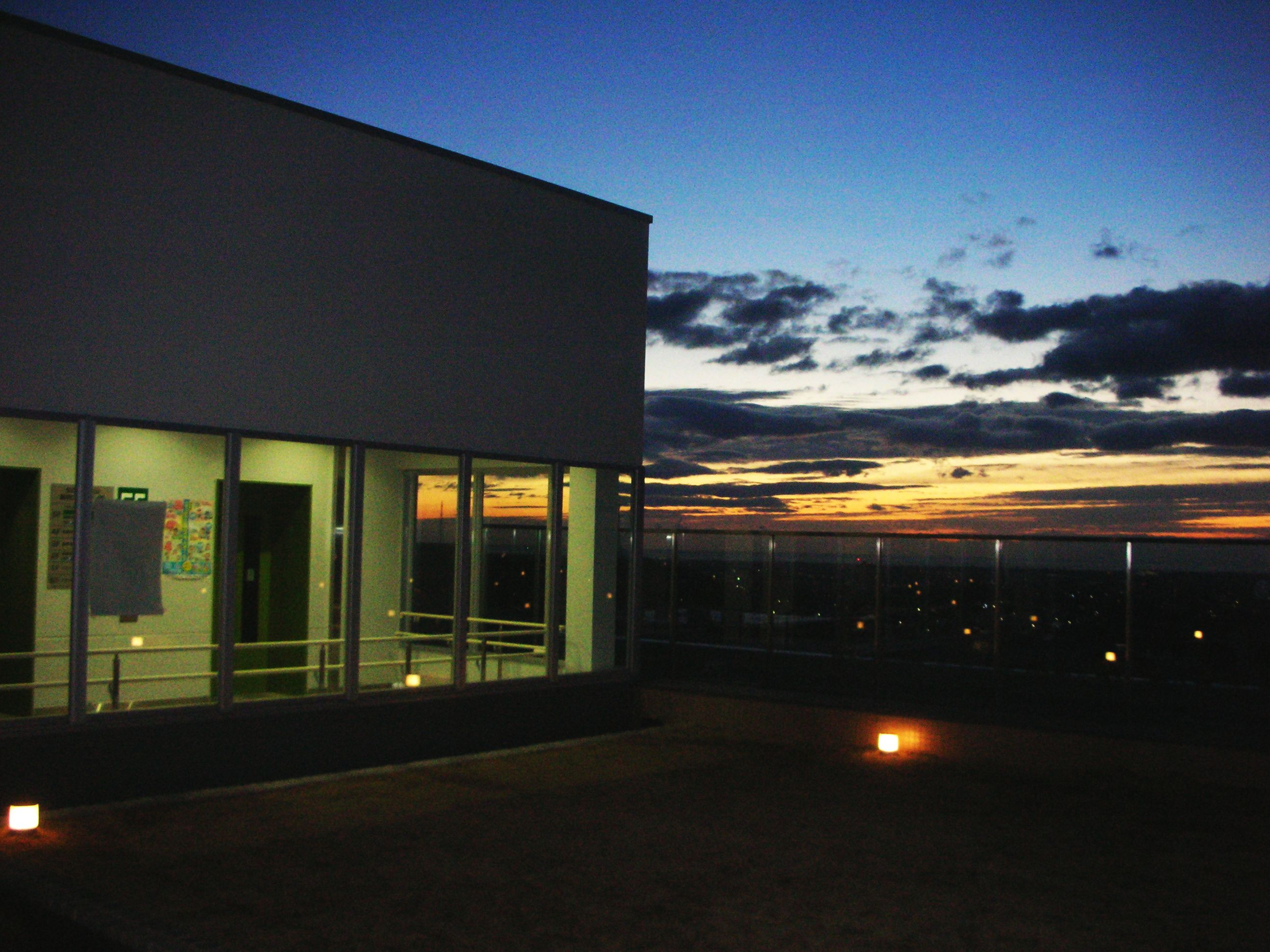
5th floor parking lot

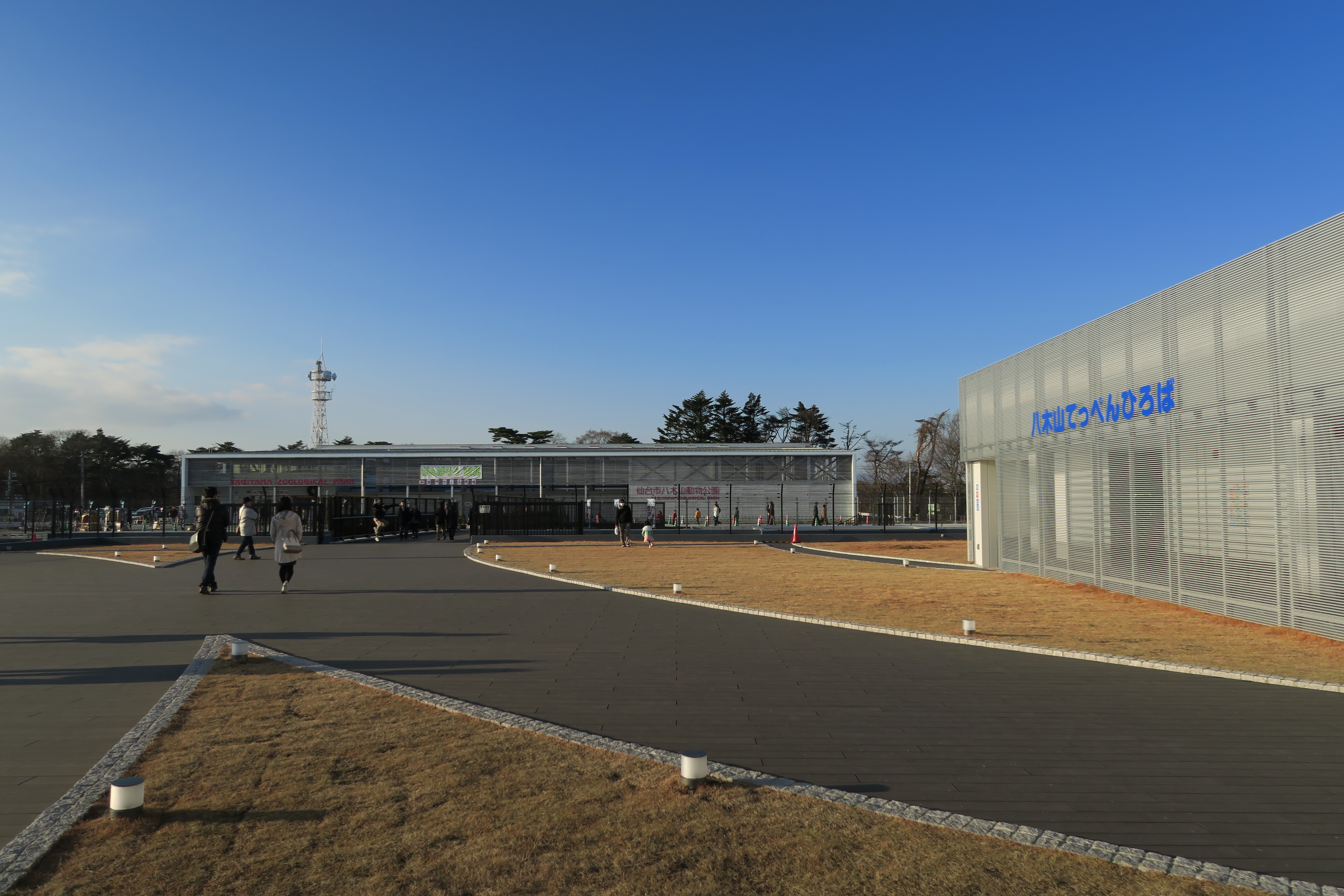
Yagiyama Teppen Hiroba Yagiyama Zoological Park Station

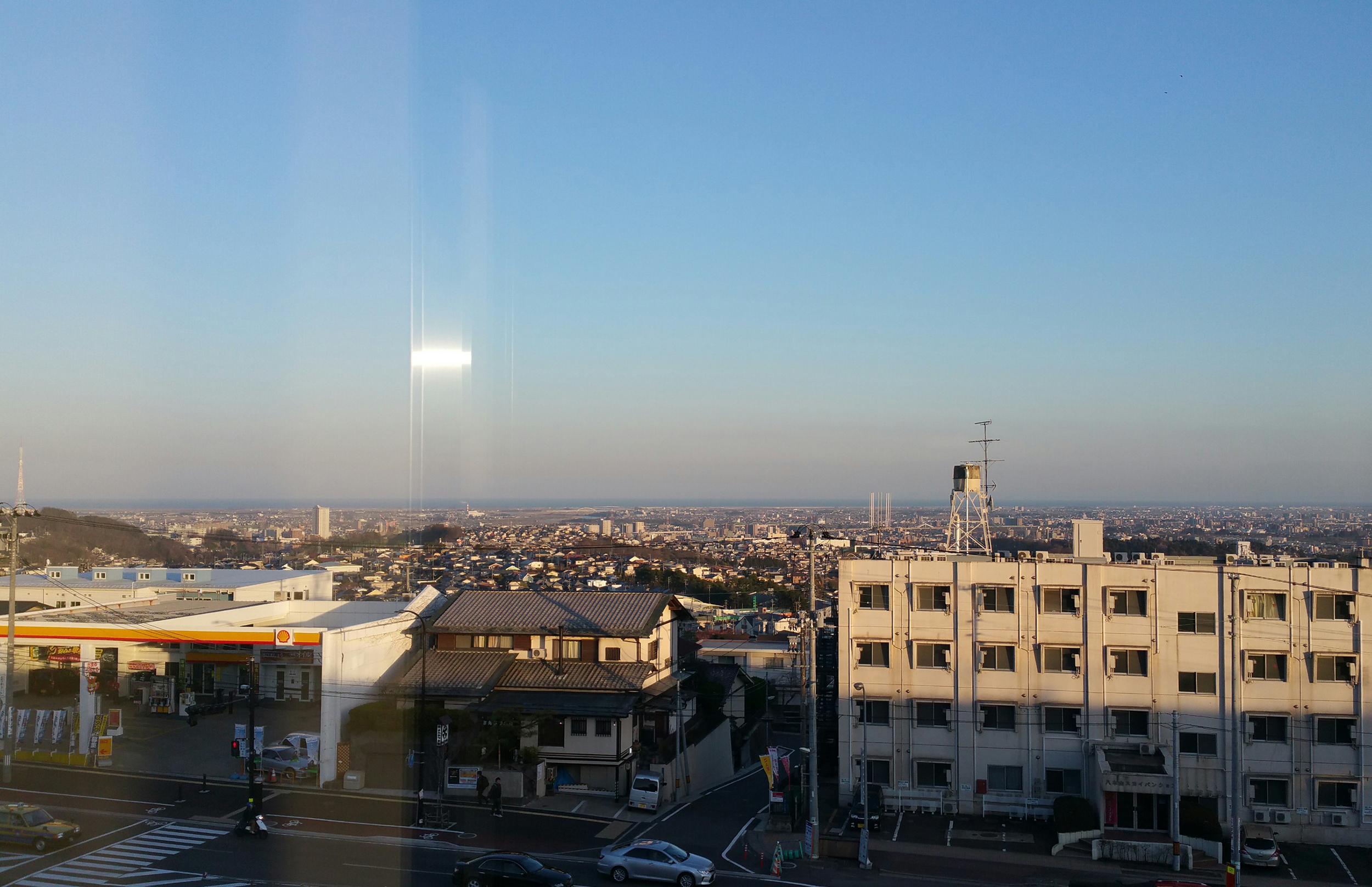
5th floor viewing area

== History ==
The station opened on 6 December 2015, coinciding with the opening of the Tōzai Line.

== Passenger statistics ==
In fiscal 2015, the station was used by an average of 4,451 passengers daily.

== Surrounding area ==
- Yagiyama Zoological Park
- Yagiyama Benyland amusement park
- Tohoku Institute of Technology Yagiyama Campus
- Sendai Johnan High School
- Research Institute for Electromagnetic Materials

== See also ==
- List of railway stations in Japan
