= Arai Station (Miyagi) =

Metro station in Sendai, Japan

T13 Arai Station 荒井駅
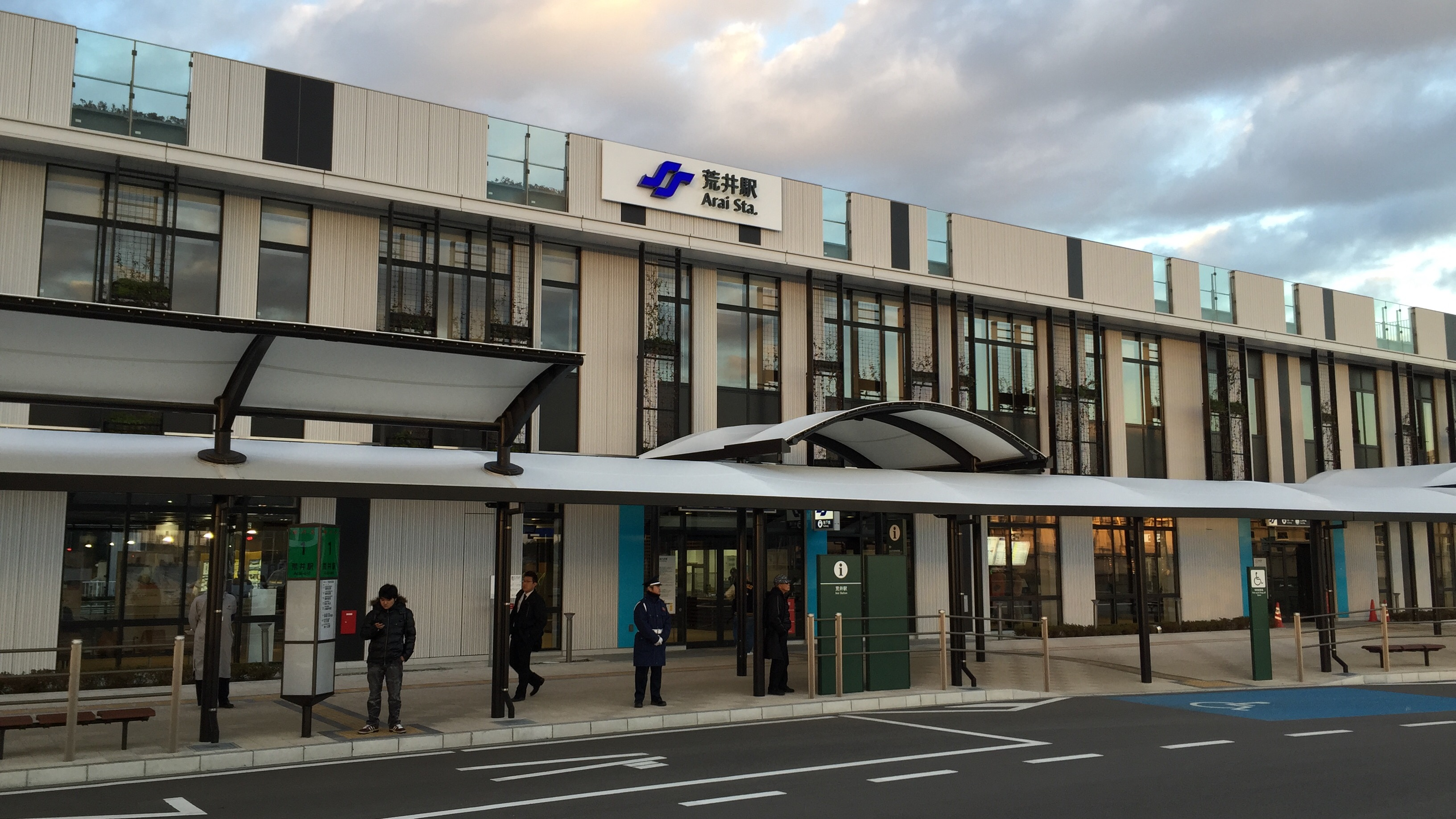
- The south side of the station in December 2015

General information
- Location: Wakabayashi-ku, Sendai-shi, Miyagi-ken 984-0032; Japan
- Coordinates: 38.2449°N 140.9486°E
- System: Sendai Subway station
- Operator: Sendai City Transportation Bureau
- Line: Tōzai Line
- Distance: 13.9 km (8.6 mi) from Yagiyama Zoological Park
- Platforms: 1 island platform
- Tracks: 2

Construction
- Structure type: Underground
- Accessible: Yes

Other information
- Status: Staffed
- Station code: T13
- Website: Official website

History
- Opened: 6 December 2015; 10 years ago

Passengers
- FY2015 (Daily): 2,254

Services
Preceding station	Sendai Subway	Following station
Rokuchonome T12 towards Yagiyama Zoological Park	Tōzai Line	Terminus
Location
- Location within Sendai Location within Miyagi Prefecture Location within Japan

Arai Station (荒井駅, Arai-eki) is a subway station on the Sendai Subway Tōzai Line in Wakabayashi-ku, Sendai, Japan, operated by the municipal subway operator Sendai City Transportation Bureau.

== Lines ==
Arai Station is served by the 13.9 km (8.6 mi) Sendai Subway Tōzai Line, and forms the eastern terminus of the line. The station is numbered "T13".

== Station layout ==
The station has one island platform serving two tracks on the basement ("B1F") level. The ticket barriers are located on the ground floor ("1F") level.

=== Platforms ===
1	■ Tōzai Line	■ Arriving trains only
2	■ Tōzai Line	■ for Sendai and Yagiyama Zoological Park

== Gallery ==
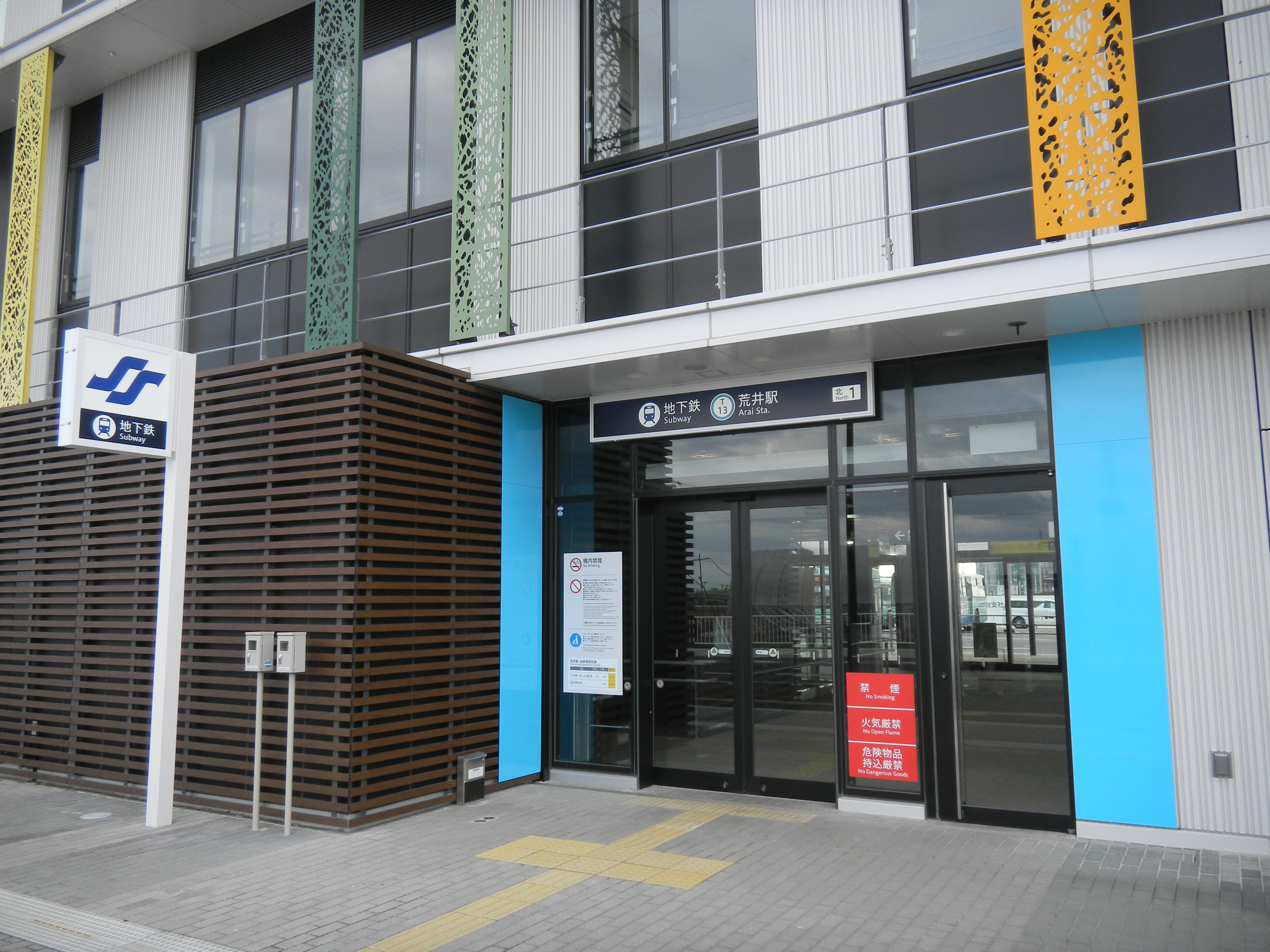
Arai station “North 1” entrance

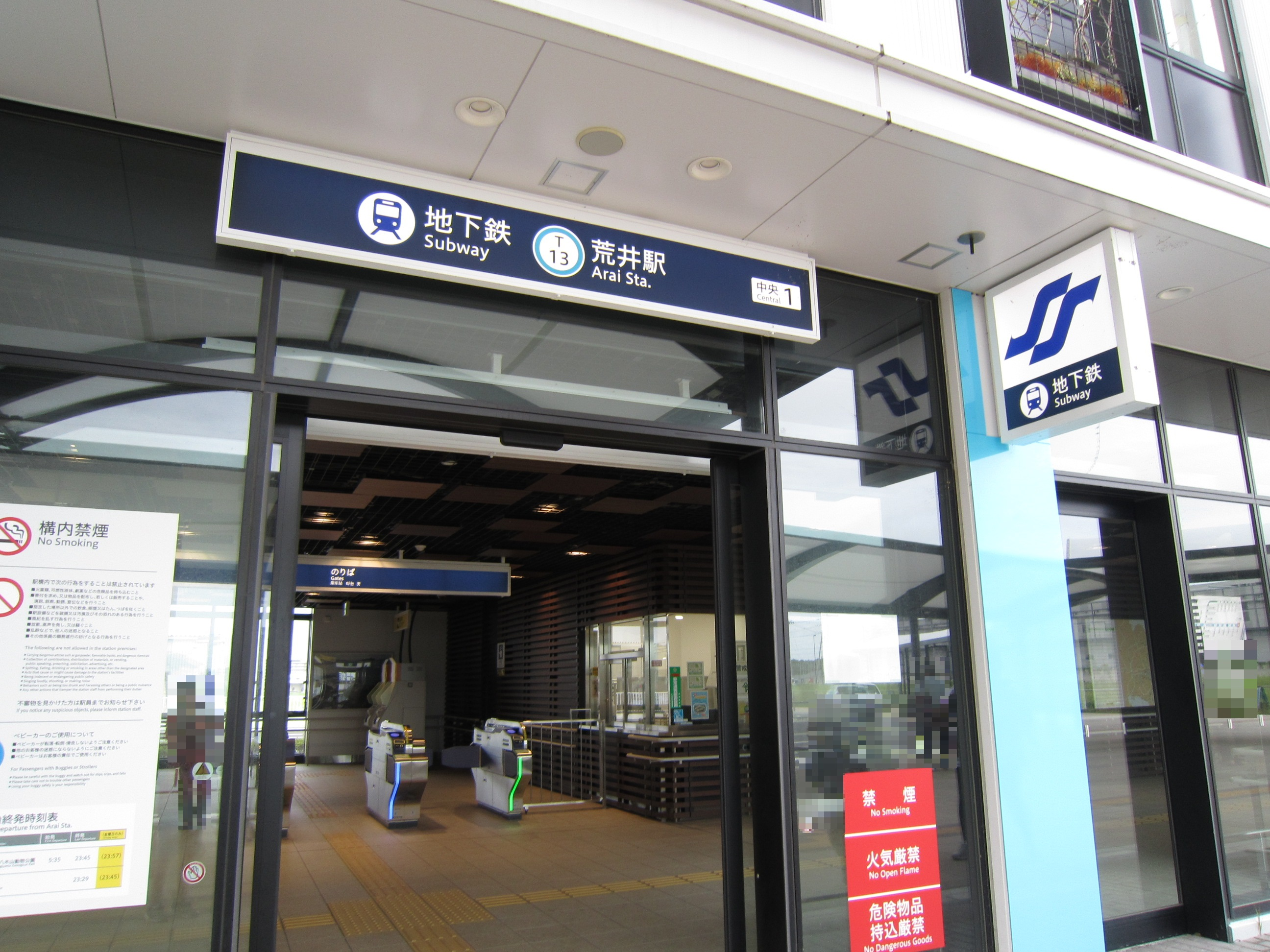
Arai station “Central 1” entrance

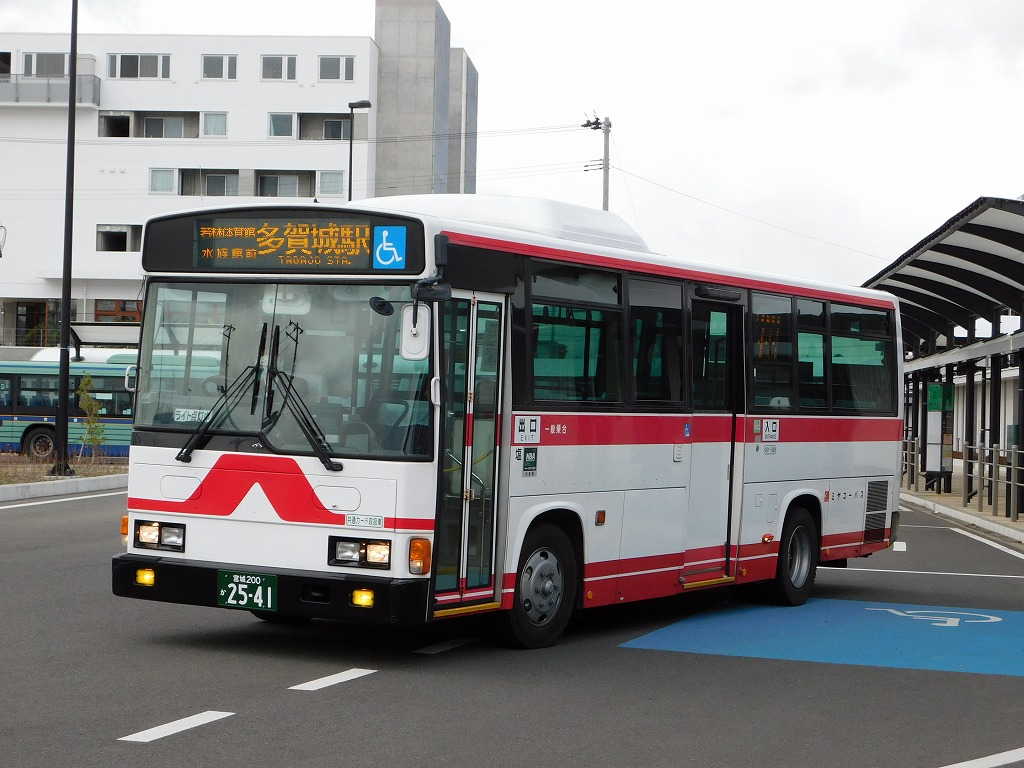
Miyako bus at Arai station

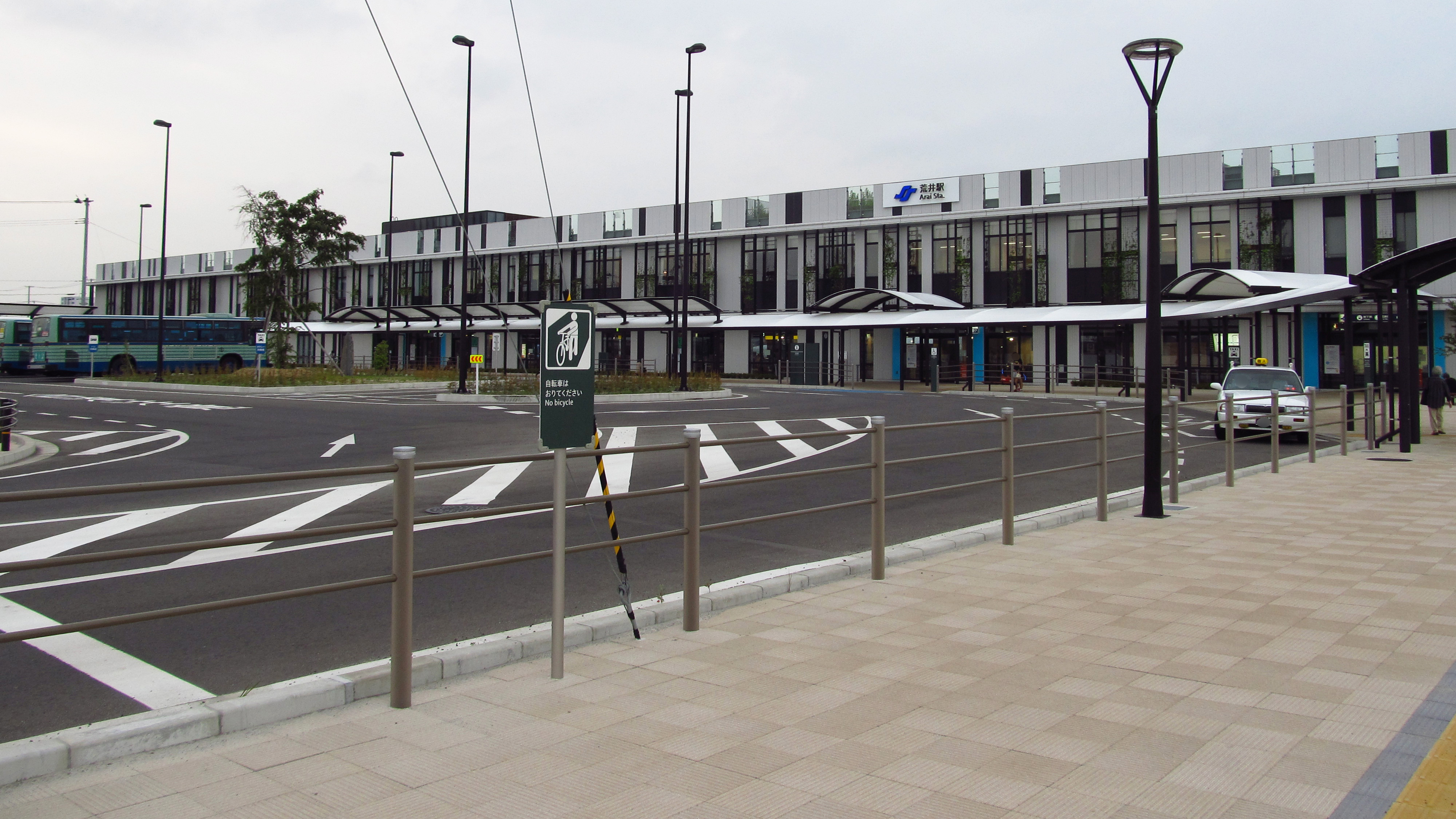
South side of Arai station headhouse

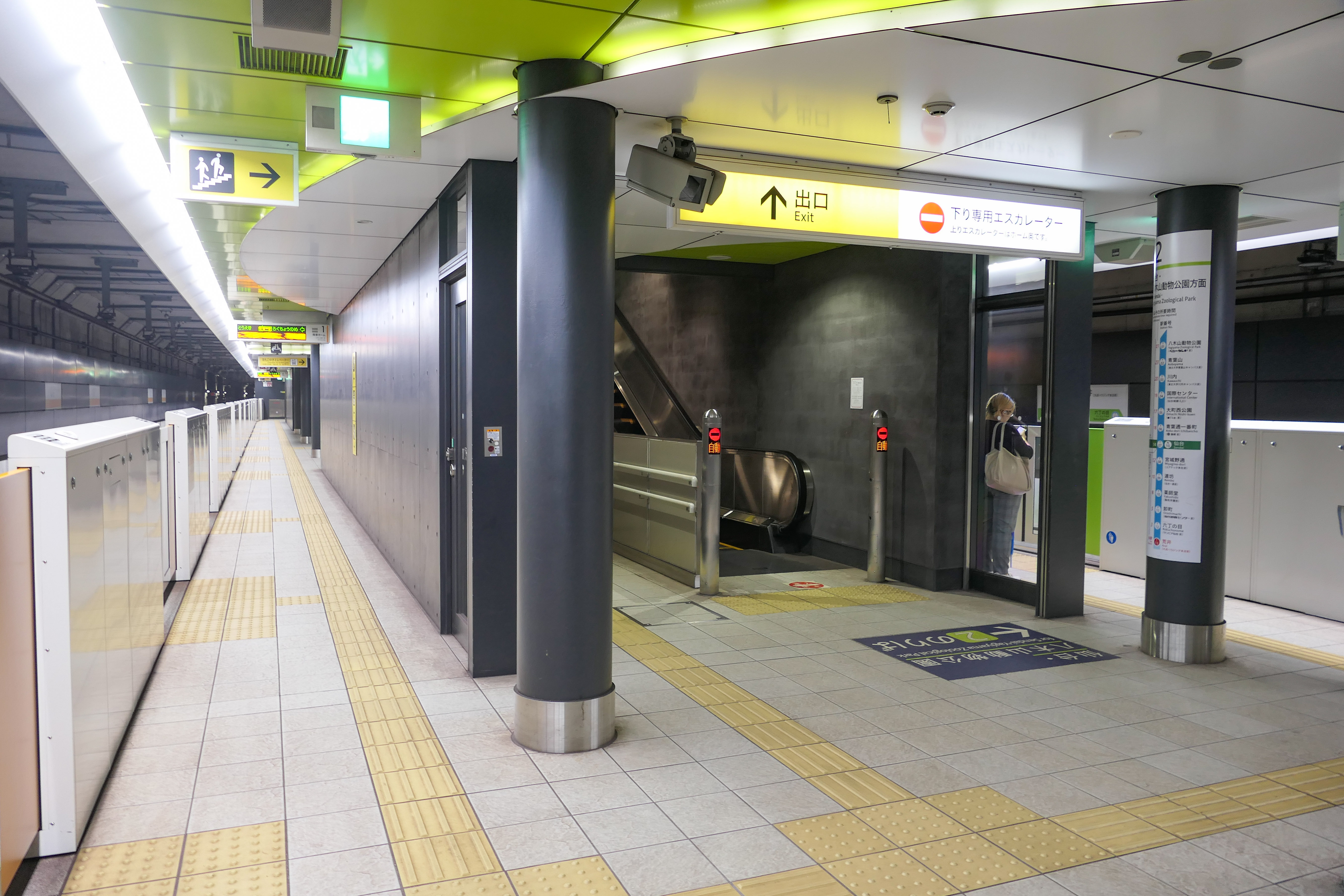
Arai station platform

== History ==
The station opened on 6 December 2015, coinciding with the opening of the Tōzai Line.

== Passenger statistics ==
In fiscal 2015, the station was used by an average of 2,254 passengers daily.

== Surrounding area ==
- Arai Depot
- Sendai Shichigo Junior High School
- Sendai Shichigo Elementary School
- Sendai GIGS
- Wakabayashi Police station

== See also ==
- List of railway stations in Japan
