= Sendai City Transportation Bureau =

Coordinates: 38°16′9.4″N 140°51′45.32″E

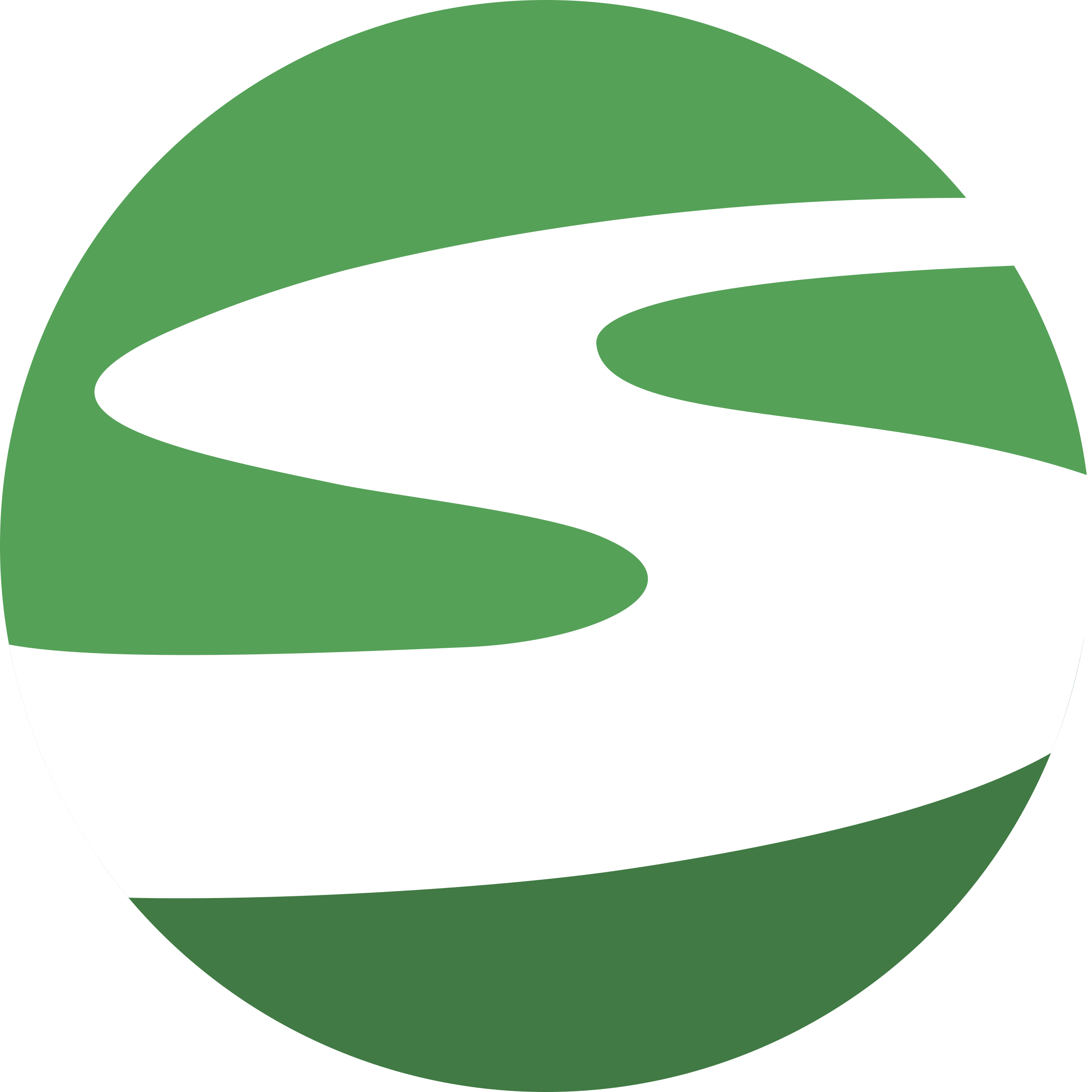

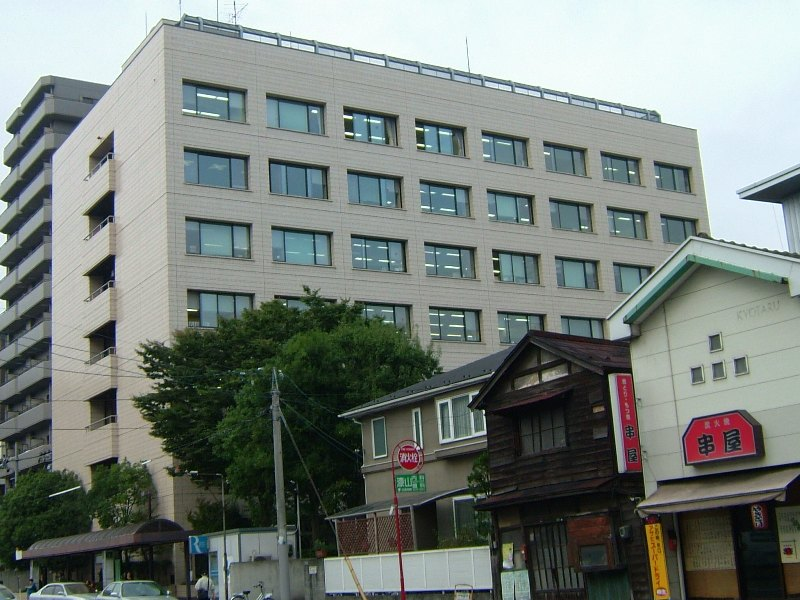
- Sendai City Transportation Bureau headquarters
- Native name: 仙台市交通局
- Romanized name: Sendai-shi Kōtsūkyoku
- Company type: Transportation authority
- Industry: Transportation
- Founded: 25 November 1926
- Headquarters: Aoba-ku, Sendai, Japan
- Website: Official website

Sendai City Transportation Bureau (仙台市交通局, Sendai-shi Kōtsūkyoku) is a public transport organization in Sendai, Japan. The organization operates subways and buses within the city. It was founded in 1926.

== Transport ==
- Sendai City Bus
  - Sendai Airport bus (Discontinued in 2007)
  - Loople Sendai (A circle line for tourists)
- Sendai Subway
  - Namboku Line
  - Tōzai Line
- Sendai City Tram (Discontinued in 1976)
