= Kawauchi Station =

Kawauchi Station may refer to one of the following railway stations in Japan:

- Kawauchi Station (Iwate) on the Yamada Line
- Kawauchi Station (Miyagi) on the Sendai Subway Tozai Line
