= Aoba-dori Ichibancho Station =

Metro station in Sendai, Japan

T06 Aoba-dori Ichibancho Station 青葉通一番町駅
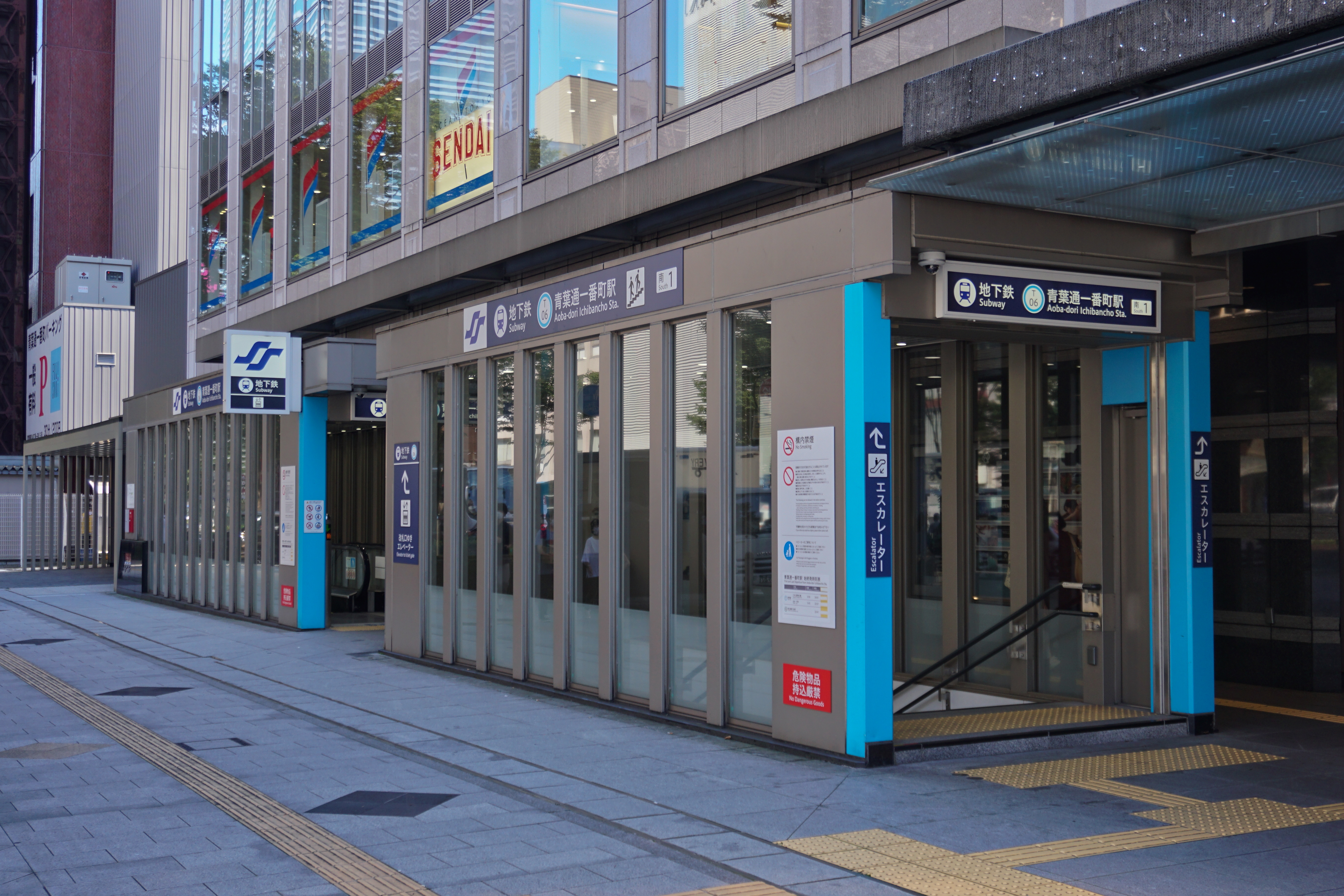
- “South 1” entrance

General information
- Location: 3-3-2 Ichibanchō, Aoba-ku, Sendai-shi, Miyagi-ken 980-0811; Japan
- Coordinates: 38.2597°N 140.8722°E
- System: Sendai Subway station
- Operator: Sendai City Transportation Bureau
- Line: Tōzai Line
- Distance: 5.7 km (3.5 mi) from Yagiyama Zoological Park
- Platforms: 1 island platform
- Tracks: 2

Construction
- Structure type: Underground
- Accessible: Yes

Other information
- Status: Staffed
- Station code: T06
- Website: Official website

History
- Opened: 6 December 2015; 10 years ago

Passengers
- FY2015: 5,303 daily

Services
Preceding station	Sendai Subway	Following station
Omachi Nishi-koen T05 towards Yagiyama Zoological Park	Tōzai Line	Sendai T07 towards Arai
Location
- Location within Miyagi Prefecture

Aoba-dori Ichibancho Station (青葉通一番町駅, Aoba-dōri Ichibanchō-eki) is a subway station on the Sendai Subway Tōzai Line in Aoba-ku, Sendai, Japan, operated by the municipal subway operator Sendai City Transportation Bureau.

== Lines ==
Aoba-dori Ichibancho Station is served by the 13.9 km (8.6 mi) Sendai Subway Tōzai Line between Yagiyama Zoological Park and Arai, and is located 5.7 km (3.5 mi) from the western terminus of the line at Yagiyama Zoological Park Station. The station is numbered "T06".

== Station layout ==
The station has one island platform serving two tracks on the third basement ("B3F") level. The ticket barriers are located on the second basement ("B2F") level.

=== Platforms ===
1	■ Tōzai Line	■ for Sendai and Arai
2	■ Tōzai Line	■ for Yagiyama Zoological Park

== Gallery ==
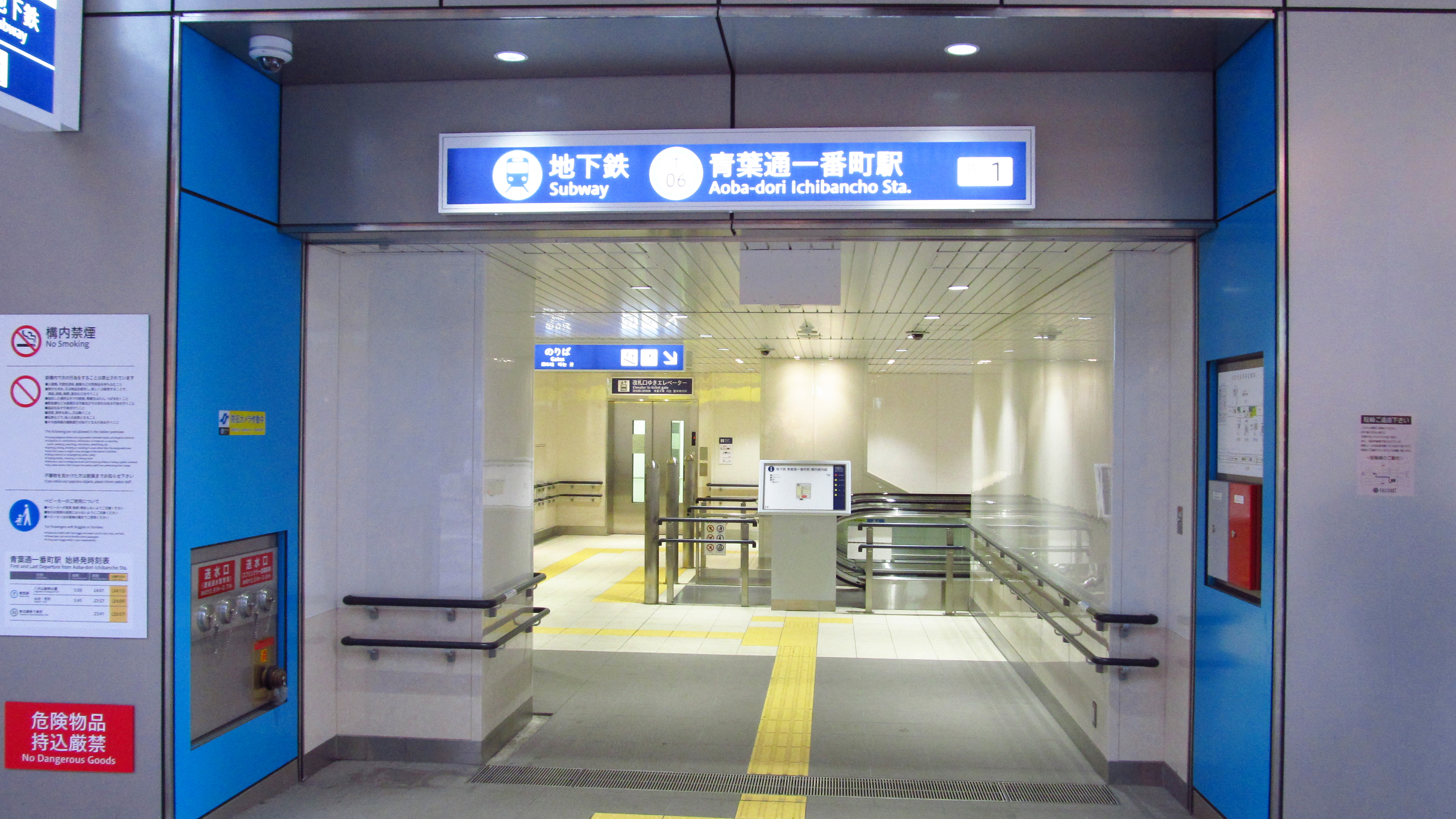
“North 1” entrance

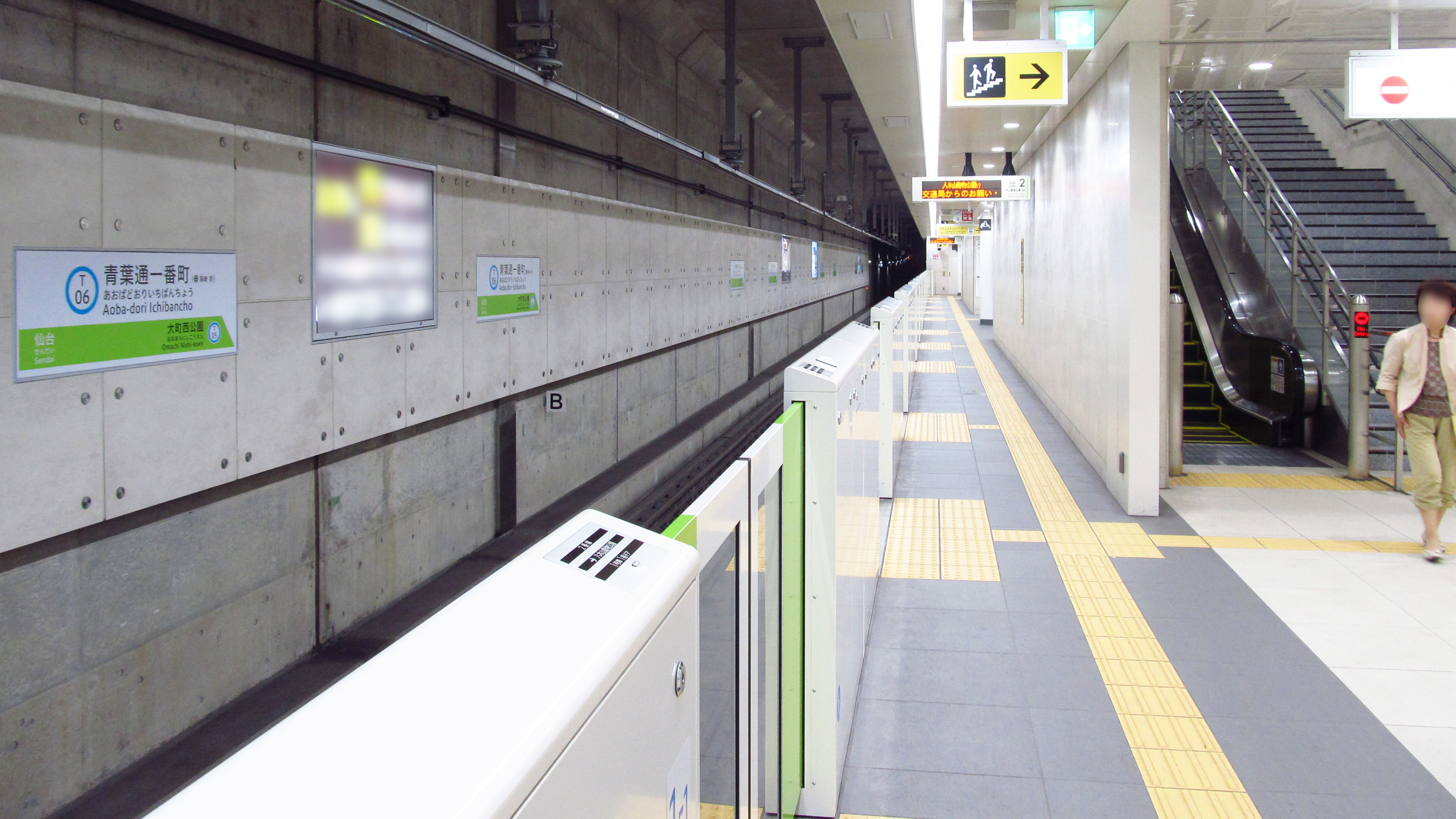
Station platform

== Staffing ==
The station is staffed and operated by sub-contracted employees from the security company Alsok.

== History ==
The station opened on 6 December 2015, coinciding with the opening of the Tōzai Line.

== Passenger statistics ==
In fiscal 2015, the station was used by an average of 5,303 passengers daily.

== Surrounding area ==
- Tohoku University Katahira Campus

== See also ==
- List of railway stations in Japan
