= International Center Station =

Metro station in Sendai, Japan

T04 International Center Station 国際センター駅
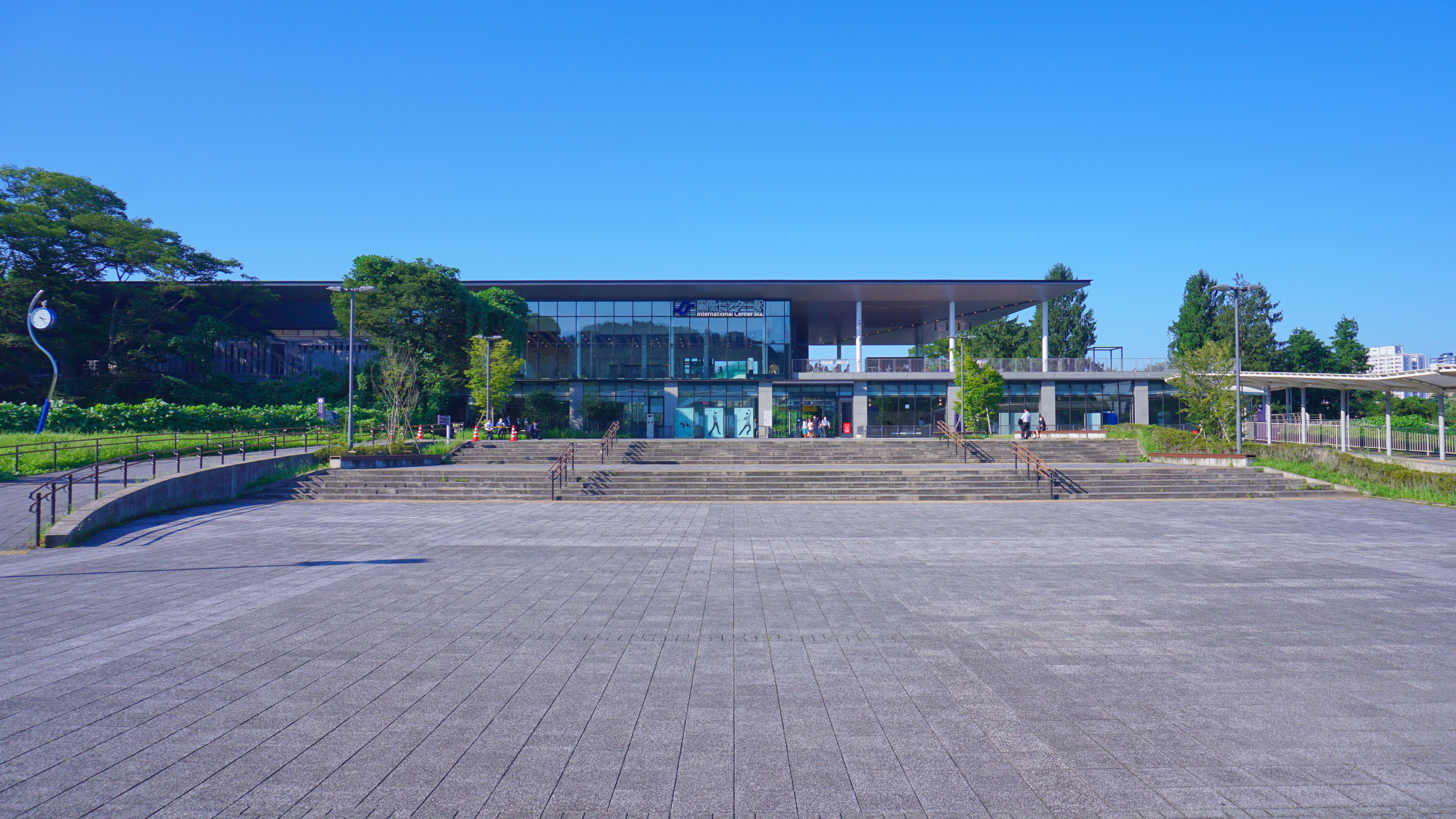
- South forecourt photographed in September 2022

General information
- Location: 2-1 Aobayama, Aoba-ku, Sendai-shi, Miyagi-ken 980-0856; Japan
- Coordinates: 38.2602°N 140.8569°E
- System: Sendai Subway station
- Operator: Sendai City Transportation Bureau
- Line: Tōzai Line
- Distance: 4.3 km (2.7 mi) from Yagiyama Zoological Park
- Platforms: 1 island platform
- Tracks: 2

Construction
- Structure type: Underground
- Accessible: Yes

Other information
- Status: Staffed
- Station code: T04
- Website: Official website

History
- Opened: 6 December 2015; 10 years ago

Passengers
- FY2015: 2,533 daily

Services
| Preceding station | Sendai Subway | Following station |
|---|---|---|
| Kawauchi T03 towards Yagiyama Zoological Park | Tōzai Line | Omachi Nishi-koen T05 towards Arai |
Location
- Location within Miyagi Prefecture

International Center Station (国際センター駅, Kokusai Sentā-eki) is a subway station on the Sendai Subway Tozai Line in Aoba-ku, Sendai, Japan, operated by the municipal subway operator Sendai City Transportation Bureau.

== Lines ==
International Center Station is served by the 13.9 km (8.6 mi) Sendai Subway Tōzai Line between Yagiyama Zoological Park and Arai, and is located 4.3 km (2.7 mi) from the western terminus of the line at Yagiyama Zoological Park Station. The station is numbered "T04".

== Station layout ==
The station has one island platform serving two tracks on the basement ("B1F") level. The ticket barriers are located on the ground floor ("1F") level.

=== Platforms ===
| 1 | ■ Tōzai Line | ■ for Sendai and Arai |
| 2 | ■ Tōzai Line | ■ for Yagiyama Zoological Park |

== Gallery ==
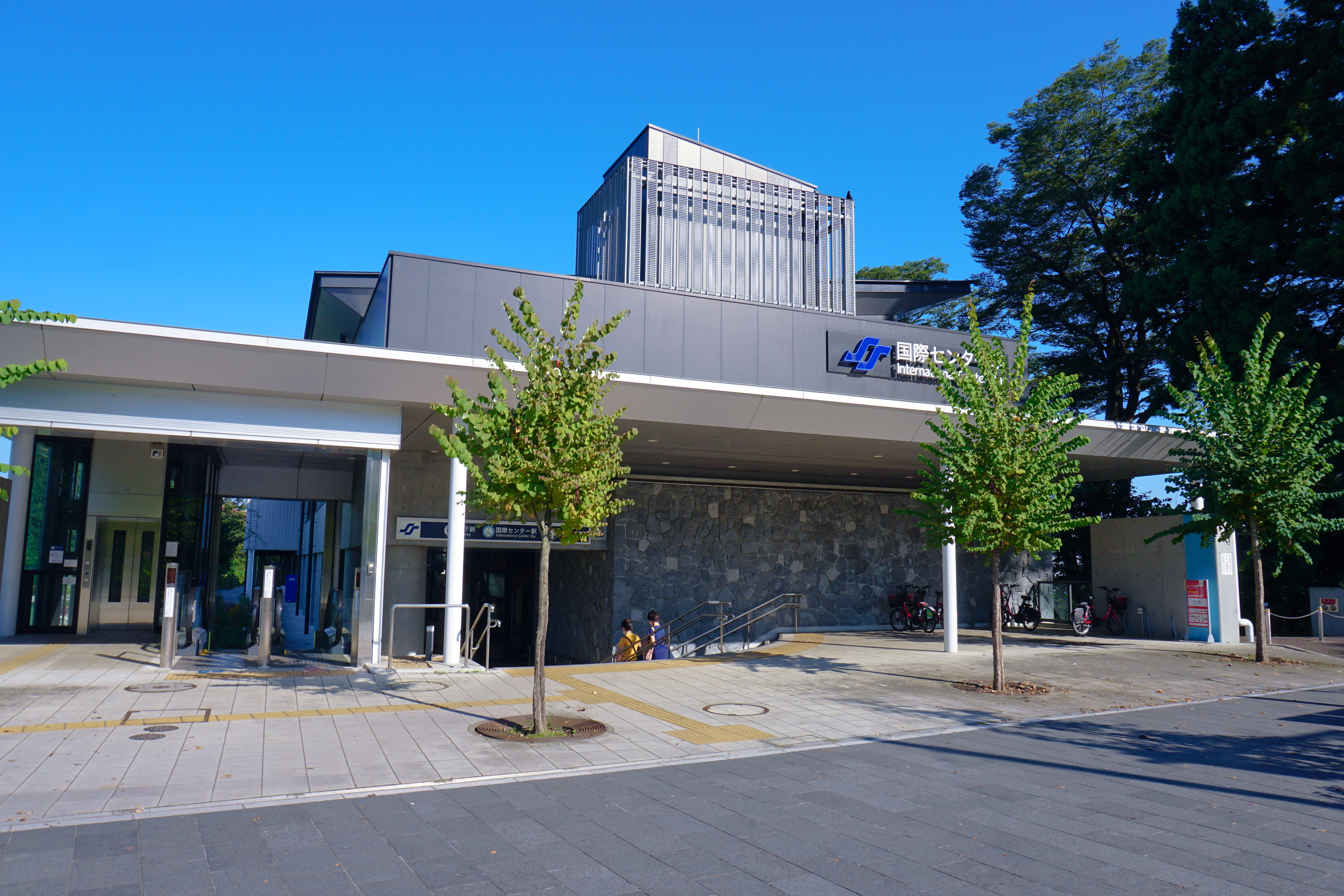
The "West 1" entrance in September 2022

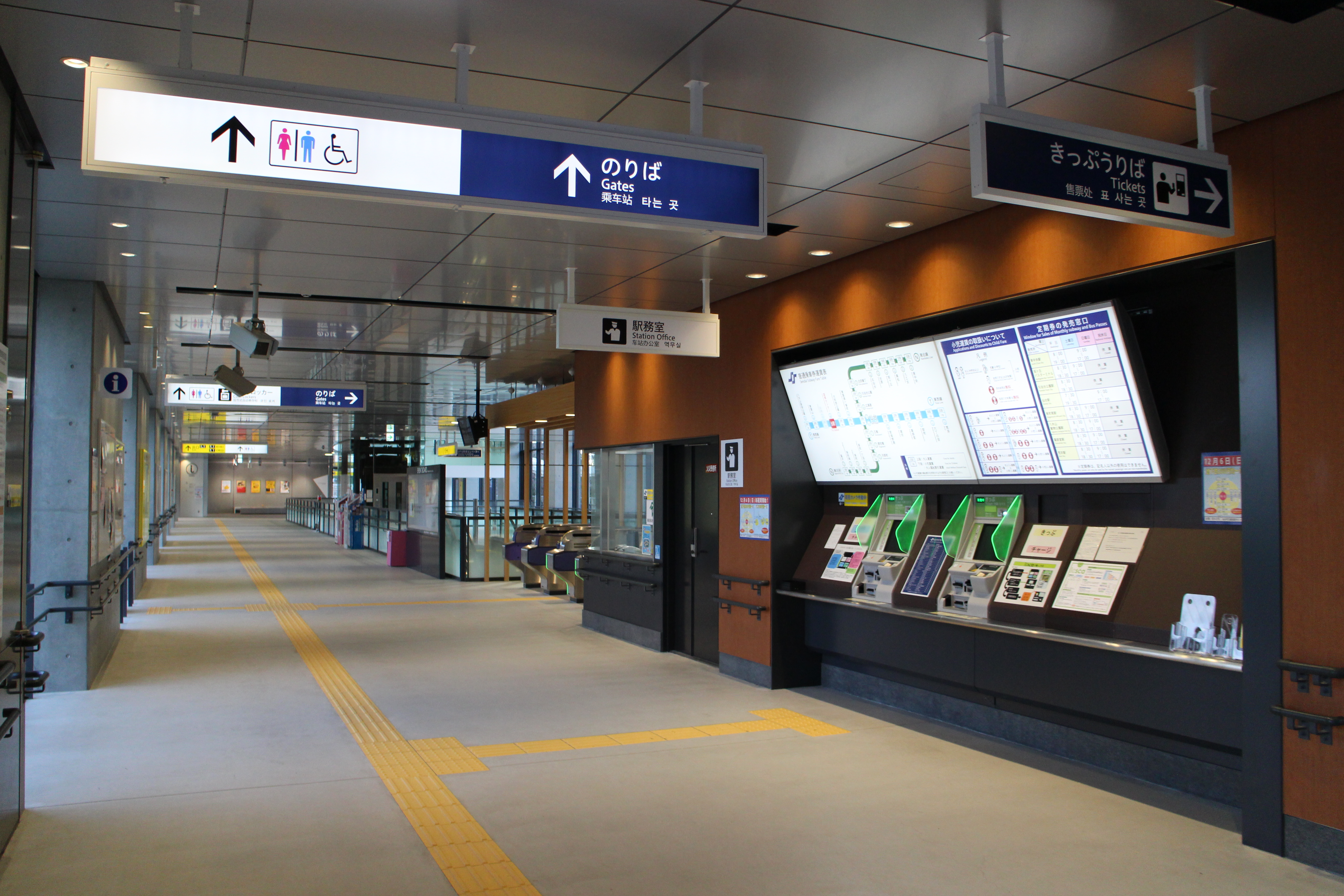
The ticket machines and ticket barriers on the ground floor level in January 2016

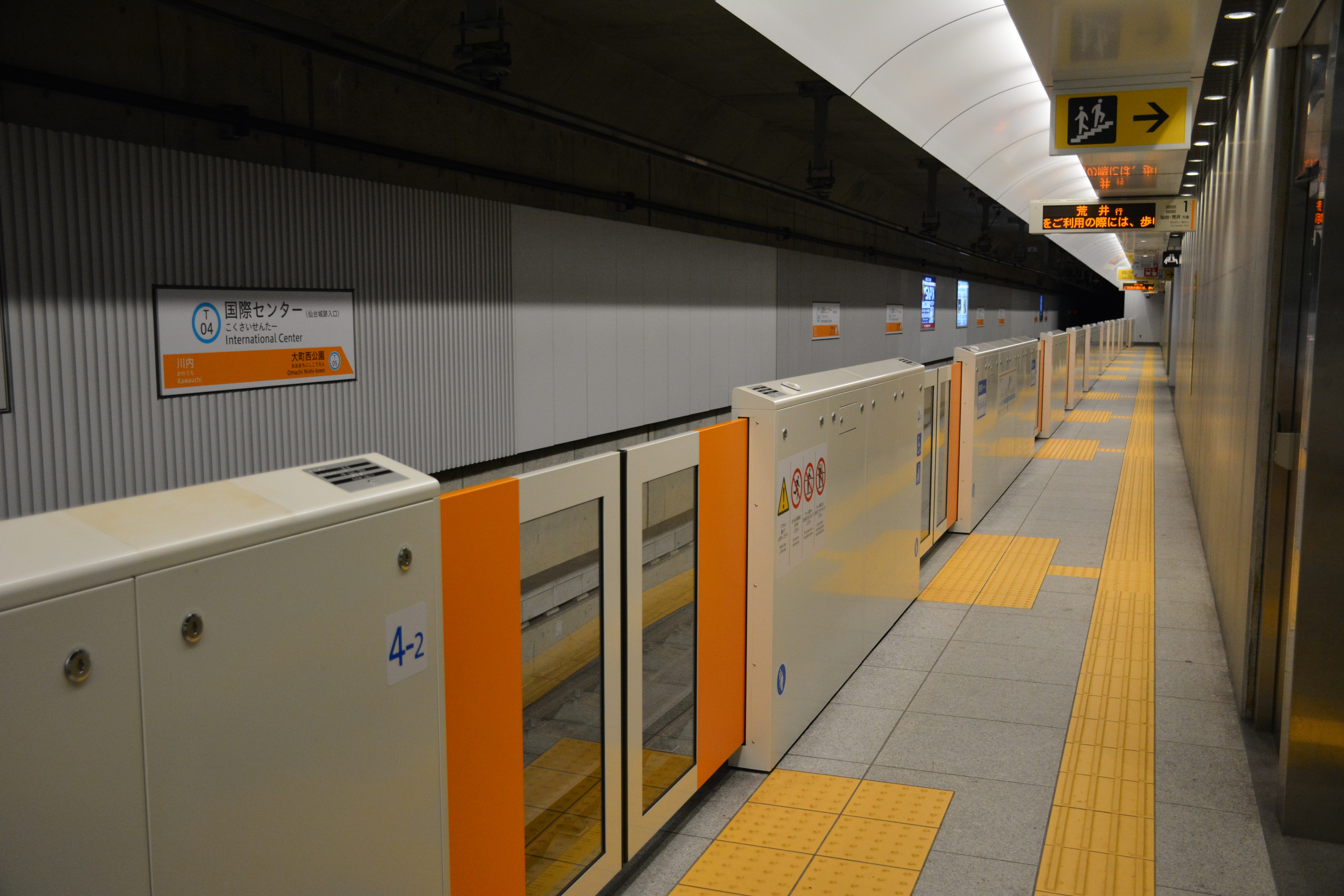
Platform 1 in October 2016

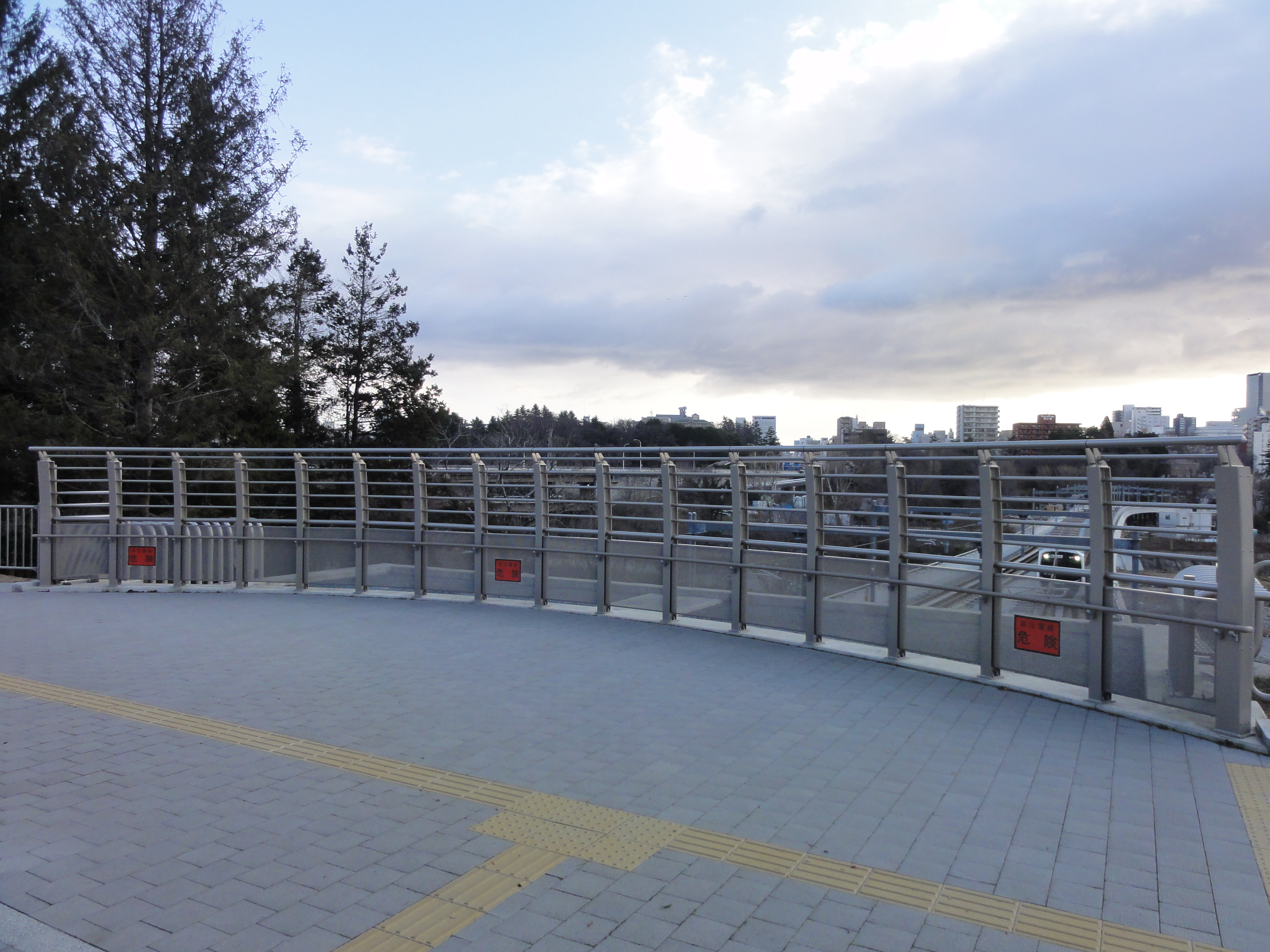
The train viewing area in January 2016

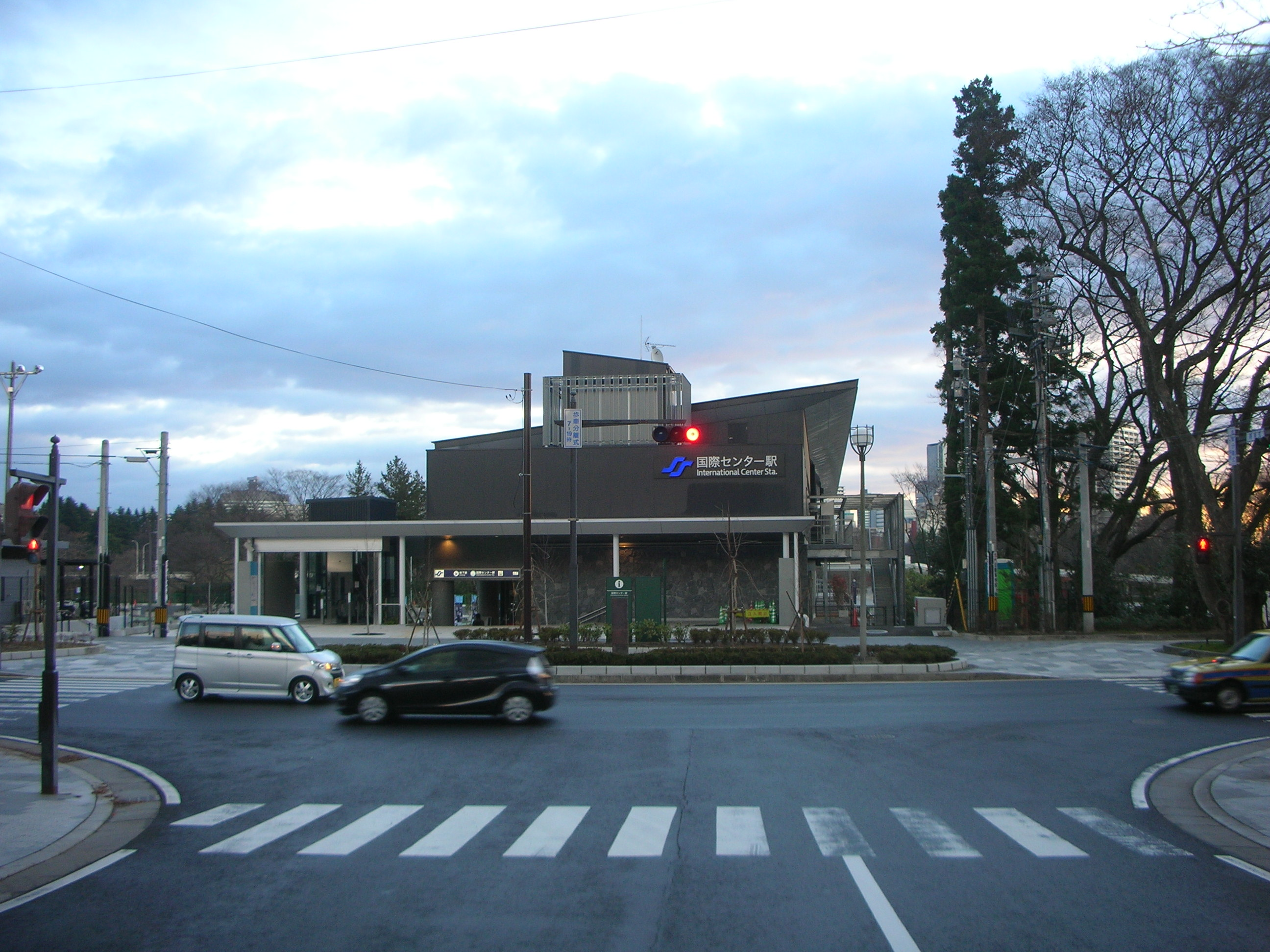
"West 1" entrance

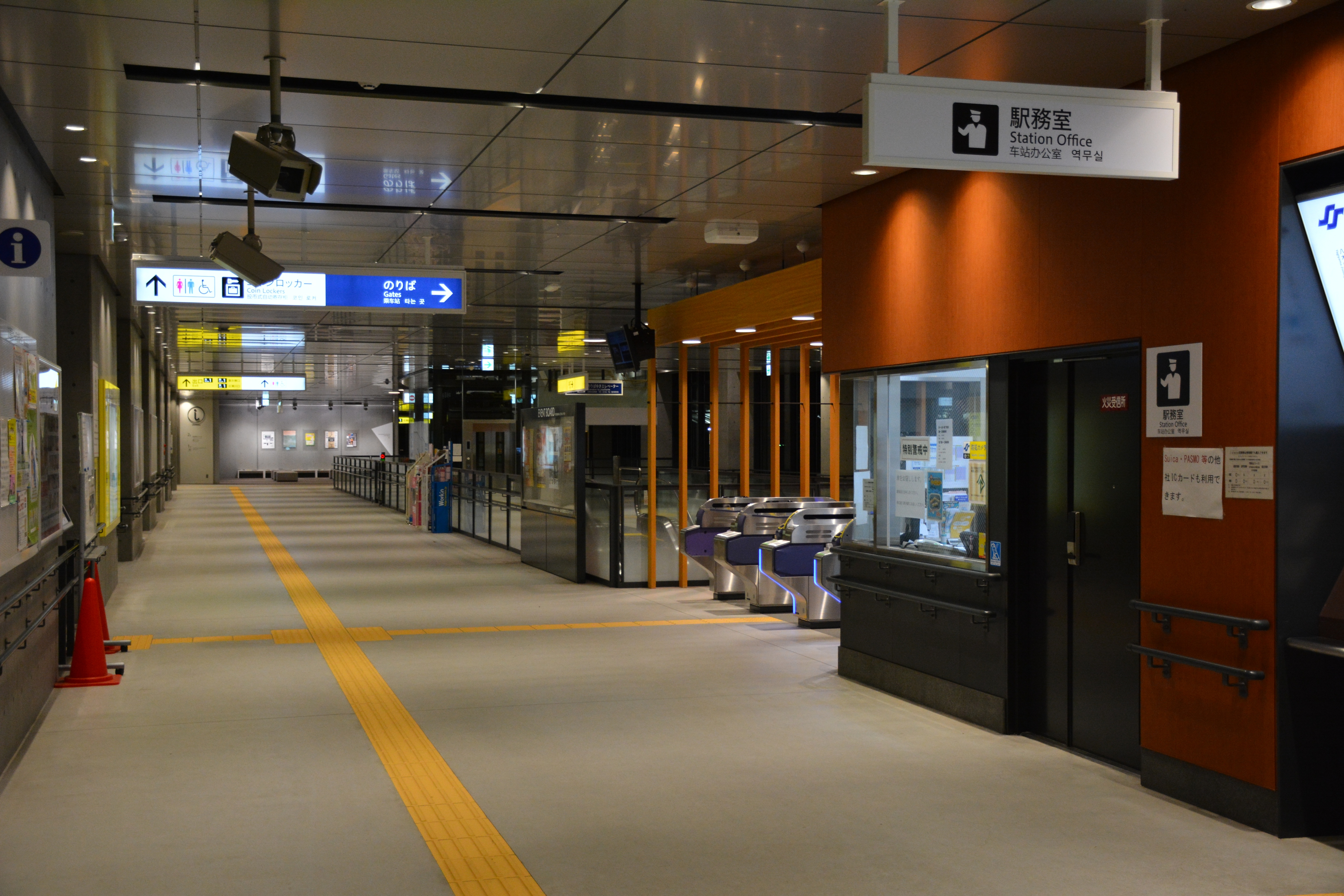
Ticket hall

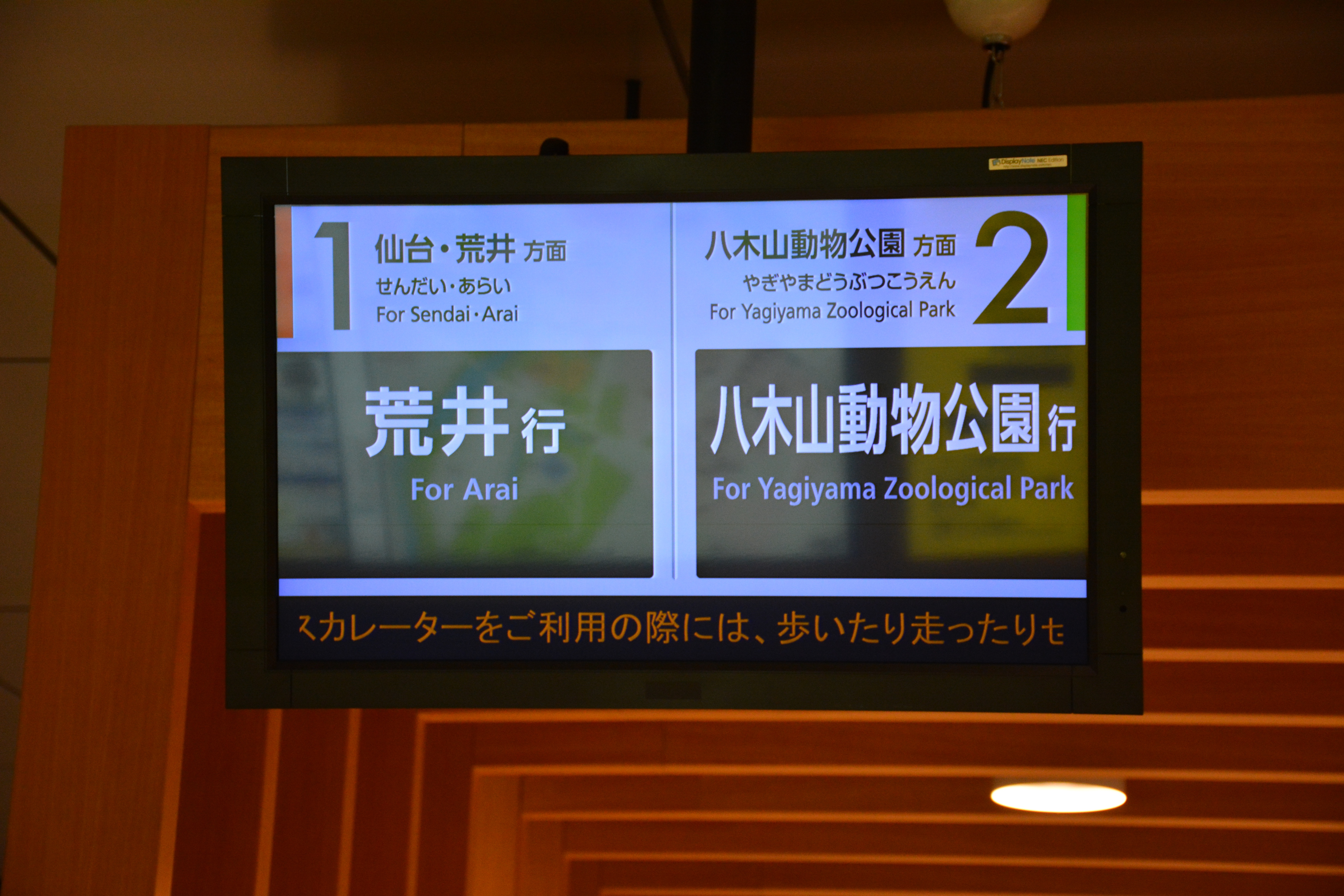
Ticket hall information display

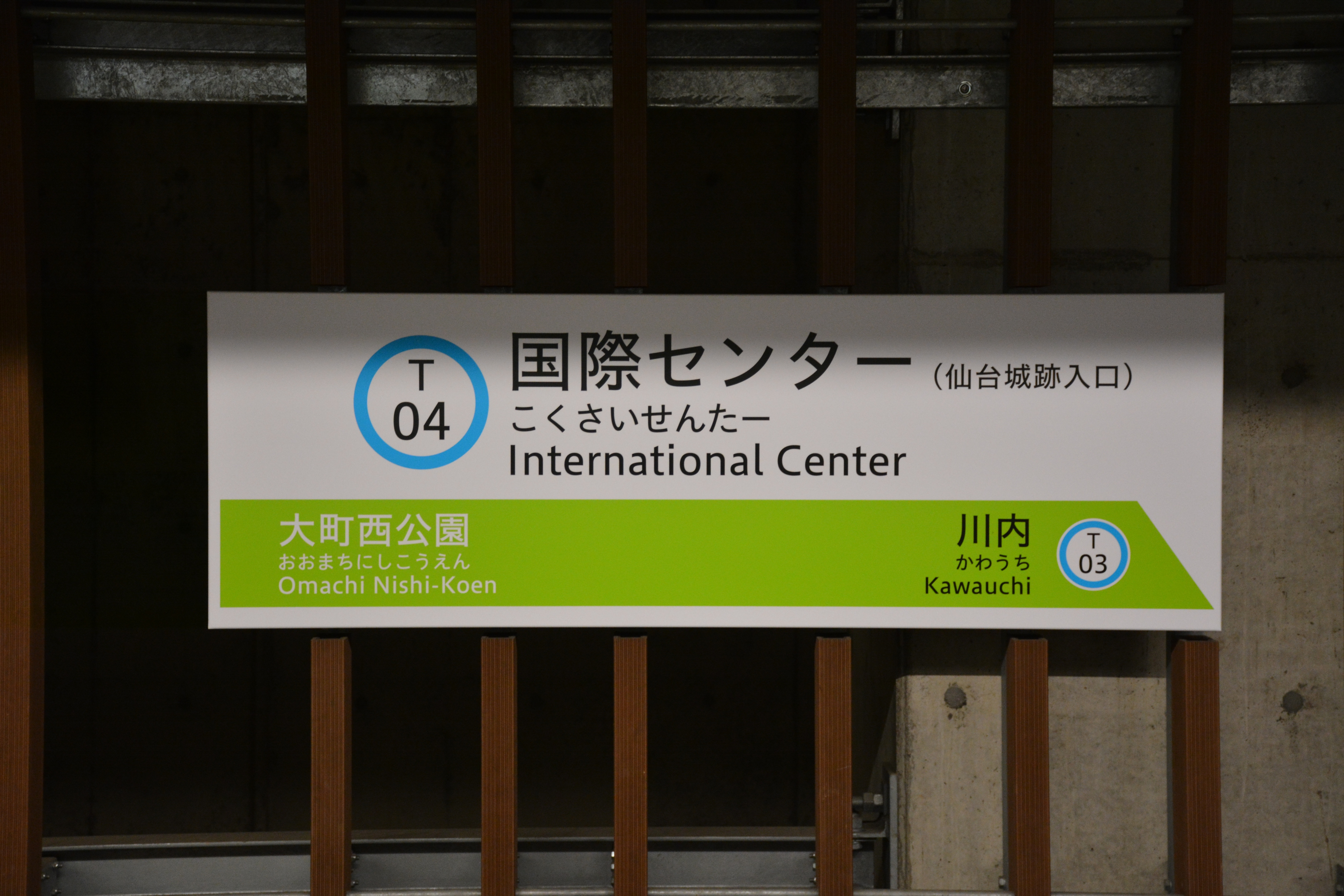
Platform sign

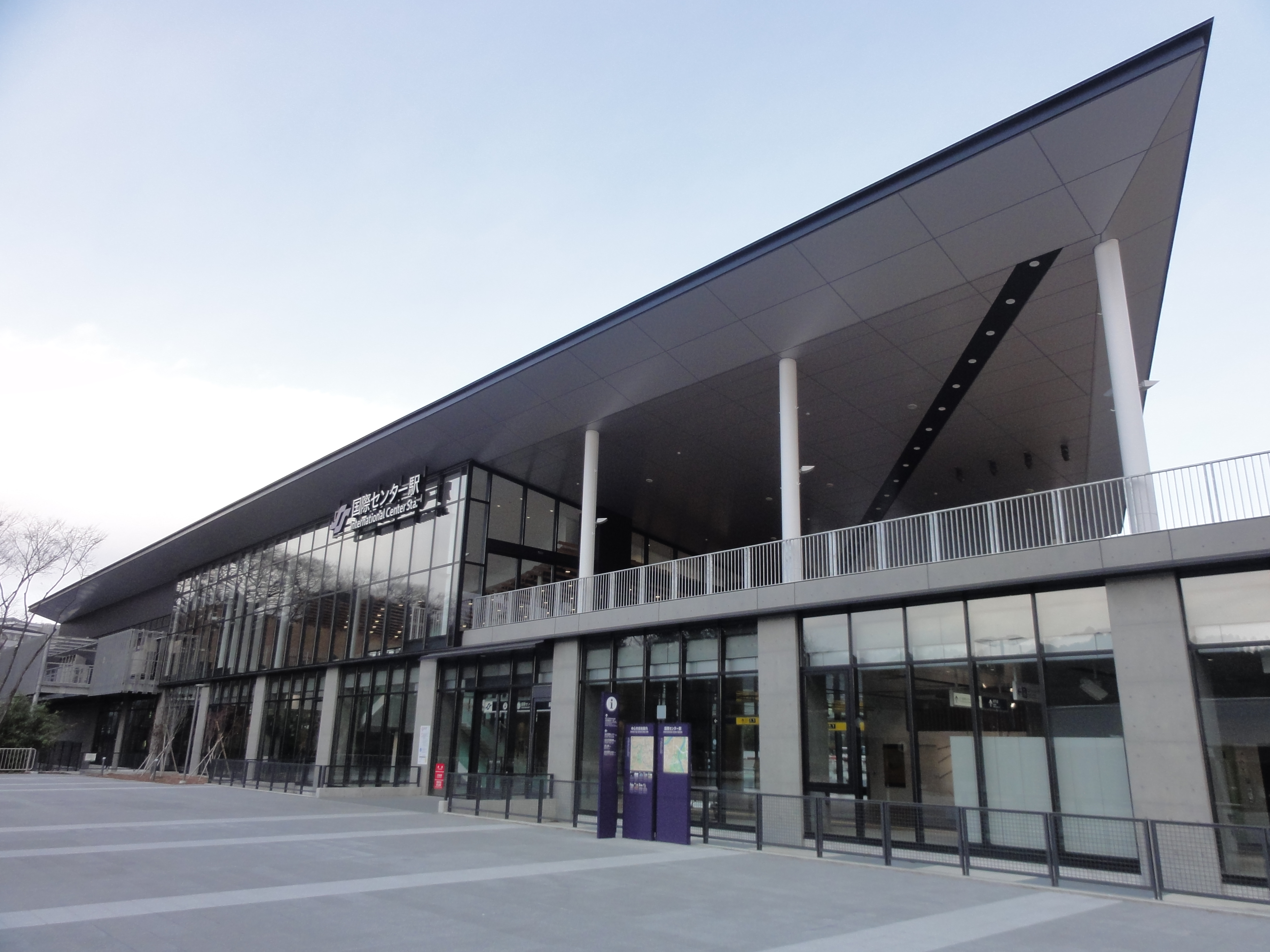
"South 1" exit

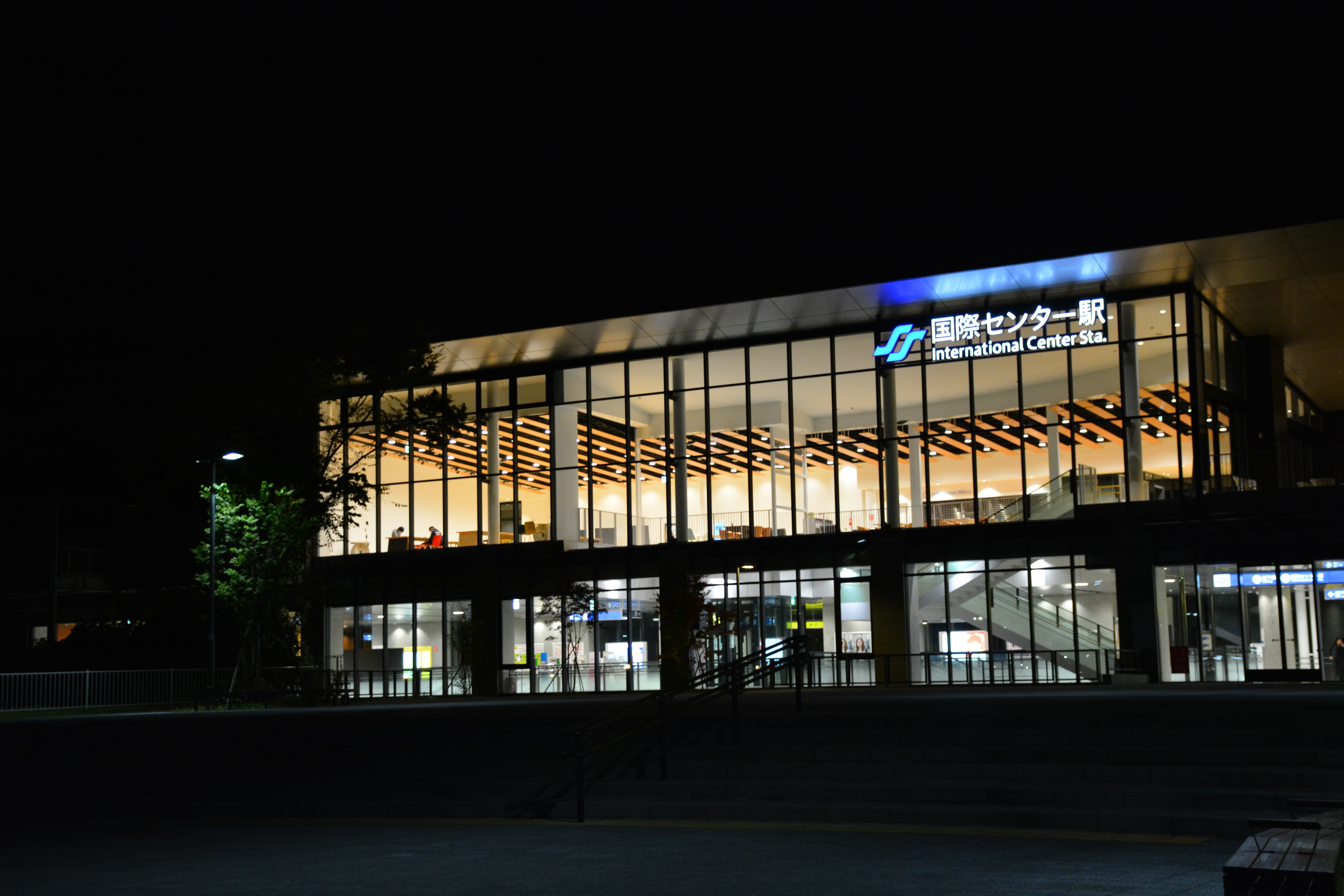
International Center Station in August 2016

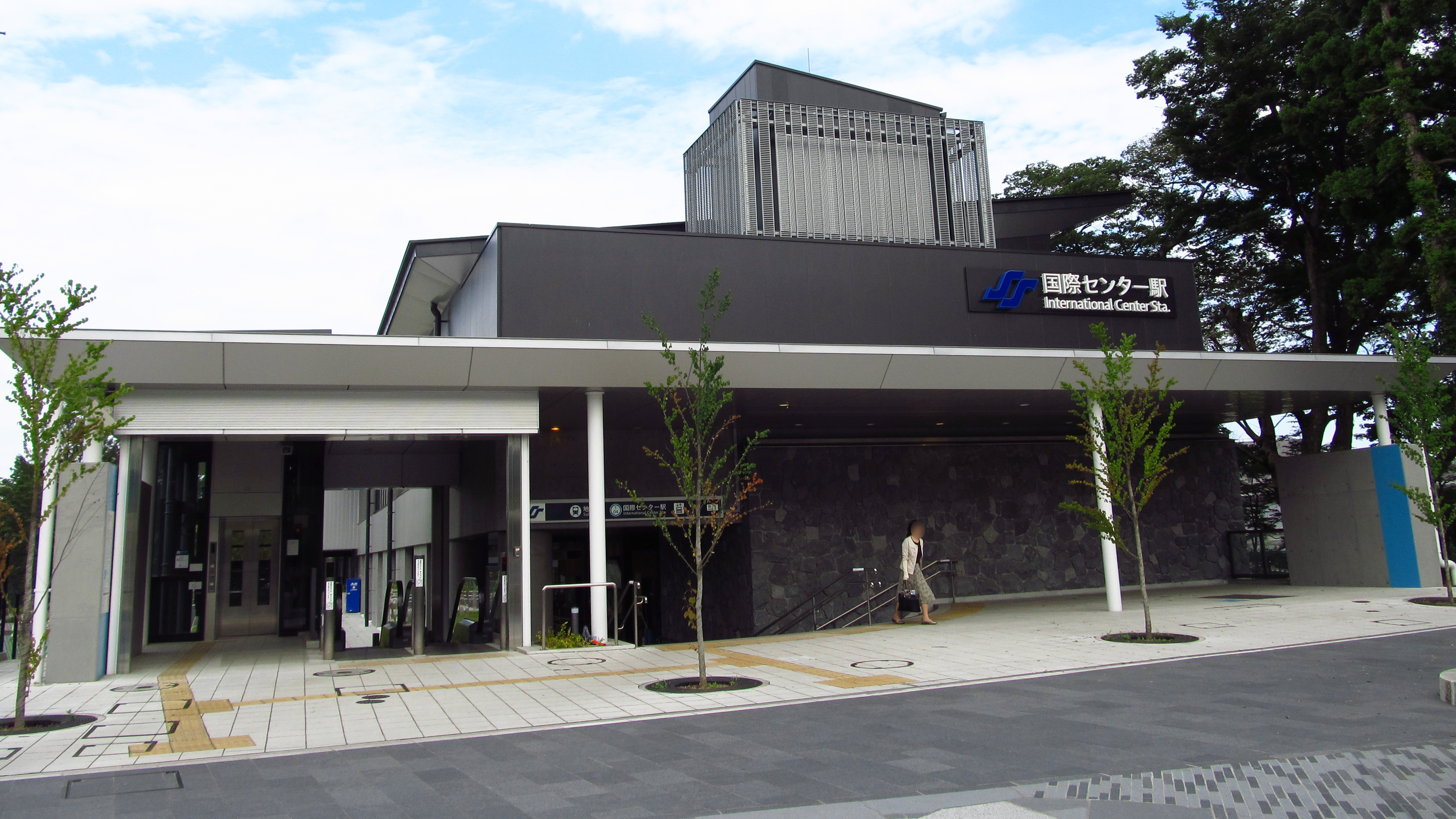
"West 1" entrance

== Staffing ==
The station is staffed and operated by sub-contracted employees from the security company Alsok.

== History ==
The station opened on 6 December 2015, coinciding with the opening of the Tōzai Line.

== Passenger statistics ==
In fiscal 2015, the station was used by an average of 2,533 passengers daily.

== Surrounding area ==
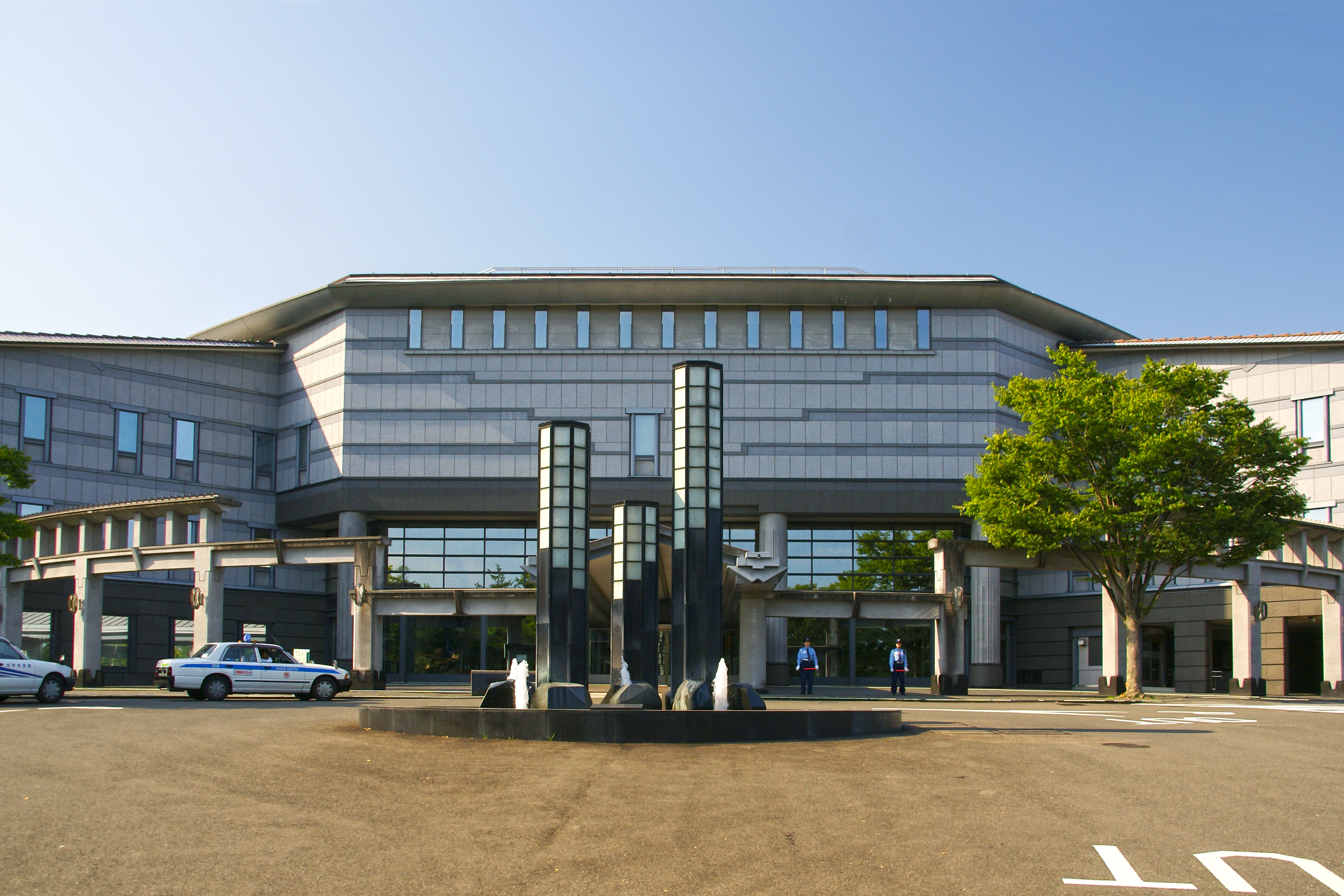
Sendai International Center

- Sendai International Center
- Aoba-yama Park
- Sendai City Museum
- Aoba Castle
- The Miyagi Museum of Art
- Tohoku University Kawauchi Campus
- Sendai No. 2 High School

== See also ==
- List of railway stations in Japan
