= Omachi Nishi-koen Station =

Metro station in Sendai, Japan

T05 Omachi Nishi-koen Station 大町西公園駅
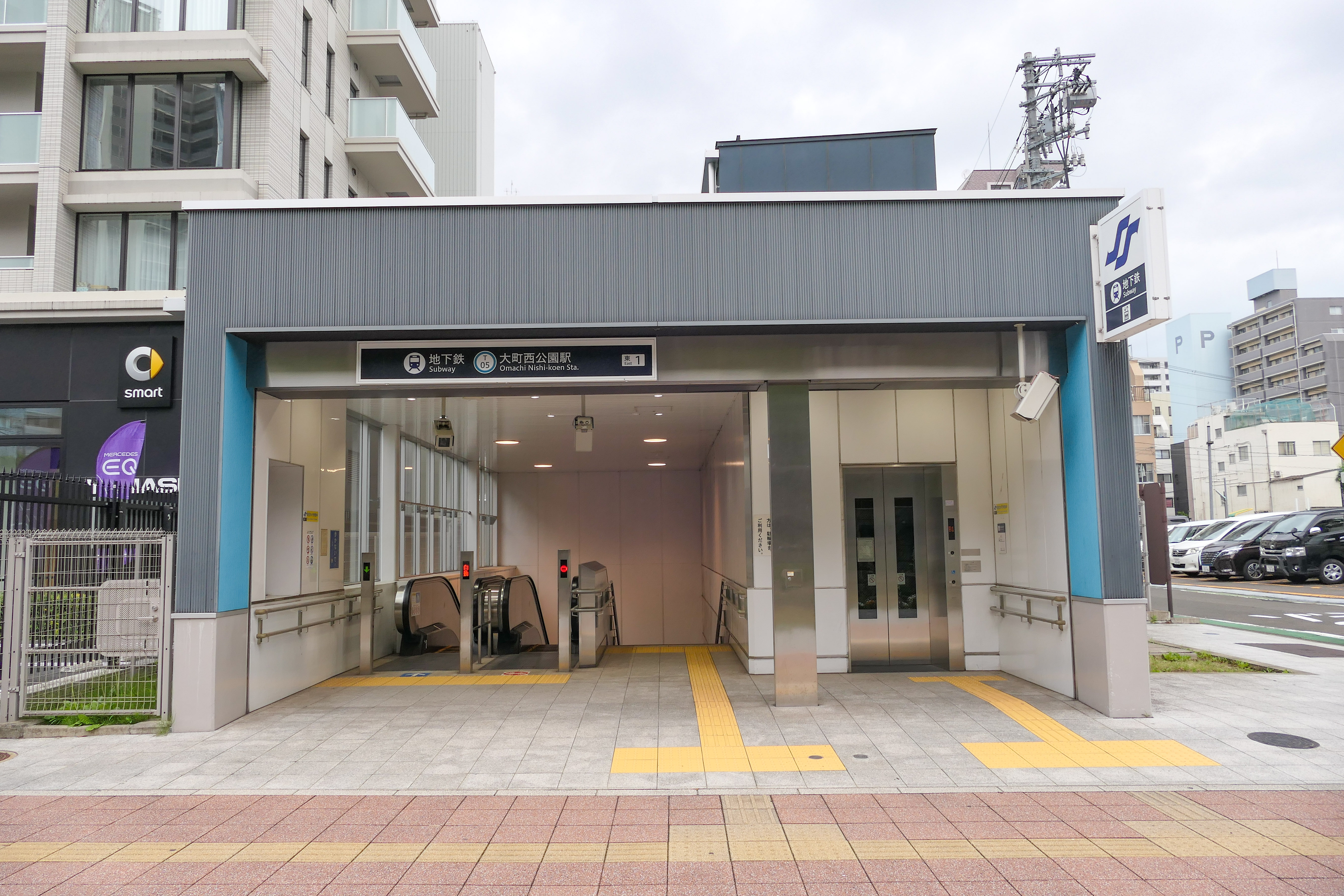
- The "East 1" entrance in June 2024

General information
- Location: 2-3-14 Ōmachi, Aoba-ku, Sendai-shi, Miyagi-ken 980-0804; Japan
- Coordinates: 38°15′32″N 140°51′53″E
- System: Sendai Subway station
- Operator: Sendai City Transportation Bureau
- Line: Tōzai Line
- Distance: 5 km (3.1 mi) from Yagiyama Zoological Park
- Platforms: 1 island platform
- Tracks: 2

Construction
- Structure type: Underground
- Accessible: Yes

Other information
- Status: Staffed
- Station code: T05
- Website: Official website

History
- Opened: 6 December 2015; 10 years ago

Passengers
- FY2015: 1,608 daily

Services
Preceding station	Sendai Subway	Following station
International Center T04 towards Yagiyama Zoological Park	Tōzai Line	Aoba-dori Ichibancho T06 towards Arai
Location
- Location within Miyagi Prefecture

Omachi Nishi-koen Station (大町西公園駅, Ōmachi Nishi-kōen-eki) is a subway station on the Sendai Subway Tōzai Line in Aoba-ku, Sendai, Japan, operated by the municipal subway operator Sendai City Transportation Bureau.

== Lines ==
Omachi Nishi-koen Station is served by the 13.9 km (8.6 mi) Sendai Subway Tōzai Line between Yagiyama Zoological Park and Arai, and is located 5.0 km (3.1 mi) from the western terminus of the line at Yagiyama Zoological Park Station. The station is numbered "T05".

== Station layout ==
The station has one island platform serving two tracks on the second basement ("B2F") level. The ticket barriers are located on the first basement ("B1F") level.

=== Platforms ===
1	■ Tōzai Line	■ for Sendai and Arai
2	■ Tōzai Line	■ for Yagiyama Zoological Park

== Gallery ==
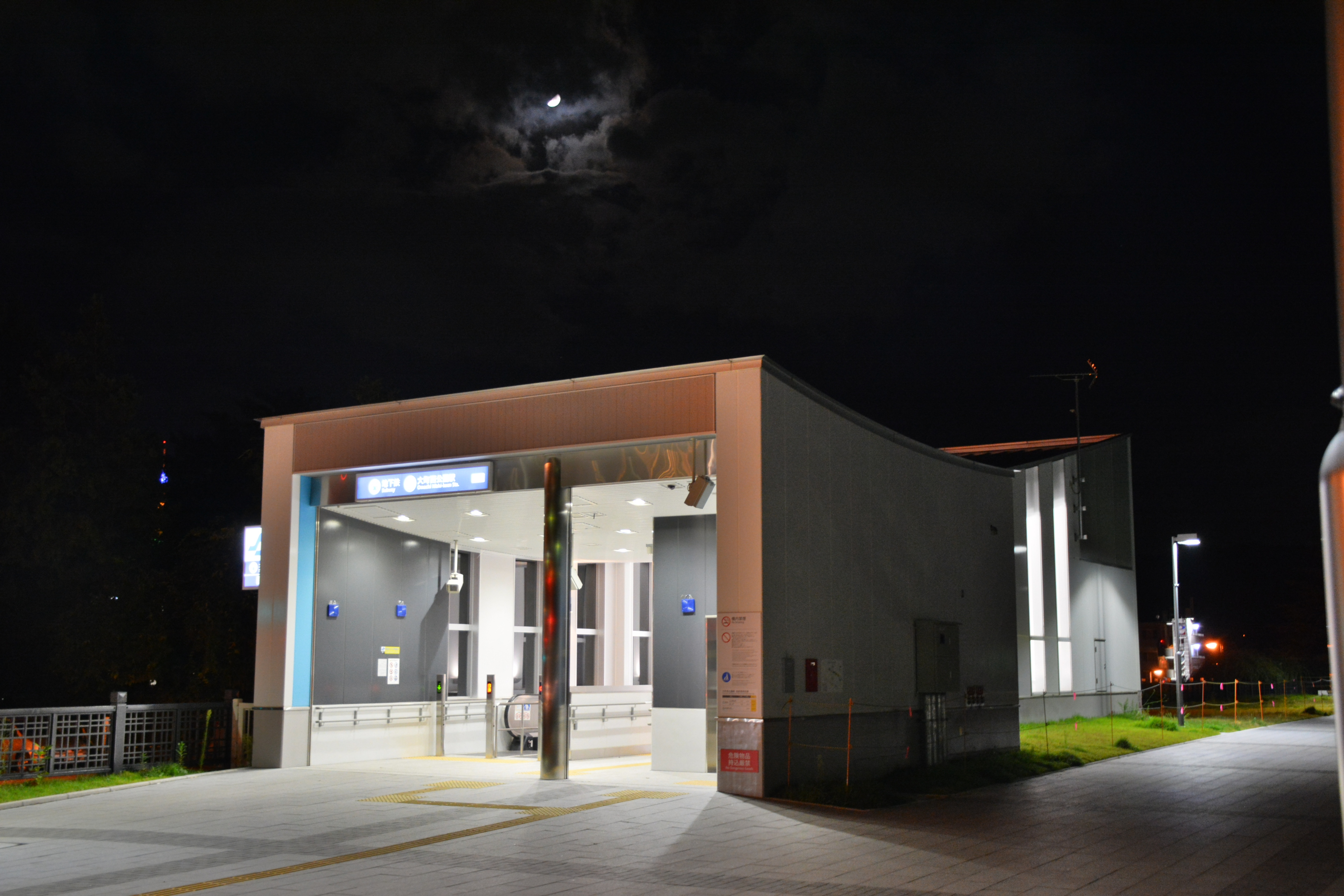
"West 1" entrance at night

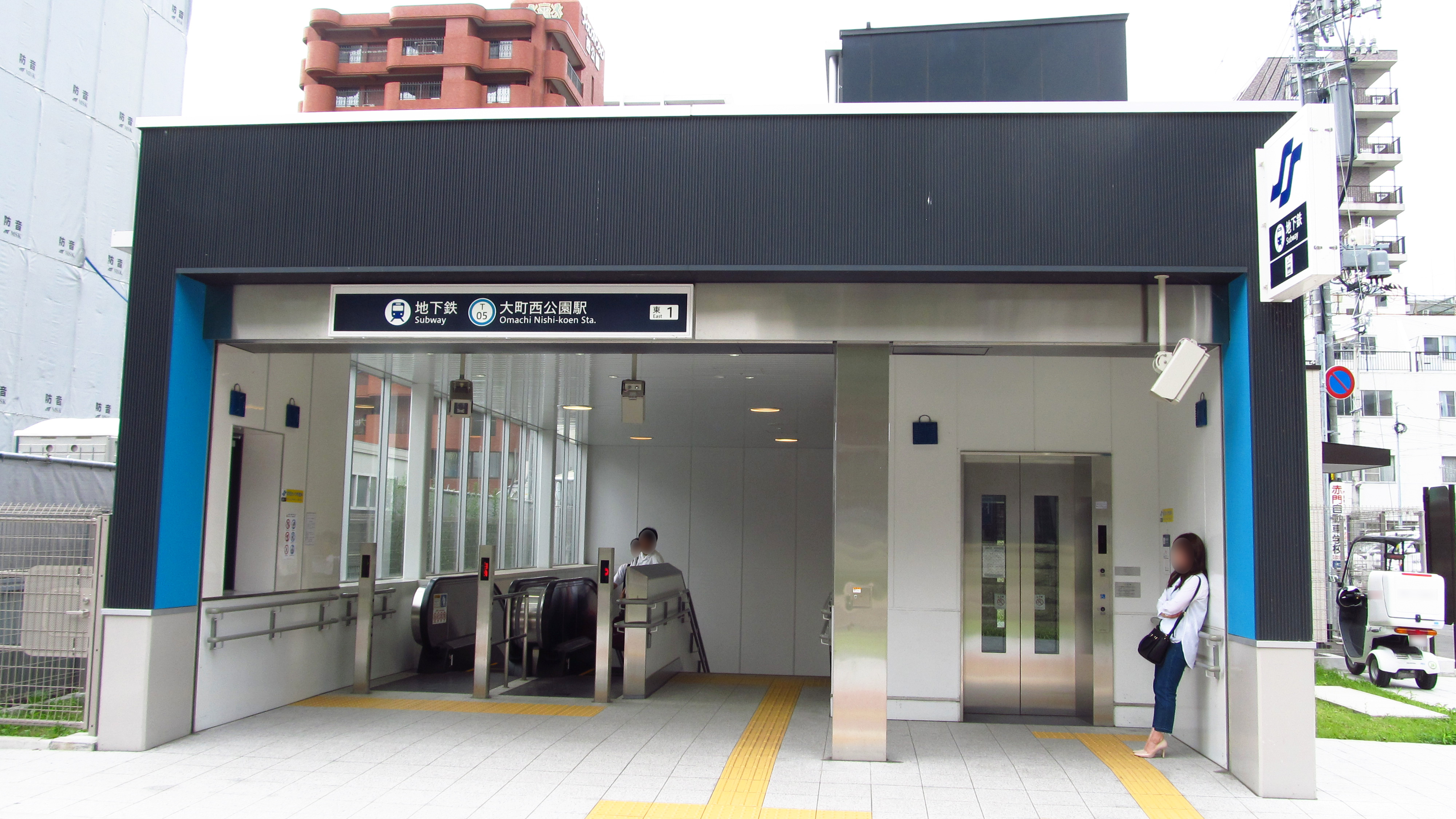
"East 1" entrance

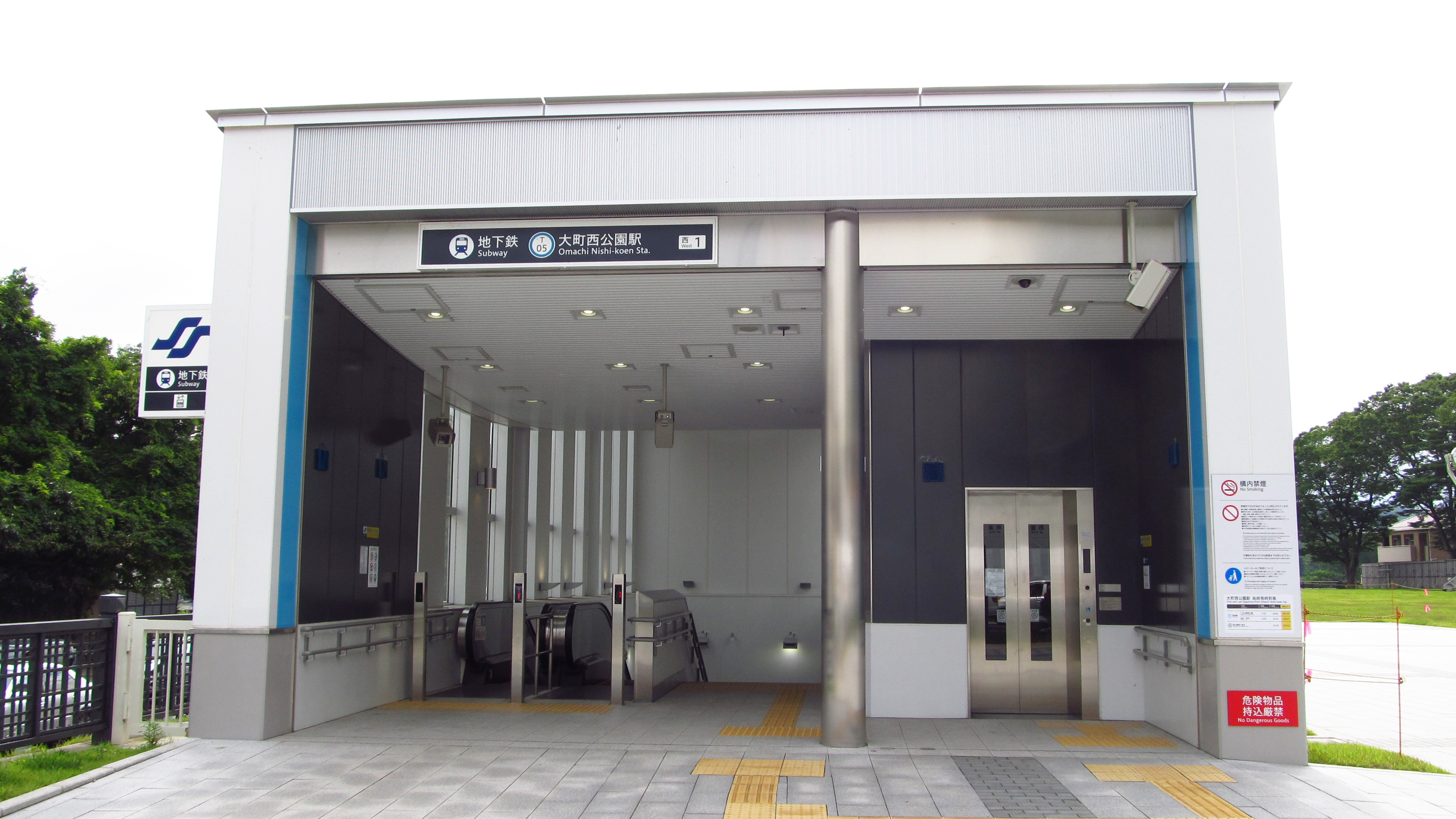
"West 1" entrance

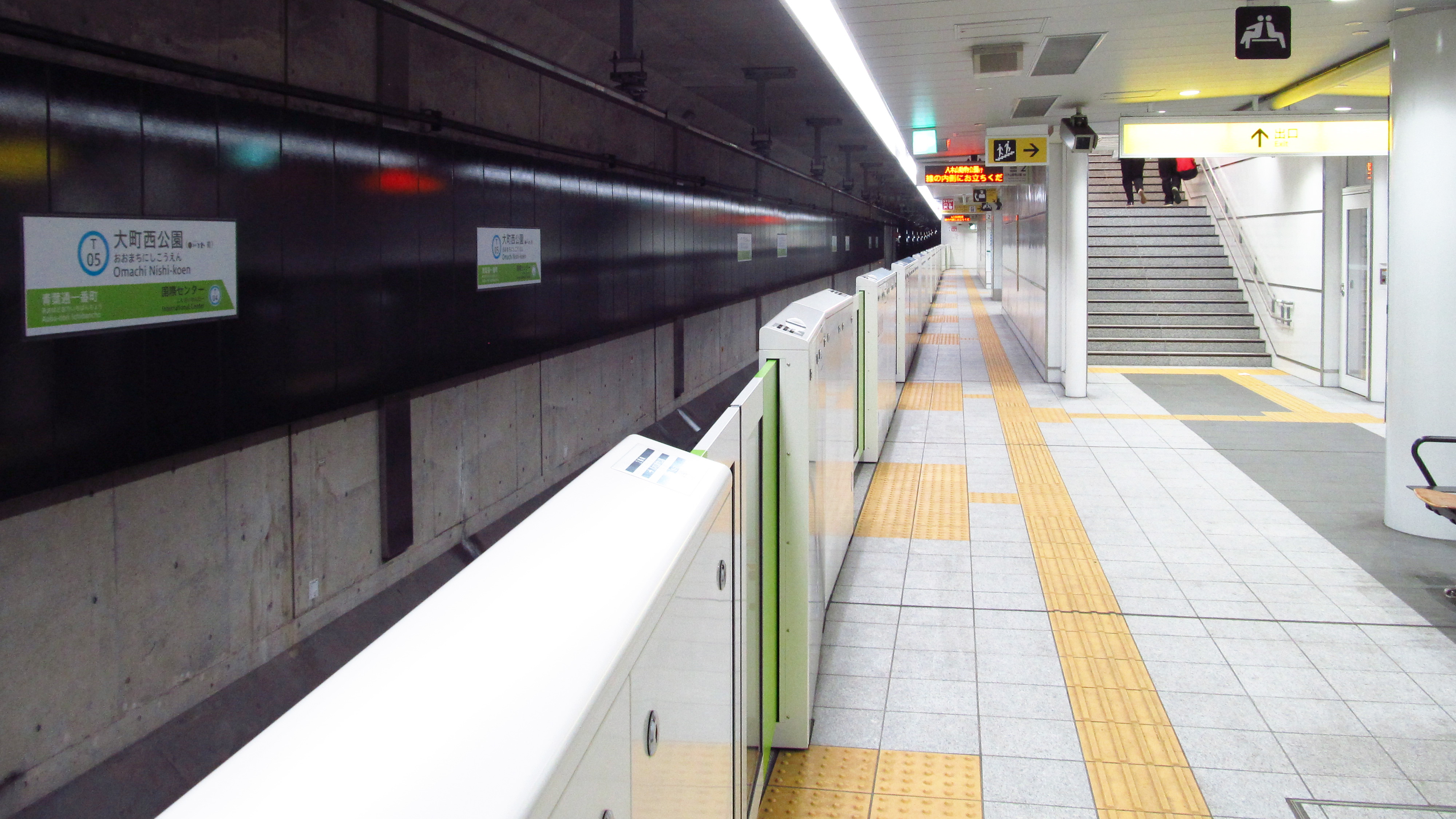
The platform

== Staffing ==
From fiscal 2018, this station will be staffed and operated by sub-contracted employees from the security company Alsok.

== History ==
The station opened on 6 December 2015, coinciding with the opening of the Tōzai Line.

== Passenger statistics ==
In fiscal 2015, the station was used by an average of 1,608 passengers daily.

== Surrounding area ==
- Nishi Park

== See also ==
- List of railway stations in Japan
