= Aobayama Station =

Metro station in Sendai, Japan

T02 Aobayama Station 青葉山駅
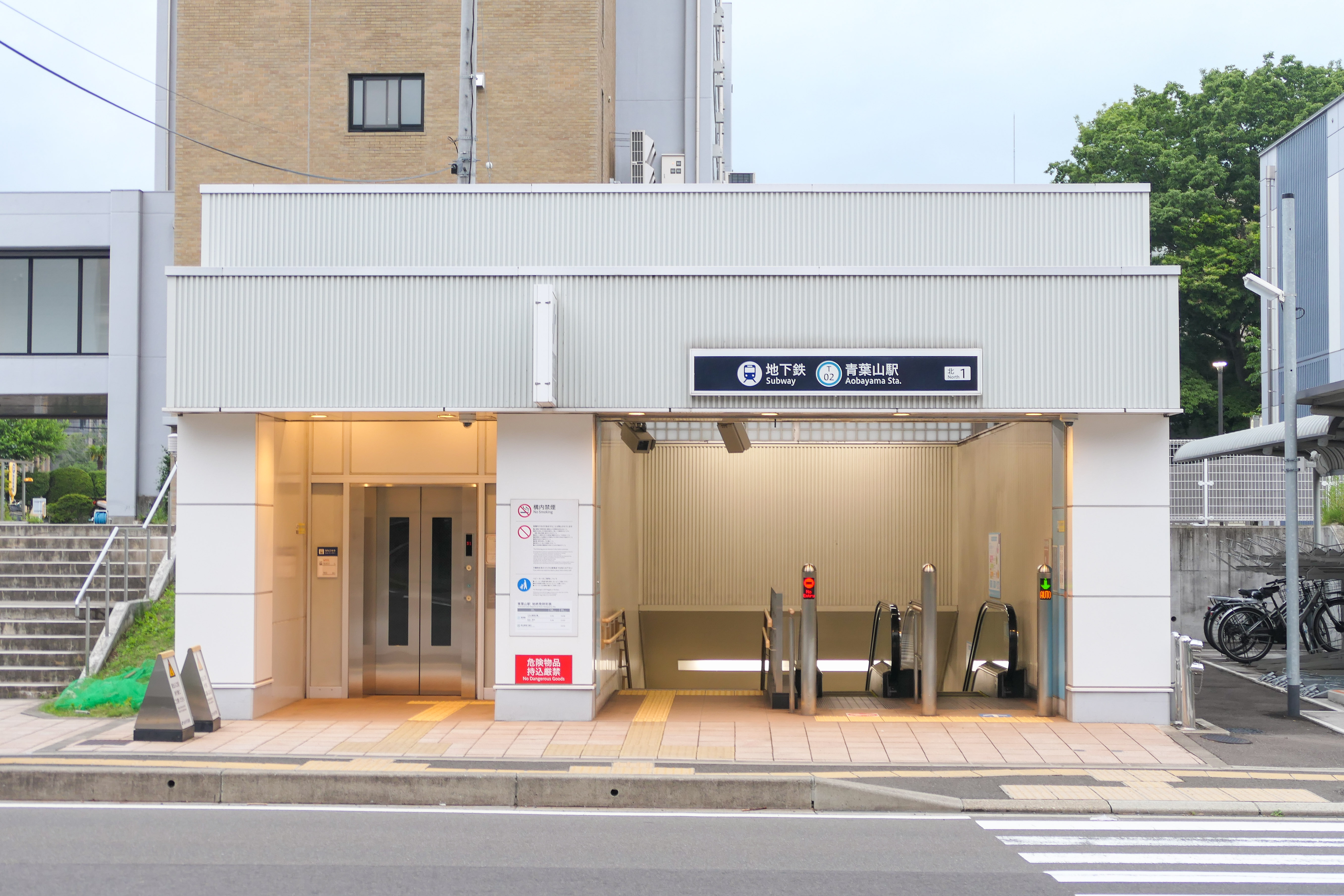
- The "North 1" entrance in June 2024

General information
- Location: 468-1 Aoba-Aramaki, Aoba-ku, Sendai-shi, Miyagi-ken 980-0845; Japan
- Coordinates: 38.2550°N 140.8352°E
- System: Sendai Subway station
- Operator: Sendai City Transportation Bureau
- Line: Tōzai Line
- Distance: 2.1 km (1.3 mi) from Yagiyama Zoological Park
- Platforms: 1 island platform
- Tracks: 2

Construction
- Structure type: Underground
- Accessible: Yes

Other information
- Status: Staffed
- Station code: T02
- Website: Official website

History
- Opened: 6 December 2015

Passengers
- FY2015: 2,791 daily

Services
Preceding station	Sendai Subway	Following station
Yagiyama Zoological Park T01 Terminus	Tōzai Line	Kawauchi T03 towards Arai
Location
- Location within Miyagi Prefecture

Aobayama Station (青葉山駅, Aobayama-eki) is a subway station on the Sendai Subway Tōzai Line in Aoba-ku, Sendai, Japan, operated by the municipal subway operator Sendai City Transportation Bureau.

== Lines ==
Aobayama Station is served by the 13.9 km (8.6 mi) Sendai Subway Tōzai Line between Yagiyama Zoological Park and Arai, and is located 2.1 km (1.3 mi) from the western terminus of the line at Yagiyama Zoological Park Station. The station is numbered "T02".

== Station layout ==
The station has one island platform serving two tracks on the sixth basement ("B6F") level. The ticket barriers are located on the first basement ("B1F") level.

=== Platforms ===
1	■ Tōzai Line	■ for Sendai and Arai
2	■ Tōzai Line	■ for Yagiyama Zoological Park

== Gallery ==
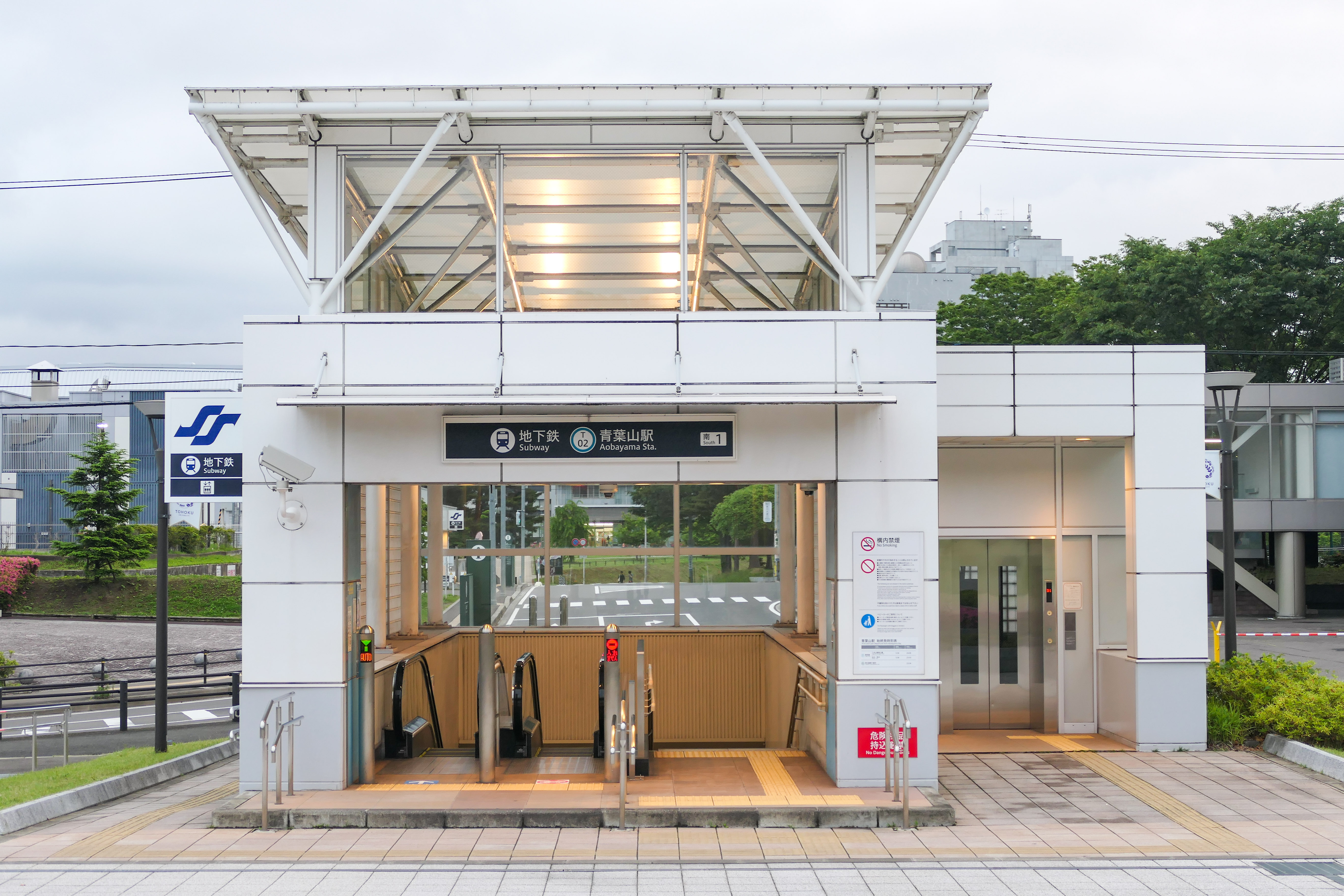
"South 1" entrance

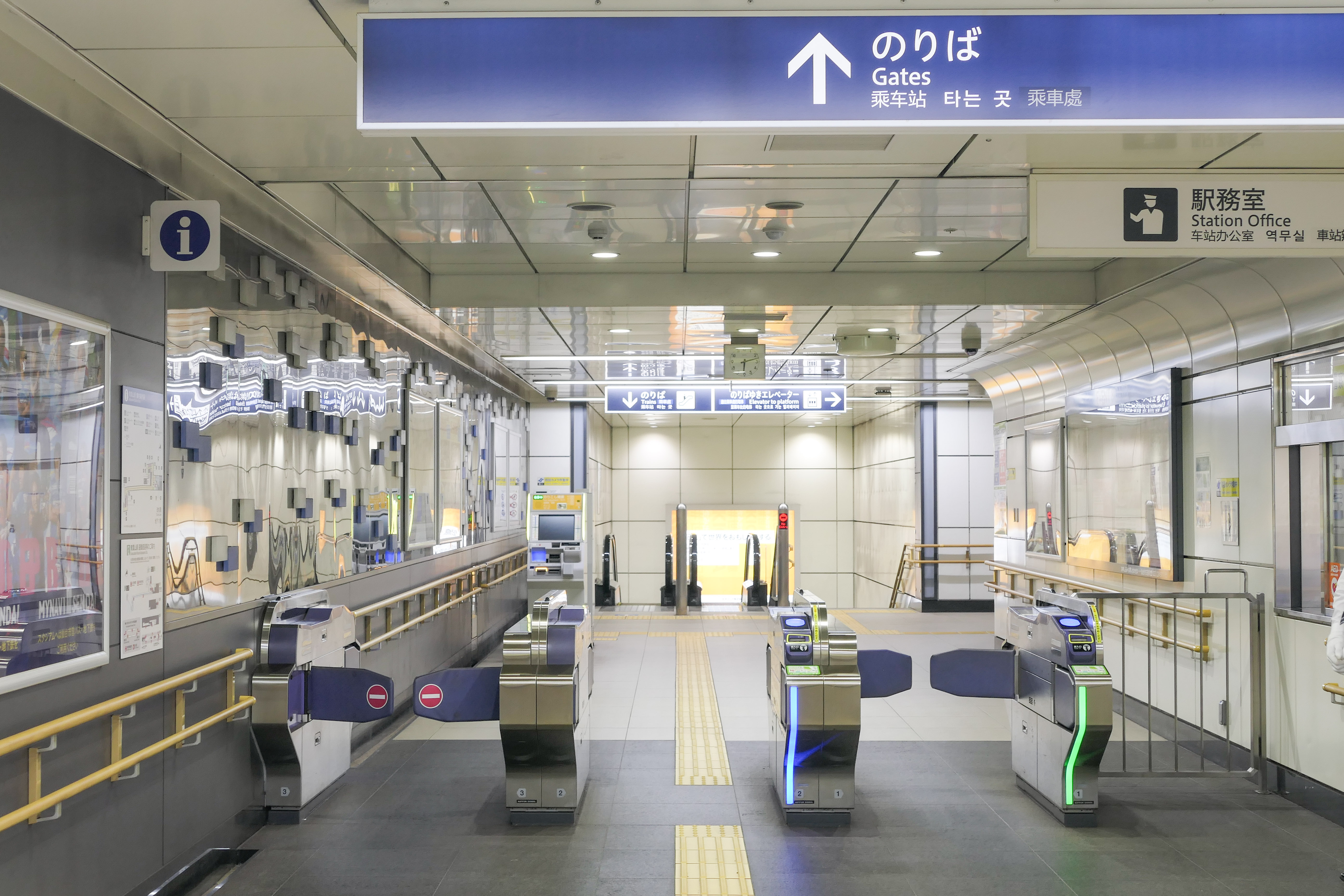
Gate

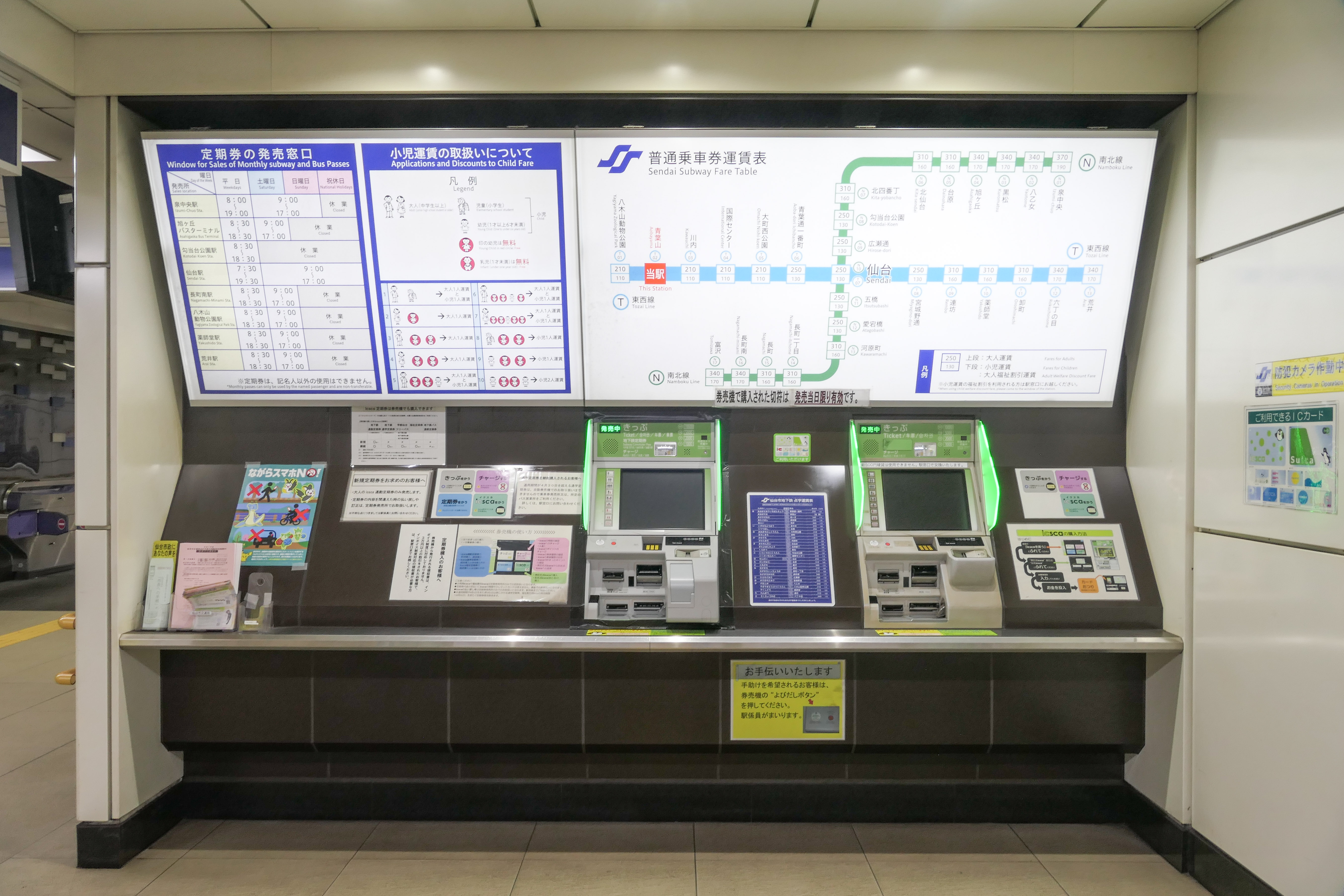
Ticket machines

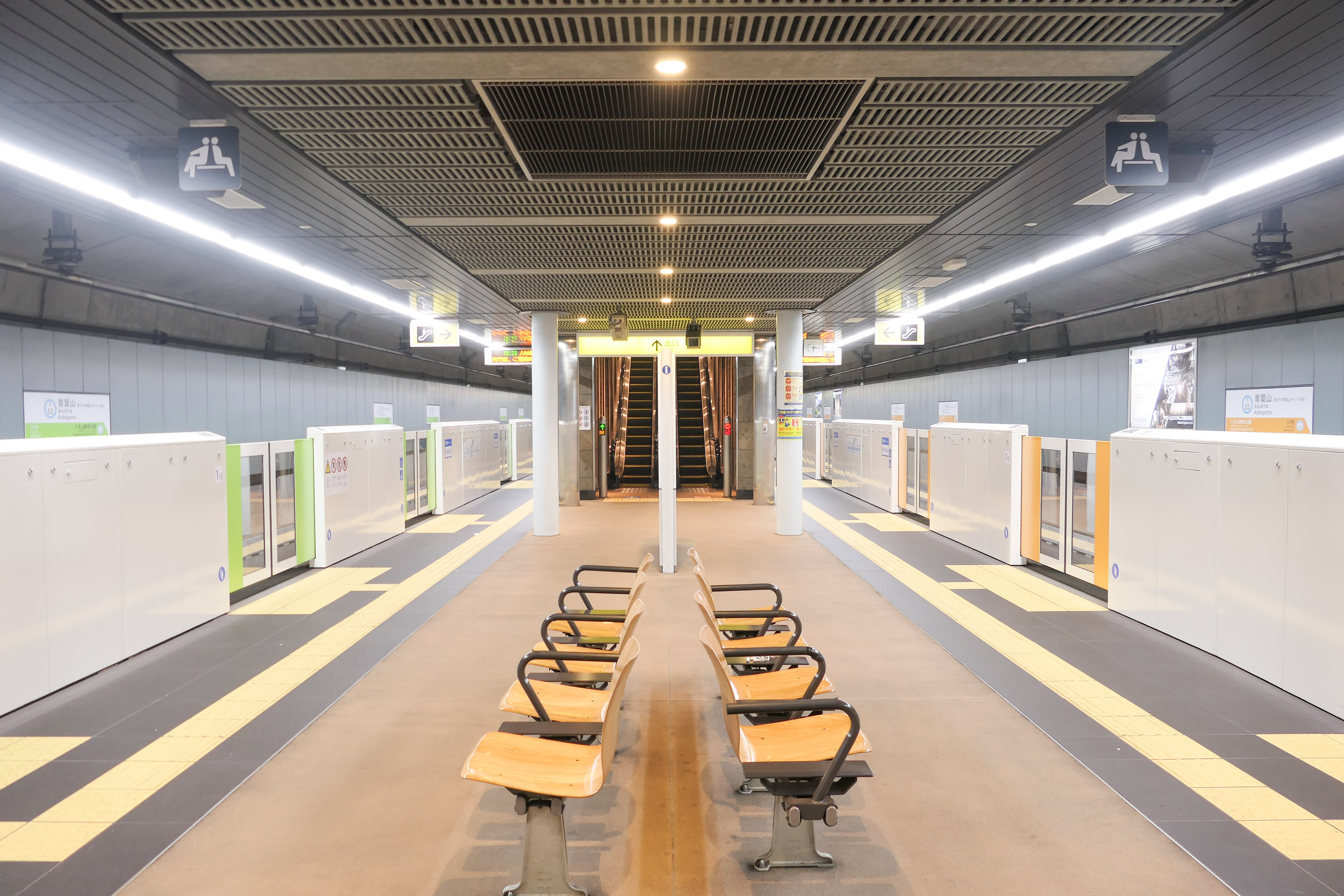
Platforms

== Staffing ==
The station is staffed and operated by sub-contracted employees from the security company Alsok.

== History ==
The station opened on 6 December 2015, coinciding with the opening of the Tōzai Line.

== Passenger statistics ==
In the fiscal year 2015, the station was used by an average of 2,791 passengers daily.

== Surrounding area ==
- Tohoku University Aobayama Campus
- Miyagi University of Education Aobayama Campus

== See also ==
- List of railway stations in Japan
