= Rokuchonome Station =

Metro station in Sendai, Japan

T12 Rokuchonome Station 六丁の目駅
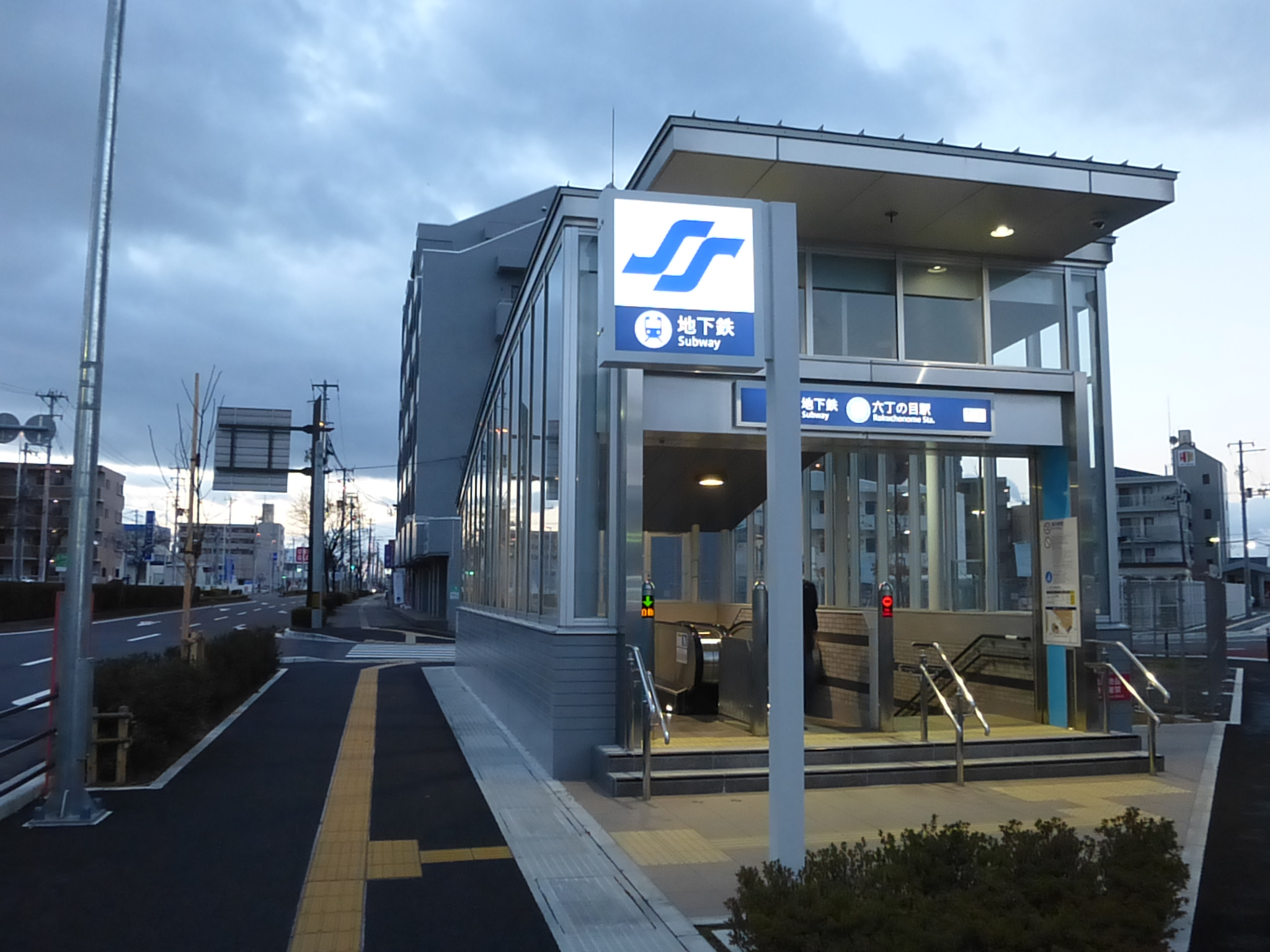
- The "South 1" entrance in December 2015

General information
- Location: Wakabayashi-ku, Sendai-shi, Miyagi-ken 984-0012; Japan
- Coordinates: 38.2510°N 140.9356°E
- System: Sendai Subway station
- Operator: Sendai City Transportation Bureau
- Line: Tōzai Line
- Distance: 12.3 km (7.6 mi) from Yagiyama Zoological Park
- Platforms: 1 island platform
- Tracks: 2

Construction
- Structure type: Underground
- Accessible: Yes

Other information
- Status: Staffed
- Station code: T12
- Website: Official website

History
- Opened: 6 December 2015; 10 years ago

Passengers
- FY2015 (Daily): 2,087

Services
Preceding station	Sendai Subway	Following station
Oroshimachi T11 towards Yagiyama Zoological Park	Tōzai Line	Arai T13 Terminus
Location
- Location within Miyagi Prefecture

Rokuchonome Station (六丁の目駅, Rokuchōnome-eki) is a subway station on the Sendai Subway Tōzai Line in Wakabayashi-ku, Sendai, Japan, operated by the municipal subway operator Sendai City Transportation Bureau.

== Lines ==
Rokuchonome Station is served by the 13.9 km (8.6 mi) Sendai Subway Tōzai Line between Yagiyama Zoological Park and Arai, and is located 12.3 km (7.6 mi) from the western terminus of the line at Yagiyama Zoological Park Station. The station is numbered "T12".

== Station layout ==
The station has one island platform serving two tracks on the third basement ("B3F") level. The ticket barriers are located on the first basement ("B1F") level.

=== Platforms ===
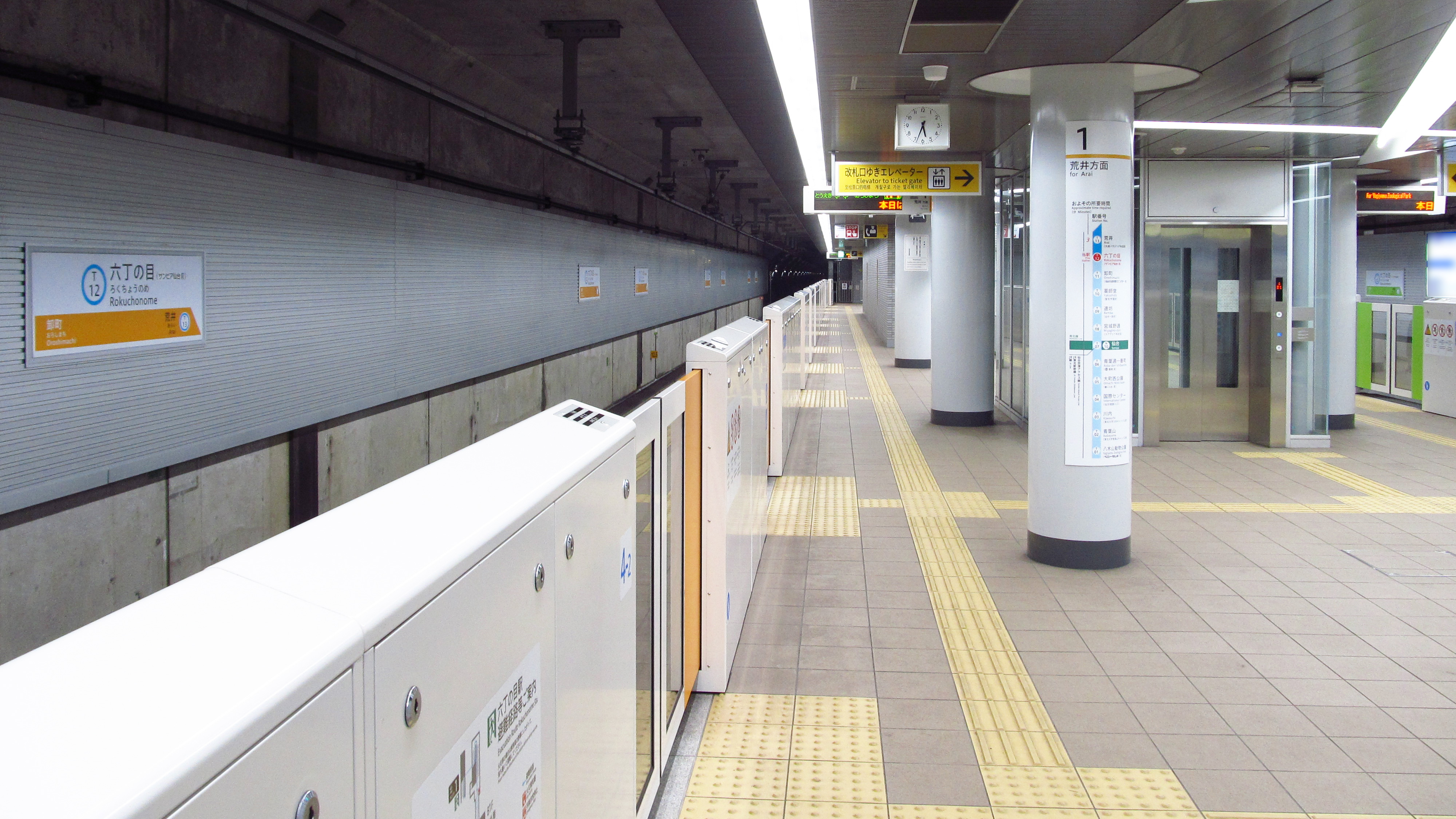
station platform

1	■ Tōzai Line	■ for Arai
2	■ Tōzai Line	■ for Sendai and Yagiyama Zoological Park

== Staffing ==
The station is staffed and operated by sub-contracted employees from the security company Alsok.

== History ==
The station opened on 6 December 2015, coinciding with the opening of the Tozai Line.

== Passenger statistics ==
In fiscal 2015, the station was used by an average of 2,087 passengers daily.

== Surrounding area ==
- Sendai Kabanomachi Junior High School

== See also ==
- List of railway stations in Japan
