= Oroshimachi Station (Miyagi) =

Metro station in Sendai, Japan

T11 Oroshimachi Station 卸町駅
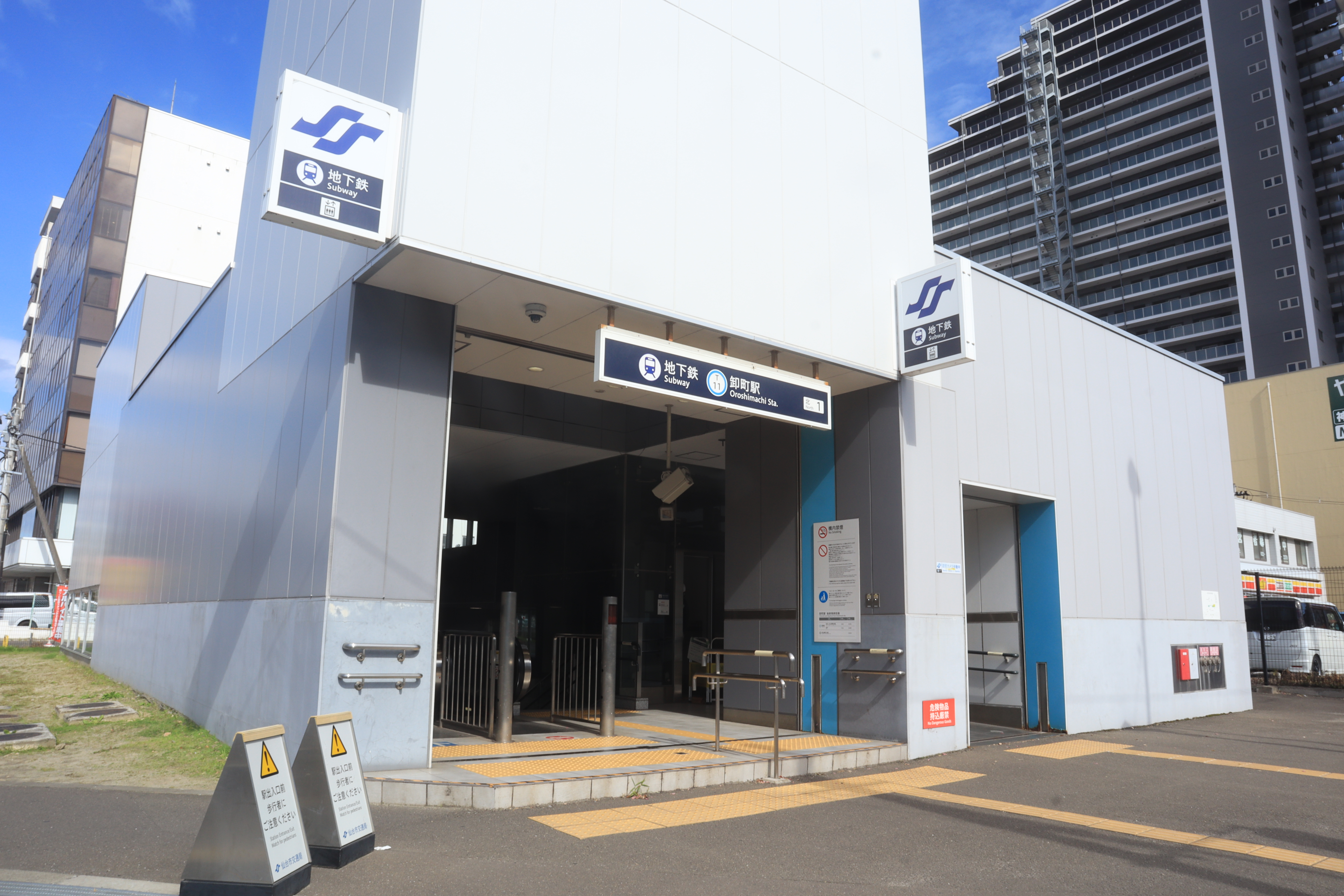
- The "North 1" entrance in October 2025

General information
- Location: Wakabayashi-ku, Sendai-shi, Miyagi-ken 984-0015; Japan
- Coordinates: 38.2515°N 140.9208°E
- System: Sendai Subway station
- Operator: Sendai City Transportation Bureau
- Line: Tōzai Line
- Distance: 11 km (6.8 mi) from Yagiyama Zoological Park
- Platforms: 1 island platform
- Tracks: 2

Construction
- Structure type: Underground
- Accessible: Yes

Other information
- Status: Staffed
- Station code: T11
- Website: Official website

History
- Opened: 6 December 2015; 10 years ago

Passengers
- FY2015 (Daily): 2,824

Services
Preceding station	Sendai Subway	Following station
Yakushido T10 towards Yagiyama Zoological Park	Tōzai Line	Rokuchonome T12 towards Arai
Location
- Location within Miyagi Prefecture

Oroshimachi Station (卸町駅, Oroshimachi-eki) is a subway station on the Sendai Subway Tōzai Line in Wakabayashi-ku, Sendai, Japan, operated by the municipal subway operator Sendai City Transportation Bureau.

== Lines ==
Oroshimachi Station is served by the 13.9 km (8.6 mi) Sendai Subway Tōzai Line between Yagiyama Zoological Park and Arai, and is located 11.0 km (6.8 mi) from the western terminus of the line at Yagiyama Zoological Park Station. The station is numbered "T11".

== Station layout ==
The station has one island platform serving two tracks on the second basement ("B2F") level. The ticket barriers are located on the first basement ("B1F") level.

=== Platforms ===
1	■ Tōzai Line	■ for Arai
2	■ Tōzai Line	■ for Sendai and Yagiyama Zoological Park

== Gallery ==
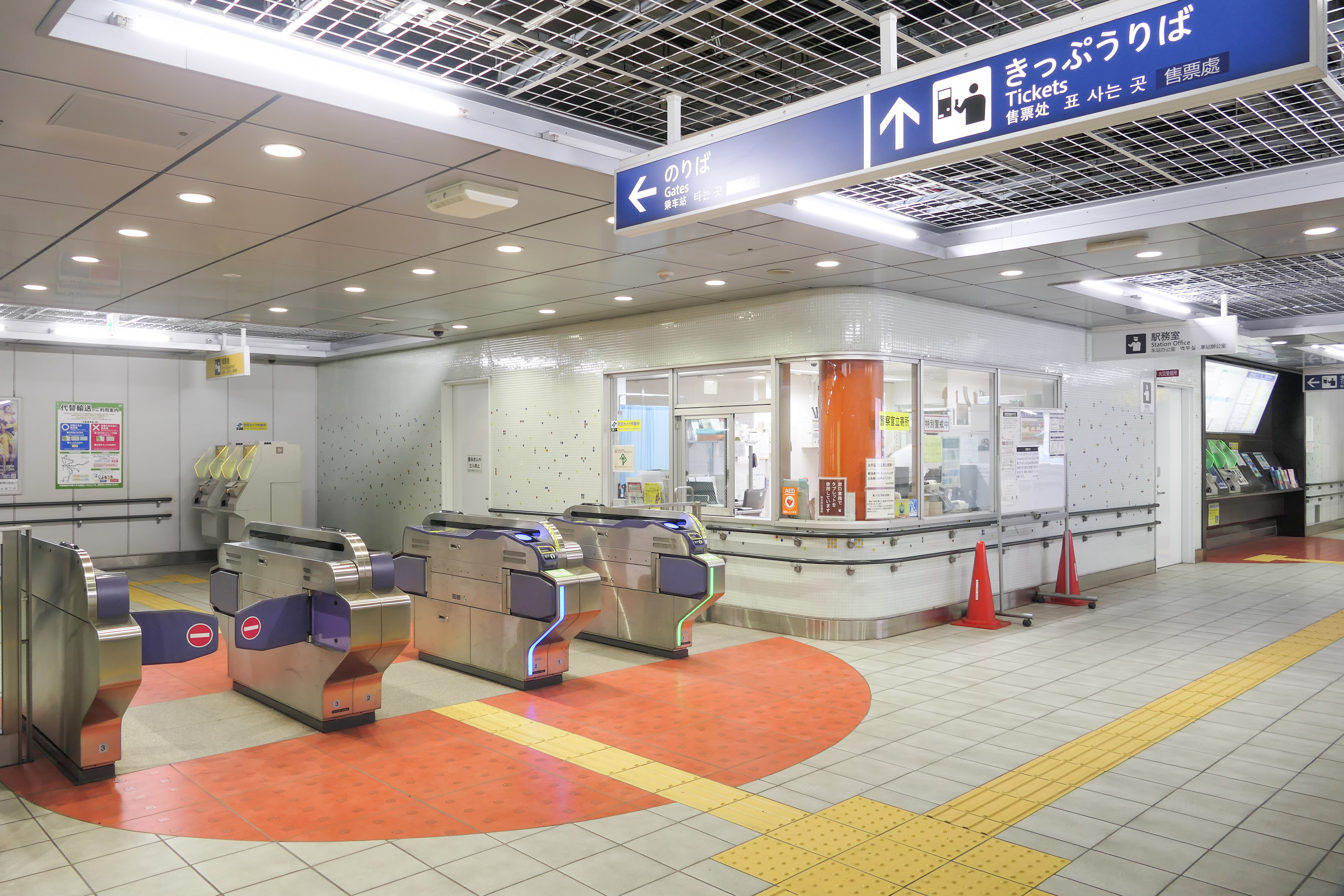
ticket gate

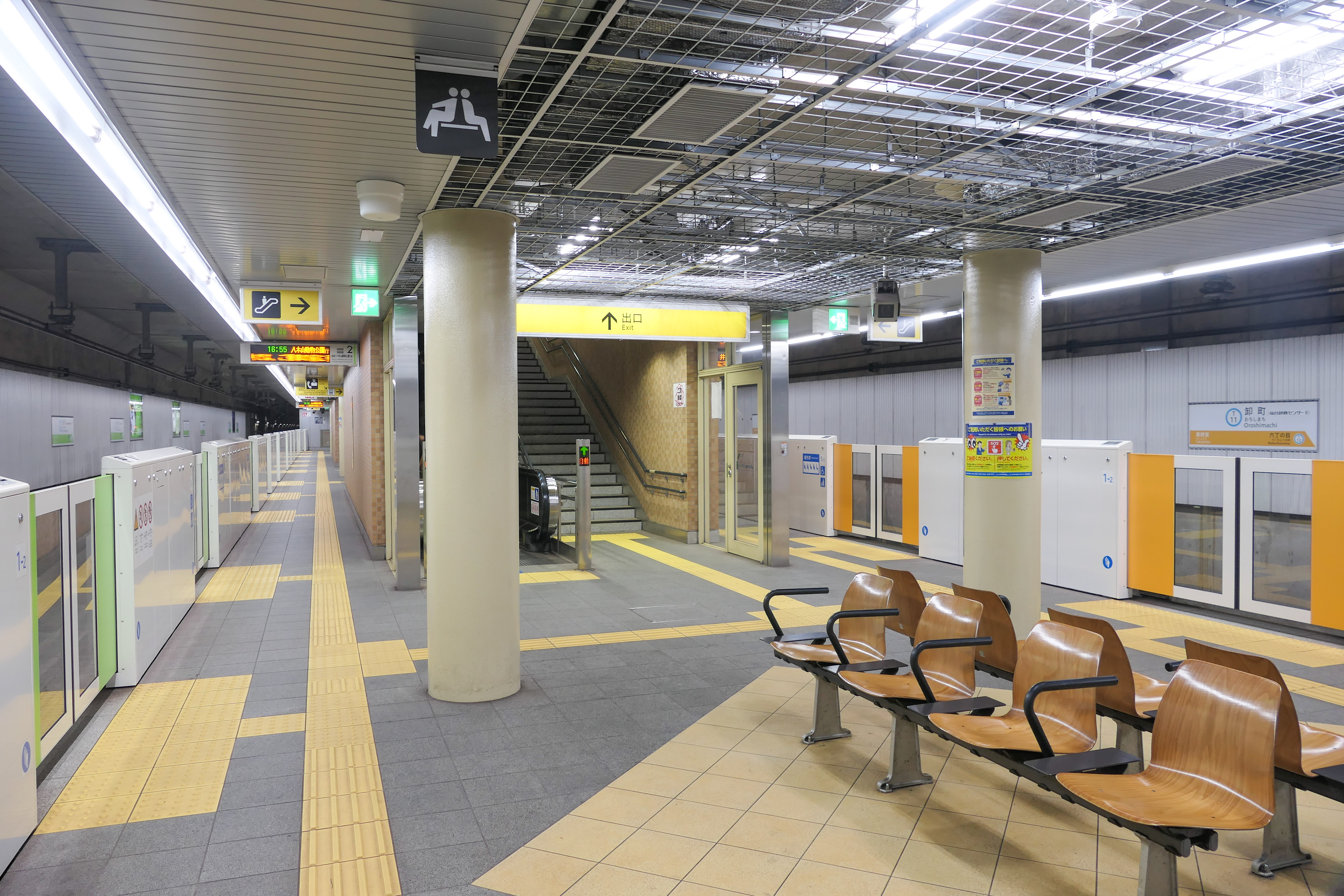
platform

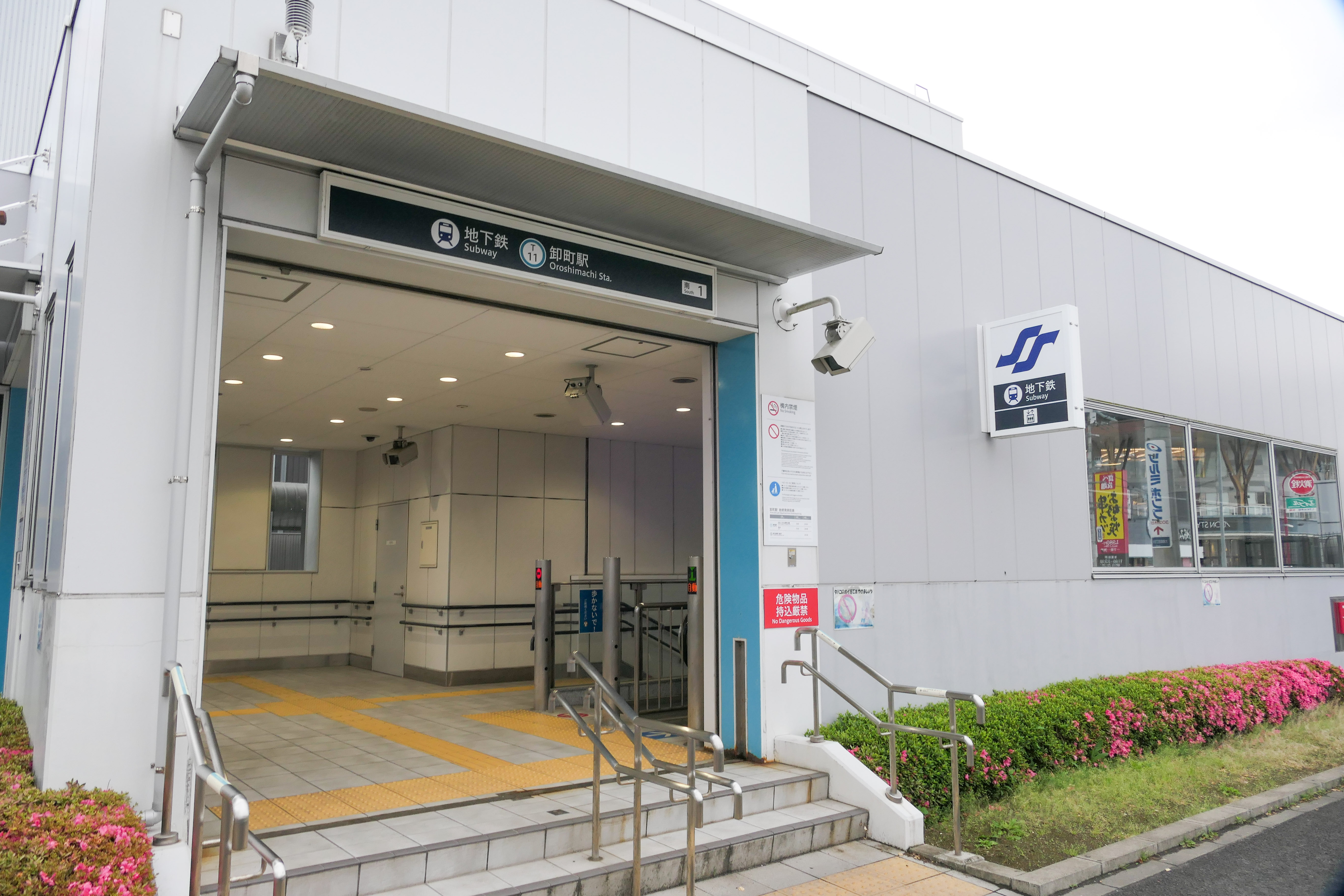
"South 1" entrance

== Staffing ==
The station is staffed and operated by sub-contracted employees from the security company Alsok.

== History ==
The station opened on 6 December 2015, coinciding with the opening of the Tōzai Line.

== Passenger statistics ==
In fiscal 2015, the station was used by an average of 2,824 passengers daily.

== See also ==
- List of railway stations in Japan
