= Kuwagawa Station =

Railway station in Murakami, Niigata Prefecture, Japan

Kuwagawa Station 桑川駅
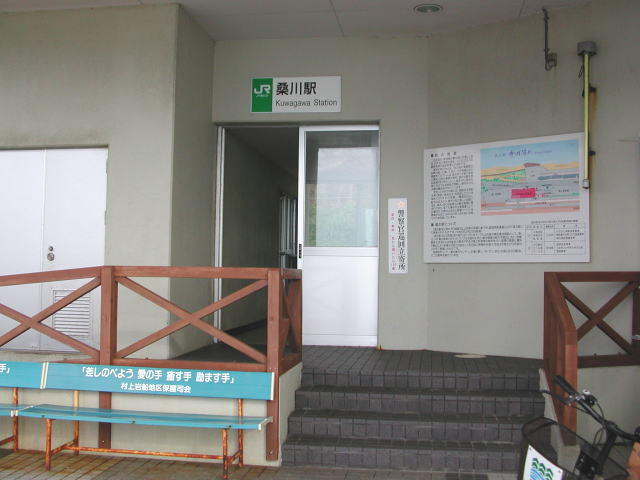
- Kuwagawa Station, September 2004

General information
- Location: 892-5 Kuwagawa, Murakami-shi, Niigata-ken 959-3665; Japan
- Coordinates: 38°22′30.55″N 139°27′31.8″E
- Operator: JR East
- Line: ■ Uetsu Main Line
- Distance: 78.3 km from Niitsu
- Platforms: 1 side + 1 island platforms
- Tracks: 3

Other information
- Status: Unstaffed
- Website: www.jreast.co.jp/estation/station/info.aspx?StationCd=643

History
- Opened: 31 July 1924

Services
Preceding station	JR East	Following station
Echigo-Hayakawa towards Niitsu	Uetsu Main Line	Imagawa towards Akita
Location
- Location within Japan

Kuwagawa Station (桑川駅, Kuwagawa eki) is a railway station in the city of Murakami, Niigata, Japan, operated by East Japan Railway Company (JR East).

== Lines ==
Kuwagawa Station is served by the Uetsu Main Line, and is 78.3 kilometers from the starting point of the line at Niitsu Station.

== Station layout ==
The station consists of one side platform and one island platform connected by a footbridge. The station is unattended. The station building is also a roadside station for Japan National Route 345.

=== Platforms ===
1	■ Uetsu Main Line	for Tsuruoka and Sakata
2	■ Uetsu Main Line	(siding)
3	■ Uetsu Main Line	for Niigata and Niitsu

== History ==
Kuwagawa Station opened on 31 July 1924. With the privatization of Japanese National Railways (JNR) on 1 April 1987, the station came under the control of JR East. A new station building was completed in 1993.

== Surrounding area ==
- National Route 345

== See also ==
- List of railway stations in Japan
