= Nishibukuro Station =

Railway station in Shōnai, Yamagata Prefecture, Japan

Nishibukuro Station 西袋駅
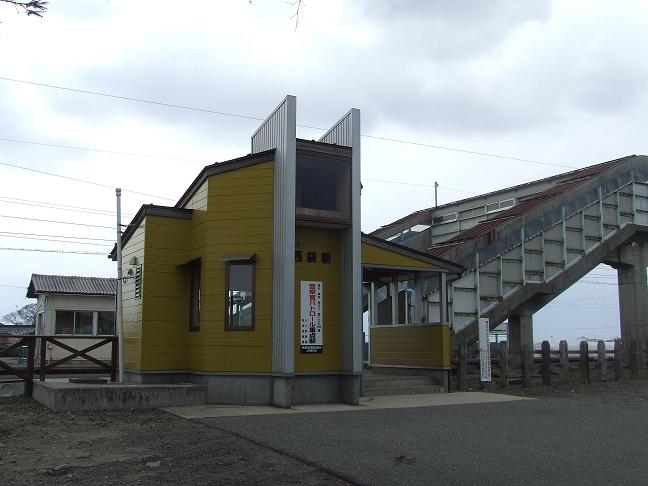
- Nishibukuro Station (April 2010)

General information
- Location: Nishibukuro, Shōnai-machi, Higashitagawa-gun, Yamagata-ken 999-7746; Japan
- Coordinates: 38°48′41.5″N 139°54′27.9″E
- Operator: JR East
- Line: ■ Uetsu Main Line
- Distance: 151.1 kilometers from Niitsu
- Platforms: 1 side platform

Other information
- Status: Unstaffed
- Website: Official website

History
- Opened: March 15, 1950

Services
Preceding station	JR East	Following station
Fujishima towards Niitsu	Uetsu Main Line	Amarume towards Akita
Location
- Location within Yamagata Prefecture Location within Japan

Nishibukuro Station (西袋駅, Nishibukuro-eki) is a railway station located in the town of Shōnai, Yamagata Prefecture, Japan, operated by the East Japan Railway Company (JR East).

== Lines ==
Nishibukuro Station is served by the Uetsu Main Line, and is located 151.1 rail kilometers from the terminus of the line at Niitsu Station.

== Station layout ==
The station has two opposed side platforms connected by a footbridge. The station is unattended.

=== Platforms ===
1	■ Uetsu Main Line	for Tsuruoka, Atsumi Onsen and Murakami
2	■ Uetsu Main Line	for Amarume, Sakata and Akita

== History ==
Nishibukuro Station began as the Minami-Amarume Signal (南余目信号場) on June 1, 1944, and was elevated to a full station on March 15, 1950. With the privatization of the JNR on April 1, 1987, the station came under the control of the East Japan Railway Company.

== Surrounding area ==
- Nishibukuro Post Office

== See also ==
- List of railway stations in Japan
