= Inaho =

Train service in Japan

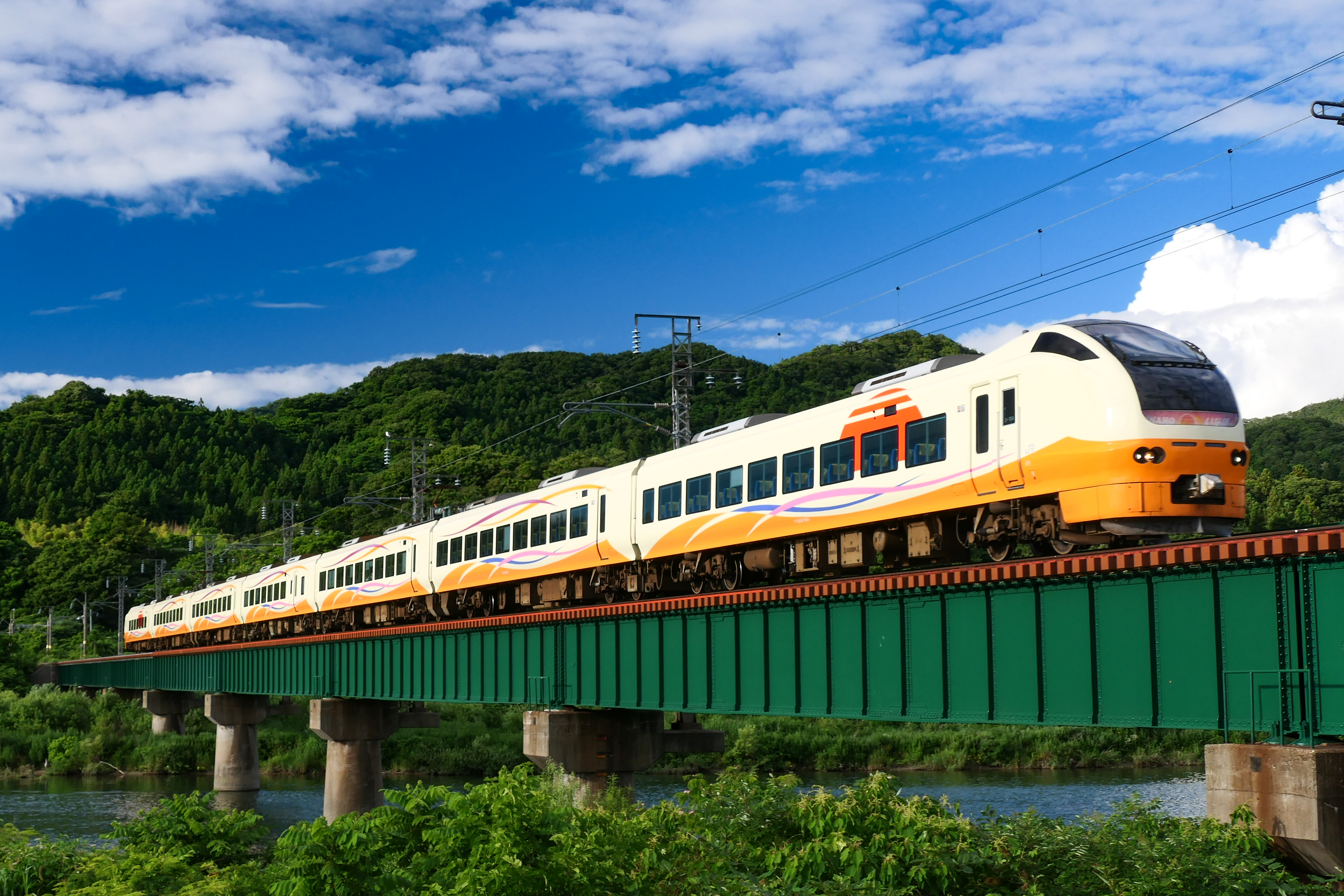
- E653-1000 series EMU set U104 on Inaho in 2022

Overview
- Service type: Limited express
- Status: In operation
- Locale: Hakushin Line, Uetsu Main Line, Ōu Main Line
- First service: 1 October 1969
- Current operator(s): JR East
- Former operator(s): JNR

Route
- Termini: Niigata; Akita
- Stops: 16
- Distance travelled: 271.7 km (168.8 mi)
- Average journey time: Approx. 3 hours 40 minutes
- Service frequency: 7 return services daily

On-board services
- Class(es): Green + standard
- Disabled access: Yes
- Sleeping arrangements: None
- Observation facilities: None
- Entertainment facilities: None
- Other facilities: Toilets

Technical
- Rolling stock: E653-1000 series EMUs
- Track gauge: 1,067 mm (3 ft 6 in)
- Electrification: Yes
- Operating speed: 120 km/h (75 mph)
- Track owner(s): JR East

The Inaho (いなほ) is a limited express train service in Japan operated by East Japan Railway Company (JR East), which runs from Niigata to Sakata and Akita. The train runs along the Uetsu Main Line with views on the coast and Dewa Range.

== Service pattern ==
Three return workings daily operate between Niigata and Akita, with a further four return workings between Niigata and Sakata.

Inaho services stop at the following stations:

Niigata - Toyosaka - Shibata - Nakajō - Sakamachi - Murakami - Fuya - Atsumi Onsen - Tsuruoka - Amarume - Sakata - Yuza - Kisakata - Nikaho - Ugo-Honjō - Akita.

== Rolling stock ==
Since 12 July 2014, all regular Inaho services are operated by seven-car E653-1000 series EMUs displaced from Fresh Hitachi services on the Joban Line. The first set was phased in on Inaho services from the start of the revised timetable on 28 September 2013. The E653 series trains are modified with the addition of a Green (first class) car and a new livery evoking images of the sunset, rice plants, and the sea.

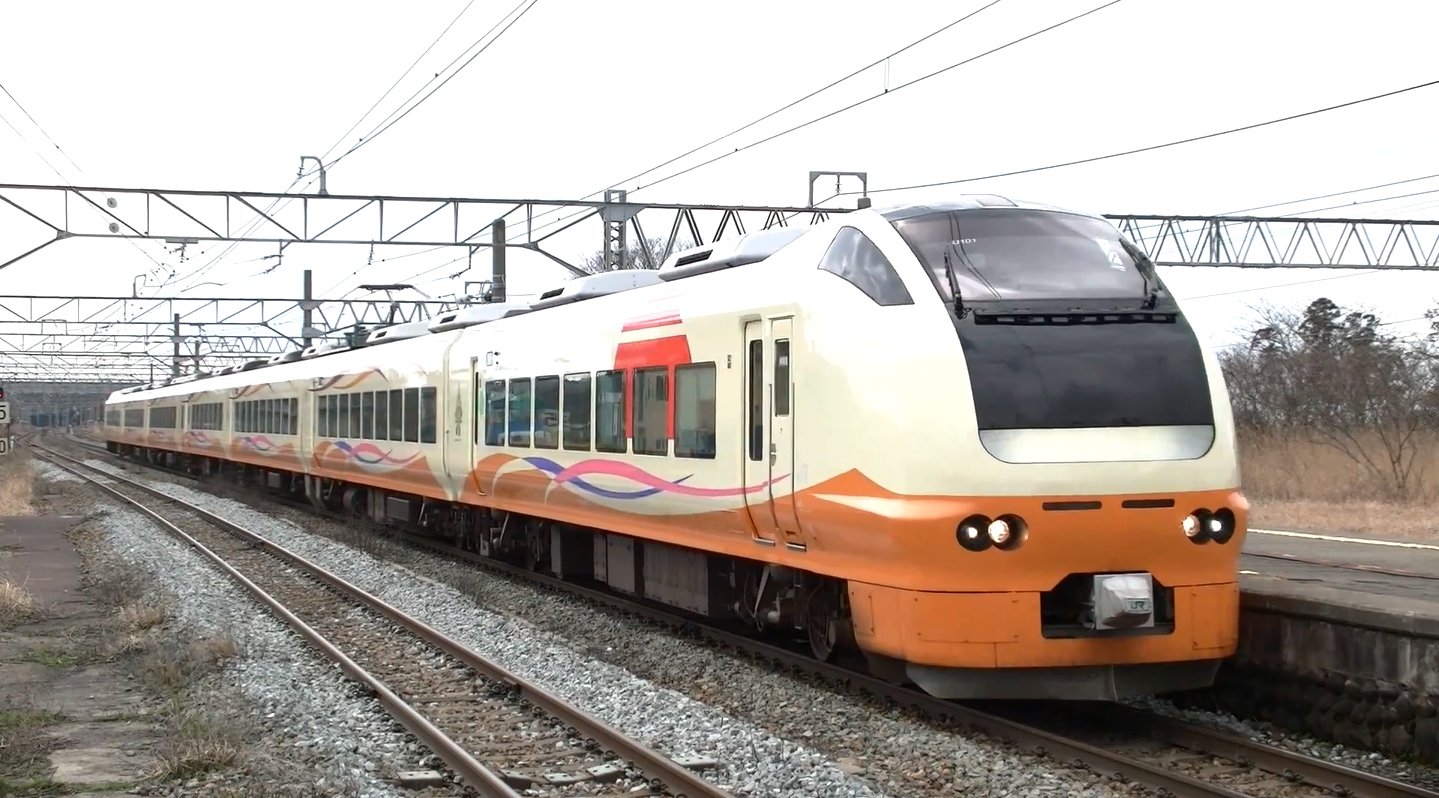
E653-1000 series EMU set U101 on an Inaho service in March 2014

=== Former rolling stock ===
Inaho services were previously operated by six-car 485 or refurbished 485-3000 series electric multiple unit (EMU) trains based at Niigata Depot, but these trains were replaced by E653-1000 series sets from 12 July 2014.

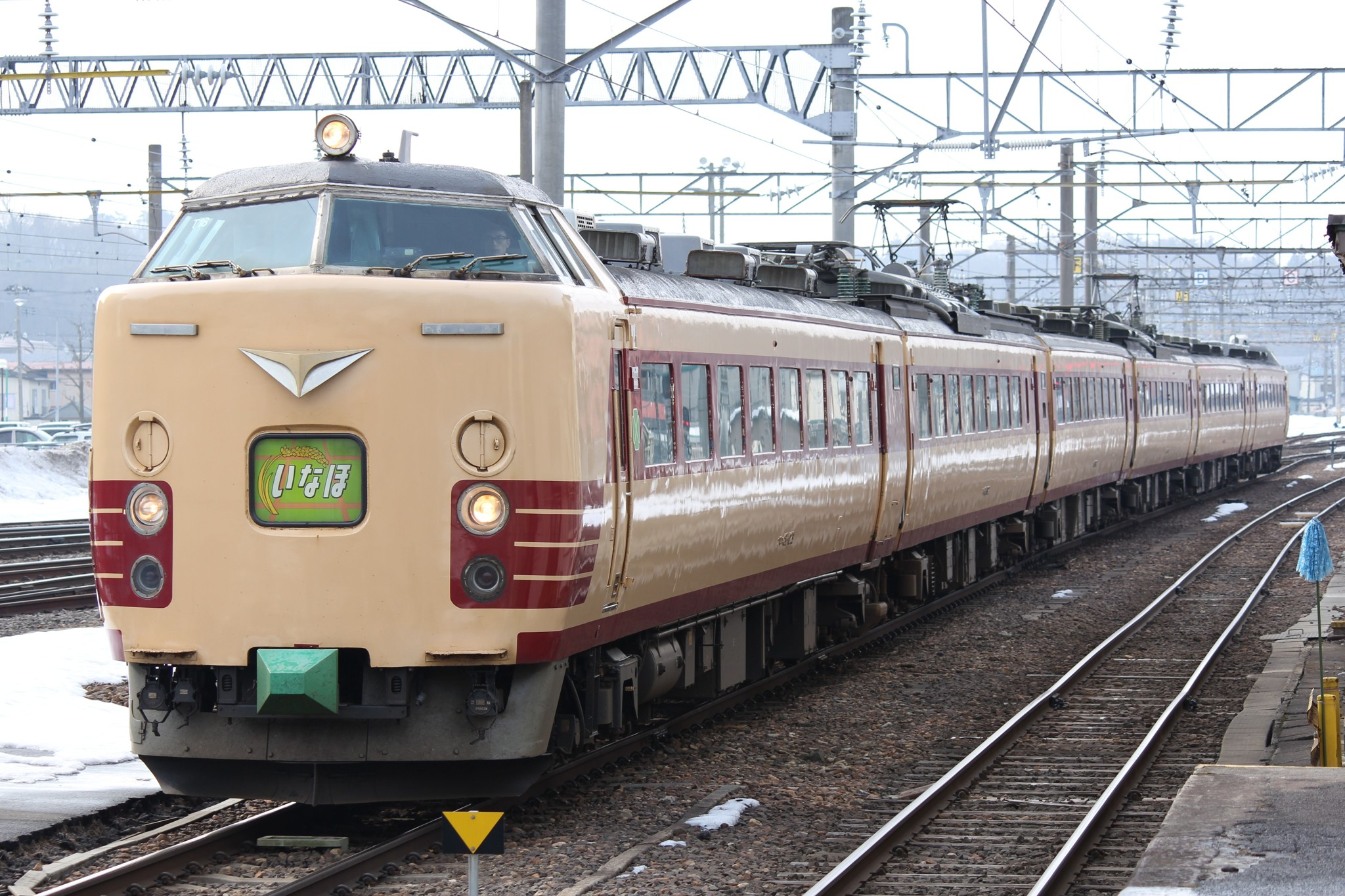
A 485 series EMU on an Inaho service in JNR livery in March 2012

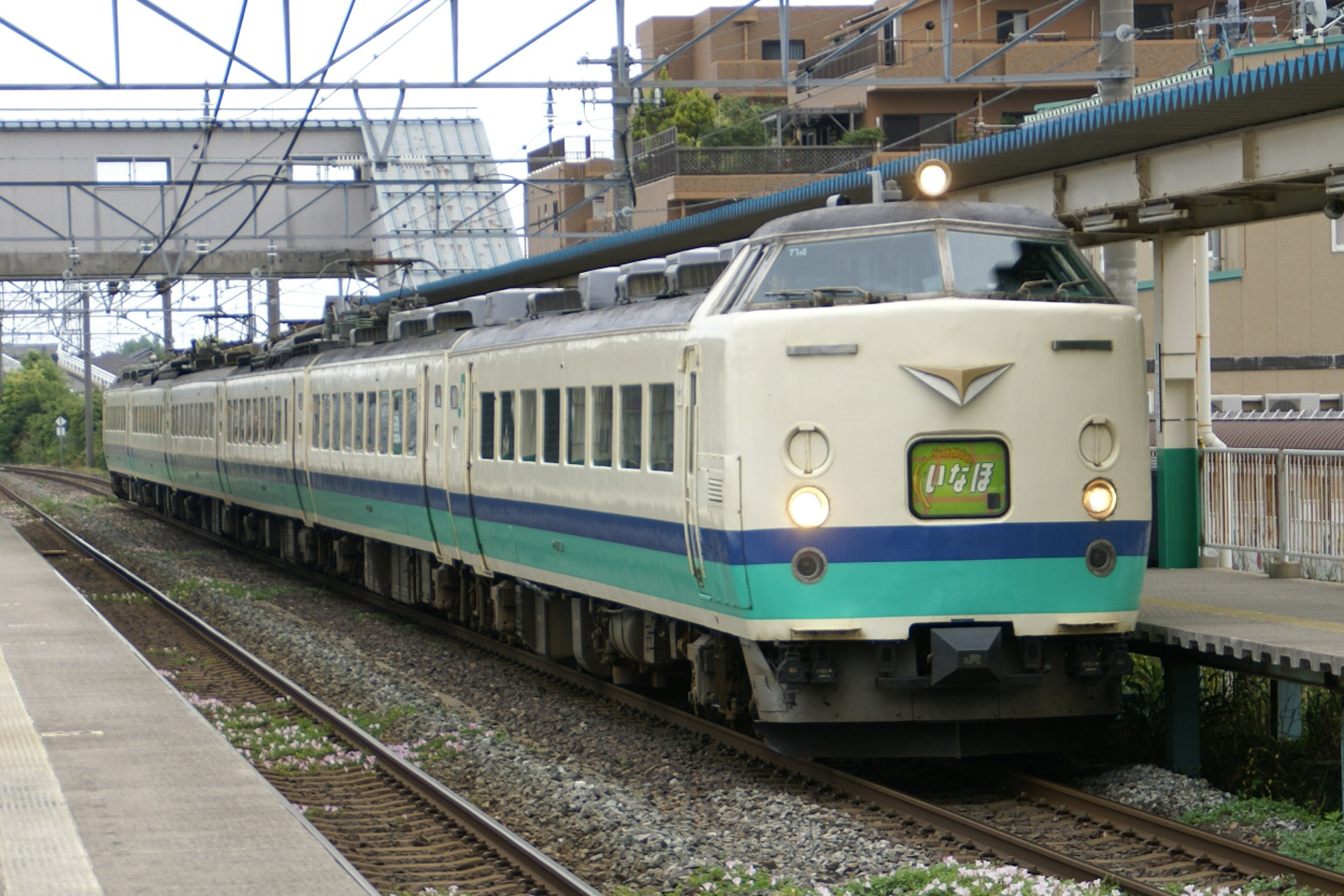
485 series EMU on an Inaho service in May 2008

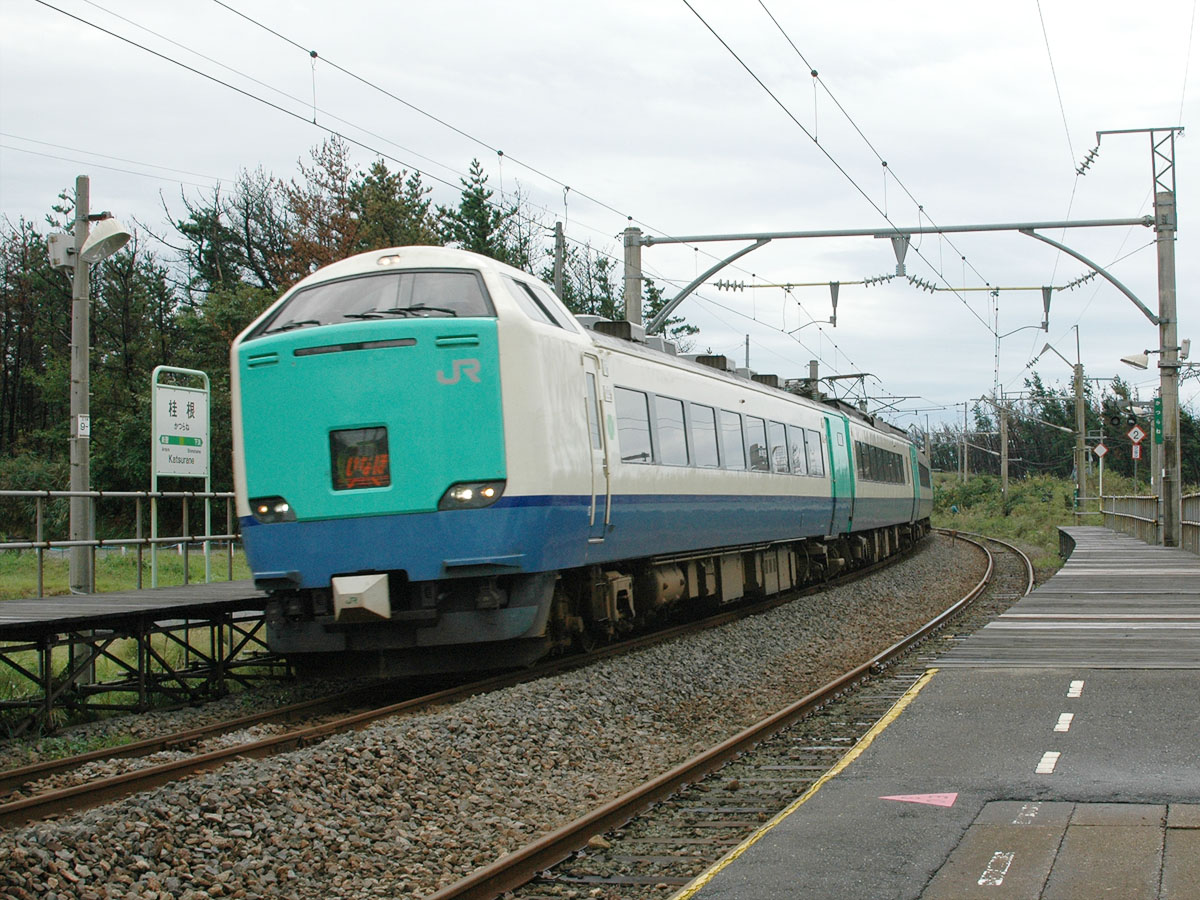
485-3000 series EMU on an Inaho service in September 2005

== Formations ==
Services are operated by 7-car E653-1000 series sets, formed as follows, with car 1 at the Akita end and car 7 at the Niigata end. All cars are no smoking.

Car No.	1	2	3	4	5	6	7
Numbering	KuRo E652-1000	MoHa E653-1000	MoHa E652-1000	SaHa E653-1000	MoHa E653-1000	MoHa E652-1000	KuHa E653-1000
Accommodation	Green	Reserved	Reserved	Reserved	Non-reserved	Non-reserved	Non-reserved

Seating in the E653 series Green cars is arranged 2+1, with 18 seats in total.

== History ==
The Inaho was first introduced from 1 October 1969 as a limited express service operating between Ueno in Tokyo and Akita via Niigata. Trains were formed of 7-car KiHa 80 series DMUs, with one service in each direction daily.

The original schedule was as follows.

- Down: Ueno (dep. 1350) → Sakata (arr. 2028) → Akita (arr. 2200)
- Up: Akita (dep. 0925) → Sakata (arr. 1056) → Ueno (arr. 1740)

From March 1972, train formations were extended to 9 cars to cope with demand. From October of the same year, the original DMUs were replaced by 485 series EMUs following electrification of the entire route. At the same time, service frequency was increased to two return workings daily, with one service extended to Aomori. Electrification enabled journey times between Ueno and Akita to be reduced to approximately 7 hours 30 minutes, and increasing demand resulted in formations being lengthened to 12 cars, with non-reserved seating cars added from October 1978, and a third daily return service added from July 1979.

The typical 12-car formation was as follows, with car 1 at the Ueno end.

Car No.	1	2	3	4	5	6	7	8	9	10	11	12
Accommodation	Reserved	Green	Reserved	Reserved	Reserved	Reserved	Restaurant	Reserved	Reserved	Reserved	Reserved	Reserved

From 15 November 1982, following the opening of the Jōetsu Shinkansen, two of the return Inaho services were discontinued, and the third return service remaining between Ueno and Akita via Niitsu was renamed Chōkai (鳥海). From this date, Inaho train services were amended to run as five return workings daily between Niigata and Akita (with one service extended to/from Aomori) using 9-car 485 series EMUs with no restaurant car facilities.

From March 1985, train formations were reduced to 6-car monoclass sets, although from November 1986, service frequency was increased from five to seven return workings daily.

Green (first class) car accommodation was added to half of one car following privatization of JNR to become JR East.

From the start of the 4 December 2010 timetable revision, services were further shortened to operate between Niigata and Akita, with some trains terminating at Sakata. Former operations between Akita and Aomori were covered instead by extended Tsugaru services.

By 2012, services formed of 6-car 485 series sets were formed as follows, with car 1 at the Sakata end and car 6 at the Niigata end. All cars were no smoking.

Car No.	1		2	3	4	5	6
Numbering	KuRoHa 481		MoHa 484	MoHa 485	MoHa 484	MoHa 485	KuHa 481
Accommodation	Green	Reserved	Reserved	Reserved	Non-reserved	Non-reserved	Non-reserved
Facilities		Toilet	Toilet	Toilet	Toilet	Phone	Toilet

From 28 September 2013, refurbished E653-1000 series 7-car sets formerly used on Fresh Hitachi services were phased in on Inaho services, initially on just one return working a day.

From the start of the revised timetable on 15 March 2014, a further four return workings daily were operated by refurbished E653-1000 series EMUs, leaving 485 series sets on two return services between Niigata and Sakata. From 12 July 2014, all regular Inaho services were operated by E653-1000 series EMUs.

== Accident ==
On 25 December 2005, the 485 series train executing the Inaho 14 service from Akita to Niigata was derailed and overturned by strong winds in the vicinity of the No. 2 Mogami River bridge between Kita-Amarume and Sagoshi stations while travelling at a speed of approximately 100 km/h. The front three cars overturned and rolled down the embankment, hitting a concrete structure below. The rear three cars were also derailed but remained upright. A total of 46 people were aboard the train, including three staff members. Five passengers were killed in the accident, and 33 people sustained injuries (including two staff members). Heavy snow and winds hampered recovery efforts, and the train was not removed from the accident scene until 1 January 2006. The line was reopened to traffic on 19 January 2006.

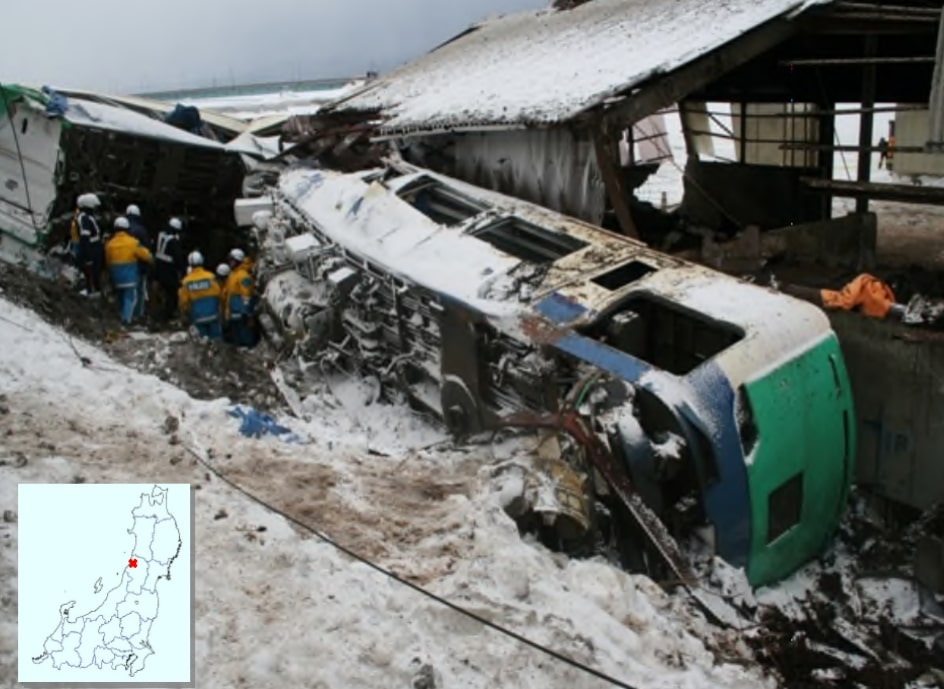
The destroyed train in the aftermath of the accident.

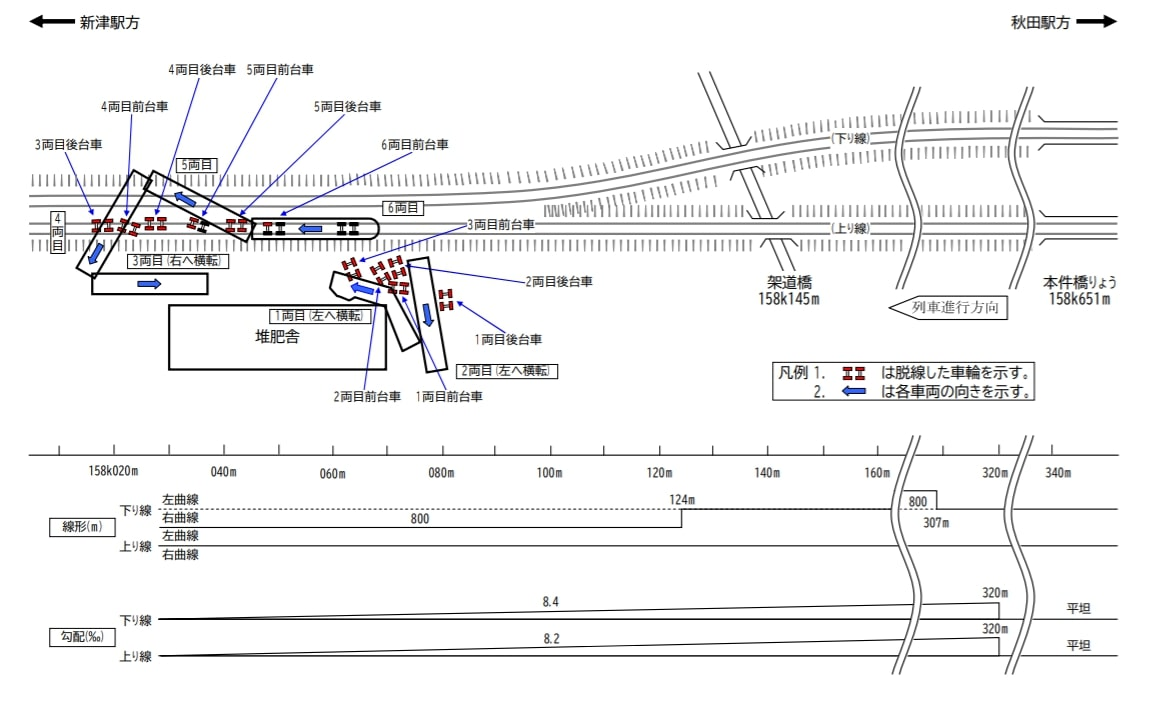
Schematic of the derailment.

== See also ==
- List of named passenger trains of Japan
