= Ugo-Ushijima Station =

Railway station in Akita, Akita Prefecture, Japan

Ugo Ushijima Station 羽後牛島駅
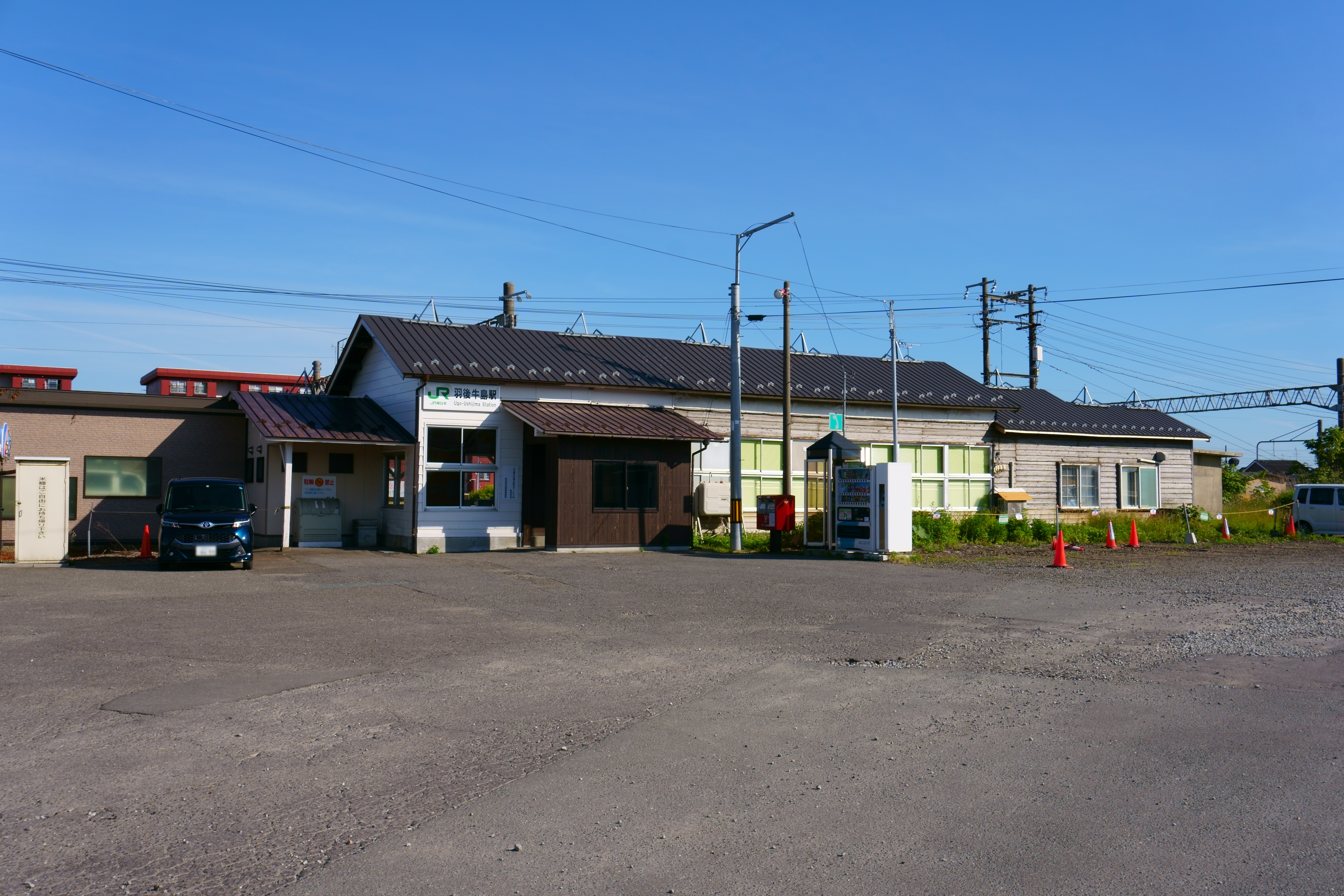
- Ugo Ushijima Station in June 2018

General information
- Location: 1-4-17, Ushijima-Nishi, Akita-shi, Akita-ken, 010-0063; Japan
- Coordinates: 39°41′46.16″N 140°6′58.43″E
- Operator: JR East
- Line: ■ Uetsu Main Line
- Distance: 269.0 kilometers from Niitsu
- Platforms: 1 island platform

Other information
- Status: Staffed (Midori no Madoguchi)
- Website: Official website

History
- Opened: July 31, 1921

Passengers
- FY2018: 921

Services
Preceding station	JR East	Following station
Araya towards Niitsu	Uetsu Main Line	Akita Terminus
Location
- Location within Akita Prefecture Location within Japan

Ugo-Ushijima Station (羽後牛島駅, Ugo-Ushijima eki) is a railway station in the city of Akita, Akita Prefecture Japan, operated by JR East.

== Lines ==
Ugo-Ushijima Station is served by the Uetsu Main Line and is located 269.0 kilometres (167.1 mi) from the terminus of the line at Niitsu Station.

== Station layout ==
The station has one island platform connected to the station building by an underground passage.

The station is staffed and has a Midori no Madoguchi ticket office.

=== Platforms ===
1	■ Uetsu Main Line	for Akita
2	■ Uetsu Main Line	for Sakata and Tsuruoka

== History ==
Ugo-Ushijima Station opened on July 31, 1921, as a station on the Japanese Government Railways (JGR) Rikuusai Line, serving the town of Ushijima, Akita. It was switched to the control of the JGR Uetsu Main Line on April 20, 1924. The current station building was completed in June 1944. The JGR became the JNR (Japan National Railway) after World War II. With the privatization of the JNR on April 1, 1987, the station came under the joint control of the East Japan Railway Company and the Japan Freight Railway Company. All freight operations were suspended after April 1, 2006.

== Passenger statistics ==
In fiscal 2018, the station was used by an average of 760 passengers daily (boarding passengers only). The passenger figures for previous years are as shown below.

Fiscal year	Daily average
2000	877
2005	791
2010	734
2015	670

== Surrounding area ==
- National Route 13
- Akita Minami High School
- Ushijima Elementary School

== See also ==
- List of railway stations in Japan
