= Sagoshi Station =

Railway station in Sakata, Yamagata Prefecture, Japan

Sagoshi Station 砂越駅
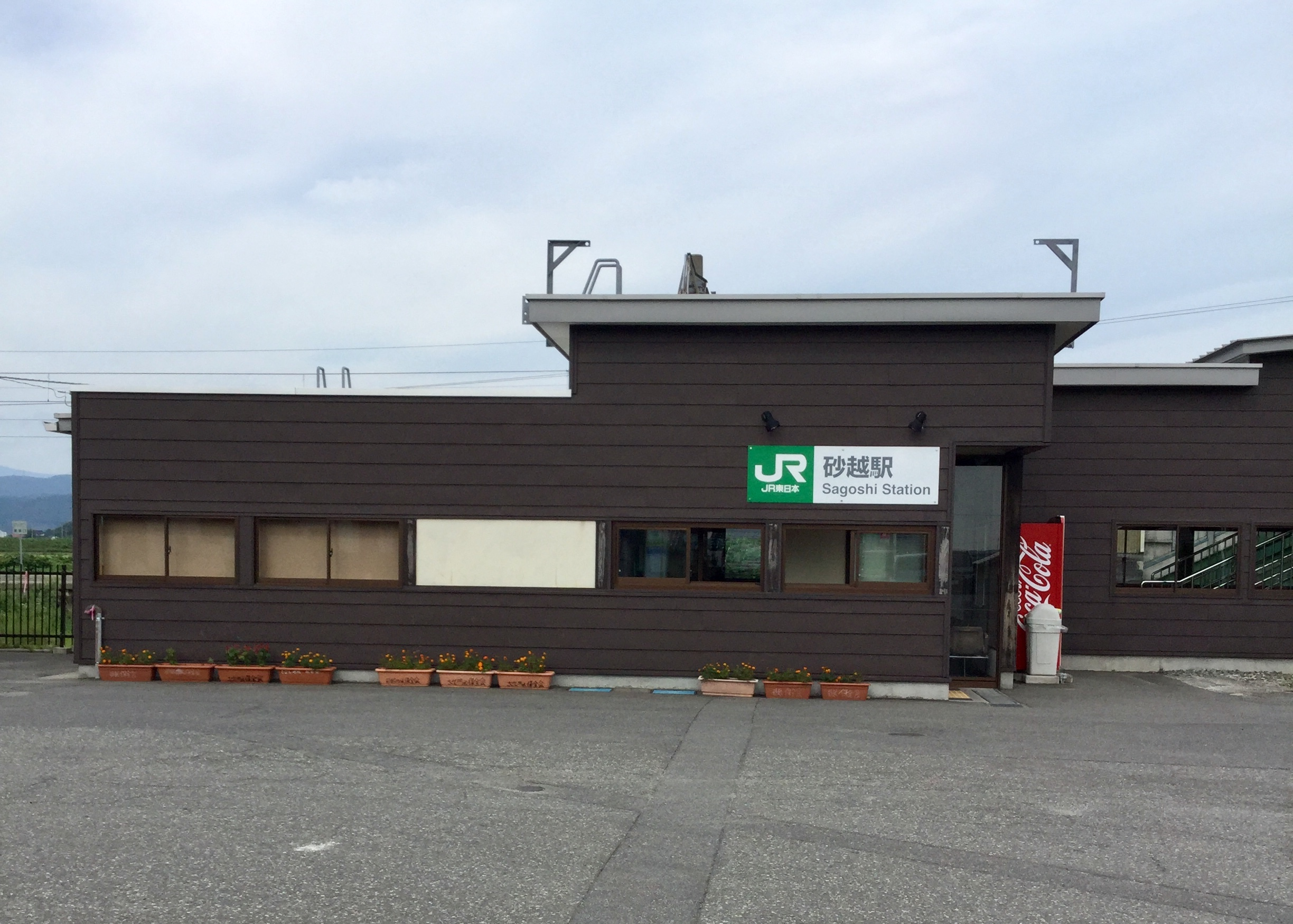
- Sagoshi Station in August 2019

General information
- Location: Sagoshi, Sakata-shi, Yamagata-ken 999-6701; Japan
- Coordinates: 38°53′42″N 139°54′26″E
- Operator: JR East
- Lines: ■ Uetsu Main Line; ■ Rikuu West Line
- Distance: 160.4 km from Niitsu
- Platforms: 2 side platforms

Other information
- Status: Unstaffed
- Website: www.jreast.co.jp/estation/station/info.aspx?StationCd=741

History
- Opened: 24 December 1914

Passengers
- FY2012: 190 daily

Services
Preceding station	JR East	Following station
Kita-Amarume towards Niitsu	Uetsu Main Line	Higashi-Sakata towards Akita
Kita-Amarume towards Shinjō	Rikuu West Line Local	Higashi-Sakata towards Sakata
Location
- Location within Yamagata Prefecture Location within Japan

Sagoshi Station (砂越駅, Sagoshi eki) is a railway station in the city of Sakata, Yamagata, Japan, operated by East Japan Railway Company (JR East).

== Lines ==
Sagoshi Station is served by the Uetsu Main Line and is located 160.4 rail kilometers from the starting point of that line at Niitsu Station. Trains of the Rikuu West Line also continue past the nominal terminus of that line at Amarume Station towards Sakata, stopping at this station en route.

== Station layout ==
Sagoshi Station has two opposed side platforms connected by a footbridge. The station is unstaffed.

=== Platforms ===
1	■ Uetsu Main Line	for Tsuruoka and Sakata
	■ Rikuu West Line	for Sakata
2	■ Uetsu Main Line	for Ugo-Honjō and Akita
	■ Rikuu West Line	for Shinjō and Furukuchi

== History ==
Sagoshi Station opened on 24 December 1914. With the privatization of Japanese National Railways (JNR) on April 1, 1987, the station came under the control of JR East.

== Surrounding area ==
- former Hirata Town Hall

== See also ==
- List of railway stations in Japan
