= Uzen-Ōyama Station =

Railway station in Tsuruoka, Yamagata Prefecture, Japan

Uzen-Ōyama Station 羽前大山駅
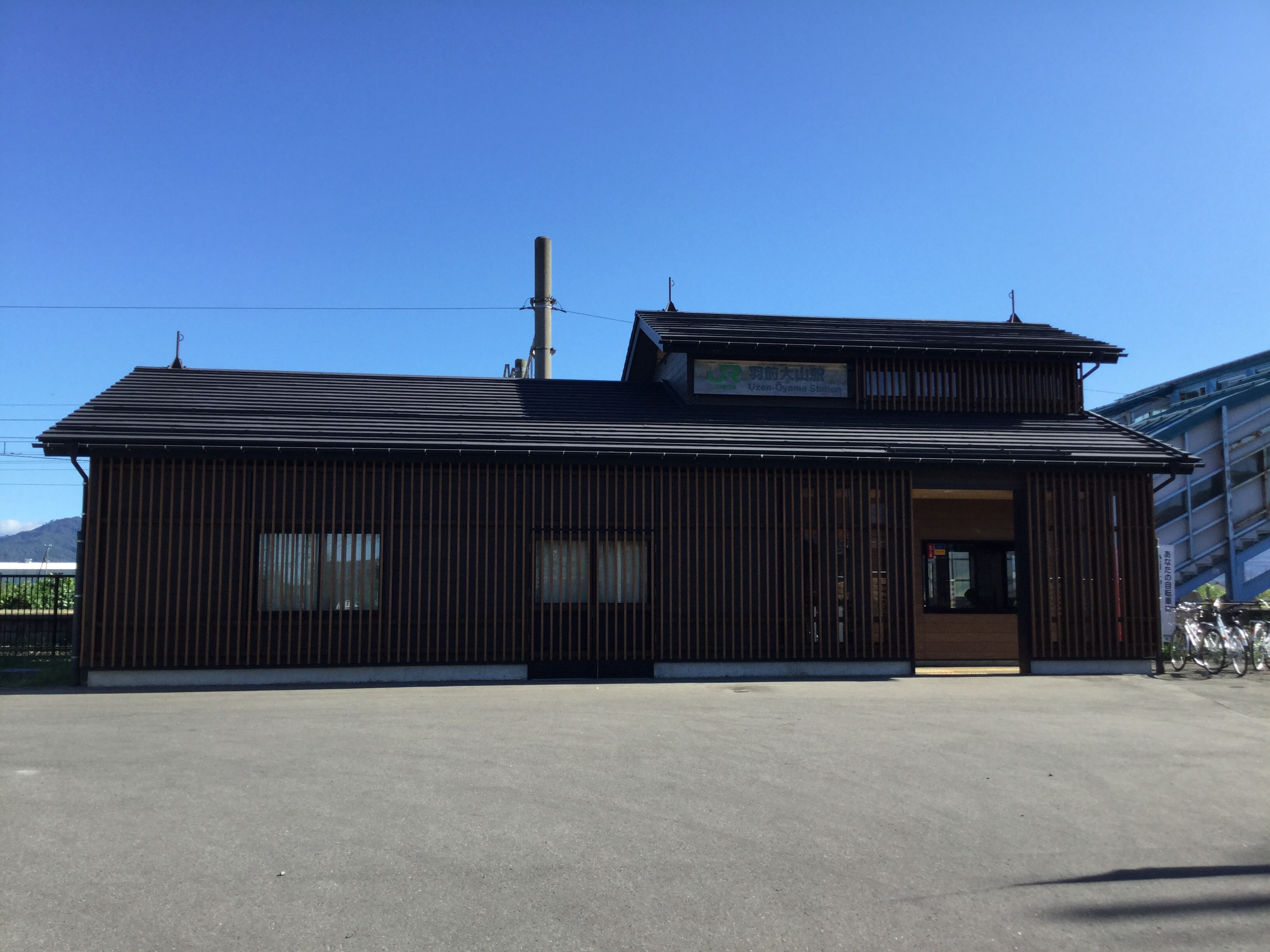
- Uzen-Ōyama Station (2019)

General information
- Location: 1-1, Ōyama 1-chōme, Tsuruoka-shi, Yamagata-ken 997-1124; Japan
- Coordinates: 38°44′32″N 139°46′1.3″E
- Operator: JR East
- Line: ■ Uetsu Main Line
- Distance: 133.4 kilometers from Niitsu
- Platforms: 1 island platform

Other information
- Status: Unstaffed
- Website: Official website

History
- Opened: December 5, 1919

Services
Preceding station	JR East	Following station
Uzen-Mizusawa towards Niitsu	Uetsu Main Line	Tsuruoka towards Akita
Location
- Location within Yamagata Prefecture Location within Japan

Uzen-Ōyama Station (羽前大山駅, Uzen-Ōyama eki) is a railway station located in the city of Tsuruoka, Yamagata, Japan, operated by East Japan Railway Company (JR East).

== Lines ==
Uzen-Ōyama Station is served by the Uetsu Main Line, and is located 133.4 kilometres (82.9 mi) rail kilometers from the terminus of the line at Niitsu Station.

== Station layout ==
The station has a single island platform connected to the station building by a footbridge. The station is unattended.

=== Platforms ===
1	■ Uetsu Main Line	for Tsuruoka, Amarume and Sakata
2	■ Uetsu Main Line	for Atsumi Onsen and Murakami

== History ==
Uzen-Ōyama Station was opened on December 5, 1919. With the privatization of the JNR on April 1, 1987, the station came under the control of the East Japan Railway Company. A new station building was completed in January 2011.

== Surrounding area ==
- Oyama Post Office

== See also ==
- List of railway stations in Japan
