= Higashi-Sakata Station =

Railway station in Sakata, Yamagata Prefecture, Japan

Higashi-Sakata Station 東酒田駅
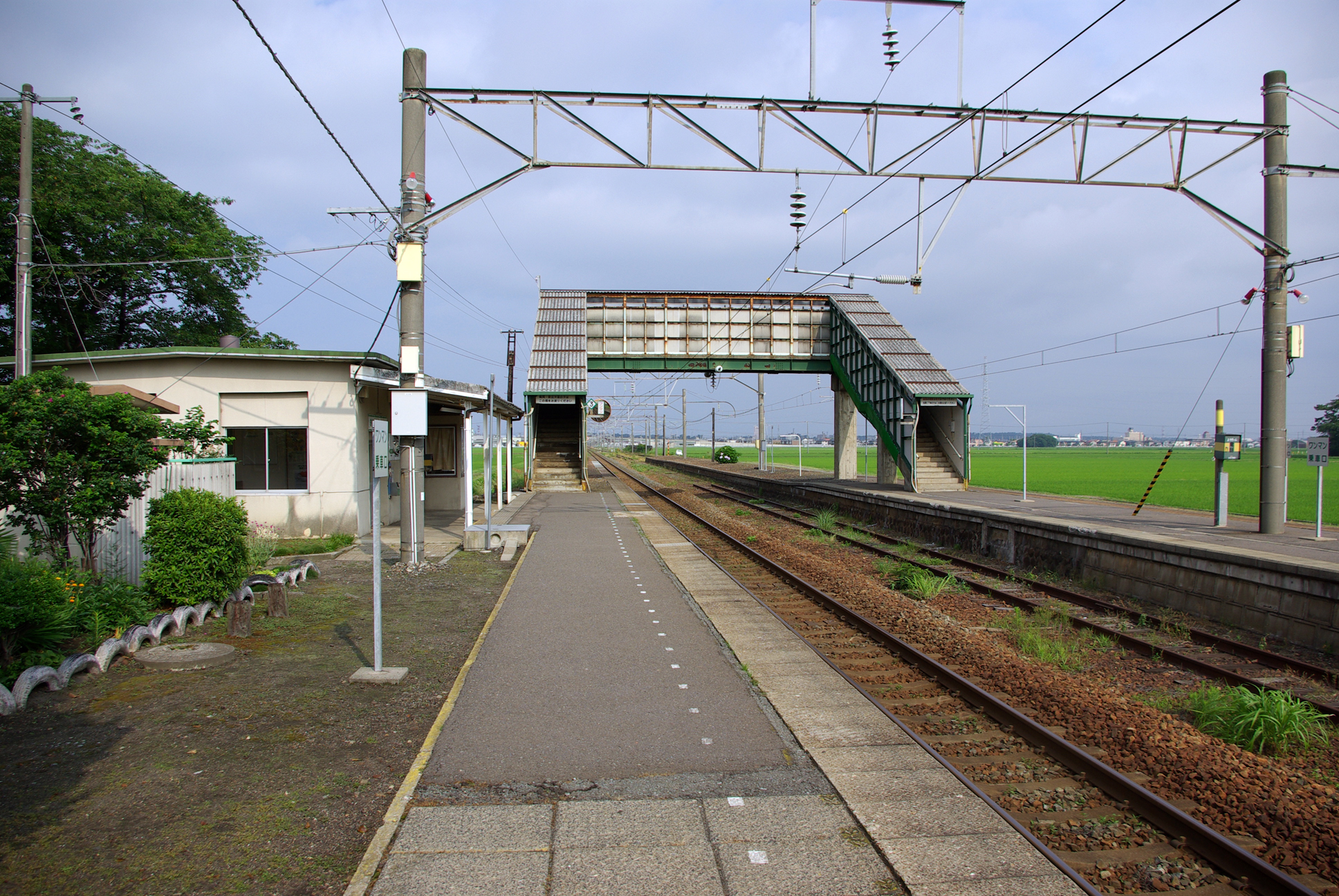
- Higashi-Sakata Station

General information
- Location: Omachi-aze Izumo 5, Sakata-shi, Yamagata-ken; Japan
- Coordinates: 38°54′27″N 139°52′32″E
- Operator: JR East
- Lines: ■ Uetsu Main Line; ■ Rikuu West Line
- Distance: 163.7 kilometers from Niitsu
- Platforms: 2 side platforms

Other information
- Status: Unstaffed
- Website: Official website

History
- Opened: December 25, 1958

Services
Preceding station	JR East	Following station
Sagoshi towards Niitsu	Uetsu Main Line	Sakata towards Akita
Sagoshi towards Shinjō	Rikuu West Line Local	Sakata Terminus
Location
- Location within Yamagata Prefecture Location within Japan

Higashi-Sakata Station (東酒田駅, Higashi-Sakata-eki) is a railway station located in the city of Sakata, Yamagata Prefecture, Japan, operated by the East Japan Railway Company (JR East).

== Lines ==
Higashi Sakata Station is served by the Uetsu Main Line and is located 163.7 rail kilometers from the starting point of that line at Niitsu Station. Trains of the Rikuu West Line also continue past the nominal terminus of that line at Amarume Station towards Sakata, stopping at this station en route.

== Station layout ==
The station has two opposed side platforms connected by a footbridge. The station is unattended.

=== Platforms ===
1	■ Uetsu Main Line	for Tsuruoka and Sakata
	■ Rikuu West Line	for Sakata
2	■ Uetsu Main Line	for Ugo-Honjō and Akita
	■ Rikuu West Line	for Shinjō and Furukuchi

== History ==
Higashi-Sakata Station began operations as the Higashi-Sakata Signal (東酒田信号場) on March 31, 1944, and was elevated to a full station on the JNR (Japan National Railway) on December 25, 1958. It has been unattended since September 1972. With the privatization of the JNR on April 1, 1987, the station came under the control of the East Japan Railway Company.

== Surrounding area ==
The station is located in a rural area surrounded by rice paddies.

== See also ==
- List of railway stations in Japan
