= Kita-Amarume Station =

Railway station in Shōnai, Yamagata Prefecture, Japan

Kita Amarume Station 北余目駅
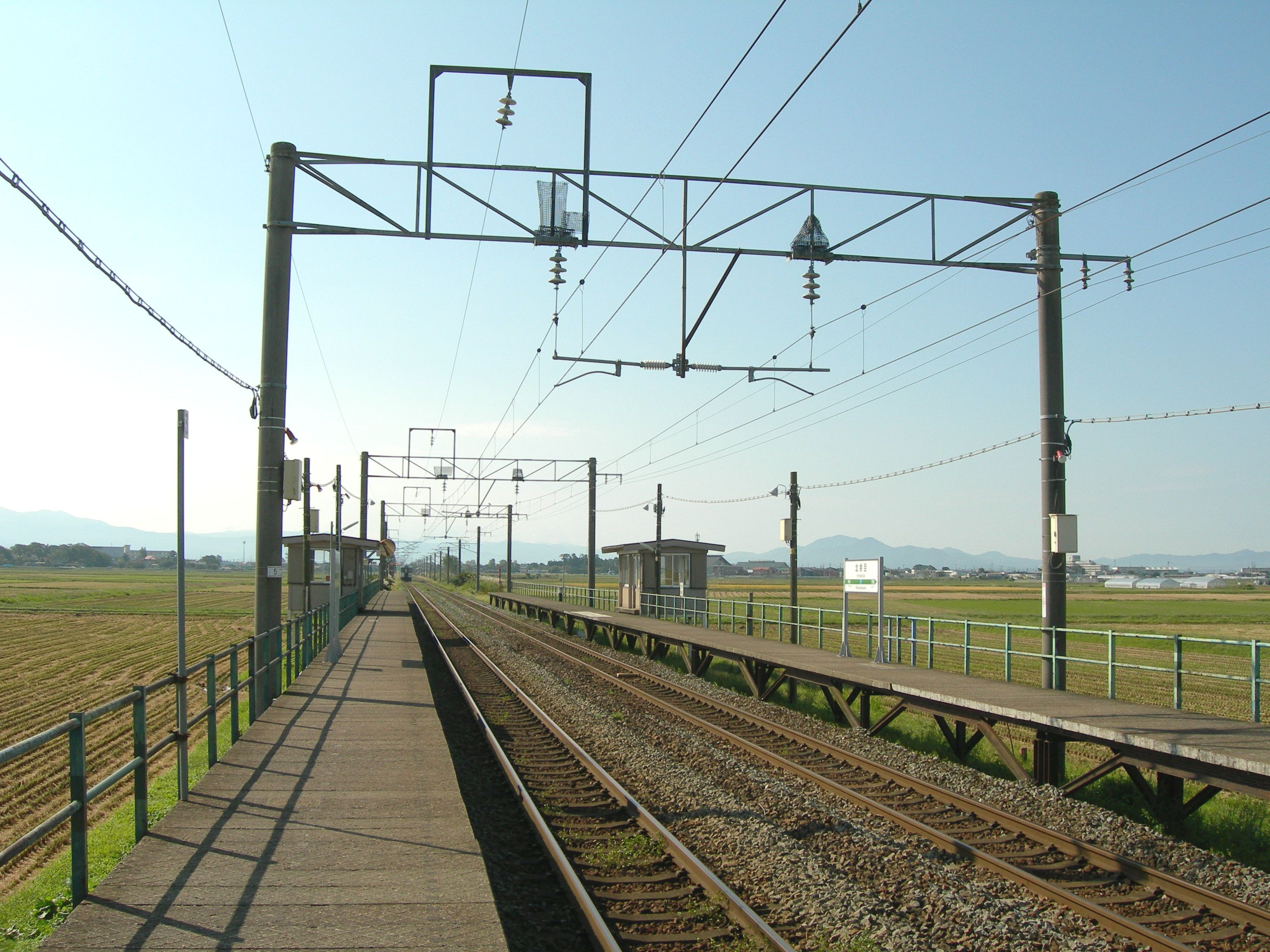
- Kita Amarume Station (April 2010)

General information
- Location: Hiraoka Otsubo, Shōnai-machi, Higashitagawa-gun, Yamagata-ken 999-7703; Japan
- Coordinates: 38°52′03″N 139°54′29″E
- Operator: JR East
- Lines: ■ Uetsu Main Line; ■ Rikuu West Line
- Distance: 157.4 kilometers from Niitsu
- Platforms: 2 side platforms

Other information
- Status: Unstaffed
- Website: Official website

History
- Opened: February 1, 1964

Services
Preceding station	JR East	Following station
Amarume towards Niitsu	Uetsu Main Line	Sagoshi towards Akita
Amarume towards Shinjō	Rikuu West Line Local	Sagoshi towards Sakata
Location
- Location within Yamagata Prefecture Location within Japan

Kita-Amarume Station (北余目駅, Kita-Amarume-eki) is a railway station located in the town of Shōnai, Yamagata Prefecture, Japan, operated by the East Japan Railway Company (JR East).

== Lines ==
Kita-Amarume Station is served by the Uetsu Main Line, and is located 157.4 rail kilometers from the terminus of the line at Niitsu Station. It is also served by trains of the Rikuu West Line, which continue past the nominal terminal of the line at Amarume Station en route to Sakata.

== Station layout ==
The station has two opposed side platforms connected by a level crossing. There is no station building. The station is unattended.

=== Platforms ===
1	■ Uetsu Main Line	for Sakata, Ugo-Honjō and Akita
2	■ Uetsu Main Line	for Amarume, Tsuruoka and Murakami
	■ Rikuu West Line	for Shinjō and Furukuchi

== History ==
Kita-Amarume Station was opened on February 1, 1964. With the privatization of the JNR on April 1, 1987, the station came under the control of the East Japan Railway Company. On December 25, 2005 a train from Sagoshi Station derailed in bad weather near this station, killing five and injuring thirty-three.

== Surrounding area ==
The station is located in a rural area surrounded by rice paddies. There are very few buildings in the vicinity of the station.

== See also ==
- List of railway stations in Japan
