= Mototate Station =

Railway station in Sakata, Yamagata Prefecture, Japan

Mototate Station 本楯駅
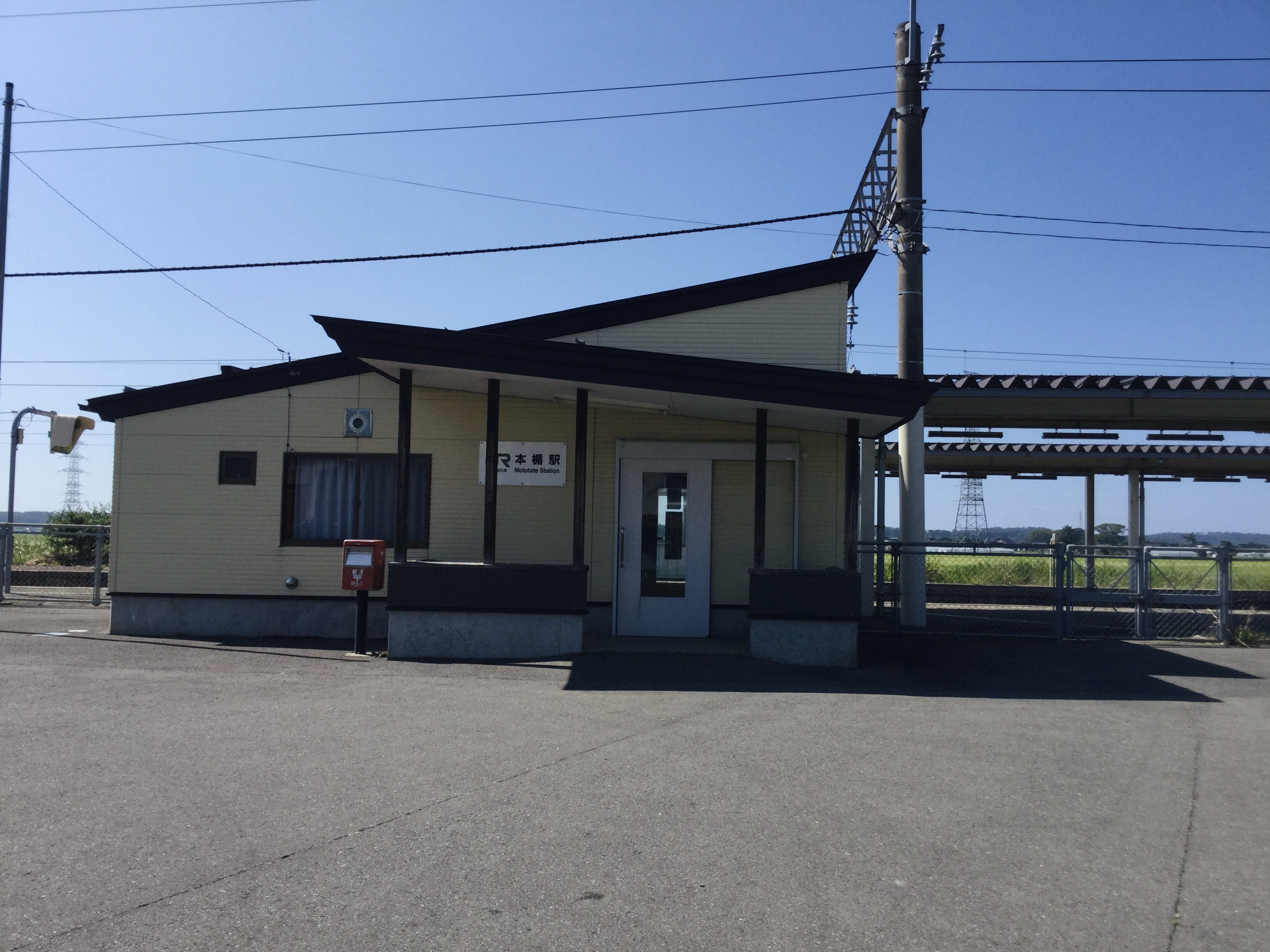
- Mototate Station, August 2019

General information
- Location: Tsūden-8 Mototate, Sakata-shi, Yamagata-ken 999–8134; Japan
- Coordinates: 38°58′6.8″N 139°52′56.4″E
- Operator: JR East
- Line: ■ Uetsu Main Line
- Distance: 173.3 kilometers from Niitsu
- Platforms: 2 side platforms

Other information
- Status: Unstaffed
- Website: Official website

History
- Opened: 5 December 1919

Services
Preceding station	JR East	Following station
Sakata towards Niitsu	Uetsu Main Line	Minamichōkai towards Akita
Location
- Location within Yamagata Prefecture Location within Japan

Mototate Station (本楯駅, Mototate-eki) is a railway station in the city of Sakata, Yamagata, Japan, operated by East Japan Railway Company (JR East).

== Lines ==
Mototate Station is located on the Uetsu Main Line, stretching from Niitsu to Akita, and is located 173.3 rail kilometers from the terminus of the line at Niitsu Station. The station is served by local services operating between Sakata and Akita, with some services starting or terminating at Fukura. Services operate approximately hourly during the daytime.

== Station layout ==
The station consists of two opposed side platforms serving two tracks. The two platforms are linked by a footbridge. The station is unattended.

=== Platforms ===
1	■ Uetsu Main Line	for Sakata and Tsuruoka
2	■ Uetsu Main Line	for Kisakata, Ugo-Honjō, and Akita

== History ==
Mototate Station opened on 5 December 1919. The station became unstaffed from October 1981. A new station building was completed in August 2006.

== Surrounding area ==
- Mototate Post Office

== See also ==
- List of railway stations in Japan
