= Uetsu Main Line =

Railway line in Japan

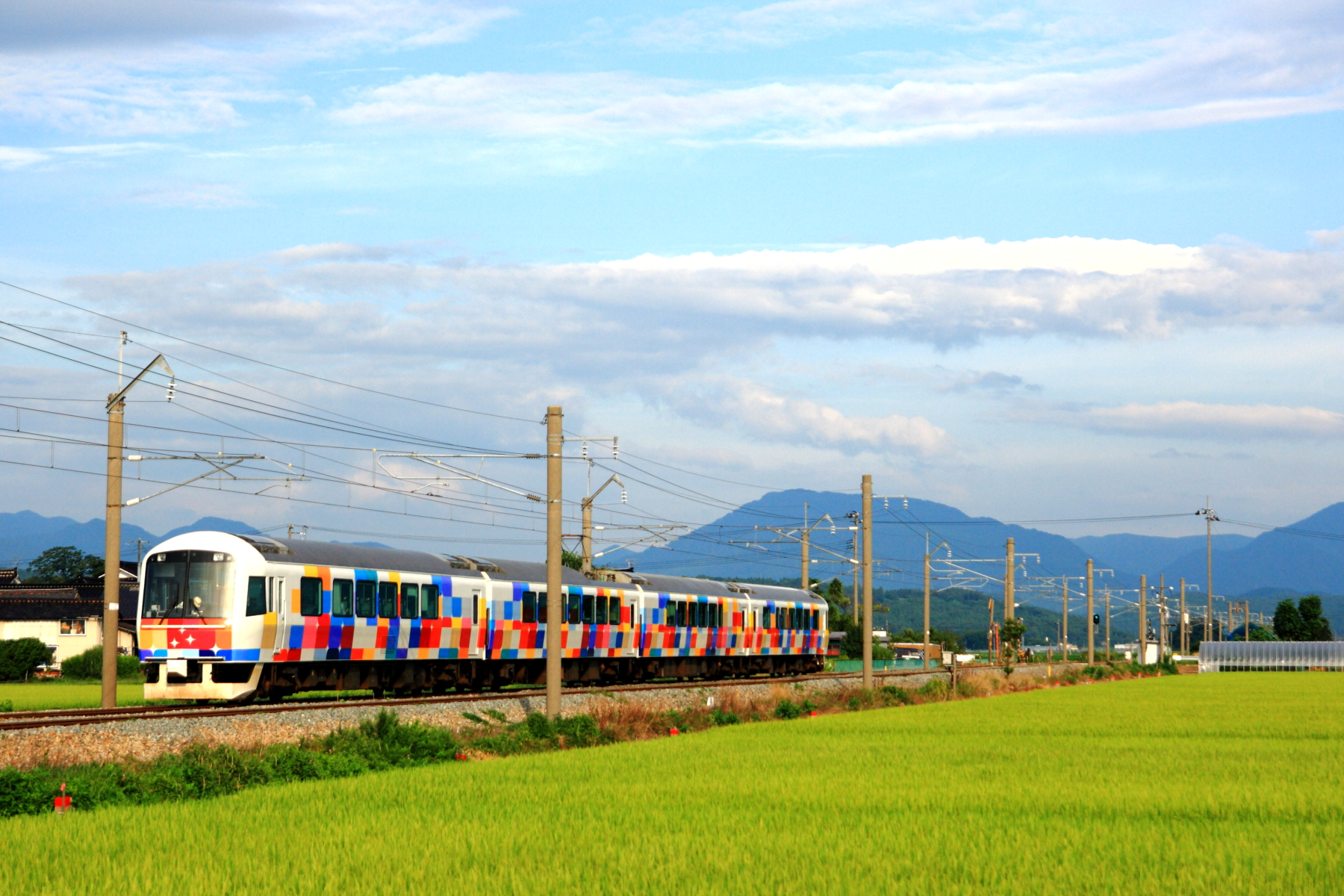
- Kirakira Uetsu (Joyful Train)

Overview
- Native name: 羽越本線
- Status: Operating
- Owner: JR East
- Locale: Niigata, Yamagata, Akita Prefectures
- Termini: Niitsu Station; Akita Station
- Stations: 61

Service
- Type: Heavy rail
- System: JR East
- Operator(s): JR East, JR Freight

History
- Opened: 2 September 1912; 113 years ago

Technical
- Track length: 274.4 km (170.5 mi)
- Number of tracks: Sections of double track and single track
- Track gauge: 1,067 mm (3 ft 6 in); 1,435 mm (4 ft 8 1/2 in)
- Electrification: 1,500 V DC, 20 kV AC 50 Hz
- Operating speed: 120 km/h (75 mph)
Route map

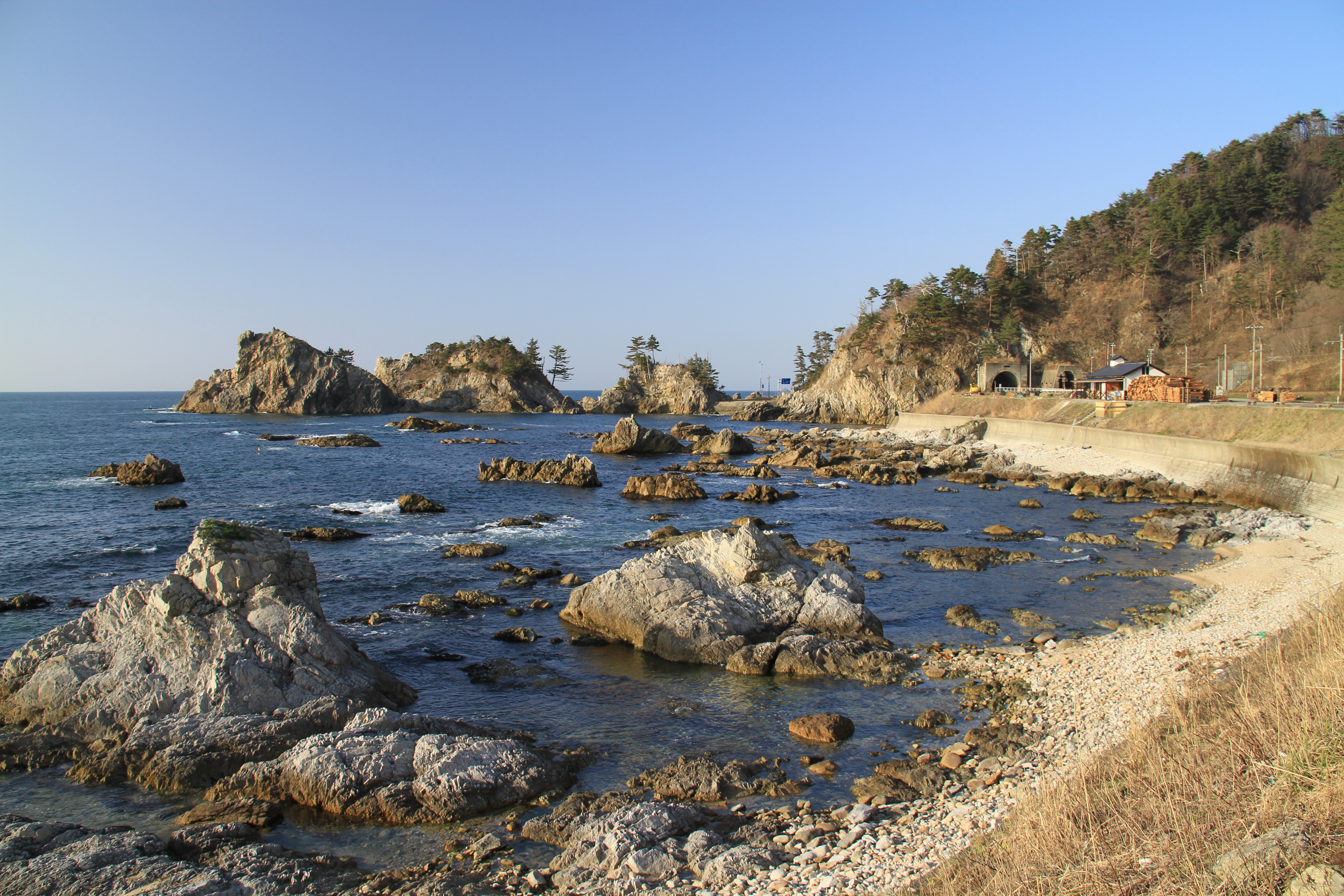
The Uetsu Main Line runs along the Sea of Japan. One of the tunnels on the right is for the Uetsu Main Line, and the other Japan National Route 345.

The Uetsu Main Line (羽越本線, Uetsu-hon-sen) is a railway line in the Tohoku and Chubu regions of Japan. Part of the East Japan Railway Company (JR East) system, it connects Niitsu Station in the city of Niigata and Akita Station in Akita. The name "Uetsu" refers to the ancient provinces of Dewa (出羽) and Echigo (越後), which the line connects.

== Route data ==
- Total length: 274.4 km (170.5 mi) (Fukushima–Aomori, Tsuchizaki–Akitakō)
- Operators, distances:
  - East Japan Railway Company (Services and tracks)
    - Niitsu — Akita: 271.7 km (168.8 mi)
  - Japan Freight Railway Company (Services and tracks)
    - Sakata — Sakata-Minato: 2.7 km (1.7 mi)
  - Japan Freight Railway Company (Services)
    - Niitsu — Akita: 271.7 km (168.8 mi)
- Tracks:
  - See station list for details
- Electrification:
  - Niitsu — Murakami: 1,500 V DC
  - Murakami — Akita: 20 kV AC, 50 Hz
- Railway signalling:
- Maximum speed:
  - Niitsu — Murakami: 120 km/h (75 mph)
  - Murakami — Imagawa: 100 km/h (62 mph)
  - Imagawa — Sanze: 95 km/h (59 mph)
  - Sanze — Sakata: 120 km/h (75 mph)
  - Sakata — Akita: 95 km/h (59 mph)

== Services ==
Limited express, Rapid

As of March 2020, the following services are operated.

Name	Route	Service frequency (daily)
Limited Express Inaho	(Niigata) – Shibata – Sakata/Akita	7 return trips
Rapid Kairi	(Niigata) – Shibata – Sakata	1 return trip (weekends only)
Rapid Rakuraku Train Murakami	(Niigata) – Shibata – Murakami	1 down trip
Rapid Benibana	(Niigata) – Shibata – Sakamachi – (Yonezawa)	1 return trip

Local
Niitsu – Shibata: every 60-180 minutes
Shibata – Murakami: every 60-120 minutes
Murakami – Sakata: every 60-180 minutes
Sakata – Akita: every 60-180 minutes

Between Shibata and Murakami, most of the local trains travel through to/from Niigata via Hakushin Line.

== Stations ==
A: Limited Express Inaho
B: Rapid Kairi
C: Rapid Rakuraku Train Murakami, Benibana and other Rapid service trains
Trains stop at stations marked "O", skip at stations marked "|".

Station	Japanese	Distance (km)		A	B	C	Transfers		DC/AC	Location	
Station	Japanese	Between stations	Total	A	B	C	Transfers		DC/AC	Location	
Niitsu	新津	-	0.0	Via; Hakushin Line			■ Shin'etsu Main Line; ■ Ban'etsu West Line	∨	1,500 V DC	Akiha-ku, Niigata	Niigata
Kyōgase	京ヶ瀬	6.1	6.1	Via; Hakushin Line				◇	1,500 V DC	Agano	Niigata
Suibara	水原	4.1	10.2	Via; Hakushin Line				◇	1,500 V DC	Agano	Niigata
Kamiyama	神山	3.7	13.9	Via; Hakushin Line				｜	1,500 V DC	Agano	Niigata
Tsukioka	月岡	3.9	17.8	Via; Hakushin Line				◇	1,500 V DC	Shibata	Niigata
Nakaura	中浦	3.7	21.5	Via; Hakushin Line				｜	1,500 V DC	Shibata	Niigata
Shibata	新発田	4.5	26.0	O	O	O	■ Hakushin Line (some trains through to Murakami)	^	1,500 V DC	Shibata	Niigata
Kaji	加治	4.3	30.3	|	|	| (Note: Only 1 up rapid service in the morning stops)		∥	1,500 V DC	Shibata	Niigata
Kanazuka	金塚	5.0	35.3	|	|	|		∨	1,500 V DC	Shibata	Niigata
Nakajō	中条	3.8	39.1	O	O	O		^	1,500 V DC	Tainai	Niigata
Hirakida	平木田	5.6	44.7	|	|	|		∥	1,500 V DC	Tainai	Niigata
Sakamachi	坂町	3.3	48.0	O	O	O	■ Yonesaka Line (Operation suspended due to rainstorm damage)	∥	1,500 V DC	Murakami	Niigata
Hirabayashi	平林	3.6	51.6	|	|	|		∨	1,500 V DC	Murakami	Niigata
Iwafunemachi	岩船町	3.6	55.2	|	|	|		◇	1,500 V DC	Murakami	Niigata
Murakami	村上	4.2	59.4	O	O	O		^	1,500 V DC	Murakami	Niigata
Majima	間島	7.1	66.5	|	|			∨	20 kV; AC; 50 Hz	Murakami	Niigata
Echigo-Hayakawa	越後早川	4.9	71.4	|	|			^	20 kV; AC; 50 Hz	Murakami	Niigata
Kuwagawa	桑川	6.9	78.3	|	O			∨	20 kV; AC; 50 Hz	Murakami	Niigata
Imagawa	今川	4.3	82.6	|	|			◇	20 kV; AC; 50 Hz	Murakami	Niigata
Echigo-Kangawa	越後寒川	4.9	87.5	|	|			^	20 kV; AC; 50 Hz	Murakami	Niigata
Gatsugi	勝木	5.3	92.8	|	|			∨	20 kV; AC; 50 Hz	Murakami	Niigata
Fuya	府屋	3.1	95.9	O	|			^	20 kV; AC; 50 Hz	Murakami	Niigata
Nezugaseki	鼠ヶ関	5.1	101.0	|	|			∥	20 kV; AC; 50 Hz	Tsuruoka	Yamagata
Koiwagawa	小岩川	4.4	105.4	|	|			∨	20 kV; AC; 50 Hz	Tsuruoka	Yamagata
Atsumi Onsen	あつみ温泉	4.4	109.8	O	O			^	20 kV; AC; 50 Hz	Tsuruoka	Yamagata
Iragawa	五十川	5.9	115.7	|	|			∥	20 kV; AC; 50 Hz	Tsuruoka	Yamagata
Kobato	小波渡	4.4	120.1	|	|			∥	20 kV; AC; 50 Hz	Tsuruoka	Yamagata
Sanze	三瀬	3.1	123.2	|	|			∥	20 kV; AC; 50 Hz	Tsuruoka	Yamagata
Uzen-Mizusawa	羽前水沢	5.7	128.9	|	|			∥	20 kV; AC; 50 Hz	Tsuruoka	Yamagata
Uzen-Ōyama	羽前大山	4.5	133.4	|	|			∨	20 kV; AC; 50 Hz	Tsuruoka	Yamagata
Tsuruoka	鶴岡	6.0	139.4	O	O			◇	20 kV; AC; 50 Hz	Tsuruoka	Yamagata
Fujishima	藤島	6.6	146.0	|	|			^	20 kV; AC; 50 Hz	Tsuruoka	Yamagata
Nishibukuro	西袋	5.1	151.1	|	|			∥	20 kV; AC; 50 Hz	Shōnai, Higashitagawa	Yamagata
Amarume	余目	3.6	154.7	O	O		■ Rikuu West Line (Note: Most trains from Rikuu West Line terminate at Sakata Station) (Operation suspended until 2024/2025)	∥	20 kV; AC; 50 Hz	Shōnai, Higashitagawa	Yamagata
Kita-Amarume	北余目	2.7	157.4	|	|			∥	20 kV; AC; 50 Hz	Shōnai, Higashitagawa	Yamagata
Sagoshi	砂越	3.0	160.4	|	|			∥	20 kV; AC; 50 Hz	Sakata	Yamagata
Higashi-Sakata	東酒田	3.3	163.7	|	|			∥	20 kV; AC; 50 Hz	Sakata	Yamagata
Sakata	酒田	3.2	166.9	O	O		JR Freight Uetsu Freight Branch Line (to Sakata-Minato)	∥	20 kV; AC; 50 Hz	Sakata	Yamagata
Mototate	本楯	6.4	173.3	|				∨	20 kV; AC; 50 Hz	Sakata	Yamagata
Minamichōkai	南鳥海	2.6	175.9	|				◇	20 kV; AC; 50 Hz	Sakata	Yamagata
Yuza	遊佐	3.2	179.1	O				^	20 kV; AC; 50 Hz	Yuza, Akumi	Yamagata
Fukura	吹浦	7.0	186.1	|				∨	20 kV; AC; 50 Hz	Yuza, Akumi	Yamagata
Mega	女鹿	3.6	189.7	|				◇	20 kV; AC; 50 Hz	Yuza, Akumi	Yamagata
Kosagawa	小砂川	5.1	194.8	|				◇	20 kV; AC; 50 Hz	Nikaho	Akita
Kamihama	上浜	3.7	198.5	|				◇	20 kV; AC; 50 Hz	Nikaho	Akita
Kisakata	象潟	4.9	203.4	O				◇	20 kV; AC; 50 Hz	Nikaho	Akita
Konoura	金浦	5.8	209.2	|				^	20 kV; AC; 50 Hz	Nikaho	Akita
Nikaho	仁賀保	5.5	214.7	O				∨	20 kV; AC; 50 Hz	Nikaho	Akita
Nishime	西目	8.4	223.1	|				^	20 kV; AC; 50 Hz	Yurihonjō	Akita
Ugo-Honjō	羽後本荘	5.8	228.9	O		O	■ Yuri Kōgen Railway Chōkai Sanroku Line	∥	20 kV; AC; 50 Hz	Yurihonjō	Akita
Ugo-Iwaya	羽後岩谷	7.1	236.0	|		O		∥	20 kV; AC; 50 Hz	Yurihonjō	Akita
Oriwatari	折渡	4.7	240.7	|		↓		∨	20 kV; AC; 50 Hz	Yurihonjō	Akita
Ugo-Kameda	羽後亀田	3.0	243.7	|		O		◇	20 kV; AC; 50 Hz	Yurihonjō	Akita
Iwaki-Minato	岩城みなと	6.5	250.2	|		↓		｜	20 kV; AC; 50 Hz	Yurihonjō	Akita
Michikawa	道川	1.6	251.8	|		↓		^	20 kV; AC; 50 Hz	Yurihonjō	Akita
Shimohama	下浜	6.6	258.4	|		↓		∨	20 kV; AC; 50 Hz	Akita	Akita
Katsurane	桂根	3.4	261.7	|		↓		◇	20 kV; AC; 50 Hz	Akita	Akita
Araya	新屋	4.0	265.7	|		O		◇	20 kV; AC; 50 Hz	Akita	Akita
Ugo-Ushijima	羽後牛島	3.3	269.0	|		O		◇	20 kV; AC; 50 Hz	Akita	Akita
Akita	秋田	2.7	271.7	O		O	Akita Shinkansen; ■ Ōu Main Line; ■ Oga Line (Note: The official beginning of the Oga Line is at Oiwake Station, but all trains terminate at Akita Station.)	^	20 kV; AC; 50 Hz	Akita	Akita

Symbols:

- | - Single-track
- ◇ - Single-track; station where trains can pass
- ^ - Double-track section starts from this point
- ∥ - Double-track
- ∨ - Single-track section starts from this point

== Rolling stock ==
=== Present ===
==== Local ====
- E129 series 2/4-car DC EMUs (Niitsu—Murakami, since December 2014)
- 701 series 2/3-car AC EMUs (Sakata—Akita)
- KiHa 110 series (Niitsu - Nezugaseki)
- GV-E400 series (Niitsu-Sakata, since August 2019)

==== Inaho/Rakuraku Train Murakami ====
- E653-1000 series 7-car DC/AC EMUs (since September 2013)

==== Kairi ====
- HB-E300 series
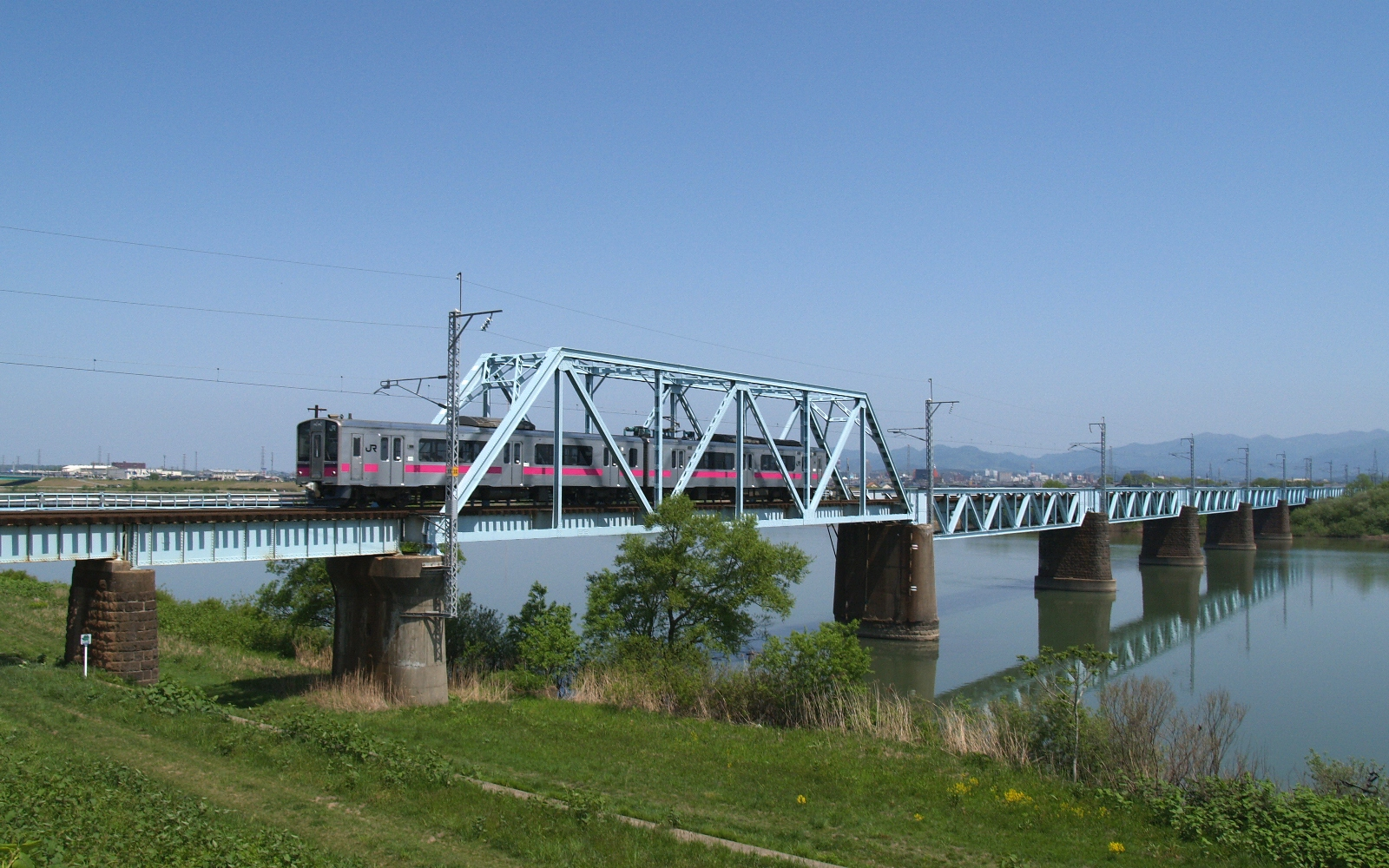
701 series passing Omonogawa Bridge

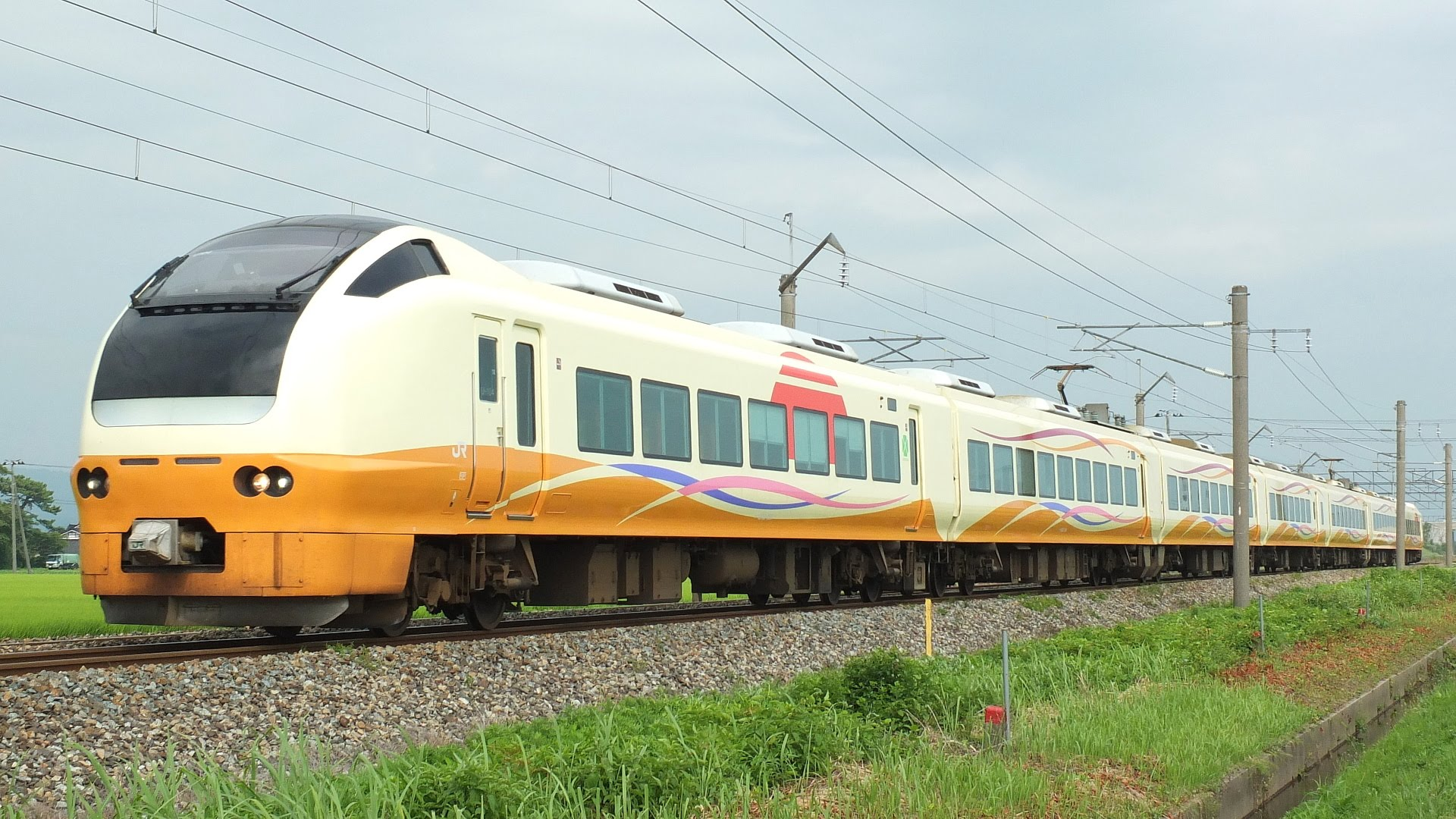
E653 series Inaho, near Higashi-Sakata Station

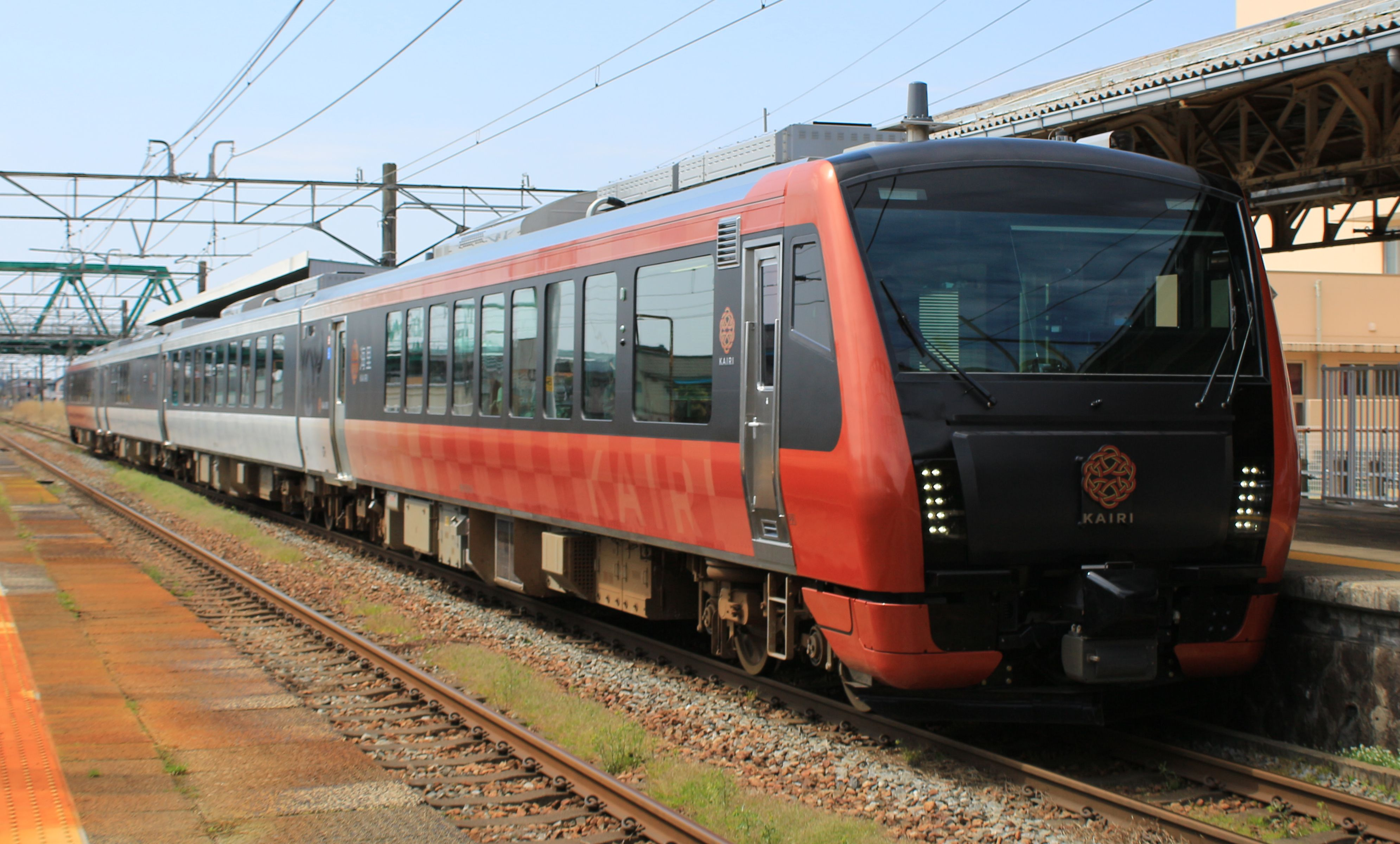
Kairi at Shibata Station, April 2020

=== Former ===
- 115 series DC EMUs (Niitsu—Murakami, until March 2018)
- E127-0 series 2-car DC EMUs (Shibata—Murakami, until March 2015)
- KiHa 40/47/48 series DMUs (Until March 2020)
- KiHa E120 DMUs (Niitsu—Sakata, until March 2018)
- KiHa 58 series DMUs
- KiHa 52 DMUs
- 485 series DC/AC EMUs (until July 2014) - Inaho, Hakucho, Rakuraku Train Murakami
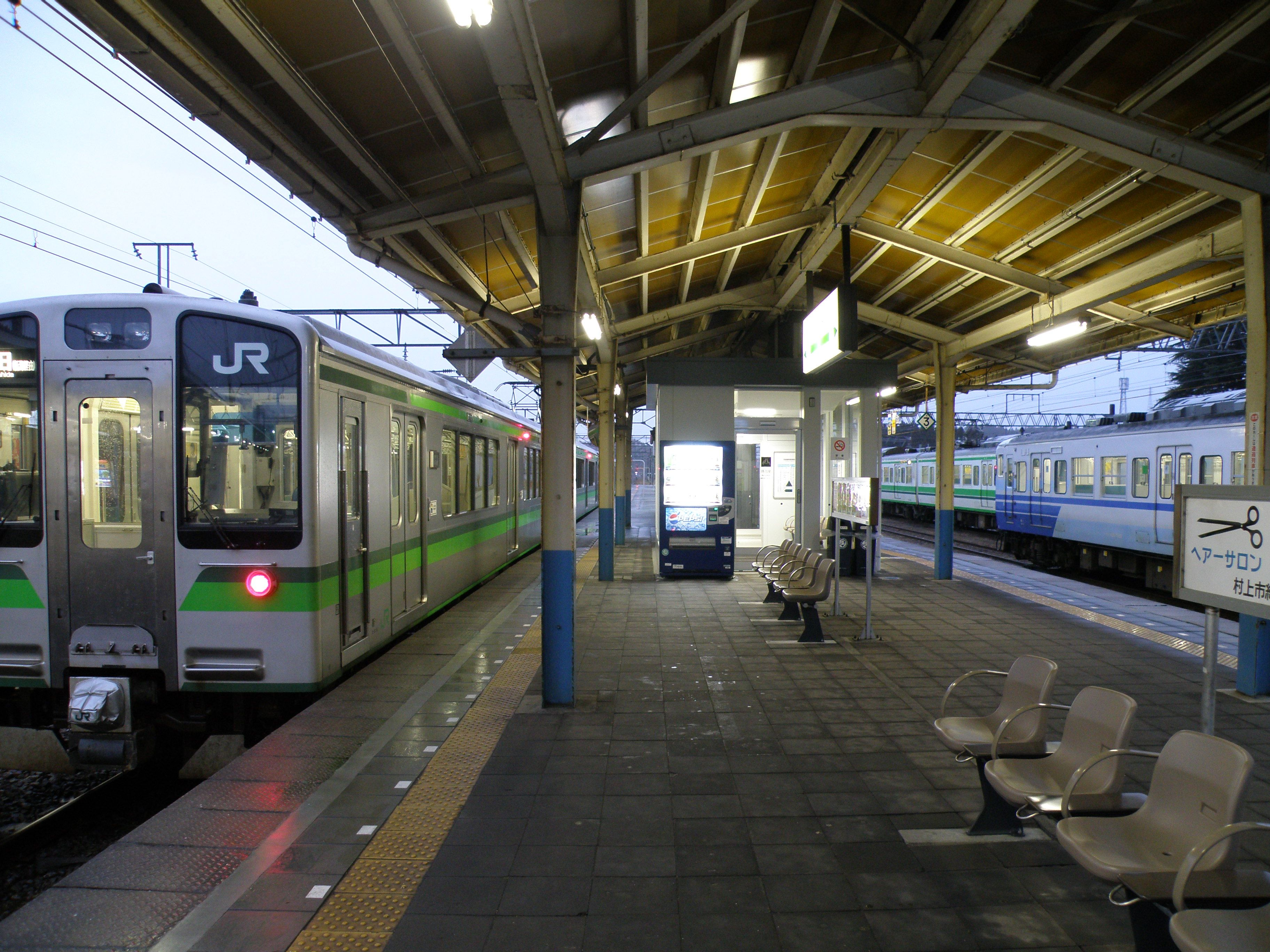
E127 series and 115 series at Murakami Station, March 2009

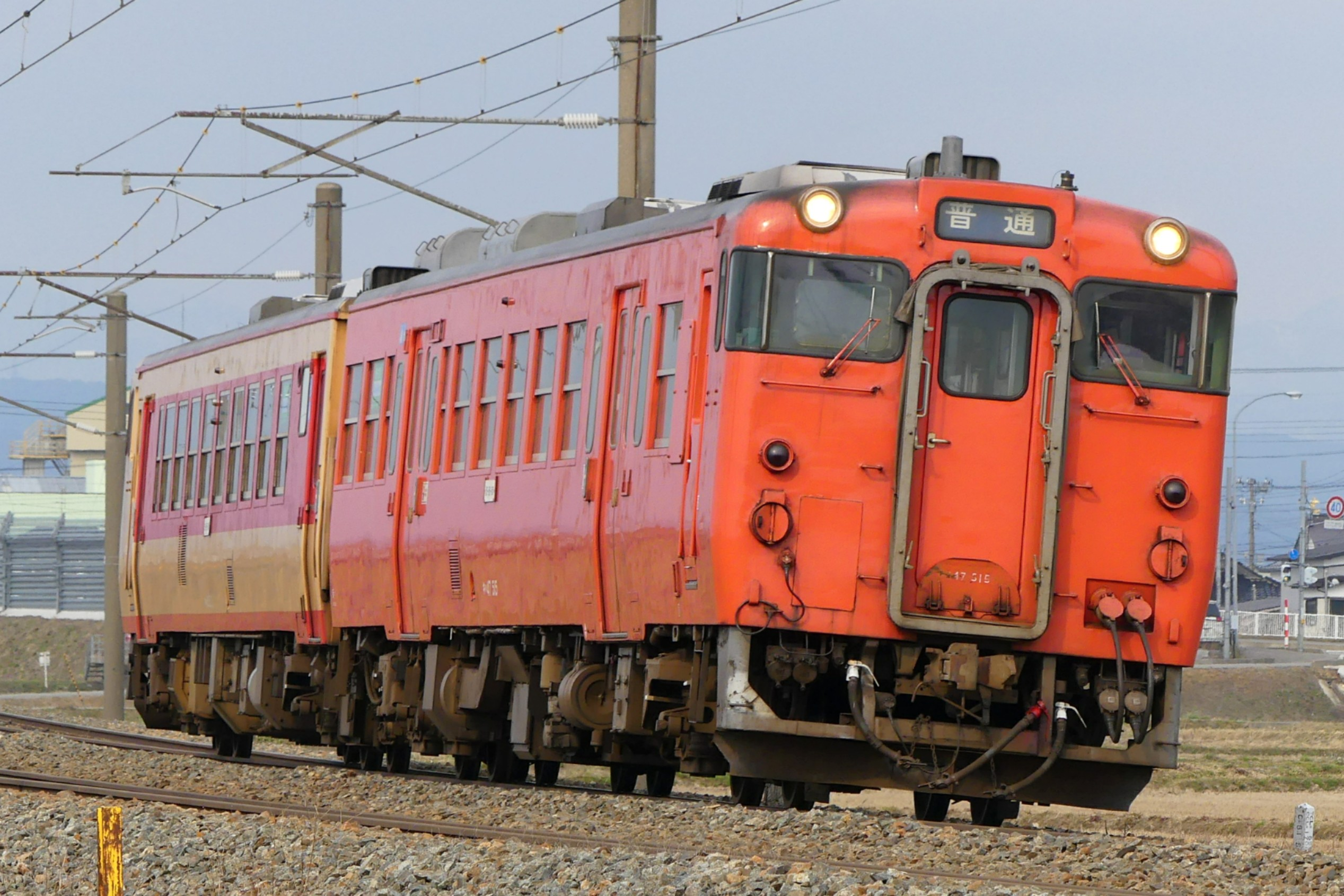
KiHa 40/47/48 series, Amarume - Nishibukuro, March 2017

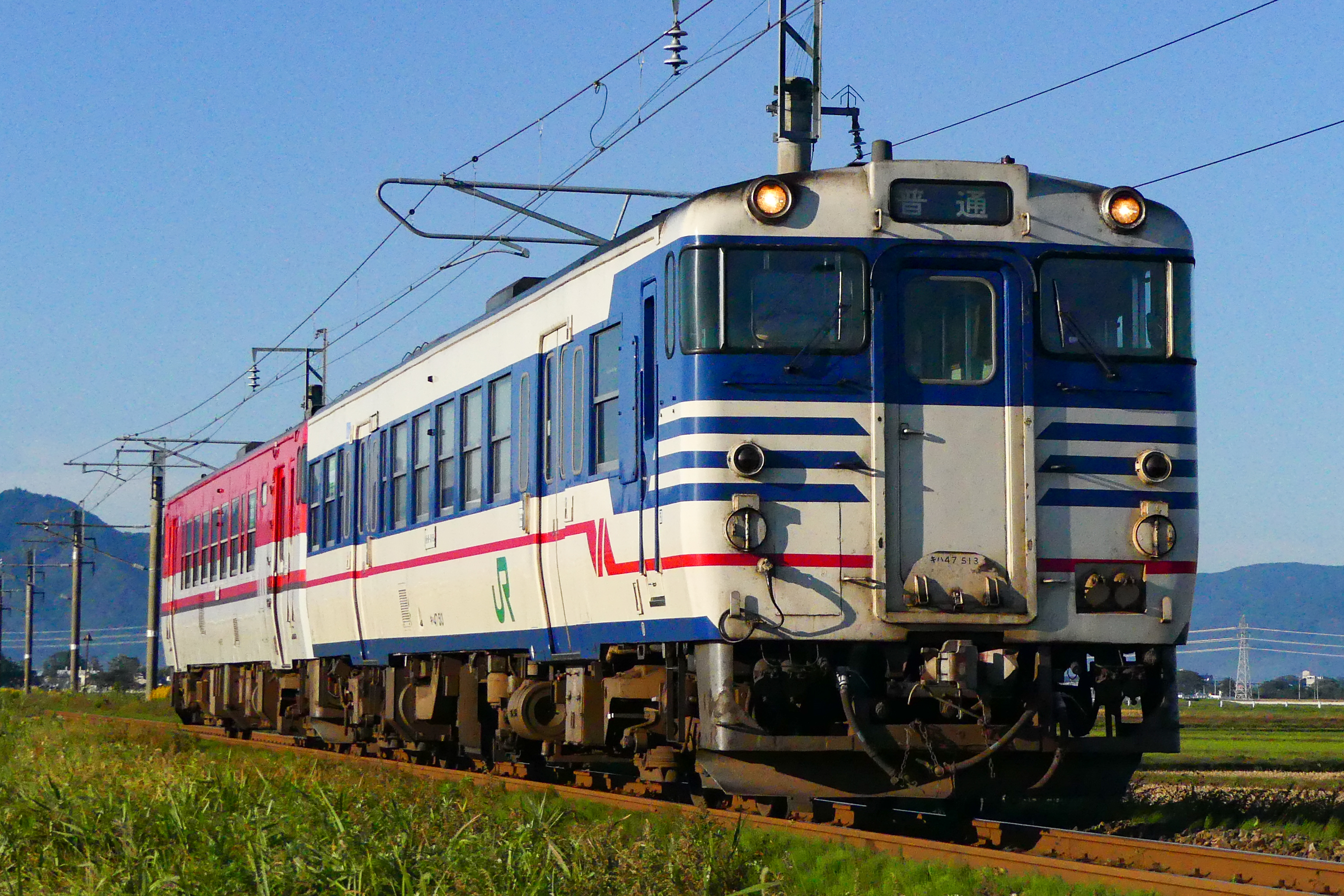
KiHa 40/47/48 series, Tsuruoka - Fujishima, October 2016

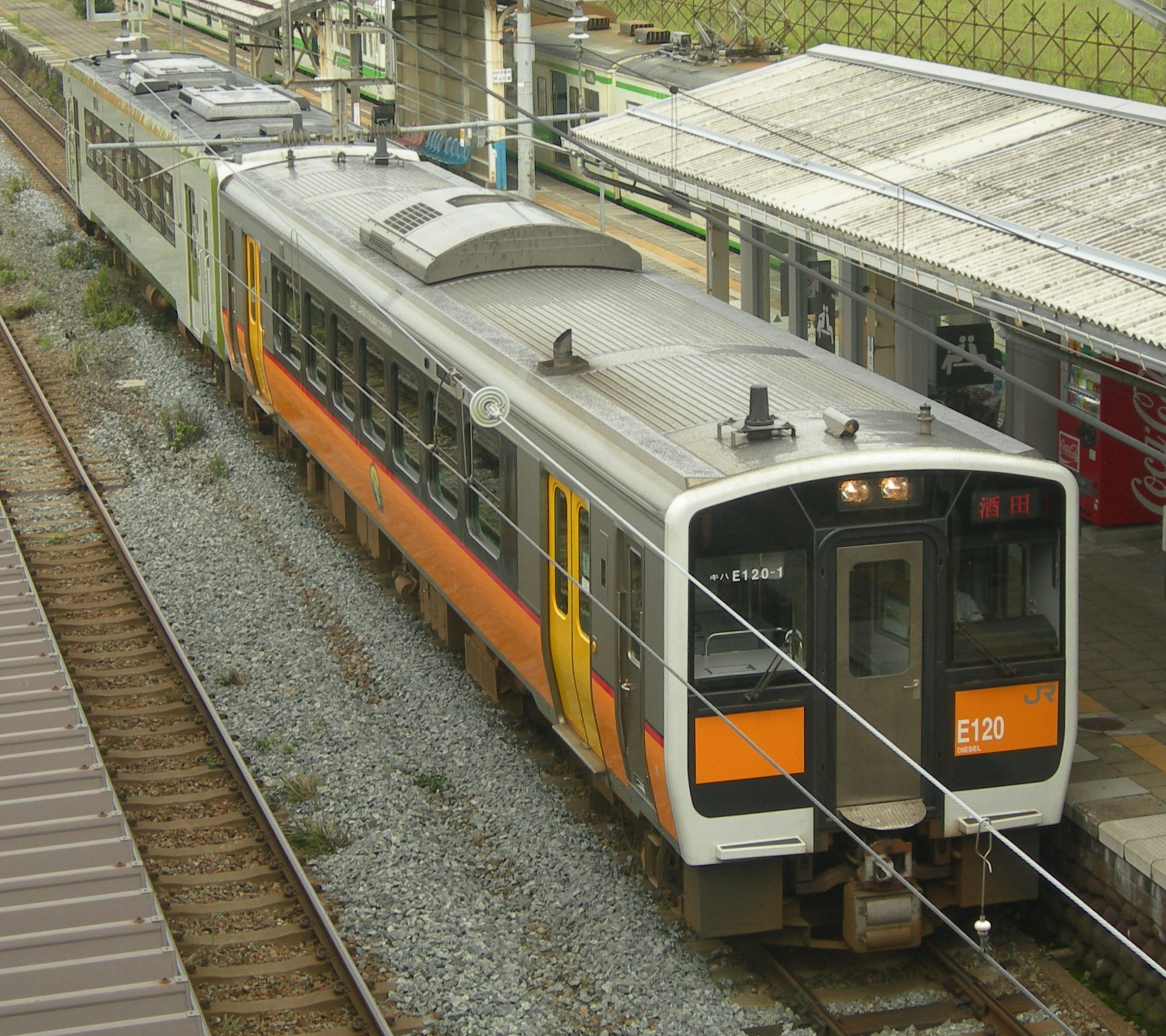
KiHa E120 and 110 at Sakamachi Station, July 2009

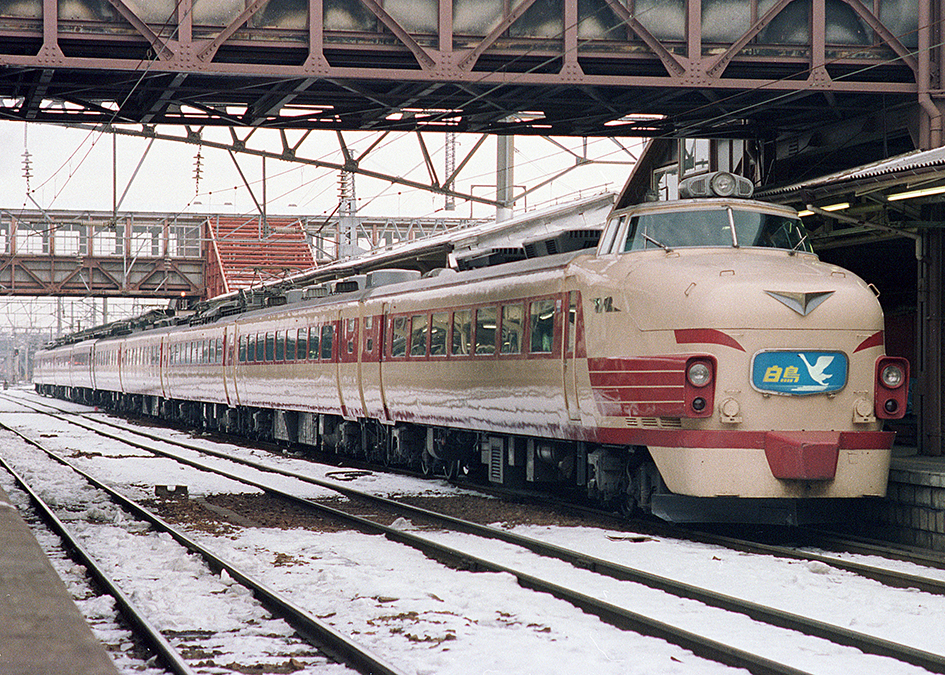
485 series Hakucho limited espress, Akita Station, 1987

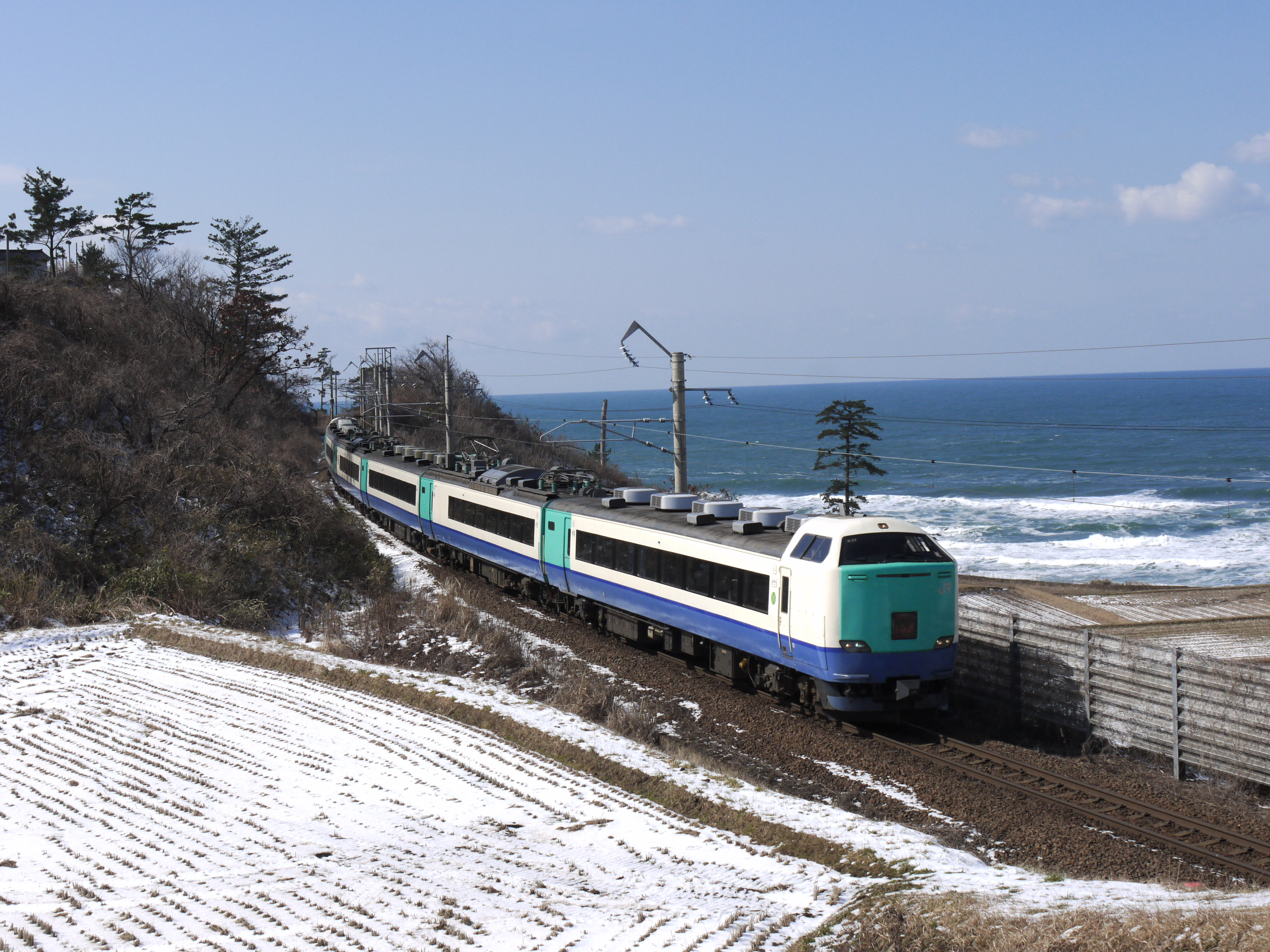
485-3000 series Inaho limited express, Kosagawa - Kamihama, March 2014

== History ==
The line was opened in sections between 1912 and 1924, and electrified in 1972, the same year CTC signalling was commissioned.

Work to double-track the line in sections commenced in 1957, and continued for 25 years until being suspended due to capital expenditure restrictions in 1983, at which time 51% of the route was double-tracked.

On July 28, 2022, JR East announced that ridership in some sectors was less than 2000 persons/day, the deficit for the sector between Murakami Station to Tsuruoka Station being 4,990 billion yen, the largest deficit within the JR East system.

== Accidents ==
On December 25, 2005, all six cars of a limited express train Inaho No.14 on the Uetsu Line derailed in Yamagata prefecture, about 350 kilometres (220 mi) north of Tokyo. The train was headed south towards Kita-Amarume Station. Three of the cars turned over, causing the deaths of five people and injuring 33 others. Three other persons were originally reported missing, but authorities later discovered that they had disembarked from the train before the accident. It is likely that the event was caused by a tornado although it is uncertain whether or not a tornado was involved with this accident.
