= Amarume Station =

Railway station in Shōnai, Yamagata Prefecture, Japan

Amarume Station 余目駅
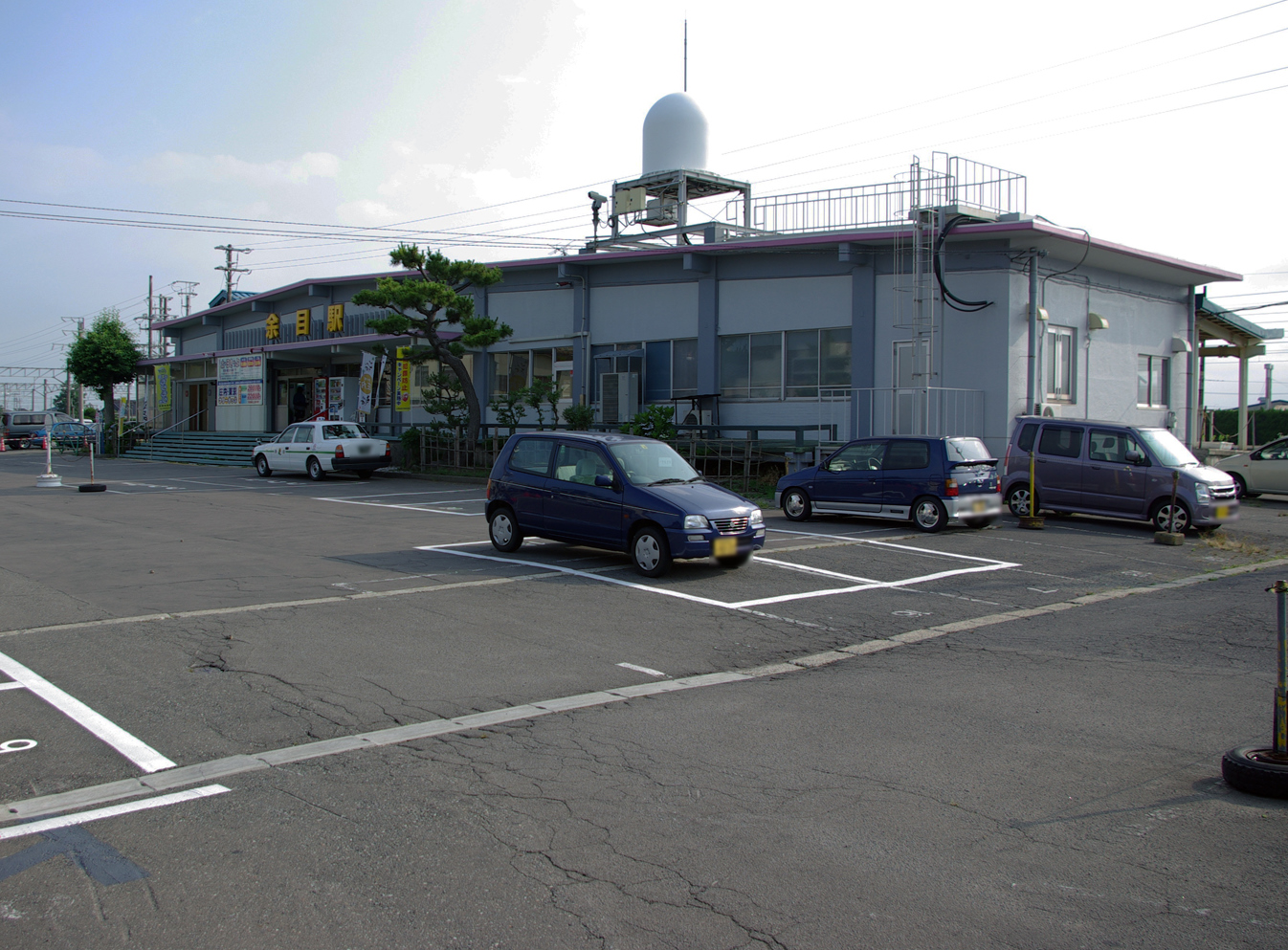
- Station building, July 2009

General information
- Location: Sawada Amarume, Shōnai-machi, Higashitagawa-gun, Yamagata-ken 999-7781; Japan
- Coordinates: 38°50′40″N 139°54′41″E
- Operator: JR East
- Lines: ■ Uetsu Main Line; ■ Rikuu West Line
- Distance: 154.7 kilometers from Niitsu
- Platforms: 1 side + 2 island platforms

Other information
- Status: Staffed (Midori no Madoguchi)
- Website: Official website

History
- Opened: 20 September 1914

Passengers
- FY2018: 503 daily

Services
Preceding station	JR East	Following station
Tsuruoka towards Niigata	Inaho	Sakata towards Akita
Nishibukuro towards Niitsu	Uetsu Main Line	Kita-Amarume towards Akita
Karikawa towards Shinjō	Rikuu West Line Rapid Mogamigawa	Sakata Terminus
Minamino One-way operation	Rikuu West Line Rapid Mogamigawa	Sakata Terminus
Minamino towards Shinjō	Rikuu West Line Local	Kita-Amarume towards Sakata
Location
- Location within Yamagata Prefecture Location within Japan

Amarume Station (余目駅, Amarume-eki) is a junction railway station in the town of Shōnai, Yamagata, Japan, operated by the East Japan Railway Company (JR East).

== Lines ==
Amarume Station is served by the Rikuu West Line and the Uetsu Main Line. The station is located 154.7 rail kilometers from the starting point of the Uetsu Main Line at Niitsu Station, and is the official terminus of the 42.0 kilometer Rikuu West Line, although most trains continue on to Sakata Station.

== Station layout ==
Amarume Station has one side platform next to the station building and two island platforms connected by a footbridge. However, as Platform 1 is short, it is not in normal operation. The station has a Midori no Madoguchi staffed ticket office.

=== Platforms ===
1	■ Uetsu Main Line	out of service
2	■ Uetsu Main Line	for Sakata, Ugo-Honjō, and Akita
3	■ Uetsu Main Line	for Tsuruoka, Murakami, and Niigata
4	■ Rikuu West Line	for Sakata
5	■ Rikuu West Line	for Shinjō and Furukuchi

== History ==
Amarume Station opened on 20 September 1914. A new station building was opened in 1965. With the privatization of JNR on 1 April 1987, the station came under the control of JR East.

== Passenger statistics ==
In fiscal 2018, the station was used by an average of 503 passengers daily (boarding passengers only). The passenger figures for previous years are as shown below.

Fiscal year	Daily average
2000	774
2005	647
2010	527
2015	497

== Surrounding area ==
- Shōnai Town Hall
- Amarume Post Office

== See also ==
- List of railway stations in Japan
