= Sakata Station (Yamagata) =

Railway station in Sakata, Yamagata Prefecture, Japan

Sakata Station 酒田駅
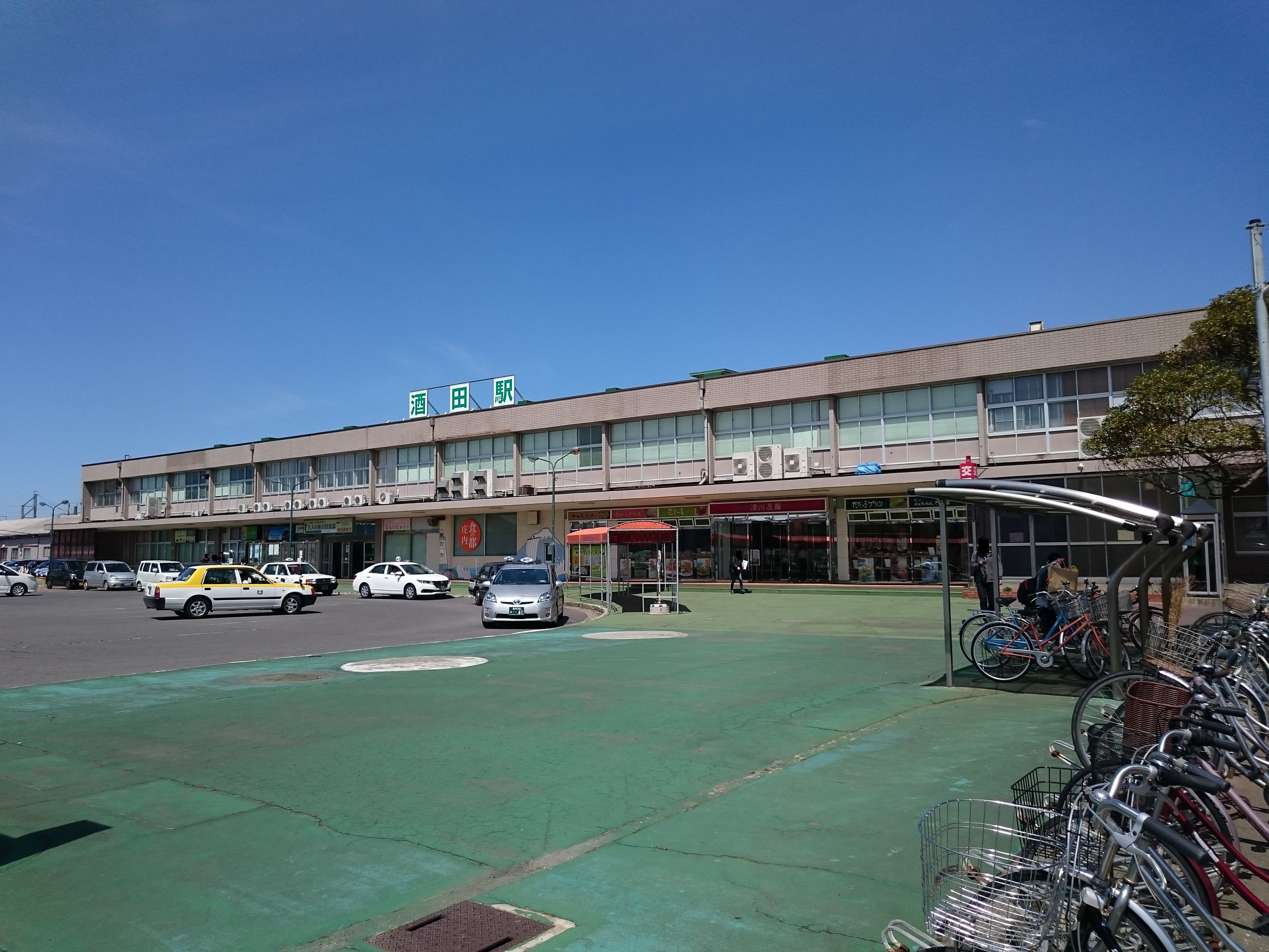
- Sakata Station, June 2019

General information
- Location: 1-1-1 Saiwaichō, Sakata-shi, Yamagata-ken 998-0023; Japan
- Coordinates: 38°55′18.5″N 139°50′45.6″E
- Operator: JR East
- Lines: ■ Uetsu Main Line; ■ Rikuu West Line
- Distance: 166.9 kilometers from Niitsu
- Platforms: 1 side + 1 island platform

Other information
- Status: Staffed (Talking reserved seat ticket vending machine installation)
- Website: Official website

History
- Opened: 24 December 1914

Services
| Preceding station | JR East | Following station |
|---|---|---|
| Amarume towards Niigata | Inaho | Yuza towards Akita |
| Higashi-Sakata towards Niitsu | Uetsu Main Line | Mototate towards Akita |
| Amarume towards Shinjō | Rikuu West Line Rapid Mogamigawa | Terminus |
| Higashi-Sakata towards Shinjō | Rikuu West Line Local | Terminus |
Location
- Location within Yamagata Prefecture Location within Japan

Sakata Station (酒田駅, Sakata-eki) is a railway station in the city of Sakata, Yamagata, Japan, operated by the East Japan Railway Company (JR East).

== Lines ==
Sakata Station is served by the Uetsu Main Line. It is located 166.9 kilometers from the starting point of the Uetsu Main Line at Niitsu Station. The Rikuu West Line officially terminates at Amarume Station, but most trains continue on to terminate a Sakata Station, which is 55.2 kilometers from the eastern terminus of that line at Shinjō Station.

The following limited express services also stop at this station.

- Inaho (Niigata - Akita) (some trains terminate at Sakata)

Discontinued

- Akebono (Ueno - Aomori) (overnight sleeping car service)
- Nihonkai (Osaka - Aomori) (overnight sleeping car service)

== Station layout ==
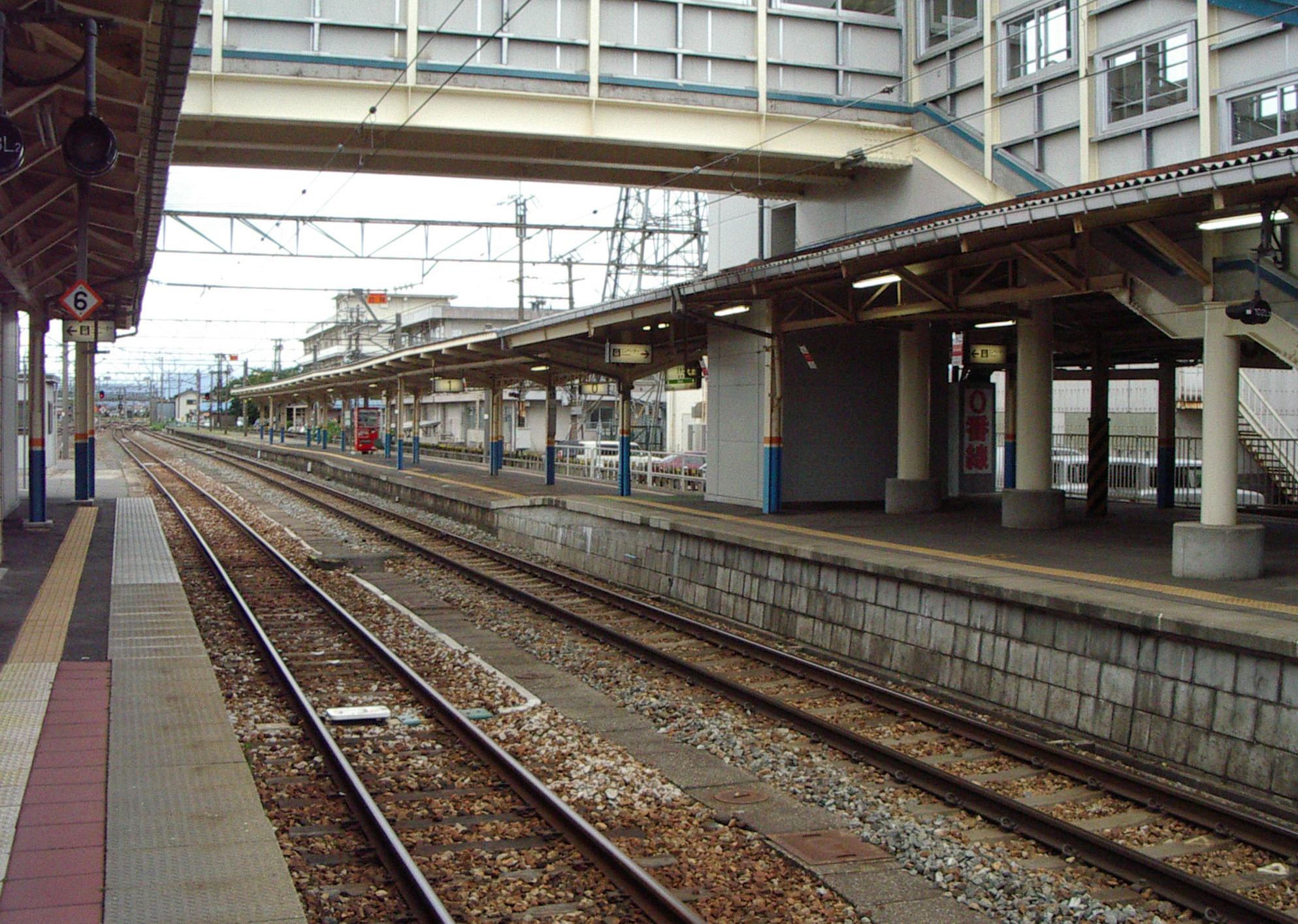
View of the platforms, July 2007

Sakata Station has one side platform and one island platform connected by a footbridge. One portion of the side platform is cut to form a partial bay platform, allowing the two platforms to serve four tracks. The station has a Talking reserved seat ticket vending machine (話せる指定席券売機).

=== Platforms ===
| 0 | ■ Uetsu Main Line | for Amarume, Tsuruoka, Atsumi Onsen, and Murakami (services originating at this station) |
| 0 | ■ Rikuu West Line | for Amarume, Furukuchi, and Shinjō |
| 1 | ■ Uetsu Main Line | for Kisakata, Ugo-Honjō, Akita, and Aomori |
| 2 | ■ Uetsu Main Line | for Kisakata, Ugo-Honjō, and Akita |
| 2 | ■ Uetsu Main Line | for Amarume, Tsuruoka, Atsumi Onsen, and Murakami |
| 2 | ■ Rikuu West Line | for Amarume, Furukuchi, and Shinjō |
| 3 | ■ Uetsu Main Line | for Amarume, Tsuruoka, Atsumi Onsen, Murakami, Niigata, and Ueno |
| 3 | ■ Rikuu West Line | for Amarume, Furukuchi, and Shinjō |

== History ==
The station opened on 24 December 1914. The station building was rebuilt in 1934 and again in 1960.

== Passenger statistics ==
In fiscal 2018, the station was used by an average of 1159 passengers daily (boarding passengers only). The passenger figures for previous years are as shown below.

| Fiscal year | Daily average |
|---|---|
| 2000 | 2,213 |
| 2005 | 1,793 |
| 2010 | 1,369 |
| 2015 | 1,224 |

== Surrounding area ==
- Port of Sakata
- Homma Museum of Art
- National Route 112

== See also ==
- List of railway stations in Japan
