= Tsuruoka Station =

Railway station in Tsuruoka, Yamagata Prefecture, Japan

Tsuruoka Station 鶴岡駅
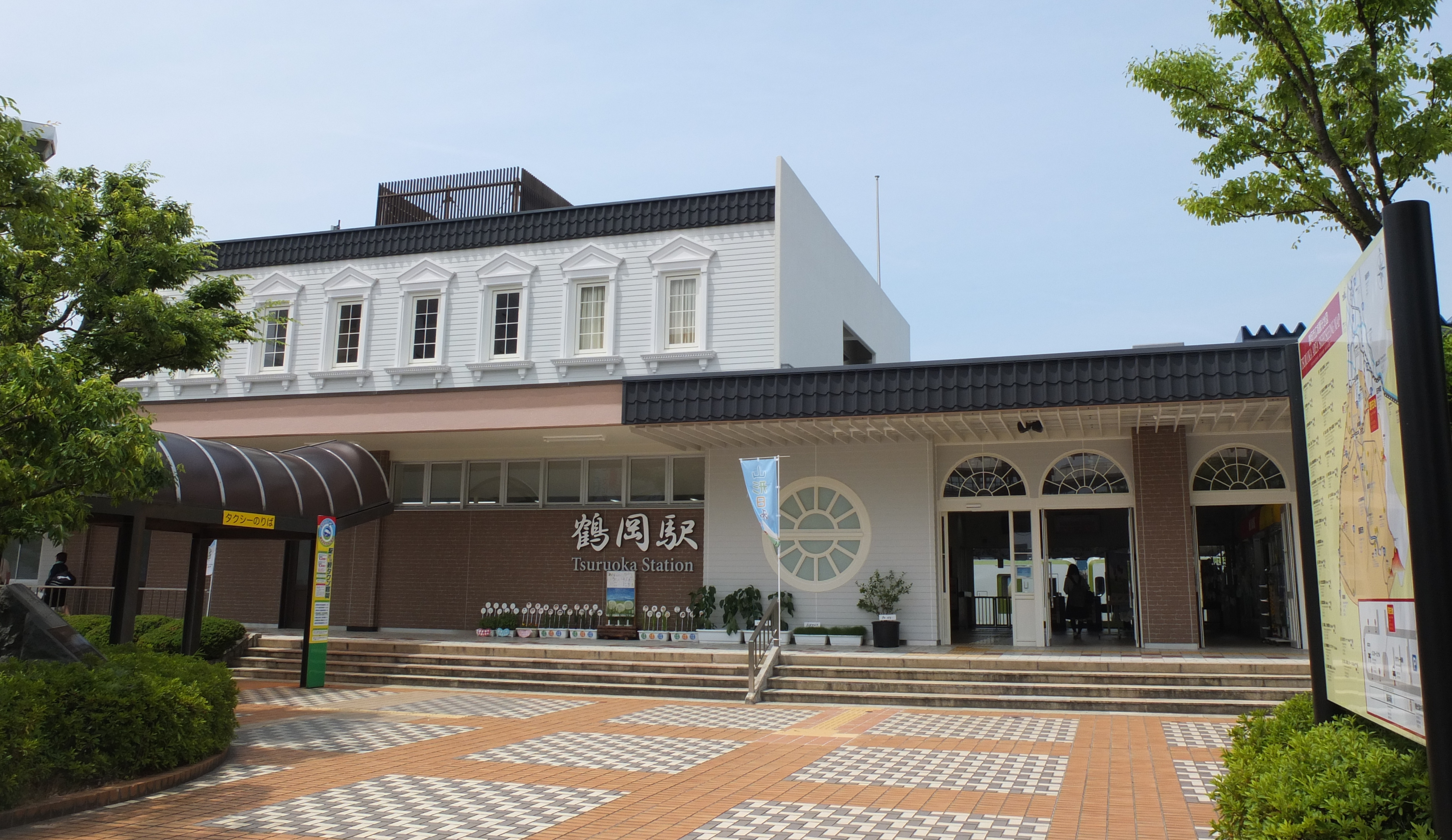
- Tsuruoka Station building, July 2014

General information
- Location: 1 Suehiro-machi, Tsuruoka-shi, Yamagata-ken 997-0015; Japan
- Coordinates: 38°44′23.2″N 139°50′8.7″E
- Operator: JR East
- Line: ■ Uetsu Main Line
- Distance: 139.4 kilometers from Niitsu
- Platforms: 1 side + 1 island platform

Other information
- Status: Staffed (Midori no Madoguchi)
- Website: Official website

History
- Opened: 21 September 1918; 108 years ago

Passengers
- FY2018: 1203

Services
Preceding station	JR East	Following station
Atsumi Onsen towards Niigata	Inaho	Amarume towards Akita
Uzen-Ōyama towards Niitsu	Uetsu Main Line	Fujishima towards Akita
Location
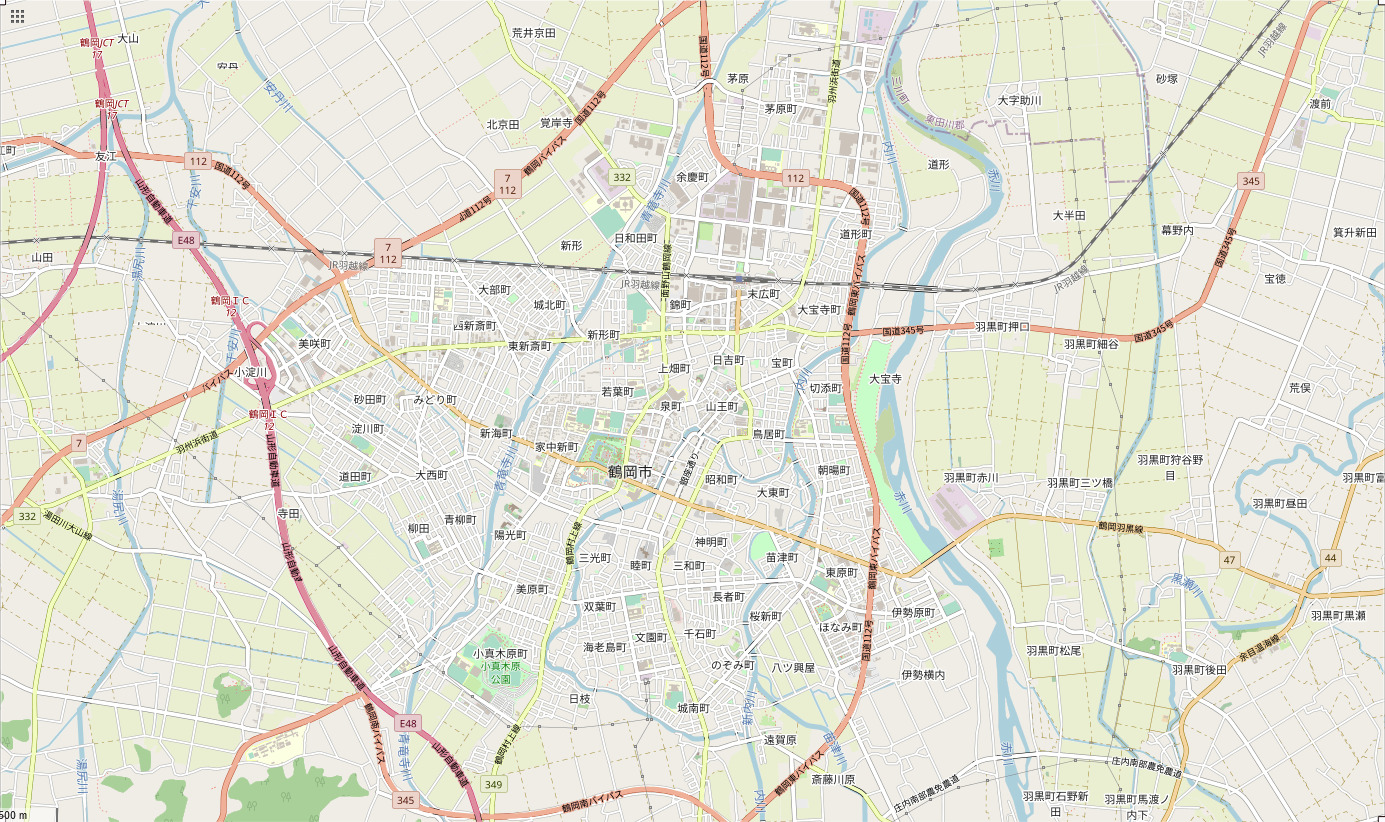
- Location within Tsuruoka, Yamagata Location within Yamagata Prefecture Location within Japan

Tsuruoka Station (鶴岡駅, Tsuruoka-eki) is a railway station located in the city of Tsuruoka, Yamagata, Japan, operated by the East Japan Railway Company (JR East).

== Lines ==
Tsuruoka Station is served by the Uetsu Main Line, and is located 139.4 kilometres (86.6 mi) kilometers from the starting point of the line at Niitsu Station.

== Station layout ==
The station has one side platform and one island platform connected to the station building by a footbridge. The station has a Midori no Madoguchi staffed ticket office, a NewDays convenience store, and coin lockers.

=== Platforms ===
1	■ Uetsu Main Line	for Atsumi Onsen and Murakami
2	■ Uetsu Main Line	passing loop
3	■ Uetsu Main Line	for Amarume, Sakata, and Akita

== History ==
Tsuruoka Station opened on 21 September 1918. With the privatization of Japanese National Railways (JNR) on 1 April 1987, the station came under the control of JR East.

== Passenger statistics ==
In the 2018 fiscal year, the station was used by an average of 1203 passengers daily (boarding passengers only),

== Surrounding area ==
- MARICA
- APA Hotel Yamagata Tsuruoka-Ekimae
- Hotel Route-Inn Tsuruoka-Ekimae
- Hotel Stay-in Sannō Plaza Annex
- Tokyo Daiichi Hotel Tsuruoka
- Tsuruoka Information Centre
- Tsuruoka-Ekimae Shopping District
- S-MALL
- Shufu no Mise
- Tsuruoka-Ekimae Post Office

== See also ==
- List of railway stations in Japan
