= Sanze Station =

Railway station in Tsuruoka, Yamagata Prefecture, Japan

Sanze Station 三瀬駅
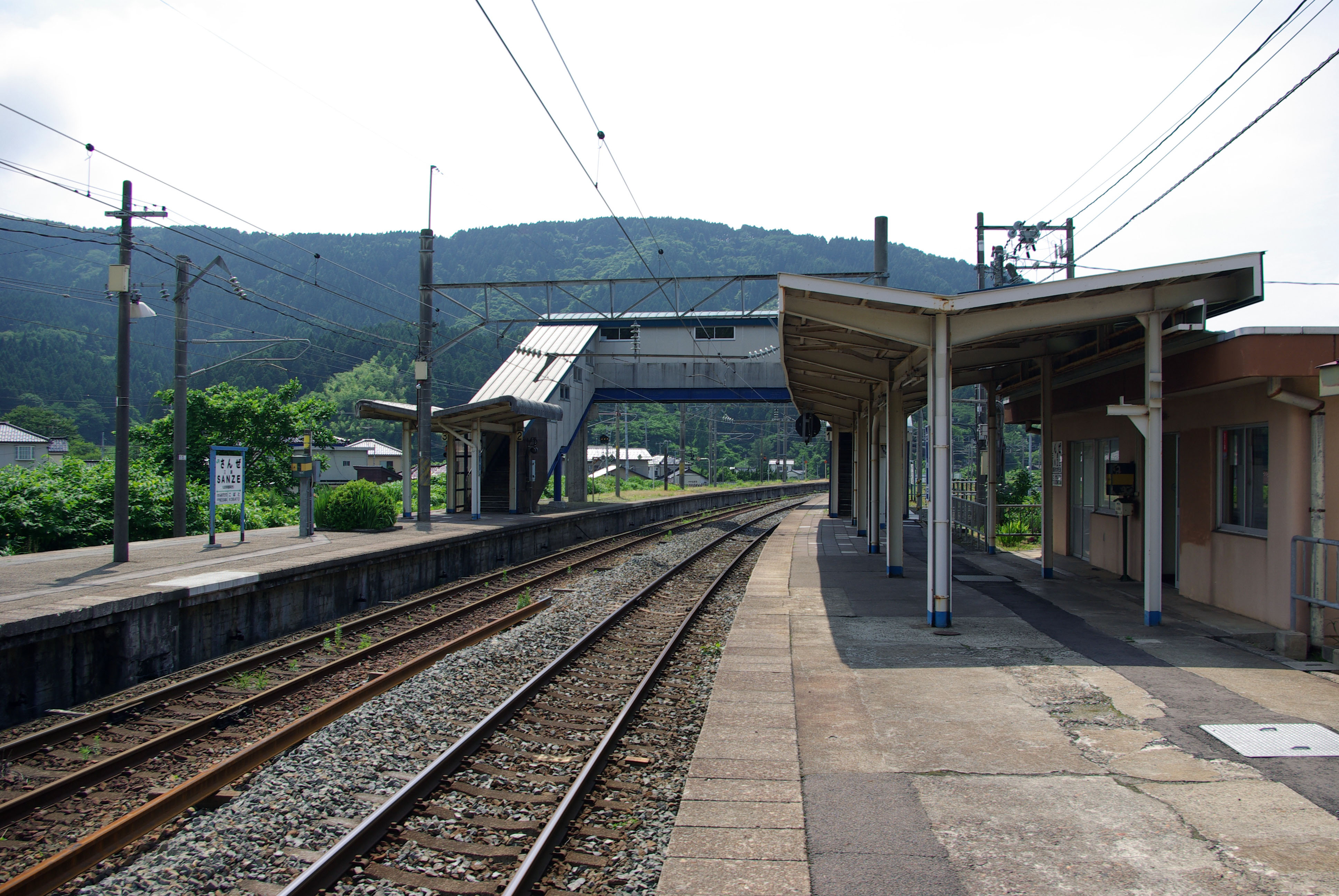
- Sanze Station (2004)

General information
- Location: 88 Sanzecho, Tsuruoka-shi, Yamagata-ken 999-7463; Japan
- Coordinates: 38°41′58.3″N 139°40′24.7″E
- Operator: JR East
- Line: ■ Uetsu Main Line
- Distance: 123.2 kilometers from Niitsu
- Platforms: 1 side + 1 island platform

Other information
- Status: Unstaffed
- Website: Official website

History
- Opened: May 22, 1922

Services
Preceding station	JR East	Following station
Kobato towards Niitsu	Uetsu Main Line	Uzen-Mizusawa towards Akita
Location
- Location within Yamagata Prefecture Location within Japan

Sanze Station (三瀬駅, Sanze-eki) is a railway station located in the city of Tsuruoka, Yamagata Prefecture, Japan, operated by the East Japan Railway Company (JR East).

== Lines ==
Sanze Station is served by the Uetsu Main Line, and is located 123.2 kilometres (76.6 mi) rail kilometers from the terminus of the line at Niitsu Station.

== Station layout ==
The station has one side platform and one island platform connected to the station building by a footbridge. The station is unattended.

=== Platforms ===
1	■ Uetsu Main Line	for Tsuruoka, Amarume and Sakata
2	■ Uetsu Main Line	passing loop
3	■ Uetsu Main Line	for Atsumi Onsen and Murakami

== History ==
Sanze Station was opened on May 22, 1922. A new station building was completed in November 1981. With the privatization of the JNR on April 1, 1987, the station came under the control of the East Japan Railway Company.

== Surrounding area ==
- National Route 7
- Sanze Post Office

== See also ==
- List of railway stations in Japan
