= Kobato Station =

Railway station in Tsuruoka, Yamagata Prefecture, Japan

Kobato Station 小波渡駅
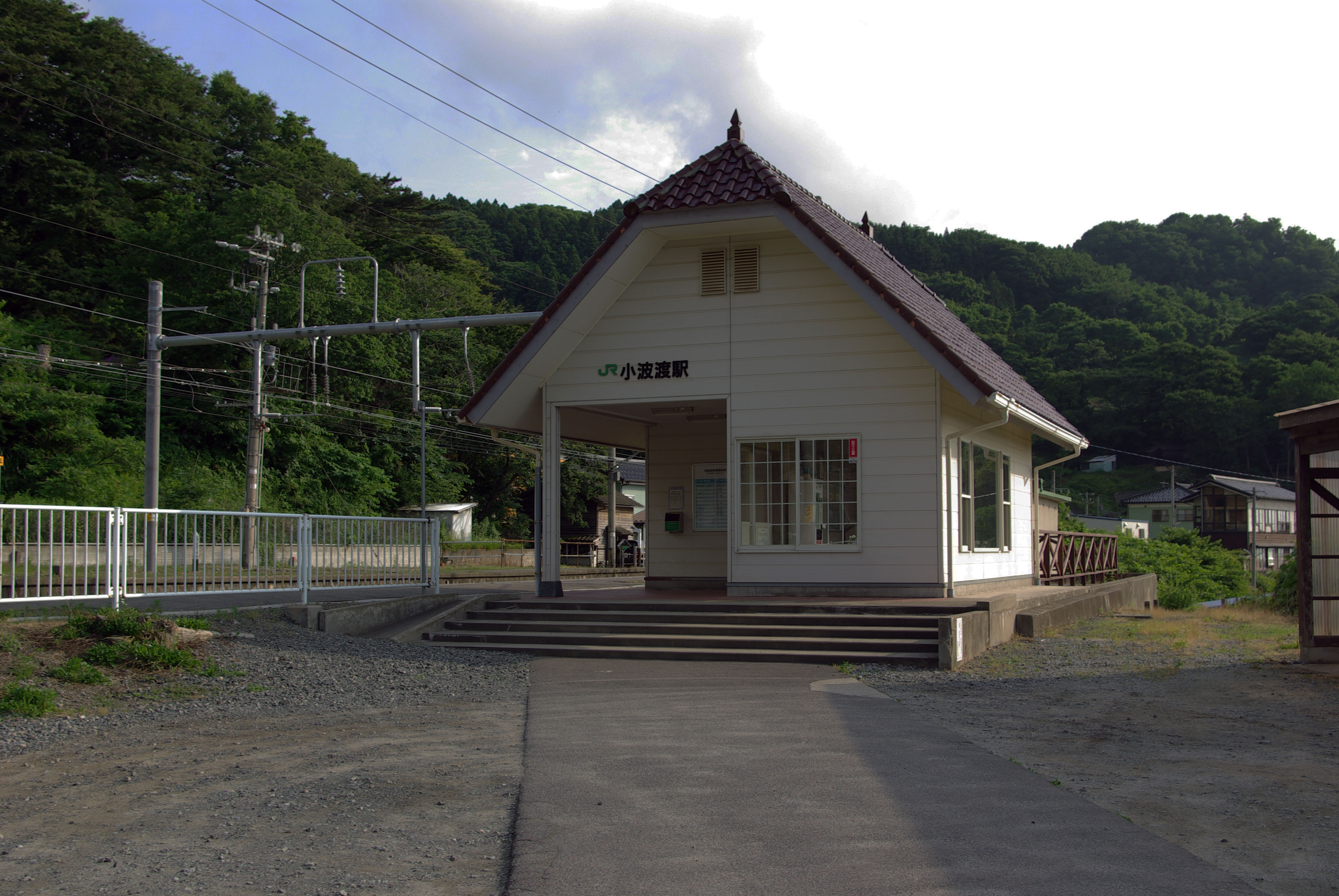
- Kobato Station, July 2009

General information
- Location: Kobato, Tsuruoka-shi, Yamagata-ken 999-7462; Japan
- Coordinates: 38°41′32.5″N 139°38′57.9″E
- Operator: JR East
- Line: ■ Uetsu Main Line
- Distance: 120.1 kilometers from Niitsu
- Platforms: 2 side platforms

Other information
- Status: Unstaffed
- Website: Official website

History
- Opened: February 1, 1950

Services
Preceding station	JR East	Following station
Iragawa towards Niitsu	Uetsu Main Line	Sanze towards Akita
Location
- Location within Yamagata Prefecture Location within Japan

Kobato Station (小波渡駅, Kobato-eki) is a railway station in the city of Tsuruoka, Yamagata, Japan, operated by East Japan Railway Company (JR East).

== Lines ==
Kobato Station is served by the Uetsu Main Line, and is located 120.1 kilometres (74.6 mi) rail kilometers from the terminus of the line at Niitsu Station.

== Station layout ==
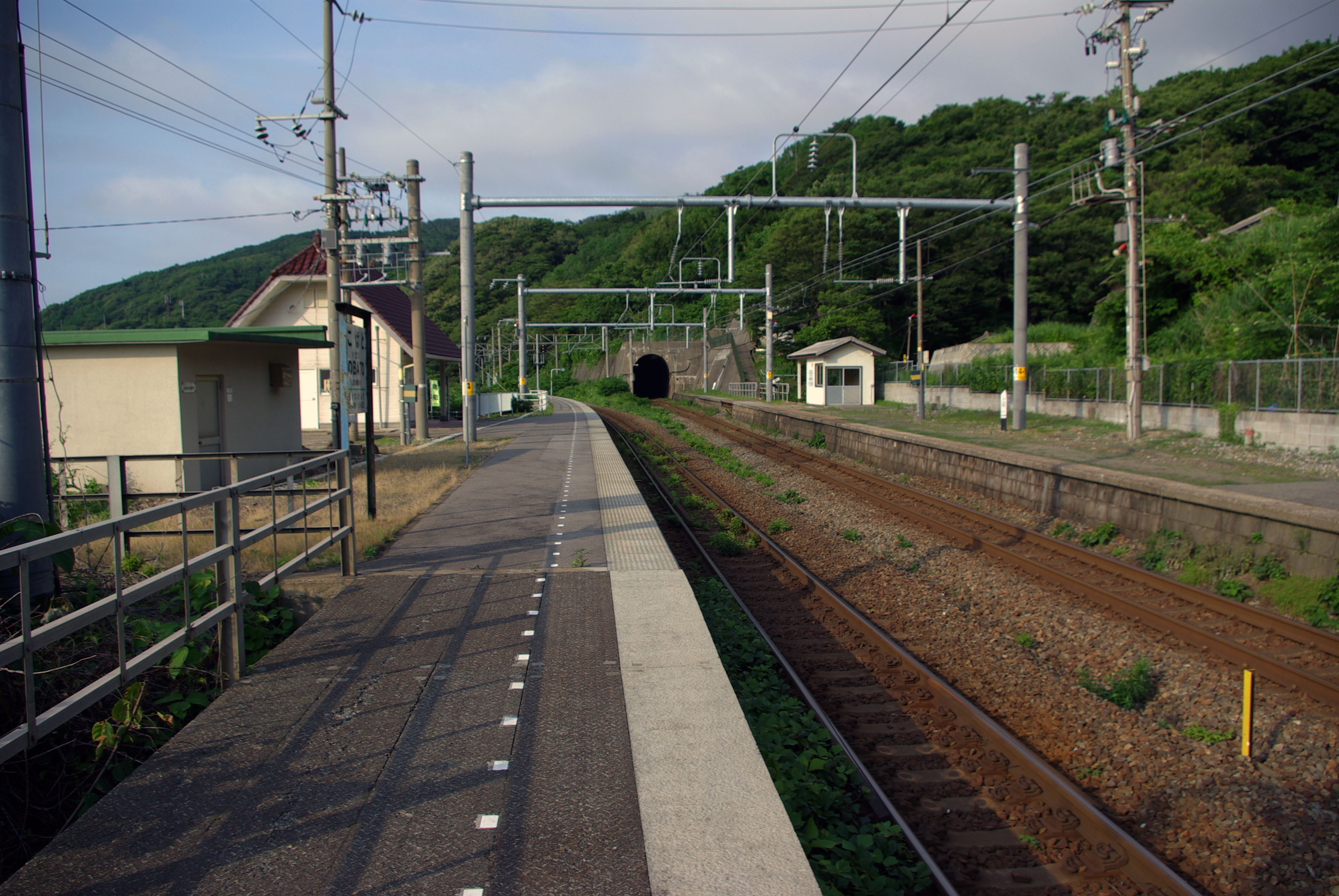
The platforms, July 2009

Kobato Station has two opposed side platforms serving two tracks. The platforms are connected by an underground passageway. The station is unattended.

=== Platforms ===
1	■ Uetsu Main Line	for Tsuruoka, Amarume, and Sakata
2	■ Uetsu Main Line	for Atsumi Onsen and Murakami

== History ==
Kobato Station opened on February 1, 1950. With the privatization of JNR on April 1, 1987, the station came under the control of JR East.

== Surrounding area ==
The station is located in a rural area, with no residential or commercial buildings in the vicinity.

== See also ==
- List of railway stations in Japan
