= Uzen-Mizusawa Station =

Railway station in Tsuruoka, Yamagata Prefecture, Japan

Uzen-Mizusawa Station 羽前水沢駅
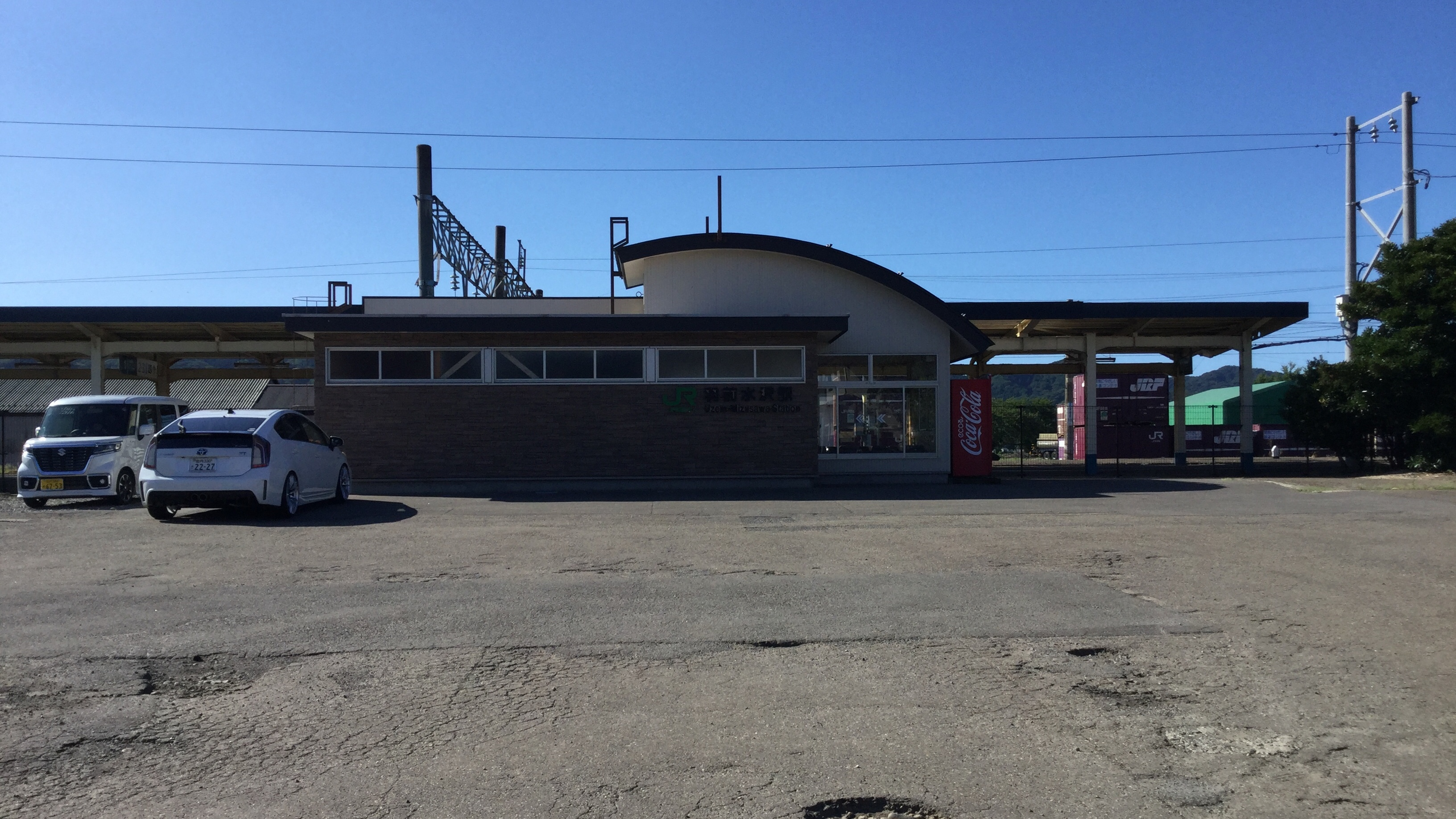
- Uzen-Mizusawa Station. August 2019

General information
- Location: 74 Ōarai, Tsuruoka-shi, Yamagata-ken; Japan
- Coordinates: 38°42′50.1″N 139°43′57.6″E
- Operator: JR East
- Line: ■ Uetsu Main Line
- Distance: 128.9 kilometers from Niitsu
- Platforms: 1 side + 2 island platforms

Other information
- Status: Unstaffed
- Website: Official website

History
- Opened: September 5, 1926

Services
Preceding station	JR East	Following station
Sanze towards Niitsu	Uetsu Main Line	Uzen-Ōyama towards Akita
Location
- Location within Yamagata Prefecture Location within Japan

Uzen-Mizusawa Station (羽前水沢駅, Uzen-Mizusawa-eki) is a railway station located in the city of Tsuruoka, Yamagata Prefecture, Japan, operated by the East Japan Railway Company (JR East).

== Lines ==
Uzen-Mizusawa Station is served by the Uetsu Main Line, and is located 128.9 kilometres (80.1 mi) rail kilometers from the terminus of the line at Niitsu Station.

== Station layout ==
The station has one side platform and one island platform connected to the station building by a footbridge. The station is unattended.

=== Platforms ===
1	■ Uetsu Main Line	for Atsumi Onsen and Murakami
2	■ Uetsu Main Line	passing loop
3	■ Uetsu Main Line	for Tsuruoka, Amarume and Sakata

== History ==
Uzen-Mizusawa Station was opened on September 5, 1926. With the privatization of the JNR on April 1, 1987, the station came under the control of the East Japan Railway Company. A new station building was completed in October 2013.

== Surrounding area ==
- National Route 7

== See also ==
- List of railway stations in Japan
