= Nezugaseki Station =

Railway station in Tsuruoka, Yamagata Prefecture, Japan

Nezugaseki Station 鼠ヶ関駅
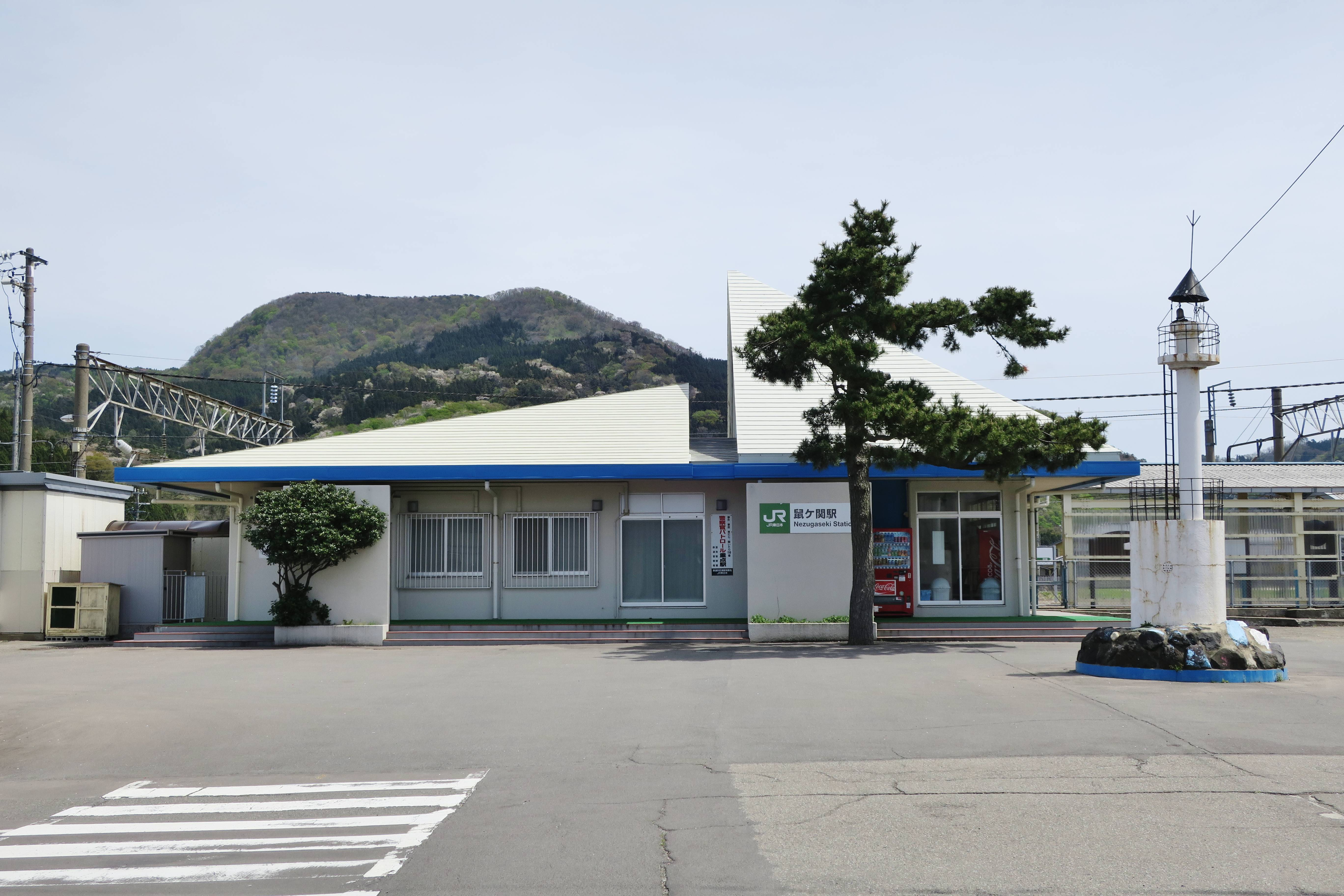
- Nezugaseki Station in April 2019

General information
- Location: Otsu-156-2 Nezugaseki, Tsuruoka-shi, Yamagata-ken 999-7126; Japan
- Coordinates: 38°33′19.9″N 139°32′55.8″E
- Operator: JR East
- Line: ■ Uetsu Main Line
- Distance: 101.0 kilometers from Niitsu
- Platforms: 1 side + 1 island platform

Other information
- Status: Unstaffed
- Website: Official website

History
- Opened: November 23, 1923

Services
Preceding station	JR East	Following station
Fuya towards Niitsu	Uetsu Main Line	Koiwagawa towards Akita
Location
- Location within Yamagata Prefecture Location within Japan

Nezugaseki Station (鼠ヶ関駅, Nezugaseki-eki) is a railway station in the city of Tsuruoka, Yamagata, Japan, operated by JR East. It is located on the border between Yamagata Prefecture and Niigata Prefecture.

== Lines ==
Nezugaseki Station is served by the Uetsu Main Line, and is located 101.0 kilometres (62.8 mi) from the terminus of the line at Niitsu Station.

== Station layout ==
The station has one island platform and one side platform connected to the station building by an underground passage. The station is unattended.

=== Platforms ===
1	■ Uetsu Main Line	for Tsuruoka, Atsumi Onsen and Sakata
2	■ Uetsu Main Line	passing loop
3	■ Uetsu Main Line	for Niitsu and Murakami

== History ==
Nezugaseki Station opened on November 23, 1923. A new station building was completed in October 1986. With the privatization of JNR on April 1, 1987, the station came under the control of JR East.

== Surrounding area ==
- Nezugaseki Marina
- Nezugaseki Post Office

== See also ==
- List of railway stations in Japan
