= Nihonkai (train) =

Seasonal overnight train in Japan

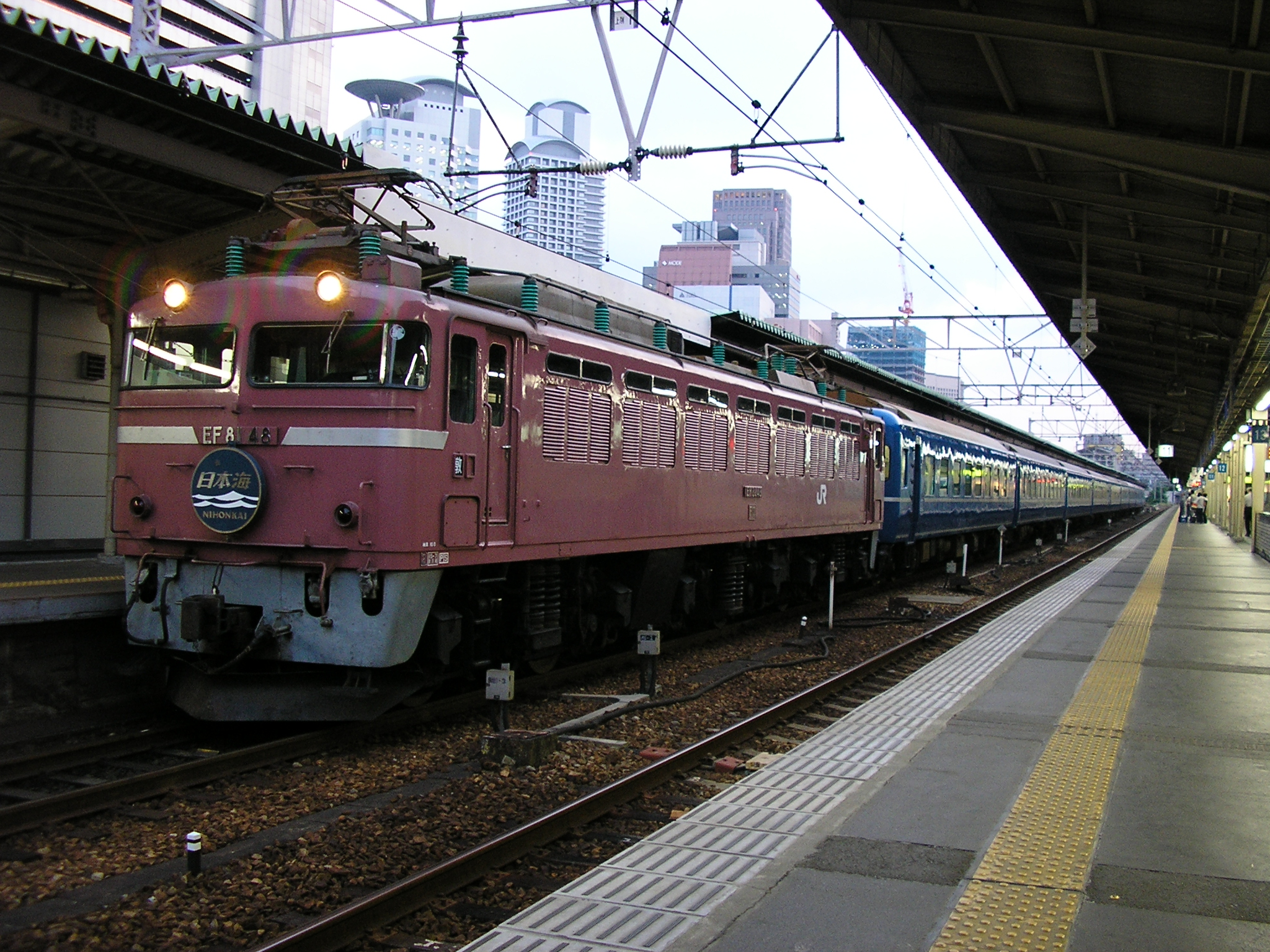
- EF81 locomotive on a Nihonkai train at Ōsaka Station in September 2006

Overview
- Service type: Limited express
- Status: Discontinued
- Locale: Honshu, Japan
- First service: 1950
- Last service: 2013
- Current operator: JR East
- Former operator: JNR

Route
- Termini: Osaka; Aomori
- Lines used: Tōkaidō Main Line, Kosei Line, Hokuriku Main Line, Shinetsu Main Line, Uetsu Main Line, Ōu Main Line

Technical
- Rolling stock: 24 series sleeper coaches
- Track gauge: 1,067 mm (3 ft 6 in)
- Electrification: 1,500 V DC / 20 kV AC (50 Hz)
- Operating speed: 110 km/h (70 mph)

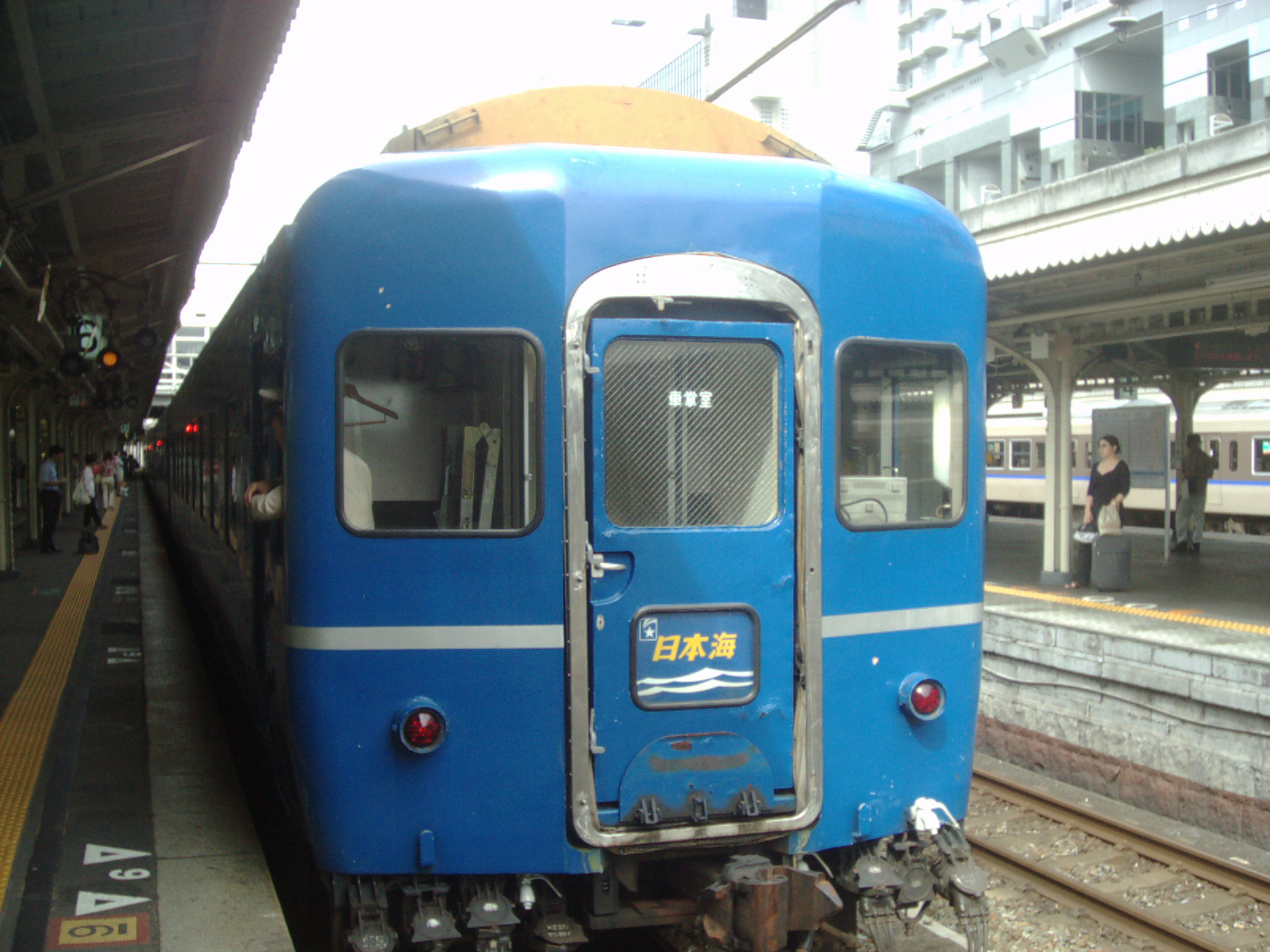
24 series passenger cars used on Nihonkai service (rear view)

The Nihonkai (日本海; 'Sea of Japan') was a seasonal overnight train which was operated by the East Japan Railway Company (JR East). The train ran overnight between Osaka Station and Aomori Station using the Tōkaidō Main Line, Kosei Line, Hokuriku Main Line, Shinetsu Main Line, Uetsu Main Line, and Ōu Main Line.

From the start of the March 17, 2012 timetable revision, regular operations of the Nihonkai were discontinued, with services operating during busy seasonal periods only. While JR East has not formally announced its discontinuation, no services have operated since January 2013, Sometimes it either connects to Sapporo or Hakodate.

== Operations ==
The Nihonkai operated between Osaka Station and Aomori Station on the following lines:

- Tōkaidō Main Line (JR Kyoto Line)
- Kosei Line
- Hokuriku Main Line
- Shinetsu Main Line
- Uetsu Main Line
- Ōu Main Line

There were two trains which operated daily. The journey time was around fifteen hours, depending on the exact route taken.

== Formation ==
=== Locomotive ===
The Nihonkai was hauled by a JNR Class EF81 electric locomotive based at Tsuruga and operated by JR West Fukui Operations Center.

=== Passenger cars ===
- 24 series cars based at JR East Aomori depot

- Generator car: Kani 24
- Car No. 1: Orone 25-300: Class A single deluxe private compartments
- Car No. 2: Ohane 25: Class B open compartment couchettes
- Car No. 3: Ohane 25: Class B open compartment couchettes
- Car No. 4: Ohanefu 25: Class B open compartment couchettes
- Car No. 5: Ohanefu 25: Class B open compartment couchettes
- Car No. 6: Ohane 25: Class B open compartment couchettes
- Car No. 7: Ohane 25: Class B open compartment couchettes
- Car No. 8: Ohanefu 25: Class B open compartment couchettes
- Car Nos. 9-11: Ohane 25: Class B open compartment couchettes
- Car No. 12: Ohanefu 25: Class B open compartment couchettes
- During the off-season, Car Nos. 9-12 are not used.

== Designated stops ==
- ●：Stop
- ↓・↑：Pass, does not stop
- or indicates areas where the Class B cars can be used as a normal (non-sleeper) Limited Express seat.
  - indicates a Standing Seat Limited Express Ticket is required.
  - indicates a Reserved Seat Ticket is required.

Station	↓	↑
Osaka	●	●
Shin-Osaka	●	●
Kyoto	●	●
Tsuruga	●	●
Fukui	●	●
Kagaonsen	●	●
Kanazawa	●	●
Takaoka	●	●
Toyama	●	●
Uozu	●	●
Itoigawa	●	●
Naoetsu	●	●
Niitsu	●	↑
Tsuruoka	●	●
Sakata	●	●
Ugo-Honjō	●	●
Akita	●	●
Higashi-Noshiro	●	●
Takanosu	●	●
Ōdate	●	●
Ōwani	●	●
Hirosaki	●	●
Shin-Aomori	●	●
Aomori	●	●

== History ==
- July 31, 1924: With the completion of the Uetsu Main Line, an express running between Kōbe Station and Aomori Station was created, however from Toyama Station north, it ran as an all-stations "Local" service.
- August 15, 1926: The entire trip to Aomori Station was switched to "Express" status.
- September 15, 1929: The service schedule was revised so that travel was between Osaka Station and Aomori Station.
- February 1, 1943: The express train between Osaka Station and Aomori Station ceased operation.
- July 5, 1947: An express train that would become the origin of the Nihonkai began passenger service between Osaka and Aomori.
- November 8, 1950: The above-mentioned express train was formally christened Nihonkai.
- February 9, 1961: While the Nihonkai was traveling on the Uetsu Main Line, the ground under the tracks collapsed causing a derailment. The JNR Class C57 steam locomotive was seriously damaged.
- October 1, 1968: With the introduction of the 20 series Passenger Car (Sleeper Car), the Nihonkai became an Overnight Limited Express train. Furthermore, the Nihonkai became a newly created Overnight Limited Express, the former Overnight Express became the new Kitaguni.
- 1969: While in the Hokuriku Tunnel a fire broke out on board the Nihonkai. Three years later, on board the Kitaguni an identical fire broke out, and killed thirty people.
- March 10, 1975: The Nihonkai began using the Kosei Line. Also, the change to 14 series passenger cars was made, however the inclusion of a dining car was ceased. The 14 series cars which were used for special and seasonal trains began running two trains in each direction. Later in 1976, the train switched to using 24/25 series cars. At this time, the use of a train headboard on the locomotive was discontinued.
- October 2, 1978: The Nihonkai, which had been running as a seasonal train, was upgraded to regular service, running one train in each direction. All trains used 24/25 series cars following the withdrawal of 14 series cars from service.
- November 15, 1982: The Kitaguni, which ran over the same route as the Nihonkai, was changed to service Niigata Station. Because of this, the number of overnight trains serving Aomori Station from Osaka Station was reduced to just one.
- February 1, 1984: The use of the Nihonkai locomotive headboard was resumed.
- 1986: During the summer, Nihonkai 1 and 4 had a Mani 50 luggage car attached in order to carry motorbikes. This ceased in 1998.
- 1987: Nihonkai 2 and 3 began operating with Class A accommodation cars.
- March 12, 1988: With the opening of the Seikan Tunnel, JR West extended the Nihonkai service from Aomori Station to Hakodate Station. On the day before the tunnel was to open 12 March, the first Hakodate Station bound train left Osaka Station. The next day when the tunnel was opened, the overnight Limited Express Hokutosei was already en route and holds the honor of being the first overnight train to pass through the tunnel.
- 1989: The Twilight Express, operating to and from Sapporo Station, began operation. However, in consideration of Nihonkai 1 and 4, the Twilight Express did not stop in Oshima Subprefecture. It stopped only in Iburi Subprefecture and Ishikari Subprefecture.
- December 1998: After the overnight Limited Express Seto was changed to 285 series electric multiple unit rolling stock, an excess of 25 series Class A Single Deluxe Private Compartment Cars became available and then began use on Nihonkai 1 and 4.
- October 23–November 28, 2004: Due to the effects of the Niigata-ken Chūetsu earthquake, all trains on all lines in Niigata Prefecture stopped running.
- November 29, 2004: Nihonkai 1 and 4 resumed service. However, when operating between Nagaoka Station and Kashiwazaki Station, trains operated at very slow speeds. Nihonkai 2 and 3 did not resume service for some time after the earthquake.
- December 13, 2004: Nihonkai 2 and 3 resumed service. As above, it operated at slow speed.
- December 25, 2005 – January 18, 2006: Due to a derailment accident on the Uetsu Main Line, all trains on the line ceased operations.
- March 18, 2006: Due to a decrease in the number of passengers, Nihonkai 1 and 4 ceased service to Hakodate Station, and returned to originating and terminating at Aomori Station.
- July 13–August 8, 2006: Service is suspended due to a landslide on the Uetsu Main Line between Koiwagawa Station and Atsumi Onsen Station.
- December 25, 2007: JR West announces that the Nihonkai 2 and 3 services will be discontinued from the March 15, 2008 timetable revision due to falling passenger numbers.
- December 4, 2010: With the start of Tohoku Shinkansen services between Hachinohe and Shin-Aomori stations, the Nihonkai added Shin-Aomori as a stop with the timetable revision.
- March 11–March 17, 2011: Due to the 2011 Tōhoku earthquake and tsunami, service was suspended.
- March 17, 2012: Regular daily services are discontinued.

== See also ==
- List of named passenger trains of Japan
