= Echigo-Kangawa Station =

Railway station in Murakami, Niigata Prefecture, Japan

Echigo-Kangawa Station 越後寒川駅
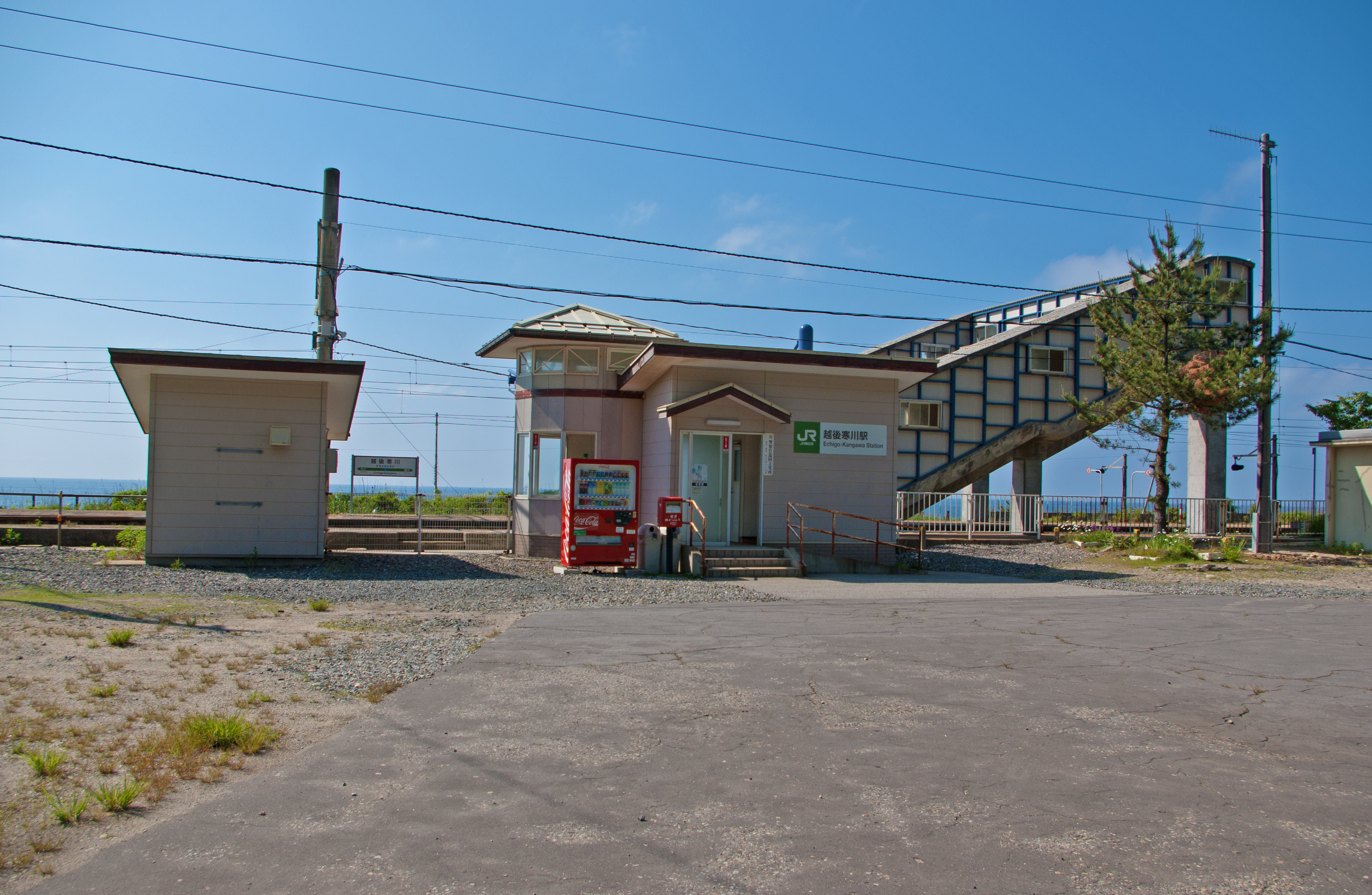
- Echigo-Kangawa Station in June 2010

General information
- Location: Kangawa, Murakami-shi, Niigata-ken 959-2026; Japan
- Coordinates: 38°26′55.4″N 139°29′24.2″E
- Operator: JR East
- Line: ■ Uetsu Main Line
- Distance: 87.5 km from Niitsu
- Platforms: 1 side + 1 island platforms
- Tracks: 3

Other information
- Status: Unstaffed
- Website: Official website

History
- Opened: 31 July 1924

Services
Preceding station	JR East	Following station
Imagawa towards Niitsu	Uetsu Main Line	Gatsugi towards Akita
Location
- Location within Japan

Echigo-Kangawa Station (越後寒川駅, Echigo-Kangawa eki) is a railway station in the city of Murakami, Niigata, Japan, operated by East Japan Railway Company (JR East).

== Lines ==
Echigo-Kangawa Station is served by the Uetsu Main Line, and is 87.5 kilometers from the starting point of the line at Niitsu Station.

== Station layout ==
The station consists of one ground-level side platform and one island platform connected by a footbridge. The station is unattended.

=== Platforms ===
1, 2	■ Uetsu Main Line	for Murakami and Niitsu
3	■ Uetsu Main Line	for Tsuruoka and Sakata

== History ==
Echigo-Kangawa Station opened on 31 July 1924. With the privatization of Japanese National Railways (JNR) on 1 April 1987, the station came under the control of JR East.

== Surrounding area ==
- National Route 345

== See also ==
- List of railway stations in Japan
