= Iragawa Station =

Railway station in Tsuruoka, Yamagata Prefecture, Japan

Iragawa Station 五十川駅
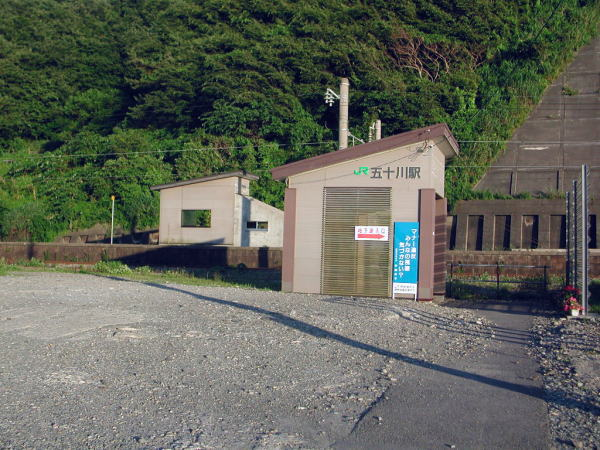
- Iragawa Station, JUly 2004

General information
- Location: Iragawa, Tsuruoka-shi, Yamagata-ken 999-7207; Japan
- Coordinates: 38°40′14.3″N 139°36′58.1″E
- Operator: JR East
- Line: ■ Uetsu Main Line
- Distance: 115.7 kilometers from Niitsu
- Platforms: 1 island platform

Other information
- Status: Unstaffed
- Website: Official website

History
- Opened: March 18, 1923

Services
Preceding station	JR East	Following station
Atsumi Onsen towards Niitsu	Uetsu Main Line	Kobato towards Akita
Location
- Location within Yamagata Prefecture Location within Japan

Iragawa Station (五十川駅, Iragawa-eki) is a railway station in the city of Tsuruoka, Yamagata, Japan, operated by East Japan Railway Company (JR East).

== Lines ==
Iragawa Station is served by the Uetsu Main Line, and is located 115.7 kilometres (71.9 mi) rail kilometers from the terminus of the line at Niitsu Station.

== Station layout ==
Iragawa Station has a single island platform serving two tracks, connected to the small station building by an underground passage. The station is unattended.

=== Platforms ===
1	■ Uetsu Main Line	for Tsuruoka, Amarume, and Sakata
2	■ Uetsu Main Line	for Atsumi Onsen and Murakami

== History ==
Iragawa Station opened on March 18, 1923. With the privatization of JNR on April 1, 1987, the station came under the control of JR East.

== Surrounding area ==
- Iragawa Post Office
- National Route 7

== See also ==
- List of railway stations in Japan
