= Gatsugi Station =

Railway station in Murakami, Niigata Prefecture, Japan

Gatsugi Station 勝木駅
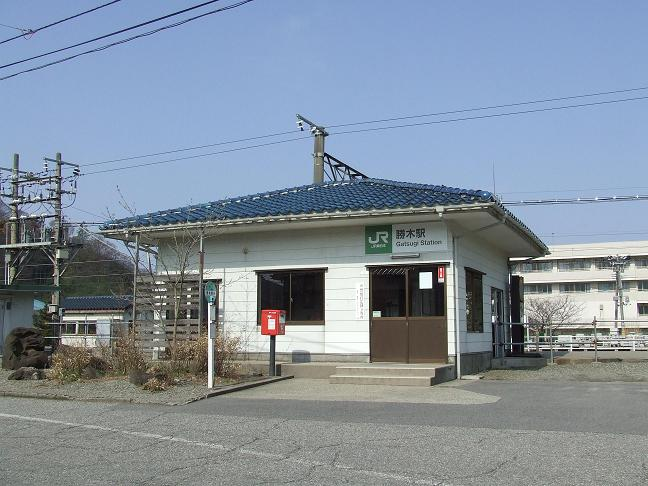
- Gatsugi Station in April 2010

General information
- Location: Gatsugi, Murakami-shi, Niigata-ken 959-2026; Japan
- Coordinates: 38°29′25.1″N 139°31′2.9″E
- Operator: JR East
- Line: ■ Uetsu Main Line
- Distance: 92.8 km from Niitsu
- Platforms: 2 side platforms
- Tracks: 2

Other information
- Status: Unstaffed
- Website: Official website

History
- Opened: 31 July 1924

Services
Preceding station	JR East	Following station
Echigo-Kangawa towards Niitsu	Uetsu Main Line	Fuya towards Akita
Location
- Location within Japan

Gatsugi Station (勝木駅, Gatsugi eki) is a railway station in the city of Murakami, Niigata, Japan, operated by East Japan Railway Company (JR East).

== Lines ==
Gatsugi Station is served by the Uetsu Main Line, and is 92.8 kilometers from the starting point of the line at Niitsu Station.

== Station layout ==
The station consists of two ground-level opposed side platforms connected by a footbridge. The station is unattended.

=== Platforms ===
1	■ Uetsu Main Line	for Murakami and Niitsu
2	■ Uetsu Main Line	for Tsuruoka and Sakata

== History ==
Gatsugi Station opened on 31 July 1924. With the privatization of Japanese National Railways (JNR) on 1 April 1987, the station came under the control of JR East.

== Surrounding area ==
- Gatsugi Post Office
- National Route 7
- National Route 35

== See also ==
- List of railway stations in Japan
