= Fuya Station =

Railway station in Murakami, Niigata Prefecture, Japan

Fuya Station 府屋駅
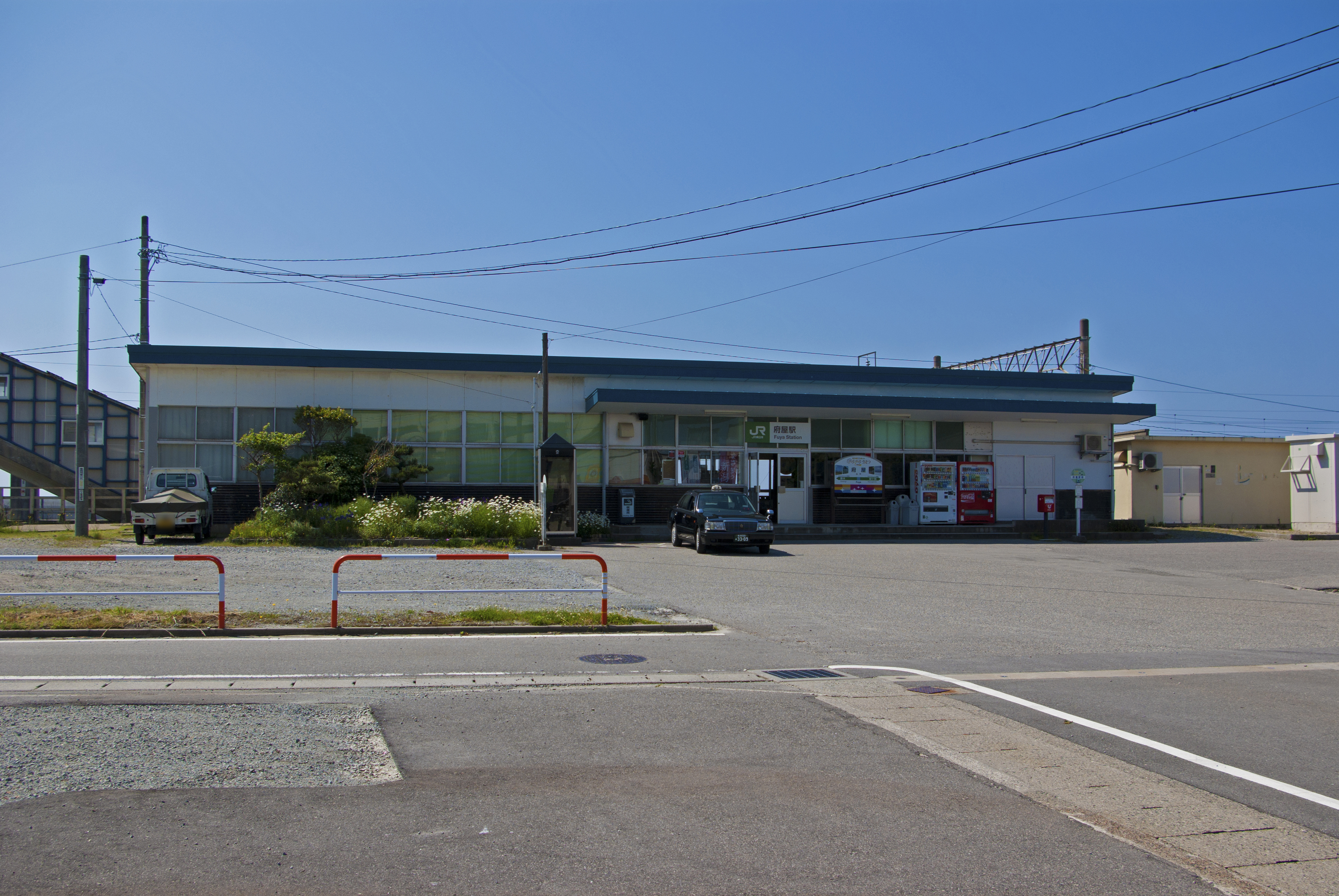
- Fuya Station in June 2010

General information
- Location: Fuya, Murakami-shi, Niigata-ken 959-2026 新潟県村上市府屋; Japan
- Coordinates: 38°30′50.6″N 139°31′52.7″E
- Operator: JR East
- Line: ■ Uetsu Main Line
- Distance: 95.9 km from Niitsu
- Platforms: 1 side + 1 island platforms
- Tracks: 3

Other information
- Website: Official website

History
- Opened: 31 July 1924

Passengers
- FY2017: 95

Services
Preceding station	JR East	Following station
Murakami towards Niigata	Inaho	Atsumi Onsen towards Akita
Gatsugi towards Niitsu	Uetsu Main Line	Nezugaseki towards Akita
Location
- Location within Japan

Fuya Station (府屋駅, Fuya eki) is a railway station in the city of Murakami, Niigata, Japan, operated by East Japan Railway Company (JR East).

== Lines ==
Fuya Station is served by the Uetsu Main Line, and is 95.9 kilometers from the starting point of the line at Niitsu Station.

== Station layout ==
The station consists of one ground-level side platform and one island platform connected by a footbridge. However, only one side of the island platform is in normal use. The station is unstaffed, but there is an automatic ticket vending machine.

=== Platforms ===
1	■ Uetsu Main Line	for Murakami and Niitsu
2	■ Uetsu Main Line	(siding)
3	■ Uetsu Main Line	for Tsuruoka and Sakata

== History ==
Fuya Station opened on 31 July 1924. With the privatization of Japanese National Railways (JNR) on 1 April 1987, the station came under the control of JR East.

== Passenger statistics ==
In fiscal 2017, the station was used by an average of 95 passengers daily (boarding passengers only).

== Surrounding area ==
- former Yamakita Town Hall
- National Route 7

== See also ==
- List of railway stations in Japan
