= Imagawa Station =

Imagawa Station (今川駅) is the name of two train stations in Japan:

- Imagawa Station (Niigata)
- Imagawa Station (Osaka)
