= Nihonkai =

Nihonkai (日本海) may refer to:

- Sea of Japan, the body of water between Japan, Korea and Russia
- Nihonkai (train), an overnight sleeping car train service that ran along the Sea of Japan coastline
- Nihonkai Telecasting, a television broadcaster in Tottori Prefecture and Shimane Prefecture, Japan
