= Imagawa Station (Niigata) =

Railway station in Murakami, Niigata Prefecture, Japan

Imagawa Station 今川駅
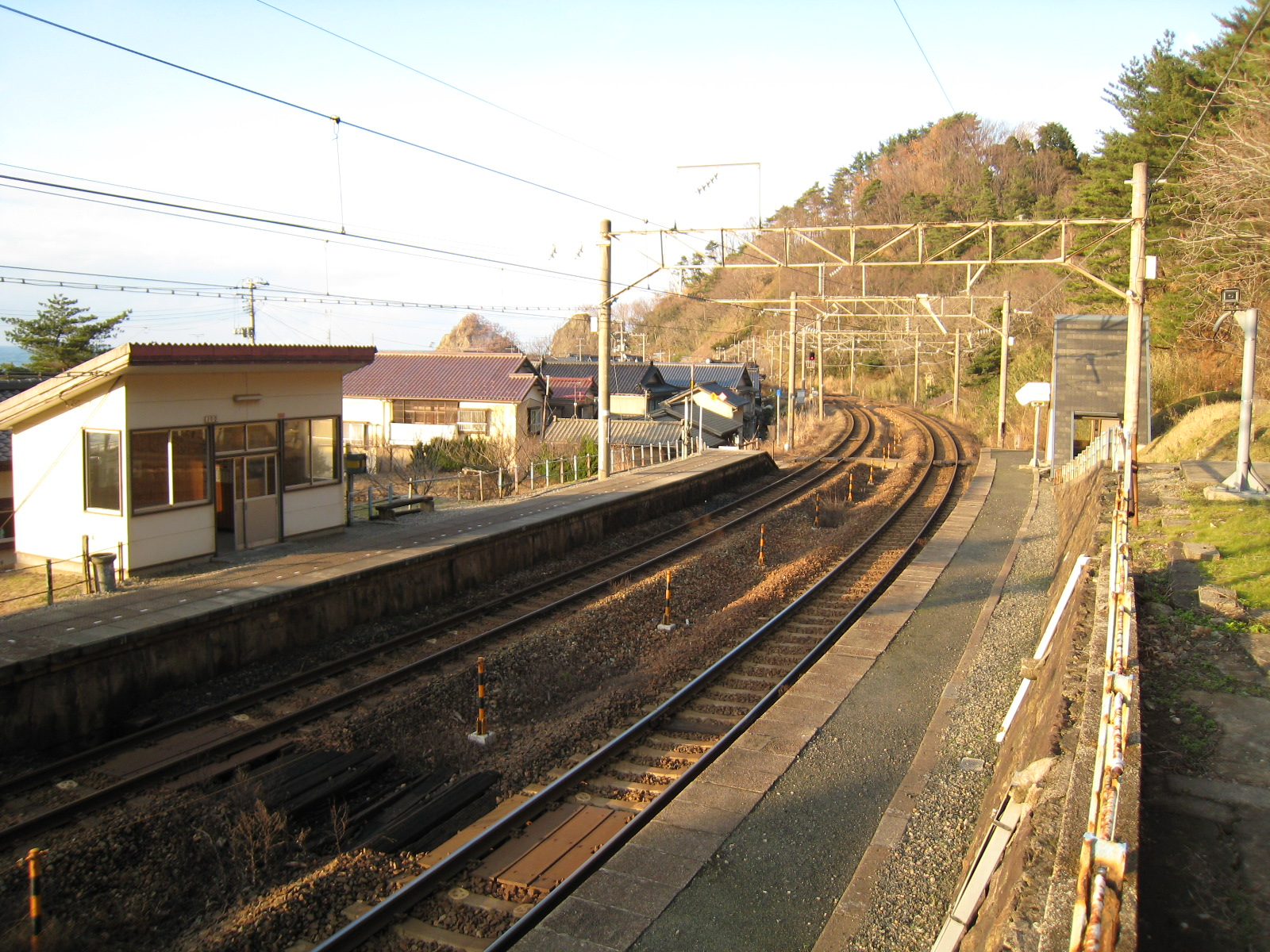
- Imagawa Station platforms, February 2010

General information
- Location: Imagawa, Murakami-shi, Niigata-ken 959-2026; Japan
- Coordinates: 38°24′36.3″N 139°28′6.2″E
- Operator: JR East
- Line: ■ Uetsu Main Line
- Distance: 82.6 km from Niitsu
- Platforms: 2 side platforms
- Tracks: 2

Other information
- Status: Unstaffed
- Website: Official website

History
- Opened: 1 April 1987

Services
Preceding station	JR East	Following station
Kuwagawa towards Niitsu	Uetsu Main Line	Echigo-Kangawa towards Akita
Location
- Location within Japan

Imagawa Station (今川駅, Imagawa eki) is a railway station in the city of Murakami, Niigata, Japan, operated by East Japan Railway Company (JR East).

== Lines ==
Imagawa Station is served by the Uetsu Main Line, and is 82.6 kilometers from the starting point of the line at Niitsu Station.

== Station layout ==
The station consists of two ground-level opposed side platforms connected by a level crossing. The station is unattended.

=== Platforms ===
1	■ Uetsu Main Line	for Murakami and Niitsu
2	■ Uetsu Main Line	for Tsuruoka and Sakata

== History ==
Imagawa Station opened on 1 April 1987.

== Surrounding area ==
- Imagawa Swimming Beach
- National Route 345

== See also ==
- List of railway stations in Japan
