= Koiwagawa Station =

Railway station in Tsuruoka, Yamagata Prefecture, Japan

Koiwagawa Station 小岩川駅
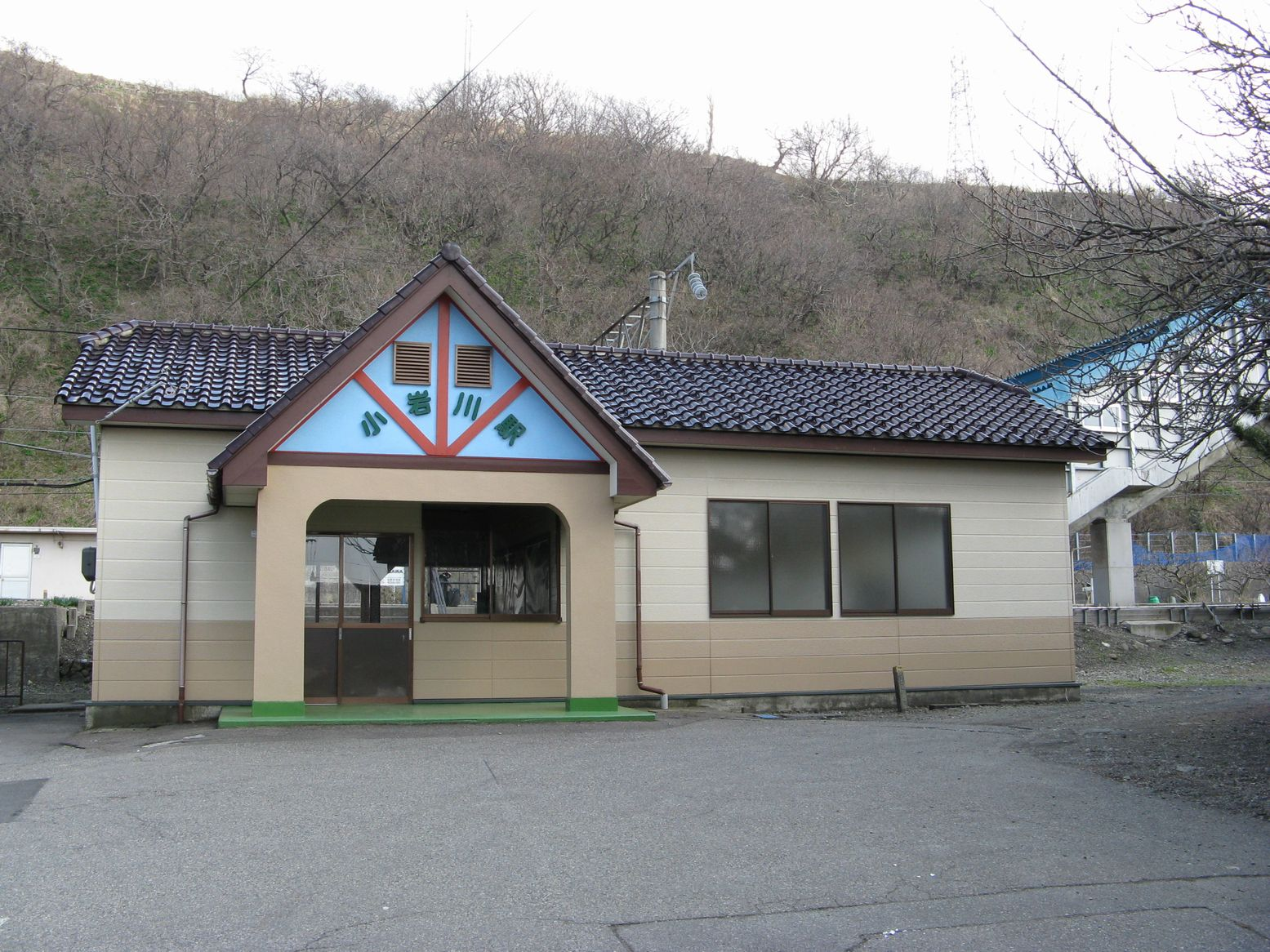
- Koiwagawa Station in April 2008

General information
- Location: Koiwagawa, Tsuruoka-shi, Yamagata-ken 999-7122; Japan
- Coordinates: 38°35′25.6″N 139°33′57.3″E
- Operator: JR East
- Line: ■ Uetsu Main Line
- Distance: 105.4 kilometers from Niitsu
- Platforms: 2 side platforms

Other information
- Status: Unstaffed
- Website: Official website

History
- Opened: February 1, 1950

Services
Preceding station	JR East	Following station
Nezugaseki towards Niitsu	Uetsu Main Line	Atsumi Onsen towards Akita
Location
- Location within Yamagata Prefecture Location within Japan

Koiwagawa Station (小岩川駅, Koiwagawa-eki) is a railway station in the city of Tsuruoka, Yamagata, Japan, operated by East Japan Railway Company (JR East).

== Lines ==
Koiwagawa Station is served by the Uetsu Main Line, and is located 105.4 kilometres (65.5 mi) from the terminus of the line at Niitsu Station.

== Station layout ==
The station has two opposed side platforms connected to the station building by a footbridge. The station is unattended.

=== Platforms ===
1	■ Uetsu Main Line	for Tsuruoka, Atsumi Onsen, and Sakata
2	■ Uetsu Main Line	for Niitsu and Murakami

== History ==
Koiwagawa Station opened on February 1, 1950. With the privatization of JNR on April 1, 1987, the station came under the control of JR East.

== Surrounding area ==
- National Route 7
- Koiwagawa Post Office

== See also ==
- List of railway stations in Japan
