= Atsumi Onsen Station =

Railway station in Tsuruoka, Yamagata Prefecture, Japan

Atsumi Onsen Station あつみ温泉駅
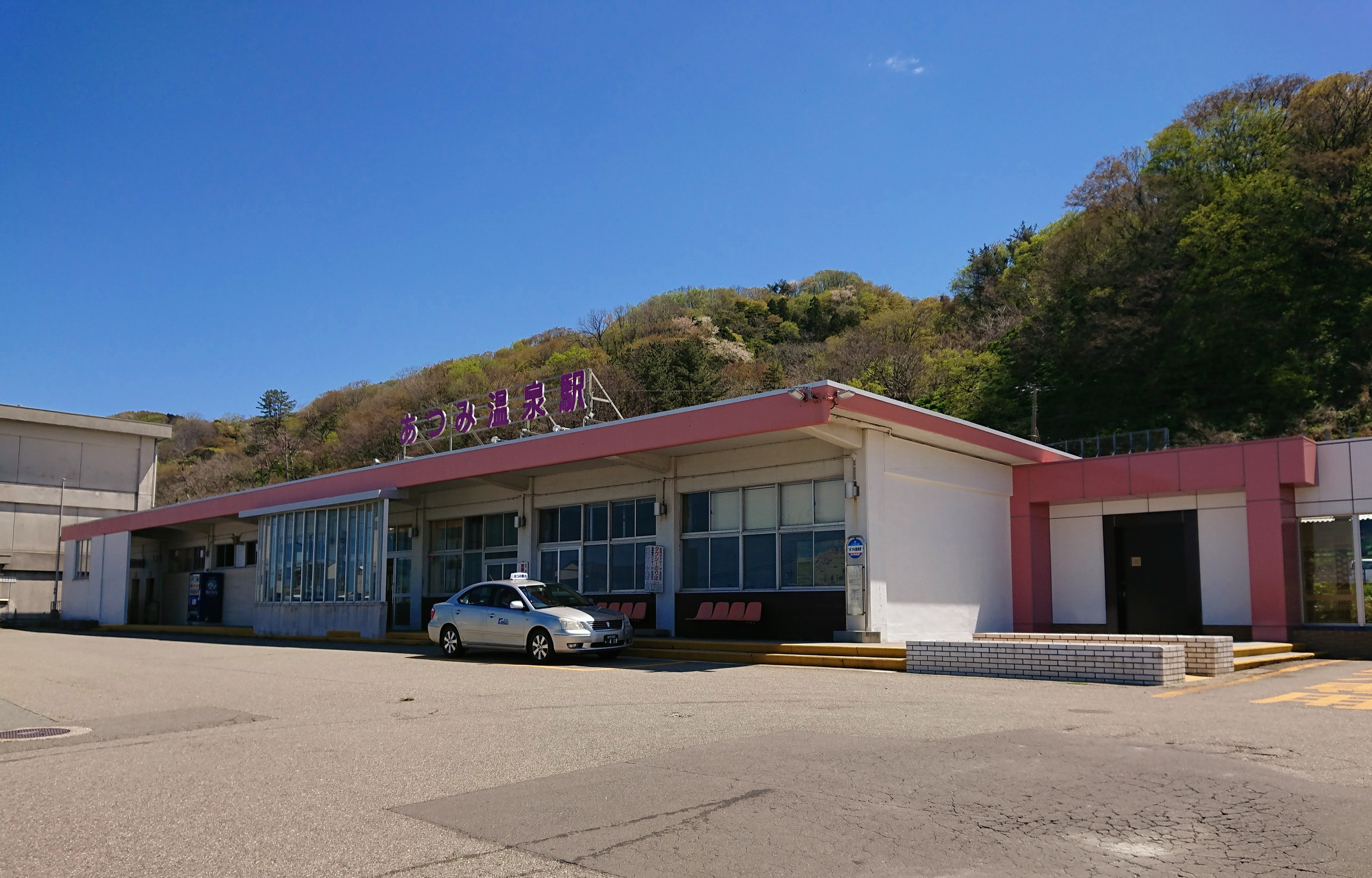
- Atsumi Onsen Station, April 2019

General information
- Location: Atsumi Tsuruoka-shi, Yamagata-ken 999-7205; Japan
- Coordinates: 38°37′27.4″N 139°35′16.8″E
- Operator: JR East
- Line: ■ Uetsu Main Line
- Distance: 109.8 kilometers from Niitsu
- Platforms: 2 side platforms

Other information
- Status: Staffed (Midori no Madoguchi)
- Website: Official website

History
- Opened: March 18, 1923
- Former names: Atsumi (until 1977)

Passengers
- FY2018: 101

Services
Preceding station	JR East	Following station
Fuya towards Niigata	Inaho	Tsuruoka towards Akita
Koiwagawa towards Niitsu	Uetsu Main Line	Iragawa towards Akita
Location
- Location within Yamagata Prefecture Location within Japan

Atsumi Onsen Station (あつみ温泉駅, Atsumi Onsen-eki) is a railway station in the city of Tsuruoka, Yamagata, Japan, operated by East Japan Railway Company (JR East).

== Lines ==
Atsumi Onsen Station is served by the Uetsu Main Line, and is located 109.8 kilometres (68.2 mi) rail kilometers from the terminus of the line at Niitsu Station.

== Station layout ==
Atsumi Onsen Station has a single island platform and a side platform, serving three tracks. The platforms are connected to the station building by an underground passageway. The station has a Midori no Madoguchi staffed ticket office.

=== Platforms ===
1	■ Uetsu Main Line	for Tsuruoka, Akita and Sakata
2	■ Uetsu Main Line	passing loop
3	■ Uetsu Main Line	for Niitsu and Murakami

== History ==
The station opened on March 18, 1923, as Atsumi Station (温海駅). A new station building was completed in December 1963. The station was renamed Atsumi Onsen Station on October 1, 1977. With the privatization of JNR on April 1, 1987, the station came under the control of JR East.

== Passenger statistics ==
In fiscal 2018, the station was used by an average of 101 passengers daily (boarding passengers only). The passenger figures for previous years are as shown below.

Fiscal year	Daily average
2000	271
2005	218
2010	133
2015	114

== Surrounding area ==
- Atsumi Onsen
- National Route 7

== See also ==
- List of railway stations in Japan
