= Murakami Station (Niigata) =

Railway station in Murakami, Niigata Prefecture, Japan

Murakami Station 村上駅
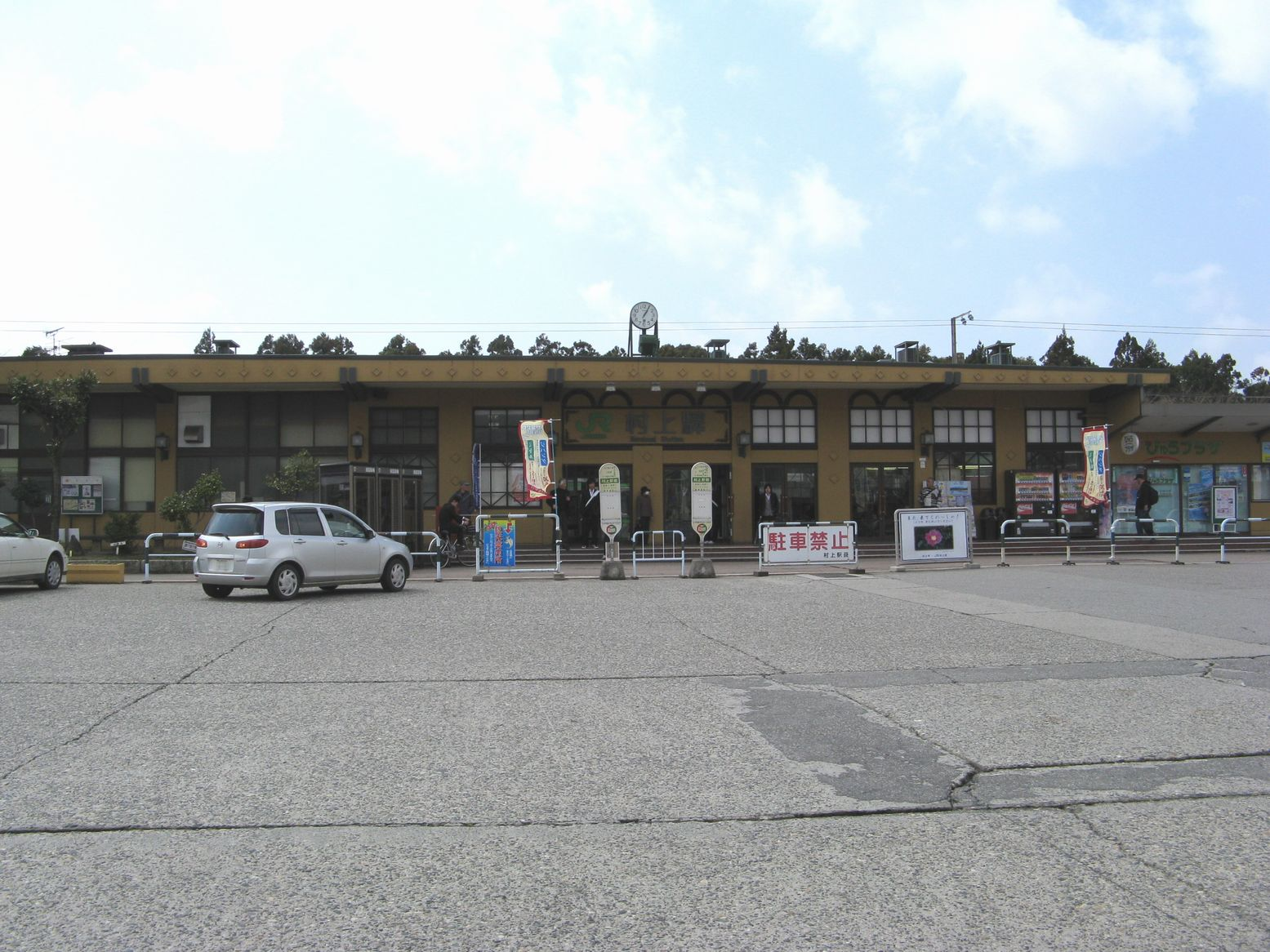
- Murakami Station, April 2008

General information
- Location: 11-11 Tabutamachi, Murakami-shi, Niigata-ken 958-0854; Japan
- Coordinates: 38°13′12.7″N 139°27′48.6″E
- Operator: JR East
- Line: ■ Uetsu Main Line
- Distance: 71.4 km from Niitsu
- Platforms: 1 side + 1 island platforms
- Tracks: 3

Other information
- Status: Staffed (Midori no Madoguchi)
- Website: Official website

History
- Opened: 1 November 1914

Passengers
- FY2017: 1663

Services
Preceding station	JR East	Following station
Sakamachi towards Niigata	Inaho	Fuya towards Akita
Iwafunemachi towards Niitsu	Uetsu Main Line	Majima towards Akita
Location
- Location within Japan

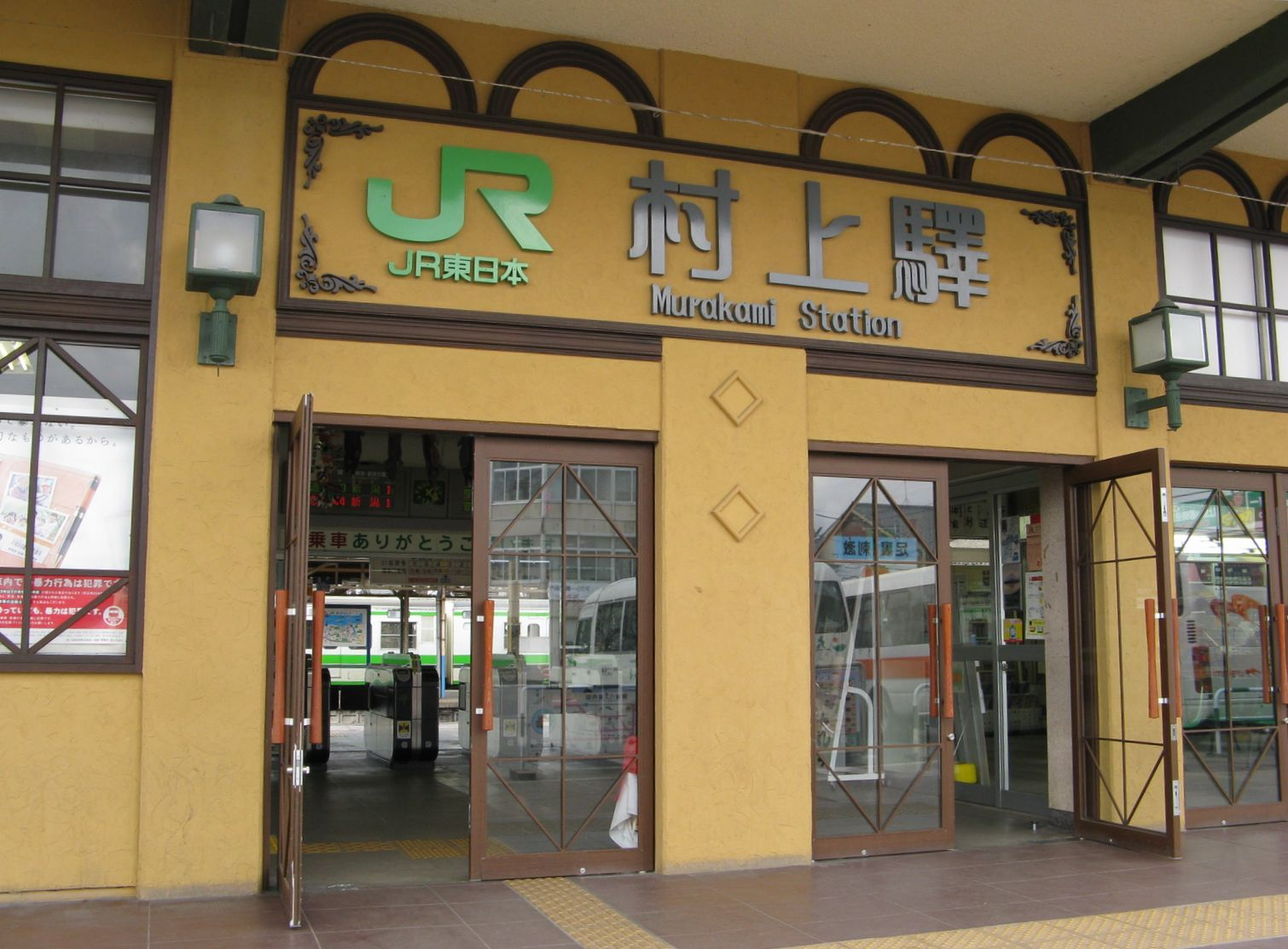
Murakami Station entrance

Murakami Station (村上駅, Murakami eki) is a railway station in the city of Murakami, Niigata, Japan, operated by East Japan Railway Company (JR East).

== Lines ==
Murakami Station is served by the Uetsu Main Line, and is 59.4 kilometers from the starting point of the line at Niitsu Station.

== Station layout ==
The station consists of one side platform and one island platform connected by a footbridge. The station has a Midori no Madoguchi staffed ticket office.

=== Platforms ===
1	■ Uetsu Main Line	for Niigata and Niitsu
2	■ Uetsu Main Line	(starting trains)
3	■ Uetsu Main Line	for Tsuruoka and Sakata

== History ==
Murakami Station opened on 1 November 1914. The station building was rebuilt in 1964. With the privatization of Japanese National Railways (JNR) on 1 April 1987, the station came under the control of JR East.

== Passenger statistics ==
In fiscal 2017, the station was used by an average of 1663 passengers daily (boarding passengers only).

== Surrounding area ==
- National Route 345
- Murakami City Hall
- Murakami Post Office
- Murakami General Hospital
- Senami Onsen
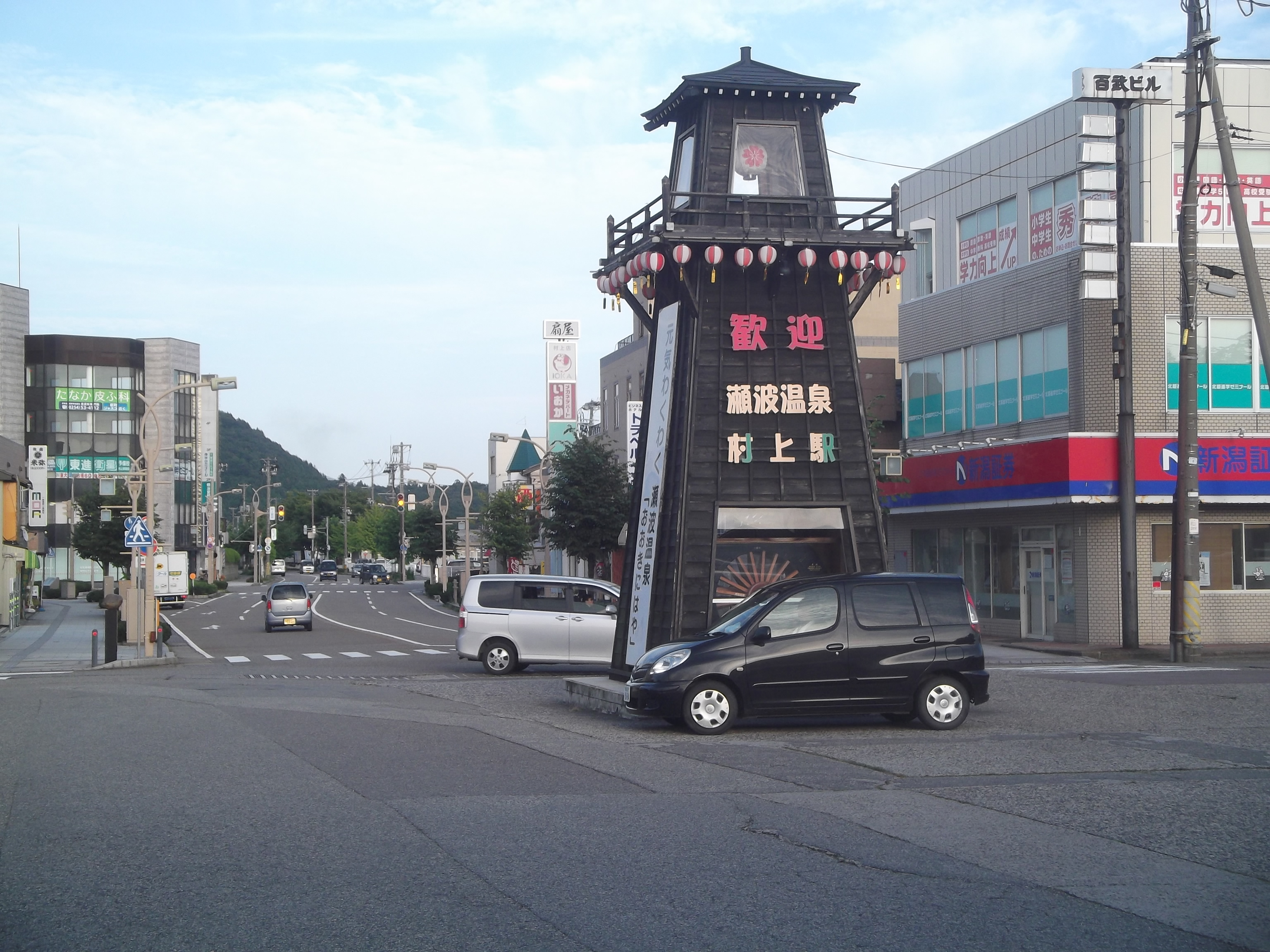
In front of the station

Bus network map of Murakami City

== See also ==
- List of railway stations in Japan
