= Niitsu Station =

Railway station in Niigata, Japan

Niitsu Station 新津駅
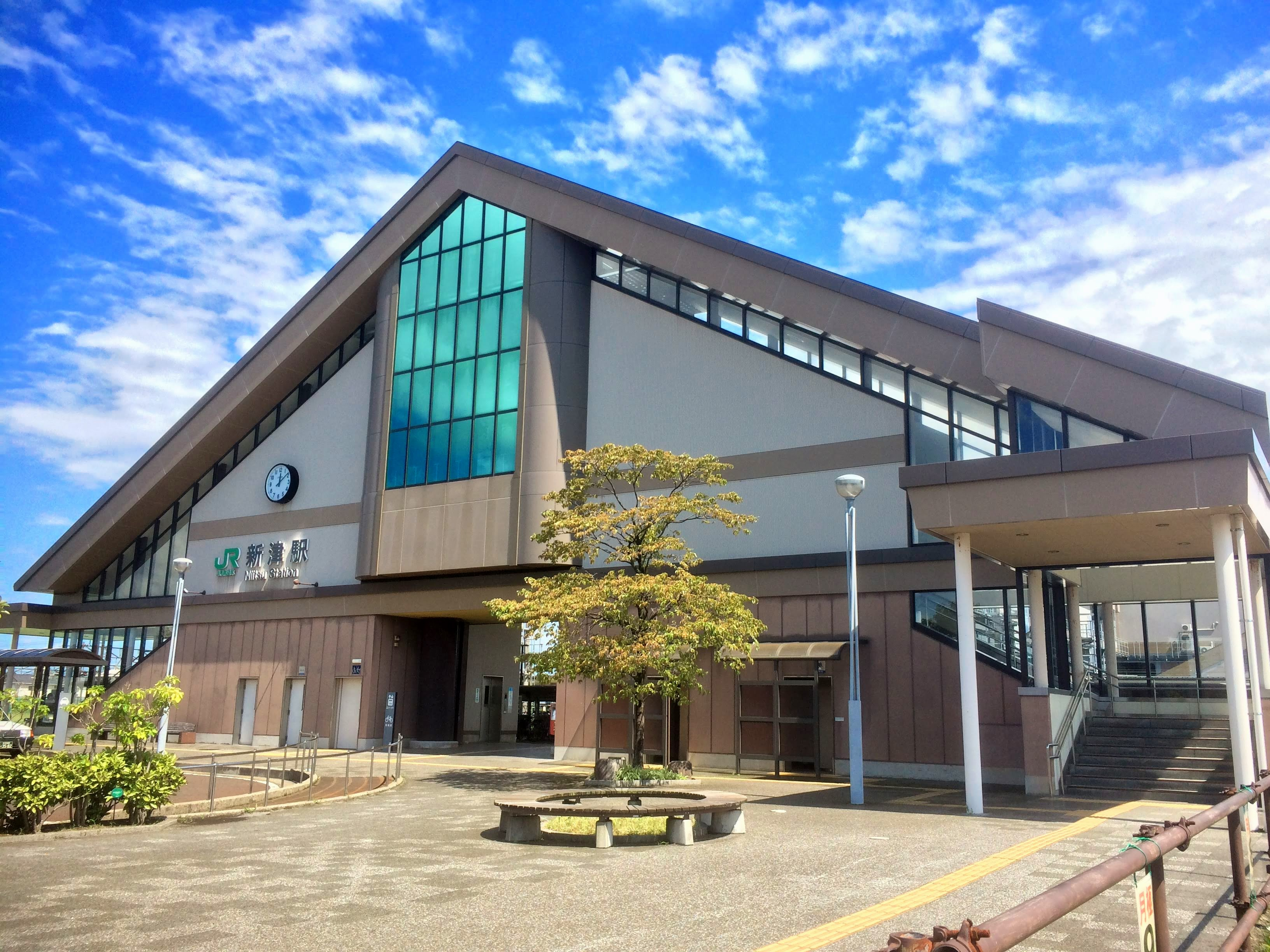
- West side of the station building in September 2018

General information
- Location: 1 Niitsu-honchō, Akiha-ku, Niigata-shi, Niigata-ken 956–0864; Japan
- Coordinates: 37°48′1″N 139°7′17″E
- Operator: JR East
- Lines: ■ Uetsu Main Line; ■ Banetsu West Line; ■ Shinetsu Main Line
- Distance: 175.6 km from Kōriyama.
- Platforms: 1 side + 2 island platforms
- Tracks: 5

Other information
- Status: Staffed
- Website: Official website

History
- Opened: 20 November 1897; 128 years ago

Passengers
- FY2017: 4,341 daily

Services
Preceding station	JR East	Following station
Kamo towards Naoetsu	Shirayuki	Niigata Terminus
Yashiroda towards Naoetsu	Shin'etsu Main Line Rapid	Kameda towards Niigata
Furutsu towards Naoetsu	Shin'etsu Main Line Local	Satsukino towards Niigata
Terminus	Ban'etsu West Line Rapid Agano	Gosen towards Aizu-Wakamatsu
Terminus	Ban'etsu West Line Local	Higashi-Niitsu towards Kōriyama
Terminus	Uetsu Main Line	Kyōgase towards Akita
Location
- Location within JR Shinetsu Main Line Location within Japan

Niitsu Station (新津駅, Niitsu-eki) is a railway station in Akiha-ku, Niigata, Japan, operated by East Japan Railway Company (JR East).

== Lines ==
Niitsu Station is served by the following three lines.

- ■ Uetsu Main Line
- ■ Banetsu West Line
- ■ Shinetsu Main Line

It is the terminus of the Uetsu Main Line and the Banetsu West Line. It is also served by the Shinetsu Main Line, and is located 175.6 kilometers from the starting point of that line at Kōriyama.

== Station layout ==
Niitsu Station has one side platform (1) and two island platforms (2/3, 4/5) connected by a footbridge. The platforms are not assigned to any particular line or service, but are used in common by all three lines serving the station.

Platform No	Line Name	Direction	Notes
1 - 5	■ Shin'etsu Main Line	for Nagaoka・Kashiwazaki	
1 - 5	■Shinetsu Main Line (■including Ban'etsu West Line)	for Niigata	
1 - 5	■Uetsu Main Line	for Murakami・Tsuruoka	Excluding track 2
1 - 5	■Ban'etsu West Line	for Kitakata・Aizu Wakamatsu	

== History ==
Niitsu Station opened on 20 November 1897. With the privatization of Japanese National Railways (JNR) on 1 April 1987, the station came under the control of JR East.

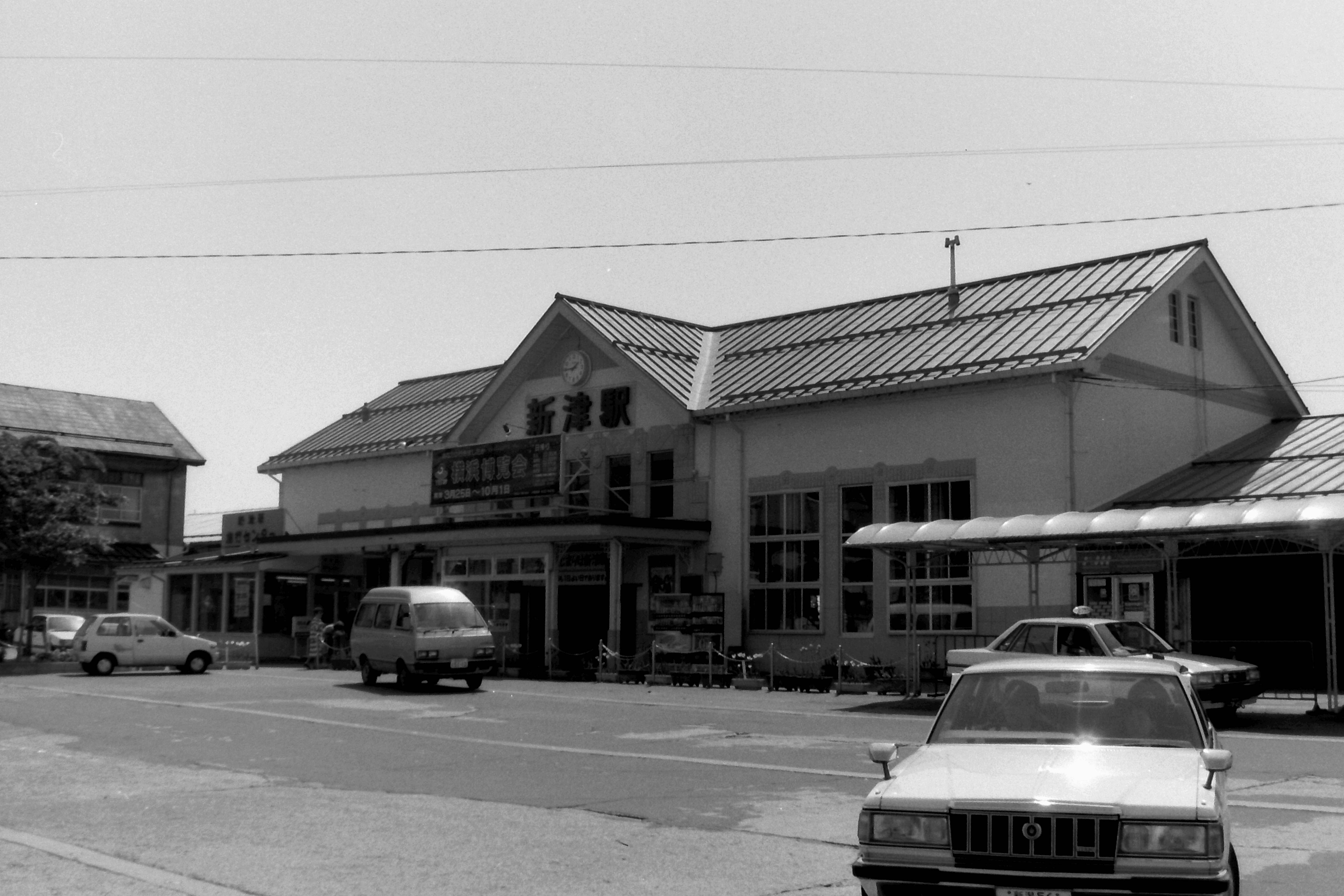
The station forecourt (May 1989)

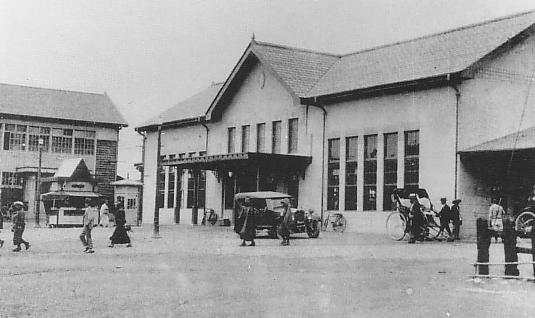
The station forecourt (1928)

== Passenger statistics ==
In fiscal 2017, the station was used by an average of 4,341 passengers daily (boarding passengers only).

== Surrounding area ==
- Niitsu Railway Museum (新津鉄道資料館)
- Japan Transport Engineering Company Niitsu Plant
- Niigata University of Pharmacy and Applied Life Sciences
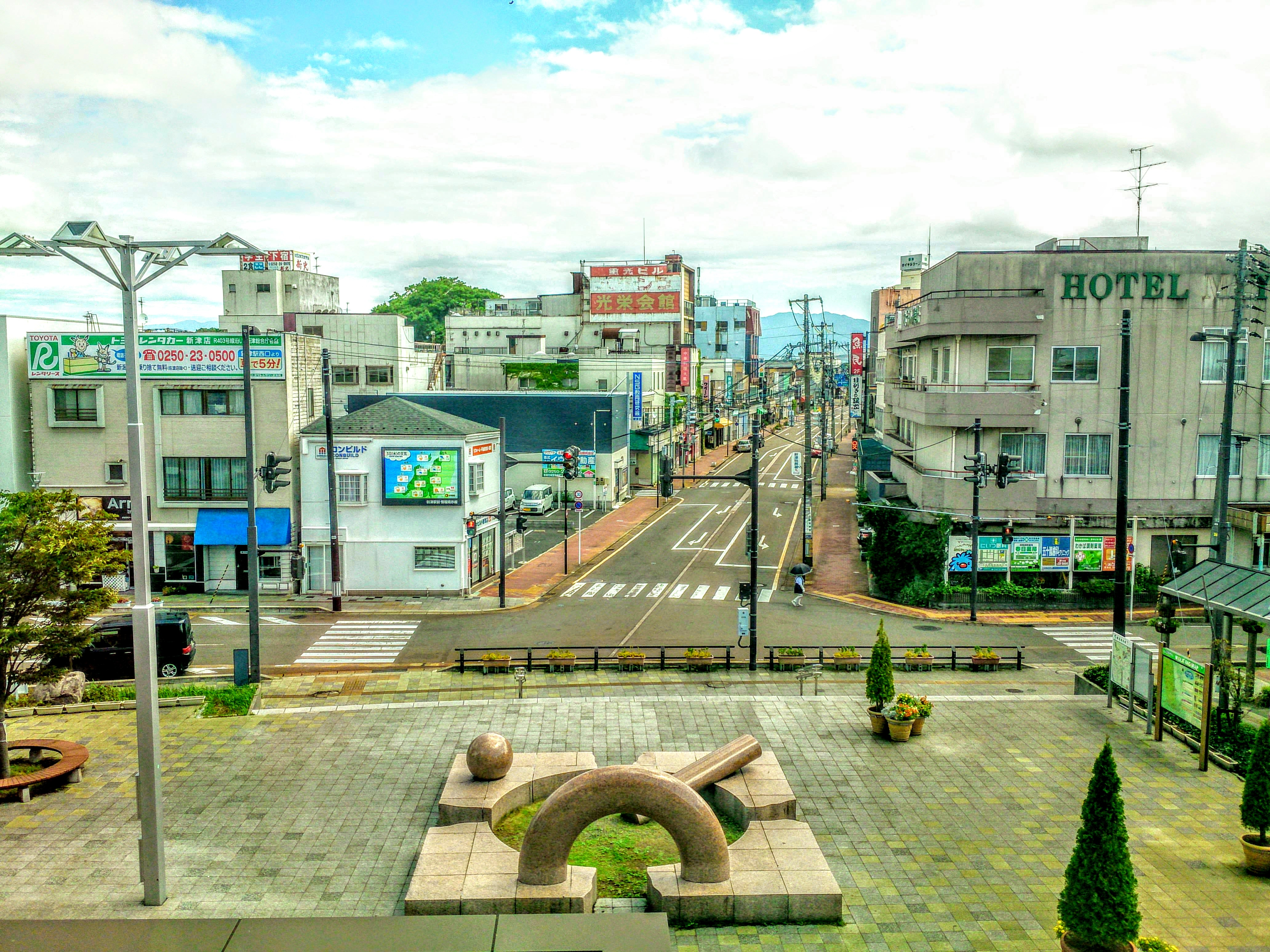
View from east exit

== Gallery ==
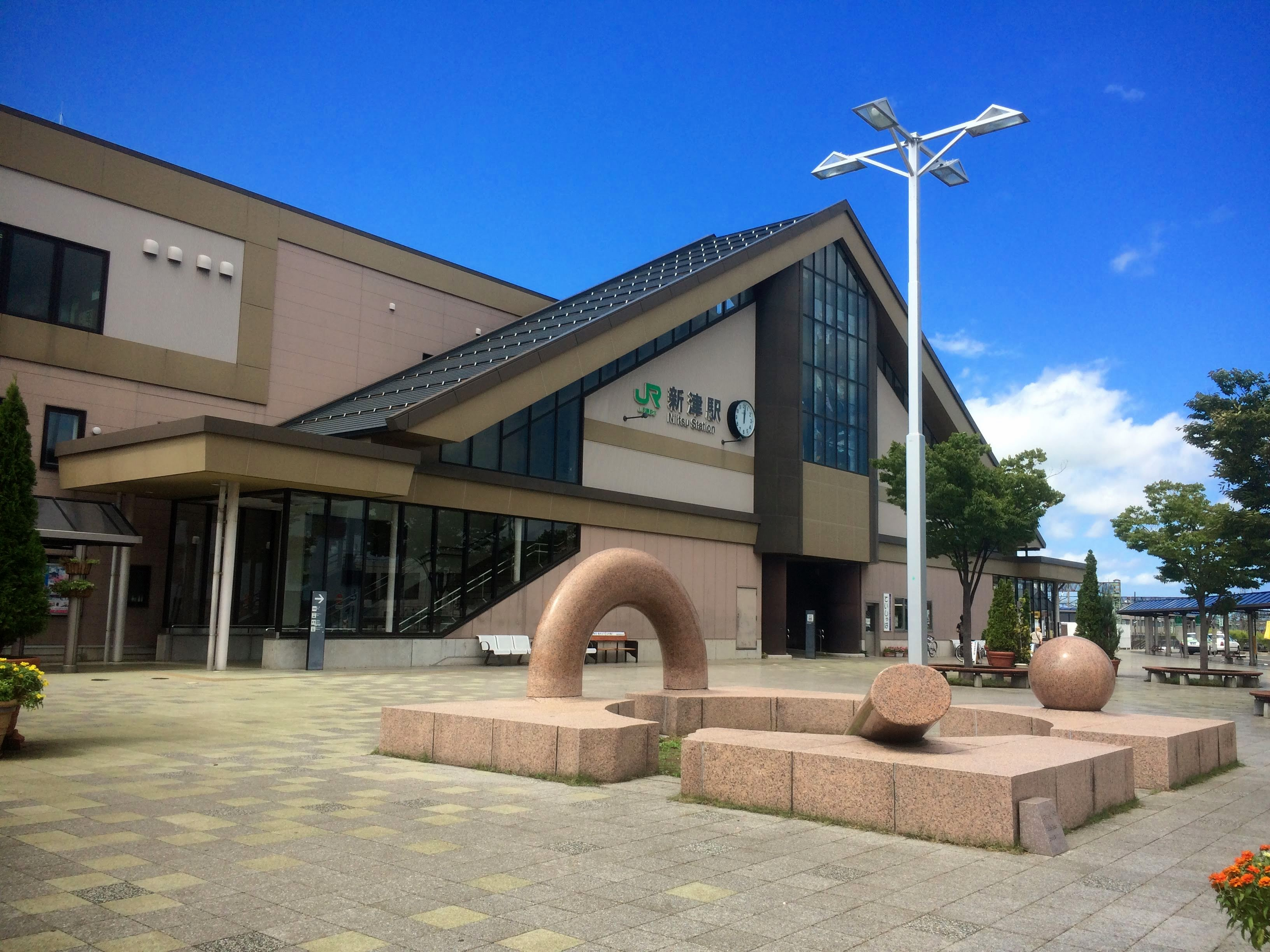
East side

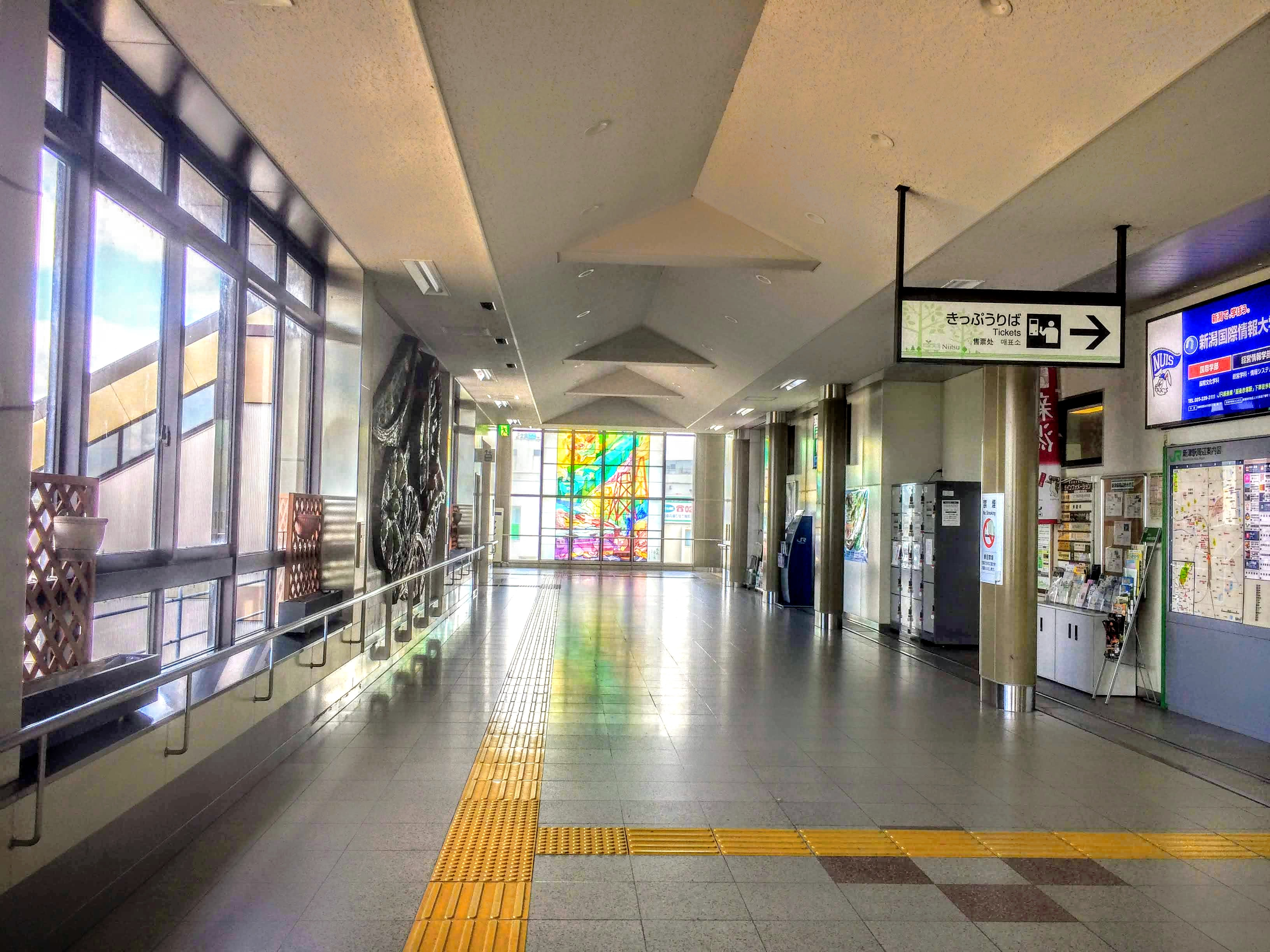
Entrance

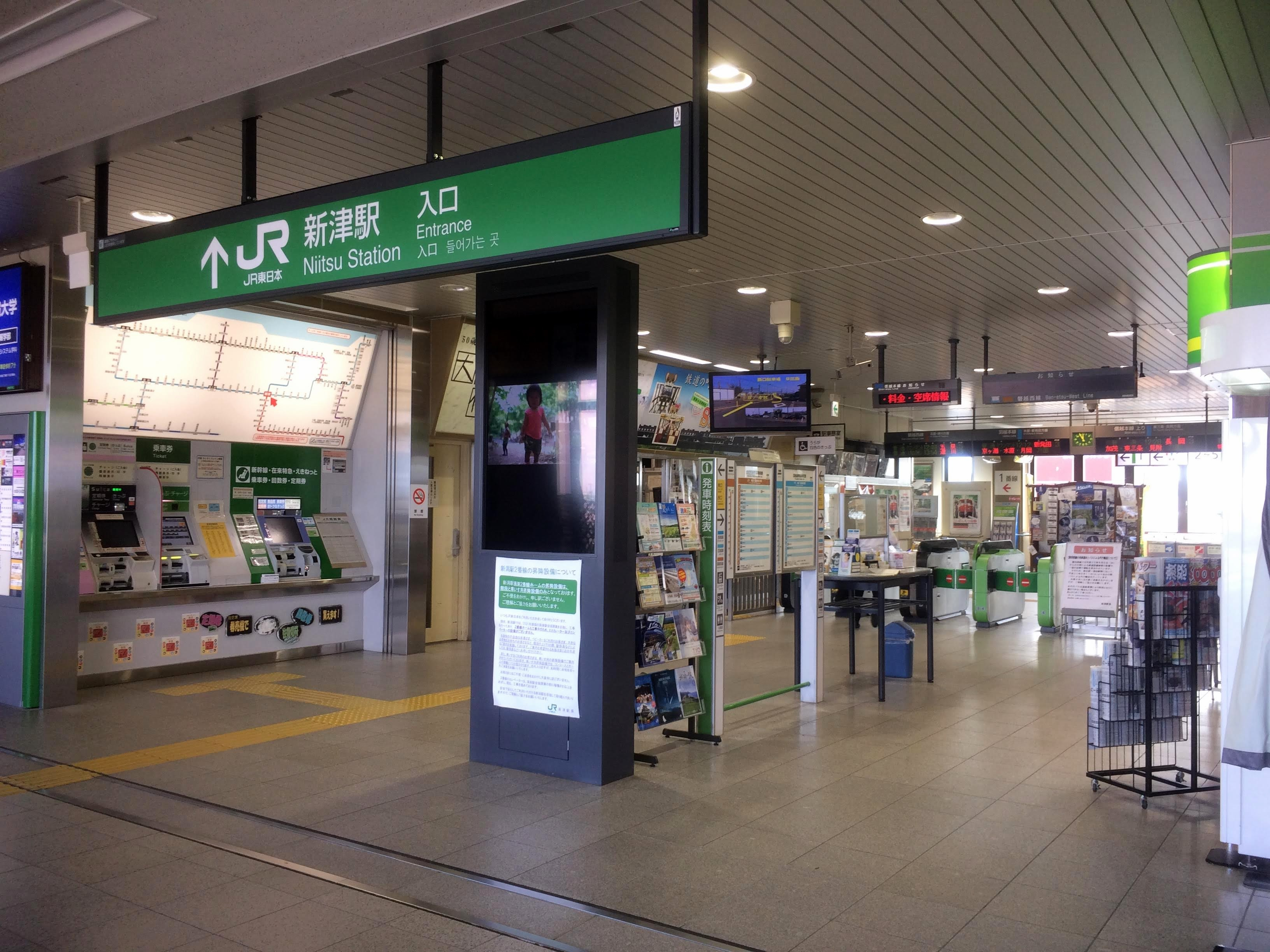
Entrance and ticket machines

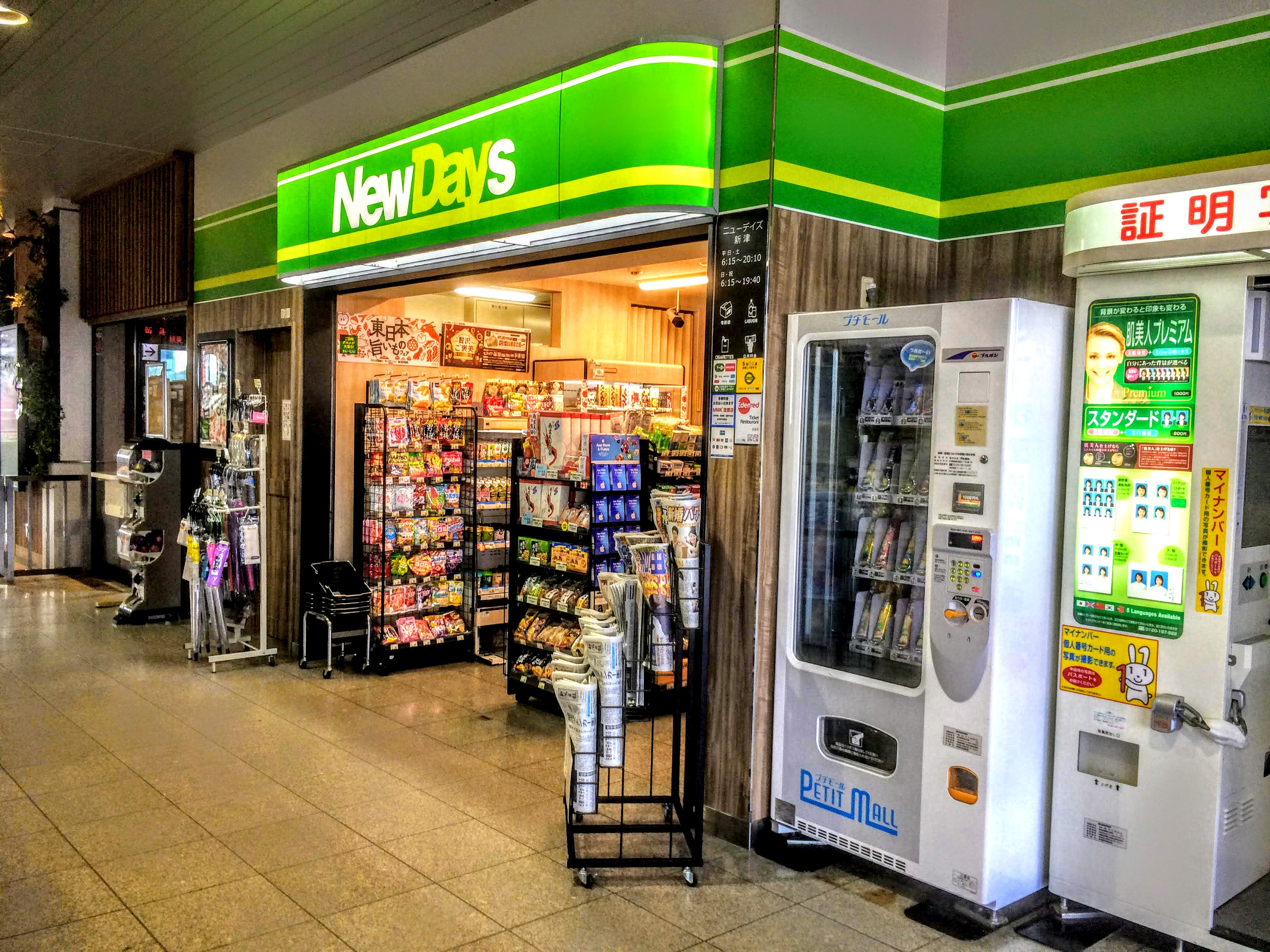
Shop

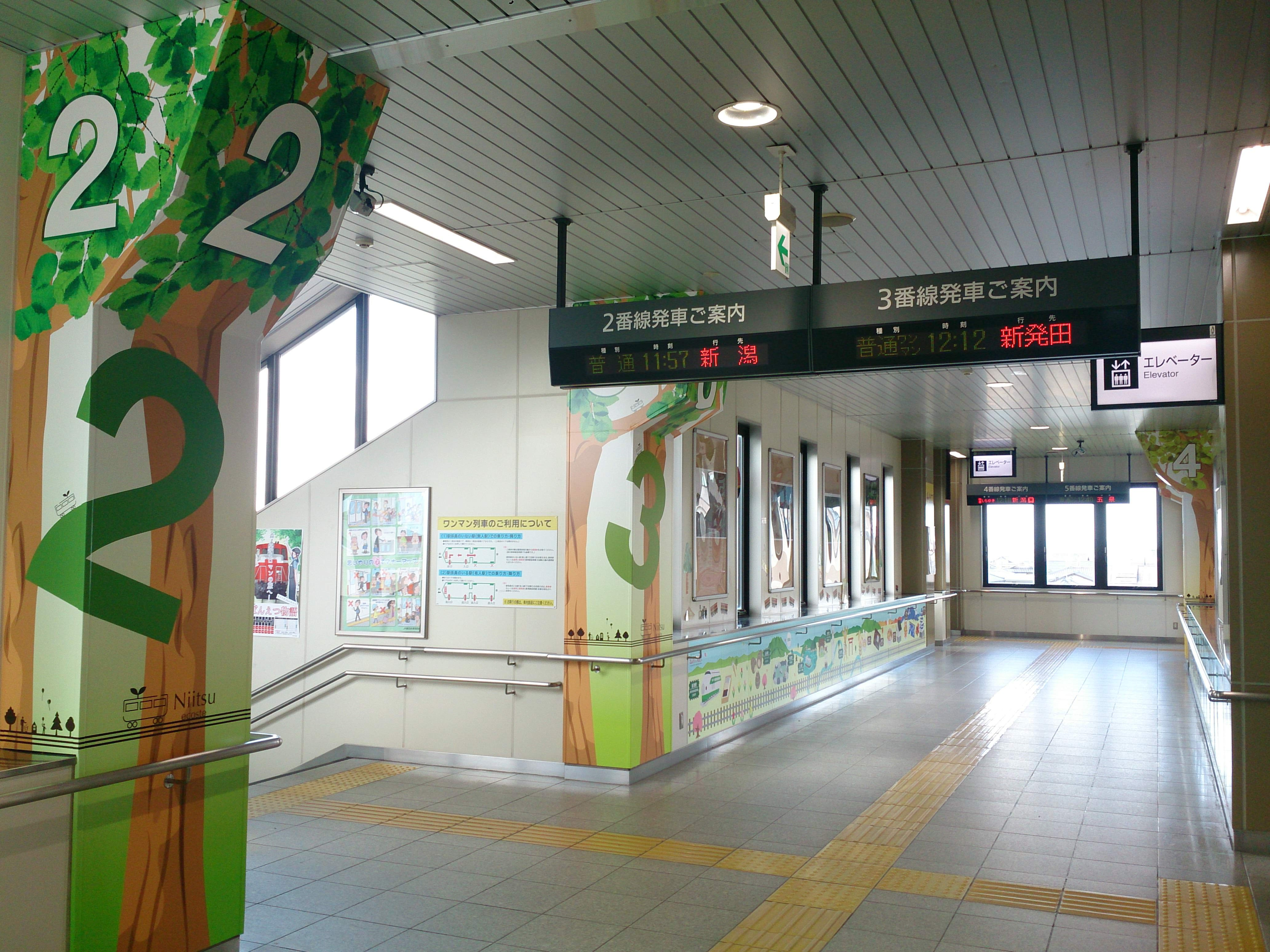
Passway to the platforms

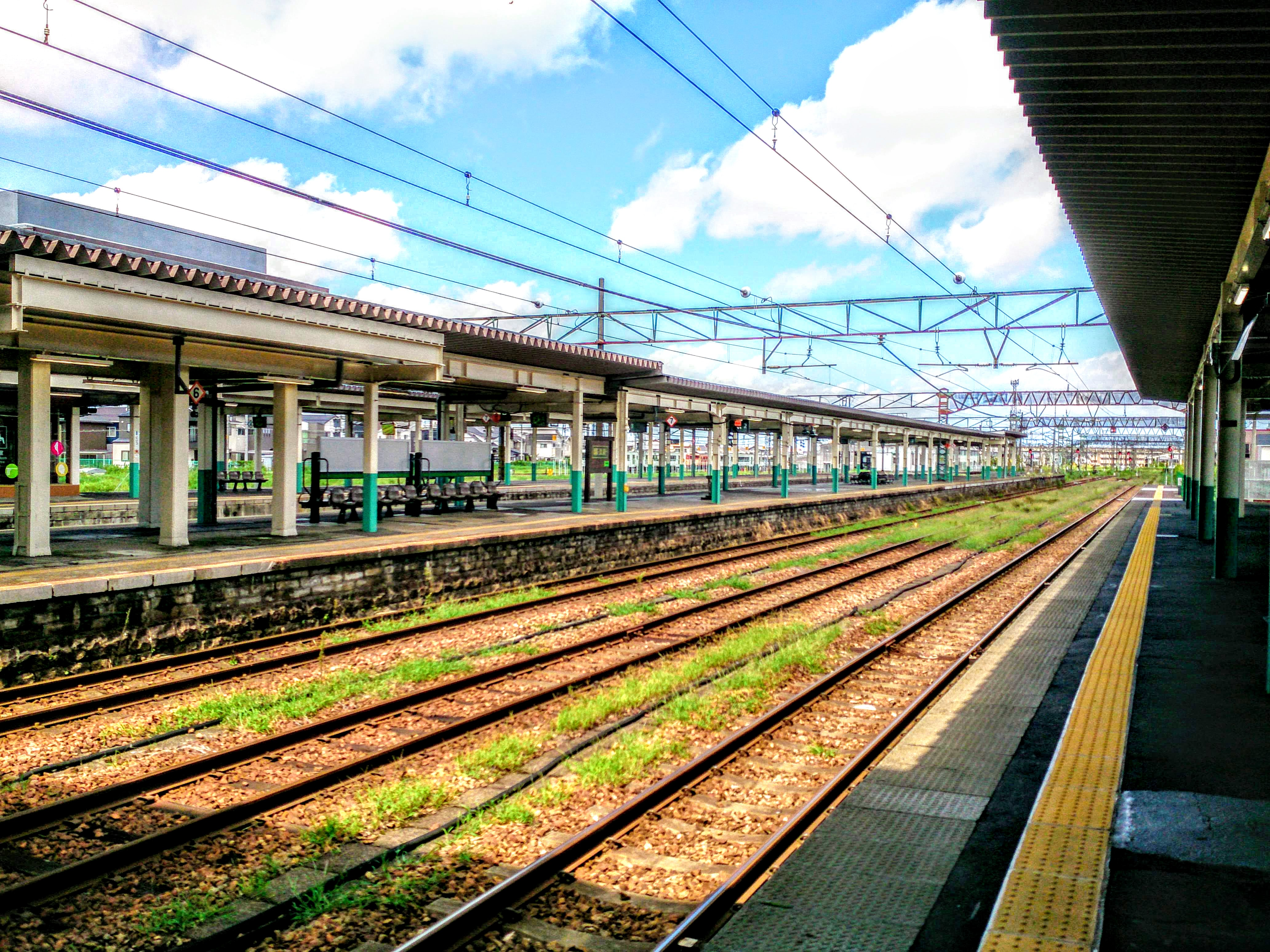
Platforms

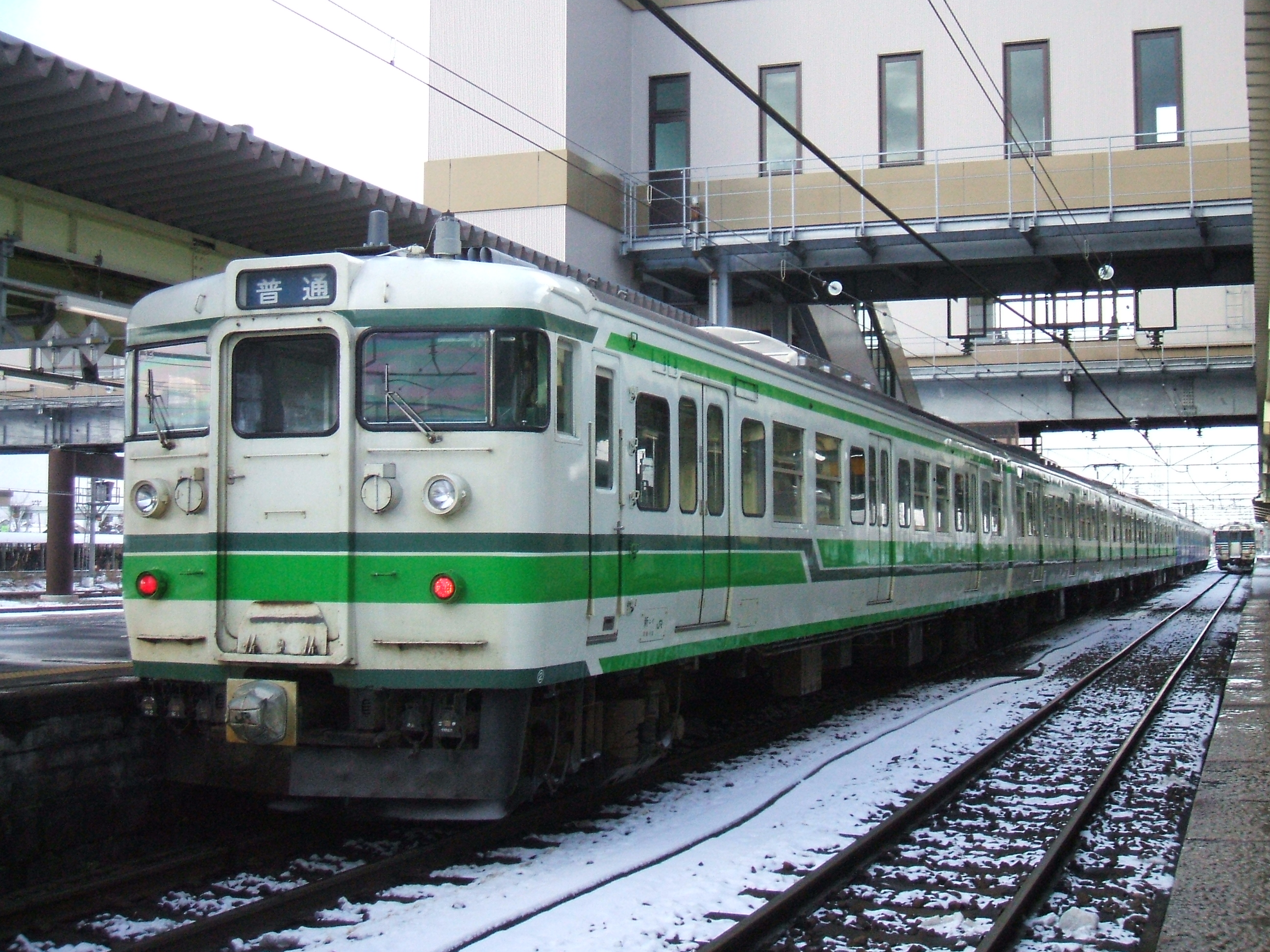
A 115 series EMU at Niitsu Station in January 2008

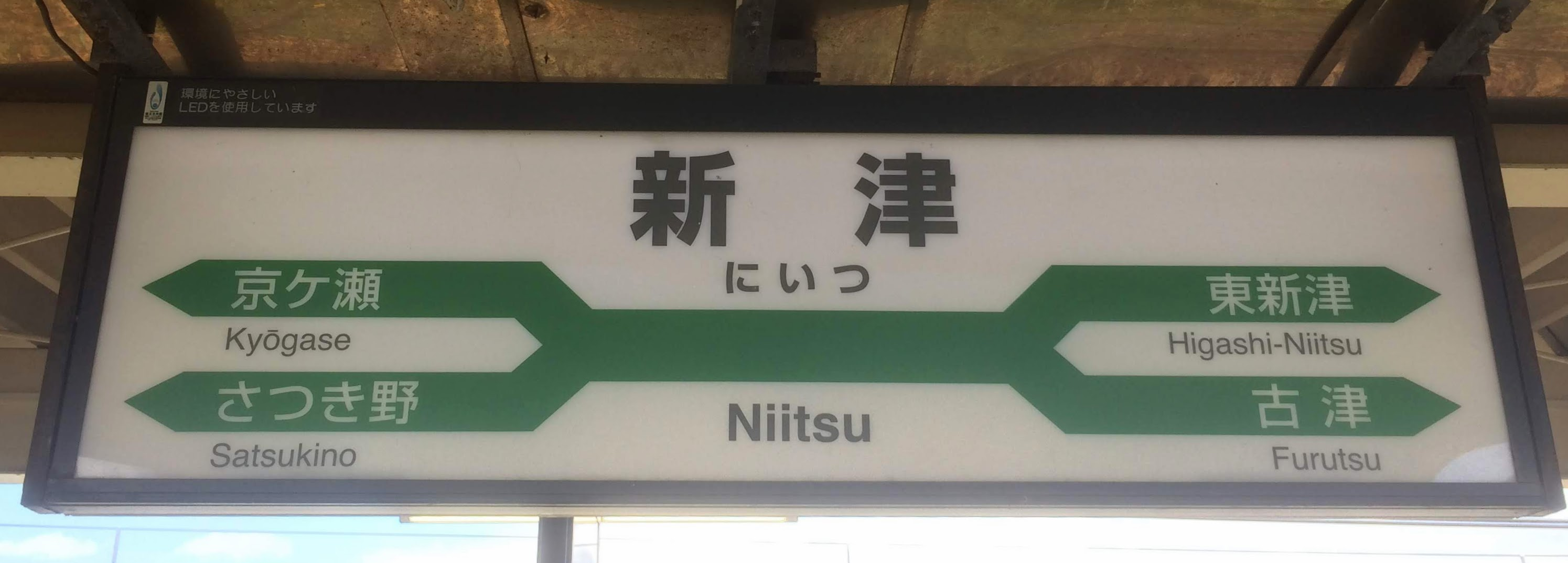
Station name sign

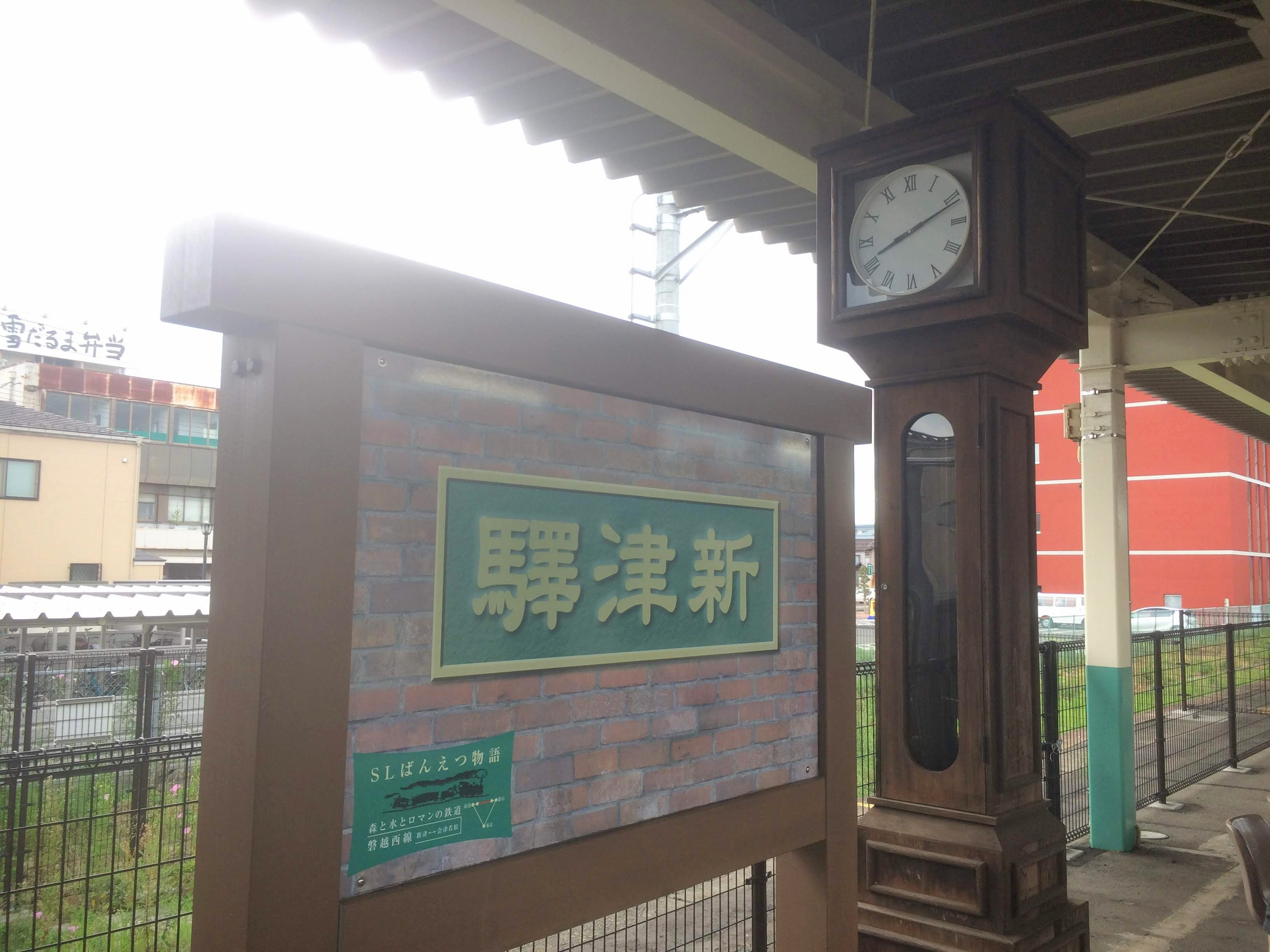
Station name sign in retro style

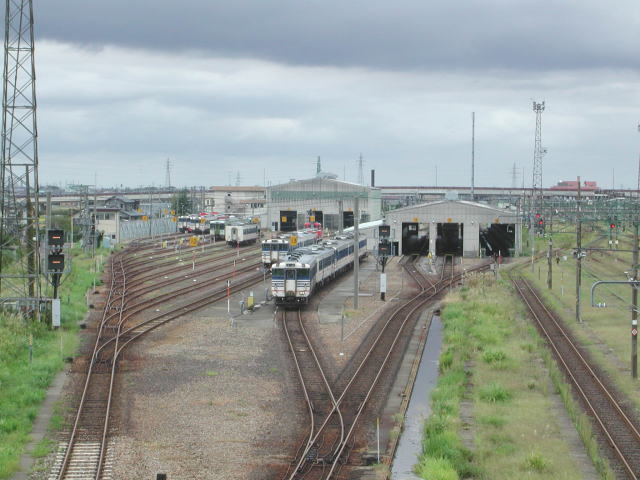
Niitsu Depot

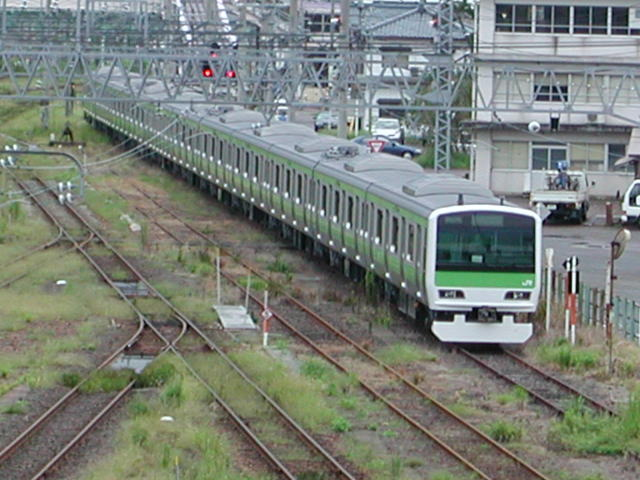
An E231 series EMU built by Niitsu Plant

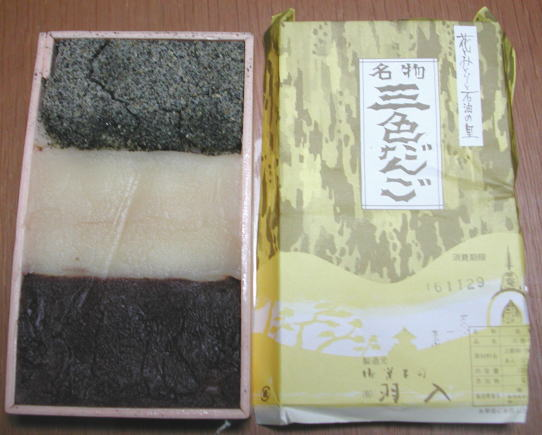
Ekiben "Sanshoku Dango" (Three Colored Dumplings)

== See also ==
- List of railway stations in Japan
