= Kameda =

Kameda may refer to:

== People ==
- Kameda (surname)

== Places ==
- Kameda District, Hokkaidō
- Kameda, Niigata
- Ugo-Kameda Station, Akita Prefecture

== Businesses ==
- Kameda Seika Company Limited of Niigata, Japan, a manufacturer of rice cookies and crackers
