= Ikedaen Station =

Railway station in Nanae, Hokkaido, Japan

Coordinates: 41.9905°N 140.7009°E

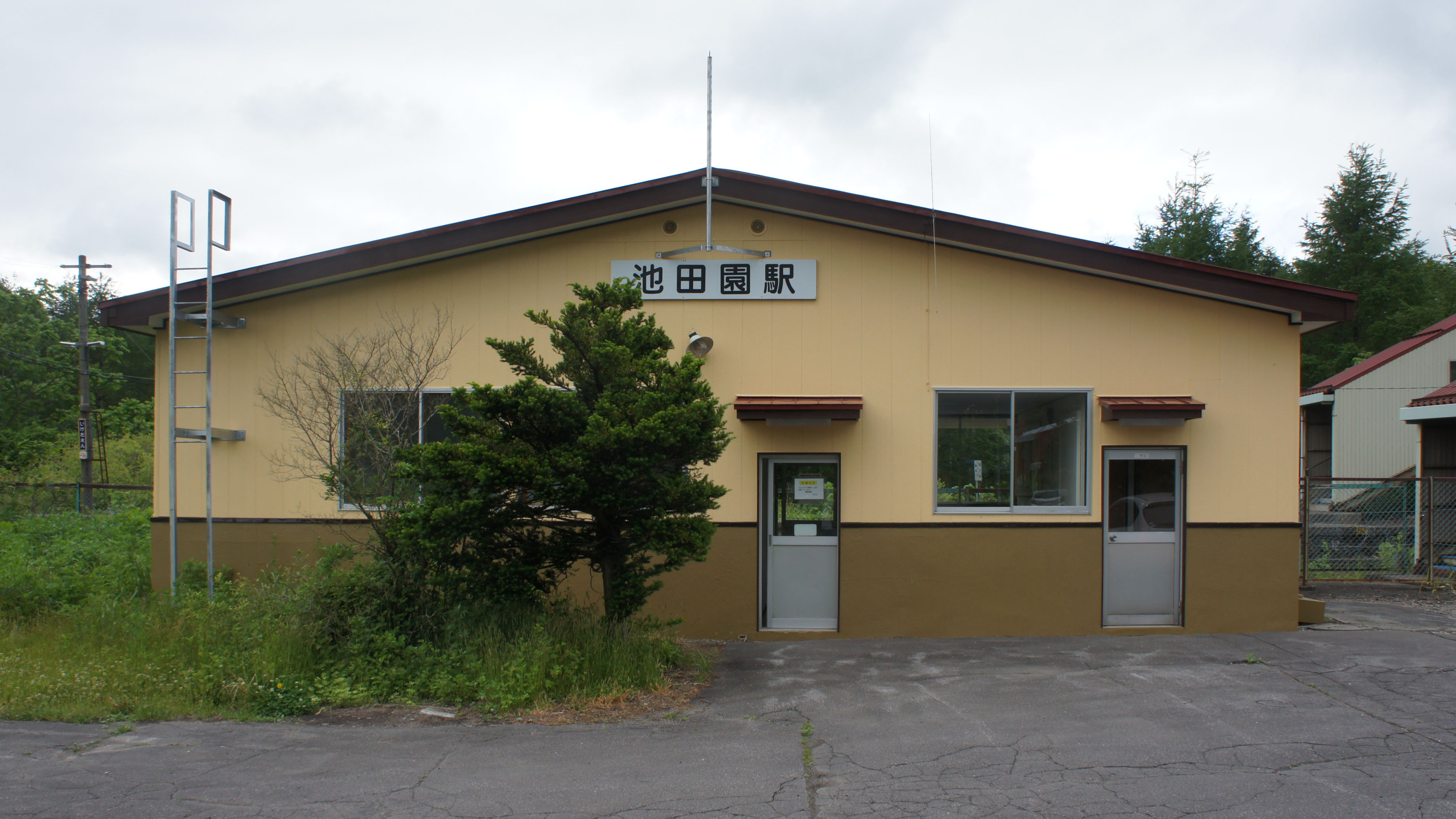
Station building

Ikedaen Station (池田園駅, Ikedaen-eki) was a railway station in Nanae, Kameda District, Hokkaidō, Japan. The station closed on March 12, 2022.

== Lines ==
- Hokkaido Railway Company
  - Hakodate Main Line (Sawara branch line) Station N71

== Adjacent stations ==
«	Service	»
Hakodate Main Line (Sawara branch line)
Ōnuma	-	Nagareyama-Onsen
