= Chōshiguchi Station =

Railway station in Nanae, Hokkaido, Japan

Coordinates: 42.0148°N 140.7205°E

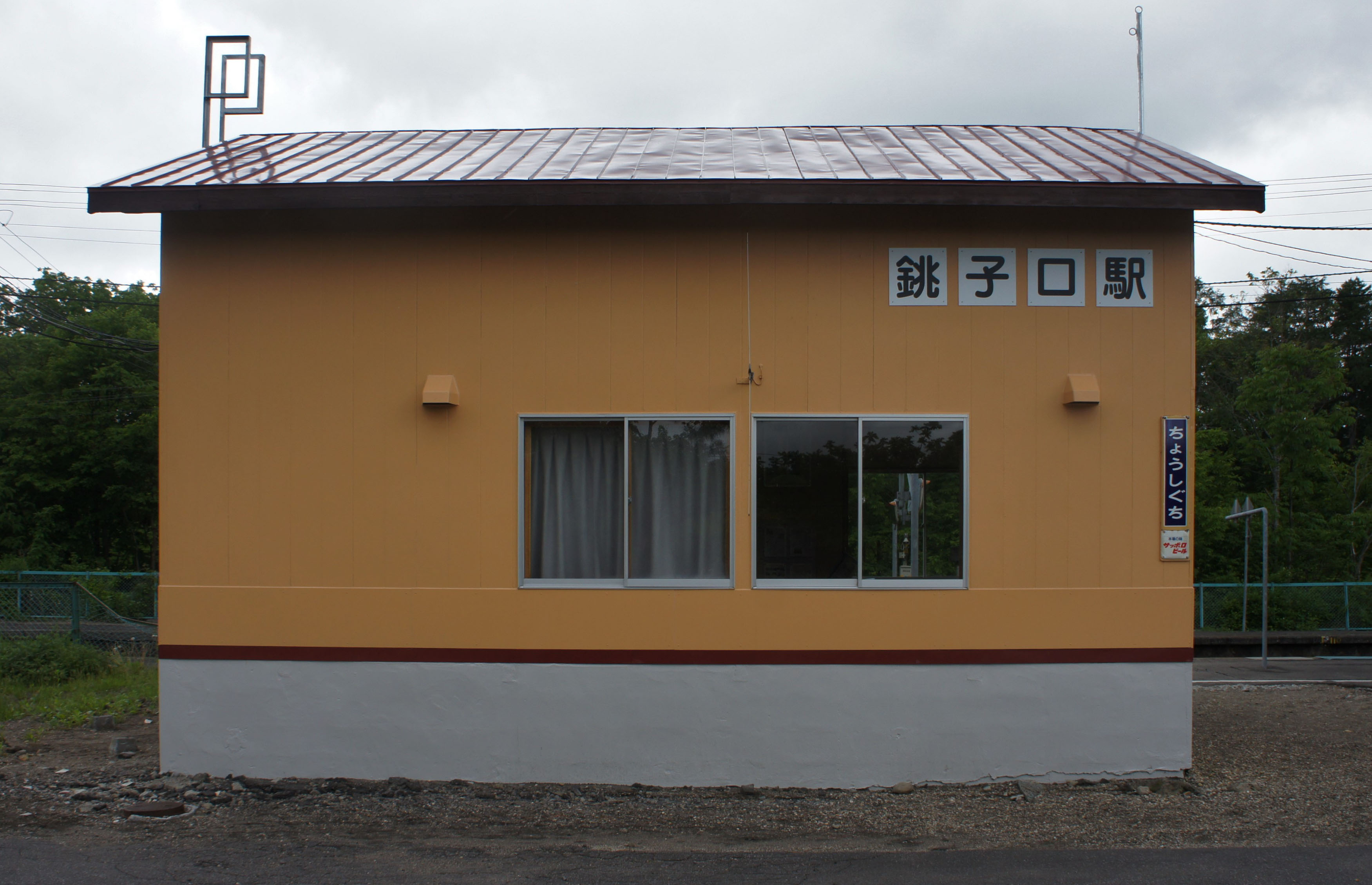
Station building

Chōshiguchi Station (銚子口駅, Chōshiguchi-eki) was a railway station in Nanae, Kameda District, Hokkaidō, Japan. The station closed on March 12, 2022.

== Lines ==
- Hokkaido Railway Company
  - Hakodate Main Line (Sawara branch line) Station N69

== Adjacent stations ==
«	Service	»
Hakodate Main Line (Sawara branch line)
Nagareyama-Onsen	-	Shikabe
