= Ōnakayama Station =

Railway station in Nanae, Hokkaido, Japan

Coordinates: 41°51′53″N 140°42′49″E

H72 Ōnakayama Station 大中山駅
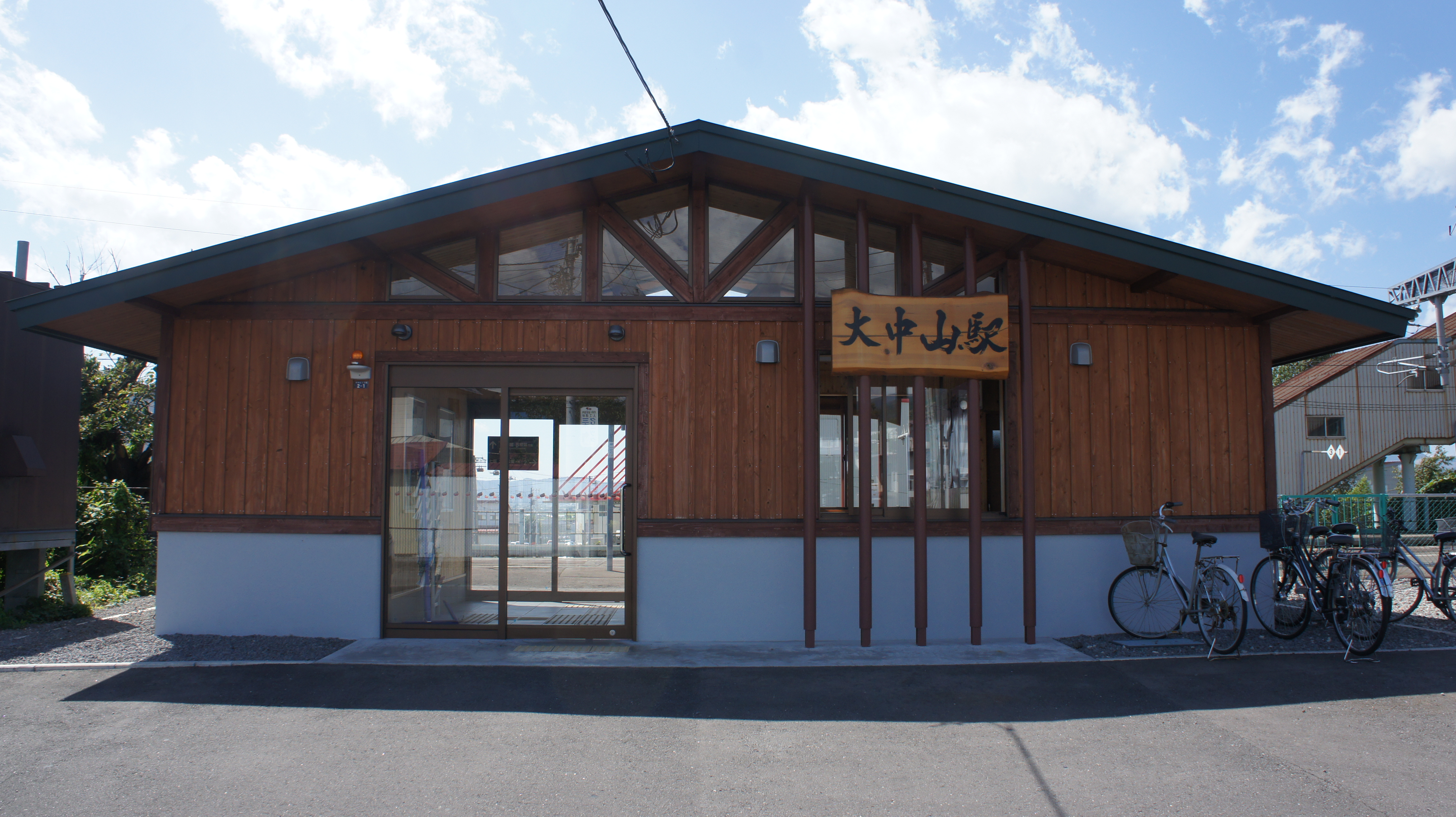
- Station building

General information
- Location: 1-2 Ōnakayama, Nanae, Kameda District; Hokkaido Prefecture; Japan
- Operator: JR Hokkaido
- Line: Hakodate Main Line
- Platforms: 2 side platforms
- Tracks: 2

Other information
- Station code: H72

History
- Opened: 1 December 1946; 79 years ago

Services
Preceding station	JR Hokkaido	Following station
Kikyō towards Hakodate	Hakodate Main Line	Nanae towards Asahikawa

Other services
Preceding station	JR Hokkaido	Following station
Hokuto does not stop here
Location
- Location within Hokkaido Location within Japan

Ōnakayama Station (大中山駅, Ōnakayama-eki) is a railway station in Nanae, Hokkaidō Prefecture, Japan.

== Lines ==
- Hokkaido Railway Company
  - Hakodate Main Line Station H72

== Adjacent stations ==
«	Service	»
Hakodate Main Line
Kikyō	Local	Nanae
