= Kikyō Station =

Railway station in Hakodate, Hokkaido, Japan

Coordinates: 41°50′48″N 140°43′23″E

H73 Kikyō Station 桔梗駅
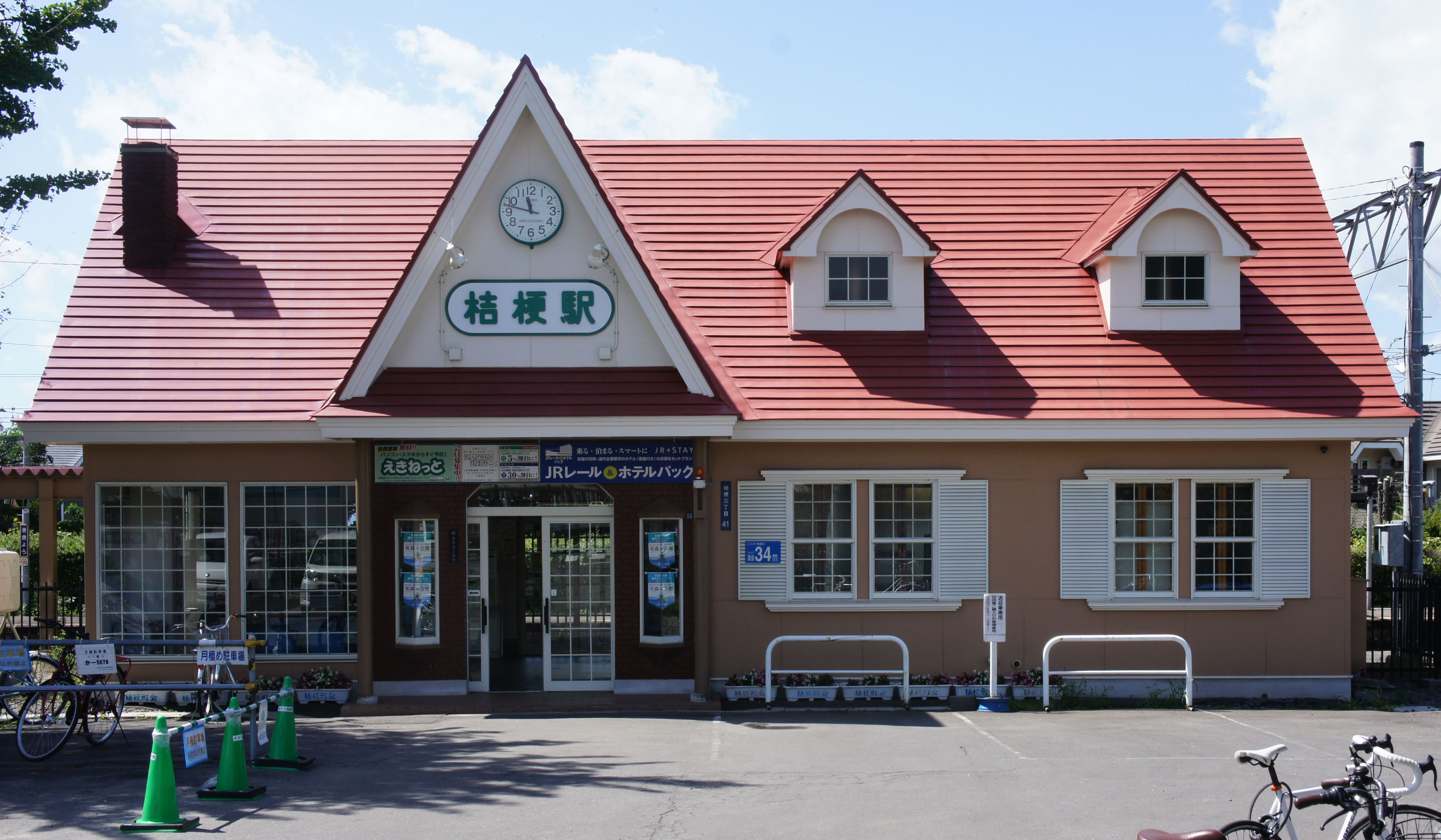
- JR Hakodate-Main-Line, Kikyo Station building

General information
- Location: 3-41-36 Kikyo, Hakodate; Hokkaido Prefecture; Japan
- Operator: JR Hokkaido
- Line: Hakodate Main Line
- Platforms: 2 side platforms
- Tracks: 2

Construction
- Structure type: At grade

Other information
- Station code: H73

History
- Opened: 10 December 1902; 123 years ago

Services
Preceding station	JR Hokkaido	Following station
Goryōkaku towards Hakodate	Hakodate Main Line Local	Ōnakayama towards Asahikawa

Other services
Preceding station	JR Hokkaido	Following station
Hokuto does not stop here
Location
- Location within Hokkaido Location within Japan

Kikyō Station (桔梗駅, Kikyō-eki) is a railway station on the JR Hokkaido Hakodate Main Line. It is located in Hakodate, Hokkaidō, Japan.

== Station structure ==
The station has two platforms serving two tracks.

Platforms

1	■Hakodate Main Line	For Hakodate
2	■Hakodate Main Line	For Nanae

Kikyō Station is administered by Goryōkaku Station and operated by JR Hakodate Development Co., Ltd. Ordinary tickets, express tickets, and reserved-seat tickets for all JR lines are on sale.

- Business hours: 7:10 a.m. - 4:30 p.m. (closed on holidays)
