= Michikawa Station =

Railway station in Yurihonjō, Akita Prefecture, Japan

Michikawa Station 道川駅
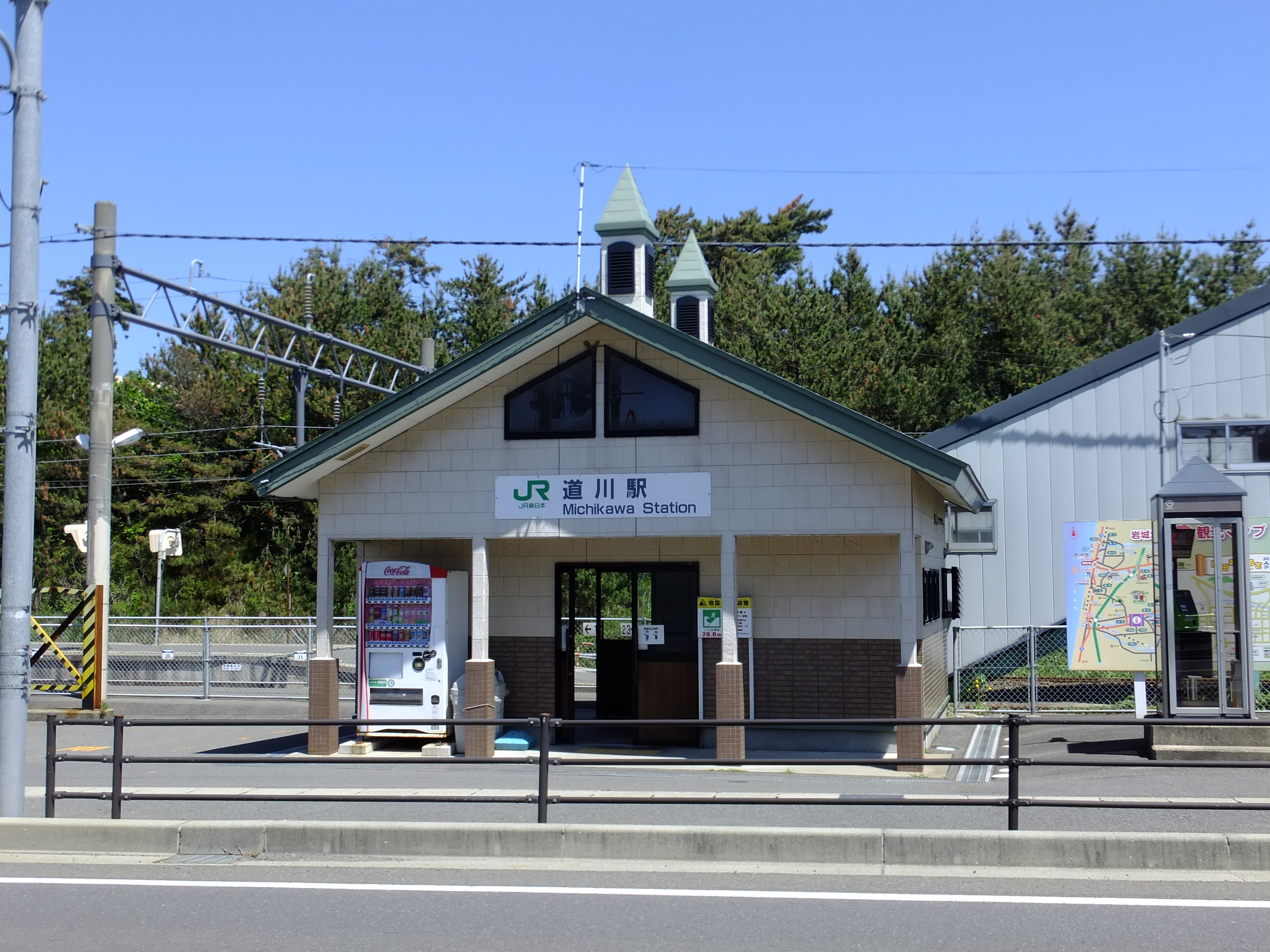
- Michikawa Station, May 2015

General information
- Location: Idonosawa, Iwaki-Uchimichikawa, Yurihonjō-shi, Akita-ken; Japan
- Coordinates: 39°33′36.6″N 140°3′24.7″E
- Operator: JR East
- Line: ■ Uetsu Main Line
- Distance: 251.8 kilometers from Niitsu
- Platforms: 1 side + 1 island platform

Other information
- Status: Unstaffed
- Website: Official website

History
- Opened: February 22, 1922

Services
Preceding station	JR East	Following station
Iwaki-Minato towards Niitsu	Uetsu Main Line	Shimohama towards Akita
Location
- Location within Akita Prefecture Location within Japan

Michikawa Station (道川駅, Michikawa-eki) is a railway station in the city of Yurihonjō, Akita Prefecture, Japan, operated by JR East.

== Lines ==
Michikawa Station is served by the Uetsu Main Line, and is located 251.8 kilometres (156.5 mi) from the terminus of the line at Niitsu Station.

== Station layout ==
The station has one side platform and one island platform connected to the station building by a footbridge. The station is unattended.

=== Platforms ===
1	■ Uetsu Main Line	for Araya and Akita
2	■ Uetsu Main Line	passing track
3	■ Uetsu Main Line	for Ugo-Honjō and Sakata

== History ==
Michikawa Station opened on February 22, 1922, as a station on the Japanese Government Railways (JGR) Rikuusai Line, serving the village of Michikawa, Akita. It was switched to the control of the JGR Uetsu Main Line on April 20, 1924. The JGR became the JNR (Japan National Railway) after World War II. With the privatization of the JNR on April 1, 1987, the station came under the control of the East Japan Railway Company.

== Surrounding area ==
- National Route 7
- Site of Iwaki Castle

== See also ==
- List of railway stations in Japan
