= College of Arts and Crafts =

College of Arts and Crafts may refer to:

- Akita Municipal Junior College of Arts and Crafts, Akita, Japan.
- California College of the Arts, Oakland, California, USA and San Francisco, California, USA.
- Camberwell College of Arts, London, United Kingdom.
- College of Arts and Crafts, Lucknow, Lucknow, Uttar Pradesh, India.
- College of Arts and Crafts, Patna, Patna, Bihar, India.
- Faculty of Arts and Architecture, University of Brighton, United Kingdom.
- Gaelic College of Celtic Arts and Crafts, St. Ann's, Nova Scotia's Cape Breton Island, Canada.
- Government College of Fine Arts, Chennai, Chennai, Tamil Nadu, India.
- Konstfack, University College of Arts, Crafts and Design, Stockholm, Sweden.
- Oregon College of Art & Craft, Portland, Oregon, United States.
