= Akita University of Art =

Japanese University

Coordinates: 39°41′11.40″N 140°5′26.96″E

- 秋田公立美術大学
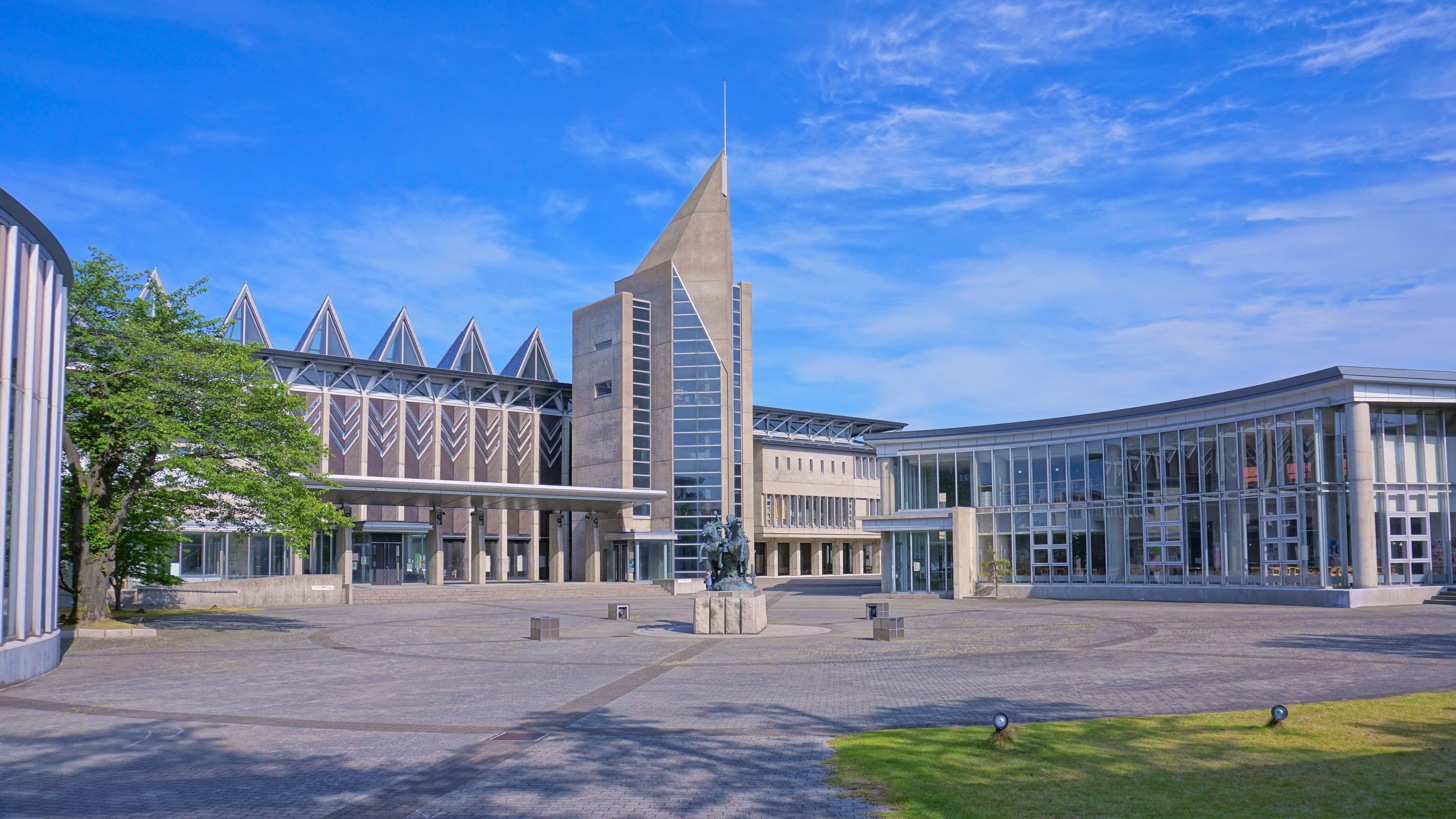
- Type: Public
- Established: 2013
- Location: Akita, Akita Prefecture, Japan
- Website: www.akibi.ac.jp/index.html
- Location within Akita Prefecture Location within Japan

Akita University of Art (秋田公立美術大学, Akita Kōritsu Bijutsu Daigaku) is a public university, located in the city of Akita, Japan.

== History ==
The Akita City School of Crafts was established in June 1952. It was renamed the Akita City School of Arts and Crafts in April 1975. The Akita Municipal Junior College of Arts and Crafts was chartered by the Japanese government as a two-year college in 1995. On April 1, 2013, a four-year college was also chartered by the Japanese government.
