= Niyama Station =

Former railway station in Nanae, Hokkaido, Japan

H69 Niyama Station 仁山駅
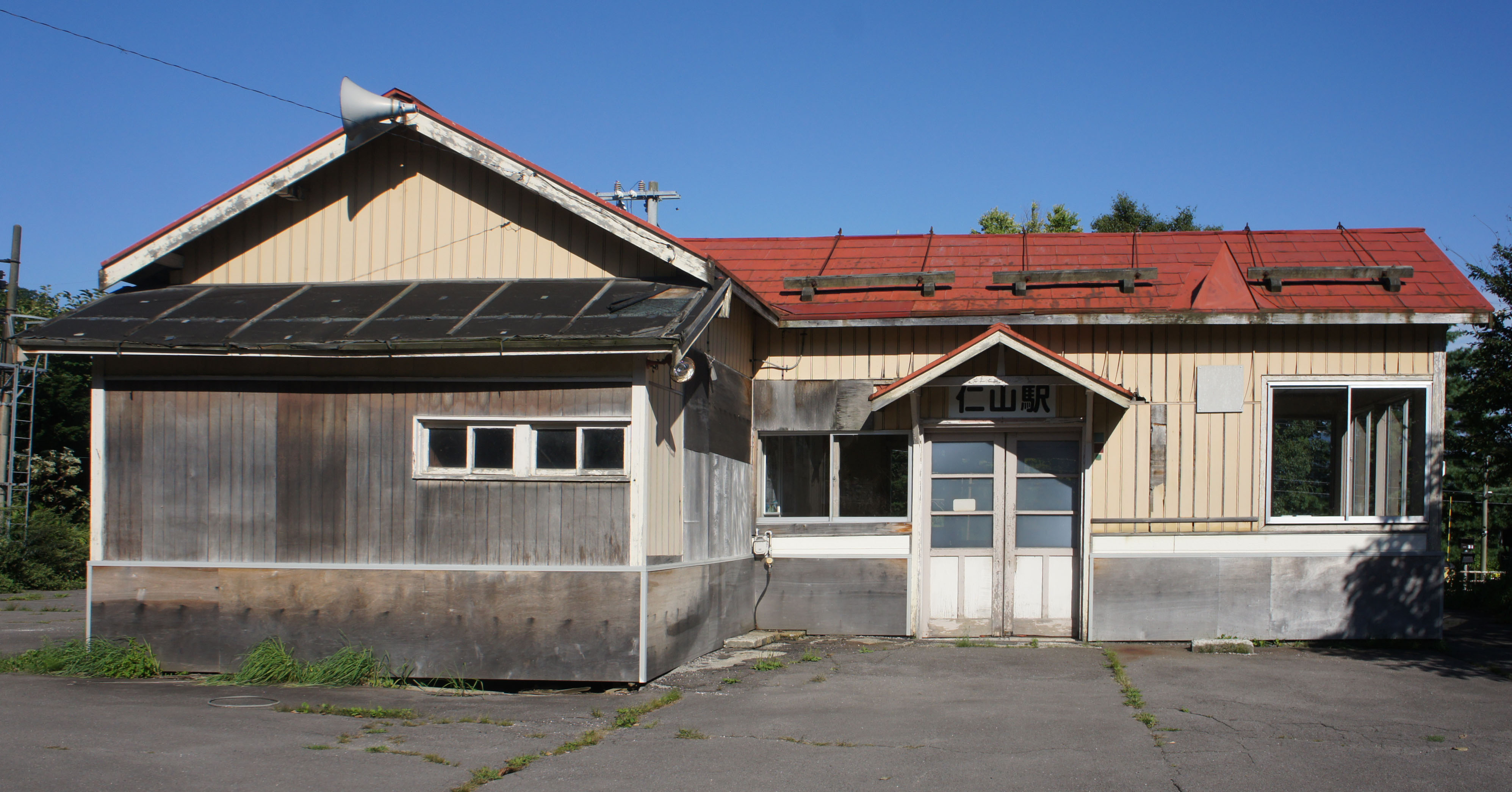
- Niyama Station in August 2017

General information
- Location: Niyama, Nanae, Kameda, Hokkaido （北海道亀田郡七飯町仁山） Japan
- Coordinates: 41°55′48″N 140°38′07″E
- Operator: JR Hokkaido
- Line: Hakodate Main Line
- Connections: Bus stop

History
- Opened: 1943
- Closed: 14 March 2026

Services
Preceding station	JR Hokkaido	Following station
Shin-Hakodate-Hokuto H70 towards Hakodate	Hakodate Main Line	Ōnuma H68 towards Asahikawa
Location

Niyama Station (仁山駅, Niyama-eki) was a railway station in Nanae, Kameda District, Hokkaidō Prefecture, Japan. It was numbered H69.

== Lines ==
Niyama Station was served by the Hakodate Main Line.

== History ==
In June 2023, this station was selected to be among 42 stations on the JR Hokkaido network to be slated for abolition owing to low ridership. The last train served the station on 13 March 2026 and the station was closed the next day.
