= Araya Station (Akita) =

Railway station in Akita, Akita Prefecture, Japan

Araya Station 新屋駅
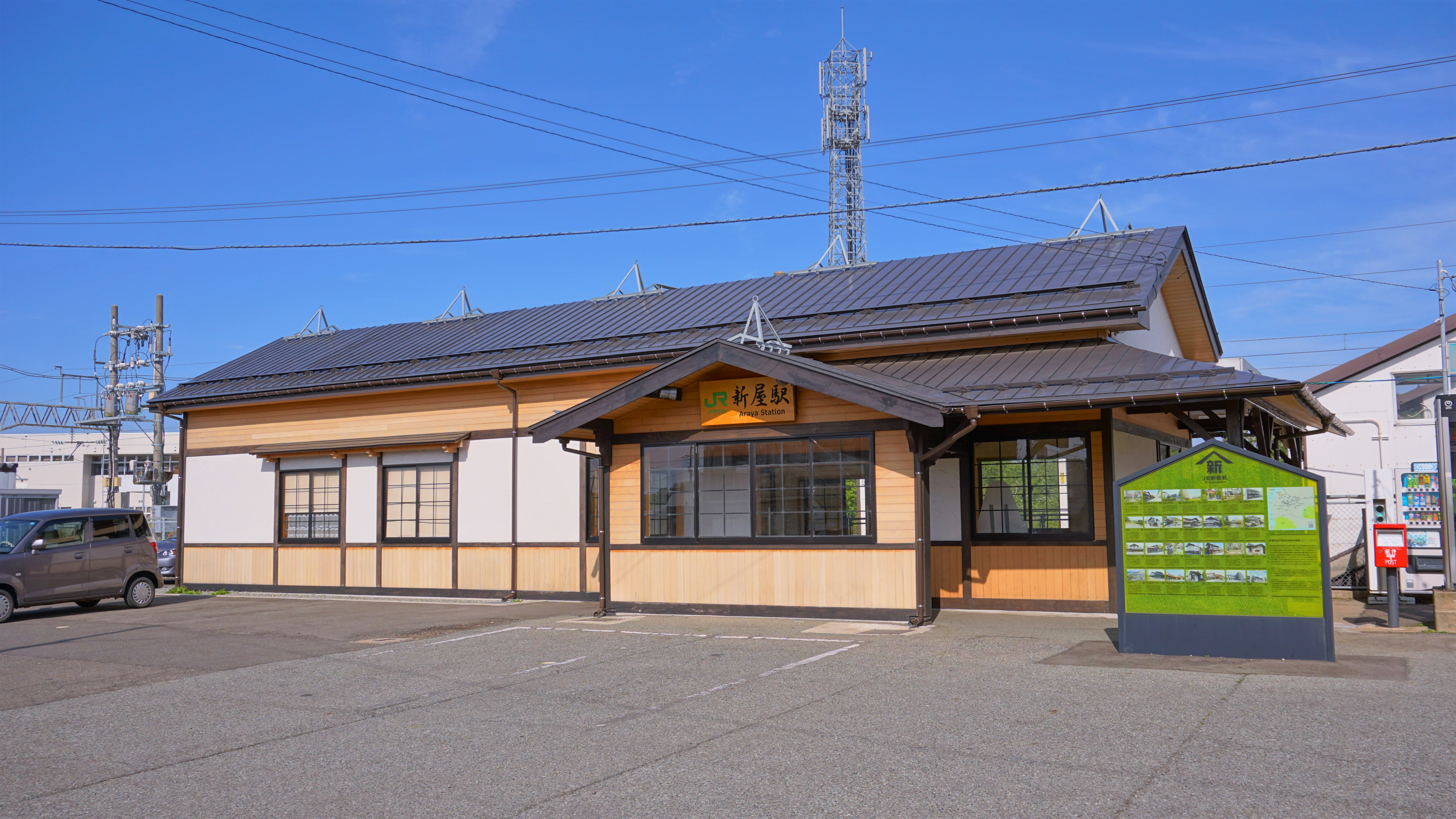
- Araya Station, June 2019

General information
- Location: 9-33 Arayaōgimachi, Akita-shi, Akita-ken, 010-1637; Japan
- Coordinates: 39°40′37.47″N 140°5′14.46″E
- Operator: JR East
- Line: ■ Uetsu Main Line
- Distance: 265.7 kilometers from Niitsu
- Platforms: 1 island platform

Other information
- Status: Staffed (Midori no Madoguchi)
- Website: Official website

History
- Opened: February 22, 1920

Passengers
- FY2018: 921

Services
Preceding station	JR East	Following station
Katsurane towards Niitsu	Uetsu Main Line	Ugo-Ushijima towards Akita
Location
- Location within Akita Prefecture Location within Japan

Araya Station (新屋駅, Araya-eki) is a railway station in the city of Akita, Akita Prefecture, Japan, operated by JR East.

== Lines ==
Araya Station is served by the Uetsu Main Line, and is located 265.7 kilometres (165.1 mi) from the terminus of the line at Niitsu Station.

== Station layout ==
The station has a single island platform connected by a level crossing. The station has a Midori no Madoguchi staffed ticket office.

=== Platforms ===
1	■ Uetsu Main Line	for Akita
2	■ Uetsu Main Line	for Ugo-Honjō and Sakata

== History ==
Araya Station opened on February 22, 1920. With the privatization of JNR on April 1, 1987, the station came under the control of JR East.

== Passenger statistics ==
In fiscal 2018, the station was used by an average of 921 passengers daily (boarding passengers only). The passenger figures for previous years are as shown below.

Fiscal year	Daily average
2000	1,092
2005	1,008
2010	938
2015	878

== Surrounding area ==
- Akita Municipal Junior College of Arts and Crafts
- Akita Prefectural Araya High School
- Akita City West Area Public Hall
- Akita Omoriyama Zoo

== See also ==
- List of railway stations in Japan
