= Ōno, Hokkaido =

Ōno 大野町
- Former town
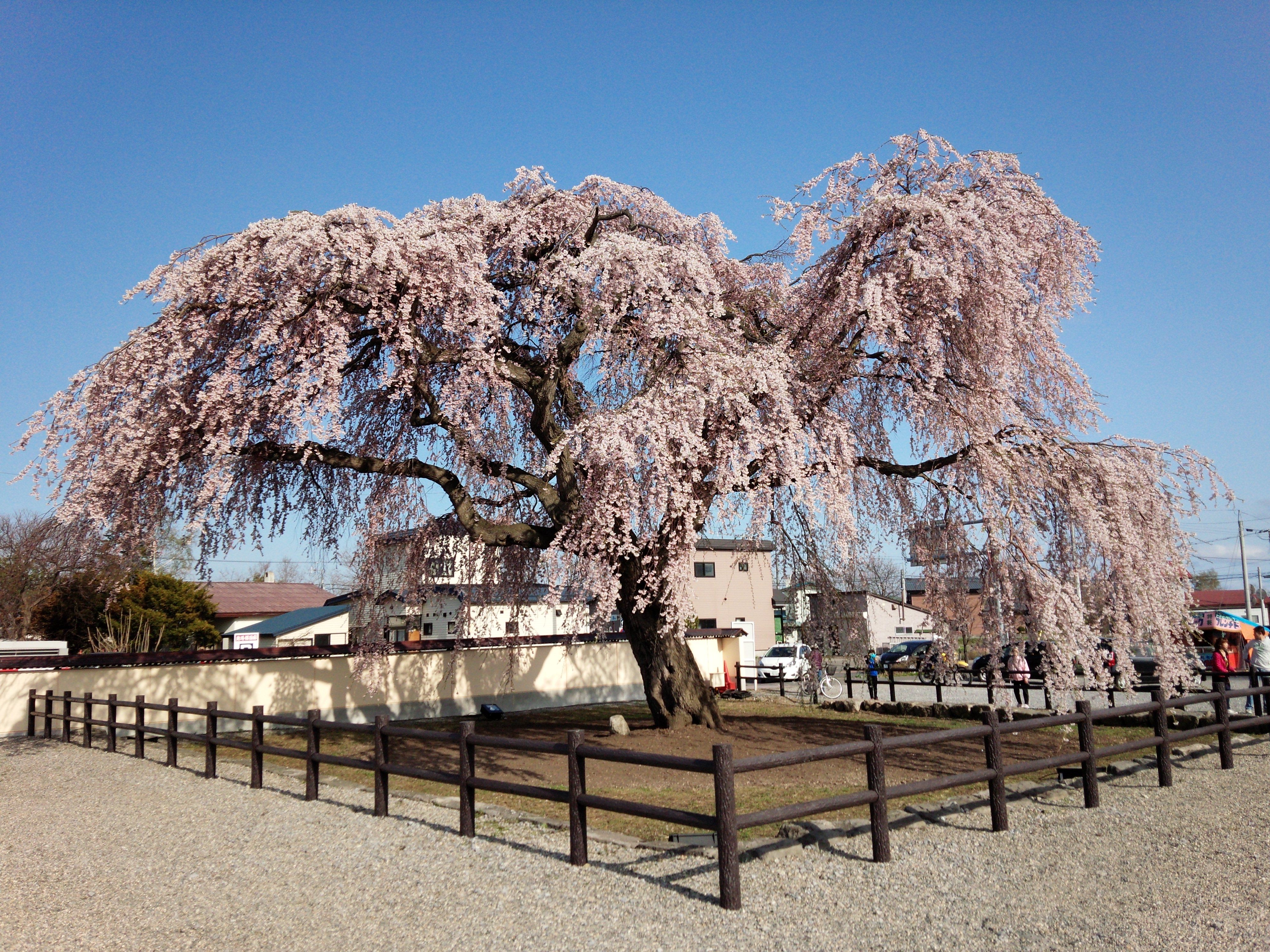
- Hokkameji weeping cherry tree

- Flag Emblem

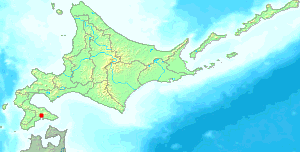
- Location of Ōno in Hokkaido

- Location in Japan
- Coordinates: 41.88347°N 140.64375°E
- Country: Japan
- Region: Hokkaido
- Prefecture: Hokkaido
- District: Kameda
- Merged: February 1, 2006 (now part of Hokuto)

Area
  - Total: 134.88 km^{2} (52.08 sq mi)

Population (end of December 2005)
  - Total: 11,044
  - Density: 81.880/km^{2} (212.07/sq mi)
- Time zone: UTC+09:00 (JST)
- Symbols
- Flower: Rhododendron
- Tree: Taxus cuspidata

Ōno (大野町, Ōno-chō) was a town located in Kameda District, Oshima Subprefecture, Hokkaido, Japan.

As of 2004, the town had an estimated population of 10,826 and a density of 80.26 persons per km^{2}. The total area was 134.88 km^{2}.

On February 1, 2006, Ōno was merged with the town of Kamiiso (from Kamiiso District) to form the new city of Hokuto.
