= Nanae, Hokkaido =

Nanae 七飯町
- Town

Japanese transcription(s)
  - Hepburn romanization: Nanae-chō
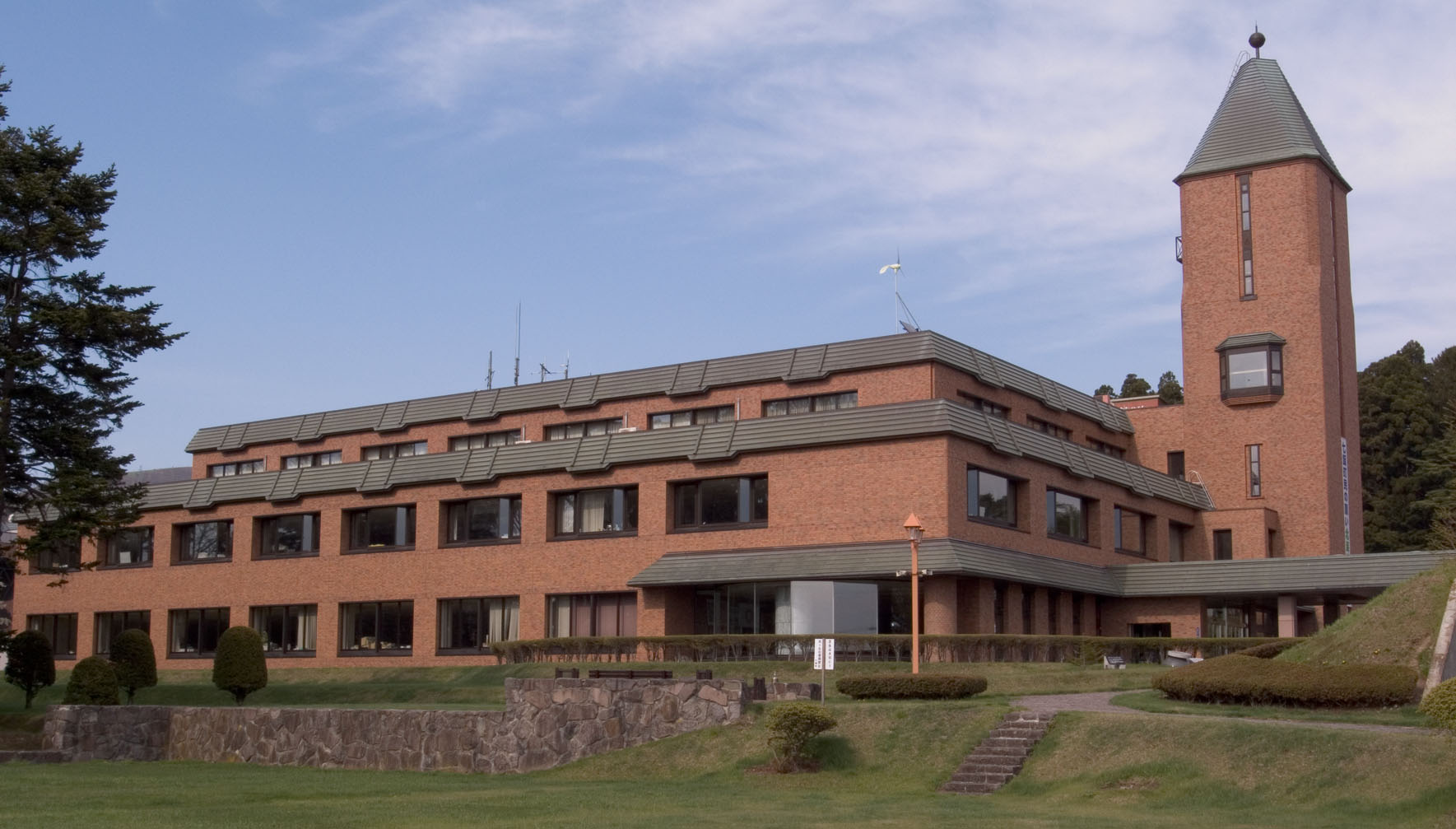
- Nanae Town Hall (May 2009)

- Flag Seal

- The location of Nanae in Oshima Subprefecture.

- Location of Nanae in Japan
- Coordinates: 41°54′N 140°42′E
- Country: Japan
- Prefecture: Hokkaido
- Subprefecture: Oshima Subprefecture
- District: Kameda
- Established: 1879

Government
  - Mayor: Yasuichi Chūgō (安一 中宮)

Area
  - Total: 216.61 km^{2} (83.63 sq mi)

Population (April 30, 2017)
  - Total: 28,514
  - Density: 131.64/km^{2} (340.94/sq mi)
- Post code: 041-1192
- Area code: 01337
- Official Tree: Japanese Red Pine
- Official Flower: Apple
- Government Office Address: 6-1-1 Hon-chō, Nanae-chō, Kameda-gun, Hokkaidō 041-1192
- Government Office Telephone: 0138-65-2511
- Website: www.town.nanae.hokkaido.jp

Nanae (七飯町, Nanae-chō) is a town located in Oshima Subprefecture, Hokkaido, Japan. In April 2017, the town had an estimated population of 28,514, with 13,639 households, and a population density of 130/km^{2} (340/sq mi). The total area is 216.61 km^{2} (83.63 sq mi).

== Geography ==
Nanae is at the southern end of the Oshima Peninsula, about 16 km (9.9 mi) away from Hakodate. The name of "Nanae" (七飯) is derived from two former villages, Nanae (七重) and Iida (飯田)

Hokkaidō Koma-ga-take (北海道駒ヶ岳, Hokkaidō Koma-ga-take), a 1,133 m (3,717 ft) stratovolcano, is the highest mountain in the town, located on the town's boundary with Mori and Shikabe.

Part of the Ōnuma Quasi-National Park (大沼国定公園, Ōnuma Kokutei Kōen), including the Ōnuma (大沼) and Konuma (小沼) ponds, is located within the town boundaries of Nanae.

== History ==
- 1897: Nanae village and Iida village was merged to form Nanae village.
- 1902: Nanae village was merged with neighboring villages and became a Second Class Village.
- 1957: Nanae village became Nanae town.

== Transportation ==
=== Rail ===
Nanae is served by the JR Hokkaido Hakodate Main Line, which links Hakodate with Sapporo and Asahikawa.

Formerly, Sawara Branch Line also ran through the town. Ikedaen, Nagareyama Onsen, and Chōshiguchi station, three of the stations on the branch line, closed on 12 March 2022.

Stations of the rail lines located in the town are as the following:

- Hakodate Main Line: Ōnakayama - Nanae - Oshima-Ōno(Hokuto) - Niyama - Ōnuma - Ōnuma-Kōen
- ~~Hakodate Main Line (Sawara Branch Line): Ōnuma - Ikedaen - Nagareyama Onsen - Chōshiguchi~~

=== Road ===
National Route 5, a major highway in the prefecture, runs through the town, connecting it to Hakodate and the rest of Hokkaido, including Otaru and Sapporo.

== Education ==
- Nanae Town Board Of Education
  - High school
    - Hokkaido Nanae High School
  - Middle schools
    - Nanae Junior High School
    - Onakayama Junior High School
  - Elementary schools
    - Fujishiro Elementary School
    - Nanae Elementary School
    - Onakayama Elementary School
    - Togeshita Elementary School

== Sister cities ==
=== Domestic ===
- (Japan) Miki, Kagawa

=== International ===
- Concord, Massachusetts, United States

== See also ==
- Ōnuma Quasi-National Park
