= Oriwatari Station =

Railway station in Yurihonjō, Akita Prefecture, Japan

Oriwatari Station 折渡駅
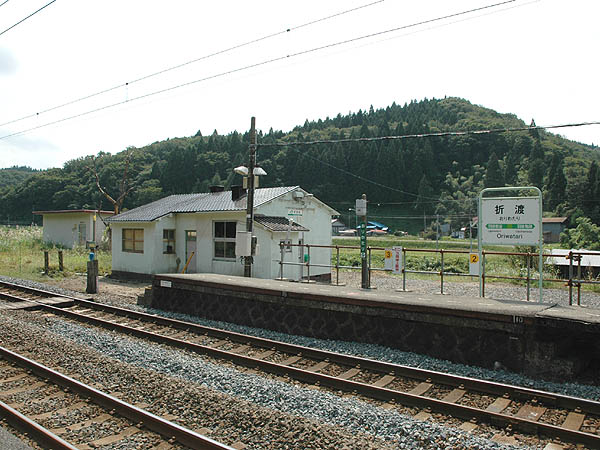
- Oriwatari Station, September 2005

General information
- Location: 101 Miyata, Iwaki-Kamikurokawa, Yurihonjō-shi, Akita-ken 018-1213; Japan
- Coordinates: 39°28′35″N 140°5′28.15″E
- Operator: JR East
- Line: ■ Uetsu Main Line
- Distance: 240.7 kilometers from Niitsu
- Platforms: 1 side platform

Other information
- Status: Unstaffed
- Website: Official website

History
- Opened: April 1, 1987

Services
Preceding station	JR East	Following station
Ugo-Iwaya towards Niitsu	Uetsu Main Line	Ugo-Kameda towards Akita
Location
- Location within Akita Prefecture Location within Japan

Oriwatari Station (折渡駅, Oriwatari-eki) is a railway station in the city of Yurihonjō, Akita Prefecture, Japan, operated by JR East.

== Lines ==
Oriwatari Station is served by the Uetsu Main Line, and is located 240.7 kilometres (149.6 mi) from the terminus of the line at Niitsu Station.

== Station layout ==
The station has two opposed side platforms connected by a level crossing. The platforms are short, and can accommodate trains of only three carriages or less. The station is unattended.

=== Platforms ===
1	■ Uetsu Main Line	for Akita
2	■ Uetsu Main Line	for Ugo-Honjō and Sakata

== History ==
Oriwatari Station began as Oriwatari Signal Stop (折渡信号場) on September 28, 1957. It was elevated to a full station at the time of the privatization of the Japan National Railway (JNR) on April 1, 1987.

== Surrounding area ==
- National Route 341

== See also ==
- List of railway stations in Japan
