= Ōnuma Quasi-National Park =

Quasi-National park in Hokkaidō

- 大沼国定公園
- IUCN category II (national park)
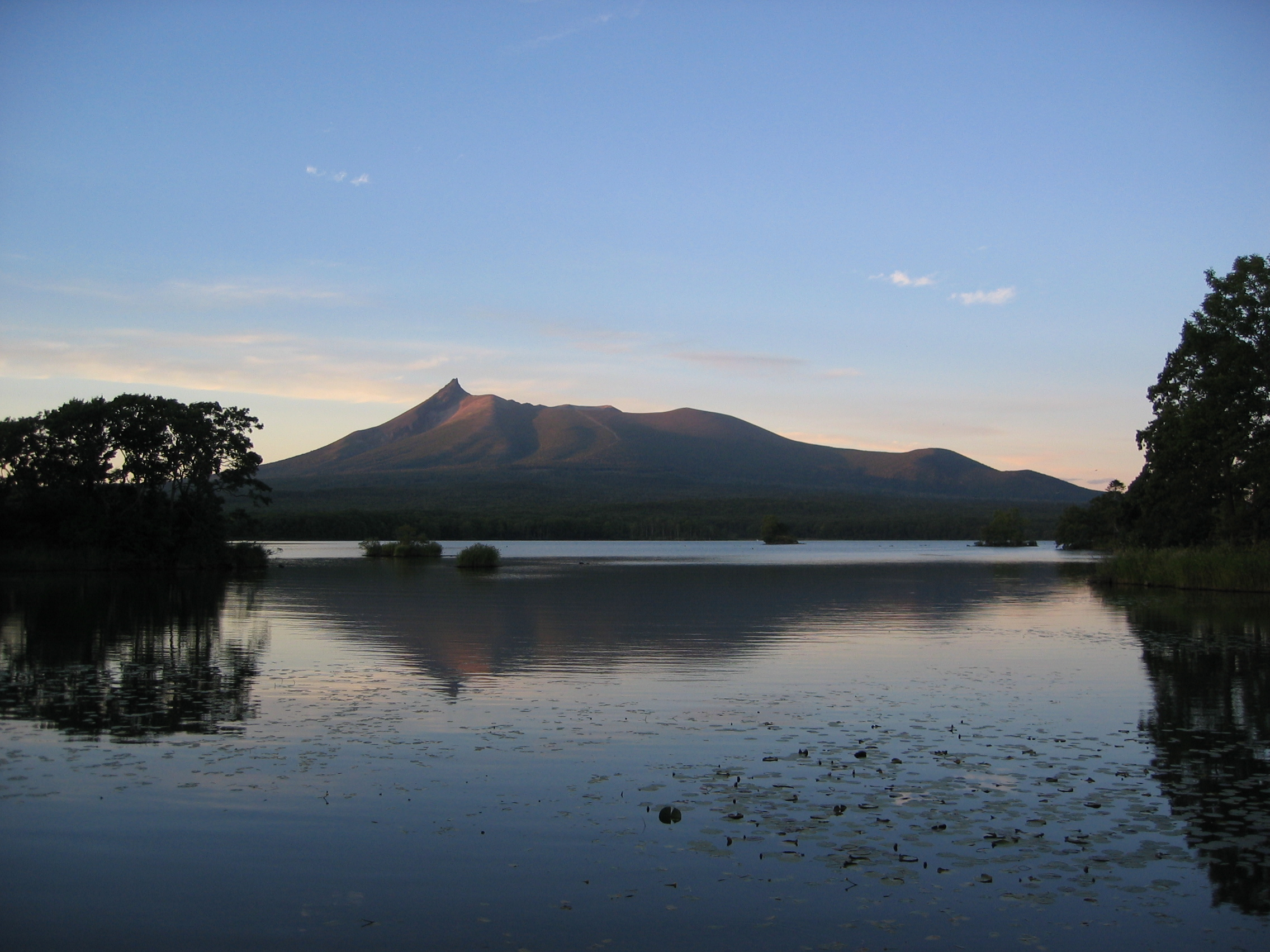
- Hokkaidō Komagatake, in the center of the park, at dusk.

- Location within Japan
- Location: Hokkaidō, Japan
- Nearest city: Nanae
- Coordinates: 42.0121°N 140.671°E
- Area: 90.83 km^{2} (35.07 mi^{2})
- Established: July 1, 1958

Ramsar Wetland
- Official name: Onuma
- Designated: 3 July 2012
- Reference no.: 2058

Ōnuma Quasi-National Park (大沼国定公園, Ōnuma Kokutei Kōen) is a 90.83 km^{2} (35.07 mi^{2}) quasi-national park on the Oshima Peninsula in southwest Hokkaidō, Japan. The park encompasses the volcanic Hokkaidō Komagatake (北海道駒ケ岳, Hokkaidō Koma-ga-take) as well as the Ōnuma (大沼) and Konuma (小沼) ponds, which abut against the west slope of the mountain. The park, which was designated as quasi-national in 1958, is the smallest major park in Hokkaidō.

Ōnuma and Konuma were created when mudflows due to eruptions of Hokkaidō Koma-ga-take dammed up depressions at the base of the mountain. The ponds, which are dotted with watershields, are surrounded by birch and maple forests.

== Gallery ==
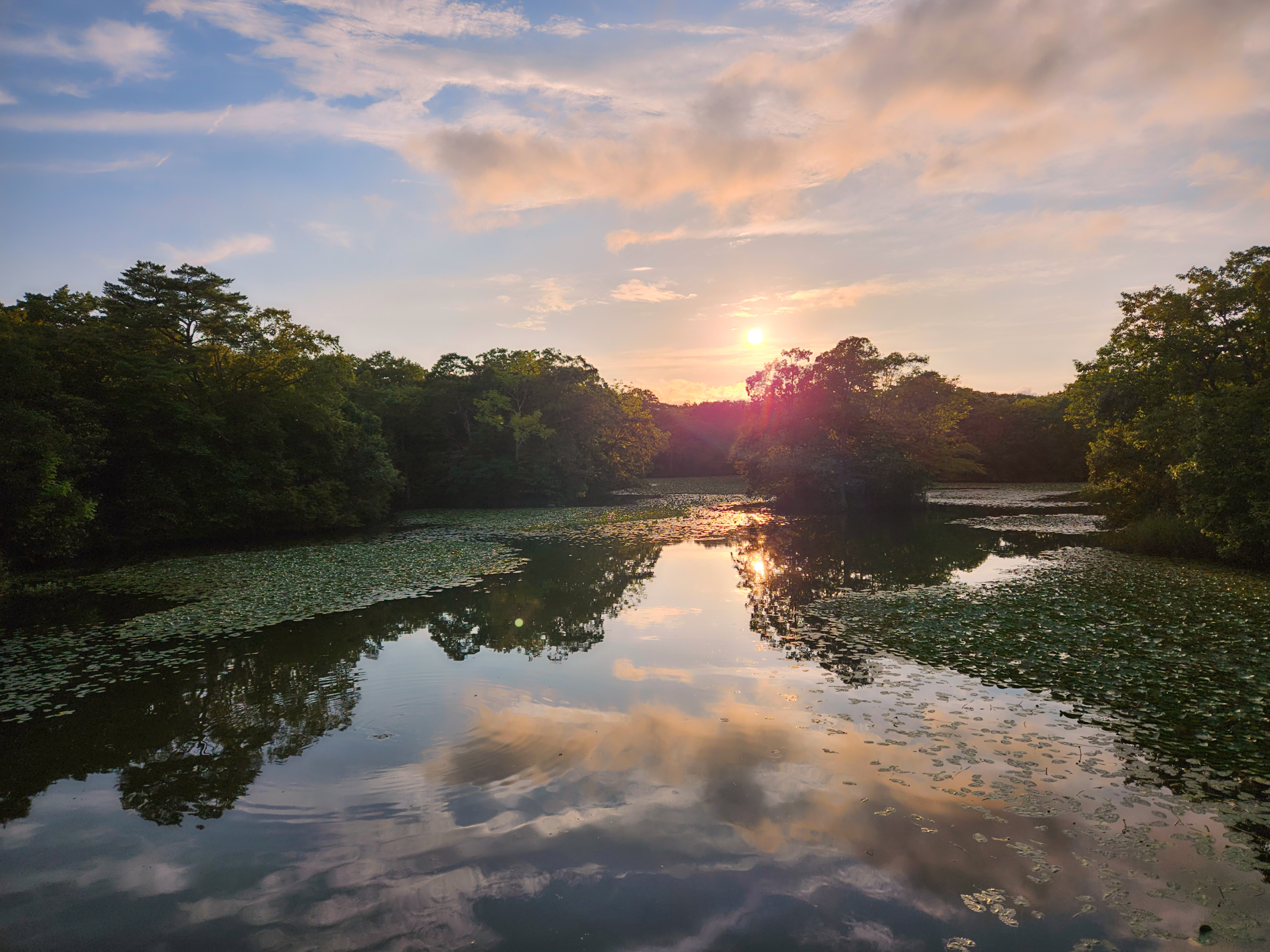

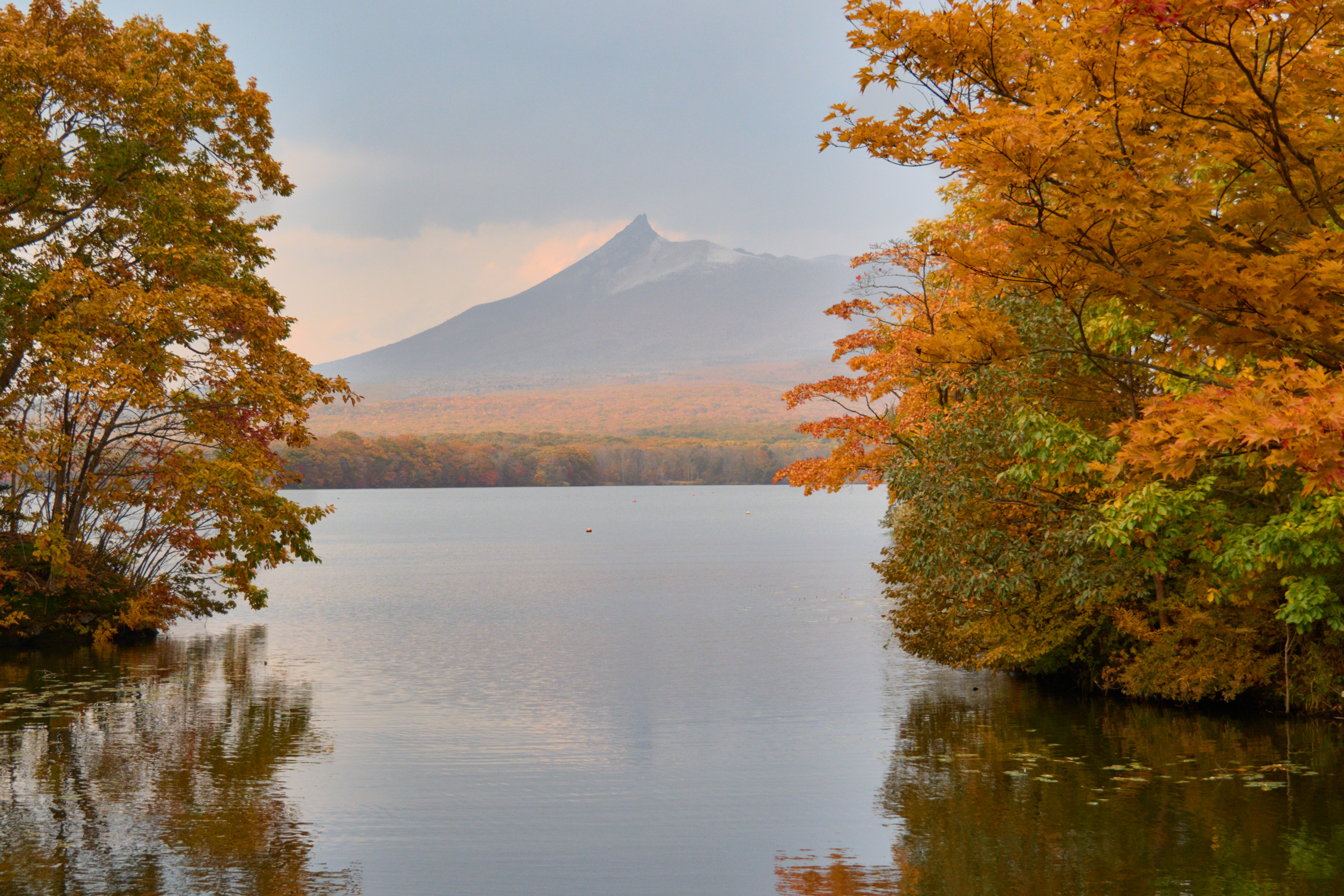

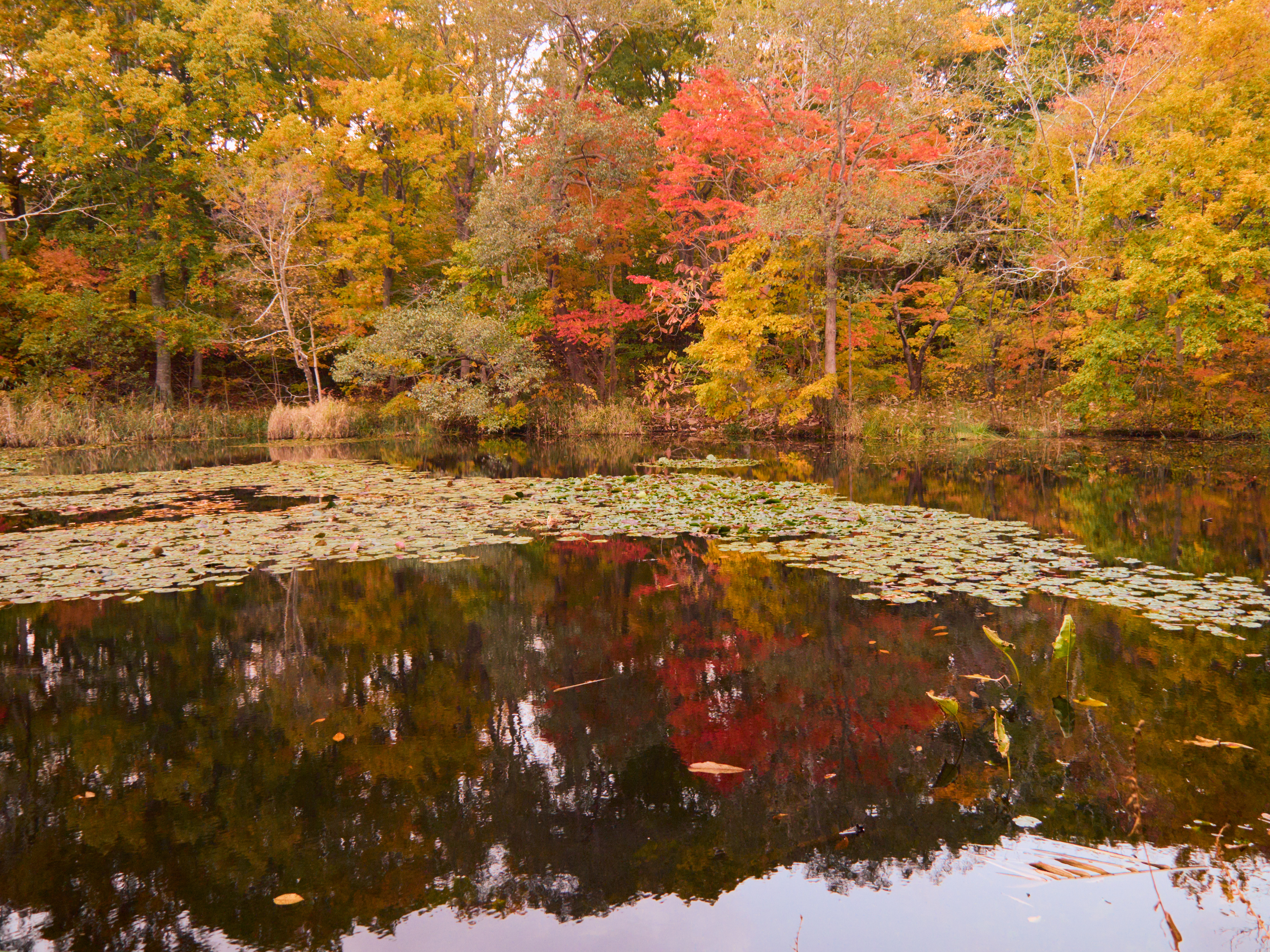

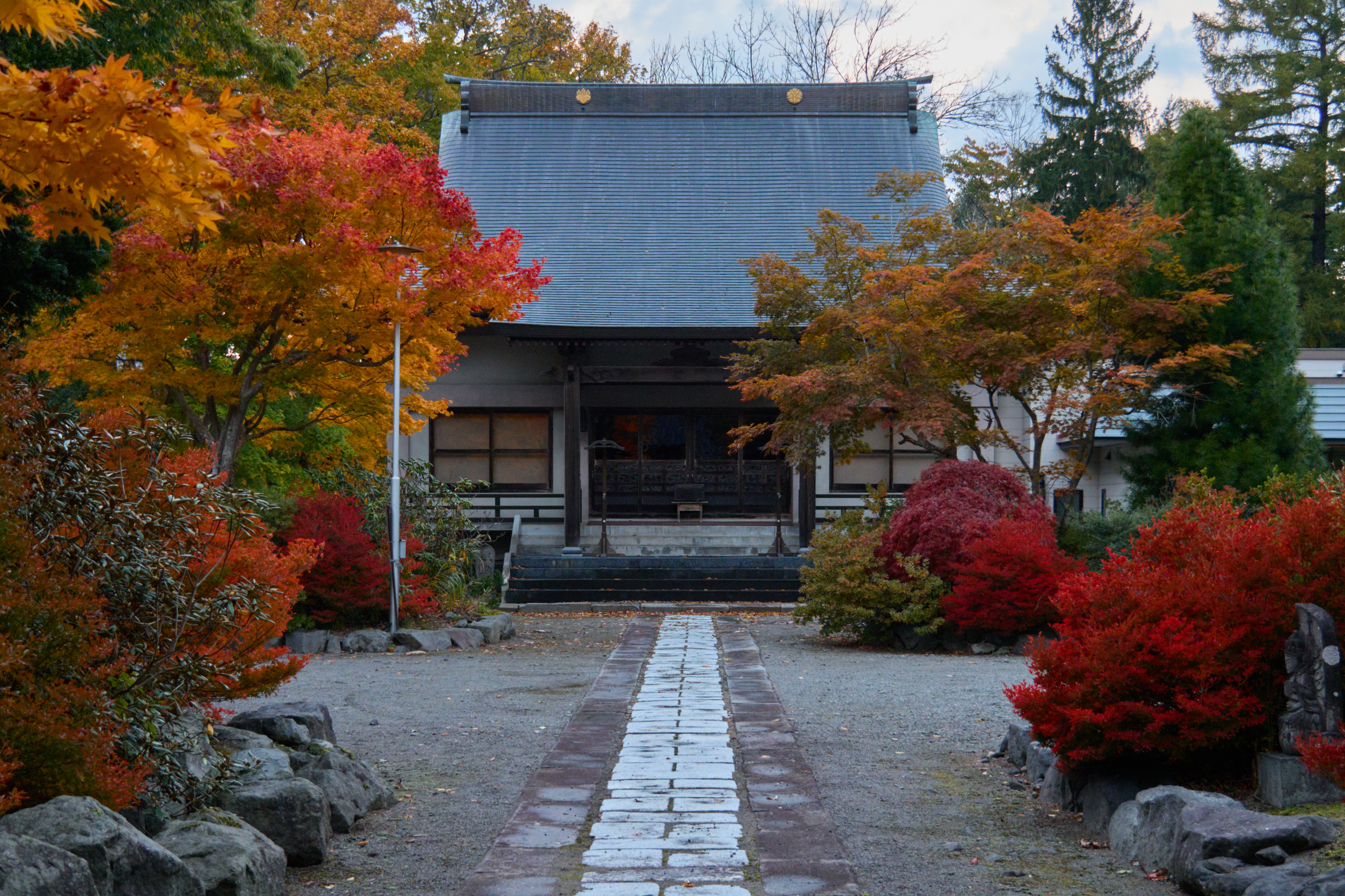

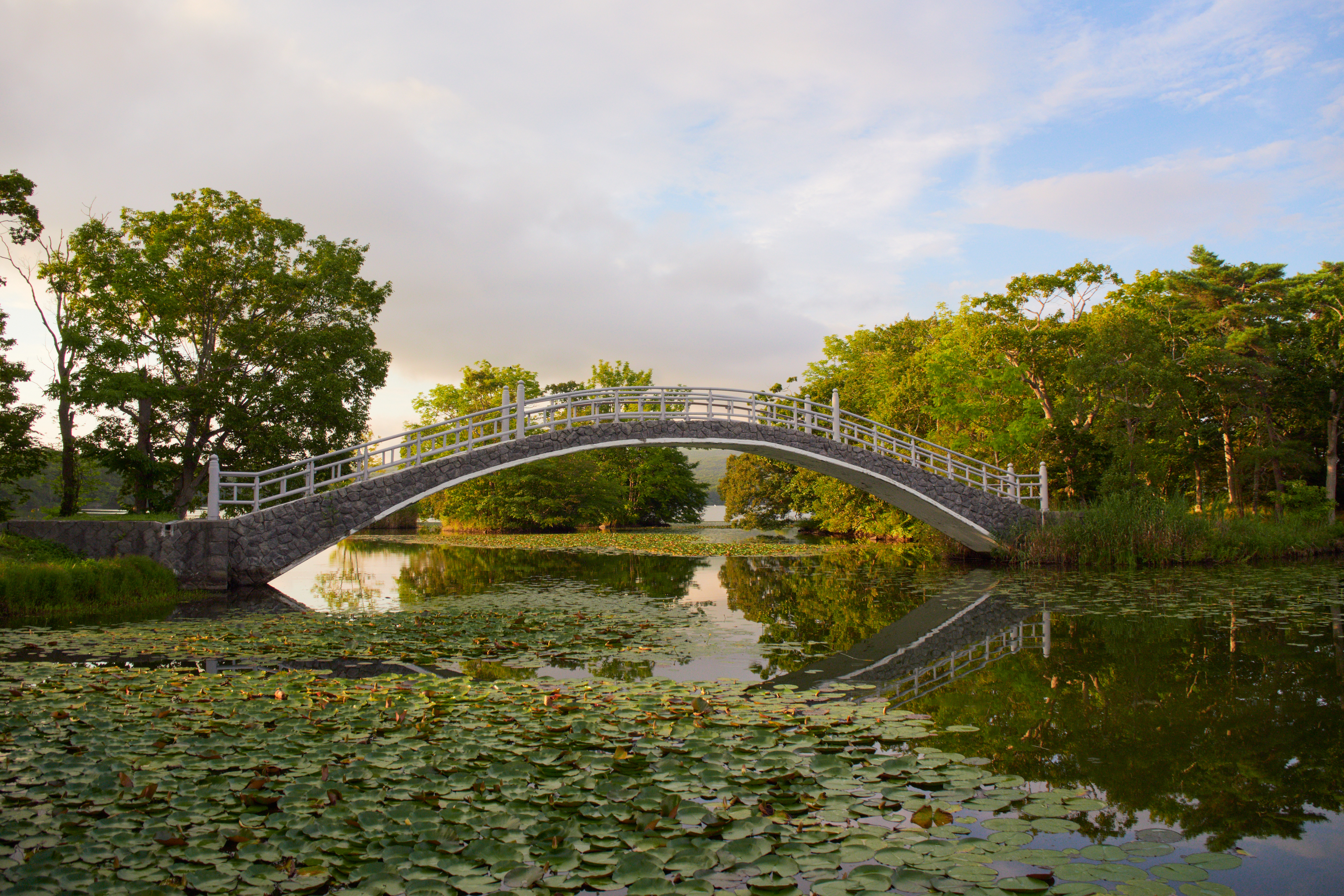

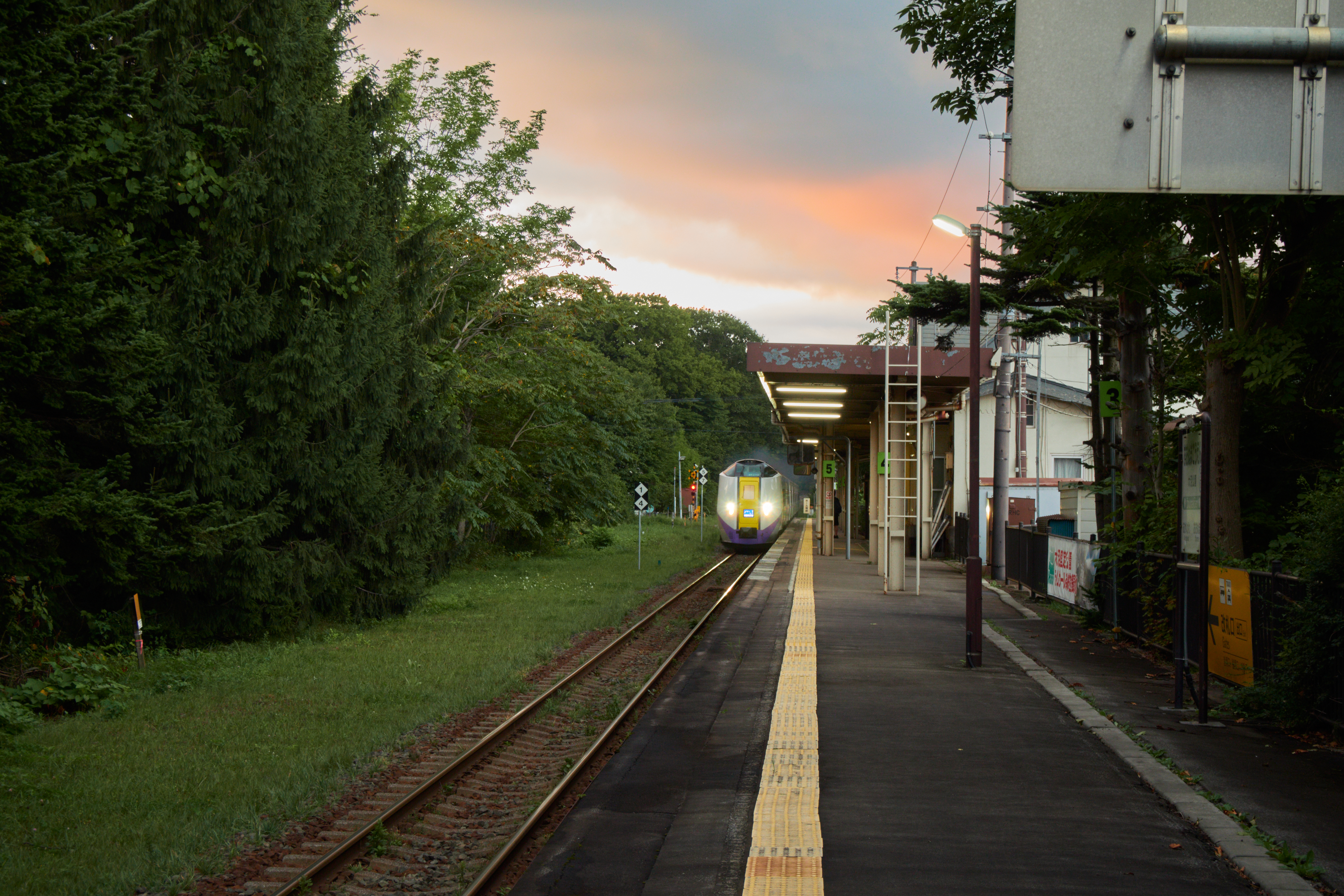

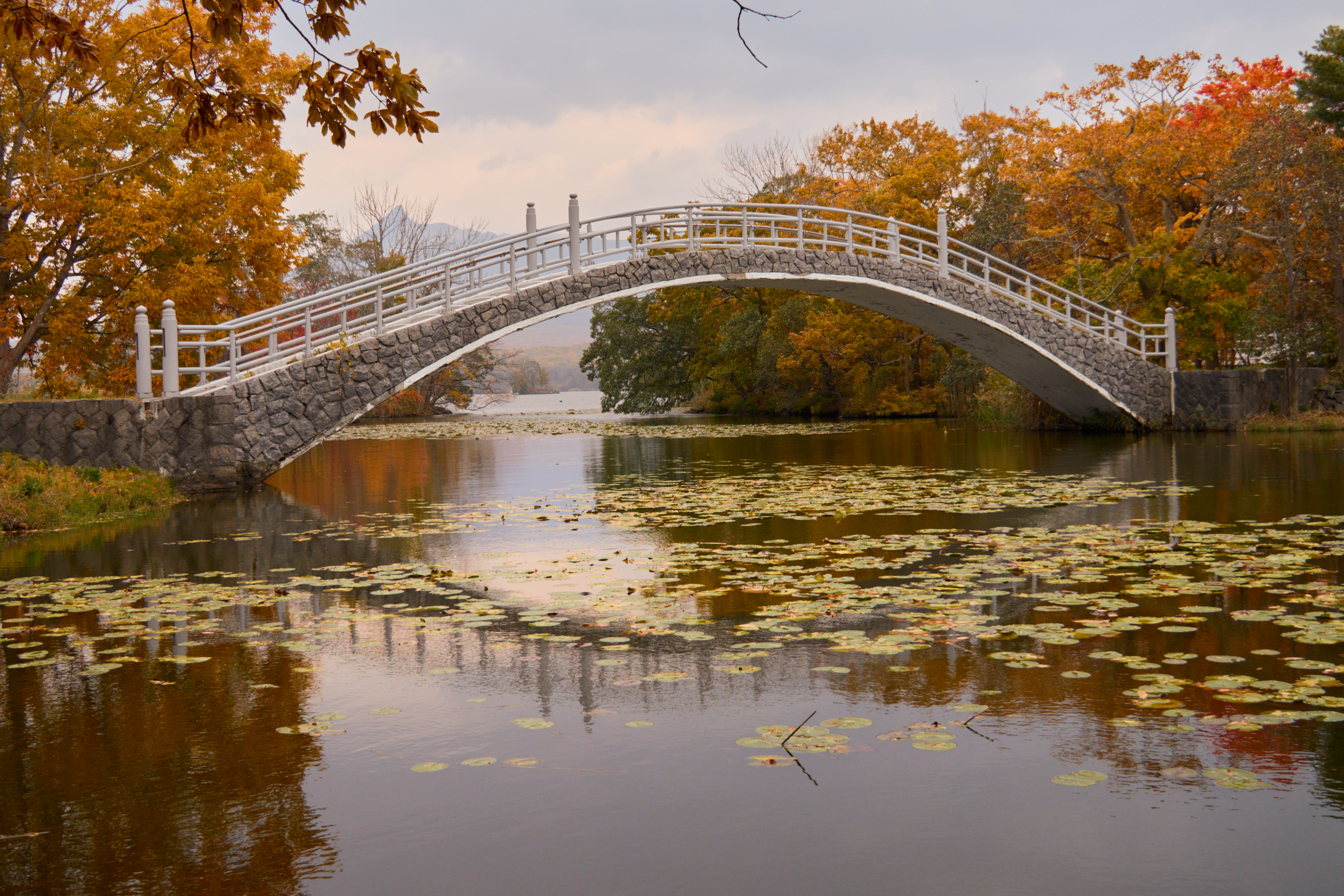

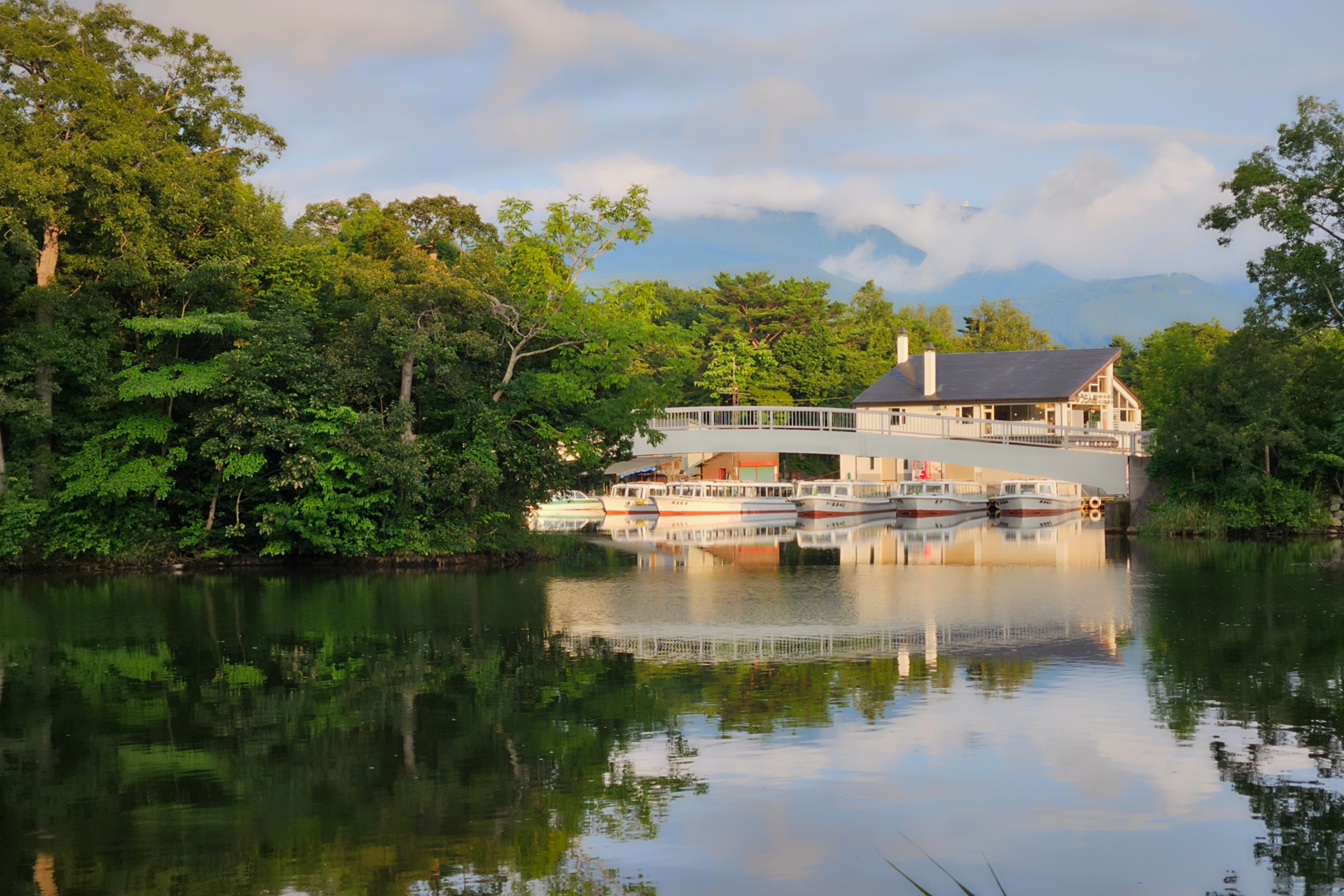

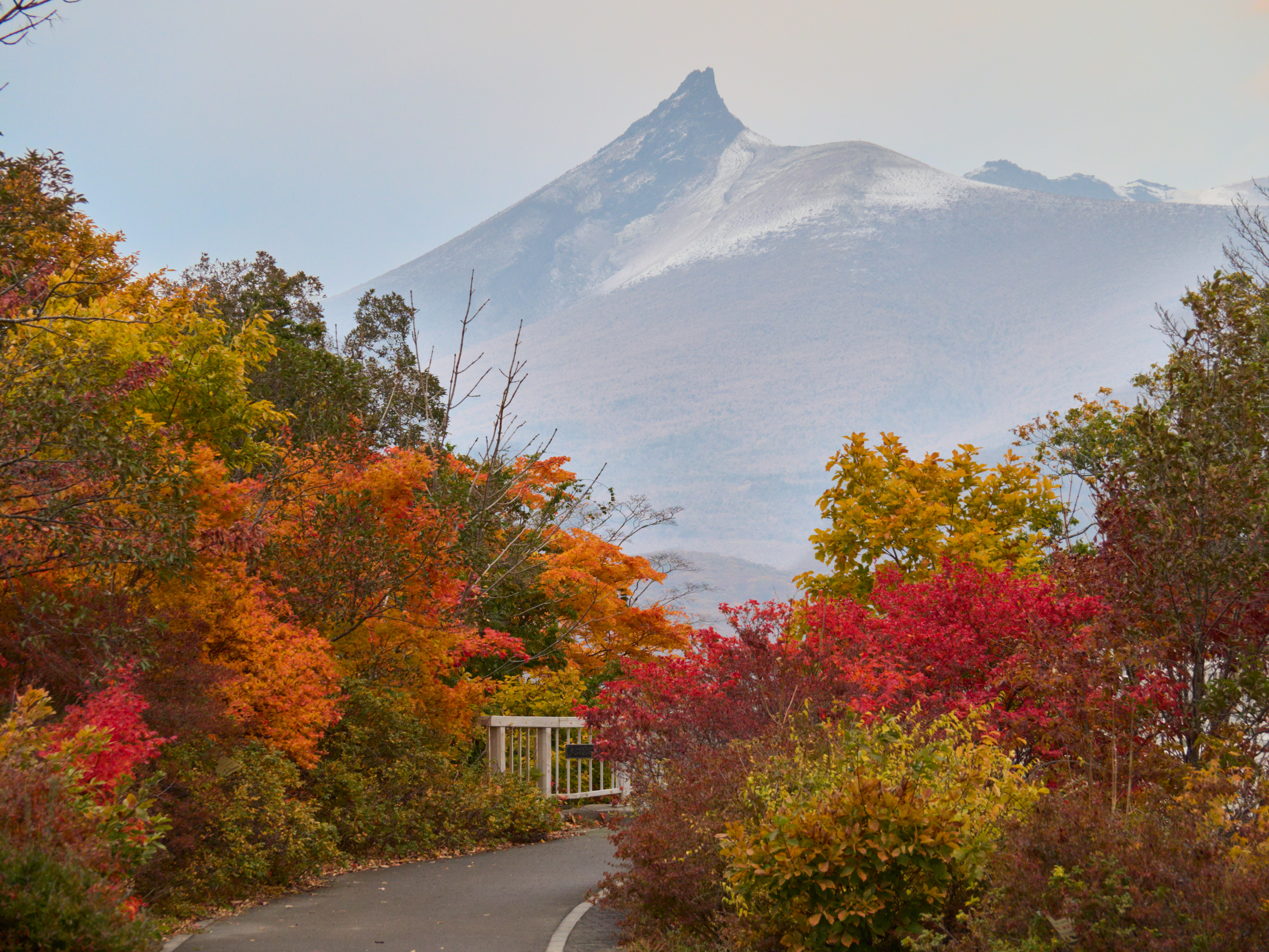

== Related cities, towns and villages ==
- Nanae, Hokkaidō

== See also ==
- List of national parks of Japan
