= Katsurane Station =

Railway station in Akita, Akita Prefecture, Japan

Katsurane Station 桂根駅
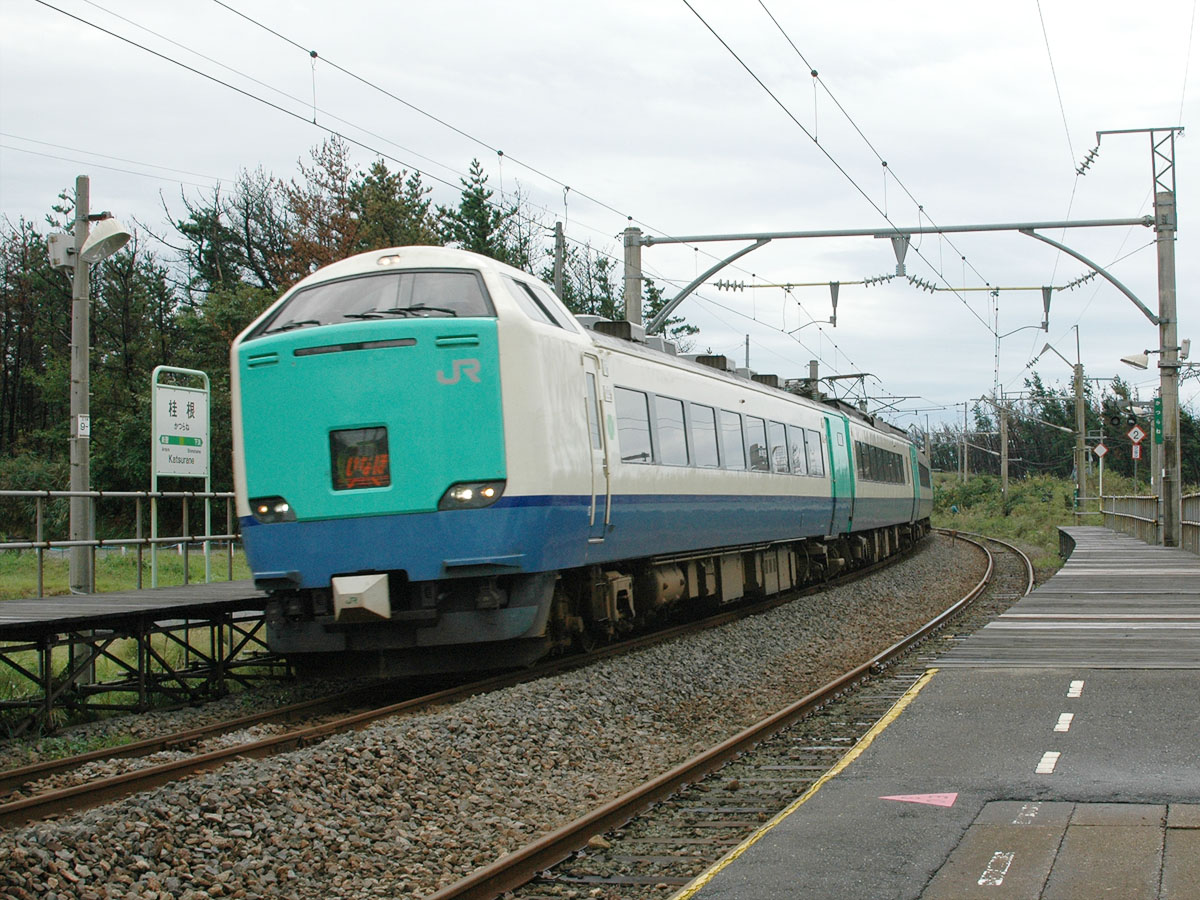
- A JR East Inaho limited express train passing through Katsurane Station

General information
- Location: 173 Hamazoe, Shimohama-Katsurane, Akita-shi, Akita-ken 010-1501; Japan
- Coordinates: 39°38′52.44″N 140°3′58.85″E
- Operator: JR East
- Line: ■ Uetsu Main Line
- Distance: 261.7 kilometres (162.6 mi) from Niitsu
- Platforms: 2 side platforms

Other information
- Status: Unstaffed
- Website: Official website

History
- Opened: 31 March 1987

Services
Preceding station	JR East	Following station
Shimohama towards Niitsu	Uetsu Main Line	Araya towards Akita
Location
- Location within Akita Prefecture Location within Japan

Katsurane Station (桂根駅, Katsurane-eki) is a railway station in the city of Akita, Akita Prefecture, Japan, operated by JR East.

== Lines ==
Katsurane Station is served by the Uetsu Main Line, and is located 261.7 kilometres (162.6 mi) from the terminus of the line at Niitsu Station.

== Station layout ==
The station has two opposed side platforms connected by a level crossing; however, only one platform is normally used for passenger traffic. The station is unattended.

=== Platforms ===
1	■ Uetsu Main Line	for Araya and Akita for Ugo-Honjō and Sakata
2	■ Uetsu Main Line	not normally used

== History ==
Katsurane Station opened as the Katsurane Signal Stop on 30 September 1962. It became a full passenger station on 31 March 1987.

== Surrounding area ==
- National Route 7
- Katsurane Beach

== See also ==
- List of railway stations in Japan
