= Iwaki-Minato Station =

Railway station in Yurihonjō, Akita Prefecture, Japan

Iwaki-Minato Station 岩城みなと駅
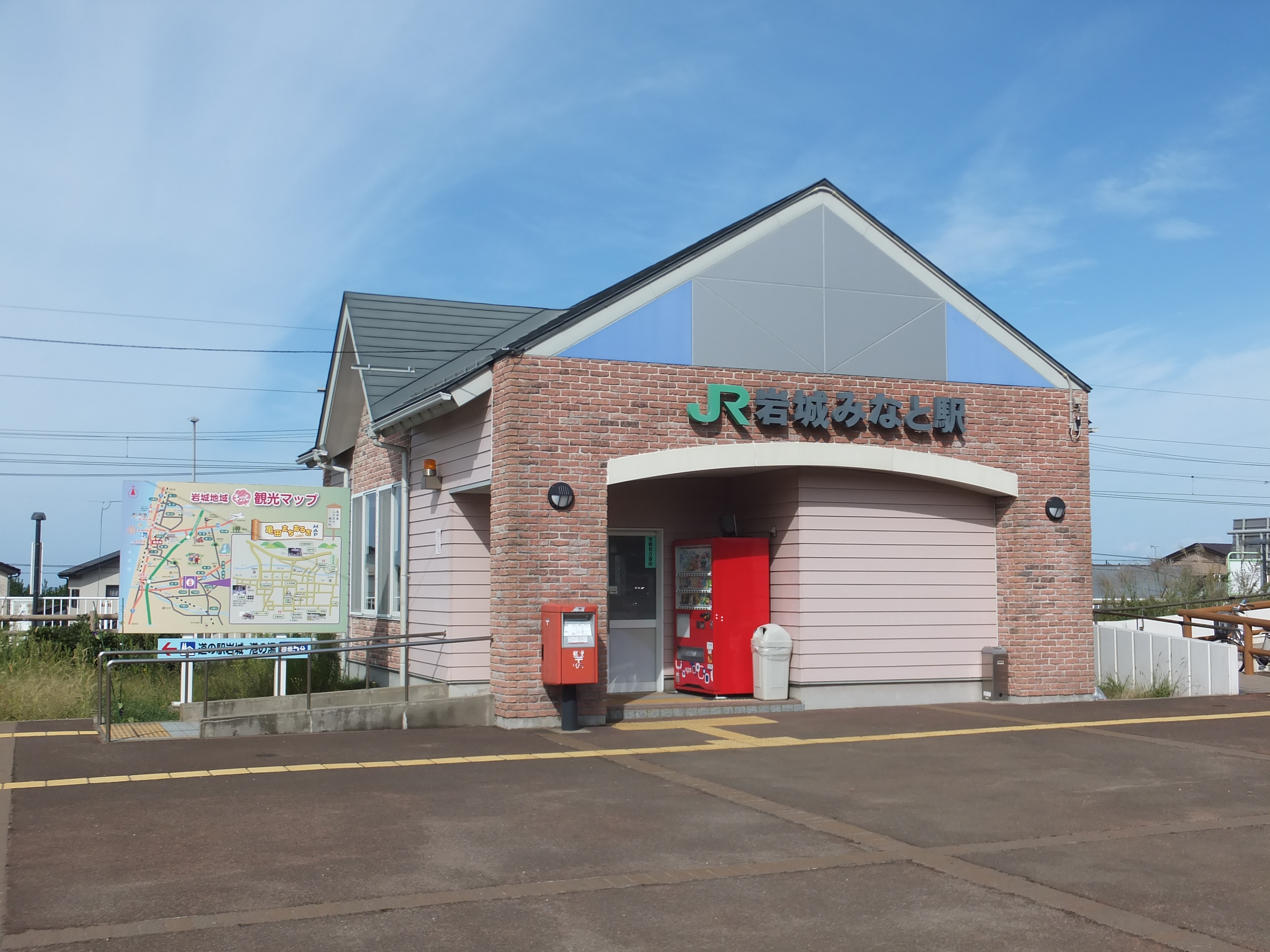
- Iwaki-Minato Station, September 2017

General information
- Location: 28-39 Mizunomiba-28 Iwakiuchimichikawa, Yurihonjō-shi, Akita-ken 018-1301; Japan
- Coordinates: 39°32′43.76″N 140°3′18.46″E
- Operator: JR East
- Line: ■ Uetsu Main Line
- Distance: 250.2 kilometers from Niitsu
- Platforms: 1 side platform

Other information
- Status: Unstaffed station
- Website: Official website

History
- Opened: December 1, 2001

Passengers
- FY2018: 101

Services
Preceding station	JR East	Following station
Ugo-Kameda towards Niitsu	Uetsu Main Line	Michikawa towards Akita
Location
- Location within Akita Prefecture Location within Japan

Iwaki-Minato Station (岩城みなと駅, Iwaki-Minato-eki) is a railway station in the city of Yurihonjō, Akita Prefecture, Japan, operated by JR East.

== Lines ==
Iwaki-Minato Station is served by the Uetsu Main Line, and is located 250.2 kilometres (155.5 mi) from the terminus of the line at Niitsu Station.

== Station layout ==
The station has one side platform serving a single bi-directional track. The station is unstaffed.

== History ==
Iwaki-Minato Station opened on December 1, 2001.

== Passenger statistics ==
In fiscal 2018, the station was used by an average of 101 passengers daily (boarding passengers only).

== Surrounding area ==
- National Route 7
- former Iwaki Town Hall

== See also ==
- List of railway stations in Japan
