= Nanae Station =

Railway station in Nanae, Hokkaido, Japan

H71 Nanae Station 七飯駅
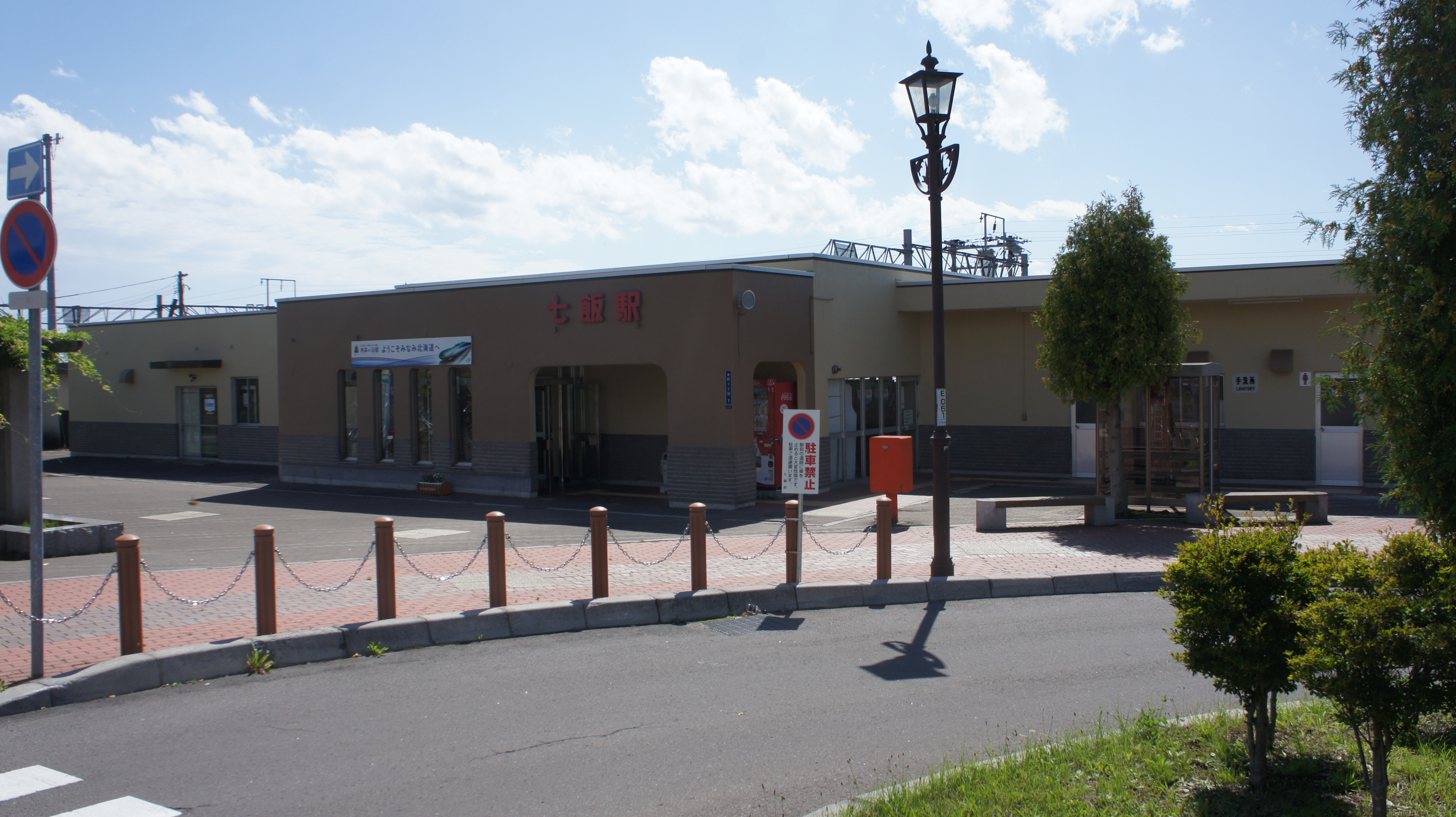
- Nanae Station in 2017

General information
- Location: 1-1-1 Honmachi, Nanae, Kameda District; Hokkaido Prefecture; Japan
- Coordinates: 41°53′13″N 140°41′20″E
- Operator: JR Hokkaido
- Line: Hakodate Main Line
- Distance: 13.8 km (8.6 mi) from Hakodate
- Platforms: 1 side + 1 island platform
- Tracks: 3

Construction
- Structure type: At grade

Other information
- Station code: H71
- Website: Staffed - JR Hokkaido ticket window (Midori no Madoguchi)

History
- Opened: 10 December 1902; 123 years ago

Services
Preceding station	JR Hokkaido	Following station
Ōnakayama towards Hakodate	Hakodate Main Line Local	Shin-Hakodate-Hokuto towards Asahikawa
Terminus	Hakodate Main Line Fujishiro branch line	Onuma Terminus
Location
- Location within Hokkaido Location within Japan

Nanae Station (七飯駅, Nanae-eki) is a railway station on the JR Hokkaido Hakodate Main Line. It is located in Nanae, Hokkaidō, Japan. It is operated by JR Hokkaido, and it has the station number "H71".

== Lines ==
The station is served by the Hakodate Main Line, and is located 13.8 km from the start of the line at Hakodate. Both local and the Rapid Hakodate Liner services stop at the station.

== Station layout ==
The station consists of a side, as well as an island platform serving three tracks.

=== Platforms ===
1	■Hakodate Main Line	For Hakodate
2	■	(siding)
3	■Hakodate Main Line	For Mori

== Adjacent stations ==
«	Service	»
Hakodate Main Line
Ōnakayama	Rapid Hakodate Liner	Shin-Hakodate-Hokuto
Ōnakayama	Local	Shin-Hakodate-Hokuto

== History ==
The station was opened on 12 October 1902 by the private Hokkaido Railway as an intermediate station during the first phase of construction of its line when track was laid from Hakodate to Hongō (today Shin-Hakodate-Hokuto). After the Hokkaido Railway was nationalized on 1 July 1907, Japanese Government Railways (JGR) took over control of the station. On 12 October 1909 the station became part of the Hakodate Main Line. On 1 April 1987, with the privatization of Japanese National Railways (JNR), the successor of JGR, control of the station passed to JR Hokkaido.

== See also ==
- List of railway stations in Japan
