= Shimohama Station =

Railway station in Akita, Akita Prefecture, Japan

Shimohama Station 下浜駅
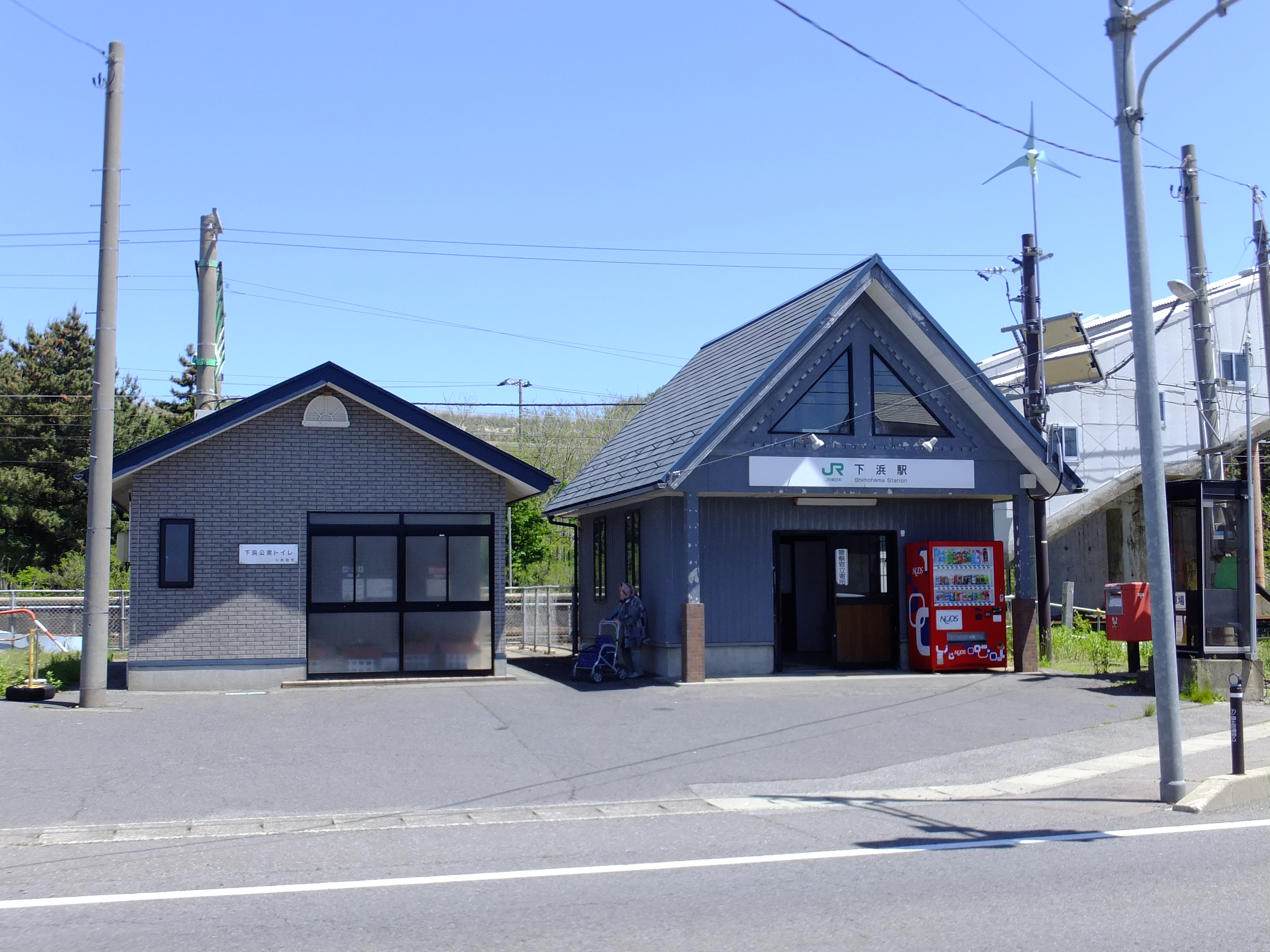
- Shimohama Station, May 2018

General information
- Location: 1 Shimono, Shimohama-Hanekawa, Akita-shi, Akita-ken, 010-1503; Japan
- Coordinates: 39°37′7.32″N 140°3′51.34″E
- Operator: JR East
- Line: ■ Uetsu Main Line
- Distance: 258.4 kilometers from Niitsu
- Platforms: 1 side + 1 island platform

Other information
- Status: Unstaffed
- Website: Official website

History
- Opened: February 22, 1920

Services
Preceding station	JR East	Following station
Michikawa towards Niitsu	Uetsu Main Line	Katsurane towards Akita
Location
- Location within Akita Prefecture Location within Japan

Shimohama Station (下浜駅, Shimohama-eki) is a railway station in the city of Akita, Akita Prefecture, Japan, operated by JR East.

== Lines ==
Shimohama Station is served by the Uetsu Main Line, and is located 258.4 kilometres (160.6 mi) from the terminus of the line at Niitsu Station.

== Station layout ==
The station has a side platform and an island platform connected by a footbridge. The station is unattended.

=== Platforms ===
1	■ Uetsu Main Line	for Akita
2	■ Uetsu Main Line	passing track
3	■ Uetsu Main Line	for Sakata and Tsuruoka

== History ==
Shimohama Station opened on February 22, 1920. With the privatization of JNR on April 1, 1987, the station came under the control of JR East.

== Surrounding area ==
- National Route 7
- Shimohama Post Office
- Shimohama Beach

== See also ==
- List of railway stations in Japan
