= Ugo-Kameda Station =

Railway station in Yurihonjō, Akita Prefecture, Japan

Ugo-Kameda Station 羽後亀田駅
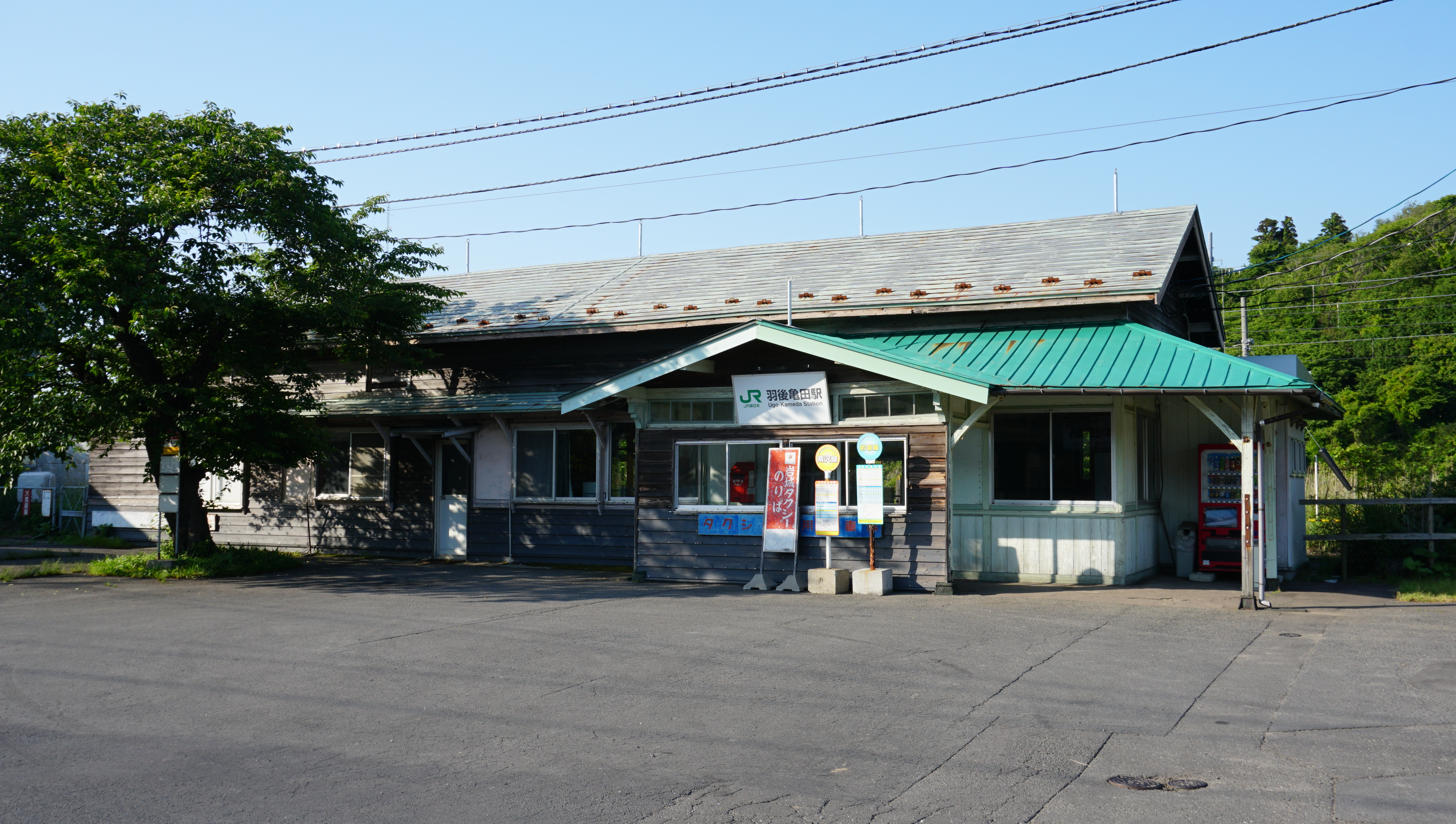
- Ugo-Kameda Station (June 3, 2018)

General information
- Location: 62 Takano, Matsugasaki, Yurihonjō-sjo, Akita-ken 015-0032; Japan
- Coordinates: 39°29′37.8″N 140°3′46.9″E
- Operator: JR East
- Line: ■ Uetsu Main Line
- Distance: 243.7 kilometers from Niitsu
- Platforms: 1 side + 1 island platform

Other information
- Status: Unstaffed station
- Website: Official website

History
- Opened: July 30, 1920

Passengers
- FY2018: 60

Services
Preceding station	JR East	Following station
Oriwatari towards Niitsu	Uetsu Main Line	Iwaki-Minato towards Akita
Location
- Location within Akita Prefecture Location within Japan

Ugo-Kameda Station (羽後亀田駅, Ugo-Kameda-eki) is a railway station in the city of Yurihonjō, Akita Prefecture, Japan, operated by JR East.

== Lines ==
Ugo-Kameda Station is served by the Uetsu Main Line, and is located 243.7 kilometres (151.4 mi) from the terminus of the line at Niitsu Station.

== Station layout ==
The station has one side platform and one island platform connected to the station building by a footbridge. The station is unstaffed.

=== Platforms ===
1	■ Uetsu Main Line	siding
2	■ Uetsu Main Line	for Akita
3	■ Uetsu Main Line	for Ugo-Honjō and Sakata

== History ==
Ugo-Kameda Station opened on July 30, 1920 as a station on the Japanese Government Railways (JGR) Rikuusai Line. It was switched to the control of the JGR Uetsu Main Line on April 20, 1924. The JGR became the JNR (Japan National Railway) after World War II. The station has been unattended since October 1981. With the privatization of the JNR on April 1, 1987, the station came under the control of the East Japan Railway Company.

== Passenger statistics ==
In fiscal 2018, the station was used by an average of 60 passengers daily (boarding passengers only).

== Surrounding area ==
- Yurihonjo City Hall – Kameda Branch office

== See also ==
- List of railway stations in Japan
