= Kameda (surname) =

Kameda (written: 亀田) is a Japanese surname. Notable people with the surname include:

- Daiki Kameda (born 1989), Japanese boxer
- Kōki Kameda (born 1986), Japanese boxer
- Seiji Kameda (born 1964), Japanese music producer, arranger, and guitarist
- Tomoki Kameda (born 1991), Japanese boxer
