= Nagareyama Onsen Station =

Railway station in Nanae, Hokkaido, Japan

Coordinates: 42.0035°N 140.7165°E

Nagareyama Onsen Station 流山温泉駅
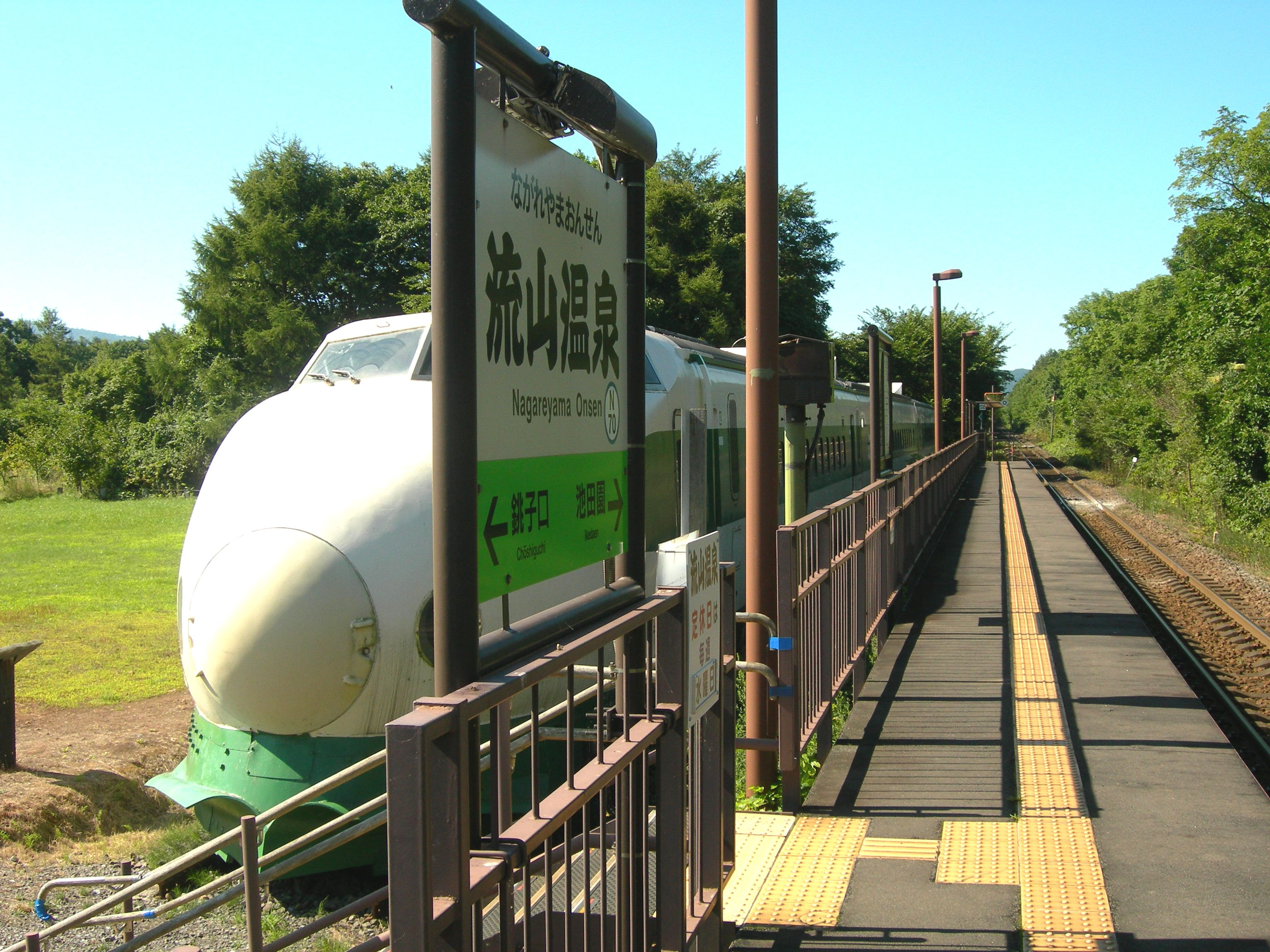
- The station platform with preserved 200 Series Shinkansen cars on display

General information
- Location: Higashi-Ōnuma, Nanae Town, Kameda District, Hokkaido; Japan
- Owner: JR Hokkaido
- Line: Hakodate Main Line (Sawara Branch line)
- Distance: 5.6km from Ōnuma
- Platforms: 1 side platform
- Tracks: 1

Other information
- Status: Unstaffed
- Station code: N 70

History
- Opened: 27 April 2002
- Closed: 12 March 2022
Location

Nagareyama Onsen Station (流山温泉駅, Nagareyama Onsen-eki) was a railway station on the Hakodate Main Line in Nanae, Hokkaido, Japan, operated by the Hokkaido Railway Company (JR Hokkaido). The station closed on March 12, 2022.

== Lines ==
Nagareyama Onsen Station was served by the Hakodate Main Line Sawara branch, and is numbered N70.

== History ==
The station opened in April 2002.
