= Akita Municipal Junior College of Arts and Crafts =

Coordinates: 39°41′11.5″N 140°5′27.8″E

- 秋田公立美術工芸短期大学
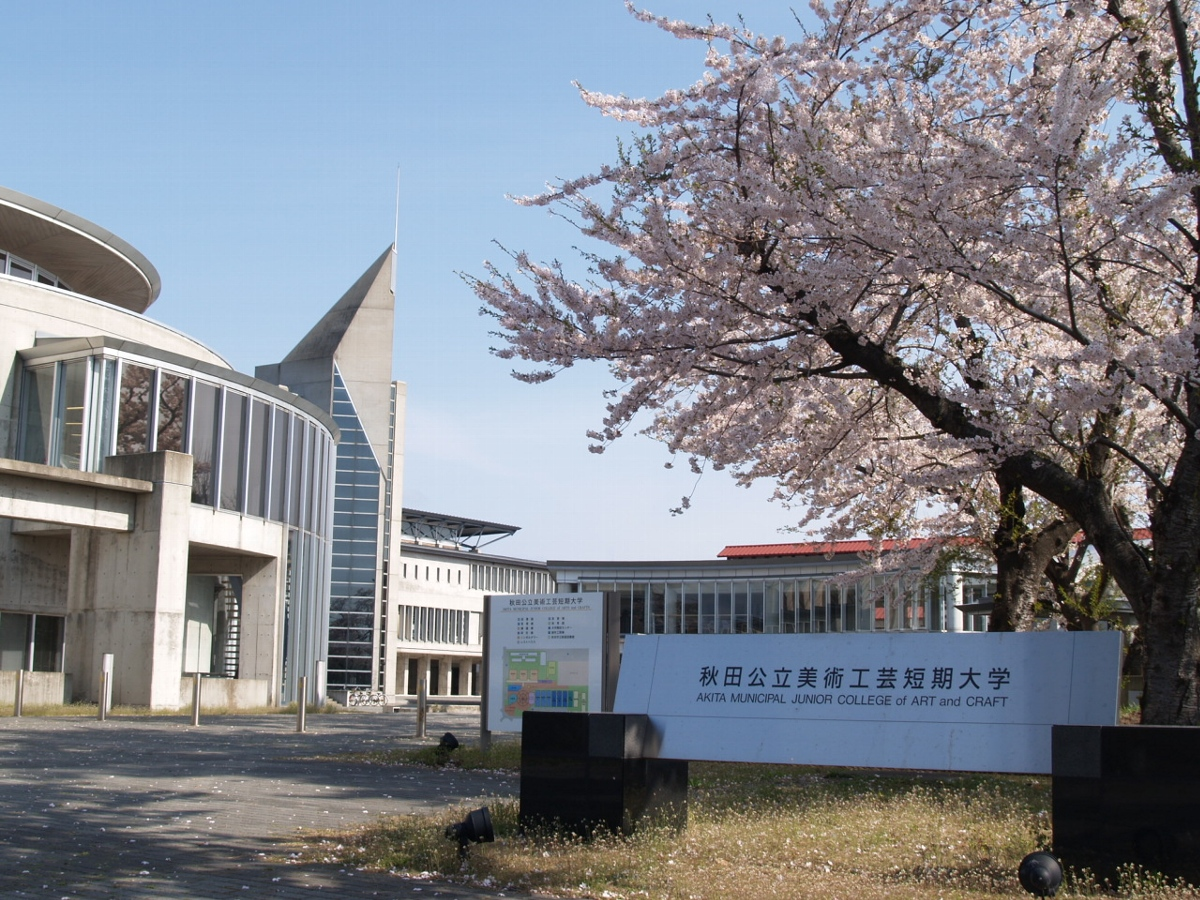
- Type: public
- Active: 1995–2015
- Location: Akita, Akita, Japan

The Akita Municipal Junior College of Arts and Crafts (秋田公立美術工芸短期大学, Akita kōritsu bijutsu kōgei tanki daigaku) is a municipal junior college in Akita City, Japan, established in 1995.

== Academic departments ==
- Craft and arts
- Industrial design
