= Kameda District, Hokkaido =

District in Hokkaido, Japan

Coordinates: 41°57′11″N 140°42′18″E

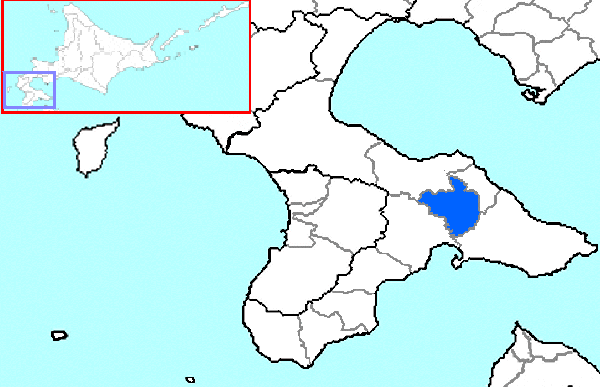
The area of Kameda District in Oshima Subprefecture.

Kameda (亀田郡, Kameda-gun) is a district located in Oshima Subprefecture, Hokkaido, Japan.

As of 2004, the district has an estimated population of 39,166 and a density of 111.43 persons per km^{2}. The total area is 351.49 km^{2} (136 miles²).

== Towns ==
- Nanae

== Merger ==
- On December 1, 2004, the towns of Esan and Toi, and the village of Todohokke merged into the expanded city of Hakodate.
- On February 1, 2006, the town of Ōno merged with the town of Kamiiso, from Kamiiso District, to form the new city of Hokuto.
