= List of places of scenic beauty of Japan (Akita) =

This list is of the places of scenic beauty of Japan located within the Prefecture of Akita.

== National Places of Scenic Beauty ==
As of 24 June 2024, seven Places have been designated at a national level (including one *Special Place of Scenic Beauty); Lake Towada-Oirase River spans the prefectural borders with Aomori and Landscape of Oku no Hosomichi is a serial designation spanning ten prefectures.

Site	Municipality	Comments	Image	Coordinates	Type	Ref.
*Lake Towada-Oirase River 十和田湖および奥入瀬渓流; Towada-ko oyobi Oirase-keiryū	Kosaka	also a Natural Monument; designation includes an area of Towada in Aomori Prefecture		40°28′17″N 140°52′33″E	6	
Former Akita Domain Satake Clan Villa (Joshitei) Gardens 旧秋田藩主佐竹氏別邸（如斯亭）庭園; Kyū-Akita-han-shu Satake-shi bettei (Joshitei) teien	Akita			39°44′03″N 140°07′45″E	1	
Former Ikeda Family Gardens 旧池田氏庭園; Kyū-Ikeda-shi teien	Daisen			39°28′01″N 140°32′35″E	1	
Naso Falls and Valley 奈曽の白瀑谷; Naso-no-shirataki-dani	Nikaho			39°10′53″N 139°56′35″E	6, 11	
Hinokinai River Embankment (cherry blossoms) 檜木内川堤（サクラ） Hinokinai-gawa zutsumi (sakura)	Semboku			39°36′03″N 140°33′28″E	3	
Landscape of Oku no Hosomichi - Kisakata-Shiokoshi おくのほそ道の風景地 象潟及び汐越; Oku no Hosomichi no fūkei-chi Kisakata oyobi Shiokoshi	Nikaho	designation spans ten prefectures		39°13′12″N 139°54′28″E		
Torigata Kaikan Gardens 鳥潟会館庭園; Torigata-kaikan teien	Ōdate			40°19′55″N 140°33′12″E	1	

== Prefectural Places of Scenic Beauty ==
As of 29 June 2023, three Places have been designated at a prefectural level.

Site	Municipality	Comments	Image	Coordinates	Type	Ref.
Torigata Kaikan (Former Torigata Family Residence) Gardens 鳥潟会館 (旧鳥潟家住宅) 庭園; Torigata-kaikan (kyū-Torigata-ke jūtaku) teien	Ōdate			40°19′55″N 140°33′12″E		
Komata-kyō 小又峡; Komata-kyō	Kita-Akita	also a Prefectural Natural Monument		40°01′49″N 140°37′12″E		
Hottai Falls and Potholes 法体の滝および甌穴; Hottai-no-taki oyobi ōketsu	Yurihonjō	also a Prefectural Natural Monument		39°06′29″N 140°09′34″E		

== Municipal Places of Scenic Beauty ==
As of 1 May 2023, five Places have been designated at a municipal level.

Site	Municipality	Comments	Image	Coordinates	Type	Ref.
Tennō Spring 天王清水 (泉); Tennō shimizu (izumi)	Daisen			39°31′02″N 140°34′03″E		
Arawa Jinja Precinct 新波神社の境内 (一式); Arawa Jinja no keidai (isshiki)	Akita			39°31′37″N 140°13′51″E		
Senshū Park (Kubota Castle Site) 千秋公園 (久保田城跡); Senshū kōen (Kubota-jō ato)	Akita			39°43′17″N 140°07′24″E		

== See also ==
- Cultural Properties of Japan
- List of parks and gardens of Akita Prefecture
- List of Historic Sites of Japan (Akita)
- List of Cultural Properties of Japan – paintings (Akita)
