= TDK Akita General Sports Center =

Sports facilities in Nikaho, Akita, Japan

Coordinates: 39°16′3.9″N 139°55′41.9″E

- TDK秋田総合スポーツセンター
- Sports Center

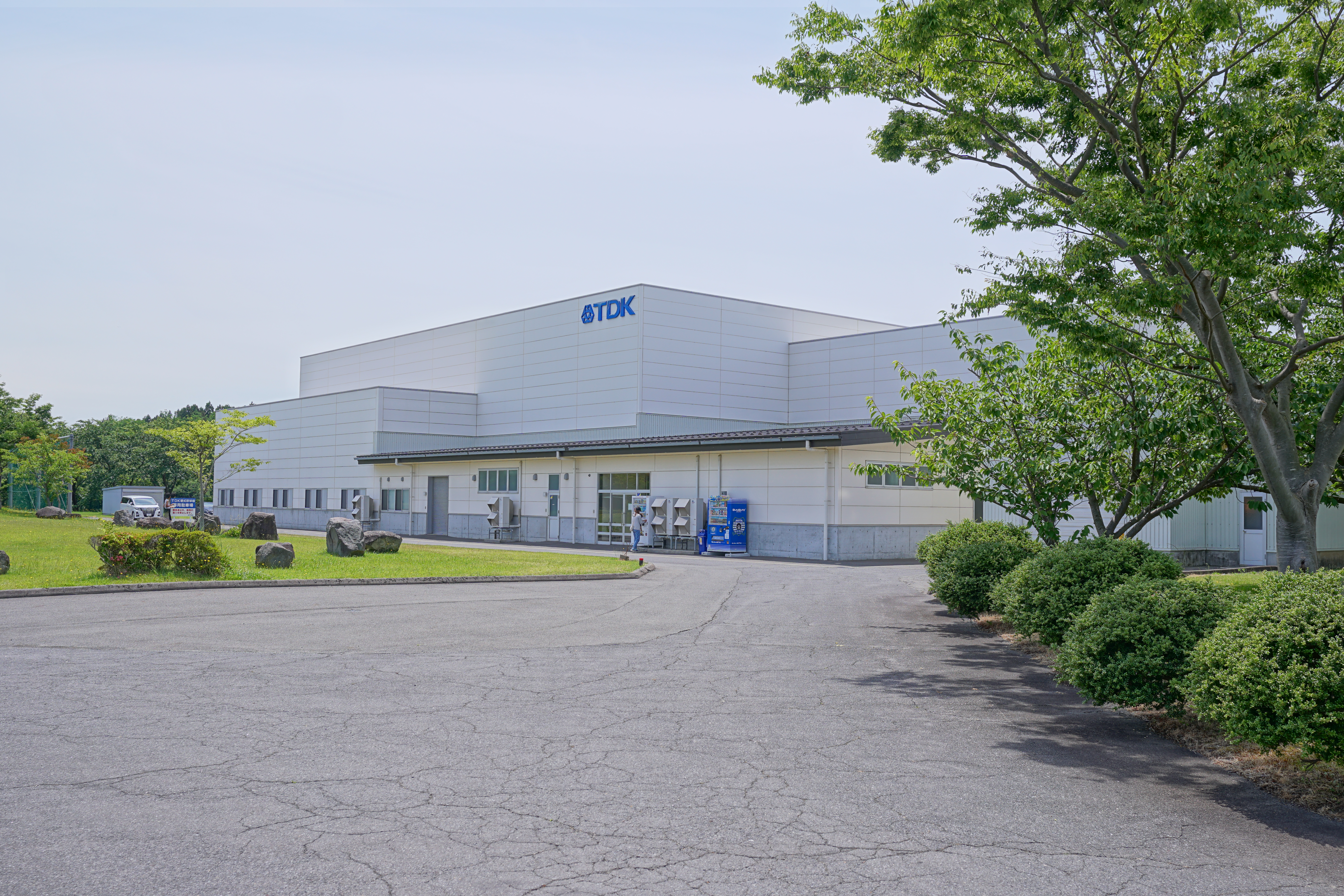
- facilities (June 2026)

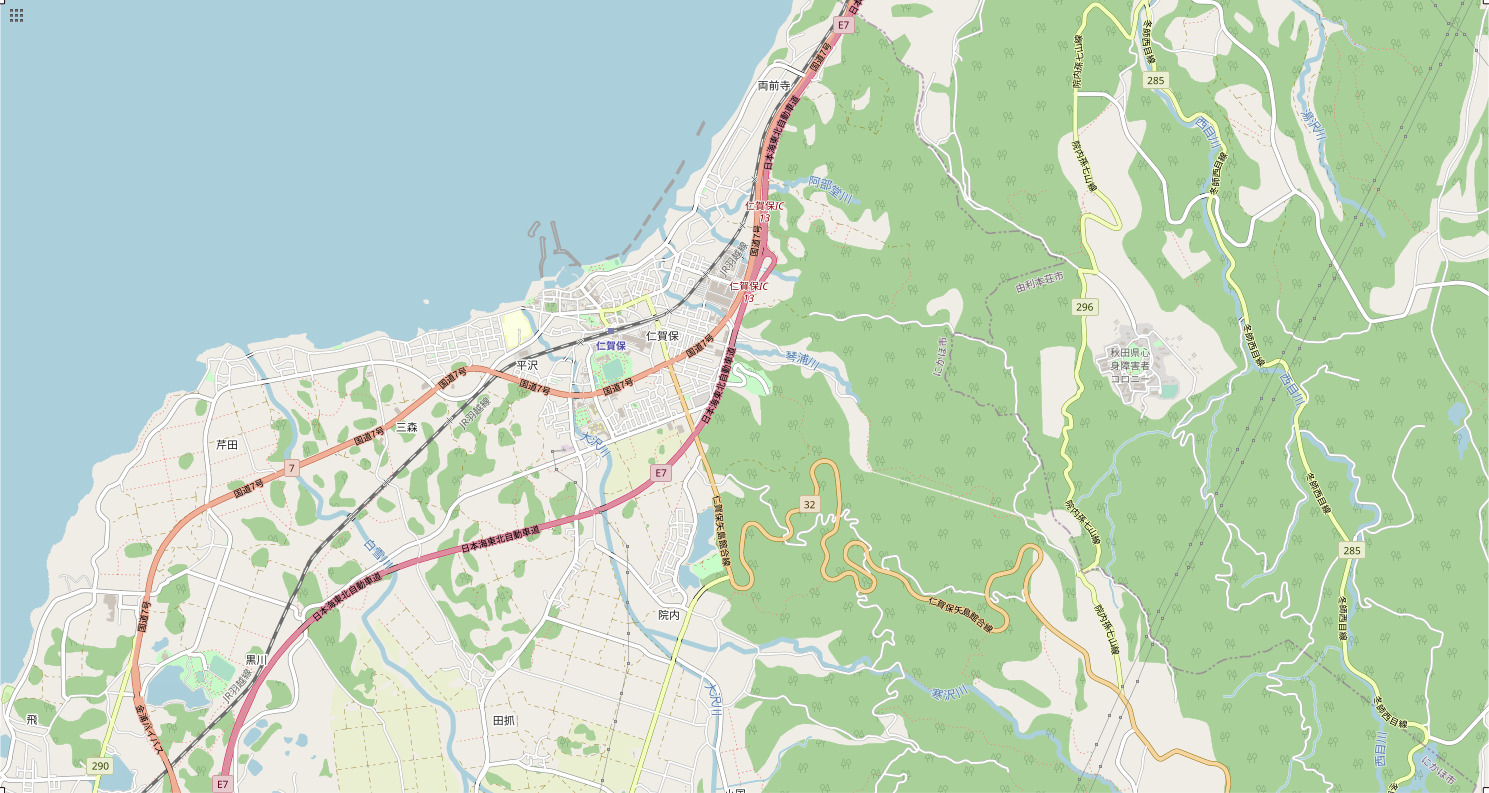
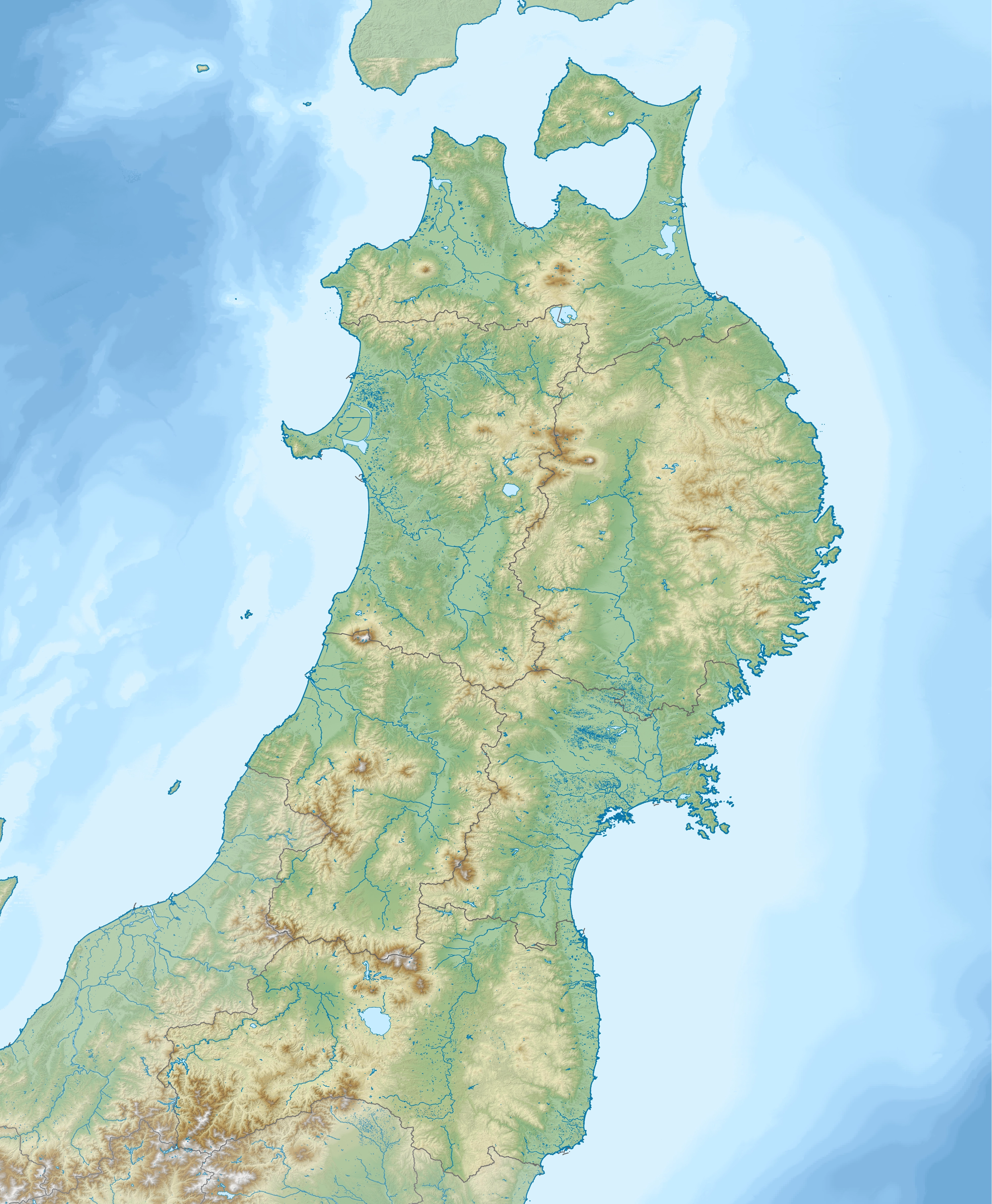
- Location within Nikaho, Akita Location within Akita Prefecture Location within Tohoku, Japan Location within Japan
- Interactive map of TDK Akita General Sports Center
- Full name: TDK Akita General Sports Center
- Address: 48-2, Hiraishi, Kurokawa, Nikaho, Akita
- Elevation: 24 m (79 ft)
- Owner: TDK
- Operator: TDK
- Surface: grass
- Field size: Baseball field: left - 95 m center - 120 m right - 95 m
- Acreage: Soccer field:21,500 sqm
- Public transit: JR Uetsu Main Line Konoura Station
- Parking: 100

Construction
- Built: 1985

Tenants
- TDK Baseball team TDK Shinwakai

TDK Akita General Sports Center is a group of sports facilities located in Nikaho, Akita, Japan. It opened in 1985 and hosted National Sports Festival of Japan soccer games in 2007. It is the former home ground of the TDK SC and adjacent to Shirase Antaractic Expedition Memorial Museum and Nankyoku Park.

== Facilities ==
- Soccer fields
- Baseball field
- Swimming pool
- Gymnasium
- Lodge にかほ市スポーツ宿泊研修センター (run by the city)
