= Naso Falls =

Naso no Shirataki Falls 奈曽の白滝
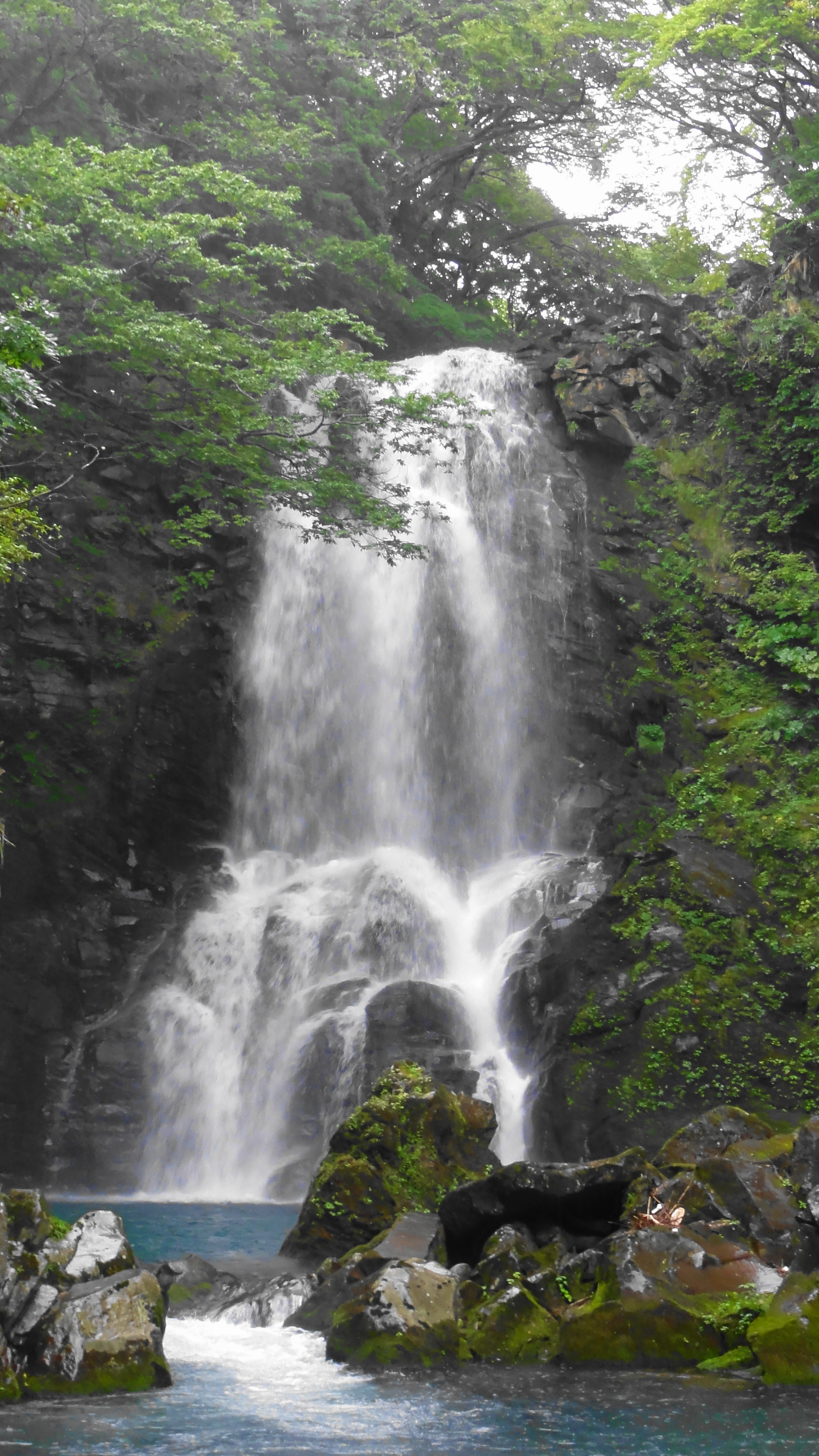

- Location within Akita Prefecture Location within Japan
- Location: Nikaho, Akita, Japan
- Coordinates: 39°10′53.2″N 139°56′35.7″E
- Total height: 26 m (85 ft)
- Average width: 11 m (36 ft)
- National Place of Scenic Beauty

Naso no Shirataki (奈曽の白滝, Naso no Shirataki) is a waterfall located in Nikaho, Akita Prefecture, Japan. It became a nationally designated Place of Scenic Beauty in 1932. Although not selected as one of "Japan’s Top 100 Waterfalls", it was included in the listing of the "100 New Tourist Attractions of Japan" in a contest sponsored by the Mainichi Shinbun newspaper in 1950.

== Overview ==
The falls are located within Chōkai Quasi-National Park at an altitude of 150 meters, on the upper reaches of the Naso River. The falls have a height of 26 metres (85 ft) and width of 11 metres (36 ft). The falls are located near a Shinto shrine, the Kinpo Jinja, which was founded in the early Heian period. It is connected to the shrine by a footpath.

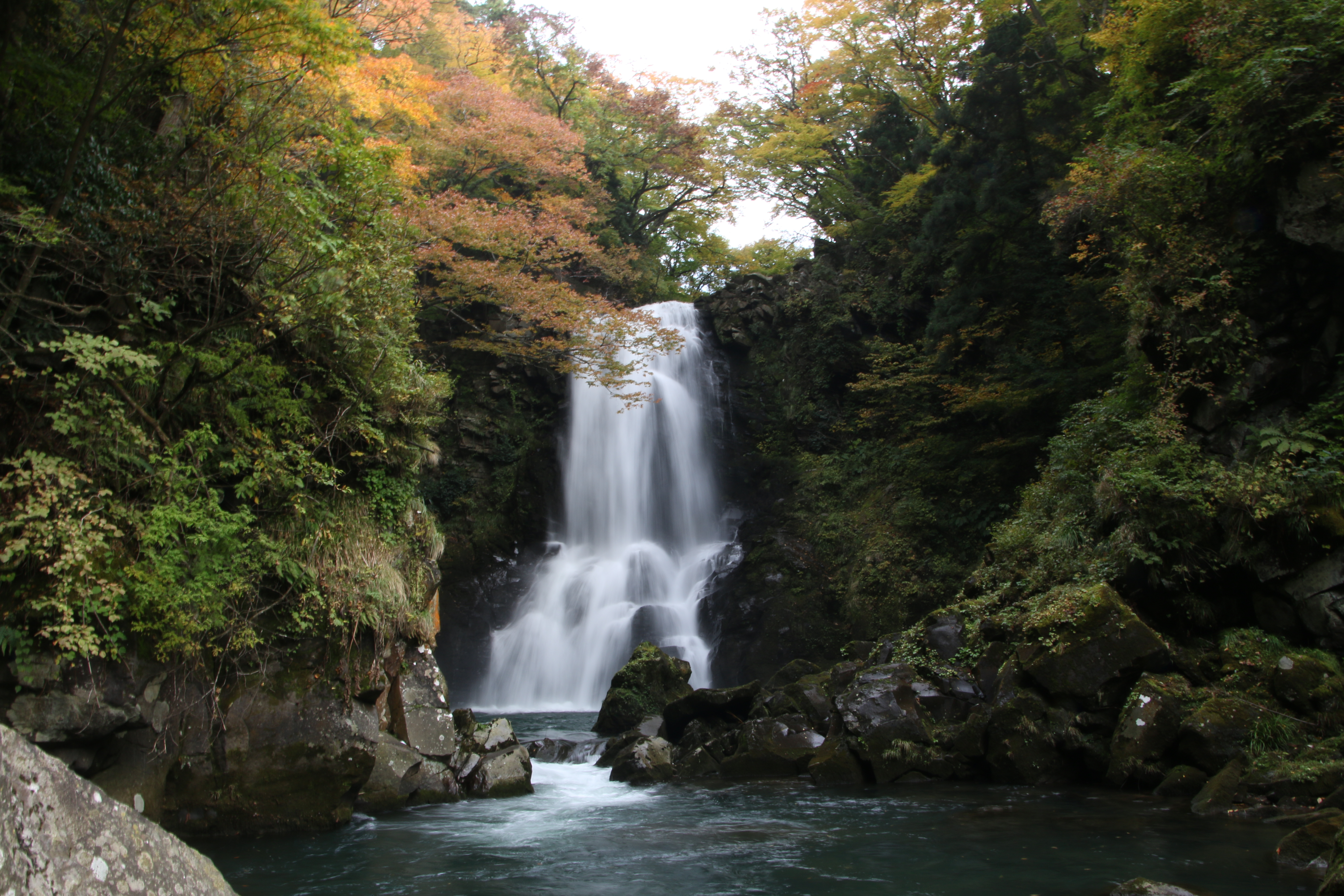
Panoramic view

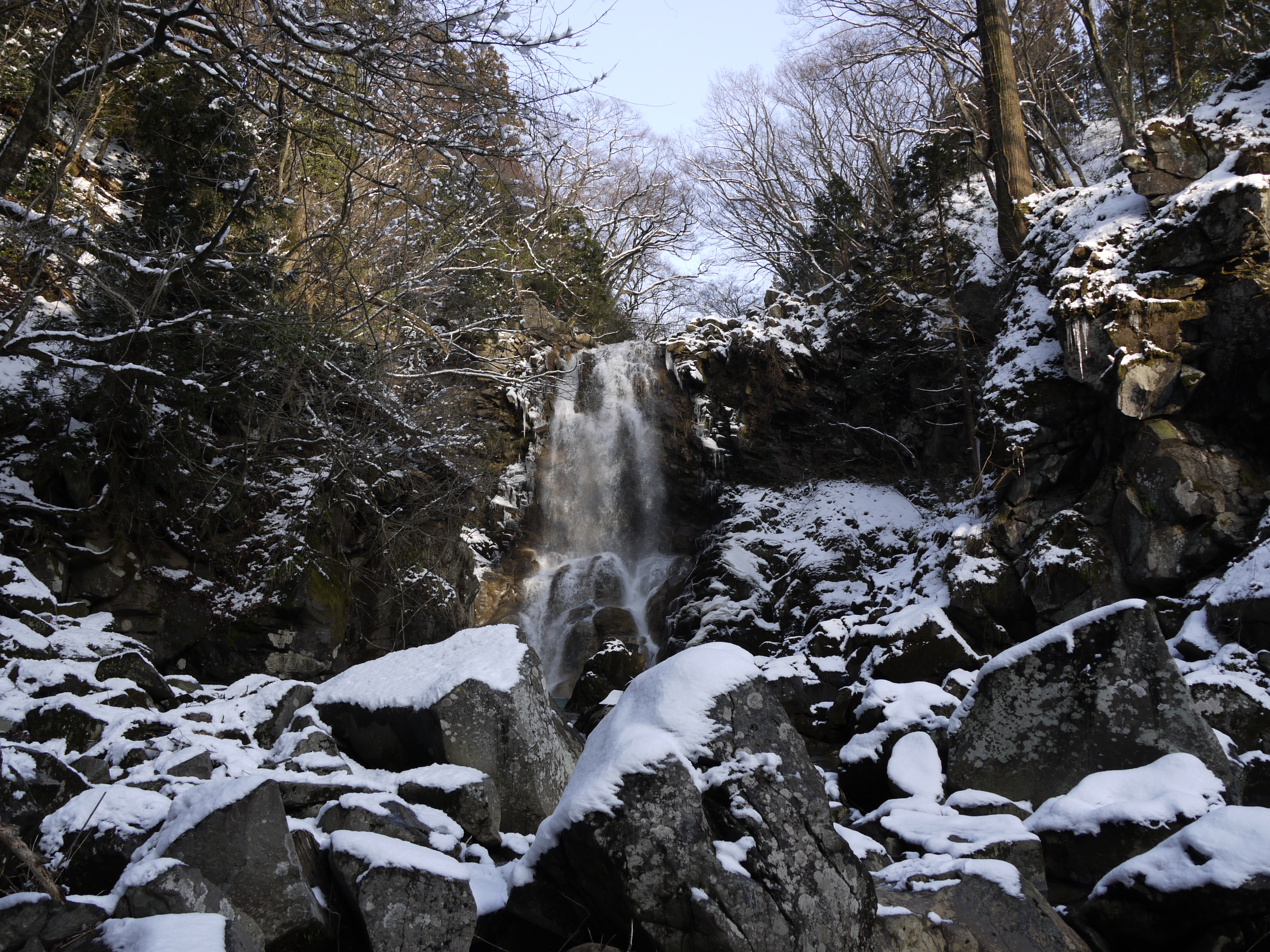
Falls in winter

== See also ==
- List of Places of Scenic Beauty of Japan (Akita)
