= Hinokinai River =

Hinokinai River (檜木内川, Hinokinaikawa) is a river in the city of Semboku, Akita Prefecture, Japan.

The Hinokinai River is a 33-kilometer long tributary of the Tanaga River, and flows through the Kakunodate neighborhood of the city of Semboku.

== Hinokinai River Embankment ==
Hinokinai River Embankment
- 檜木内川堤
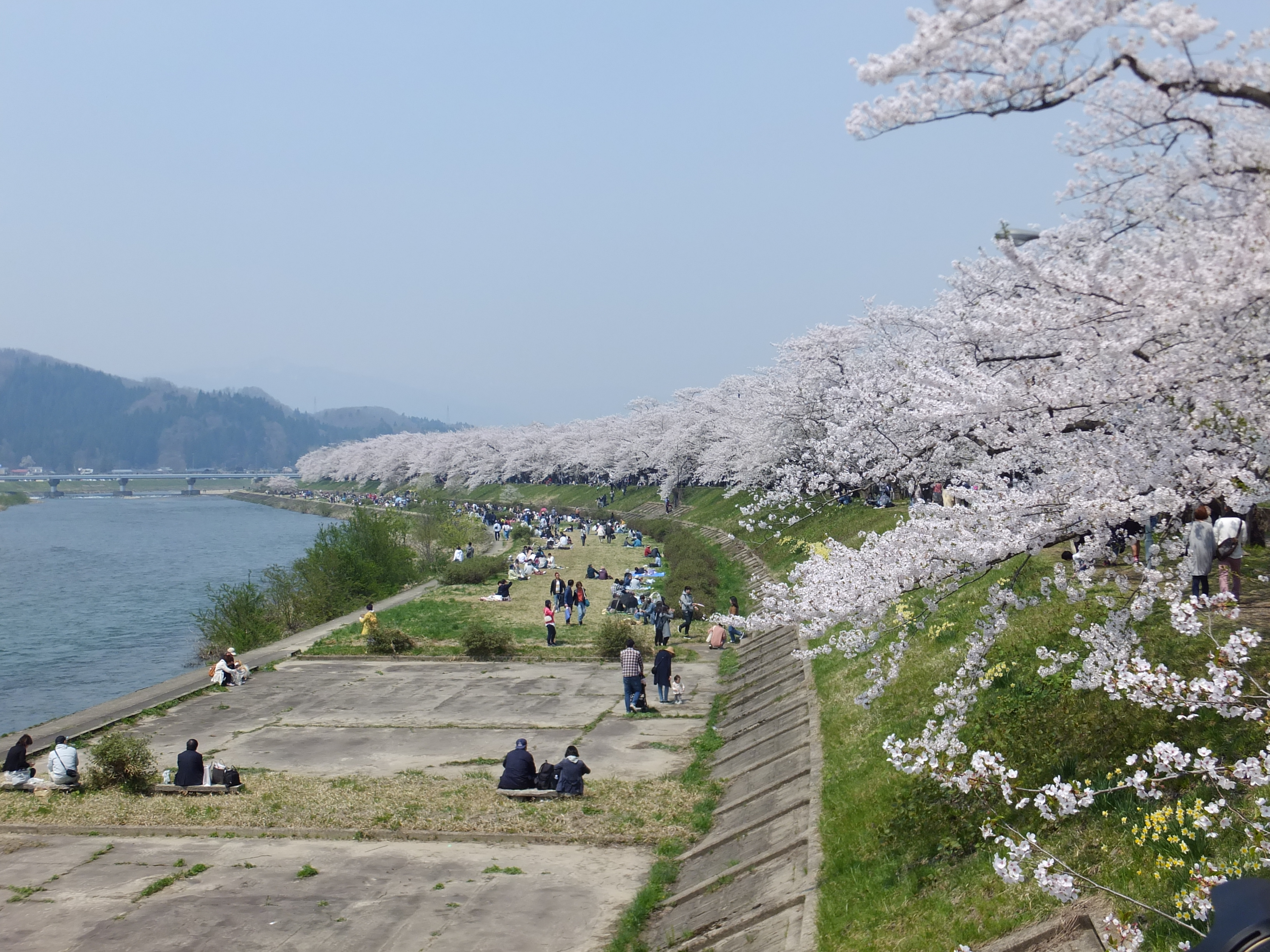
- Cherry blossom along the Hinokinai River

- Location within Akita Prefecture Location within Japan
- Type: Urban park
- Location: Semboku, Akita, Akita, Japan
- Coordinates: 39°36′03″N 140°33′28″E
- Created: 1934; 92 years ago
- Operator: Semboku city
- Status: Open
- National Palace of Scenic Beauty

Hinokinai River Embankment (檜木内川堤, Hinokinaikawa zutsumi) is a nationally designated Place of Scenic Beauty in the city of Semboku, Akita Prefecture, Japan.

The two kilometers of the river embankments were planted with hundreds of Somei Yoshino sakura trees in 1934 in commemoration of the birth of Emperor Heisei. Along with Kakunodate's famous samurai residence neighborhood, the cherry blossoms in spring are a major tourist attraction of the prefecture and in 1990 were selected as one of the "100 Best Cherry Blossom Spots in Japan" by the semi-governmental "Japan Sakura Association"

== Gallery ==
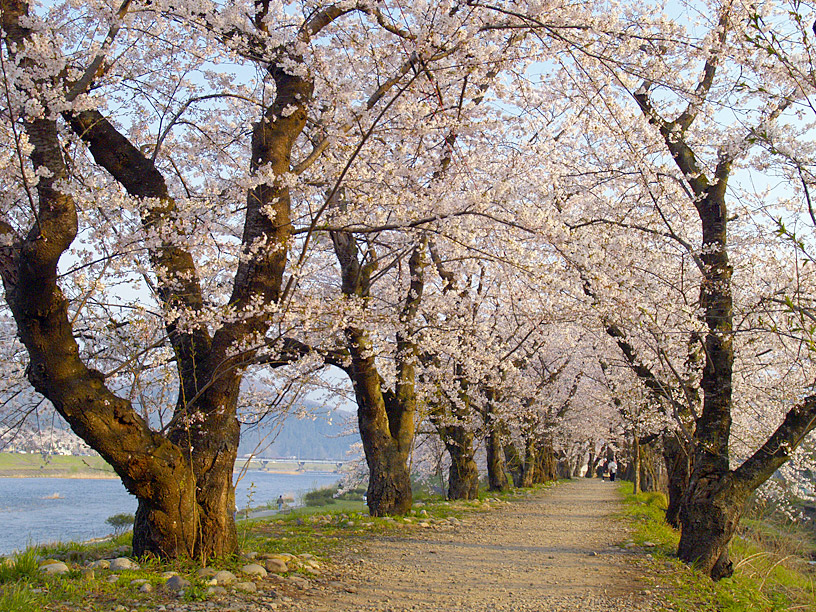

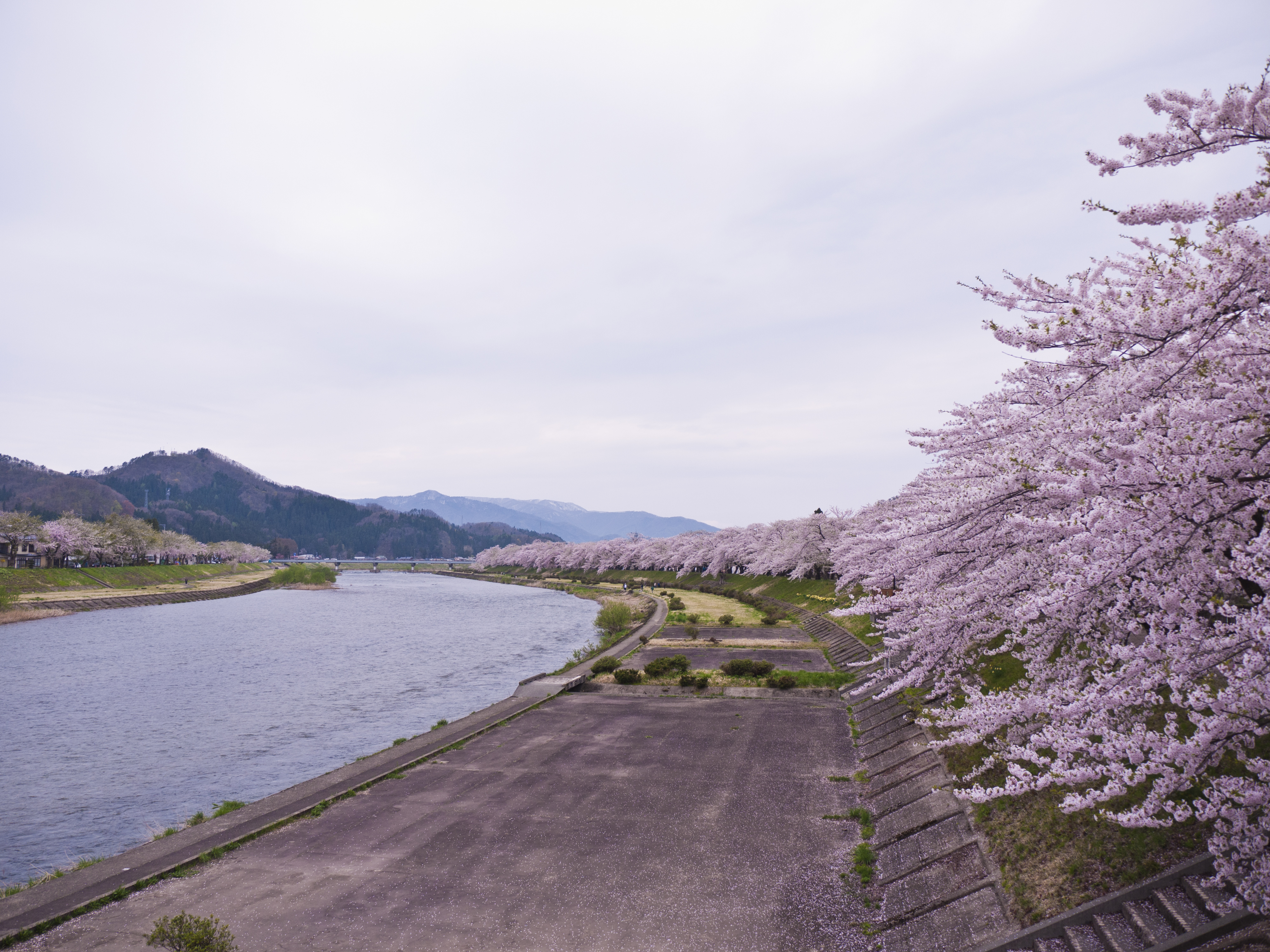

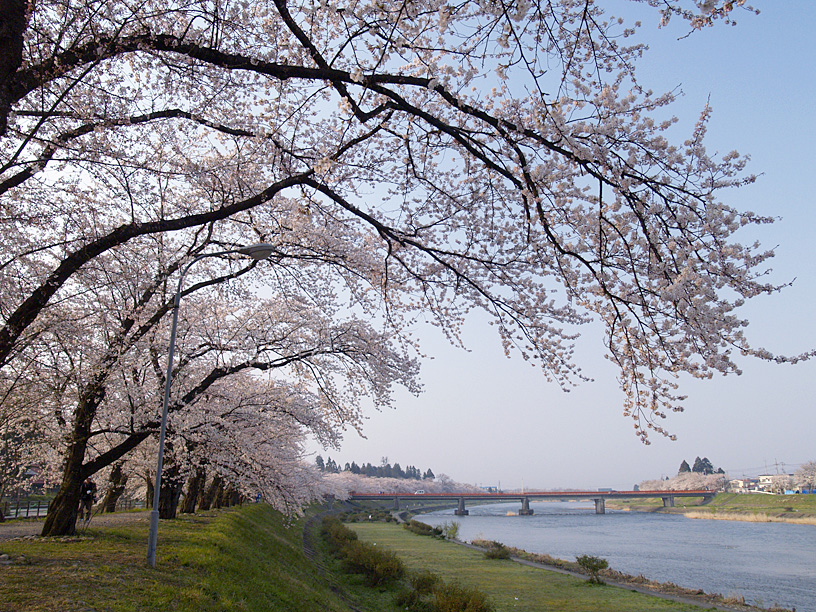

== See also ==
- List of Places of Scenic Beauty of Japan (Akita)
