= Mega Station (Yamagata) =

Railway station in Yuza, Yamagata Prefecture, Japan

Mega Station 女鹿駅
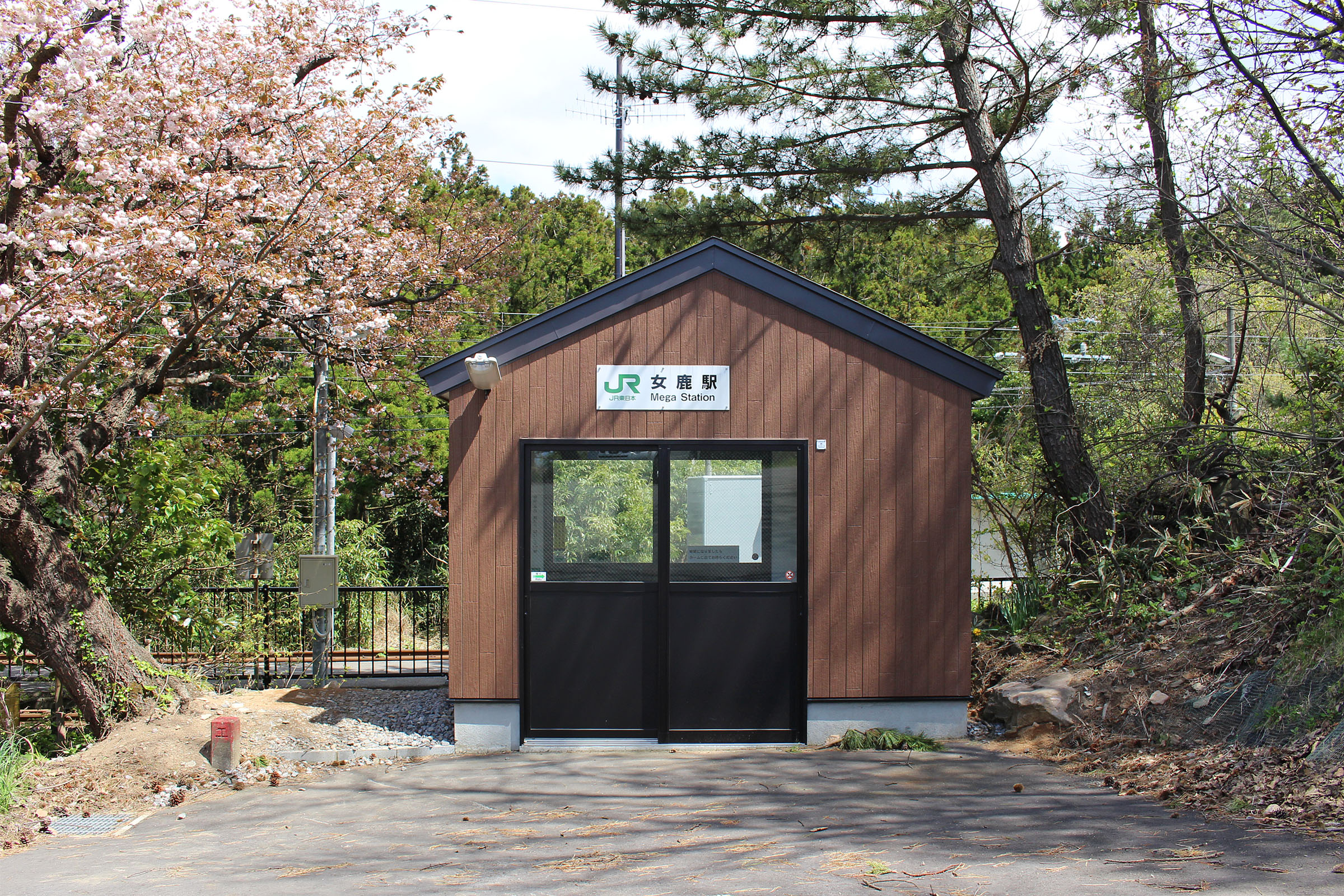
- Mega Station in May 2017

General information
- Location: Mega, Fukura, Yuza-machi, Akumi-gun, Yamagata-ken 999-8521; Japan
- Coordinates: 39°5′55.5″N 139°52′51.4″E
- Operator: JR East
- Line: ■ Uetsu Main Line
- Distance: 189.7 km from Niitsu
- Platforms: 2 side platforms
- Tracks: 2
- Connections: Bus stop

Other information
- Status: Unstaffed
- Website: Official website

History
- Opened: April 1, 1987

Passengers
- FY2004: 4

Services
Preceding station	JR East	Following station
Fukura towards Niitsu	Uetsu Main Line	Kosagawa towards Akita
Location
- Location within Yamagata Prefecture Location within Japan

Mega Station (女鹿駅, Mega eki) is a railway station in the town of Yuza, Yamagata Prefecture, Japan, operated by East Japan Railway Company (JR East).

== Lines ==
Mega Station is served by the Uetsu Main Line, and is located 189.7 kilometers from the starting point of the line at Niitsu Station.

== Station layout ==
The station has two opposed side platforms connected by a level crossing; however, only one platform is in use, with the other reserved for passage of express trains. The station is unattended.

=== Platforms ===
1	■ Uetsu Main Line	for Tsuruoka and Sakata for Ugo-Honjō and Akita
2	■ Uetsu Main Line	for through trains

== History ==
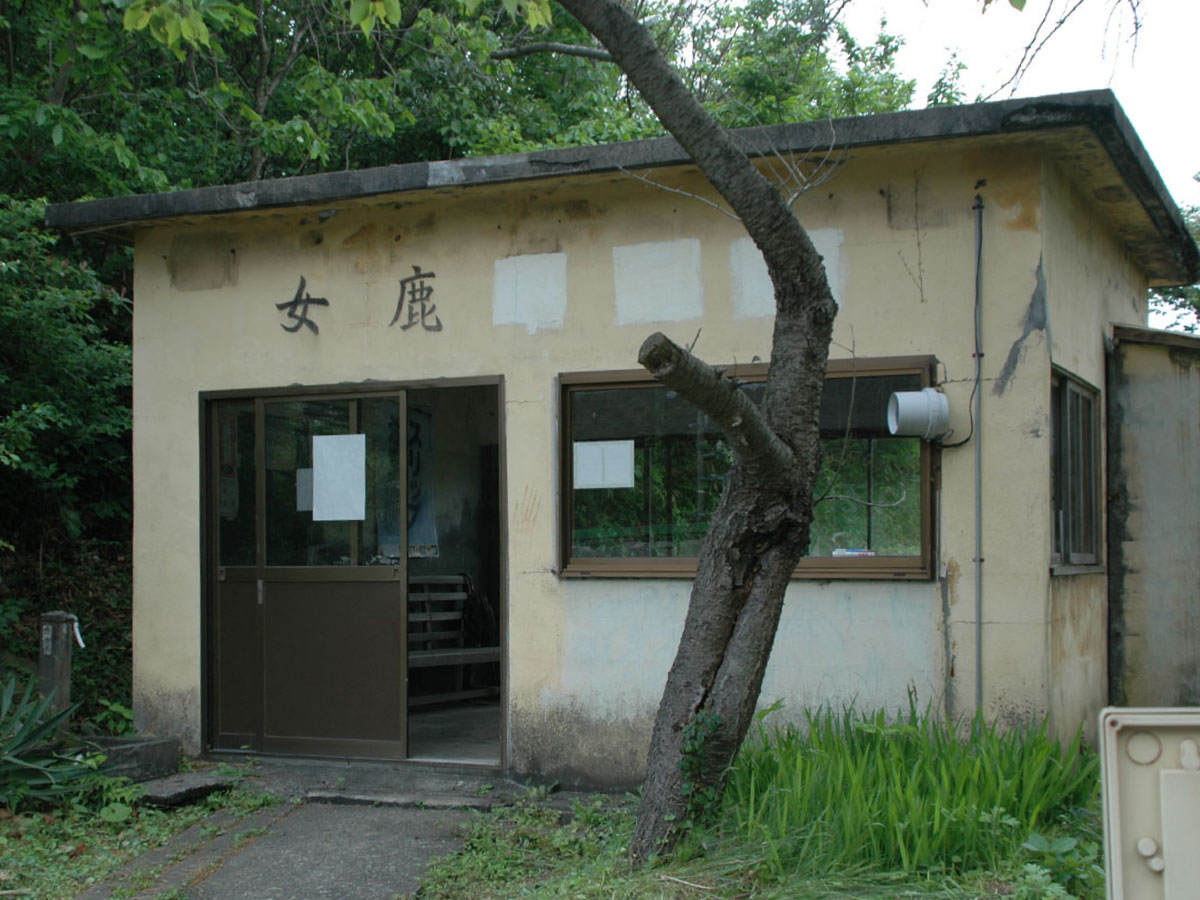
The station in May 2007

The station opened on April 1, 1987.

== Surrounding area ==
- Misaki Park
- National Route 7
- National Route 345

== See also ==
- List of railway stations in Japan
