= Kosagawa Station =

Railway station in Nikaho, Akita Prefecture, Japan

Kosagawa Station 小砂川駅
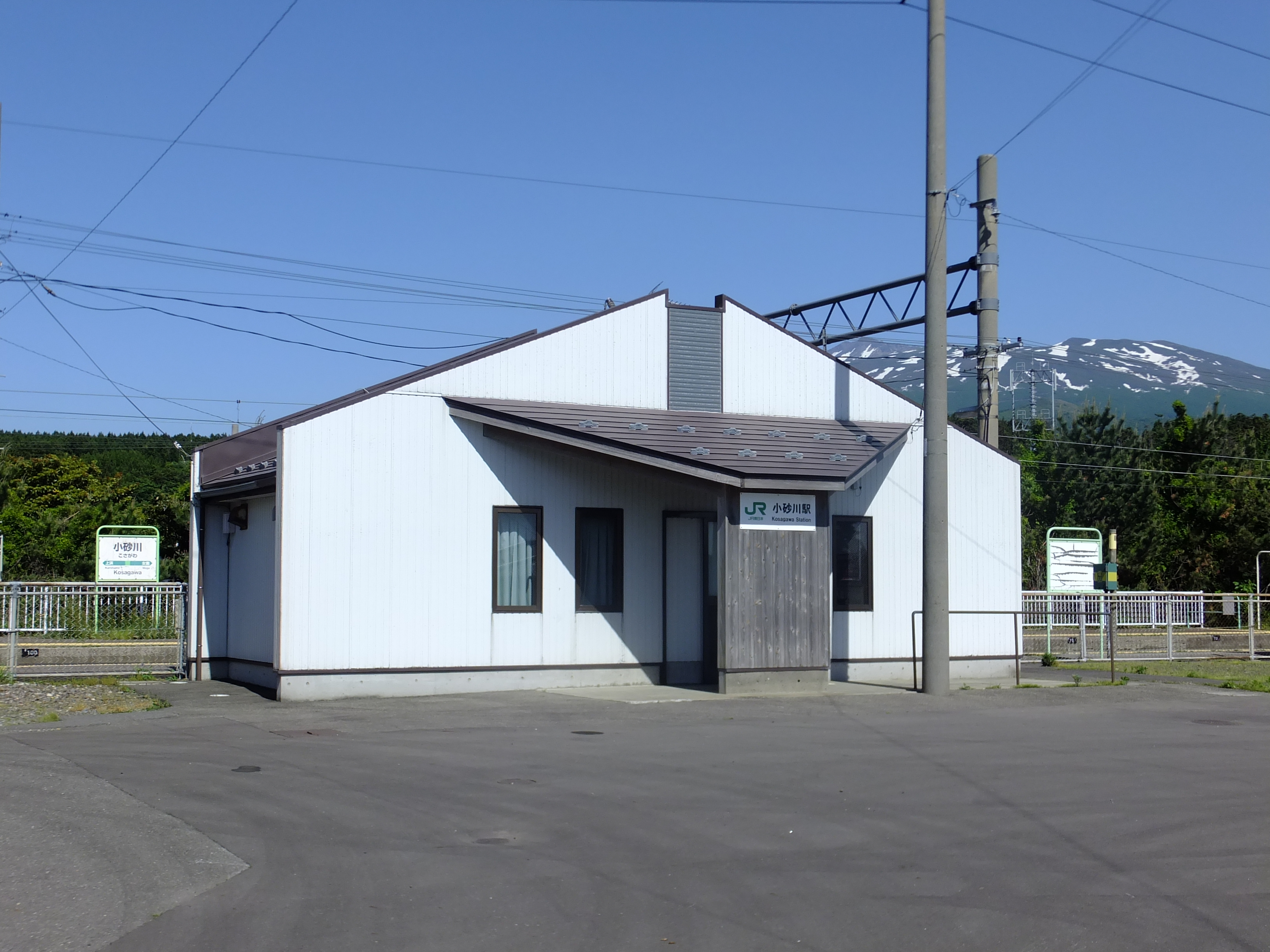
- Kosagawa Station in May 2018

General information
- Location: 9-9 Oda Kosagawa, Kisakata-machi, Nikaho-shi, Akita-ken 018-0143; Japan
- Coordinates: 39°8′15.6″N 139°53′8.3″E
- Operator: JR East
- Line: ■ Uetsu Main Line
- Distance: 194.8 kilometers from Niitsu
- Platforms: 2 side platforms

Other information
- Status: Unstaffed
- Website: Official website

History
- Opened: November 15, 1921

Passengers
- FY2014: 29 daily

Services
Preceding station	JR East	Following station
Mega towards Niitsu	Uetsu Main Line	Kamihama towards Akita
Location
- Location within Akita Prefecture Location within Japan

Kosagawa Station (小砂川駅, Kosagawa eki) is a railway station in the city of Nikaho, Akita, Japan, operated by JR East.

== Lines ==
Kosagawa Station is served by the Uetsu Main Line, and is located 194.8 km from the terminus of the line at Niitsu Station.

== Station layout ==
The station consists of two opposed side platforms connected to the station building by a footbridge. The station is unattended.

=== Platforms ===
1	■ Uetsu Main Line	for Ugo-Honjō and Akita
2	■ Uetsu Main Line	for Tsuruoka and Sakata

== History ==
Kosakawa Station opened on November 15, 1921, as a station on the Japanese Government Railways (JGR) Rikuusai Line. It was switched to the control of the JGR Uetsu Main Line on April 20, 1924. The JGR became the JNR (Japan National Railway) after World War II. With the privatization of the JNR on April 1, 1987, the station came under the control of the East Japan Railway Company.

== Passenger statistics ==
In fiscal 2014, the station was used by an average of 29 passengers daily (boarding passengers only).

== Surrounding area ==
National Route 7
