= Kisakata Station =

Railway station in Nikaho, Akita Prefecture, Japan

Kisakata Station 象潟駅
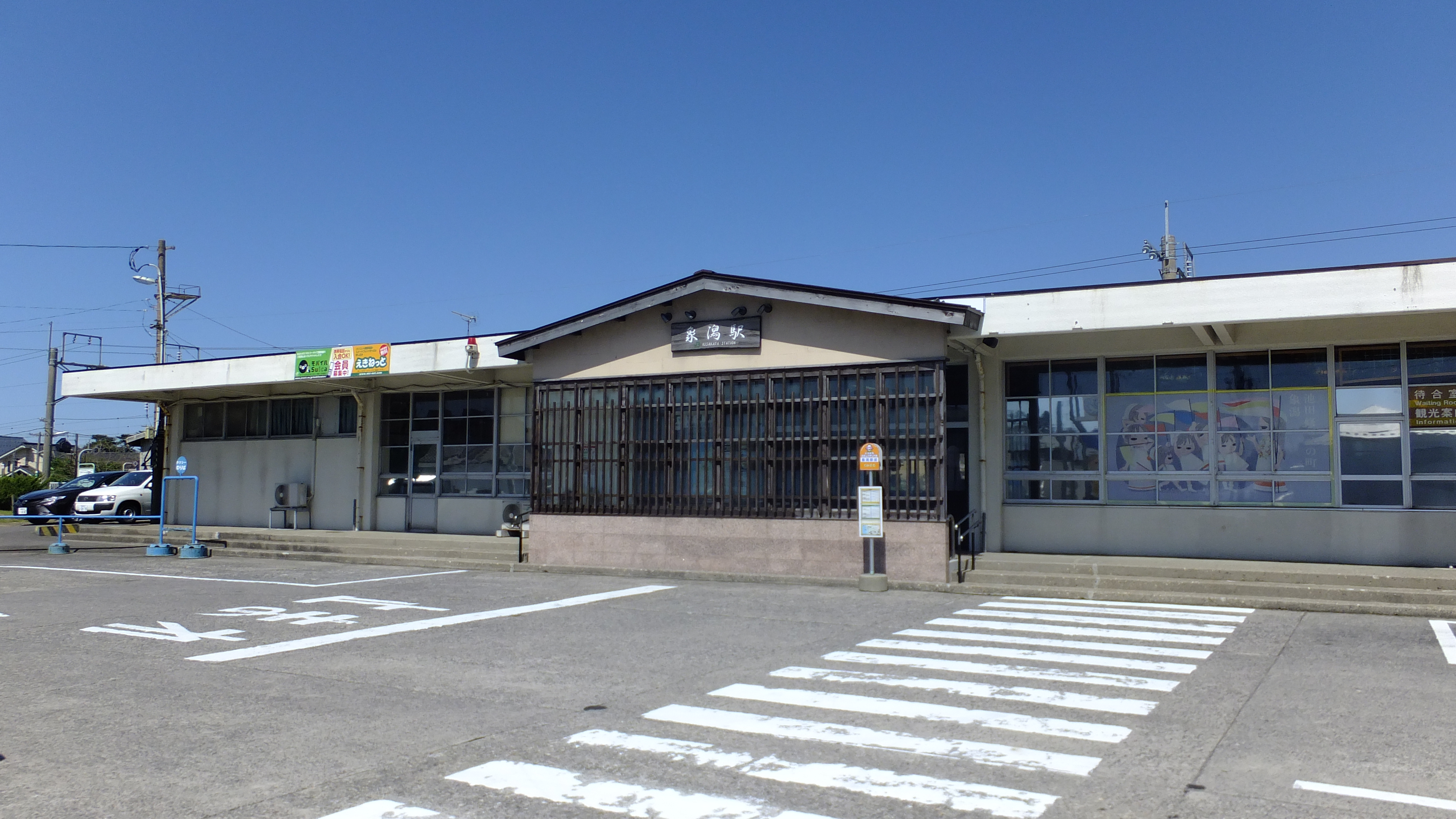
- Kisakata Station in May 2018

General information
- Location: 23 Ie-no-ushiro, Kisakata, Nikaho-shi, Akita-ken 018-0112; Japan
- Coordinates: 39°12′25.8″N 139°54′7.4″E
- Operator: JR East
- Line: ■ Uetsu Main Line
- Distance: 203.4 kilometers from Niitsu
- Platforms: 1 side + 1 island platforms

Other information
- Status: Staffed
- Website: Official website

History
- Opened: November 15, 1921

Passengers
- FY2018: 191 daily

Services
Preceding station	JR East	Following station
Yuza towards Niigata	Inaho	Nikaho towards Akita
Kamihama towards Niitsu	Uetsu Main Line	Konoura towards Akita
Location
- Location within Akita Prefecture Location within Japan

Kisakata Station (象潟駅, Kisakata eki) is a railway station in the city of Nikaho, Akita, Japan, operated by JR East.

== Lines ==
Kisakata Station is served by the Uetsu Main Line, and is located 203.4 km from the terminus of the line at Niitsu Station.

== Station layout ==
The station consists of one side platform and one island platform connected to the station building by a footbridge. The station is staffed.

=== Platforms ===
1	■ Uetsu Main Line	for Ugo-Honjō and Akita
2	■ Uetsu Main Line	for Niigata and Sakata
3	■ Uetsu Main Line	passing track

== History ==
Kisakata Station opened on November 15, 1921 as a station on the Japanese Government Railways (JGR) Rikuusai Line. It was switched to the control of the JGR Uetsu Main Line on April 20, 1924. The JGR became the JNR (Japan National Railway) after World War II. A new station building was completed in November 1966. With the privatization of the JNR on April 1, 1987, the station came under the control of the East Japan Railway Company. The station was renovated in October 2012.

== Passenger statistics ==
In fiscal 2018, the station was used by an average of 191 passengers daily (boarding passengers only).

== Surrounding area ==
- Nikaho City Hall

National Route 7
