= Kamihama Station =

Railway station in Nikaho, Akita Prefecture, Japan

Kamihama Station 上浜駅
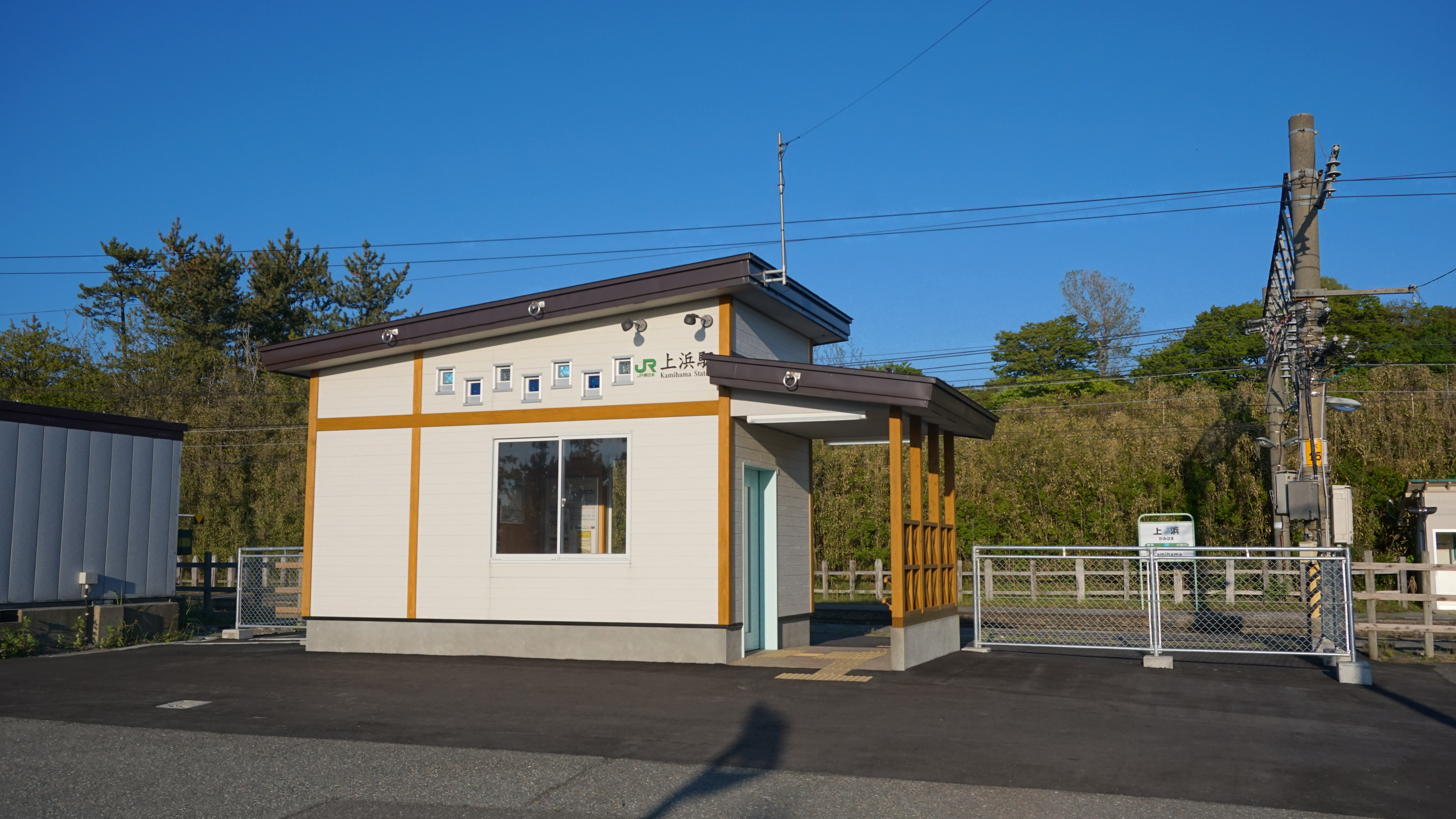
- Kamihama Station in May 2019

General information
- Location: Sunayama-4 Kisakatamachi Araigama, Nikaho-shi, Akita-ken 018-0135; Japan
- Coordinates: 39°9′53″N 139°54′10.1″E
- Operator: JR East
- Line: ■ Uetsu Main Line
- Distance: 198.5 kilometers from Niitsu
- Platforms: 2 side platforms

Other information
- Status: Unstaffed
- Website: Official website

History
- Opened: March 1, 1952

Passengers
- FY2014: 18 daily

Services
Preceding station	JR East	Following station
Kosagawa towards Niitsu	Uetsu Main Line	Kisakata towards Akita
Location
- Location within Akita Prefecture Location within Japan

Kamihama Station (上浜駅, Kamihama eki) is a railway station in the city of Nikaho, Akita, Japan, operated by JR East.

== Lines ==
Kamihama Station is served by the Uetsu Main Line, and is located 198.5 km from the terminus of the line at Niitsu Station.

== Station layout ==
The station consists of two opposed side platforms connected to the station building by a footbridge. The station is unattended.

=== Platforms ===
1	■ Uetsu Main Line	for Ugo-Honjō and Akita
2	■ Uetsu Main Line	for Tsuruoka and Sakata

== History ==
Kamihama Station opened on March 1, 1952 as a station on the JNR (Japan National Railway). With the privatization of the JNR on April 1, 1987, the station came under the control of the East Japan Railway Company.

== Passenger statistics ==
In fiscal 2014, the station was used by an average of 18 passengers daily (boarding passengers only).

== Surrounding area ==
National Route 7
