= Nikaho Station =

Railway station in Nikaho, Akita Prefecture, Japan

Nikaho Station 仁賀保駅
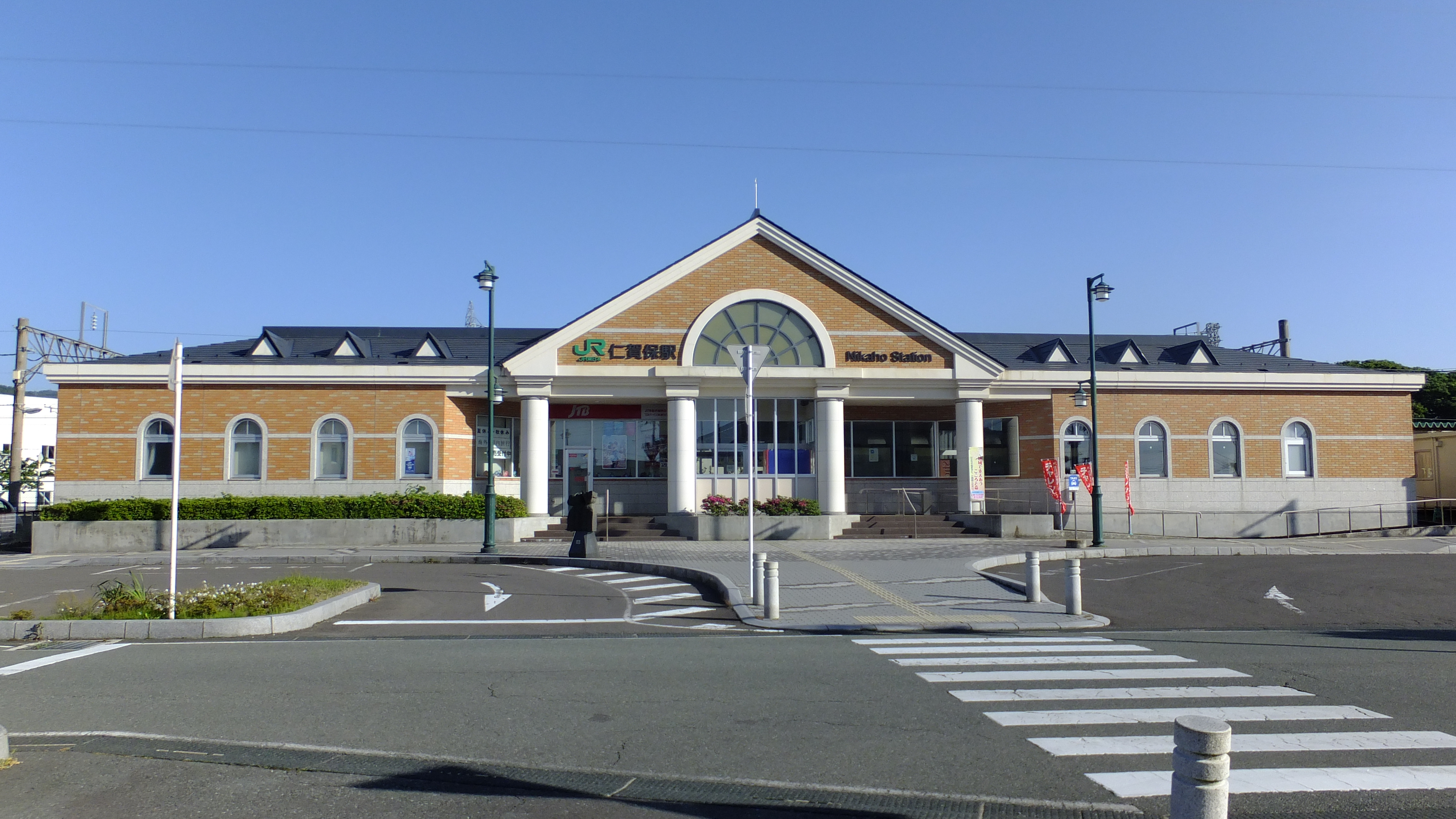
- Nikaho Station in May 2018

General information
- Location: Shimizu-18-3 Hirasawa, Nikaho-shi, Akita-ken 018-0402; Japan
- Coordinates: 39.289836°N 139.963992°E
- Operator: JR East
- Line: ■ Uetsu Main Line
- Distance: 214.7 kilometers from Niitsu
- Platforms: 1 side +1 island platform

Other information
- Status: Staffed
- Website: Official website

History
- Opened: June 30, 1922
- Former names: Ugo-Hirasawa (until 1968)

Passengers
- FY2018: 261 daily

Services
Preceding station	JR East	Following station
Kisakata towards Niigata	Inaho	Ugo-Honjō towards Akita
Konoura towards Niitsu	Uetsu Main Line	Nishime towards Akita
Location
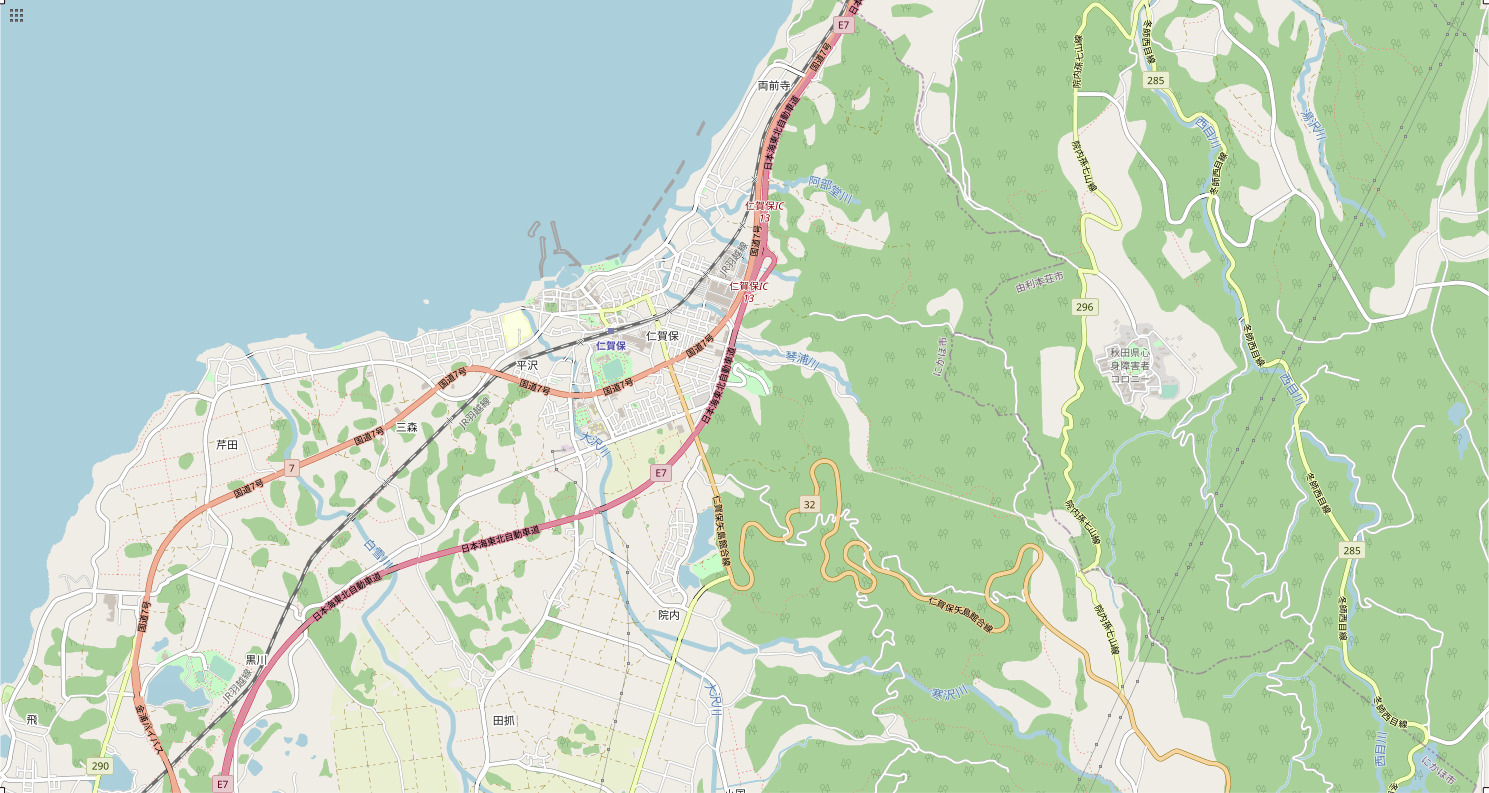
- Location within Nikaho, Akita Location within Akita Prefecture Location within Japan

Nikaho Station (仁賀保駅, Nikaho eki) is a railway station in the city of Nikaho, Akita, Japan, operated by JR East.

== Lines ==
Nikaho Station is served by the Uetsu Main Line, and is located 214.7 km from the terminus of the line at Niitsu Station.

== Station layout ==
The station consists of one side platform and one island platform connected to the station building by a footbridge. The station is attended.

=== Platforms ===
1	■ Uetsu Main Line	for Ugo-Honjō and Akita
2	■ Uetsu Main Line	for Kisakata and Sakata
3	■ Uetsu Main Line	passing track

== History ==
The station opened on June 30, 1922 as Ugo-Hirasawa Station (羽後平沢駅) on the Japanese Government Railways (JGR) Rikuusai Line. The station was renamed Nikaho Station on April 1, 1968. With the privatization of JNR on April 1, 1987, the station came under the control of JR East. A new station building was completed in June 2001.

== Passenger statistics ==
In fiscal 2018, the station was used by an average of 261 passengers daily (boarding passengers only).

== Surrounding area ==
- Nikaho city office
- Nikaho Post office
- TDK Hirasawa Plant
- Nikaho Green Field
