= Konoura Station =

Railway station in Nikaho, Akita Prefecture, Japan

Konoura Station 金浦駅
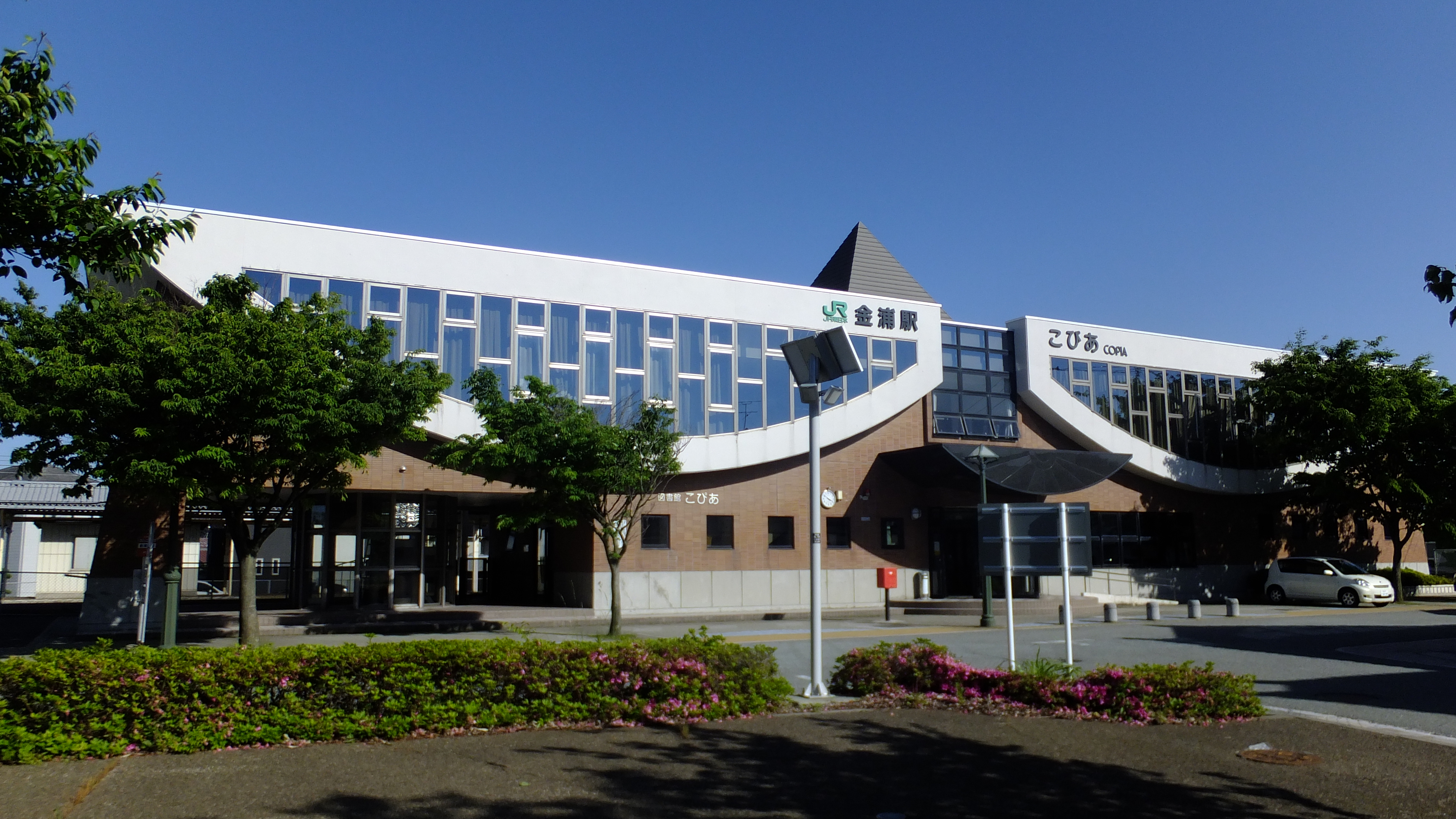
- Konoura Station in May 2018

General information
- Location: 94 Jūnibayashi Konoura, Nikaho-shi, Akita-ken 018-0311; Japan
- Coordinates: 39°15′21.3″N 139°55′12.9″E
- Operator: JR East
- Line: ■ Uetsu Main Line
- Distance: 209.2 kilometers from Niitsu
- Platforms: 1 side + an island platform

Other information
- Status: Staffed
- Website: Official website

History
- Opened: June 30, 1922

Passengers
- FY2018: 190 daily

Services
Preceding station	JR East	Following station
Kisakata towards Niitsu	Uetsu Main Line	Nikaho towards Akita
Location
- Location within Akita Prefecture Location within Japan

Konoura Station (金浦駅, Konoura eki) is a railway station in the city of Nikaho, Akita, Japan, operated by JR East.

== Lines ==
Konoura Station is served by the Uetsu Main Line, and is located 209.2 km from the terminus of the line at Niitsu Station.

== Station layout ==
The station consists of one side platform and one island platform connected to the station building by a footbridge. The station is staffed. The station building also includes the Nikaho City Library.

=== Platforms ===
1	■ Uetsu Main Line	for Ugo-Honjō and Akita
2	■ Uetsu Main Line	for Kisakata and Sakata
3	■ Uetsu Main Line	passing track

== History ==
Konoura Station opened on June 30, 1922 as a station on the Japanese Government Railways (JGR) Rikuusai Line. It was switched to the control of the JGR Uetsu Main Line on April 20, 1924. The JGR became the JNR (Japan National Railway) after World War II. With the privatization of the JNR on April 1, 1987, the station came under the control of the East Japan Railway Company.

== Passenger statistics ==
In fiscal 2018, the station was used by an average of 190 passengers daily (boarding passengers only).

== Surrounding area ==
- Shirase Antarctic Expedition Memorial Museum

National Route 7
