= Nikaho =

Nikaho にかほ市
- City
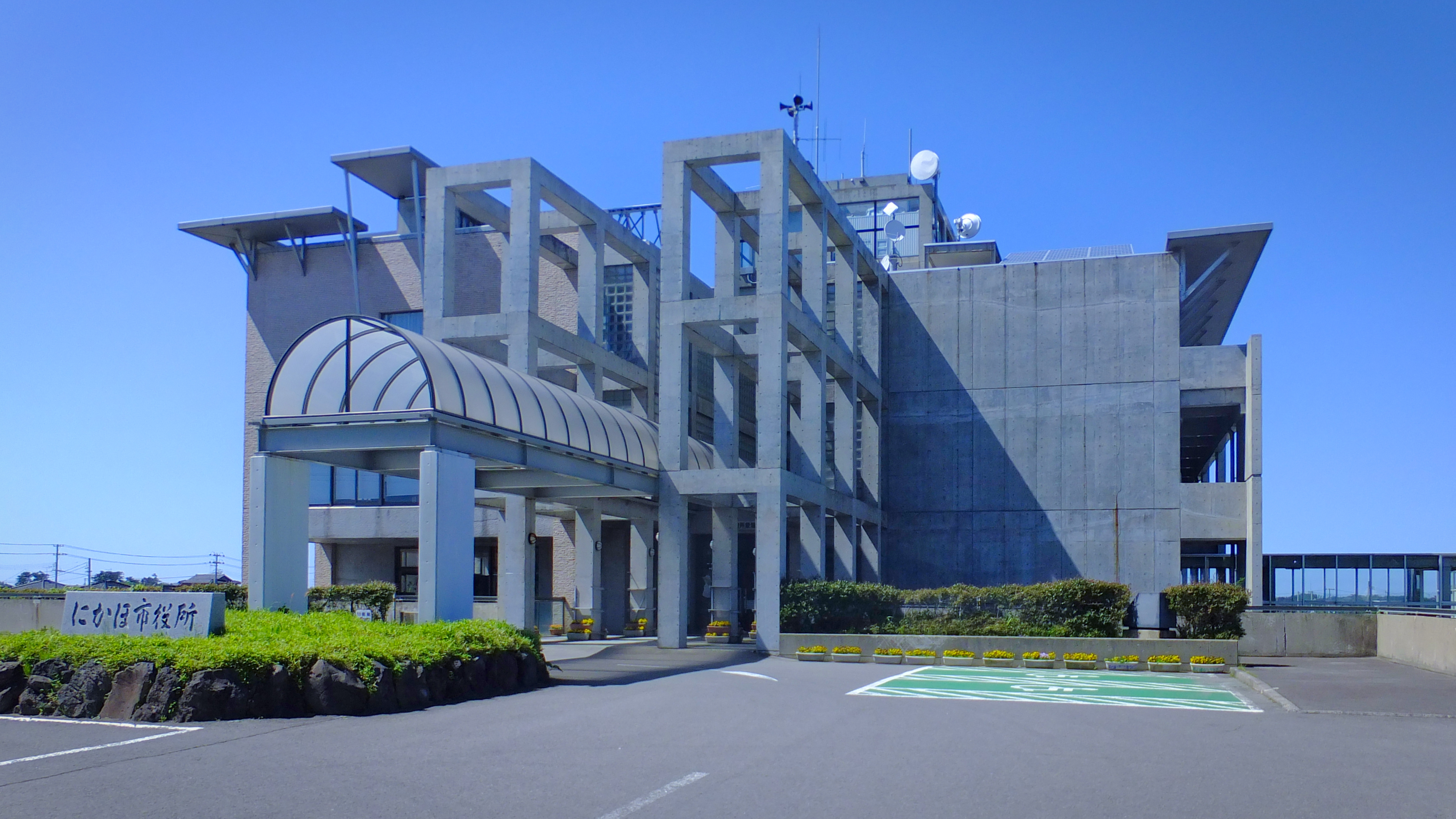
- Nikaho City Hall

- Flag Seal
- Location of Nikaho in Akita Prefecture

- Coordinates: 39°12′10.8″N 139°54′27.9″E
- Country: Japan
- Region: Tōhoku
- Prefecture: Akita

Area
  - Total: 241.13 km^{2} (93.10 sq mi)

Population (February 28, 2023)
  - Total: 22,958
  - Density: 95.210/km^{2} (246.59/sq mi)
- Time zone: UTC+9 (Japan Standard Time)
- Phone number: 0184-43-3200
- Address: 1 Aza-Hamanota, Kisakatamachi, Nikaho-shi 018-0113
- Climate: Cfa
- Website: Official website
- Symbols
- Bird: sea cormorant
- Fish: Gadidae
- Flower: silk tree
- Tree: Sugi

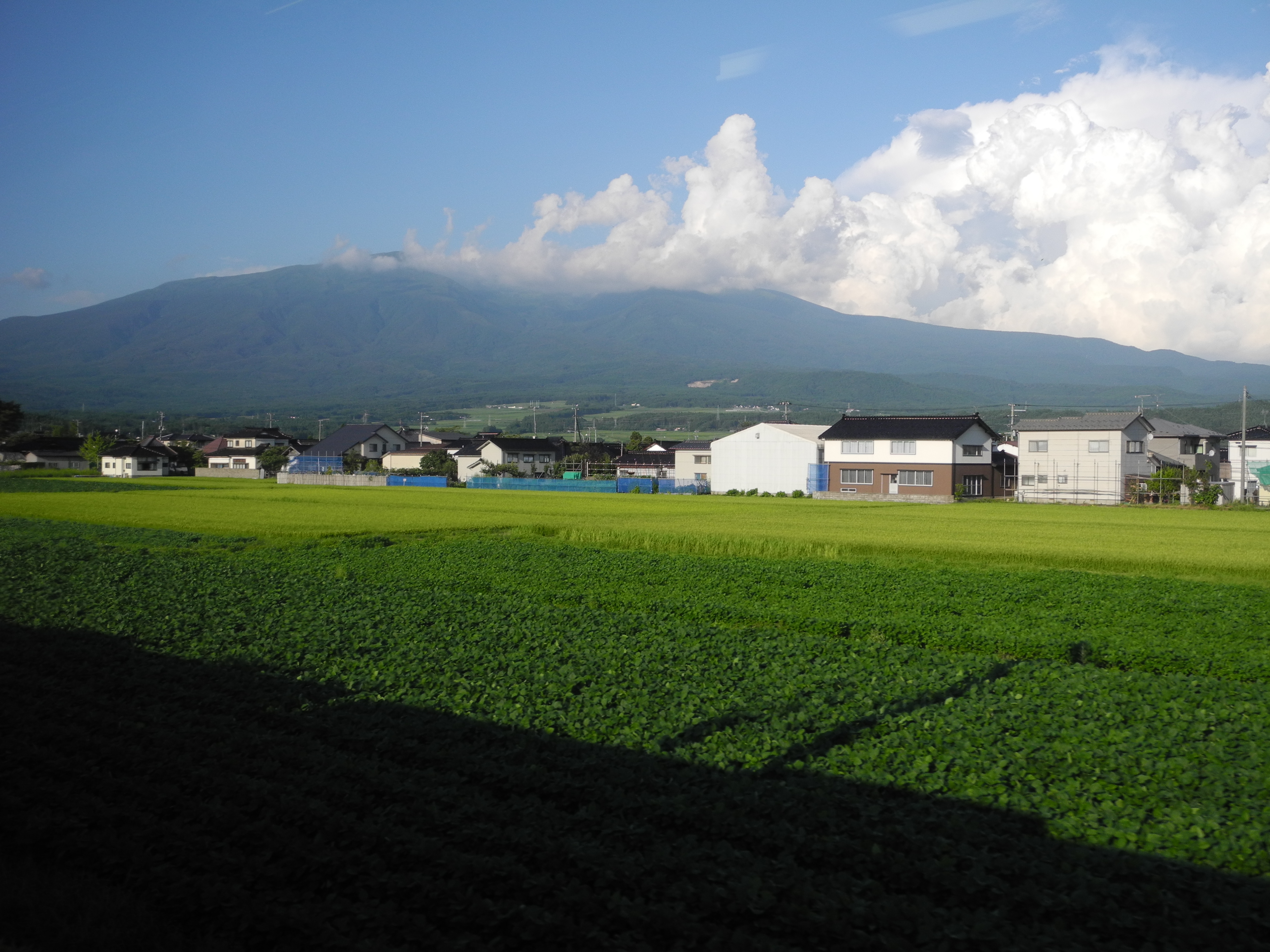
Nikaho and Mount Chōkai

Nikaho (にかほ市, Nikaho-shi) is a city located in Akita Prefecture, Japan. As of 28 February 2023, the city had an estimated population of 22,958 in 9388 households, and a population density of 95 persons per km^{2}. The total area of the city is 241.13 square kilometres (93.10 sq mi).

== Geography ==
Nikaho is located at the far southwest corner of Akita Prefecture, bordered by the Sea of Japan to the west, and by Yamagata Prefecture to the south. Part of the city is within the borders of the Chōkai Quasi-National Park.

=== Neighboring municipalities ===
Akita Prefecture

- Yurihonjō

Yamagata Prefecture

- Yuza

=== Climate ===
Nikaho has a humid subtropical climate (Köppen climate classification Cfa) with large seasonal temperature differences, with warm to hot (and often humid) summers and cold (sometimes severely cold) winters. Precipitation is significant throughout the year, but is heaviest from August to October. The average annual temperature in Nikaho is 13.0 °C. The average annual rainfall is 1877 mm with September as the wettest month. The temperatures are highest on average in August, at around 24.4 °C, and lowest in January, at around -0.9 °C.

Climate data for Nikaho (elevation 7 m, 1991–2020 normals, extremes 1976–present)
Month	Jan	Feb	Mar	Apr	May	Jun	Jul	Aug	Sep	Oct	Nov	Dec	Year
Record high °C (°F)	16.5 (61.7)	20.0 (68.0)	23.3 (73.9)	28.8 (83.8)	29.1 (84.4)	34.4 (93.9)	37.4 (99.3)	38.1 (100.6)	38.2 (100.8)	32.3 (90.1)	27.3 (81.1)	21.7 (71.1)	38.2 (100.8)
Mean daily maximum °C (°F)	5.1 (41.2)	5.4 (41.7)	8.4 (47.1)	13.8 (56.8)	18.9 (66.0)	22.7 (72.9)	26.4 (79.5)	28.7 (83.7)	25.3 (77.5)	19.6 (67.3)	13.8 (56.8)	8.2 (46.8)	16.4 (61.5)
Daily mean °C (°F)	2.5 (36.5)	2.6 (36.7)	5.2 (41.4)	10.0 (50.0)	15.1 (59.2)	19.3 (66.7)	23.3 (73.9)	25.1 (77.2)	21.5 (70.7)	15.9 (60.6)	10.3 (50.5)	5.2 (41.4)	13.0 (55.4)
Mean daily minimum °C (°F)	−0.2 (31.6)	−0.3 (31.5)	1.7 (35.1)	5.8 (42.4)	11.3 (52.3)	15.8 (60.4)	20.3 (68.5)	21.6 (70.9)	17.7 (63.9)	11.8 (53.2)	6.4 (43.5)	2.0 (35.6)	9.5 (49.1)
Record low °C (°F)	−7.6 (18.3)	−8.7 (16.3)	−5.8 (21.6)	−2.4 (27.7)	3.6 (38.5)	7.2 (45.0)	12.0 (53.6)	12.7 (54.9)	8.8 (47.8)	3.1 (37.6)	−4.5 (23.9)	−6.4 (20.5)	−8.7 (16.3)
Average precipitation mm (inches)	126.8 (4.99)	87.6 (3.45)	90.3 (3.56)	86.4 (3.40)	93.8 (3.69)	105.9 (4.17)	166.5 (6.56)	160.1 (6.30)	152.4 (6.00)	166.5 (6.56)	175.3 (6.90)	169.8 (6.69)	1,567.9 (61.73)
Average precipitation days (≥ 1.0 mm)	22.3	18.0	15.8	12.0	11.1	10.0	12.4	10.4	12.5	14.5	19.0	23.1	180.3
Mean monthly sunshine hours	33.2	56.4	115.3	175.9	196.6	178.8	161.8	199.0	154.5	132.6	80.5	39.7	1,532.1
Source: Japan Meteorological Agency (1991–2020 normals, extremes 1976–present)

== Demographics ==
Per Japanese census data, the population of Nikaho has been declining over the past 30 years.

Historical population

Year	Pop.	±% p.a.
1920	20,229	—
1930	22,958	+1.27%
1940	27,215	+1.72%
1950	35,706	+2.75%
1960	35,414	−0.08%
1970	30,542	−1.47%

Year	Pop.	±% p.a.
1980	31,428	+0.29%
1990	31,838	+0.13%
2000	30,347	−0.48%
2010	27,545	−0.96%
2020	23,435	−1.60%

== History ==
The area of present-day Nikaho was part of ancient Ugo Province, dominated by the Satake clan during the Edo period, who ruled Kubota Domain under the Tokugawa shogunate. After the start of the Meiji period, it became part of Yuri District, Akita Prefecture in 1878 with the establishment of the modern municipalities system. The village of Hirasawa was established on April 1, 1889, and was raised to town status on June 4, 1902. After merging with the villages of Koide and Innai on March 31, 1955, it was renamed Nikaho town.

The city of Nikaho was established on October 1, 2005, from the merger of Nikaho, with the neighboring the towns of Kisakata and Konoura.

== Government ==
Nikaho has a mayor-council form of government with a directly elected mayor and a unicameral city legislature of 18 members. The city contributes one member to the Akita Prefectural Assembly. In terms of national politics, the city is part of Aichi District 3 of the lower house of the Diet of Japan.

== Economy ==
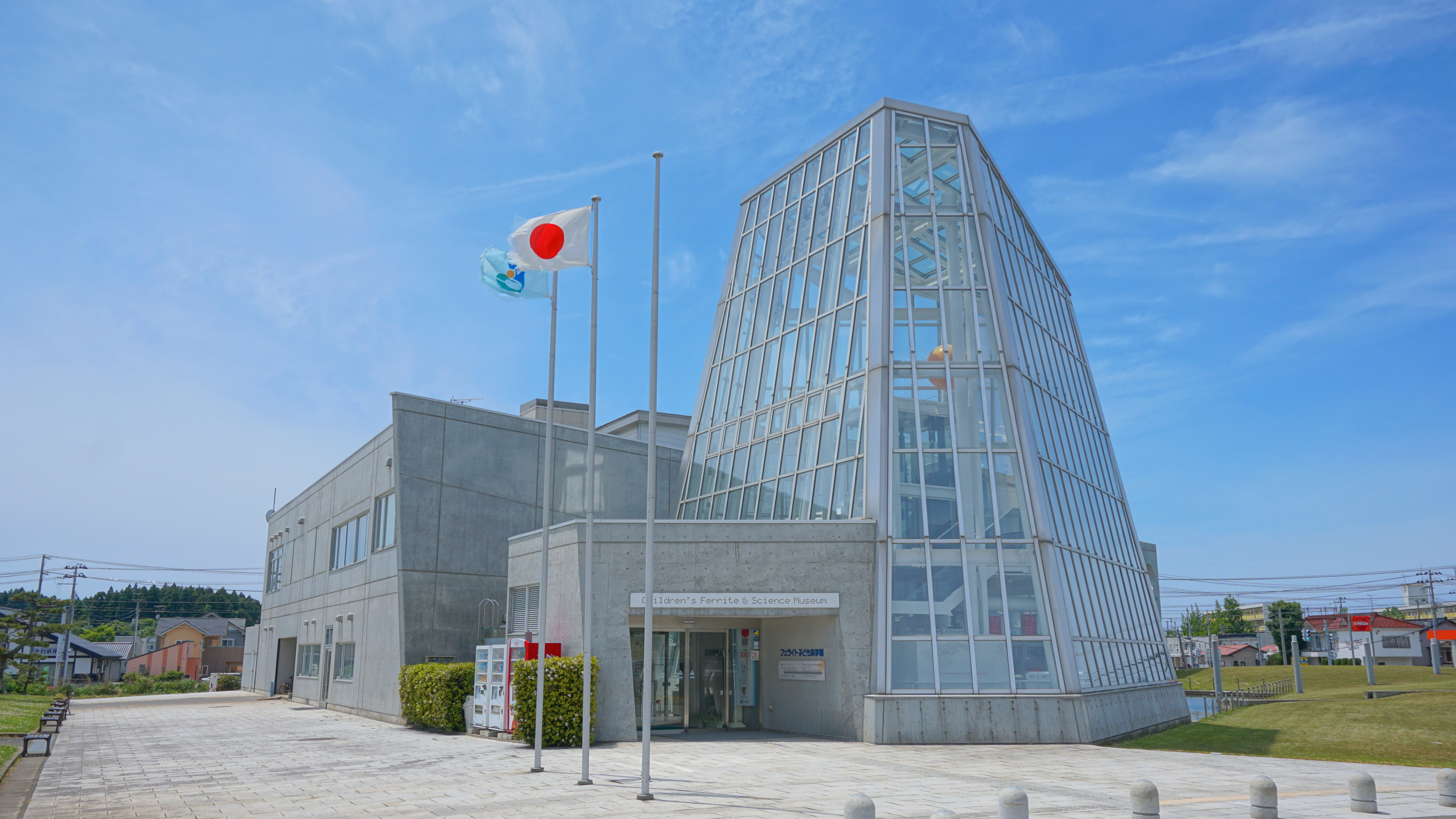
Children's Ferrite and Science Museum

The economy of Nikaho is based on commercial fishing and agriculture centered on rice cultivation, and light manufacturing. More than 80% of the manufactured goods shipment value is accounted for by the electronic components, devices, and electronic circuit manufacturing. Industry includes a large factory by the electronics firm TDK.

== Education ==
Nikaho has four public elementary schools and three public junior high schools operated by the city government, and one public high schools operated by the Akita Prefectural Board of Education.

== Transportation ==
=== Railway ===
East Japan Railway Company - Uetsu Main Line

- Kosagawa - Kamihama - Kisakata - Konoura - Nikaho

=== Highway ===
- Nihonkai-Tōhoku Expressway
- National Route 7

== Local attractions ==
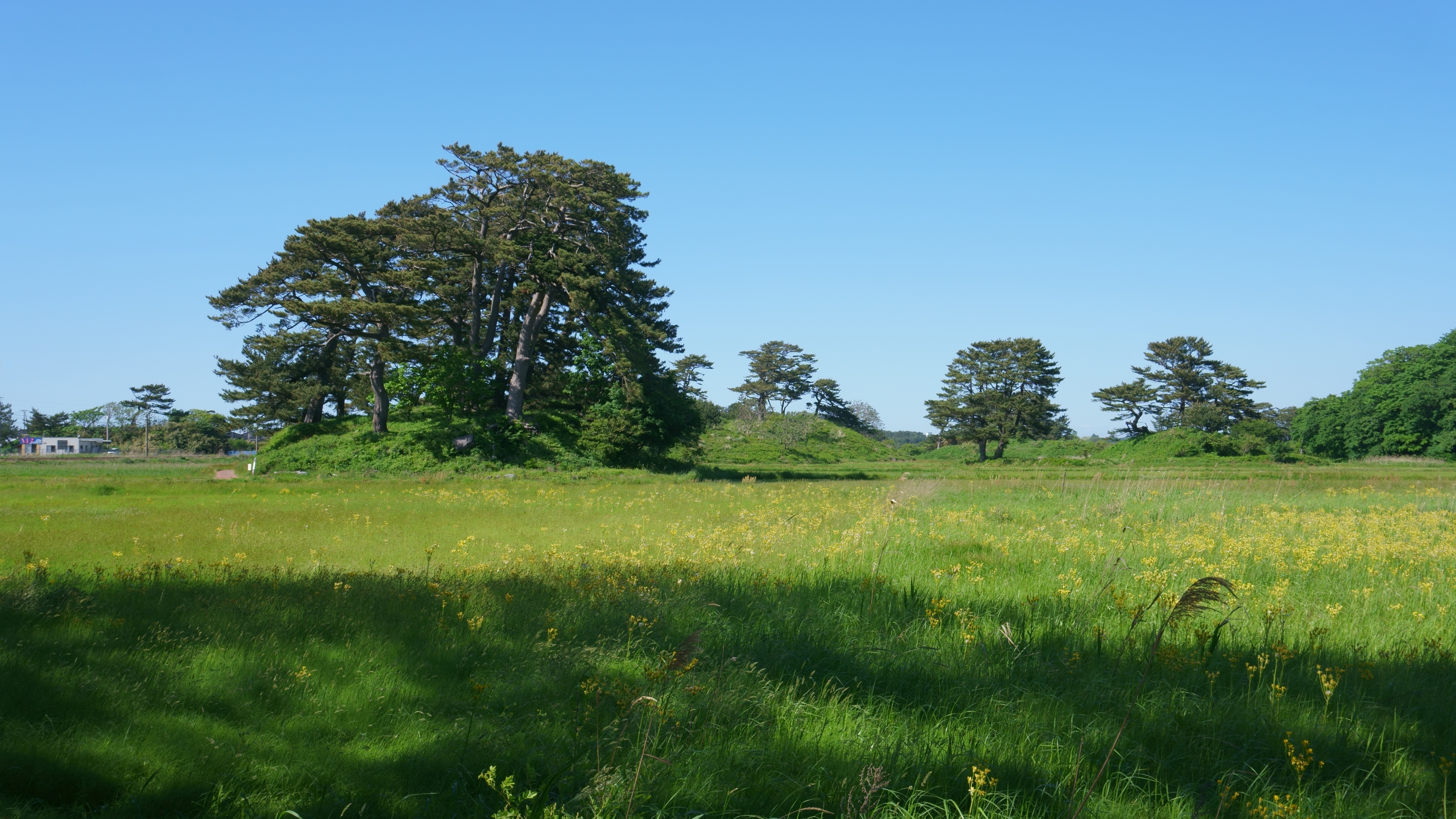
Scenery of Kisakata Kujukushima Islands

- Kanman-ji Temple (蚶満寺, Kanman-ji)
  a thousand-year old temple in the south of Nikaho which was made famous by the haiku poet Matsuo Bashō's visit to the area in 1689. He wrote of the temple in his Oku no Hosomichi.
- Kujūkushima (旧跡九十九島, Kyūseki Kujūkushima)
  a collection of clumps of land which used to be small islands until a major earthquake in 1804 submerged the sea around them. They were often compared to the similar small islands on the Pacific coast of Matsushima.
- Naso Falls (奈曽の白滝, Naso no Shirataki),
  waterfall that is a National Place of Scenic Beauty .
- Kosagawa Beach (小砂川海水浴場)
  a long stretch of sandy beach in the south of Nikaho.
- Kisakata Hot Spring (象潟温泉)
  An onsen (hot spring) located in the Nemunooka Roadside Station. The hot spring offers views of the Japan Sea coast.
- Ferrite Children's Science Museum (フェライト子ども科学館)
  a children's museum in the north of Nikaho with many interactive exhibits which explores the different uses of ferrite.
- Shirase Antarctic Memorial Museum (白瀬南極探検隊記念館)
  a memorial museum which focuses on the Antarctic Expedition by local explorer Shirase Nobu and includes a replica of Shirase's ship.
- TDK Museum (TDK歴史館)
  a museum full of information and exhibits about the company TDK. TDK was founded by a local man Kenzō Saitō and there are many TDK factories and suppliers in the area.
- TDK Akita General Sports Center
  a group of sports facilities

=== Parks in Nikaho ===
- Seishi Park (勢至公園, Seishi Kōen)
  a park surrounding a lake and ringed with cherry trees. It is especially attractive in late April and early May when the cherry trees start to bloom.
- Kuriyamaike Park (栗山池公園)
  a park in the foothills of Mount Chokai with a small lake, cherry trees and hydrangeas.
- Misaki Park (三崎公園)
  a park which snakes along the coast on the border of Yamagata and Akita Prefectures.
- Nikaho Heights (仁賀保高原, Nikaho Kōgen)
  a plateau in the foothills of Mount Chokai with splendid views of the area.

== Local events ==
- Fireworks
  A fireworks festival is held each year over three nights in each of the former towns of Nikaho City.
- Cod Festival (掛魚まつり, Kakeyo Matsuri)
  This religious event takes place in February in which cod are carried from the Konoura fishing port to a local Shinto shrine.
- Akita Triathlon Bashō's Race in Kisakata (秋田トライアスロン芭蕉レ―ス象潟大会)
  one of the top triathlon events in the Japanese calendar.
- Mount Chōkai MTB Race (鳥海山グルッと一周MTBサイクリング)
  a mountain bike race around the base of Mount Chōkai.

== Mount Chōkai ==
Mount Chōkai is an inactive volcano which stands alone on the border between Akita Prefecture and Yamagata Prefecture. It is 2236 metres high and is the second highest mountain in the Tōhoku area. It is popular with skiers, hikers and climbers.

There are two main trails for climbing Mount Chōkai from the Akita side. One trailhead is in Yurihonjō, Akita, north of Nikaho. The other, in Nikaho, starts at the Nakajima parking area. A one-way hike from the Nakajima commonly takes 4 hours and offers outstanding views of the Japan Sea coast and the lush greenery of the Nikaho area.

The mountain has its own unique Alpine plants and vegetation such as Chōkai Thistle (チョウカイアザミ) or Chōkai Fusuma (チョウカイフスマ).

=== Local crafts, arts, and food ===
- Sake (rice wine)
  There is one independent sake brewery in Nikaho: Hiraizumi (平泉)
- Hatahata Zushi (はたはたずし)
  a local sushi of raw hatahata fish.
- Oysters & abalone
  the coastline of Nikaho is renowned for its oysters and abalone.
- Karintō
  a local brown sugar-coated candy.
- Chōjin Neiger (超人ネイガー)
  a superhero character which was born in Nikaho.

== Sister cities ==
- Anacortes, Washington, United States
- Shawnee, Oklahoma, United States
- Zhuji, Zhejiang, China friendship city since October 23, 2008

== Noted people from Nikaho ==
- Tatsuki Fujimoto (藤本タツキ), mangaka.
- Shirase Nobu (白瀬矗), Antarctic explorer who led an expedition to the South Pole in 1910.
- Kenzō Saitō (齋藤憲三), founder of TDK.
