= Tsuya Station =

Railway station in Tozawa, Yamagata Prefecture, Japan

Tsuya Station 津谷駅
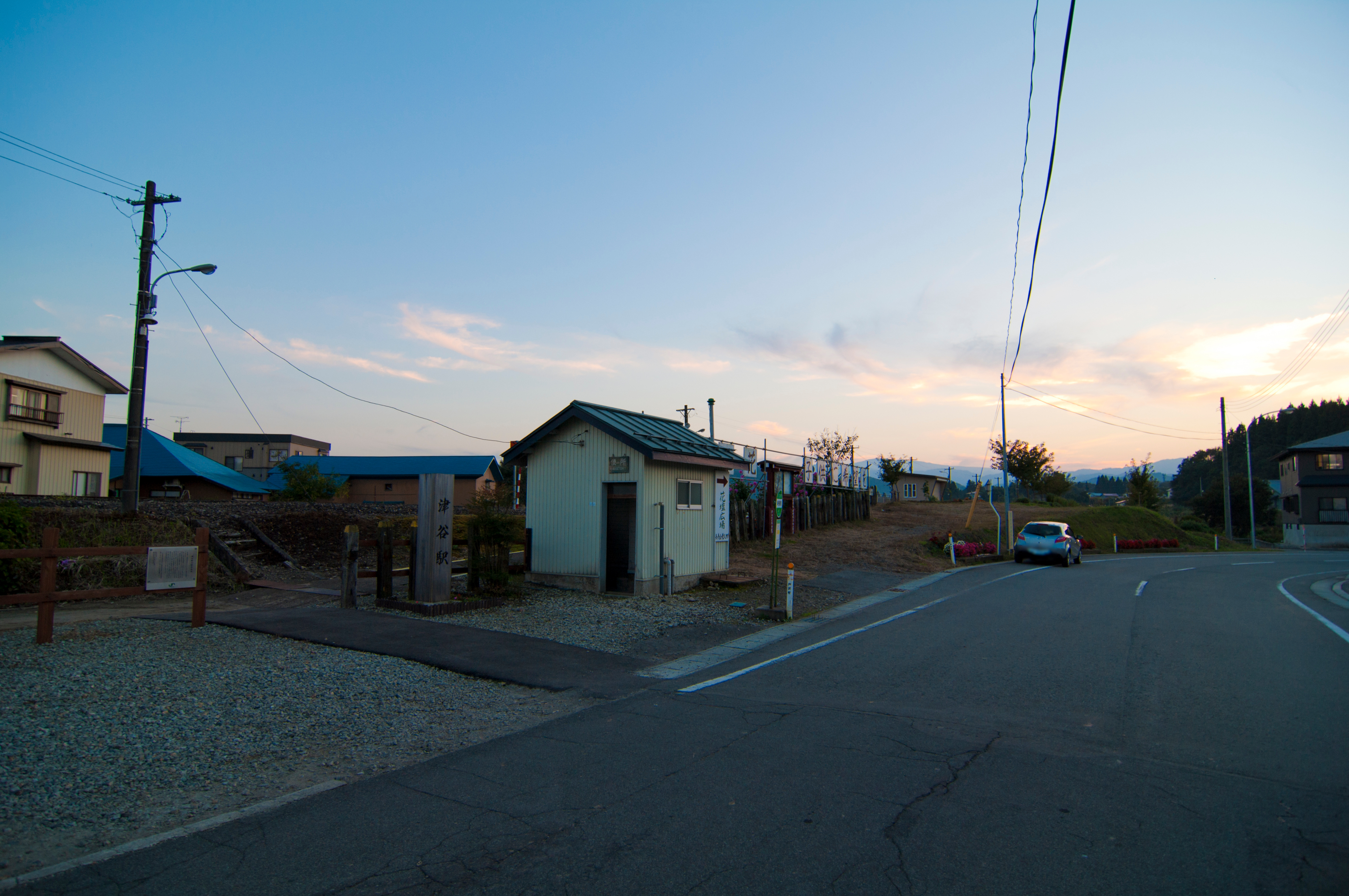
- Tsuya Station in 2010

General information
- Location: 151 Tsuya, Tozawa-machi. Mogami-gun, Yamagata-ken 999-6311; Japan
- Coordinates: 38°44′15″N 140°11′11″E
- Operator: JR East
- Line: ■ Rikuu West Line
- Distance: 12.9 km from Shinjō
- Platforms: 1 side platform

Other information
- Website: www.jreast.co.jp/estation/station/info.aspx?StationCd=1019

History
- Opened: September 6, 1914

Services
Preceding station	JR East	Following station
Furukuchi towards Sakata	Rikuu West Line Rapid Mogamigawa	Uzen-Zennami One-way operation
Furukuchi towards Sakata	Rikuu West Line Local	Uzen-Zennami towards Shinjō
Location
- Location within Yamagata Prefecture Location within Japan

Tsuya Station (津谷駅, Tsuya-eki) is a railway station in the town of Tozawa, Yamagata, Japan, operated by East Japan Railway Company (JR East).

== Lines ==
Tsuya Station is served by the Rikuu West Line, and is located 12.9 rail kilometers from the terminus of the line at Shinjō Station.

== Station layout ==
The station has one side platform, serving a bidirectional single track. The station is unattended.

== History ==
Tsuya Station opened on September 6, 1914. The station was absorbed into the JR East network upon the privatization of JNR on April 1, 1987.

== Surrounding area ==
- Confluence of the Mogami River with the Sakegawa River
- Tozawa Post Office

== See also ==
- List of railway stations in Japan
