= Minamino Station =

Railway station in Shōnai, Yamagata Prefecture, Japan

Minamino Station 南野駅
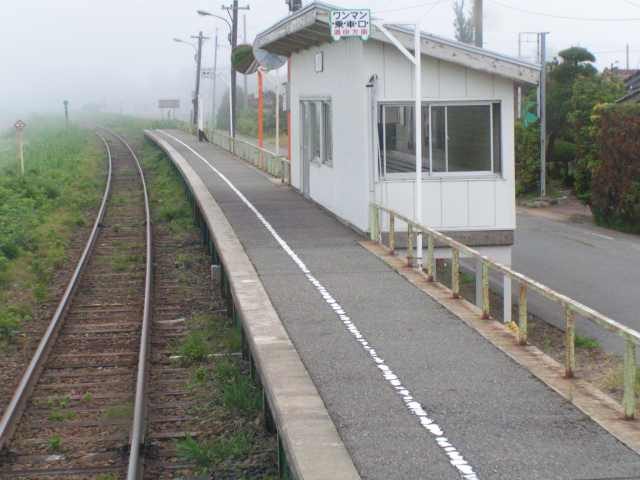
- Minamino Station in June 2006

General information
- Location: Kitaura Minamino, Shōnai-machi, Higashitagawa-gun, Yamagata-ken 999-7725; Japan
- Coordinates: 38°49′05″N 139°56′41″E
- Operator: JR East
- Line: ■ Rikuu West Line
- Distance: 38.9 kilometers from Shinjō
- Platforms: 1 side platform

Other information
- Status: Unstaffed
- Website: Official website

History
- Opened: May 15, 1959

Passengers
- FY2004: 22

Services
| Preceding station | JR East | Following station |
|---|---|---|
| Amarume towards Sakata | Rikuu West Line Rapid Mogamigawa | Karikawa One-way operation |
| Amarume towards Sakata | Rikuu West Line Local | Karikawa towards Shinjō |
Location
- Location within Yamagata Prefecture Location within Japan

Minamino Station (南野駅, Minamino-eki) is a railway station in the town of Shōnai, Yamagata, Japan, operated by East Japan Railway Company (JR East).

== Lines ==
Minamino Station is served by the Rikuu West Line, and is located 38.9 rail kilometers from the terminus of the line at Shinjō Station.

== Station layout ==
The station has one side platform, serving a bidirectional single track. The station is unattended.

== History ==
Minamino Station opened on May 15, 1959. The station was absorbed into the JR East network upon the privatization of Japanese National Railways (JNR) on April 1, 1987.

== Surrounding area ==
The station is located in a rural area surrounded by rice fields, with few houses or commercial buildings located in the immediate vicinity.

== See also ==
- List of railway stations in Japan
