= Karikawa Station =

Railway station in Shōnai, Yamagata Prefecture, Japan

Karikawa Station 狩川駅
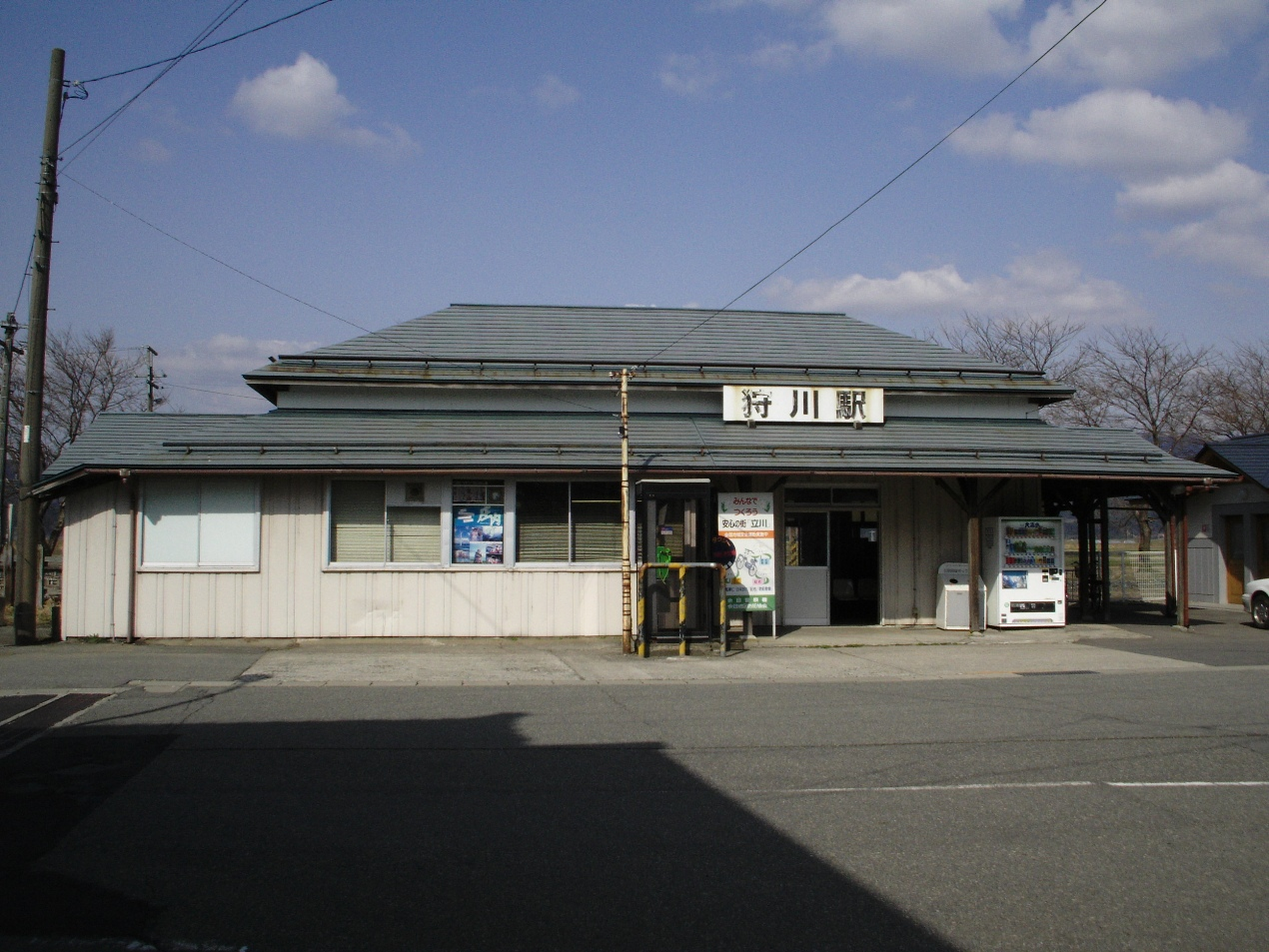
- Karikawa Station in April 2007

General information
- Location: Karikawa Imaoka 112, Shōnai-machi, Higashitagawa-gun, Yamagata-ken 999-6601; Japan
- Coordinates: 38°47′37″N 139°58′37″E
- Operator: JR East
- Line: ■ Rikuu West Line
- Distance: 34.9 kilometers from Shinjō
- Platforms: 1 island platform

Other information
- Status: Staffed
- Website: Official website

History
- Opened: August 16, 1914

Passengers
- FY2018: 65

Services
Preceding station	JR East	Following station
Amarume One-way operation	Rikuu West Line Rapid Mogamigawa	Furukuchi towards Shinjō
Minamino towards Sakata	Rikuu West Line Rapid Mogamigawa	Kiyokawa One-way operation
Minamino towards Sakata	Rikuu West Line Local	Kiyokawa towards Shinjō
Location

Karikawa Station (狩川駅, Karikawa-eki) is a railway station on the Rikuu West Line in Shōnai, Yamagata, Japan, operated by East Japan Railway Company (JR East).

== Lines ==
Karikawa Station is served by the Rikuu West Line, and is located 34.9 rail kilometers from the terminus of the line at Shinjō Station.

== Station layout ==
The station has one island platform of which only one side is in use, serving a bidirectional single track. It is connected to the station building by a level crossing. The station is staffed.

== History ==
Karikawa Station opened on August 16, 1914. The station was absorbed into the JR East network upon the privatization of JNR on April 1, 1987.

== Passenger statistics ==
In fiscal 2018, the station was used by an average of 65 passengers daily (boarding passengers only).

== Surrounding area ==
- Karikawa Post Office
- Site of Karikawa Castle

== See also ==
- List of railway stations in Japan
