= Rikuu Line =

The Rikuu Line may refer to either or both of the following railway lines in Japan:

- Rikuu East Line
- Rikuu West Line
