= Kiyokawa Station =

Railway station in Shōnai, Yamagata Prefecture, Japan

Kiyokawa Station 清川駅
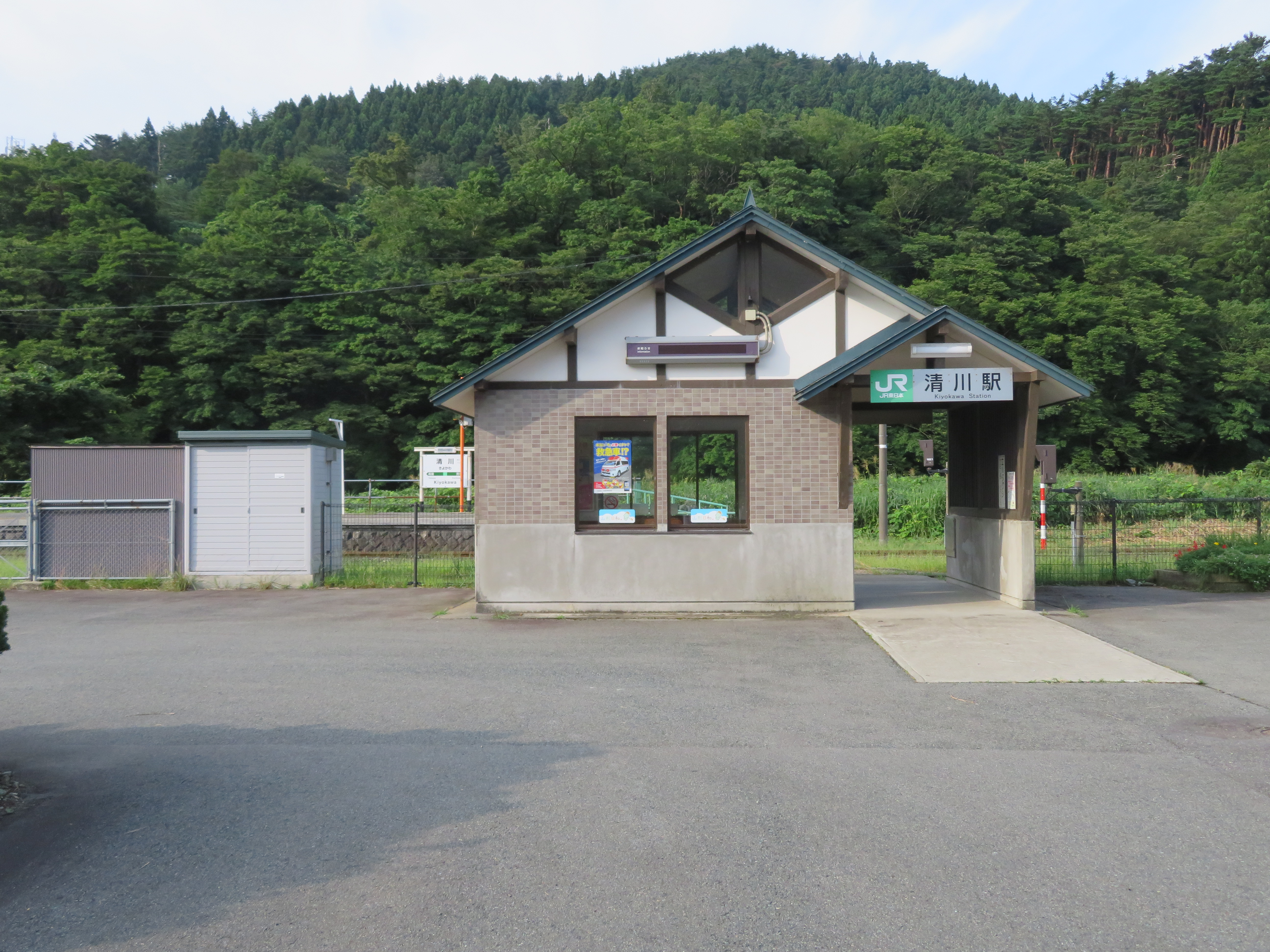
- Kiyokawa Station in August 2020

General information
- Location: Kiyokawa Shimokawahara 4, Shōnai-machi, Higashitagawa-gun, Yamagata-ken 999-6606; Japan
- Coordinates: 38°47′25″N 140°01′15″E
- Operator: JR East
- Line: ■ Rikuu West Line
- Distance: 31.1 kilometers from Shinjō
- Platforms: 1 island platform

Other information
- Status: Staffed
- Website: Official website

History
- Opened: June 4, 1914

Passengers
- FY2004: 74

Services
Preceding station	JR East	Following station
Karikawa towards Sakata	Rikuu West Line Rapid Mogamigawa	Takaya One-way operation
Karikawa towards Sakata	Rikuu West Line Local	Takaya towards Shinjō
Location

Kiyokawa Station (清川駅, Kiyokawa-eki) is a railway station on the Rikuu West Line in Shōnai, Yamagata, Japan, operated by East Japan Railway Company (JR East).

== Lines ==
Kiyokawa Station is served by the Rikuu West Line, and is located 31.1 rail kilometers from the terminus of the line at Shinjō Station.

== Station layout ==
The station has one island platform of which only one side is in use, serving a bidirectional single track. The second track is still in place, although the signaling equipment has been removed. The platform is connected to the station building by a level crossing. The station is unattended.

== History ==
Kiyokawa Station opened on June 4, 1914. The station was absorbed into the JR East network upon the privatization of JNR on April 1, 1987. The station building was rebuilt in March 2000.

== Surrounding area ==
- Kiyokawa Post Office

== See also ==
- List of railway stations in Japan
