= Takaya Station =

Railway station in Tozawa, Yamagata Prefecture, Japan

Takaya Station 高屋駅
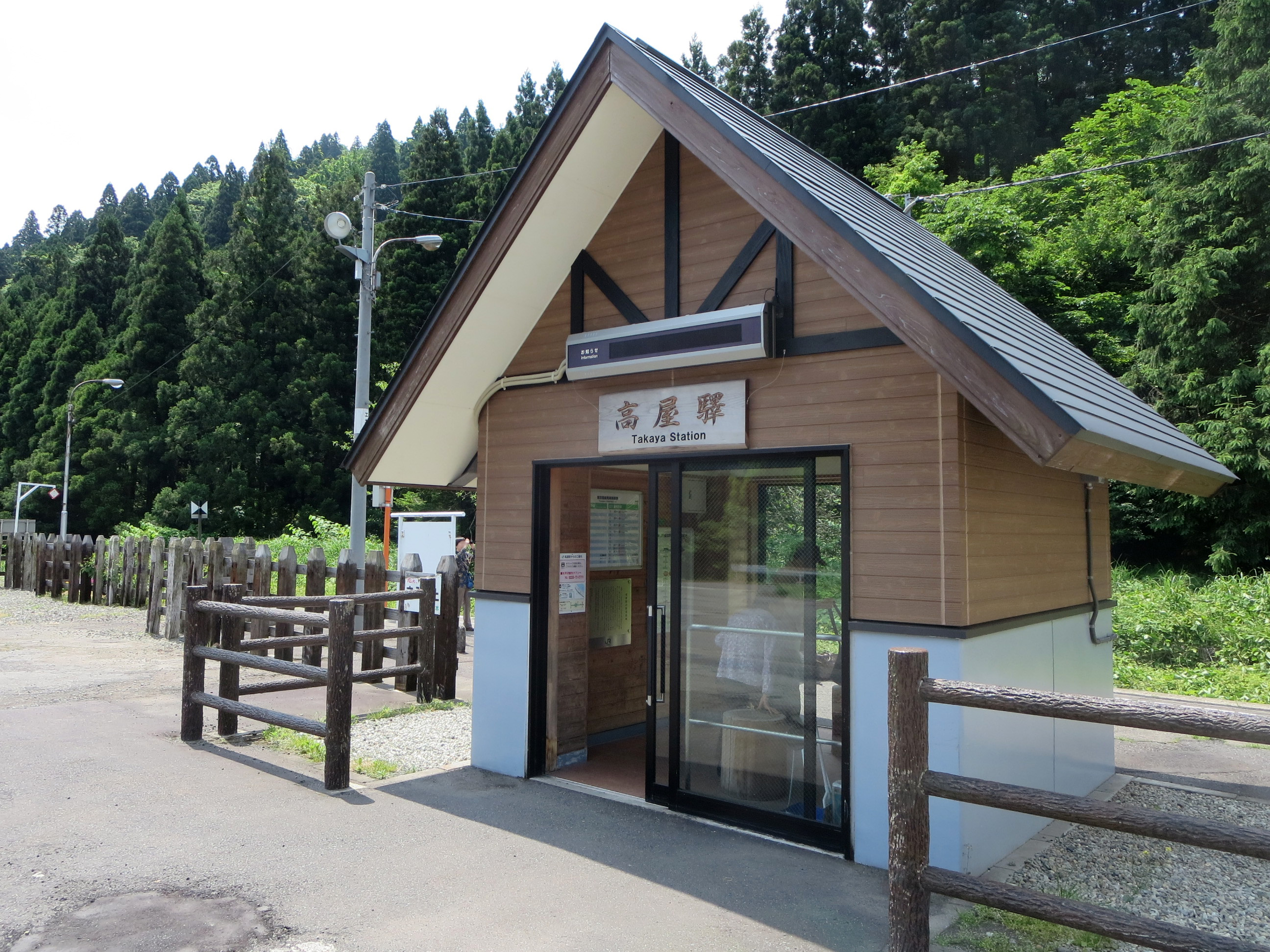
- Takaya Station in June 2016

General information
- Location: Takaya, Furukuchi, Tozawa-mura, Mogami-gun, Yamagata-ken 999-6401; Japan
- Coordinates: 38°45′09″N 140°04′16″E
- Operator: JR East
- Line: ■ Rikuu West Line
- Distance: 24.8 km from Shinjō
- Platforms: 1
- Tracks: 1

Other information
- Website: www.jreast.co.jp/estation/station/info.aspx?StationCd=945

History
- Opened: 15 February 1952

Services
Preceding station	JR East	Following station
Kiyokawa towards Sakata	Rikuu West Line Rapid Mogamigawa	Furukuchi One-way operation
Kiyokawa towards Sakata	Rikuu West Line Local	Furukuchi towards Shinjō
Location
- Location within Yamagata Prefecture Location within Japan

Takaya Station (高屋駅, Takaya-eki) is a railway station in the town of Tozawa, Yamagata Prefecture, Japan, operated by East Japan Railway Company (JR East).

Since January 16, 2026, all trains have been scheduled to pass through the station without stopping.

== Lines ==
Takaya Station is served by the Rikuu West Line, and is located 24.8 kilometers from the terminus of the line at Shinjō Station.

== Station layout ==
Takaya Station has one side platform, serving a single bidirectional track. The station is unattended.

== History ==
Takaya Station opened on February 15, 1952. With the privatization of Japanese National Railways (JNR) on April 1, 1987, the station came under the control of JR East.

== Surrounding area ==
- Shiraito Falls
- Mogami River
- Kusanagi Hot Springs

== See also ==
- List of railway stations in Japan
