= Uzen-Zennami Station =

Railway station in Shinjō, Yamagata Prefecture, Japan

Uzen-Zennami Station 羽前前波駅
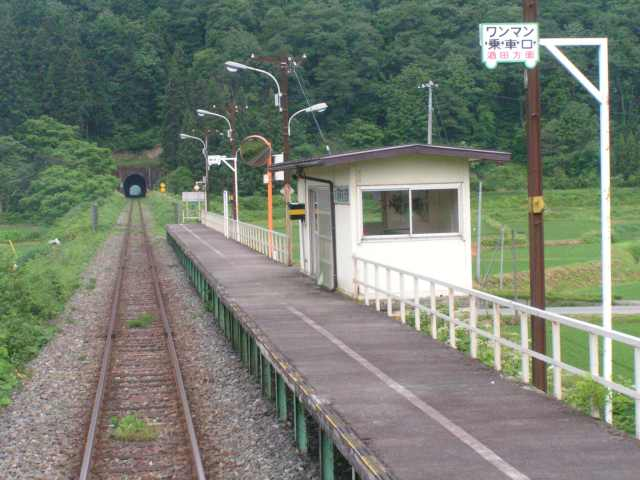
- Uzen-Zennami Station in June 2006

General information
- Location: Masugata-Zennami, Shinjō-shi, Yamagata-ken 996-0111; Japan
- Coordinates: 38°44′52.00″N 140°12′33.91″E
- Operator: JR East
- Line: ■ Rikuu West Line
- Distance: 10.6 kilometers from Shinjō
- Platforms: 1 side platform

Other information
- Status: Unstaffed
- Website: Official website

History
- Opened: September 1, 1966

Services
Preceding station	JR East	Following station
Tsuya towards Sakata	Rikuu West Line Rapid Mogamigawa	Masukata One-way operation
Tsuya towards Sakata	Rikuu West Line Local	Masukata towards Shinjō
Location
- Location within Yamagata Prefecture Location within Japan

Uzen-Zennami Station (羽前前波駅, Uzen-Zennami-eki) is a railway station in the city of Shinjō, Yamagata, Japan, operated by East Japan Railway Company (JR East).

== Lines ==
Uzen-Zennami Station is served by the Rikuu West Line, and is located 10.6 rail kilometers from the terminus of the line at Shinjō Station.

== Station layout ==
Uzen-Zennami Station has a single side platform, serving one bi-directional track. The station is unattended, and the station structure consists only of a small shelter on the platform.

== History ==
Uzen-Zennami Station opened on September 1, 1966. The station was absorbed into the JR East network upon the privatization of JNR on April 1, 1987.

== Surrounding area ==
The station is surrounded by rice fields, with no stores or houses in the immediate vicinity.

== See also ==
- List of railway stations in Japan
