= Shōnai, Yamagata =

Shōnai 庄内町
- Town
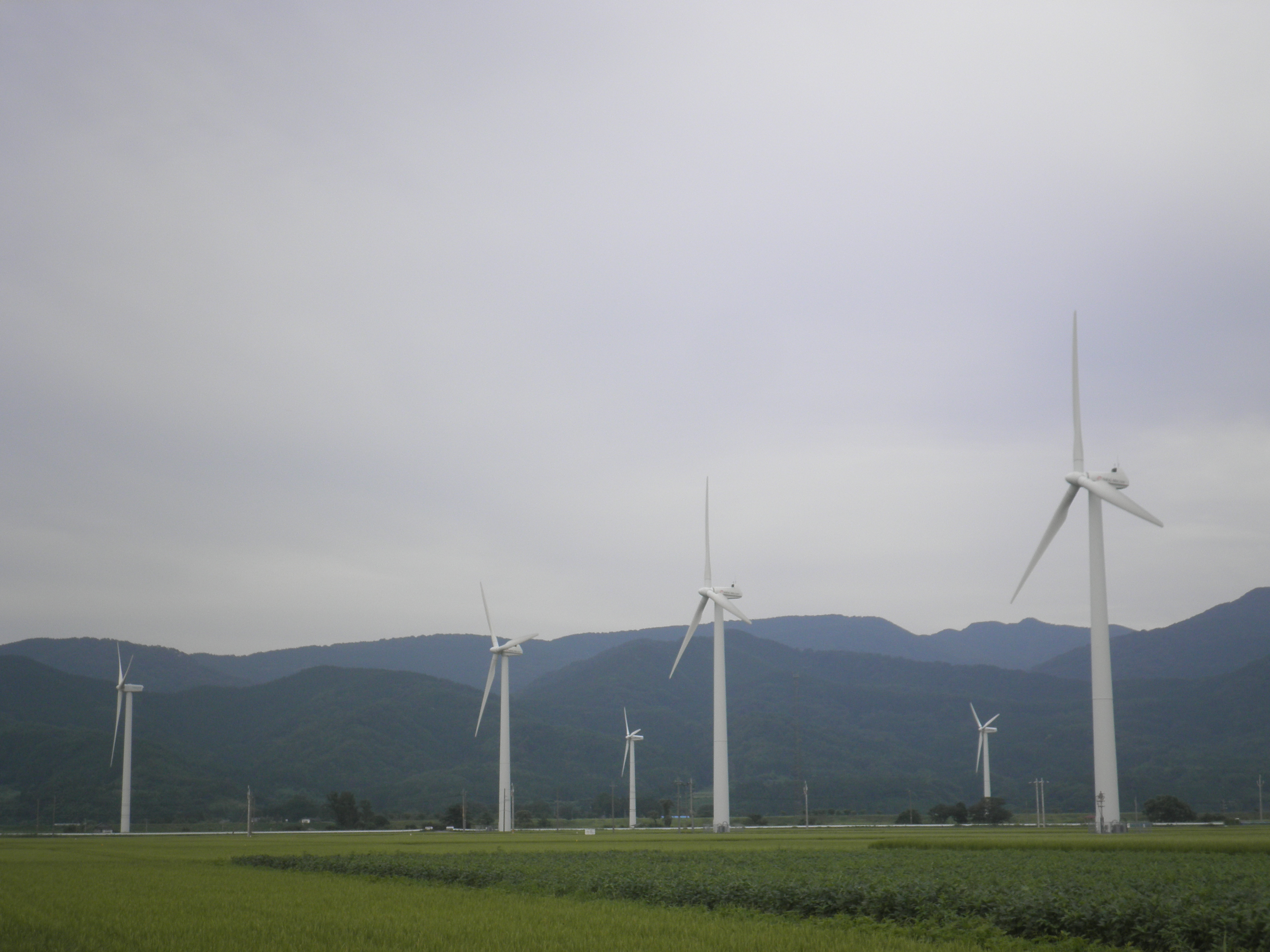
- Wind farm in Shonai

- Flag Seal

- Location of Shōnai in Yamagata Prefecture

- Coordinates: 38°50′59.6″N 139°54′17″E
- Country: Japan
- Region: Tōhoku
- Prefecture: Yamagata
- District: Higashitagawa

Area
  - Total: 249.17 km^{2} (96.21 sq mi)

Population (February 2020)
  - Total: 20,940
  - Density: 84.04/km^{2} (217.7/sq mi)
- Time zone: UTC+9 (Japan Standard Time)
- Phone number: 0234-43-2211
- Address: 132-1 Amarume-cho, Shōnai-machi, Higashitagawa-gun, Yamagata-ken 999-7781
- Climate: Cfa
- Website: Official website
- Symbols
- Bird: Eurasian skylark
- Flower: Fritillaria camschatcensis
- Tree: Camellia japonica

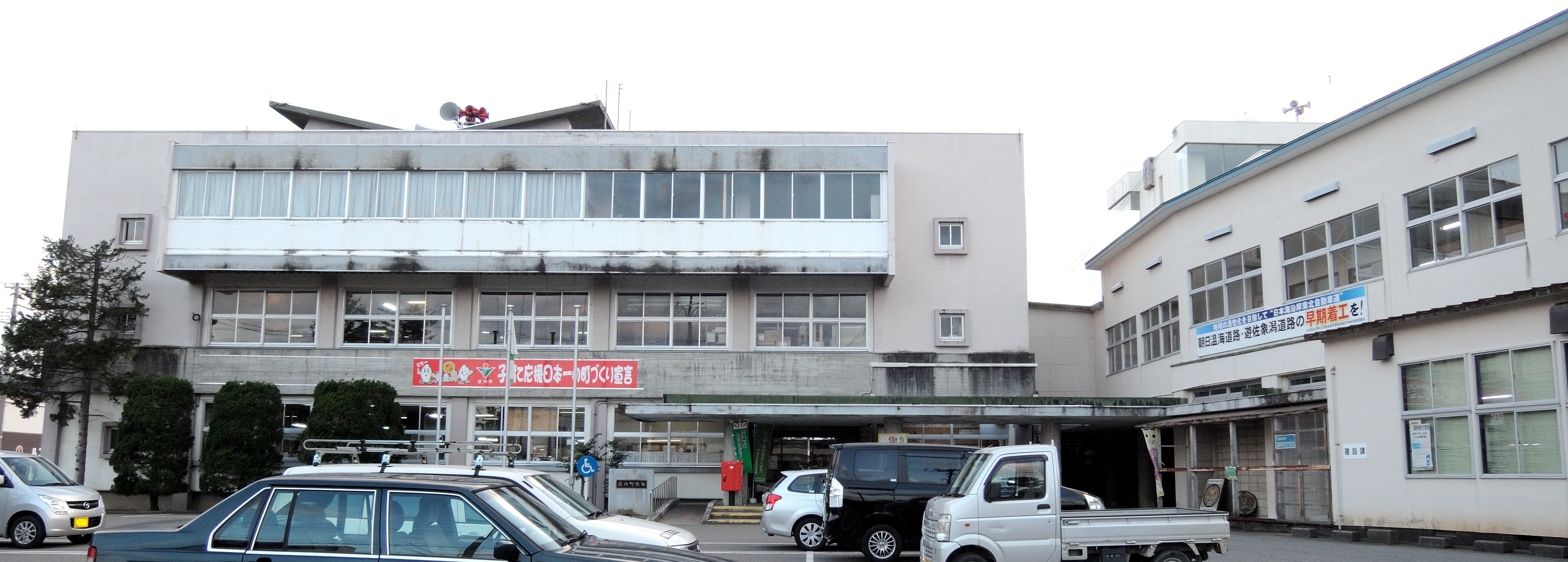
Shōnai town hall

Shōnai (庄内町, Shōnai-machi) is a town located in Yamagata Prefecture, Japan. As of 29 February 2020, the town has an estimated population of 20,940 in 7108 households, and a population density of 87.5 per km^{2}. The total area of the town is 249.17 square kilometres (96 sq mi).

== Geography ==
Shōnai is located in the coastal plains of north-central Yamagata Prefecture. The Mogami River flows through the town. Mount Gassan, the highest of the Three Mountains of Dewa is at the intersection of the borders of Shōnai, Tsuruoka, Ōkura and Nishikawa.

=== Neighboring municipalities ===
- Yamagata Prefecture
  - Mikawa
  - Nishikawa
  - Ōkura
  - Sakata
  - Tozawa
  - Tsuruoka

=== Climate ===
Shōnai has a humid subtropical climate (Köppen climate classification Cfa) with large seasonal temperature differences, with warm to hot (and often humid) summers and cold (sometimes severely cold) winters. Precipitation is significant throughout the year, but is heaviest from August to October. The average annual temperature in Shōnai is 12.0 °C (53.6 °F). The average annual rainfall is 2,074.1 mm (81.66 in) with November as the wettest month. The temperatures are highest on average in August, at around 24.5 °C (76.1 °F), and lowest in January, at around 0.6 °C (33.1 °F).

Climate data for Karigawa, Shōnai, elevation 17 m (56 ft), (1991−2020 normals, extremes 1976−present)
Month	Jan	Feb	Mar	Apr	May	Jun	Jul	Aug	Sep	Oct	Nov	Dec	Year
Record high °C (°F)	13.6 (56.5)	15.7 (60.3)	22.8 (73.0)	30.1 (86.2)	32.2 (90.0)	32.0 (89.6)	36.6 (97.9)	37.6 (99.7)	34.7 (94.5)	29.9 (85.8)	24.0 (75.2)	18.0 (64.4)	37.6 (99.7)
Mean daily maximum °C (°F)	3.0 (37.4)	3.6 (38.5)	7.8 (46.0)	14.6 (58.3)	20.2 (68.4)	24.0 (75.2)	27.2 (81.0)	29.0 (84.2)	25.2 (77.4)	19.1 (66.4)	12.4 (54.3)	6.0 (42.8)	16.0 (60.8)
Daily mean °C (°F)	0.6 (33.1)	0.8 (33.4)	3.8 (38.8)	9.4 (48.9)	15.2 (59.4)	19.6 (67.3)	23.1 (73.6)	24.5 (76.1)	20.5 (68.9)	14.5 (58.1)	8.4 (47.1)	3.1 (37.6)	12.0 (53.5)
Mean daily minimum °C (°F)	−1.8 (28.8)	−2.0 (28.4)	0.2 (32.4)	4.5 (40.1)	10.7 (51.3)	15.8 (60.4)	19.9 (67.8)	21.0 (69.8)	16.8 (62.2)	10.6 (51.1)	4.9 (40.8)	0.6 (33.1)	8.4 (47.2)
Record low °C (°F)	−11.8 (10.8)	−13.0 (8.6)	−9.0 (15.8)	−6.6 (20.1)	1.9 (35.4)	7.0 (44.6)	11.5 (52.7)	13.5 (56.3)	6.2 (43.2)	1.7 (35.1)	−4.0 (24.8)	−10.7 (12.7)	−13.0 (8.6)
Average precipitation mm (inches)	190.9 (7.52)	125.2 (4.93)	119.6 (4.71)	103.1 (4.06)	121.7 (4.79)	125.2 (4.93)	227.2 (8.94)	218.7 (8.61)	170.3 (6.70)	202.0 (7.95)	237.1 (9.33)	228.6 (9.00)	2,074.1 (81.66)
Average snowfall cm (inches)	209 (82)	165 (65)	69 (27)	4 (1.6)	0 (0)	0 (0)	0 (0)	0 (0)	0 (0)	0 (0)	5 (2.0)	84 (33)	518 (204)
Average extreme snow depth cm (inches)	59 (23)	73 (29)	42 (17)	4 (1.6)	0 (0)	0 (0)	0 (0)	0 (0)	0 (0)	0 (0)	3 (1.2)	28 (11)	73 (29)
Average precipitation days (≥ 1.0 mm)	24.4	20.0	17.8	13.5	12.0	11.0	13.5	12.3	13.9	15.7	19.7	23.7	197.5
Average snowy days (≥ 3 cm)	19.4	17.8	9.1	0.5	0	0	0	0	0	0	0.5	8.6	55.9
Mean monthly sunshine hours	25.9	47.3	99.1	155.5	185.8	169.4	143.3	183.3	142.1	118.6	79.6	34.8	1,384.7
Source: Japan Meteorological Agency

== Demographics ==
Per Japanese census data, the population of Shōnai peaked around 1950 and has declined gradually since then. It is now less than it was a hundred years ago.

Historical population
Year	Pop.	±%
1920	25,848	—
1930	28,224	+9.2%
1940	29,310	+3.8%
1950	33,961	+15.9%
1960	33,160	−2.4%
1970	28,925	−12.8%
1980	27,798	−3.9%
1990	26,705	−3.9%
2000	25,489	−4.6%
2010	23,158	−9.1%
2020	20,151	−13.0%

== History ==
The area of present-day Shōnai was part of ancient Dewa Province. After the start of the Meiji period, the area became part of Higashitagawa District, Yamagata Prefecture. The town of Amarume was established on April 1, 1889, with the creation of the modern municipalities system, and the town of Karikawa on April 1, 1937. Karikawa merged with the neighboring villages of Kiyokawa and Tachiyazawa on October 1, 1954, and was renamed Tachikawa. On July 1, 2005, the towns of Tachikawa and Amarume merged to form the new town of Shōnai.

== Economy ==
The economy of Shōnai is based on agriculture.

== Education ==
Shōnai has five public elementary schools and two public middle schools operated by the town government, and one public high school operated by the Yamagata Prefectural Board of Education.

== Transportation ==
=== Railway ===
East Japan Railway Company - Rikuu West Line

- Kiyokawa - Karikawa - Minamino - Amarume

East Japan Railway Company - Uetsu Main Line

- Nishibukuro - Amarume - Kita-Amarume

=== Highway ===
- National Route 47
- National Route 345

== International relations ==
=== Sister cities ===
- Korsakov, Russia, since July 23, 1992
- (United States) Honolulu, US, since November 3, 2025
