= Masukata Station =

Railway station in Shinjō, Yamagata Prefecture, Japan

Masukata Station 升形駅
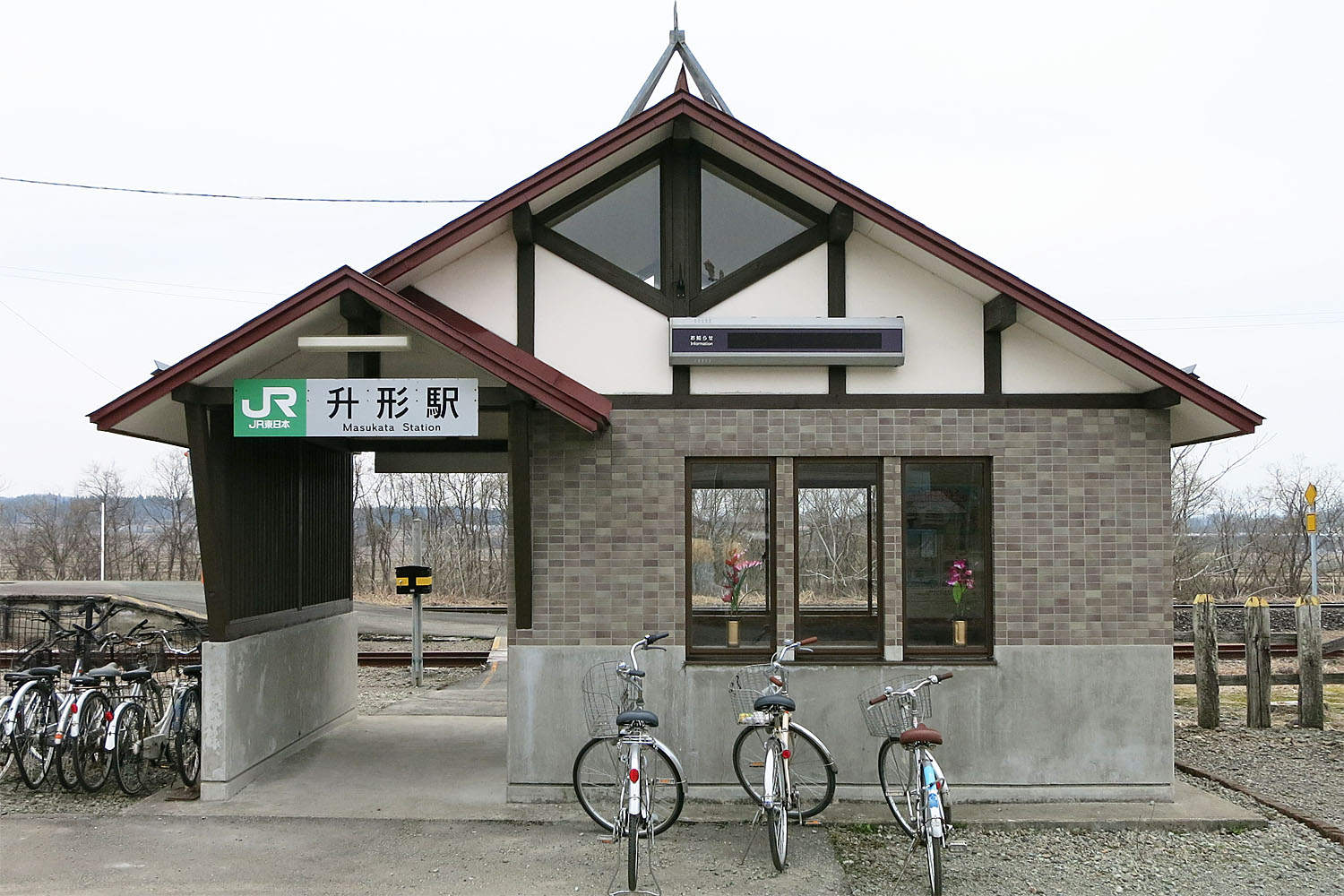
- Masukata Station in April 2013

General information
- Location: Masugata-Yuno, Shinjō-shi, Yamagata-ken 996-0111; Japan
- Coordinates: 38°45′06″N 140°14′40″E
- Operator: JR East
- Line: ■ Rikuu West Line
- Distance: 7.5 kilometers from Shinjō
- Platforms: 1 island platform

Other information
- Status: Unstaffed
- Website: Official website

History
- Opened: December 7, 1913

Passengers
- FY2004: 11

Services
Preceding station	JR East	Following station
Uzen-Zennami towards Sakata	Rikuu West Line Rapid Mogamigawa	Shinjō One-way operation
Uzen-Zennami towards Sakata	Rikuu West Line Local	Shinjō Terminus
Location
- Location within Yamagata Prefecture Location within Japan

Masukata Station (升形駅, Masukata-eki) is a railway station in the city of Shinjō, Yamagata, Japan, operated by East Japan Railway Company (JR East).

== Lines ==
Masukata Station is served by the Rikuu West Line, and is located 7.5 rail kilometers from the terminus of the line at Shinjō Station.

== Station layout ==
The station has one island platform, of which only one side is in use, serving traffic in both directions. The station is unattended.

== History ==
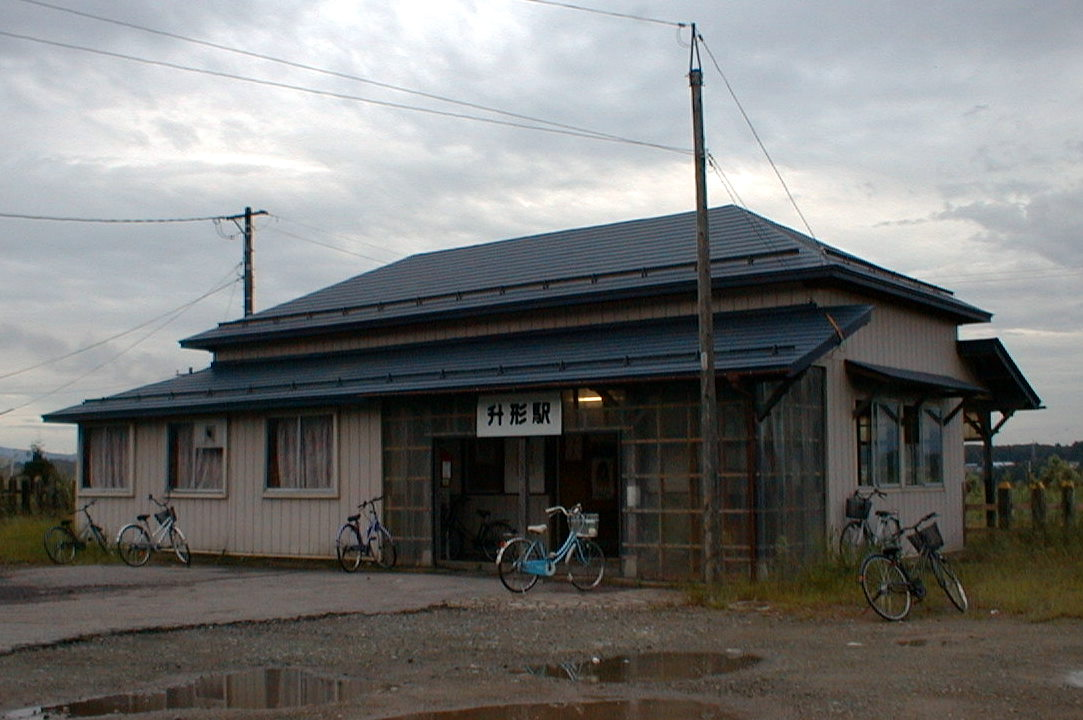
The previous station building, in August 1998

Masukata Station opened on December 7, 1913. The station was absorbed into the JR East network upon the privatization of JNR on April 1, 1987. A new station building was completed in March 2000.

== Surrounding area ==
- Masukata Elementary School
- National Route 458

== See also ==
- List of railway stations in Japan
