= Rikuu West Line =

Railway line in Japan

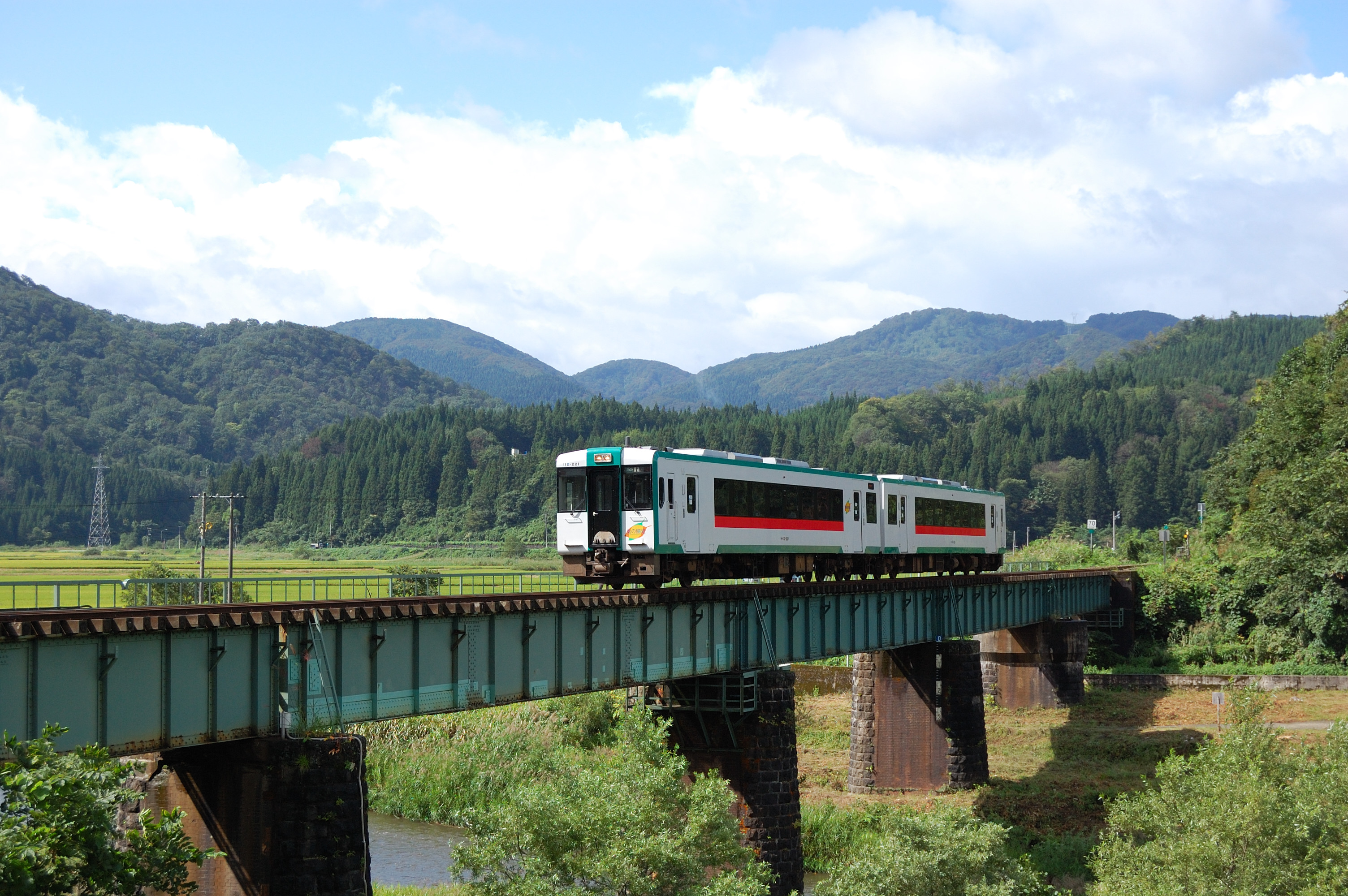
- DMU train on the Rikuu West Line crossing the Tsunokawa River in Tozawa, Yamagata, Japan.

Overview
- Native name: 陸羽西線
- Status: Operational
- Owner: JR East
- Locale: Yamagata Prefecture
- Termini: Shinjō; Amarume
- Stations: 10

Service
- Operator: JR East
- Depot: Kogota
- Rolling stock: KiHa 110 series DMU

History
- Opened: 1913

Technical
- Line length: 43.0 km (26.7 mi)
- Number of tracks: Entire line single tracked
- Character: Rural
- Track gauge: 1,067 mm (3 ft 6 in)
- Electrification: None
- Operating speed: 95 km/h (59 mph)

Line map Red: Rikuu West Line Blue: Uetsu Main Line (Amarume - Sakata)

The Rikuu West Line (陸羽西線, Rikuu-sai-sen) is a railway line in Yamagata Prefecture, Japan, operated by the East Japan Railway Company (JR East). It connects Shinjō Station to Amarume Station, and trains continue on to Sakata Station, even though it is not officially a part of the Rikuu West Line.

Its name refers to the ancient provinces of Mutsu (陸奥) and Dewa (出羽) (or alternatively, the Meiji-era provinces of Rikuzen (陸前) and Uzen (羽前)), although strictly speaking, only the Rikuu East Line connects both areas.

== Station list ==
- All stations are located in Yamagata Prefecture.

Station	Japanese	Distance (km)		Rapid	Transfers		Location
Station	Japanese	Between stations	Total	Rapid	Transfers		Location
Shinjō	新庄	-	0.0	●	Yamagata Shinkansen; ■ Ōu Main Line; ■ Rikuu East Line	∨	Shinjō
Masukata	升形	7.5	7.5	▼		｜	Shinjō
Uzen-Zennami	羽前前波	3.1	10.6	▼		｜	Shinjō
Tsuya	津谷	2.3	12.9	▼		｜	Tozawa
Furukuchi	古口	4.1	17.0	●		◇	Tozawa
Takaya	高屋	7.8	24.8	▼		｜	Tozawa
Kiyokawa	清川	6.3	31.1	▼		｜	Shōnai
Karikawa	狩川	3.8	34.9	●		｜	Shōnai
Minamino	南野	4.0	38.9	▼		｜	Shōnai
Amarume	余目	4.1	43.0	●	■ Uetsu Main Line	^	Shōnai
Through to the Uetsu Main Line (via Kita-Amarume, Sagoshi and Higashi-Sakata)
Sakata	酒田	-	55.3	●	■ Uetsu Main Line	∥	Sakata

Symbols:

- | - Single-track
- ◇ - Single-track; station where trains can pass
- ^ - Double-track section starts from this point
- ∥ - Double-track
- ∨ - Single-track section starts from this point

== Rolling stock ==
- KiHa 110 series DMUs

== History ==
The line was opened in sections between 1913 and 1914. Freight services ceased in 1987, and CTC signalling was commissioned in 1991.

Due to the construction of a tunnel, that is part of Shinjo Sakata Road of National Route 47, the Rikuu West Line has temporarily suspended services since 14 May 2022 until at least 2024 or 2025, with replacement buses operating in the neighbour towns of stations.

On 26 September 2025, it was announced that the Rikuu West Line would reopen on 16 January of the following year. Replacement bus service will stop on the same day. Additionally, upon the resumption of service, the low-usage stations of Uzen-Zennami and Takaya will no longer be serviced by trains.
