= Furukuchi Station =

Railway station in Tozawa, Yamagata Prefecture, Japan

Furukuchi Station 古口駅
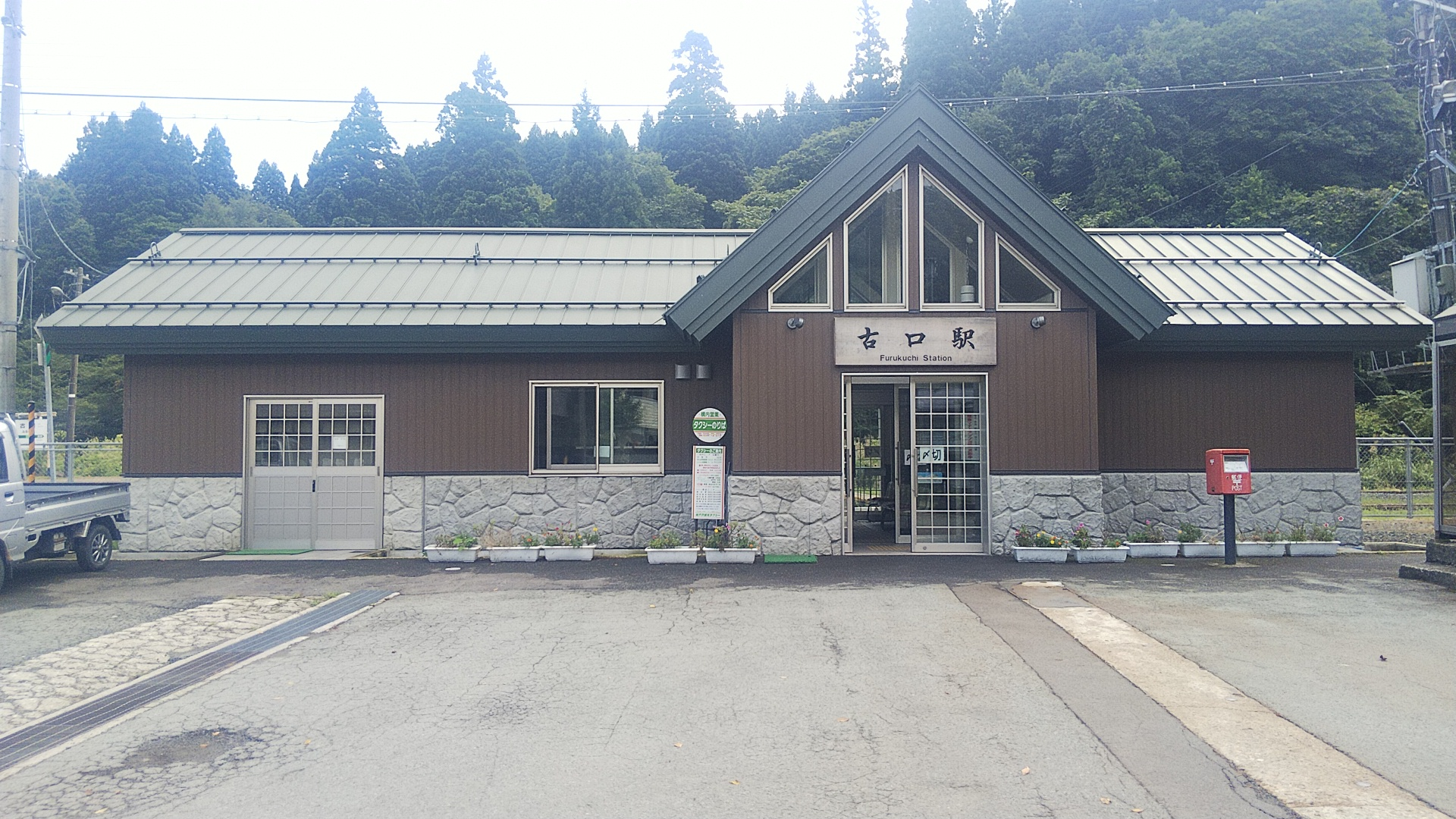
- Furukuchi Station, August 2019

General information
- Location: Furukuchi, Tozawa-machi, Mogami-gun, Yamagata-ken 999-6401; Japan
- Coordinates: 38°44′14″N 140°08′46″E
- Operator: JR East
- Line: ■ Rikuu West Line
- Distance: 17.0 km from Shinjō
- Platforms: 1 island platform

Other information
- Website: www.jreast.co.jp/estation/station/info.aspx?StationCd=1389

History
- Opened: 7 December 1913

Passengers
- FY2018: 30 daily

Services
| Preceding station | JR East | Following station |
|---|---|---|
| Amarume One-way operation | Rikuu West Line Rapid Mogamigawa | Shinjō Terminus |
| Takaya towards Sakata | Rikuu West Line Rapid Mogamigawa | Tsuya One-way operation |
| Takaya towards Sakata | Rikuu West Line Local | Tsuya towards Shinjō |
Location
- Location within Yamagata Prefecture Location within Japan

Furukuchi Station (古口駅, Furukuchi-eki) is a railway station in the town of Tozawa, Yamagata, Japan, operated by East Japan Railway Company (JR East).

== Lines ==
Furukuchi Station is served by the Rikuu West Line between Shinjō and Amarume, and is located 17.0 km from the starting point of the line at Shinjō.

== Station layout ==
Furukuchi Station has one island platform, connected to the station building by a level crossing. The station is staffed.

=== Platforms ===
| 1 | ■ Rikuu West Line | for Amarume and Sakata |
| 2 | ■ Rikuu West Line | for Shinjō for Amarume and Sakata |

== History ==
Furukuchi Station opened on 7 December 1913.

== Passenger statistics ==
In fiscal 2018, the station was used by an average of 30 passengers daily (boarding passengers only). The passenger figures for previous years are as shown below.

| Fiscal year | Daily average |
|---|---|
| 2000 | 107 |
| 2005 | 75 |
| 2010 | 42 |
| 2015 | 32 |

== Surrounding area ==
- Mogami River
- Furukuchi Post Office
- Imagami Onsen

== See also ==
- List of railway stations in Japan
