= Shinjō Station =

Railway station in Shinjō, Yamagata Prefecture, Japan

Shinjō Station 新庄駅
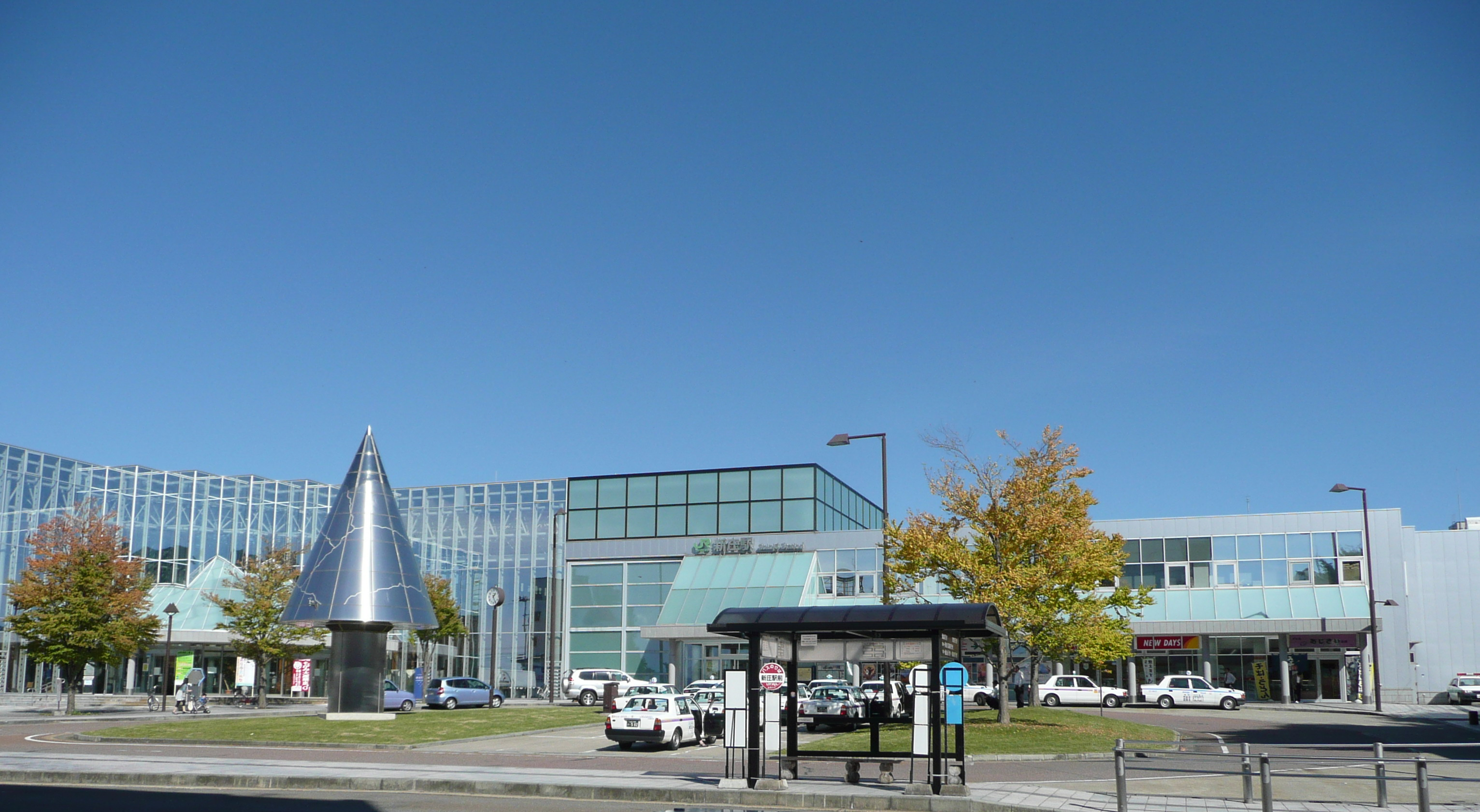
- Shinjō Station West Entrance in October 2010

General information
- Location: 1-1 Tamon-machi, Shinjō-shi, Yamagata-ken 996-0024; Japan
- Coordinates: 38°45′46″N 140°18′22″E
- Operator: JR East
- Lines: Yamagata Shinkansen; Ōu Main Line; Rikuu East Line; Rikuu West Line
- Distance: 421.4 km (261.8 mi) from Tokyo
- Platforms: 3 side + 1 island + 1 bay platform
- Tracks: 5

Construction
- Structure type: At grade

Other information
- Status: Staffed ( "Midori no Madoguchi" )
- Website: Official website

History
- Opened: 11 June 1903; 123 years ago

Passengers
- FY2018: 1,393 (daily)

Services
Preceding station	JR East	Following station
Ōishida towards Tokyo	Yamagata Shinkansen Tsubasa	Terminus
Funagata towards Fukushima	Yamagata Line	Terminus
Terminus	Ōu Main Line Local	Izumita towards Aomori
Furukuchi One-way operation	Rikuu West Line Rapid Mogamigawa	Terminus
Masukata towards Sakata	Rikuu West Line Rapid Mogamigawa	Terminus
Masukata towards Sakata	Rikuu West Line Local	Terminus
Terminus	Rikuu East Line	Minami-Shinjō towards Kogota
Location
- Location within Yamagata Prefecture Location within Japan

Shinjō Station (新庄駅, Shinjō-eki) is a railway station in the city of Shinjō, Yamagata, Japan, operated by East Japan Railway Company (JR East).

== Lines ==
Shinjō Station is served by the Ōu Main Line, and is the terminus for the Yamagata Shinkansen, Rikuu West Line and Rikuu East Line. It is 148.6 kilometers from Fukushima and 421.4 kilometers from Tokyo.

== Station layout ==
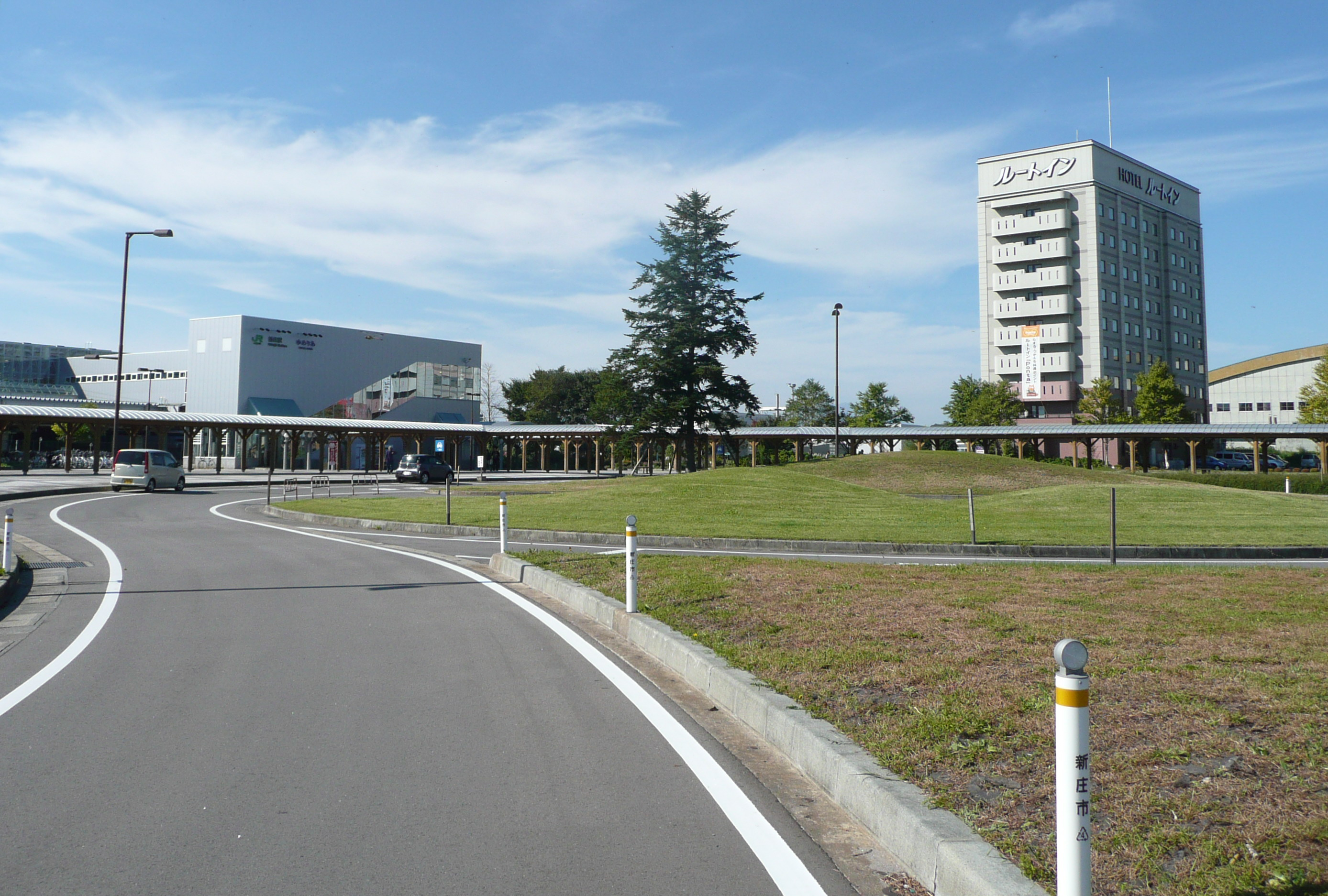
Shinjō Station East Entrance

Shinjō Station has one side platform and one island platform for the Yamagata Shinkansen. The Ōu Main Line uses half of this island platform, and one of two opposed side platforms. The other side platform is used by the Rikuu West Line. The Rikuu East line uses a notch in one of the side platforms, forming a bay platform. The station has a "Midori no Madoguchi" staffed ticket office and a View Plaza travel agency.

=== Platforms ===
1/2	■ Yamagata Shinkansen	for Yamagata, Fukushima, and Tokyo
1/2	■ Ou Main Line	for Ōishida, Murayama, Tendō, and Yamagata
3	■ Rikuu West Line	for Furukuchi, Karikawa, Amarume, and Sakata
3	■ Ou Main Line	for Yuzawa, Yokote, Ōmagari, and Akita
4	■ Ou Main Line	for Yuzawa, Yokote, Ōmagari, and Akita
5	■ Rikuu East Line	for Naruko-Onsen, Furukawa, and Kogota
5	■ Rikuu West Line	for Furukuchi, Karikawa, Amarume, and Sakata

- Platforms 1 and 2 serve 1,435 mm (4 ft 8 1/2 in) standard gauge tracks, while platforms 3 to 5 serve narrow gauge (1,067 mm) tracks.
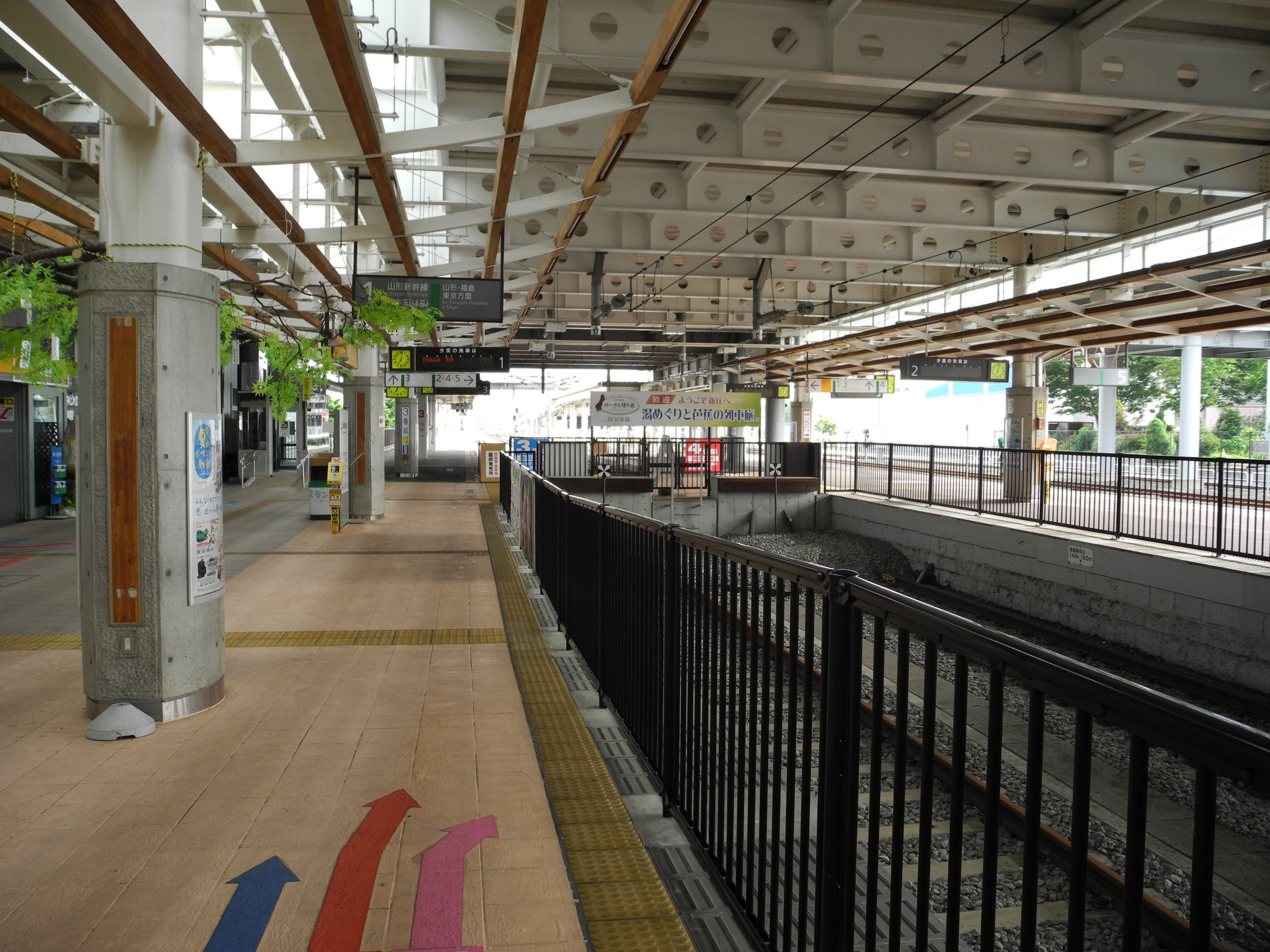
Platforms 1 and 2, July 2011

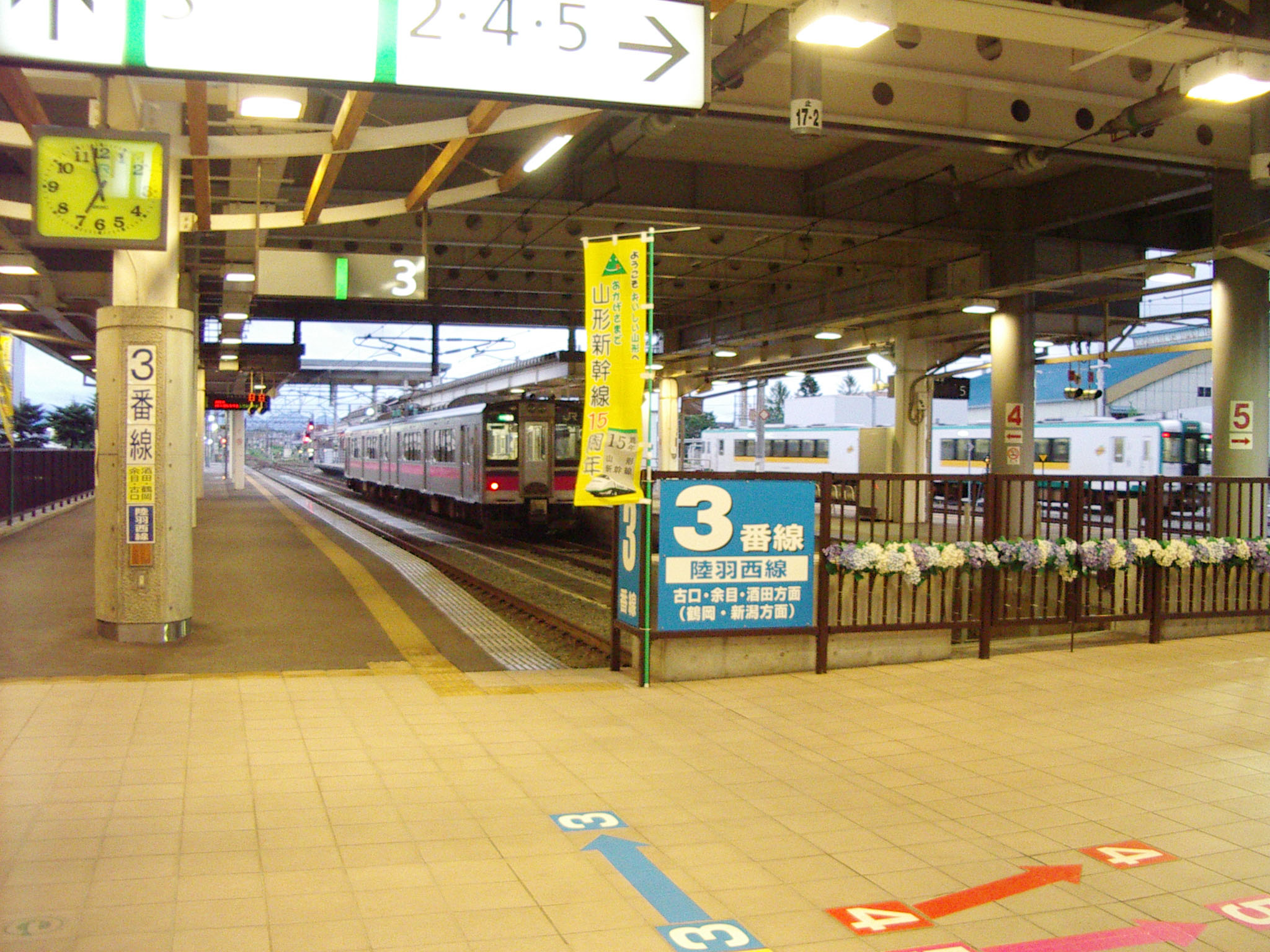
Platform 3, July 2007

== History ==
Shinjō Station opened on 11 June 1903. The station was absorbed into the JR East network upon the privatization of JNR on 1 April 1987. A new station building was completed in October 1998. From 4 December 1999, the station became the terminus of the Yamagata Shinkansen, following its extension from Yamagata.

== Passenger statistics ==
In fiscal 2018, the station was used by an average of 1,393 passengers daily (boarding passengers only). The passenger figures for previous years are as shown below.

Fiscal year	Daily average
2000	2,373
2005	1,960
2010	1,593
2015	1,481

== Surrounding area ==
- Shinjō City Hall
- Shinjō Post Office
- National Route 13
- National Route 47
