= Uzen-Tsubaki Station =

Railway station in Iide, Yamagata Prefecture, Japan

Uzen-Tsubaki Station 羽前椿駅
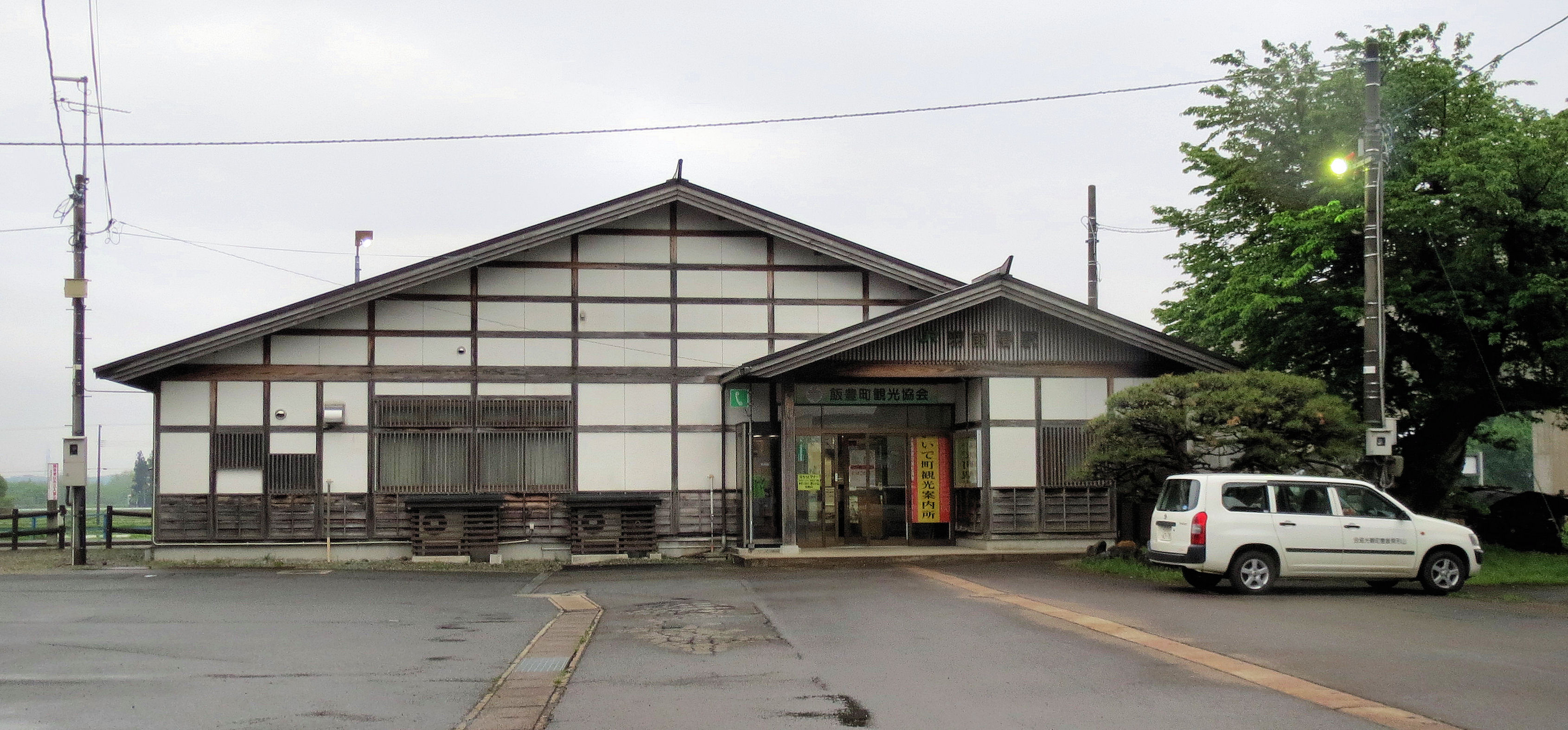
- Uzen-Tsubaki Station in May 2013

General information
- Location: 1974-2 Tsubaki, Iide-machi, Nishiokitama-gun, Yamagata-ken 999-0604; Japan
- Coordinates: 38°2′18.91″N 139°59′39.09″E
- Operator: JR East
- Line: ■ Yonesaka Line
- Distance: 30.1 km from Yonezawa
- Platforms: 2 side platforms

Other information
- Status: Staffed
- Website: Official website

History
- Opened: August 10, 1931

Passengers
- FY2018: 25

Services
Preceding station	JR East	Following station
Tenoko towards Sakamachi	Yonesaka Line	Hagyū towards Yonezawa
Location
- Location within Yamagata Prefecture Location within Japan

Uzen-Tsubaki Station (羽前椿駅, Uzen-Tsubaki-eki) is a railway station in the town of Iide, Yamagata Prefecture, Japan, operated by East Japan Railway Company (JR East).

== Lines ==
Uzen-Tsubaki Station is served by the Yonesaka Line, and is located 30.1 rail kilometers from the terminus of the line at Yonezawa Station.

== Station layout ==
The station has two opposed side platforms connected to the station building by a footbridge. The station is staffed.

=== Platforms ===
1	■ Yonesaka Line	for Imaizumi and Yonezawa
2	■ Yonesaka Line	for Oguni and Sakamachi

== History ==
Uzen-Tsubaki Station opened on August 10, 1931. The station was absorbed into the JR East network upon the privatization of JNR on April 1, 1987. The current station building dates from December 1995.

== Passenger statistics ==
In fiscal 2018, the station was used by an average of 25 passengers daily (boarding passengers only),

== Surrounding area ==
- National Route 113

== See also ==
- List of railway stations in Japan
