= Echigo-Kanamaru Station =

Railway station in Sekikawa, Niigata Prefecture, Japan

Echigo-Kanamaru Station 越後金丸駅
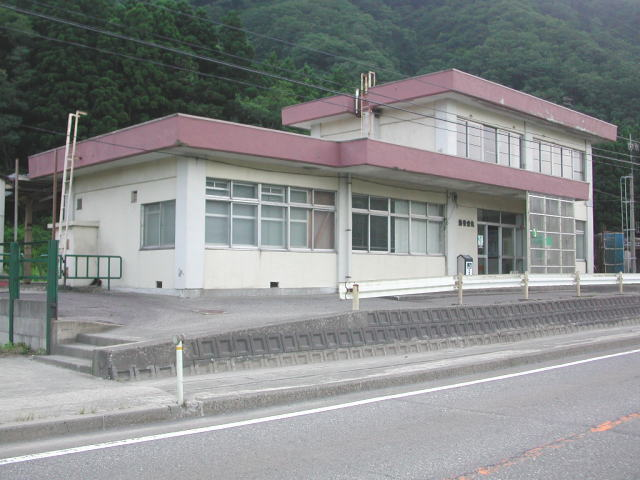
- Echigo-Kanamaru Station in August 2004

General information
- Location: Kanamaru, Sekikawa-mura, Iwafune-gun, Niigata-ken 959-3228; Japan
- Coordinates: 38°4′0.08″N 139°39′48.71″E
- Operator: JR East
- Line: ■ Yonesaka Line
- Distance: 67.8 km from Yonezawa
- Platforms: 2 side platforms
- Tracks: 2

Other information
- Status: Unstaffed
- Website: Official website

History
- Opened: 30 November 1933

Services
| Preceding station | JR East | Following station |
|---|---|---|
| Echigo-Katakai towards Sakamachi | Yonesaka Line | Oguni towards Yonezawa |
Location
- Location within Japan

Echigo-Kanamaru Station (越後金丸駅, Echigo-Kanamaru-eki) is a railway station in the village of Sekikawa, Niigata Prefecture, Japan, operated by East Japan Railway Company (JR East).

== Lines ==
Echigo-Kanamaru Station is served by the Yonesaka Line, and is located 67.8 rail kilometers from the terminus of the line at Yonezawa Station.

== Station layout ==
The station had two opposed ground-level side platforms connected to the station building by a footbridge. Sometime in early 2018 the switch's (severed north and south of the station) connecting to the side track which serviced the western platform was removed and the footbridge taken down while the eastern platform is still in use. The station is unattended.

=== Platforms ===
| 1 | ■ Yonesaka Line | for Oguni, Iwaizumi and Yonezawa |
| 2 | ■ Yonesaka Line | for Echigo-Shimoseki and Sakamachi |

== History ==
Echigo-Kanamaru Station opened on 30 November 1933. The station was absorbed into the JR East network upon the privatization of JNR on 1 April 1987.

== Surrounding area ==
- National Route 113
- Sekikawa village hall

== See also ==
- List of railway stations in Japan
