= Nishi-Yonezawa Station =

Railway station in Yonezawa, Yamagata Prefecture, Japan

Nishi-Yonezawa Station 西米沢駅
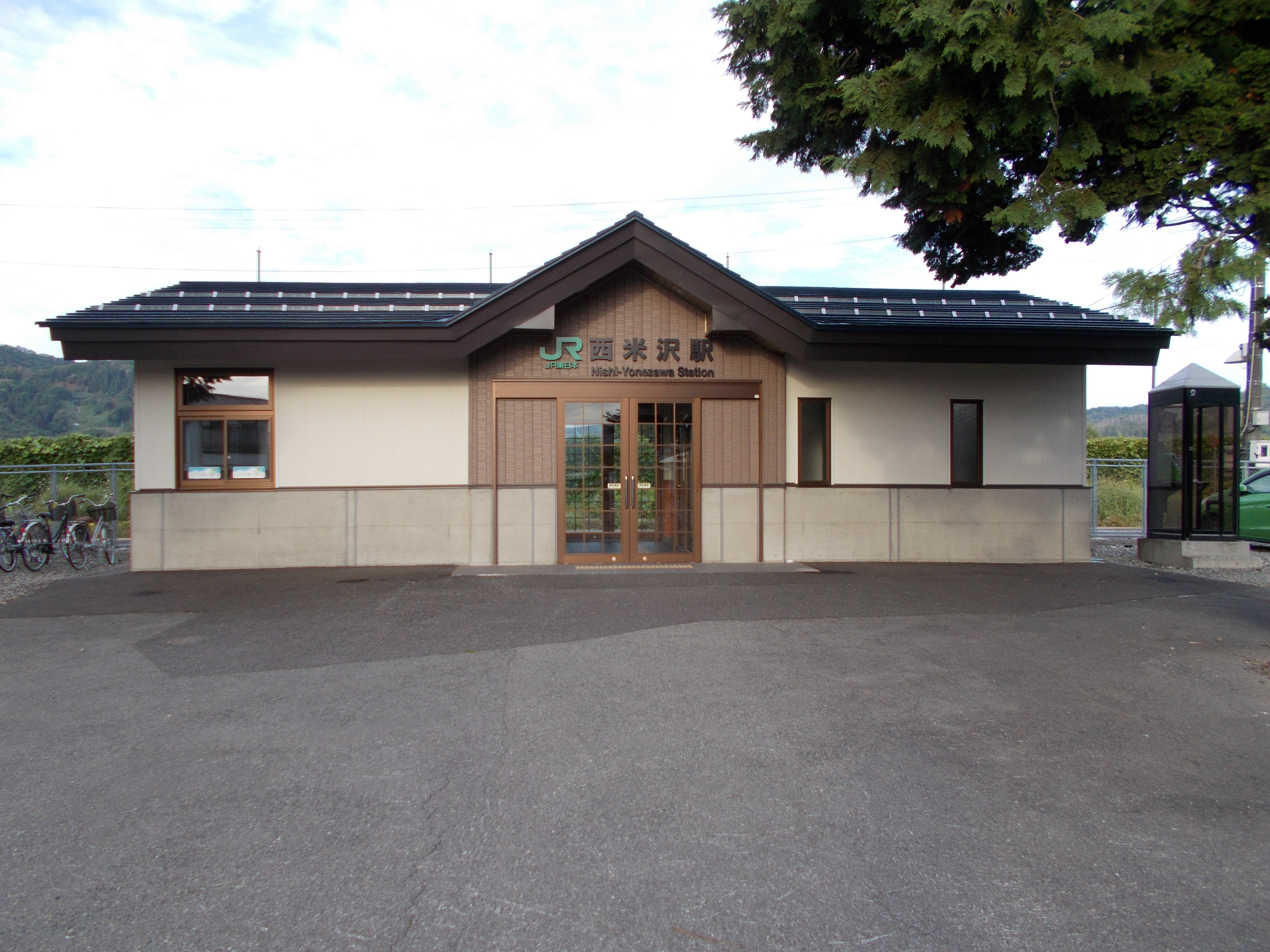
- Nishi-Yonezawa Station in August 2018

General information
- Location: 4-92 Naoe-cho, Yonezawa-shi, Yamagata-ken 992-0056; Japan
- Coordinates: 37°55′02″N 140°05′05″E
- Operator: JR East
- Line: ■ Yonesaka Line
- Distance: 6.5 km from Yonezawa
- Platforms: 1 side platform

Other information
- Status: Unstaffed
- Website: Official website

History
- Opened: September 28, 1926

Services
Preceding station	JR East	Following station
Narushima towards Sakamachi	Yonesaka Line	Minami-Yonezawa towards Yonezawa
Location
- Location within Yamagata Prefecture Location within Japan

Nishi-Yonezawa Station (西米沢駅, Nishi-Yonezawa-eki) is a railway station in the city of Yonezawa, Yamagata Prefecture, Japan, operated by East Japan Railway Company (JR East).

== Lines ==
Nishi-Yonezawa Station is served by the Yonesaka Line, and is located 6.5 rail kilometers from the terminus of the line at Yonezawa Station.

== Station layout ==
The station has one side platform serving a single bi-directional track. The station is unattended.

== History ==
Nishi-Yonezawa Station opened on September 28, 1926. The station was absorbed into the JR East network upon the privatization of JNR on April 1, 1987.

== Surrounding area ==
- Yonezawa Uesugi clan cemetery (National Historic Site)

== See also ==
- List of railway stations in Japan
