= Hagyū Station =

Railway station in Iide, Yamagata Prefecture, Japan

Hagyū Station 萩生駅
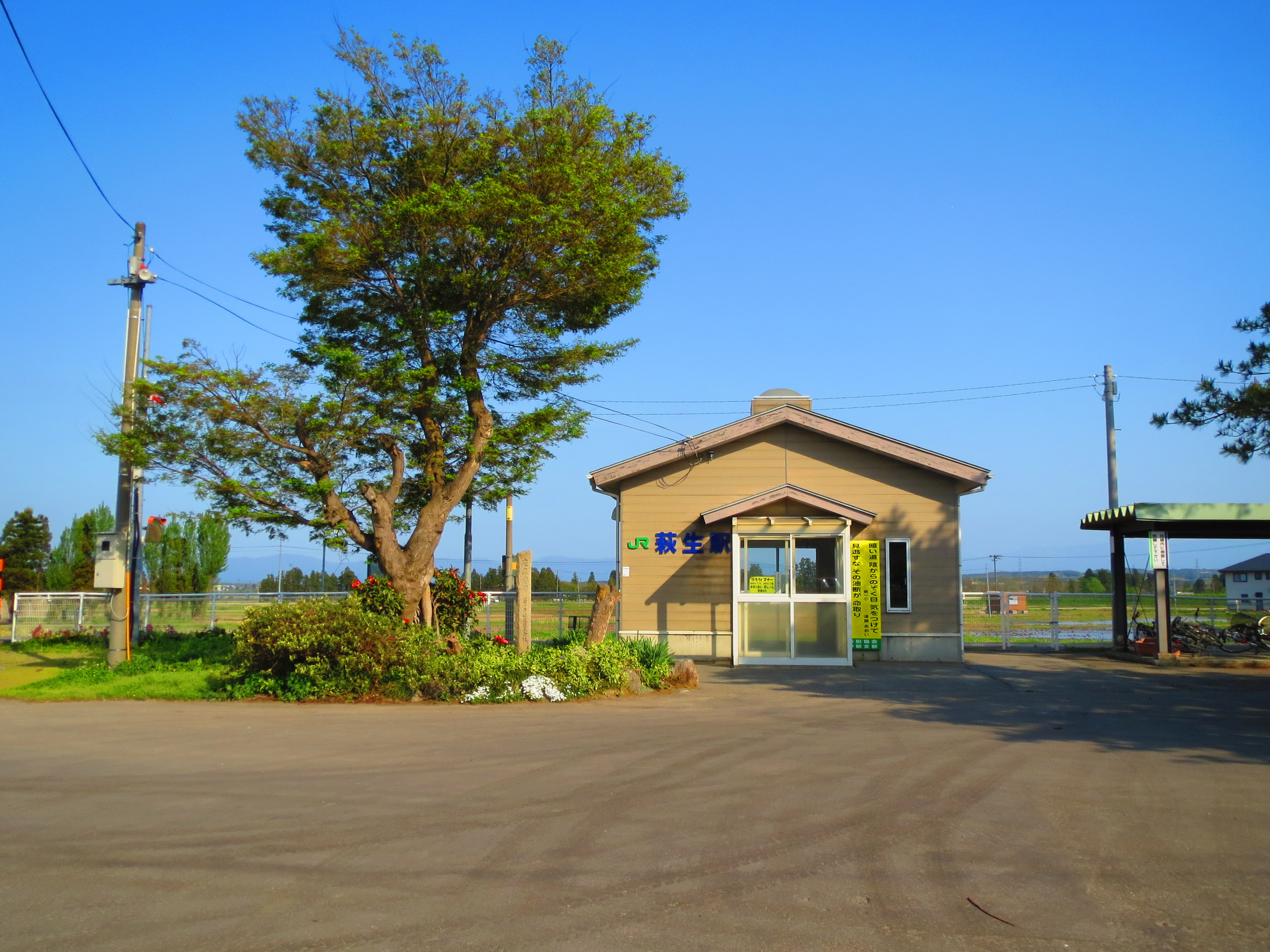
- Hagyū Station in May 2013

General information
- Location: Hagyū, Iide-machi, Nishiokitama-gun, Yamagata-ken; Japan
- Coordinates: 38°3′43.86″N 140°0′15.79″E
- Operator: JR East
- Line: ■ Yonesaka Line
- Distance: 27.3 km from Yonezawa
- Platforms: 1 side platform

Other information
- Status: Unstaffed
- Website: Official website

History
- Opened: August 10, 1931

Services
Preceding station	JR East	Following station
Uzen-Tsubaki towards Sakamachi	Yonesaka Line	Imaizumi towards Yonezawa
Location
- Location within Yamagata Prefecture Location within Japan

Hagyū Station (萩生駅, Hagyū-eki) is a railway station in the town of Iide, Yamagata Prefecture, Japan, operated by East Japan Railway Company (JR East).

== Lines ==
Hagyū Station is served by the Yonesaka Line, and is located 27.3 rail kilometers from the terminus of the line at Yonezawa Station.

== Station layout ==
The station has one side platform serving s single bi-directional track. The station is unattended.

== History ==
Hagyū Station opened on August 10, 1931. The station was absorbed into the JR East network upon the privatization of JNR on April 1, 1987.

== Surrounding area ==
The station is located in a rural area, with only one small convenience store located in the close vicinity.

== See also ==
- List of railway stations in Japan
