= Chūgun Station =

Railway station in Kawanishi, Yamagata Prefecture, Japan

Coordinates: 37°58′09″N 140°04′02″E

Chūgun Station 中郡駅
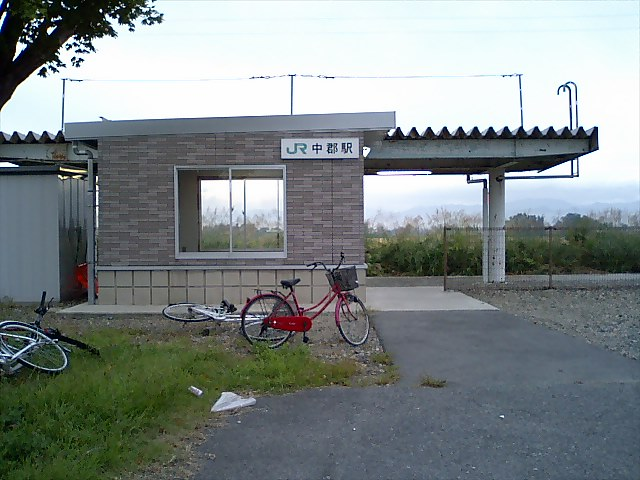
- Chūgun Station in September 2009

General information
- Location: Tokida 51, Kawanishi-machi, Higashiokitama-gun, Yamagata-ken 999-0144; Japan
- Operator: JR East
- Line: ■ Yonesaka Line
- Distance: 12.5 km from Yonezawa
- Platforms: 1 side platform

Other information
- Status: Unstaffed
- Website: Official website

History
- Opened: September 28, 1926

Passengers
- FY2004: 41

Services
Preceding station	JR East	Following station
Uzen-Komatsu towards Sakamachi	Yonesaka Line	Narushima towards Yonezawa
Location
- Location within Yamagata Prefecture Location within Japan

Chūgun Station (中郡駅, Chūgun-eki) is a railway station in the town of Kawanishi, Yamagata Prefecture, Japan, operated by the East Japan Railway Company (JR East).

== History ==
Chūgun Station opened on September 28, 1926. The station was absorbed into the JR East network upon the privatization of JNR on 1 April 1987. A new station building was completed in March 2001. The name comes from a settlement absorbed into Kawanishi.

== Lines ==
The station is served by the Yonesaka Line, and is located 12.5 rail kilometers from the terminus of the line at Yonezawa Station.

== Station layout ==
The station has one side platform serving a single bi-directional track. The station is unattended.

== Surrounding area ==
- National Route 287

== See also ==
- List of railway stations in Japan
