= Echigo-Shimoseki Station =

Railway station in Sekikawa, Niigata Prefecture, Japan

Echigo-Shimoseki Station 越後下関駅
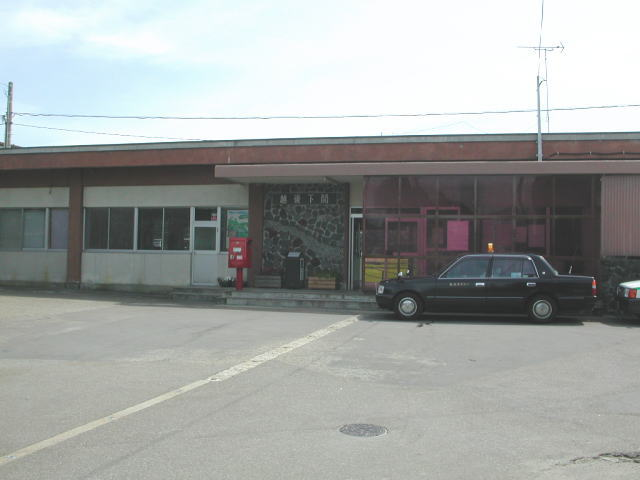
- Echigo-Shimoseki Station in August 2004

General information
- Location: Shimoseki, Sekikawa-mura, Iwafune-gun, Niigata-ken 959-3265; Japan
- Coordinates: 38°5′24.28″N 139°33′35.70″E
- Operator: JR East
- Line: ■ Yonesaka Line
- Distance: 79.7 km from Yonezawa
- Platforms: 2 side platforms
- Tracks: 2

Other information
- Status: unstaffed station
- Website: Official website

History
- Opened: 10 August 1931

Passengers
- FY2021: 69

Services
Preceding station	JR East	Following station
Echigo-Ōshima towards Sakamachi	Yonesaka Line	Echigo-Katakai towards Yonezawa
Location
- Location within Japan

Echigo-Shimoseki Station (越後下関駅, Echigo-Shimoseki-eki) is a railway station on the Yonesaka Line in the village of Sekikawa, Niigata Prefecture, Japan, operated by East Japan Railway Company (JR East).

== Lines ==
Echigo-Shimoseki Station is served by the Yonesaka Line, and is located 79.7 kilometers from the terminus of the line at Yonezawa Station.

== Station layout ==
The station has two opposed ground-level side platforms connected to the station building by a footbridge.

=== Platforms ===
1	■ Yonesaka Line	for Oguni, Iwaizumi, and Yonezawa
2	■ Yonesaka Line	for Sakamachi

== History ==
Echigo-Shimoseki Station opened on 10 August 1931. The station was absorbed into the JR East network upon the privatization of JNR on 1 April 1987.

== Passenger statistics ==
In fiscal 2017, the station was used by an average of 90 passengers daily (boarding passengers only).

== Surrounding area ==
- National Route 113
- Sekikawa village hall
- Sekikawa Post Office

== See also ==
- List of railway stations in Japan
