= Uzen-Numazawa Station =

Railway station in Oguni, Yamagata Prefecture, Japan

Uzen-Numazawa Station 羽前沼沢駅
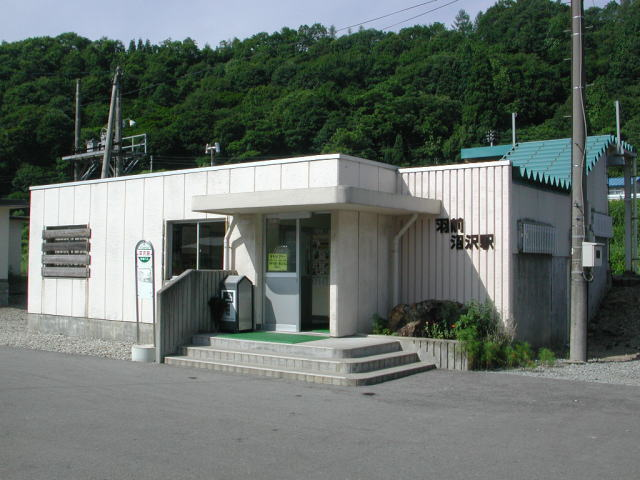
- Uzen-Numazawa Station in August 2004

General information
- Location: Numazawa, Oguni-machi, Nishiokitama-gun, Yamagata-ken 999-1201; Japan
- Coordinates: 38°1′43.01″N 139°52′20.87″E
- Operator: JR East
- Line: ■ Yonesaka Line
- Distance: 43.9 km from Yonezawa
- Platforms: 1 side platform

Other information
- Status: Unstaffed
- Website: Official website

History
- Opened: November 10, 1933

Services
Preceding station	JR East	Following station
Isaryō towards Sakamachi	Yonesaka Line	Tenoko towards Yonezawa
Location
- Location within Yamagata Prefecture Location within Japan

Uzen-Numazawa Station (羽前沼沢駅, Uzen-Numazawa-eki) is a railway station in the town of Oguni, Yamagata Prefecture, Japan, operated by East Japan Railway Company (JR East).

== Lines ==
Uzen-Numazawa Station is served by the Yonesaka Line, and is located 43.9 rail kilometers from the terminus of the line at Yonezawa Station.

== Station layout ==
The station has one side platform serving a single bi-directional track. The station is unattended.

== History ==
Uzen-Numazawa Station opened on November 10, 1933. The current station building dates from 1984. The station was absorbed into the JR East network upon the privatization of JNR on 1 April 1987.

== Surrounding area ==
- National Route 113

== See also ==
- List of railway stations in Japan
