= Oguni =

Oguni may refer to:

- Oguni, Kumamoto, a town in Kumamoto Prefecture, Japan
- Oguni, Niigata, a former town in Niigata Prefecture, Japan
- Oguni, Yamagata, a town in Yamagata Prefecture, Japan
- Oguni Station, a railway station in Oguni, Yamagata Prefecture

== People with the surname ==
- Hideo Oguni (小国 英雄, 1904–1996), Japanese writer
- Yukinori Oguni (小國 以載, born 1988), Japanese boxer
