= Tenoko Station =

Railway station in Iide, Yamagata Prefecture, Japan

Tenoko Station 手ノ子駅
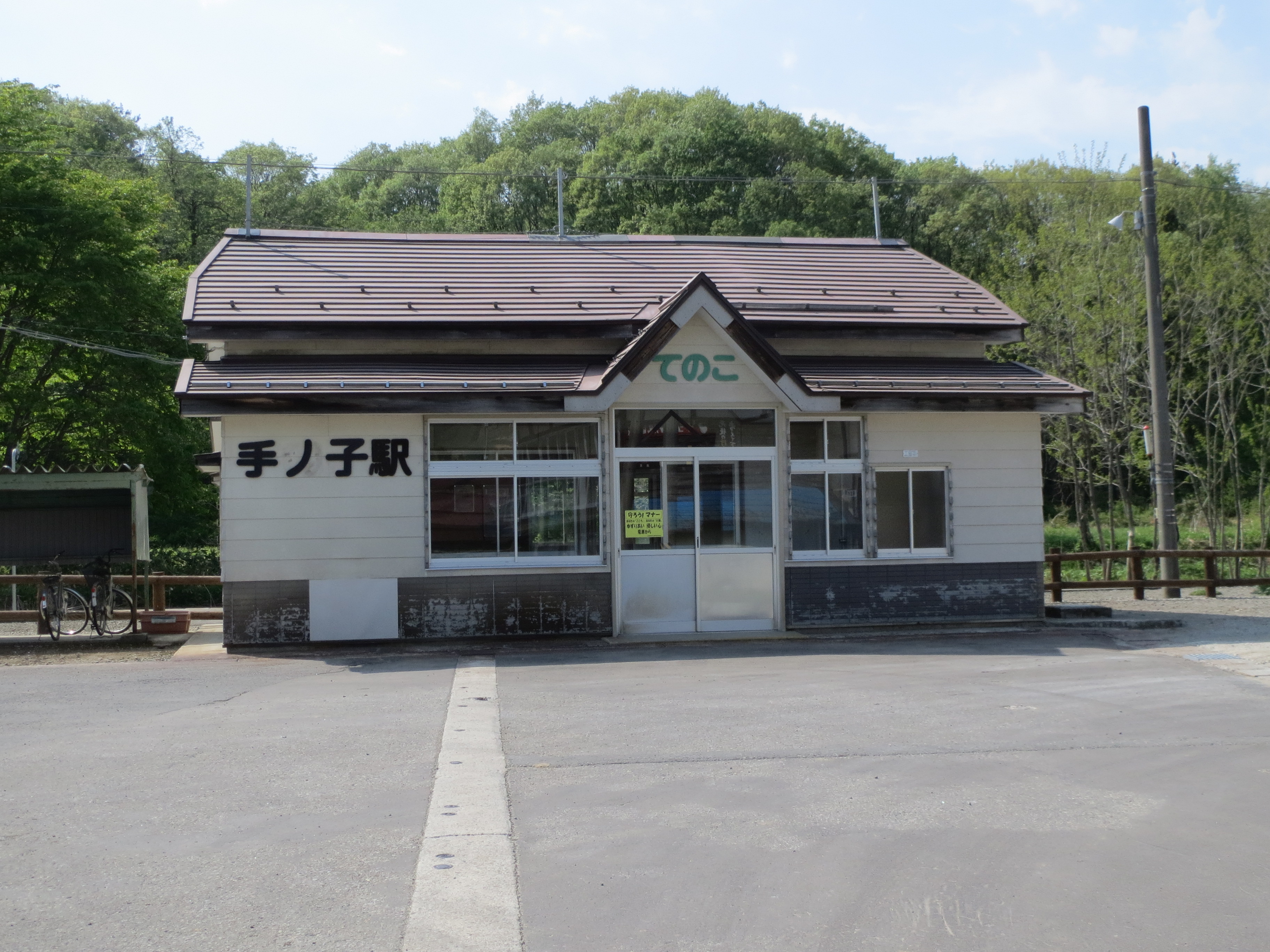
- Tenoko Station in May 2013

General information
- Location: Tenoko, Iide-machi, Nishiokitama-gun, Yamagata-ken 999-1111; Japan
- Coordinates: 38°0′42.46″N 139°57′40.75″E
- Operator: JR East
- Line: ■ Yonesaka Line
- Distance: 34.7 km from Yonezawa
- Platforms: 1 side platform

Other information
- Status: Unstaffed
- Website: Official website

History
- Opened: August 10, 1931

Services
Preceding station	JR East	Following station
Uzen-Numazawa towards Sakamachi	Yonesaka Line	Uzen-Tsubaki towards Yonezawa
Location
- Location within Yamagata Prefecture Location within Japan

Tenoko Station (手ノ子駅, Tenoko-eki) is a railway station in the town of Iide, Yamagata Prefecture, Japan, operated by East Japan Railway Company (JR East).

== Lines ==
Tenoko Station is served by the Yonesaka Line, and is located 34.7 rail kilometers from the terminus of the line at Yonezawa Station.

== Station layout ==
The station has one side platform serving a single bi-directional track. The station is unattended.

== History ==
Tenoko Station opened on August 10, 1931. The station was absorbed into the JR East network upon the privatization of JNR on April 1, 1987.

== Surrounding area ==
- National Route 113

== See also ==
- List of railway stations in Japan
