= Isaryō Station =

Railway station in Oguni, Yamagata Prefecture, Japan

Isaryō Station 伊佐領駅
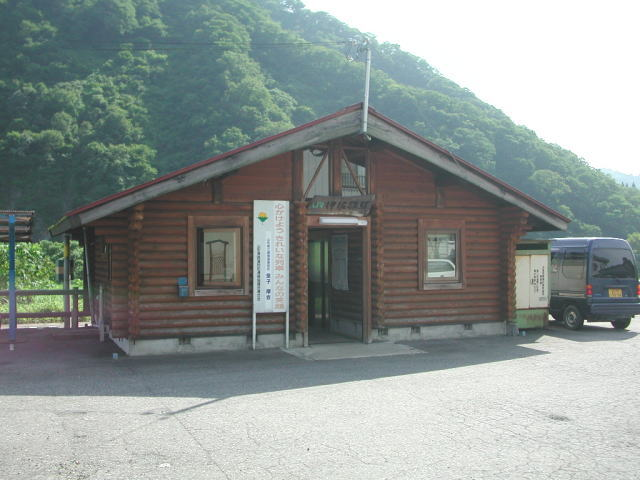
- Isaryō Station in August 2004

General information
- Location: Isaryō, Oguni-machi, Nishiokitama-gun, Yamagata-ken 999-1322; Japan
- Coordinates: 38°3′3.77″N 139°49′22.02″E
- Operator: JR East
- Line: ■ Yonesaka Line
- Distance: 50.0 km from Yonezawa
- Platforms: 1 side platform

Other information
- Status: Unstaffed
- Website: Official website

History
- Opened: October 30, 1935

Services
Preceding station	JR East	Following station
Uzen-Matsuoka towards Sakamachi	Yonesaka Line	Uzen-Numazawa towards Yonezawa
Location
- Location within Yamagata Prefecture Location within Japan

Isaryō Station (伊佐領駅, Isaryō-eki) is a railway station in the town of Oguni, Yamagata Prefecture, Japan, operated by East Japan Railway Company (JR East).

== Lines ==
Isaryō Station is served by the Yonesaka Line, and is located 50.0 kilometers (31.1 mi) (rail) from the terminus of the line at Yonezawa Station.

== Station layout ==
The station has one side platform serving a single bi-directional track. The station is unattended.

== History ==
Isaryō Station opened on October 30, 1935. The station was absorbed into the JR East network upon the privatization of JNR on 1 April 1987. The current station building dates from December 1993.

== Surrounding area ==
- National Route 113
- Isaryō Post Office

== See also ==
- List of railway stations in Japan
