= Uzen-Matsuoka Station =

Railway station in Oguni, Yamagata Prefecture, Japan

Uzen-Matsuoka Station 羽前松岡駅
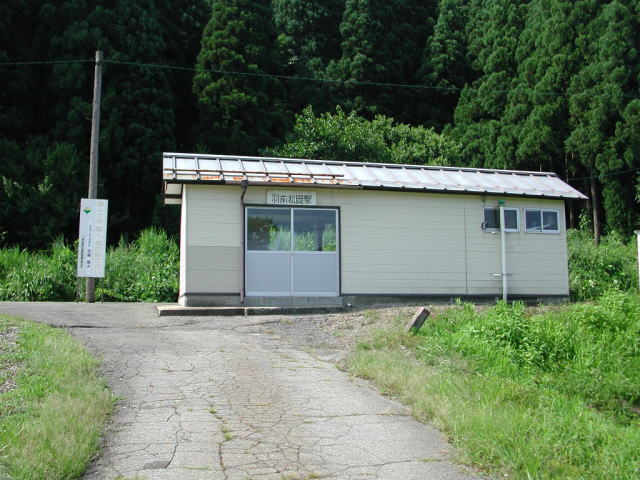
- Uzen-Matsuoka Station in August 2004

General information
- Location: Matsuoka, Oguni-machi, Nishiokitama-gun, Yamagata-ken; Japan
- Coordinates: 38°2′43.14″N 139°46′49.80″E
- Operator: JR East
- Line: ■ Yonesaka Line
- Distance: 54.7 km from Yonezawa
- Platforms: 1 side platform

Other information
- Status: Unstaffed
- Website: Official website

History
- Opened: October 30, 1935

Services
Preceding station	JR East	Following station
Oguni towards Sakamachi	Yonesaka Line	Isaryō towards Yonezawa
Location
- Location within Yamagata Prefecture Location within Japan

Uzen-Matsuoka Station (羽前松岡駅, Uzen-Matsuoka-eki) is a railway station in the town of Oguni, Yamagata Prefecture, Japan, operated by East Japan Railway Company (JR East).

== Lines ==
Uzen-Matsuoka Station is served by the Yonesaka Line, and is located 54.7 rail kilometers from the terminus of the line at Yonezawa Station.

== Station layout ==
The station has one side platform serving a single bi-directional track. The station is unattended.

== History ==
Uzen-Matsuoka Station opened on October 30, 1935. The station was absorbed into the JR East network upon the privatization of JNR on 1 April 1987.

== Surrounding area ==
- National Route 113

== See also ==
- List of railway stations in Japan
