= Echigo-Ōshima Station =

Railway station in Sekikawa, Niigata Prefecture, Japan

Echigo-Ōshima Station 越後大島駅
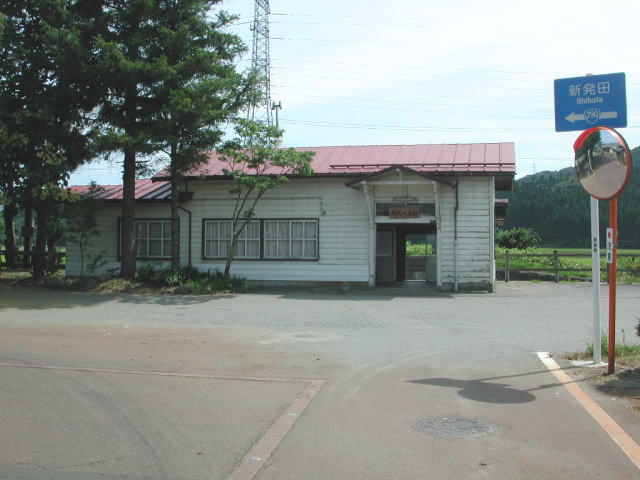
- Echigo-Ōshima Station in August 2004

General information
- Location: Tsuchisawa, Sekikawa-mura, Iwafune-gun, Niigata-ken 959-3200; Japan
- Coordinates: 38°05′59″N 139°31′05″E
- Operator: JR East
- Line: ■ Yonesaka Line
- Distance: 83.5 km from Yonezawa
- Platforms: 1 side platform
- Connections: 1

Other information
- Status: Unstaffed
- Website: www.jreast.co.jp/estation/station/info.aspx?StationCd=267

History
- Opened: 10 August 1931

Services
Preceding station	JR East	Following station
Sakamachi Terminus	Yonesaka Line	Echigo-Shimoseki towards Yonezawa
Location
- Location within Japan

Echigo-Ōshima Station (越後大島駅, Echigo-Ōshima-eki) is a railway station in the village of Sekikawa, Niigata Prefecture, Japan, operated by East Japan Railway Company (JR East).

== Lines ==
Echigo-Ōshima Station is served by the Yonesaka Line, and is located 83.5 rail kilometers from the terminus of the line at Yonezawa Station.

== Station layout ==
The station has one ground-level side platform serving a single bi-directional track. The station is unattended.

== History ==
Echigo-Ōshima Station opened on 10 August 1931. The station was absorbed into the JR East network upon the privatization of JNR on 1 April 1987.

== Surrounding area ==
- National Route 113

== See also ==
- List of railway stations in Japan
