= Minami-Yonezawa Station =

Railway station in Yonezawa, Yamagata Prefecture, Japan

Minami-Yonezawa Station 南米沢駅
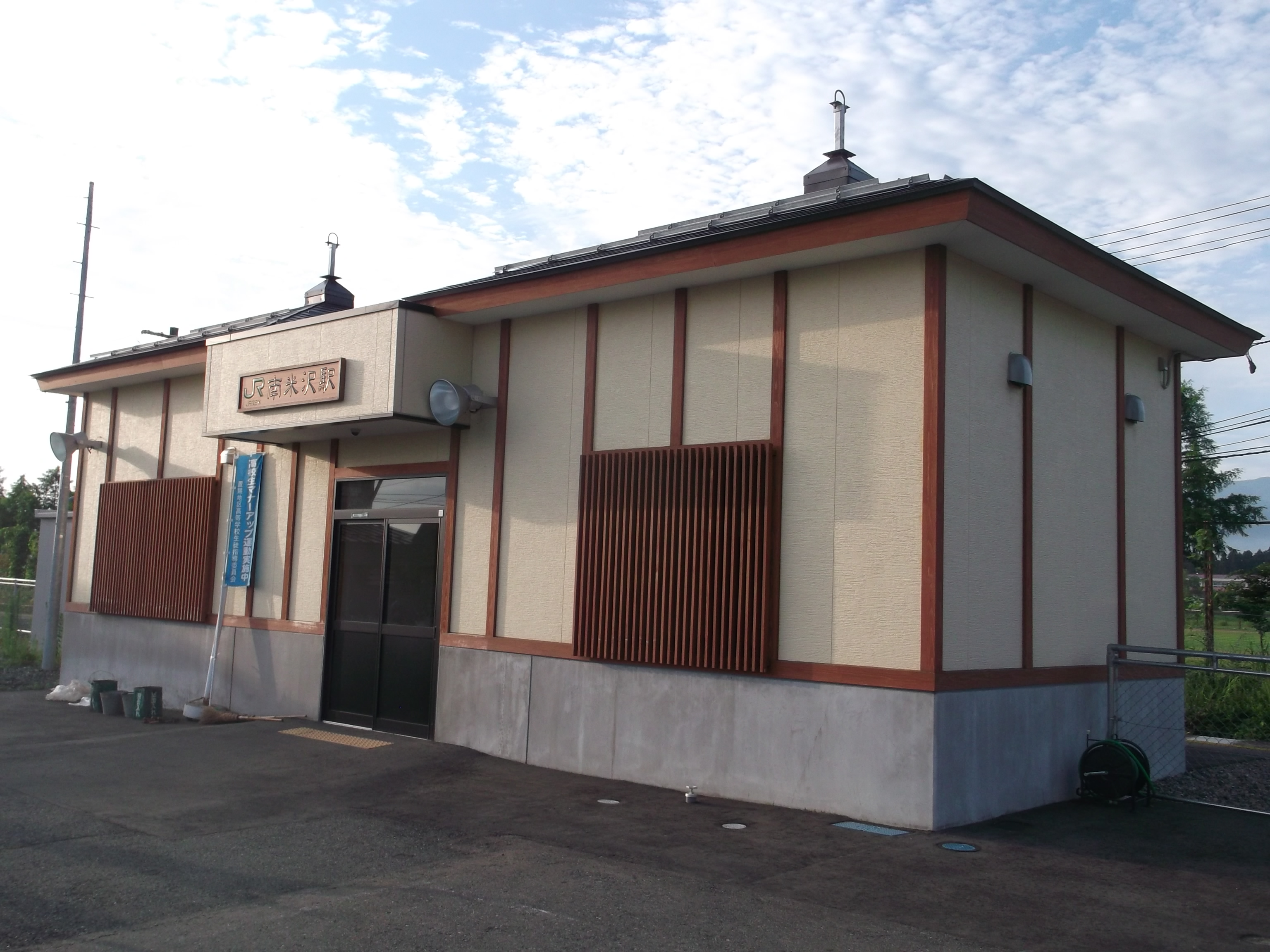
- Minami-Yonezawa Station in August 2013

General information
- Location: 1-6 Honchō, Yonezawa-shi, Yamagata-ken 992-0037; Japan
- Coordinates: 37°53′46″N 140°06′30″E
- Operator: JR East
- Line: ■ Yonesaka Line
- Distance: 3.1 km from Yonezawa
- Platforms: 1 side platform

Other information
- Status: Unstaffed
- Website: Official website

History
- Opened: September 28, 1926

Services
Preceding station	JR East	Following station
Nishi-Yonezawa towards Sakamachi	Yonesaka Line	Yonezawa Terminus
Location
- Location within Yamagata Prefecture Location within Japan

Minami-Yonezawa Station (南米沢駅, Minami-Yonezawa-eki) is a railway station in the city of Yonezawa, Yamagata Prefecture, Japan, operated by East Japan Railway Company (JR East).

== Lines ==
Minami-Yonezawa Station is served by the Yonesaka Line, and is located 3.1 rail kilometers from the terminus of the line at Yonezawa Station.

== Station layout ==
The station has a single side platform serving traffic in both directions. The station is unattended.

== History ==
Minami-Yonezawa Station opened on September 28, 1926. The station was absorbed into the JR East network upon the privatization of JNR on 1 April 1987. A new station building was completed in May 2011.

== Surrounding area ==
- Yonezawa Jonan Post Office
- Yamagata University Yonezawa campus

== See also ==
- List of railway stations in Japan
