= Narushima Station (Yamagata) =

Railway station in Yonezawa, Yamagata Prefecture, Japan

Narushima Station 成島駅
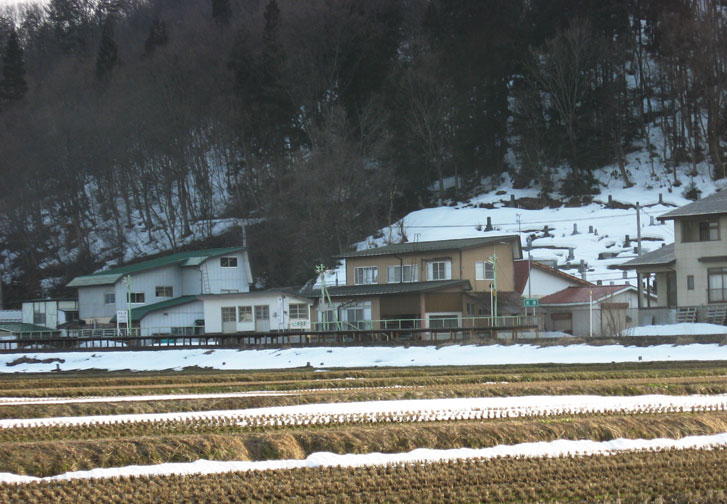
- Narushima Station in March 2007

General information
- Location: Narushima Yabusame, Yonezawa-shi, Yamagata-ken; Japan
- Coordinates: 37°56′36″N 140°04′32″E
- Operator: JR East
- Line: ■ Yonesaka Line
- Distance: 9.6 km from Yonezawa
- Platforms: side platform

Other information
- Status: Unstaffed
- Website: Official website

History
- Opened: 7 July 1961

Services
Preceding station	JR East	Following station
Chūgun towards Sakamachi	Yonesaka Line	Nishi-Yonezawa towards Yonezawa
Location
- Location within Yamagata Prefecture Location within Japan

Narushima Station (成島駅, Narushima-eki) is a railway station in the city of Yonezawa, Yamagata Prefecture, Japan, operated by East Japan Railway Company (JR East).

== Lines ==
Narushima Station is served by the Yonesaka Line, and is located 9.6 rail kilometers from the terminus of the line at Yonezawa Station.

== Station layout ==
The station has a single ground-level side platform serving a single bi-directional line. The station building is a shelter built directly on the platform. The station is unattended.

== History ==
Narushima Station opened on 7 July 1961. The station was absorbed into the JR East network upon the privatization of JNR on 1 April 1987.

== Surrounding area ==
- National Route 287
- Dai Roku Middle School
- Hirohata Elementary School

== See also ==
- List of railway stations in Japan
