= Narushima Station =

Narushima Station is the name of multiple train stations in Japan.

- Narushima Station (Gunma) - (成島駅) in Gunma Prefecture
- Narushima Station (Yamagata) - (成島駅) in Yamagata Prefecture
