= Oitama Station =

Railway station in Yonezawa, Yamagata Prefecture, Japan

Oitama Station 置賜駅
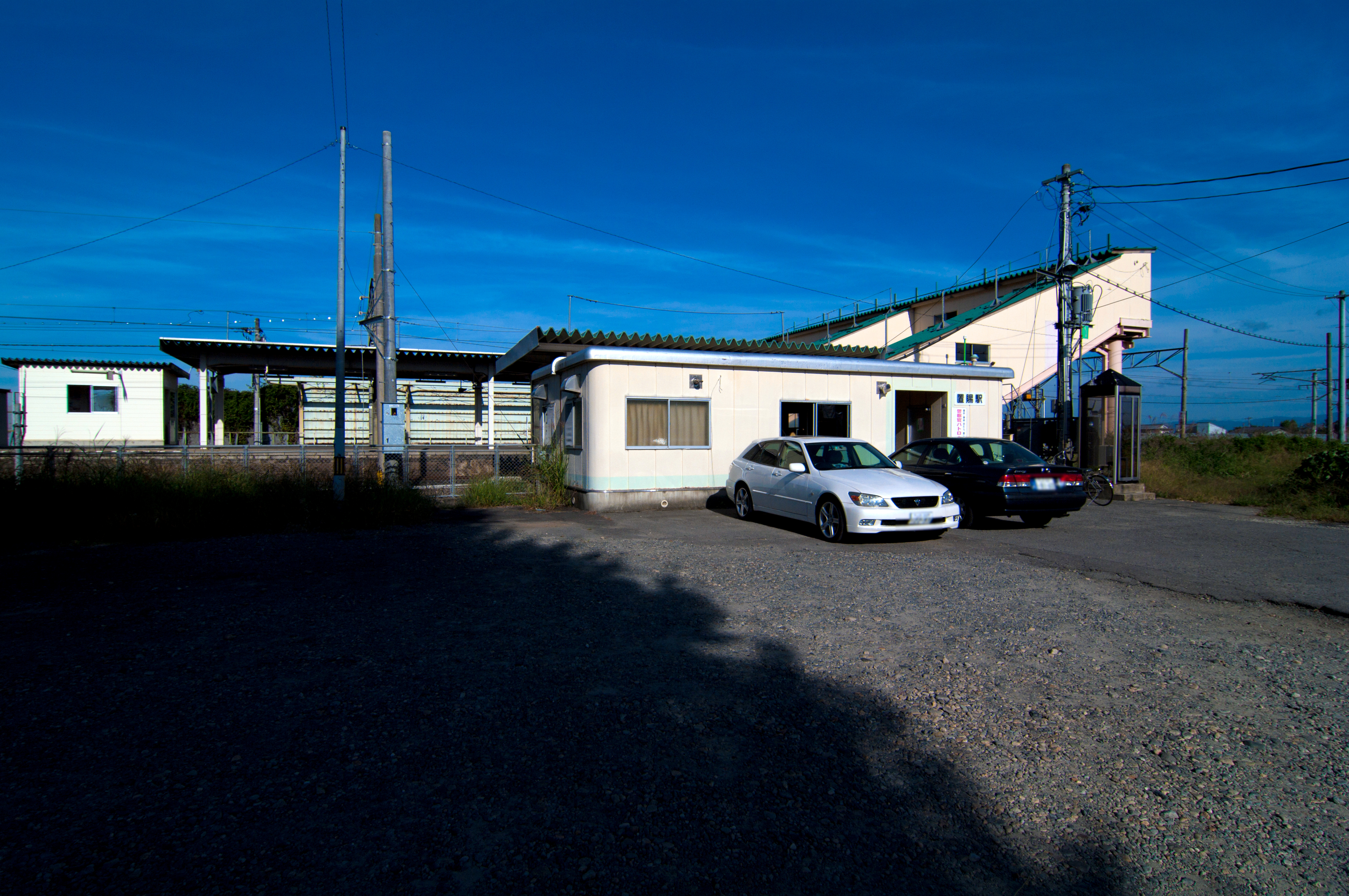
- Oitama Station, October 2010

General information
- Location: 633 Asagawa Kitsunezuka, Yonezawa-shi, Yamagata-ken 992-0111; Japan
- Coordinates: 37°57′16″N 140°08′34″E
- Line: ■ Ōu Main Line
- Distance: 45.6 km from Fukushima
- Platforms: 2 side platforms

Other information
- Status: Unstaffed
- Website: Official website

History
- Opened: December 20, 1917

Services
Preceding station	JR East	Following station
Yonezawa towards Fukushima	Yamagata Line	Takahata towards Shinjō
Location
- Location within Yamagata Prefecture Location within Japan

Oitama Station (置賜駅, Oitama-eki) is a railway station in the city of Yonezawa, Yamagata Prefecture, Japan, operated by East Japan Railway Company (JR East).

== Lines ==
Oitama Station is served by the Ōu Main Line, and is located 45.6 rail kilometers from the terminus of the line at Fukushima Station.

== Station layout ==
The station has two opposed side platforms connected via a footbridge; however, only one platform is in use. The station is unattended.

=== Platforms ===
1	■ Ōu Main Line	for Yonezawa; Akayu and Yamagata
2	■ Ōu Main Line	not in normal use

== History ==
Oitama Station opened on December 20, 1917. The station was absorbed into the JR East network upon the privatization of JNR on April 1, 1987.

== Surrounding area ==
- Mogami River

== See also ==
- List of railway stations in Japan
