= Iide, Yamagata =

Iide 飯豊町
- Town
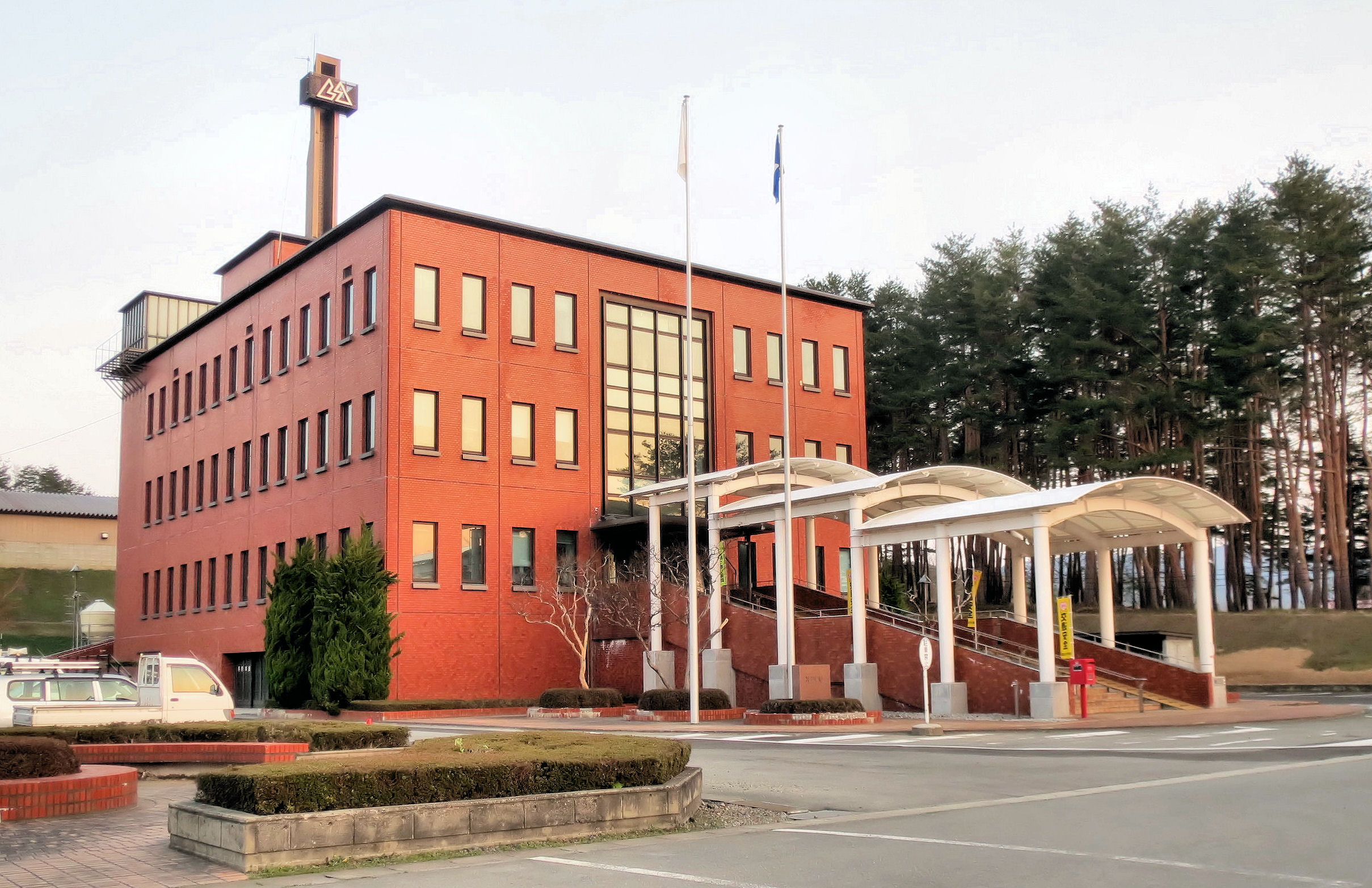
- Iide Town Hall

- Flag Seal

- Location of Iide in Yamagata Prefecture

- Coordinates: 38°02′45″N 139°59′15″E
- Country: Japan
- Region: Tōhoku
- Prefecture: Yamagata
- District: Nishiokitama

Area
  - Total: 329.60 km^{2} (127.26 sq mi)

Population (February 2020)
  - Total: 6,970
  - Density: 21.1/km^{2} (54.8/sq mi)
- Time zone: UTC+9 (Japan Standard Time)
- Phone number: 0238-72-2111
- Address: 2888-banchi Tsubaki, Iide-machi, Nishiokitama-gun, Yamagata-ken 999-0696
- Climate: Cfa/Dfa
- Website: Official website
- Symbols
- Flower: Lilium
- Tree: Maple

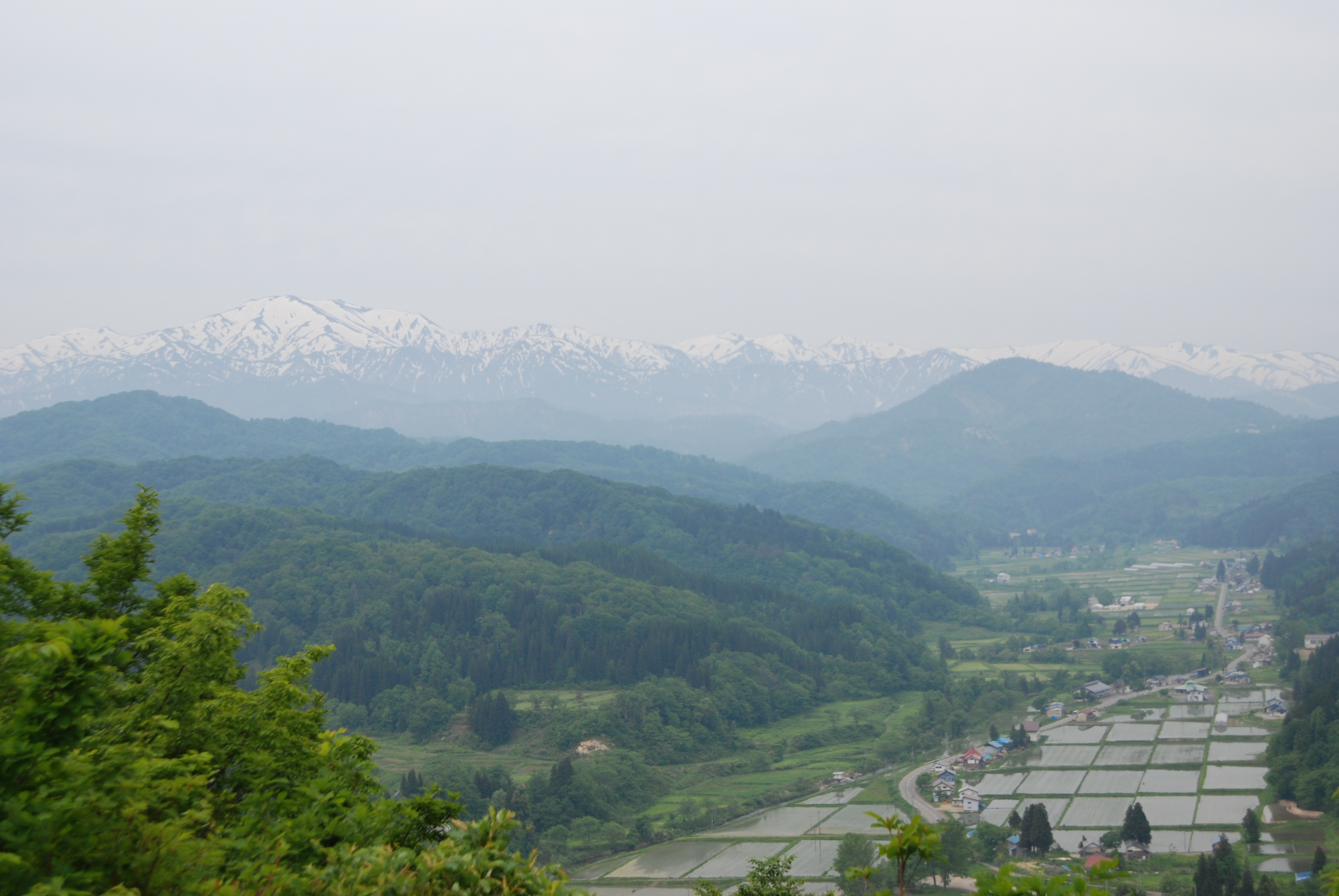
Nakatsugawa neighborhood of Iide and Iide Mountain Range

Iide (飯豊町, Iide-machi) is a town located in Yamagata Prefecture, Japan. As of 29 February 2020, the town had an estimated population of 6,970 in 2354 households, and a population density of 21 persons per km². The total area of the town is 329.60 square kilometres (127 sq mi). In 2008, Iide was selected as one of The Most Beautiful Villages in Japan.

== Geography ==
Iide is located in mountainous southern Yamagata Prefecture, bordered by Fukushima Prefecture to the south. Mount Iide the 2105 meter main peak of the Iide mountain range that spans the Fukushima, Niigata and Yamagata prefectures is on the border of the town, although its peak is actually within Fukushima.

=== Neighboring municipalities ===
- Fukushima Prefecture
  - Kitakata
- Yamagata Prefecture
  - Kawanishi
  - Nagai
  - Oguni
  - Yonezawa

=== Climate ===
Iide has a humid continental climate (Köppen climate classification Dfa) with large seasonal temperature differences, with warm to hot (and often humid) summers and cold (sometimes severely cold) winters. Precipitation is significant throughout the year, but is heaviest from August to October. The average annual temperature in Iide is 10.3 °C (50.5 °F). The average annual rainfall is 2,077.7 mm (81.80 in) with December as the wettest month. The temperatures are highest on average in August, at around 23.2 °C (73.8 °F), and lowest in January, at around −1.2 °C (29.8 °F). In the winter season, snow cover may exceed 2 meters even in the center of town due to the monsoon from the Sea of Japan.

Climate data for Iide, elevation 260 m (850 ft), (1991−2020 normals, extremes 1976−present)
Month	Jan	Feb	Mar	Apr	May	Jun	Jul	Aug	Sep	Oct	Nov	Dec	Year
Record high °C (°F)	13.2 (55.8)	16.8 (62.2)	19.5 (67.1)	28.9 (84.0)	33.1 (91.6)	34.6 (94.3)	35.7 (96.3)	37.9 (100.2)	35.3 (95.5)	28.7 (83.7)	24.6 (76.3)	17.2 (63.0)	37.9 (100.2)
Mean daily maximum °C (°F)	2.0 (35.6)	3.0 (37.4)	6.7 (44.1)	14.0 (57.2)	20.9 (69.6)	24.2 (75.6)	27.3 (81.1)	28.8 (83.8)	24.4 (75.9)	18.2 (64.8)	11.5 (52.7)	4.8 (40.6)	15.5 (59.9)
Daily mean °C (°F)	−1.2 (29.8)	−0.9 (30.4)	1.8 (35.2)	7.5 (45.5)	14.2 (57.6)	18.5 (65.3)	22.3 (72.1)	23.2 (73.8)	18.9 (66.0)	12.4 (54.3)	6.2 (43.2)	1.2 (34.2)	10.3 (50.6)
Mean daily minimum °C (°F)	−4.5 (23.9)	−5.0 (23.0)	−2.7 (27.1)	1.5 (34.7)	7.6 (45.7)	13.3 (55.9)	18.0 (64.4)	18.6 (65.5)	14.4 (57.9)	7.6 (45.7)	1.7 (35.1)	−2.0 (28.4)	5.7 (42.3)
Record low °C (°F)	−16.6 (2.1)	−19.3 (−2.7)	−13.1 (8.4)	−7.5 (18.5)	−1.3 (29.7)	4.3 (39.7)	7.6 (45.7)	8.3 (46.9)	3.3 (37.9)	−1.9 (28.6)	−9.0 (15.8)	−16.4 (2.5)	−19.3 (−2.7)
Average precipitation mm (inches)	256.5 (10.10)	161.6 (6.36)	134.7 (5.30)	97.8 (3.85)	95.1 (3.74)	130.7 (5.15)	223.9 (8.81)	173.7 (6.84)	140.6 (5.54)	158.8 (6.25)	213.8 (8.42)	273.2 (10.76)	2,077.7 (81.80)
Average precipitation days (≥ 1.0 mm)	24.7	20.8	18.7	14.1	11.2	11.5	14.4	12.2	12.8	14.5	18.6	23.2	196.7
Mean monthly sunshine hours	44.3	72.2	138.4	202.4	235.5	199.1	181.7	221.7	167.7	149.4	96.8	51.4	1,749.4
Source: Japan Meteorological Agency

== Demographics ==
Per Japanese census data, the population of Iide peaked in the 1950s, and is now considerably less than what it was a century ago.

Historical population
Year	Pop.	±%
1920	13,823	—
1930	14,942	+8.1%
1940	14,664	−1.9%
1950	16,796	+14.5%
1960	15,478	−7.8%
1970	12,129	−21.6%
1980	10,220	−15.7%
1990	9,880	−3.3%
2000	9,204	−6.8%
2010	7,943	−13.7%
2020	6,613	−16.7%

== History ==
The area of present-day Iide was part of ancient Dewa Province. After the start of the Meiji period, most of the area of Iide became part of Nishiokitama District, Yamagata Prefecture, with the establishment of the modern municipalities system. The village of Iide was established on October 1, 1954 by the merger of the villages of Toyohara, Sogawa and Toyokawa. It was elevated to town status on September 1, 1958 after merging with the village of Nakatsugawa from Minamiokitama District.

== Economy ==
The economy of Iide is based on agriculture. About half of the Yonezawa beef originates from this town. The town is also noted for the brewing of nigori sake.

== Education ==
Iide has four public elementary schools and one public middle school operated by the town government. The town does not have a high school.

== Transportation ==
=== Railway ===
East Japan Railway Company - Yonesaka Line

- Hagyū - Uzen-Tsubaki - Tenoko

=== Highway ===
- National Route 113
