= Yonesaka Line =

Railway line in Japan

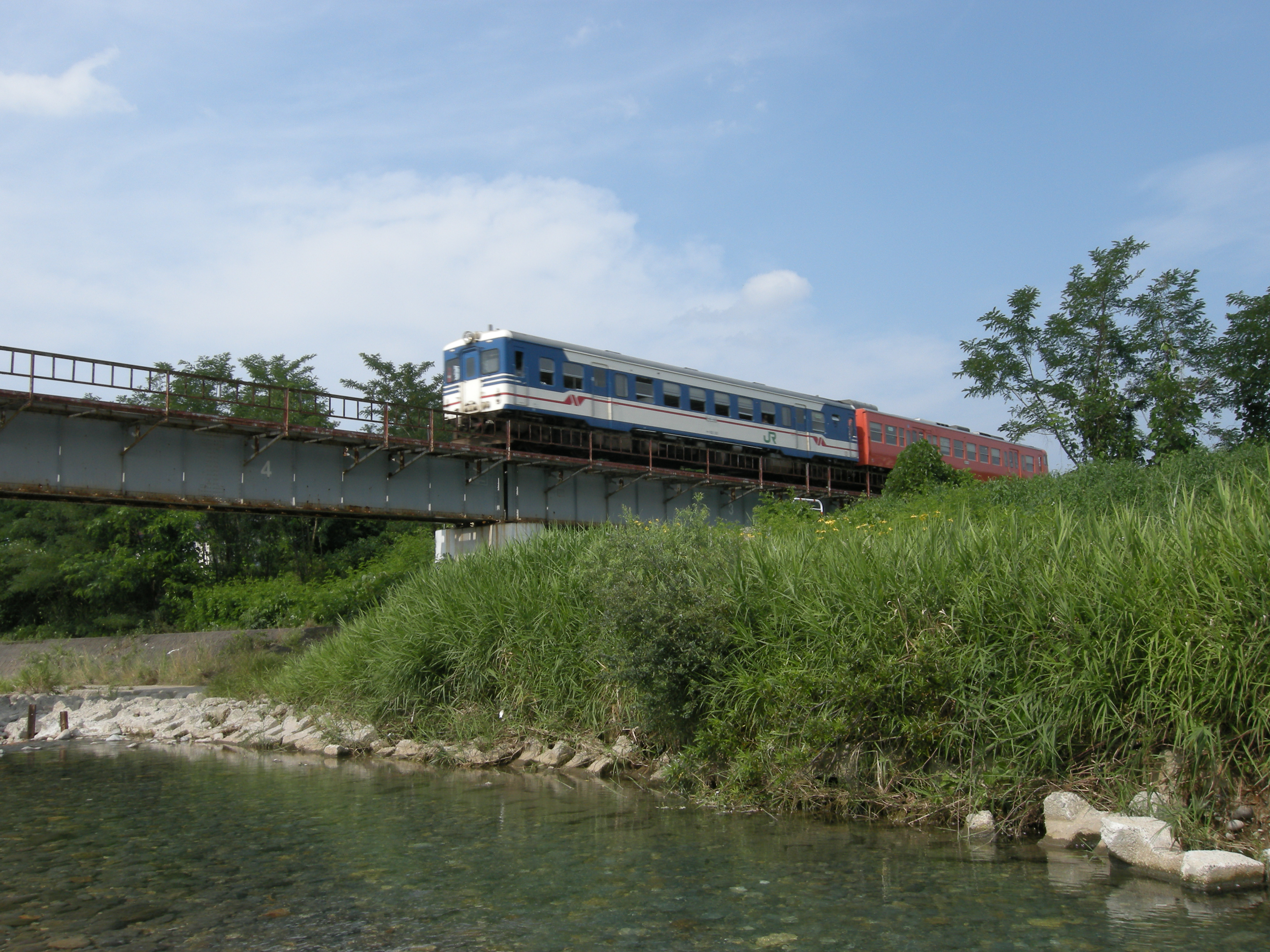
- KiHa 52 and KiHa 47 on the Yonesaka Line in August 2008

Overview
- Native name: 米坂線
- Status: Partially suspended due to rainstorm damage
- Owner: JR East
- Locale: Yamagata Prefecture, Japan
- Termini: Yonezawa; Sakamachi
- Stations: 20

Service
- Type: Regional rail
- Operator: JR East
- Rolling stock: KiHa 110 series DMU, GV-E400 series DEMU

History
- Opened: 1936; 90 years ago

Technical
- Line length: 90.7 km (56.4 mi)
- Number of tracks: Entire line single tracked
- Character: Rural
- Track gauge: 1,067 mm (3 ft 6 in)
- Electrification: None
- Operating speed: 85 km/h (53 mph)
Route map

The Yonesaka Line (米坂線, Yonesaka-sen) is a railway line in Japan, operated by East Japan Railway Company (JR East). It connects Yonezawa Station in Yamagata Prefecture to Sakamachi Station in Niigata Prefecture. At Yonezawa, connections to the Yamagata Shinkansen and Ōu Main Line can be made; while the Uetsu Main Line connects at Sakamachi Station. The line takes its name from the first kanji of Yonezawa (米沢) and Sakamachi (坂町).

Trains can only pass each other at Uzen-Komatsu, Imaizumi, Uzen-Tsubaki, Oguni, Echigo-Kanamaru, and Echigo-Shimoseki stations.

Services between Sakamachi and Imaizumi have been suspended due to flood damage since August 2022.

== Stations ==
Station	Japanese	Distance (km)		Transfers		Location	
Station	Japanese	Between stations	Total	Transfers		Location	
Yonezawa	米沢	-	0.0	Yamagata Shinkansen; ■ Ōu Main Line	∨	Yonezawa	Yamagata; Prefecture
Minami-Yonezawa	南米沢	3.1	3.1		｜	Yonezawa	Yamagata; Prefecture
Nishi-Yonezawa	西米沢	3.4	6.5		｜	Yonezawa	Yamagata; Prefecture
Narushima	成島	3.1	9.6		｜	Yonezawa	Yamagata; Prefecture
Chūgun	中郡	2.9	12.5		｜	Kawanishi	Yamagata; Prefecture
Uzen-Komatsu	羽前小松	4.4	16.9		◇	Kawanishi	Yamagata; Prefecture
Inukawa	犬川	2.5	19.4		｜	Kawanishi	Yamagata; Prefecture
Imaizumi	今泉	3.6	23.0	■ Flower Nagai Line	◇	Nagai	Yamagata; Prefecture
Hagyū	萩生	4.3	27.3		｜	Iide	Yamagata; Prefecture
Uzen-Tsubaki	羽前椿	2.8	30.1		◇	Iide	Yamagata; Prefecture
Tenoko	手ノ子	4.6	34.7		｜	Iide	Yamagata; Prefecture
Uzen-Numazawa	羽前沼沢	9.2	43.9		｜	Oguni	Yamagata; Prefecture
Isaryō	伊佐領	6.1	50.0		｜	Oguni	Yamagata; Prefecture
Uzen-Matsuoka	羽前松岡	4.7	54.7		｜	Oguni	Yamagata; Prefecture
Oguni	小国	3.6	58.3		◇	Oguni	Yamagata; Prefecture
Echigo-Kanamaru	越後金丸	9.5	67.8		◇	Sekikawa	Niigata; Prefecture
Echigo-Katakai	越後片貝	5.3	73.1		｜	Sekikawa	Niigata; Prefecture
Echigo-Shimoseki	越後下関	6.6	79.7		◇	Sekikawa	Niigata; Prefecture
Echigo-Ōshima	越後大島	3.8	83.5		｜	Sekikawa	Niigata; Prefecture
Sakamachi	坂町	7.2	90.7	■ Uetsu Main Line	^	Murakami	Niigata; Prefecture

Symbols:

- | - Single-track
- ◇ - Single-track; station where trains can pass
- ^ - Double-track section starts from this point
- ∨ - Single-track section starts from this point

== Rolling stock ==
As of April 2020, the following rolling stock is used on the Yonesaka Line. All are based at Niitsu Depot.

- KiHa 110 series DMUs
- GV-E400 series DEMUs (since March 2020)
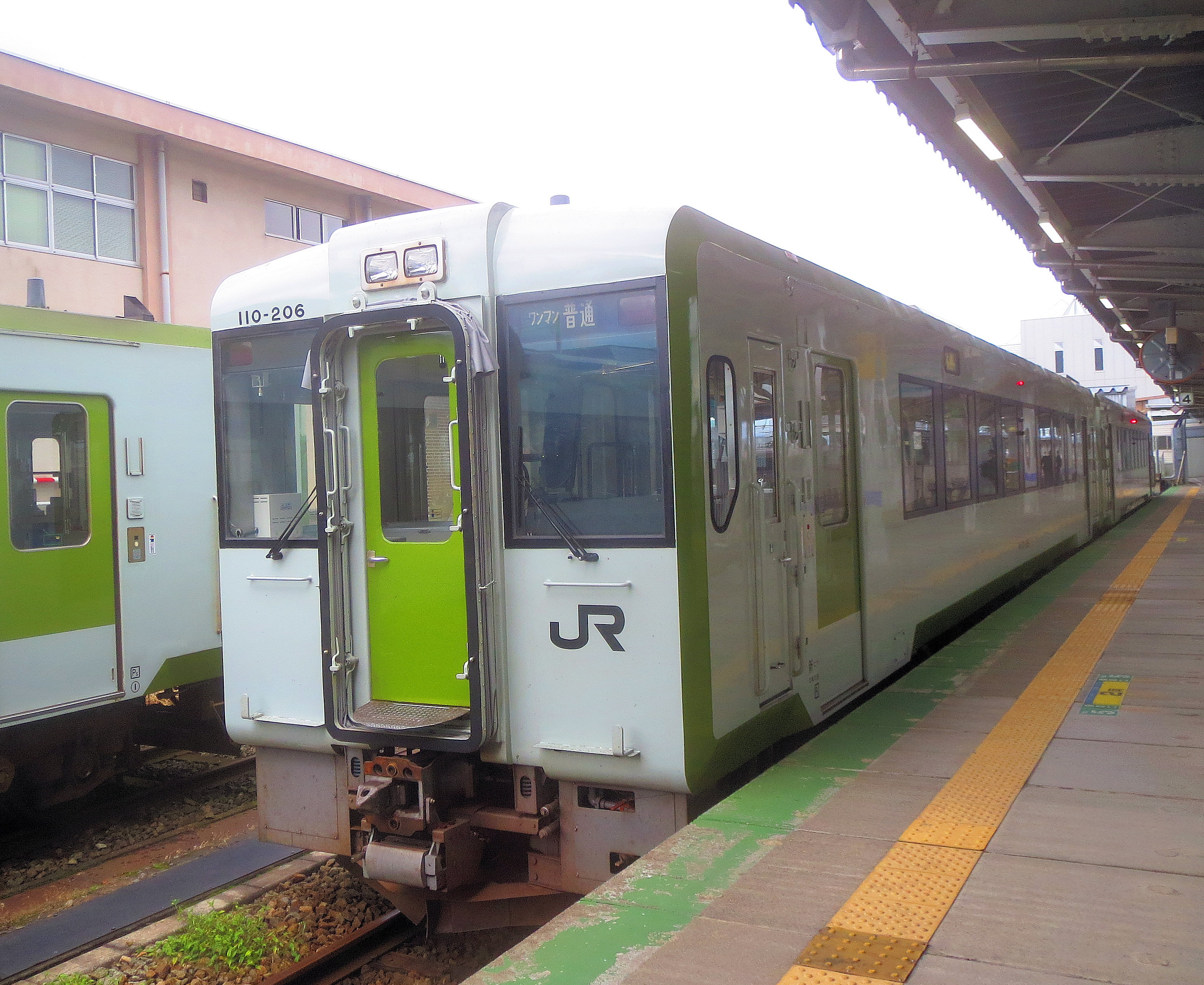
KiHa 110 DMU at Yonezawa Station in October 2016

=== Past ===
The following rolling stock was used on the Yonesaka Line. All were based at Niitsu Depot.

- KiHa 40/47/48 DMUs (until 2009)
- KiHa 52 DMUs (until 2009)
- KiHa 58 DMUs (until 2009)
- KiHa E120 DMUs (since November 2008, until March 2020)
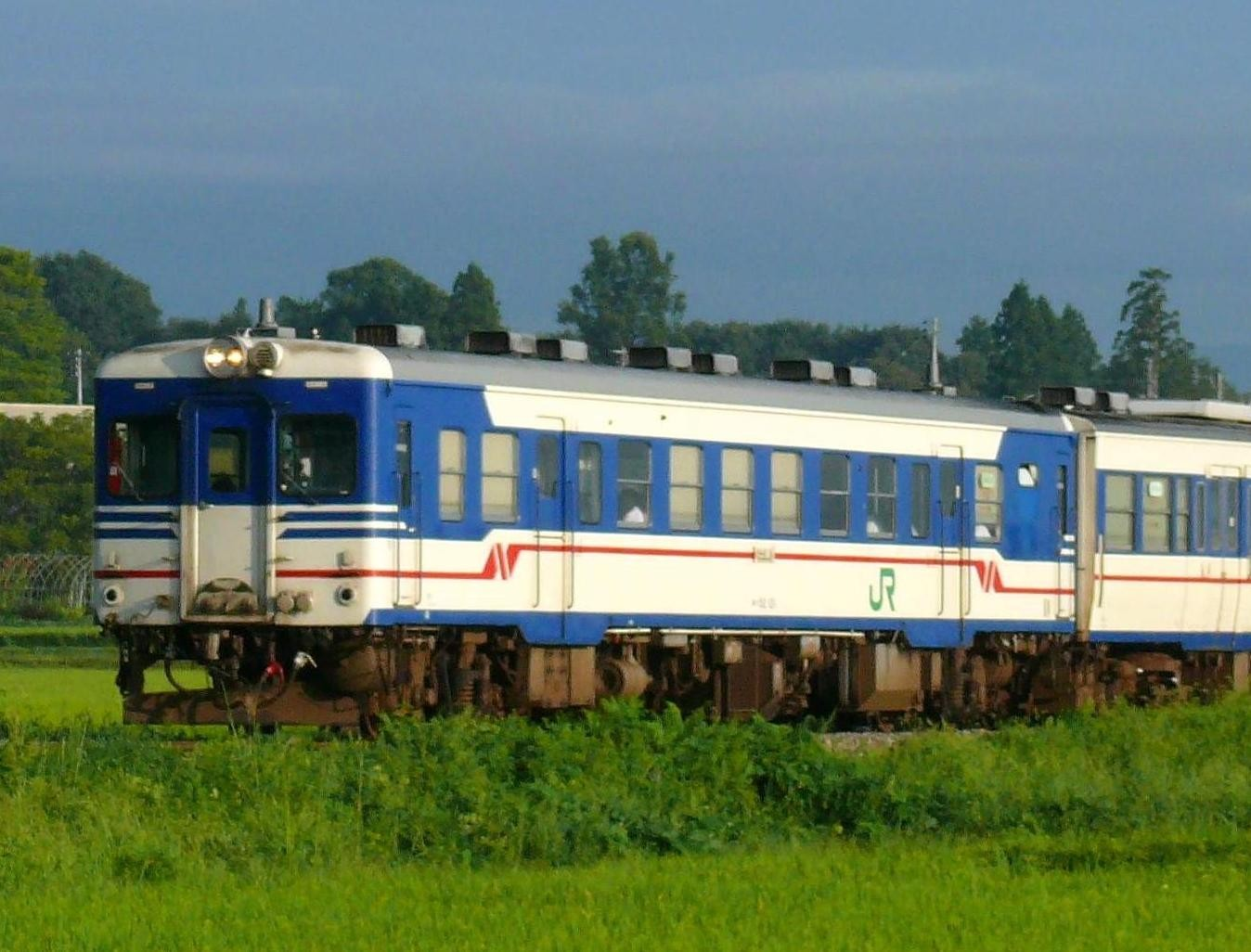
KiHa 52 and 47 on Yonesaka Line in September 2008

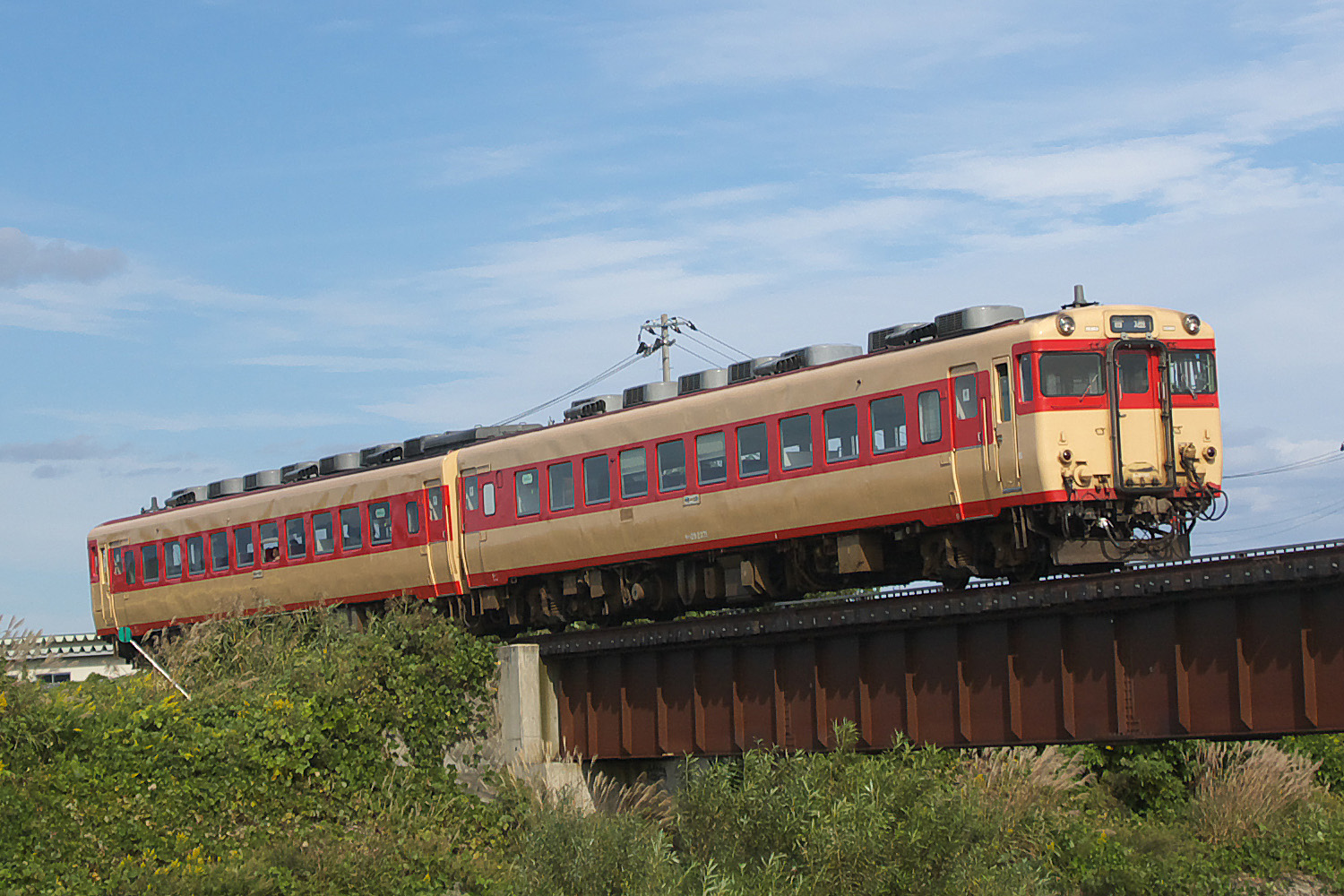
KiHa 58 on Yonesaka Line in October 2008

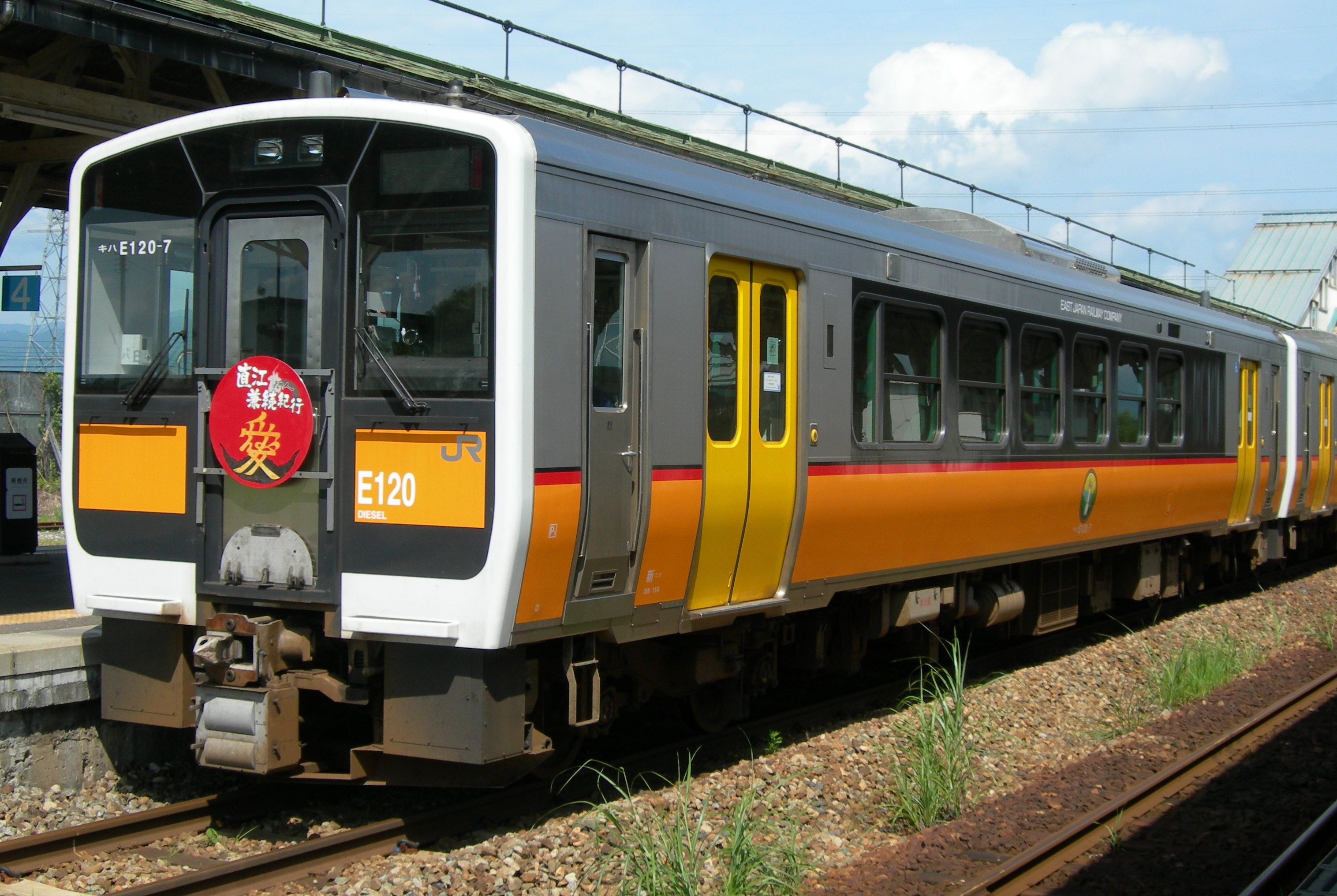
A JR East KiHa E120 DMU at Imaizumi Station in July 2009

== History ==
The Yonezawa to Oguni section was opened in stages between 1926 and 1935. The Sakamachi to Echigo-Kanamaru section was opened between 1931 and 1933. The line was completed with the opening of the Oguni to Echigo-Kanamaru section in 1936.
