= Sekine Station =

Railway station in Yonezawa, Yamagata Prefecture, Japan

Sekine Station 関根駅
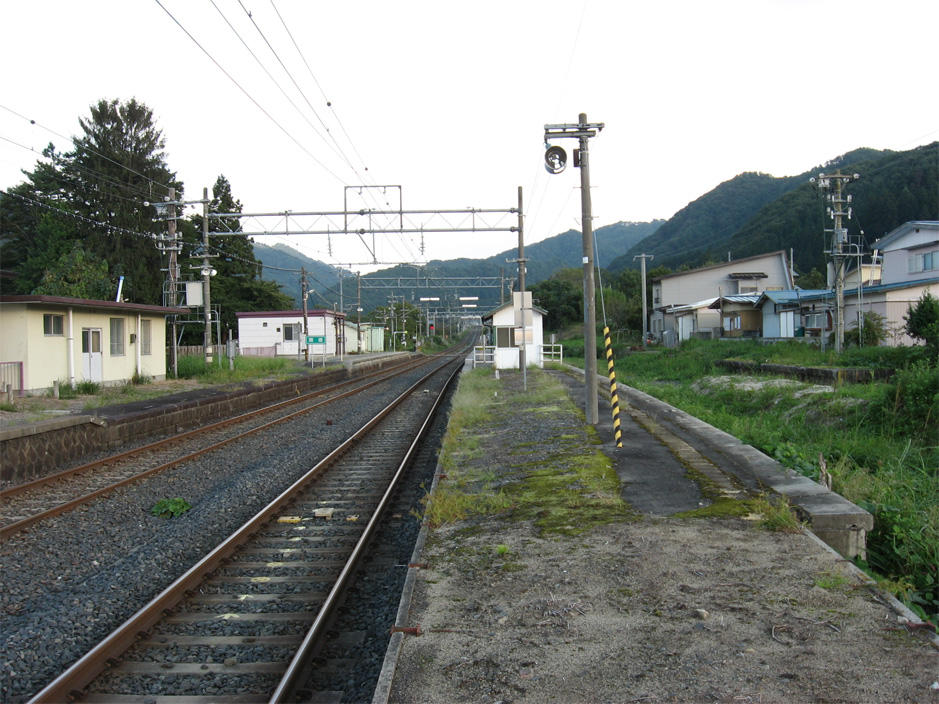
- Sekine Station, October 2007

General information
- Location: Sekine, Yonezawa-shi, Yamagata-ken 992-1205; Japan
- Coordinates: 37°51′53″N 140°08′47″E
- Line: ■ Ōu Main Line
- Distance: 34.8 km from Fukushima
- Platforms: 2 side platforms

Other information
- Status: Unstaffed
- Website: Official website

History
- Opened: 15 May 1899

Services
Preceding station	JR East	Following station
Ōsawa towards Fukushima	Yamagata Line	Yonezawa towards Shinjō
Location
- Location within Yamagata Prefecture Location within Japan

Sekine Station (関根駅, Sekine-eki) is a railway station in the city of Yonezawa, Yamagata Prefecture, Japan, operated by East Japan Railway Company (JR East).

== Lines ==
Sekine Station is served by the Ōu Main Line, and is located 34.8 rail kilometers from the terminus of the line at Fukushima Station.

== Station layout ==
The station has two opposed side platforms connected via a level crossing. The station is unattended.

=== Platforms ===
Station side	■ Ōu Main Line	for Fukushima
Opposite side	■ Ōu Main Line	for Yonezawa

== History ==
Sekine Station opened on 15 May 1899. The station was absorbed into the JR East network upon the privatization of JNR on 1 April 1987.

== Surrounding area ==
- Fumon-in
- Yunosawa Onsen

== See also ==
- List of railway stations in Japan
