= Yonezawa, Yamagata =

Yonezawa 米沢市
- City
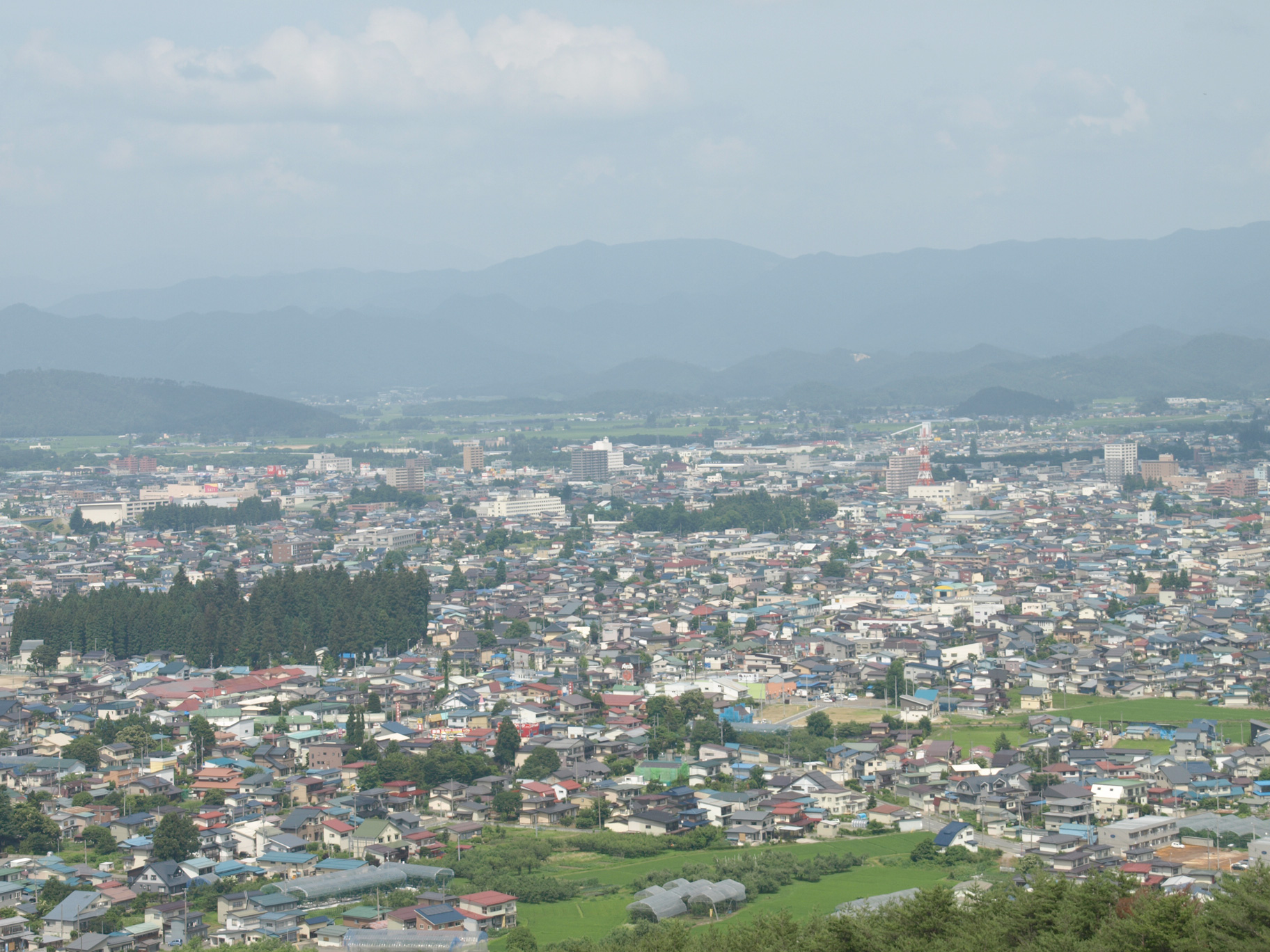
- Overview of downtown Yonezawa

- Flag Seal

- Location of Yonezawa in Yamagata Prefecture

- Coordinates: 37°55′20.1″N 140°07′0.4″E
- Country: Japan
- Region: Tōhoku
- Prefecture: Yamagata
- First official recorded: 712 AD
- City settled: April 1, 1889

Government
  - Mayor: Yōsuke Kondō (since December 2023)

Area
  - Total: 548.51 km^{2} (211.78 sq mi)

Population (February 2020)
  - Total: 81,707
  - Density: 148.96/km^{2} (385.81/sq mi)
- Time zone: UTC+9 (Japan Standard Time)
- Phone number: 0238-22-5111
- Address: 5-2-25 Kanaike, Yonezawa-shi, Yamagata-ken 992-8501
- Climate: Cfa/Dfa
- Website: Official website
- Symbols
- Flower: Azumashakunage (Rhododendron metternichii Sieb. et Zucc. var. pentamerum Maxim)
- Tree: Kometsuga (Tsuga diversifolia)

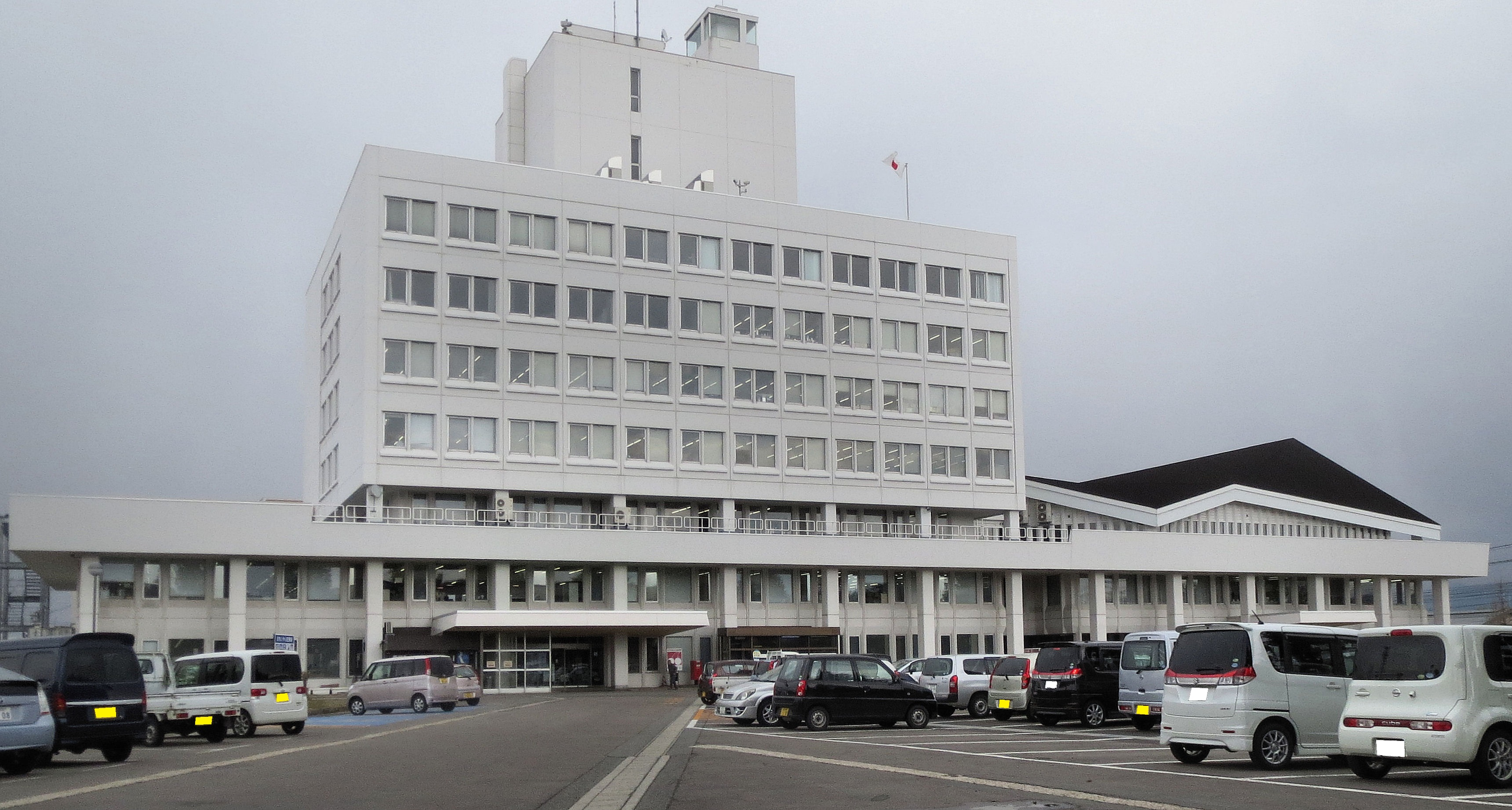
Yonezawa City Hall

Yonezawa (米沢市, Yonezawa-shi) is a city in Yamagata Prefecture, Japan. As of 1 February 2020, the city had an estimated population of 81,707 in 33,278 households, and a population density of 150 persons per km^{2}. The total area of the city is 548.51 square kilometres (212 sq mi). Yonezawa is most famous for its local delicacies (apples, Yonezawa beef, and carp) and for being a castle town that was once home to the Uesugi clan, including the daimyō Uesugi Yozan.

== Geography ==
Yonezawa is located in the southeast corner of Yamagata Prefecture. The southern and eastern portions of the city are river basins surrounded by large mountains, forming the Yonezawa Basin. The southern portion of the city has a complex terrain with several rivers and alternating ridges and valleys orientated east to west. The Mogami River flows through the city. Part of the city is within the borders of the Bandai-Asahi National Park.

=== Neighboring municipalities ===
- Fukushima Prefecture
  - Inawashiro
  - Fukushima
  - Kitakata
  - Kitashiobara
- Yamagata Prefecture
  - Iide
  - Kawanishi
  - Takahata

== Climate ==
Yonezawa has a humid continental climate (Köppen climate classification Dfa) with large seasonal temperature differences, with warm to hot (and often humid) summers and cold (sometimes severely cold) winters. Precipitation is significant throughout the year, but is heaviest from August to October. The average annual temperature in Yonezawa is 11.4 °C (52.5 °F). The average annual rainfall is 1,444.6 mm (56.87 in) with July as the wettest month. The temperatures are highest on average in August, at around 24.5 °C (76.1 °F), and lowest in January, at around −0.8 °C (30.6 °F).

Climate data for Yonezawa (elevation 245 m, 1991–2020 normals, extremes 1976–present)
| Month | Jan | Feb | Mar | Apr | May | Jun | Jul | Aug | Sep | Oct | Nov | Dec | Year |
|---|---|---|---|---|---|---|---|---|---|---|---|---|---|
| Record high °C (°F) | 13.6 (56.5) | 17.5 (63.5) | 22.8 (73.0) | 29.9 (85.8) | 34.7 (94.5) | 35.4 (95.7) | 38.5 (101.3) | 37.7 (99.9) | 36.8 (98.2) | 29.6 (85.3) | 24.6 (76.3) | 18.3 (64.9) | 38.5 (101.3) |
| Mean daily maximum °C (°F) | 2.6 (36.7) | 3.5 (38.3) | 7.6 (45.7) | 15.5 (59.9) | 22.0 (71.6) | 25.3 (77.5) | 28.4 (83.1) | 29.9 (85.8) | 25.4 (77.7) | 19.1 (66.4) | 12.2 (54.0) | 5.5 (41.9) | 16.4 (61.5) |
| Daily mean °C (°F) | −0.8 (30.6) | −0.5 (31.1) | 2.7 (36.9) | 9.3 (48.7) | 15.6 (60.1) | 19.8 (67.6) | 23.4 (74.1) | 24.5 (76.1) | 20.1 (68.2) | 13.5 (56.3) | 7.1 (44.8) | 1.7 (35.1) | 11.4 (52.5) |
| Mean daily minimum °C (°F) | −4.4 (24.1) | −4.6 (23.7) | −1.7 (28.9) | 3.5 (38.3) | 9.7 (49.5) | 15.0 (59.0) | 19.4 (66.9) | 20.2 (68.4) | 15.9 (60.6) | 9.0 (48.2) | 2.7 (36.9) | −1.7 (28.9) | 6.9 (44.4) |
| Record low °C (°F) | −17.3 (0.9) | −18.2 (−0.8) | −12.6 (9.3) | −5.3 (22.5) | 0.6 (33.1) | 6.9 (44.4) | 7.0 (44.6) | 11.4 (52.5) | 5.3 (41.5) | −1.0 (30.2) | −7.9 (17.8) | −14.4 (6.1) | −18.2 (−0.8) |
| Average precipitation mm (inches) | 159.5 (6.28) | 101.8 (4.01) | 85.5 (3.37) | 67.4 (2.65) | 71.1 (2.80) | 114.0 (4.49) | 177.9 (7.00) | 151.4 (5.96) | 128.2 (5.05) | 117.7 (4.63) | 105.0 (4.13) | 158.2 (6.23) | 1,444.6 (56.87) |
| Average snowfall cm (inches) | 267 (105) | 196 (77) | 103 (41) | 8 (3.1) | 0 (0) | 0 (0) | 0 (0) | 0 (0) | 0 (0) | 0 (0) | 7 (2.8) | 146 (57) | 711 (280) |
| Average precipitation days (≥ 1.0 mm) | 21.6 | 17.3 | 15.2 | 11.1 | 9.6 | 10.5 | 14.3 | 11.3 | 11.2 | 11.0 | 14.8 | 19.6 | 168.0 |
| Mean monthly sunshine hours | 61.5 | 87.1 | 144.5 | 179.9 | 202.2 | 165.3 | 145.7 | 182.6 | 139.6 | 129.8 | 96.9 | 64.9 | 1,595.8 |
Source: Japan Meteorological Agency (1991–2020 normals, extremes 1976–present)

== Demographics ==
Per Japanese census data, the population of Yonezawa has recently declined after a long period of stability.

Historical population
| Year | Pop. | ±% |
|---|---|---|
| 1920 | 75,039 | — |
| 1930 | 77,716 | +3.6% |
| 1940 | 82,770 | +6.5% |
| 1950 | 94,649 | +14.4% |
| 1960 | 96,991 | +2.5% |
| 1970 | 92,764 | −4.4% |
| 1980 | 92,823 | +0.1% |
| 1990 | 94,760 | +2.1% |
| 2000 | 95,396 | +0.7% |
| 2010 | 89,401 | −6.3% |
| 2020 | 81,252 | −9.1% |

== History ==
The area of present-day Yonezawa was part of ancient Dewa Province and was controlled in the Sengoku period by the Date clan. The famed warlord Date Masamune was born in Yonezawa. During the Edo period, the area became Yonezawa Domain under the Tokugawa shogunate, ruled by the Uesugi clan. After the start of the Meiji period, the area was organized into Minamiokitama District, Yamagata Prefecture.

The city of Yamagata was established on April 1, 1889, with the establishment of the modern municipalities system

== Government ==
Yonezawa has a mayor-council form of government with a directly elected mayor and a unicameral city legislature of 24 members. The city contributes three members to the Yamagata Prefectural Assembly. In terms of national politics, the city is part of Yamagata District 3 of the lower house of the Diet of Japan.

=== List of mayors of Yonezawa ===
| Name (Japanese kanji name) | Term of Office | |
|---|---|---|
| Ryuzo Otaki {大滝龍蔵} | 5 July 1889 | 30 July 1899 |
| Shinjyuro Otaki {大滝新十郎} | 9 September 1899 | 18 June 1902 |
| Komataro Hirata {平田駒太郎} | 22 July 1902 | 3 February 1905 |
| Chusei Nimura {二村忠誠} | 3 February 1905 | 20 January 1912 |
| Kansuke Sakai {酒井寛助} | 22 July 1902 | 3 February 1905 |
| Chuzo Fukazawa {深沢忠蔵} | 16 April 1914; 5 March 1925 | 15 April 1918; 4 March 1929 |
| Shutaro Usami {宇佐美駿太郎} | 13 May 1918 | 25 June 1920 |
| Hidezo Nagai {永井秀蔵} | 24 November 1920 | 21 November 1924 |
| Matazo Tosaka {登坂又蔵} | 16 March 1929 | 4 March 1944 |
| Tatsugoro Usami{宇佐美辰五郎} | 2 May 1944 | 16 November 1946 |

| Name (Japanese Kanji name) | Term of Office | |
|---|---|---|
| Takeo Okamura {岡村武雄} | 22 July 1902 | 3 February 1905 |
| Kokichi Takahashi {高橋広吉} | 5 August 1948 | 3 December 1955 |
| Keitaro Yoshiike {吉池慶太郎} | 27 January 1956 | 20 December 1975 |
| Toshihide Cho {長俊英} | 22 December 1975 | 21 December 1983 |
| Sachio Takahashi {高橋幸翁} | 22 December 1983 | 21 December 2003 |
| Sanjyuro Abe {安部三十郎} | 22 December 2003 | 21 December 2015 |
| Masaru Nakagawa {中川勝} | 22 December 2015 | 21 December 2023 |
| Yōsuke Kondō (近藤洋介) | 22 December 2023 | present |

== Economy ==
The economy of Yamagata is based on agriculture, horticulture, light manufacturing and tourism.

== Education ==
=== Colleges and universities ===
- Yamagata University Yonezawa campus
- Yonezawa Women's Junior College

=== Primary and secondary education ===
Yonezawa has 18 public elementary schools and eight public middle schools operated by the city government and four public high schools operated by the Yamagata Prefectural Board of Education. There are also two private high schools.

== Transportation ==
=== Railway ===
East Japan Railway Company - Yamagata Shinkansen

- Yonezawa

East Japan Railway Company - Ōu Main Line

- Itaya - Tōge - Ōsawa - Sekine - Yonezawa - Oitama

East Japan Railway Company - Yonesaka Line

- Yonezawa - Minami-Yonezawa - Nishi-Yonezawa - Narushima

=== Highways ===
- Tōhoku-Chūō Expressway – Yonezawa IC
- National Route 13
- National Route 121
- National Route 287
- National Route 399

== Local attractions ==
- Namegawa Great Falls
- Shirabu Onsen (in gorges of Otaru River south of Yonezawa)
- Tateyama Castle
- Yonezawa Castle
- Yonezawa City Uesugi Museum
- Yonezawa Onsen

== International relations ==
=== Sister cities ===
- Moses Lake, Washington, United States

=== Japan ===
- (Japan) Takanabe, Miyazaki, since 1981
- (Japan) Jōetsu, Niigata, since 1981
- (Japan) Okinawa, Okinawa, since 1994
- (Japan) Tōkai, Aichi, since 1999

=== Worldwide ===
- Taubaté, Brazil, since January 28, 1974
- (United States) Moses Lake, Washington, USA, since May 1, 1981

== Notable people from Yonezawa ==
- Junzaburo Ban, actor
- Itō Chūta, architect
- Takehiko Endo, politician
- Yamashita Gentarō, admiral, Imperial Japanese Navy
- Masami Kobayashi, admiral, Imperial Japanese Navy
- Hiroshi Masumura, manga artist
- Mutsuo Minagawa, Nippon Professional Baseball player
- Chūichi Nagumo, admiral, Imperial Japanese Navy
- Ikeda Shigeaki, politician
- Hirata Tosuke, Meiji period statesman
