= Hirakida Station =

Railway station in Tainai, Niigata Prefecture, Japan

Hirakida Station 平木田駅
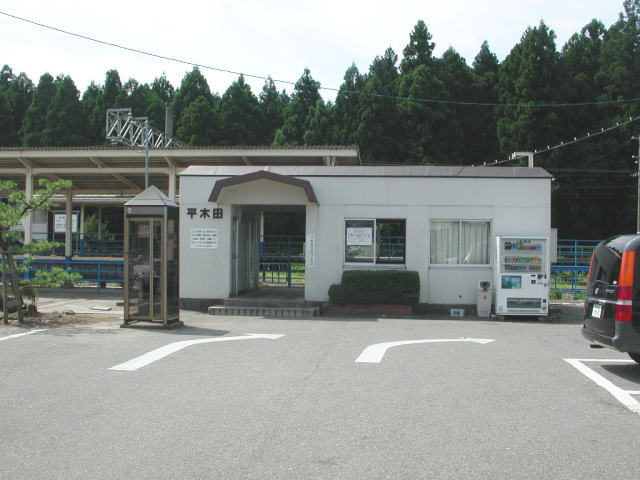
- Hirakida Station in August 2004

General information
- Location: 1605 Hirakida, Tainai-shi, Niigata-ken 959-2614; Japan
- Coordinates: 38°05′41.1″N 139°25′42″E
- Operator: JR East
- Line: ■ Uetsu Main Line
- Distance: 44.7 kilometers from Niitsu
- Platforms: 2 side platforms
- Tracks: 2
- Connections

Other information
- Status: Unstaffed
- Website: Official website

History
- Opened: 1 November 1914

Services
Preceding station	JR East	Following station
Nakajō towards Niitsu	Uetsu Main Line	Sakamachi towards Akita
Location
- Location within Japan

Hirakida Station (平木田駅, Hirakida-eki) is a railway station located in the city of Tainai, Niigata Prefecture, Japan. It is served by the Uetsu Main Line. The station is 44.7 kilometers from the terminus of the line at Niitsu.

== Station layout ==
The station consists of two opposed side platforms connected by a footbridge. The station is unattended.

=== Platforms ===
1	■ Uetsu Main Line	Shibata, Niitsu, Niigata
3	■ Uetsu Main Line	Sakamachi, Murakami

== History ==
The station opened on 1 November 1914. With the privatization of Japanese National Railways (JNR) on 1 April 1987, the station came under the control of JR East.

== Surrounding area ==
The station is mainly used by students who live in the area. Points of interest include:

- Hirakida Ekimae Post Office
- Idaten Shrine
- Idaten-yama Ruins
- Oppō-ji

== See also ==
- List of railway stations in Japan
