= Oguni, Yamagata =

Oguni 小国町
- Town
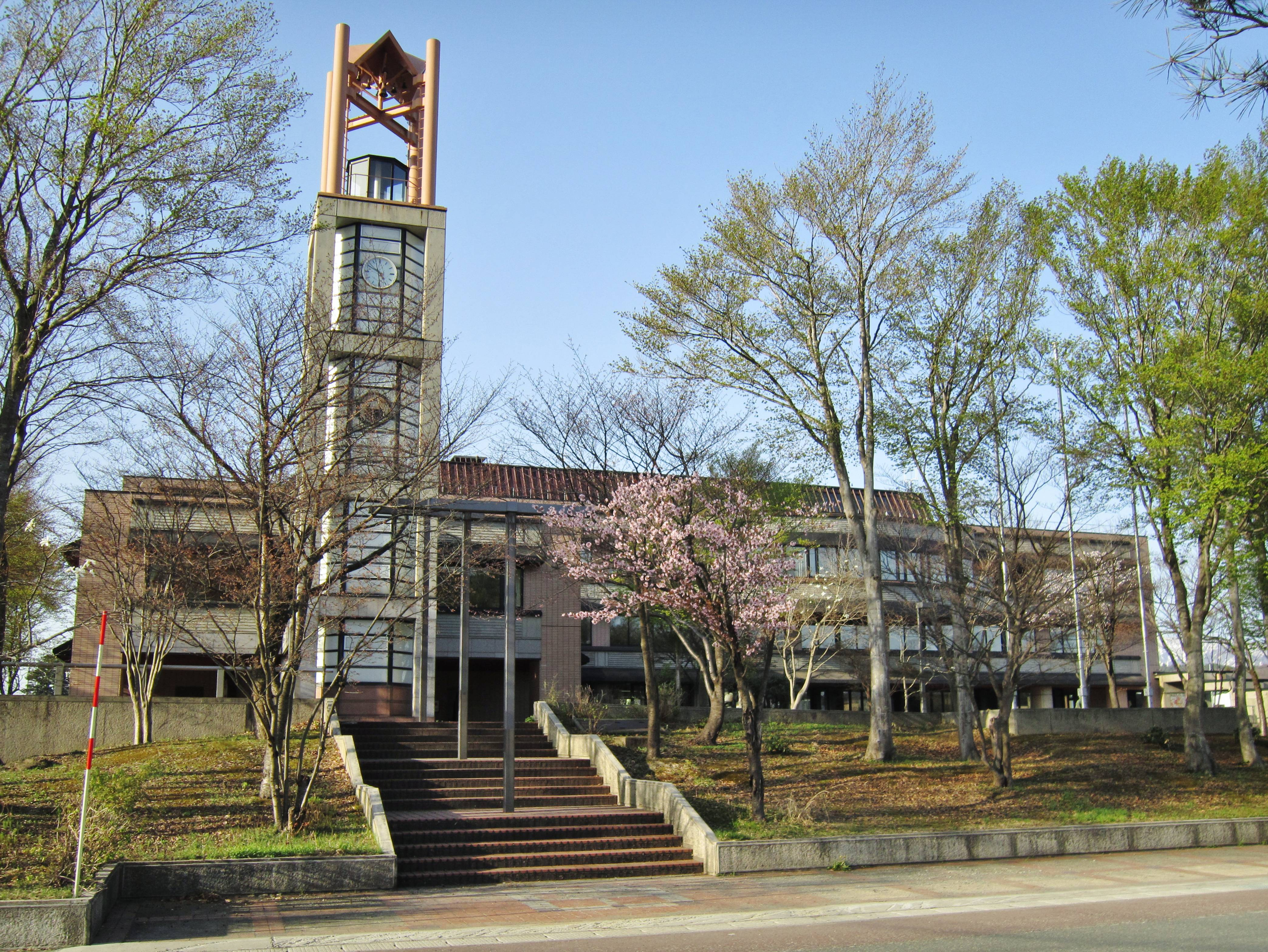
- Oguni Town Hall

- Flag Seal

- Location of Oguni in Yamagata Prefecture

- Coordinates: 38°03′41.3″N 139°44′36.1″E
- Country: Japan
- Region: Tōhoku
- Prefecture: Yamagata
- District: Nishiokitama

Area
  - Total: 737.56 km^{2} (284.77 sq mi)

Population (February 2020)
  - Total: 7,376
  - Density: 10.00/km^{2} (25.90/sq mi)
- Time zone: UTC+9 (Japan Standard Time)
- Phone number: 0238-62-2111
- Address: 2-70 Ogunikosaka, Oguni-chō, Yamagata-ken 999-1363
- Climate: Cfa/Dfa
- Website: Official website
- Symbols
- Bird: Japanese bush-warbler
- Flower: Sakura
- Tree: Japanese beech

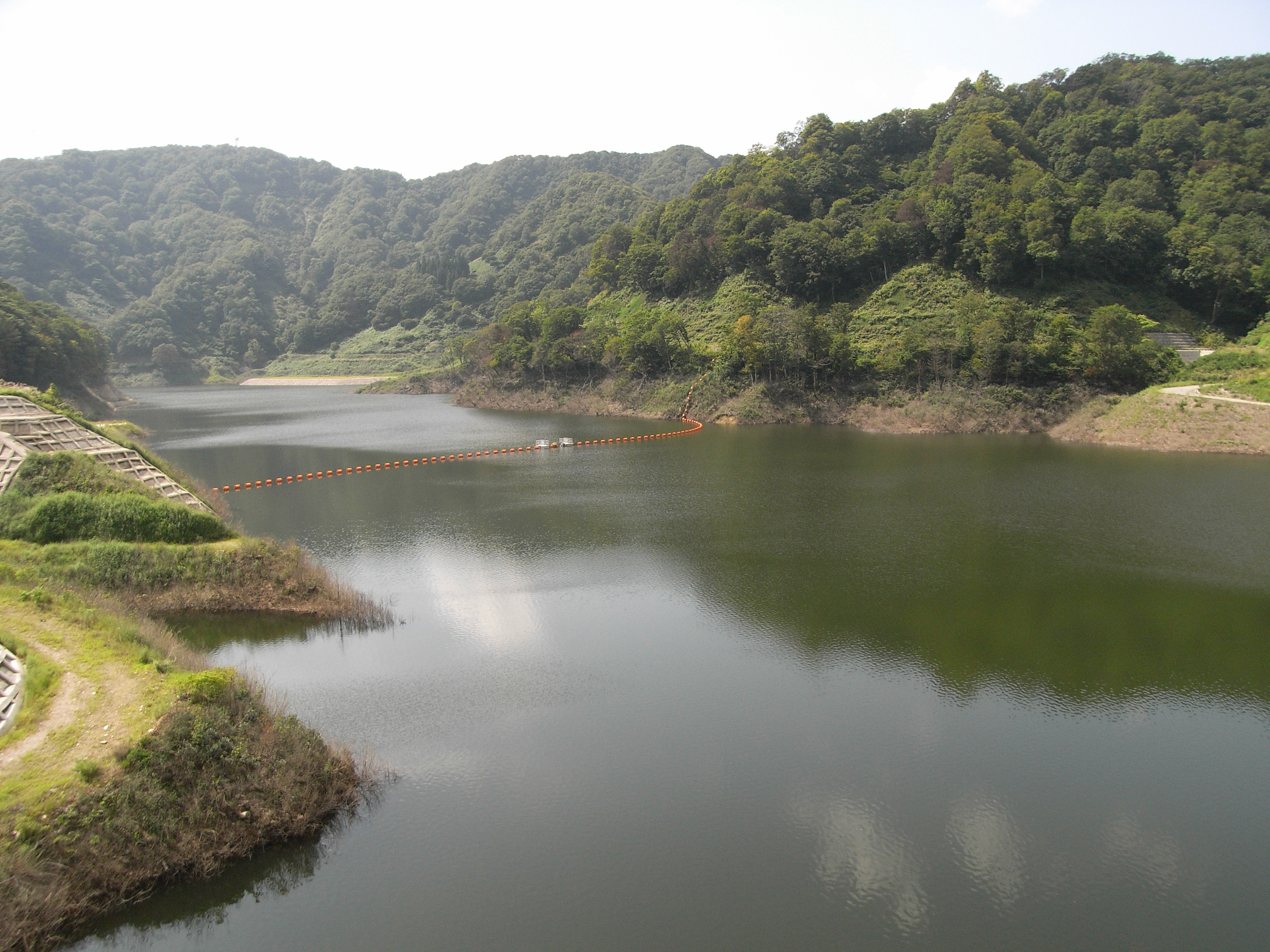
Lake Shiroimori-oguni

Oguni (小国町, Oguni-machi) is a town located in Yamagata Prefecture, Japan. As of 29 February 2020, the town had an estimated population of 7,376 in 3020 households, and a population density of 10 persons per km^{2}. The total area of the town is 737.56 square kilometres (285 sq mi).

== Geography ==
Oguni is located in mountainous southwestern Yamagata Prefecture, bordered by Niigata Prefecture to the west and south.

=== Neighboring municipalities ===
- Niigata Prefecture
  - Murakami
  - Sekikawa
  - Shibata
  - Tainai
- Yamagata Prefecture
  - Asahi
  - Iide
  - Nagai
  - Nishikawa

=== Climate ===
Oguni has a humid continental climate (Köppen climate classification Cfa) with large seasonal temperature differences, with warm to hot (and often humid) summers and cold (sometimes severely cold) winters. Precipitation is significant throughout the year, but is heaviest from August to October. The average annual temperature in Oguni is 10.9 °C (51.6 °F). The average annual rainfall is 3,051.6 mm (120.14 in) with December as the wettest month. The temperatures are highest on average in August, at around 23.8 °C (74.8 °F), and lowest in January, at around −0.3 °C (31.5 °F). In the winter season, snow cover may exceed 2 meters even in the center of town due to the monsoon from the Sea of Japan.

Climate data for Oguni, elevation 140 m (460 ft), (1991−2020 normals, extremes 1976−present)
| Month | Jan | Feb | Mar | Apr | May | Jun | Jul | Aug | Sep | Oct | Nov | Dec | Year |
|---|---|---|---|---|---|---|---|---|---|---|---|---|---|
| Record high °C (°F) | 13.3 (55.9) | 17.3 (63.1) | 19.9 (67.8) | 30.1 (86.2) | 34.2 (93.6) | 33.6 (92.5) | 36.2 (97.2) | 38.0 (100.4) | 35.6 (96.1) | 30.7 (87.3) | 25.2 (77.4) | 18.1 (64.6) | 38.0 (100.4) |
| Mean daily maximum °C (°F) | 2.9 (37.2) | 3.8 (38.8) | 7.3 (45.1) | 14.5 (58.1) | 21.2 (70.2) | 24.7 (76.5) | 27.7 (81.9) | 29.5 (85.1) | 25.1 (77.2) | 18.9 (66.0) | 12.2 (54.0) | 5.6 (42.1) | 16.1 (61.0) |
| Daily mean °C (°F) | −0.3 (31.5) | −0.1 (31.8) | 2.2 (36.0) | 7.7 (45.9) | 14.4 (57.9) | 18.9 (66.0) | 22.7 (72.9) | 23.8 (74.8) | 19.5 (67.1) | 13.1 (55.6) | 6.9 (44.4) | 1.9 (35.4) | 10.9 (51.6) |
| Mean daily minimum °C (°F) | −3.0 (26.6) | −3.5 (25.7) | −2.1 (28.2) | 1.6 (34.9) | 8.2 (46.8) | 14.0 (57.2) | 18.8 (65.8) | 19.5 (67.1) | 15.5 (59.9) | 9.0 (48.2) | 2.9 (37.2) | −0.8 (30.6) | 6.7 (44.0) |
| Record low °C (°F) | −16.0 (3.2) | −17.9 (−0.2) | −15.0 (5.0) | −8.5 (16.7) | −1.1 (30.0) | 5.1 (41.2) | 8.4 (47.1) | 11.2 (52.2) | 6.4 (43.5) | 0.4 (32.7) | −5.4 (22.3) | −11.1 (12.0) | −17.9 (−0.2) |
| Average precipitation mm (inches) | 342.1 (13.47) | 243.2 (9.57) | 202.4 (7.97) | 163.0 (6.42) | 149.4 (5.88) | 191.7 (7.55) | 334.2 (13.16) | 234.7 (9.24) | 190.1 (7.48) | 234.9 (9.25) | 353.8 (13.93) | 416.7 (16.41) | 3,051.6 (120.14) |
| Average snowfall cm (inches) | 336 (132) | 257 (101) | 159 (63) | 23 (9.1) | 0 (0) | 0 (0) | 0 (0) | 0 (0) | 0 (0) | 0 (0) | 10 (3.9) | 176 (69) | 958 (377) |
| Average extreme snow depth cm (inches) | 139 (55) | 171 (67) | 136 (54) | 44 (17) | 0 (0) | 0 (0) | 0 (0) | 0 (0) | 0 (0) | 0 (0) | 5 (2.0) | 68 (27) | 172 (68) |
| Average precipitation days (≥ 1.0 mm) | 25.6 | 22.5 | 20.8 | 15.0 | 12.9 | 12.3 | 16.0 | 13.2 | 14.2 | 16.1 | 20.4 | 24.3 | 213.3 |
| Average snowy days (≥ 3 cm) | 24.0 | 21.2 | 18.5 | 3.6 | 0 | 0 | 0 | 0 | 0 | 0 | 1.2 | 13.3 | 81.8 |
| Mean monthly sunshine hours | 25.5 | 42.4 | 92.3 | 147.8 | 189.7 | 163.4 | 144.9 | 179.6 | 131.8 | 108.6 | 65.4 | 31.3 | 1,322.6 |
Source: Japan Meteorological Agency

== Demographics ==
Per Japanese census data, the population of Oguni peaked in the 1950s, and is now considerably less than what it was a century ago.

Historical population
| Year | Pop. | ±% |
|---|---|---|
| 1920 | 10,158 | — |
| 1930 | 11,288 | +11.1% |
| 1940 | 15,492 | +37.2% |
| 1950 | 17,899 | +15.5% |
| 1960 | 17,787 | −0.6% |
| 1970 | 13,999 | −21.3% |
| 1980 | 12,221 | −12.7% |
| 1990 | 11,315 | −7.4% |
| 2000 | 10,262 | −9.3% |
| 2010 | 8,862 | −13.6% |
| 2020 | 7,107 | −19.8% |

== History ==
The area of present-day Oguni was part of ancient Dewa Province and was ruled as part of Yonezawa Domain during the Edo period. After the start of the Meiji period, most of the area became part of Nishiokitama District, Yamagata Prefecture. The village of Ogunimoto was established on April 1, 1889, with the creation of the modern municipalities system. It was elevated to town status on November 3, 1943, becoming the town of Oguni. It absorbed the neighboring villages of Minamioguni and Kitaoguni on March 31, 1954, and the village of Tsugawa on August 1, 1960.

== Economy ==
The economy of Oguni is based on agriculture and forestry, and hydroelectric power production from numerous dams.

== Education ==
Oguni has two public elementary schools and two public middle schools operated by the town government and one public high school operated by the Yamagata Prefectural Board of Education. There is also one private high school.

== Transportation ==
=== Railway ===
East Japan Railway Company - Yonesaka Line

- Uzen-Numazawa - Isaryō - Uzen-Matsuoka - Oguni

=== Highway ===
- National Route 113
