= Yonezawa Women's Junior College =

Public junior women's college in Yonezawa, Yamagata, Japan

- 山形県立米沢女子短期大学
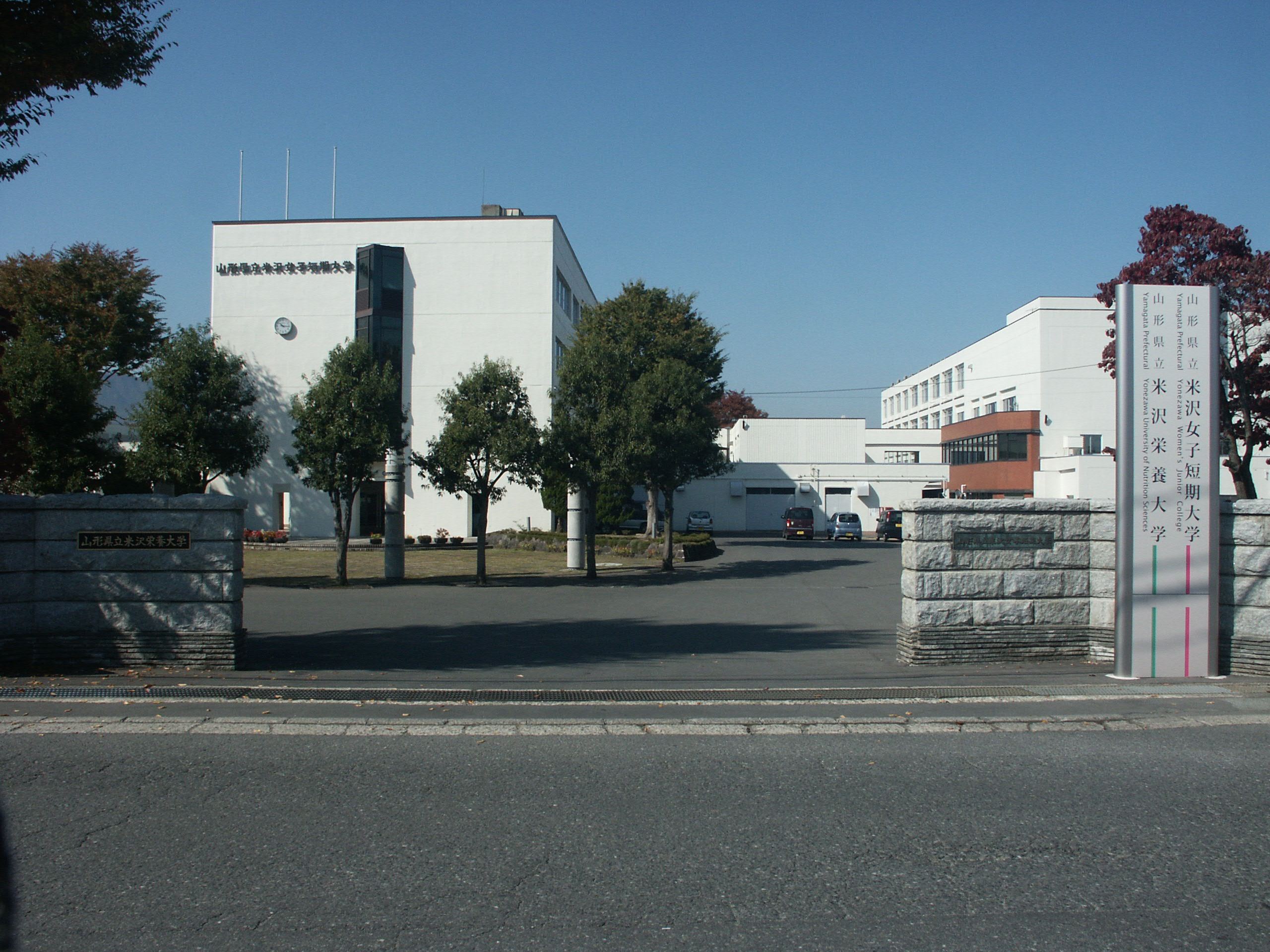
- Yonezawa Women's Junior College entrance
- Type: Public
- Established: 1952
- Location: Yonezawa, Yamagata, Japan; 37°53′27″N 140°07′24″E
- Website: www.yone.ac.jp

Yonezawa Women's Junior College (山形県立米沢女子短期大学, Yamagata-kenritsu Yonezawa joshi tanki daigaku) is a public junior women's college in Yonezawa, Yamagata, Japan, established in 1952.

In 2014 the Department of Health and Nutrition of the junior college was reorganized to a 4-year co-educational university, Yamagata Prefectural Yonezawa University of Nutrition Sciences.
