= Oguni Station =

Railway station in Oguni, Yamagata Prefecture, Japan

Oguni Station 小国駅
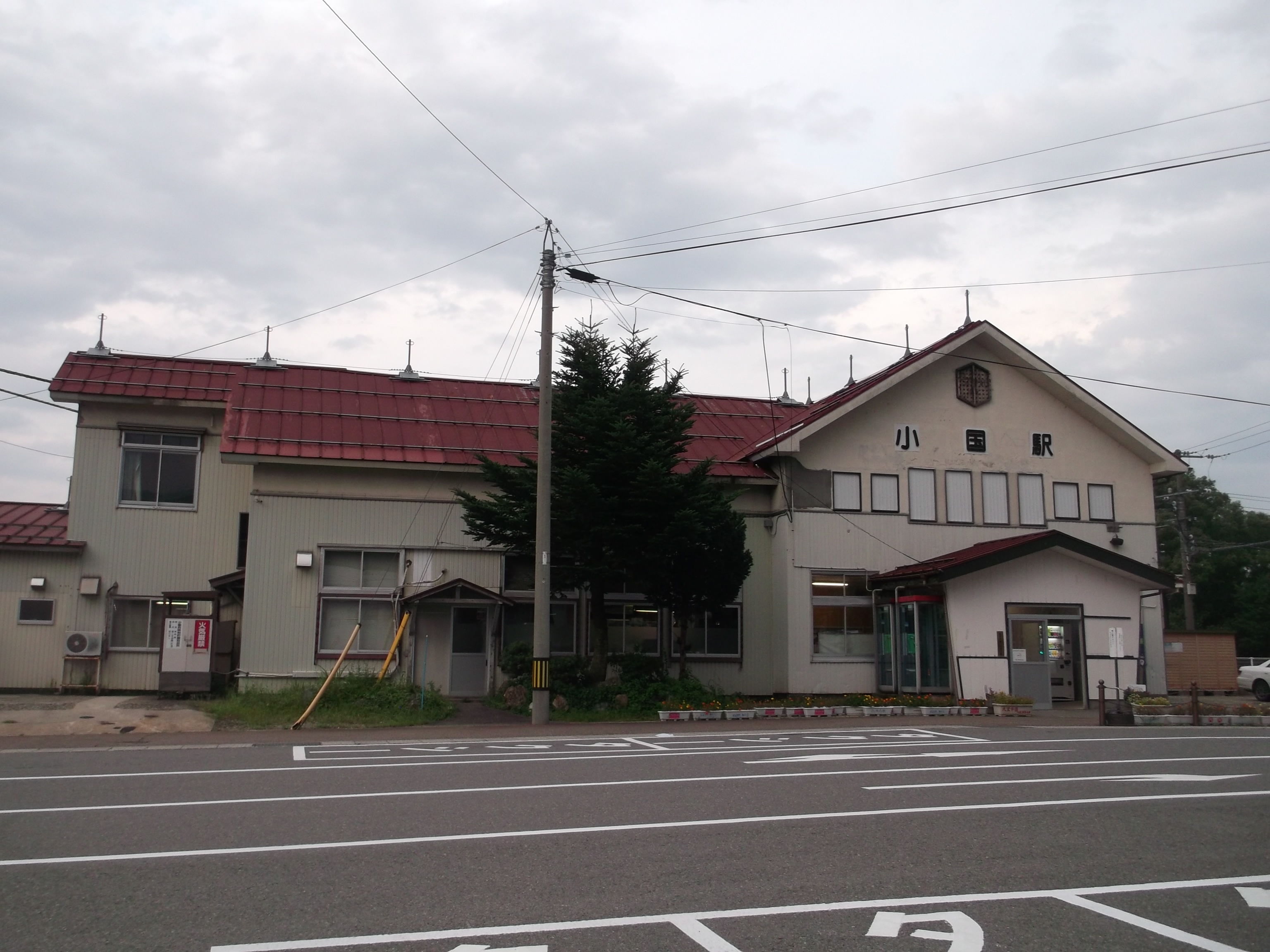
- Oguni Station in 2013

General information
- Location: Iwaisawa, Oguni-machi, Nishiokitama-gun, Yamagata-ken 999-1352; Japan
- Coordinates: 38°3′40.92″N 139°45′0.36″E
- Operator: JR East
- Line: ■ Yonesaka Line
- Distance: 58.3 km from Yonezawa
- Platforms: 1 side + 1 island platform

Other information
- Status: Staffed (Midori no Madoguchi )
- Website: Official website

History
- Opened: October 30, 1935

Passengers
- FY2018: 116

Services
Preceding station	JR East	Following station
Echigo-Kanamaru towards Sakamachi	Yonesaka Line	Uzen-Matsuoka towards Yonezawa
Location
- Location within Yamagata Prefecture Location within Japan

Oguni Station (小国駅, Oguni-eki) is a railway station in the town of Oguni, Yamagata Prefecture, Japan, operated by East Japan Railway Company (JR East).

== Lines ==
Oguni Station is served by the Yonesaka Line, and is located 58.3 rail kilometers from the terminus of the line at Yonezawa Station.

== Station layout ==
The station has one side platform and one island platform connected by a footbridge. The station has a Midori no Madoguchi staffed ticket office.

=== Platforms ===
1	■ Yonesaka Line	for Sakamachi
2	■ Yonesaka Line	for Imaizumi and Yonezawa
3	■ Yonesaka Line	not in normal use

== History ==
Oguni Station opened on October 30, 1935. The station was absorbed into the JR East network upon the privatization of JNR on April 1, 1987.

== Passenger statistics ==
In fiscal 2018, the station was used by an average of 116 passengers daily (boarding passengers only).

== Surrounding area ==
- Oguni Town Hall
- Oguni Post Office
- Oguni Police Station
- National Route 113

== See also ==
- List of railway stations in Japan
