= Yonezawa Station =

Railway station in Yonezawa, Yamagata Prefecture, Japan

Yonezawa Station 米沢駅
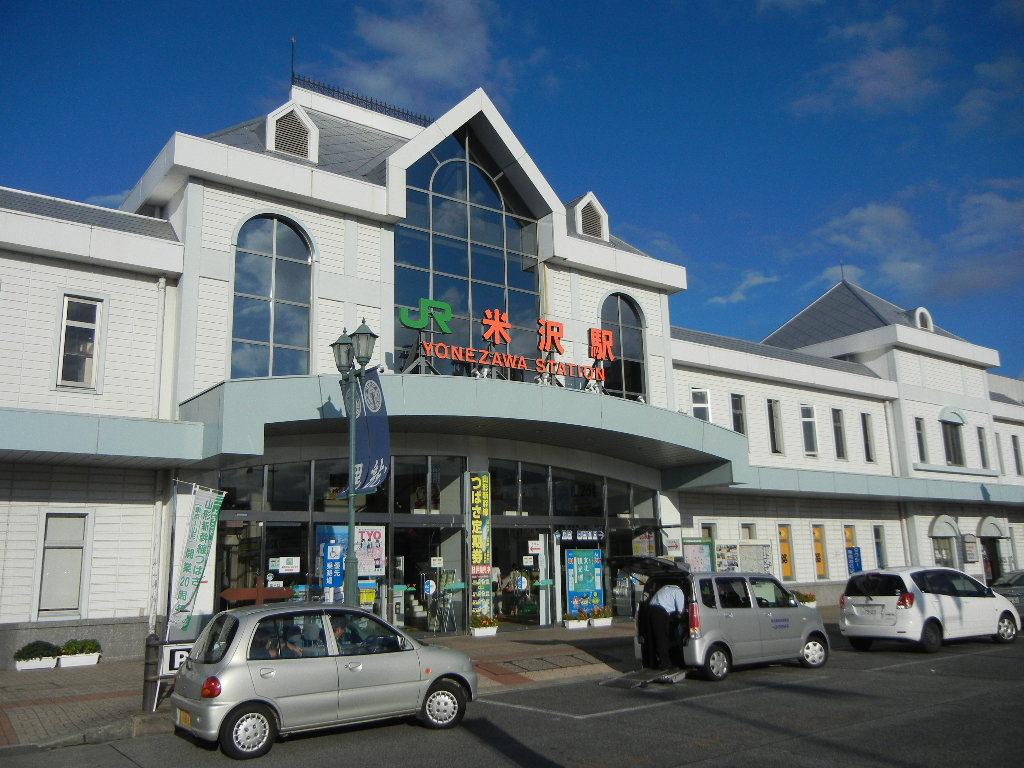
- Yonezawa Station in August 2012

Japanese name
- Shinjitai: 米沢駅
- Kyūjitai: 米澤驛
- Hiragana: よねざわえき

General information
- Location: 1-1-43, Ekimae, Yonezawa City, Yamagata Prefecture 992-0027; Japan
- Coordinates: 37°54′35″N 140°07′42″E
- Operator: JR East
- Lines: Yamagata Shinkansen; Ōu Main Line; Yonesaka Line
- Distance: 40.1 km (24.9 mi) from Fukushima
- Connections: Bus terminal

Other information
- Status: Staffed (Midori no Madoguchi)
- Website: Official website

History
- Opened: 15 May 1899; 127 years ago

Passengers
- FY2018: 2,389 daily

Services
Preceding station	JR East	Following station
Fukushima towards Tokyo	Yamagata Shinkansen Tsubasa	Takahata towards Shinjō
Sekine towards Fukushima	Yamagata Line	Oitama towards Shinjō
Minami-Yonezawa towards Sakamachi	Yonesaka Line	Terminus
Location
- Location within Yamagata Prefecture Location within Tohoku, Japan Location within Japan

Yonezawa Station (米沢駅, Yonezawa-eki) is a junction railway station in the city of Yonezawa, Yamagata, Japan, operated by East Japan Railway Company (JR East).

== Lines ==
Yonezawa Station is served by the Ōu Main Line and the Yamagata Shinkansen, and is located 40.1 kilometers from the starting point of both lines at Fukushima Station. It is also the eastern terminal station for the Yonesaka Line and is located 90.7 kilometers from the western terminal at Sakamachi.

== Station layout ==
Yonezawa Station is an elevated station with one partial bay platform used for tracks 1, 4 and 5 and one island platform, serving tracks 2 and 3. The station has a Midori no Madoguchi staffed ticket office.

=== Platforms ===
1	■ Yamagata Shinkansen	for Yamagata, Shinjō; For Fukushima, Utsunomiya, Ōmiya, and Tokyo
1	■ Yamagata Line	for Yamagata and Shinjō
2	■ Yamagata Shinkansen	for Yamagata and Shinjō; For Fukushima, Ōmiya, Utsunomiya, and Tokyo
2	■ Yamagata Line	for Akayu and Yamagata; For Fukushima
3	■ Yamagata Line	for Akayu and Yamagata; For Fukushima
4/5	■ Yonesaka Line	for Imaizumi, Oguni and Sakamachi

== History ==
Yonezawa Station opened on 15 May 1899. The station was absorbed into the JR East network upon the privatization of JNR on 1 April 1987. The Yamagata Shinkansen began operations from 1 July 1992. A new station building was completed in November 1993.

== Passenger statistics ==
In fiscal 2018, the station was used by an average of 2389 passengers daily (boarding passengers only).

== Surrounding area ==
- National Route 13
- National Route 121
- Yonezawa City Hall
- Yonezawa Post Office
- Uesugi Shrine
- Yonezawa Women's Junior College

== Famous Ekiben ==
- Gyukakuni bento - black beef served inside a container shaped like a cow's face; when the lid is removed Hanagasa Ondo is played

== See also ==
- List of railway stations in Japan
