= Sakamachi Station =

Railway station in Murakami, Niigata Prefecture, Japan

Sakamachi Station 坂町駅
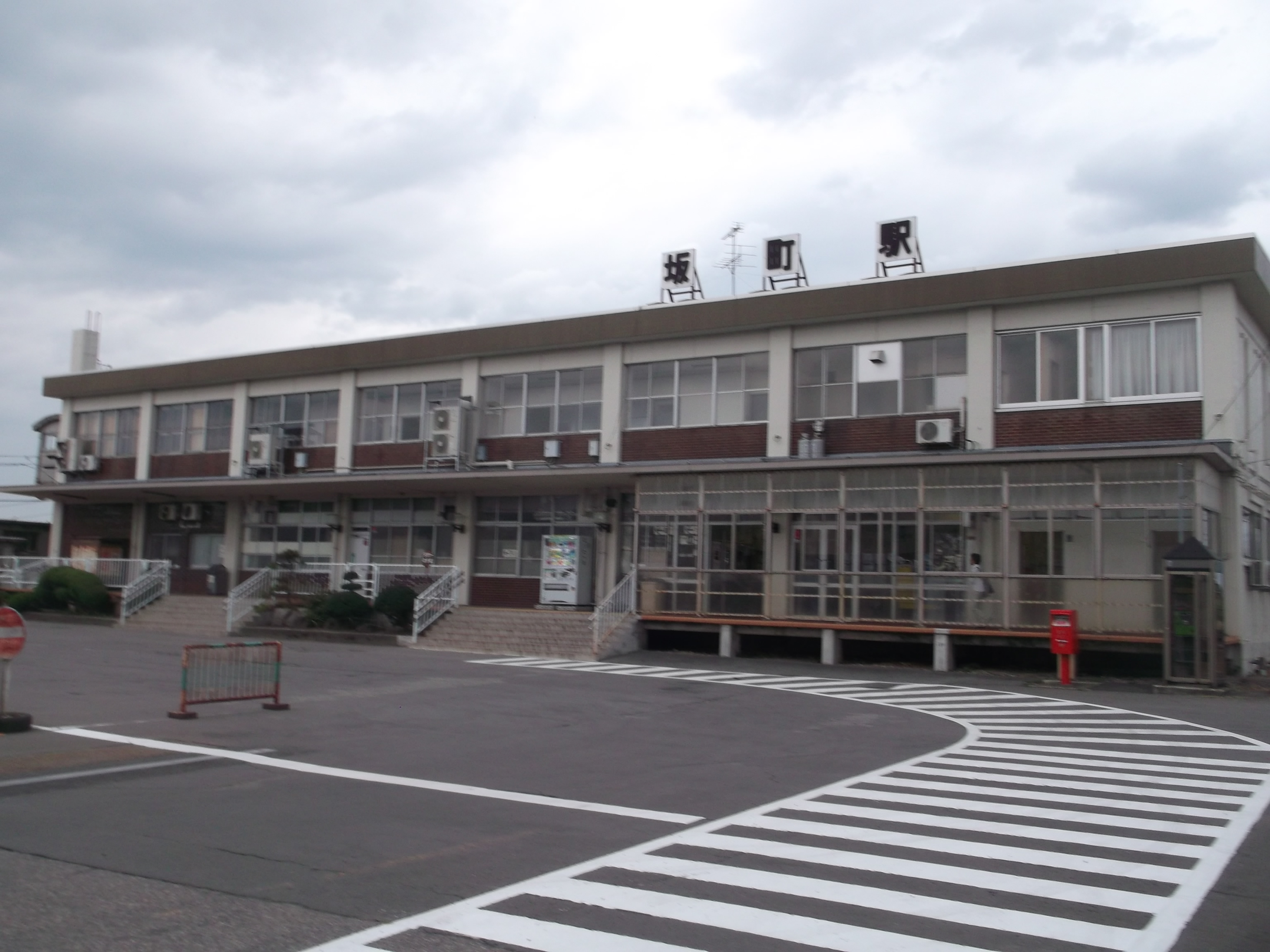
- Sakamachi Station, August 2013

General information
- Location: Sakamachi, Murakami-shi, Niigata-ken 959-3132; Japan
- Coordinates: 38°7′13.33″N 139°26′49.42″E
- Operator: JR East
- Lines: ■ Uetsu Main Line; ■ Yonesaka Line
- Distance: 48.0 km from Niitsu Station
- Platforms: 2 island platforms
- Tracks: 2

Other information
- Status: Staffed (Midori no Madoguchi)
- Website: www.jreast.co.jp/estation/station/info.aspx?StationCd=729

History
- Opened: 1 November 1914

Passengers
- FY2015: 734 daily

Services
Preceding station	JR East	Following station
Nakajō towards Niigata	Inaho	Murakami towards Akita
Hirakida towards Niitsu	Uetsu Main Line	Hirabayashi towards Akita
Terminus	Yonesaka Line	Echigo-Ōshima towards Yonezawa
Route map
Location
- Location within Japan

Sakamachi Station (坂町駅, Sakamachi-eki) is a railway station in the city of Murakami, Niigata, Japan, operated by East Japan Railway Company (JR East).

== Lines ==
Sakamachi Station is served by the Uetsu Main Line, and is 48.0 kilometers from the starting point of the line at Niitsu Station. It is also a terminus for the 90.7 kilometer Yonesaka Line. Services on the Yonesaka Line between here and Imaizumi station have been suspended since summer 2022 due to rainstorm damage. A replacement bus service is currently in operation.

== Station layout ==
The station consists of two island platforms connected by a footbridge. The station has a Midori no Madoguchi staffed ticket office.

=== Platforms ===
1	■ Yonesaka Line	for Oguni and Yonezawa
2	■ Uetsu Main Line	for Niigata and Niitsu
3	■ Uetsu Main Line	for Akita and Sakata
4	■ Yonesaka Line	(not in use)

== History ==
Sakamachi Station opened on 1 November 1914. A new station building was completed in 1963. With the privatization of Japanese National Railways (JNR) on 1 April 1987, the station came under the control of JR East.

== Passenger statistics ==
In fiscal 2017, the station was used by an average of 717 passengers daily (boarding passengers only).

== Surrounding area ==
- Sakamachi Post Office
- Niigata Prefectural Sakamachi Hospital

== See also ==
- List of railway stations in Japan
