= Miyauchi Station (Yamagata) =

Railway station in Nan'yō, Yamagata Prefecture, Japan

Miyauchi Station 宮内駅
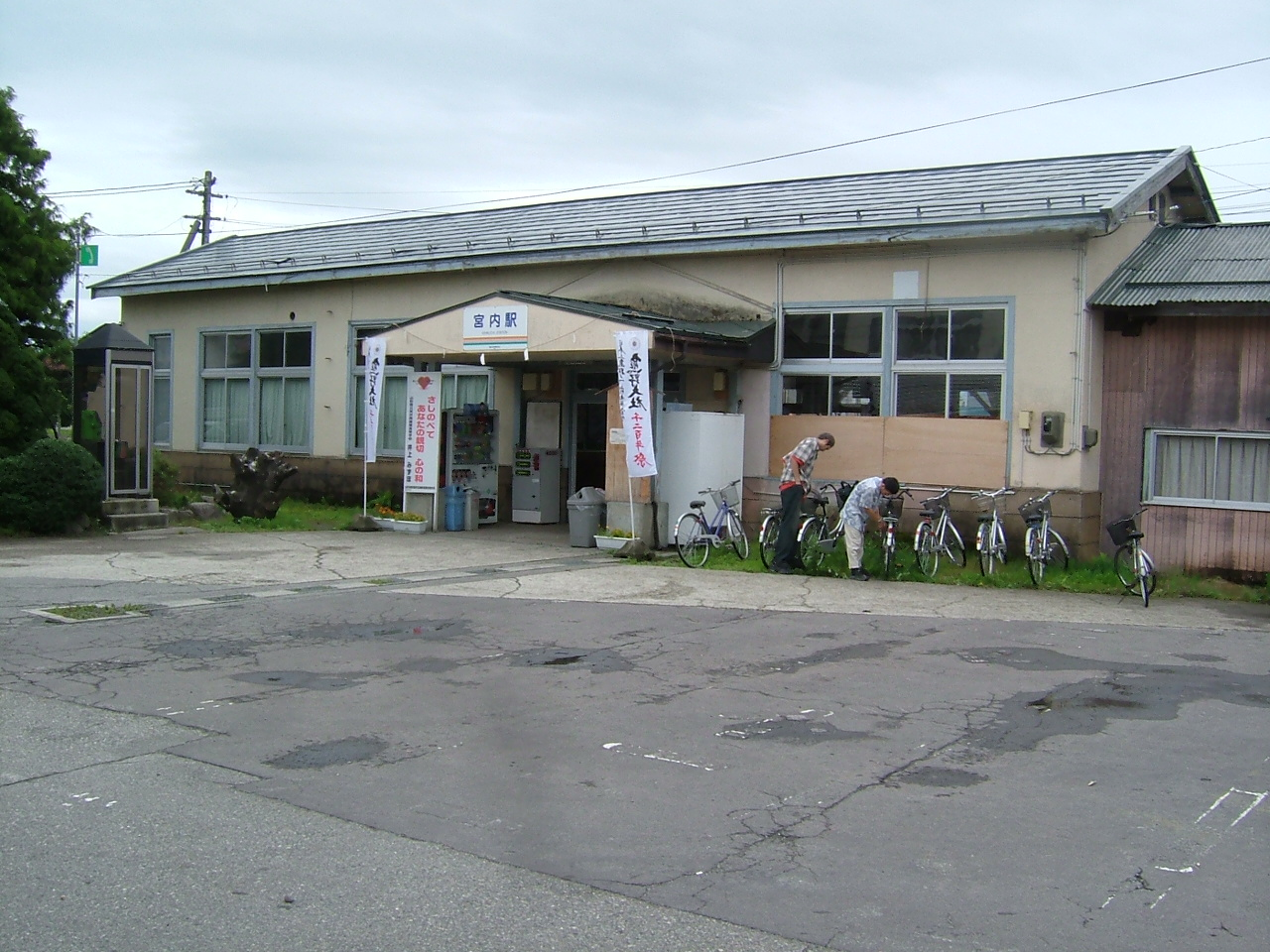
- Miyauchi Station

General information
- Location: Miyauchi, Nan'yō, Yamagata （山形県南陽市宮内） Japan
- Coordinates: 38°04′15″N 140°08′07″E
- Operator: Yamagata Railway
- Line: Flower Nagai Line

History
- Opened: 1913
- Former names: Miyauchi-chō (until 1988)

Passengers
- FY 2011: 311 daily
Location

Miyauchi Station (宮内駅, Miyauchi-eki) is a railway station in Nan'yō, Yamagata, Japan, operated by the Yamagata Railway.

== Lines ==
Miyauchi Station is a station on the Flower Nagai Line and is located 3.0 rail kilometers from the terminus of the line at Akayu Station.

== Station layout ==
Miyauchi Station has a single Island platform.

=== Platforms ===
1	■ Flower Nagai Line	for Akayu
2	■ Flower Nagai Line	for Imaizumi, Nagai and Arato

== Adjacent stations ==
«	Service	»
Flower Nagai Line
Nanyō-Shiyakusho	Local	Orihata

== History ==
Miyauchi Station opened on 26 October 1913 as Miyauchi-chō Station (宮内町駅, -Miyauchi-chō -eki). The station was absorbed into the JR East network upon the privatization of JNR on 1 April 1987.

It became a station on the Yamagata Railway from 25 October 1988, and was renamed to its present name on the same day.

== Surrounding area ==
- Mogami River
- Kumano Shrine
- National Route 113
