= Imaizumi Station =

Railway station in Nagai, Yamagata Prefecture, Japan

Imaizumi Station 今泉駅
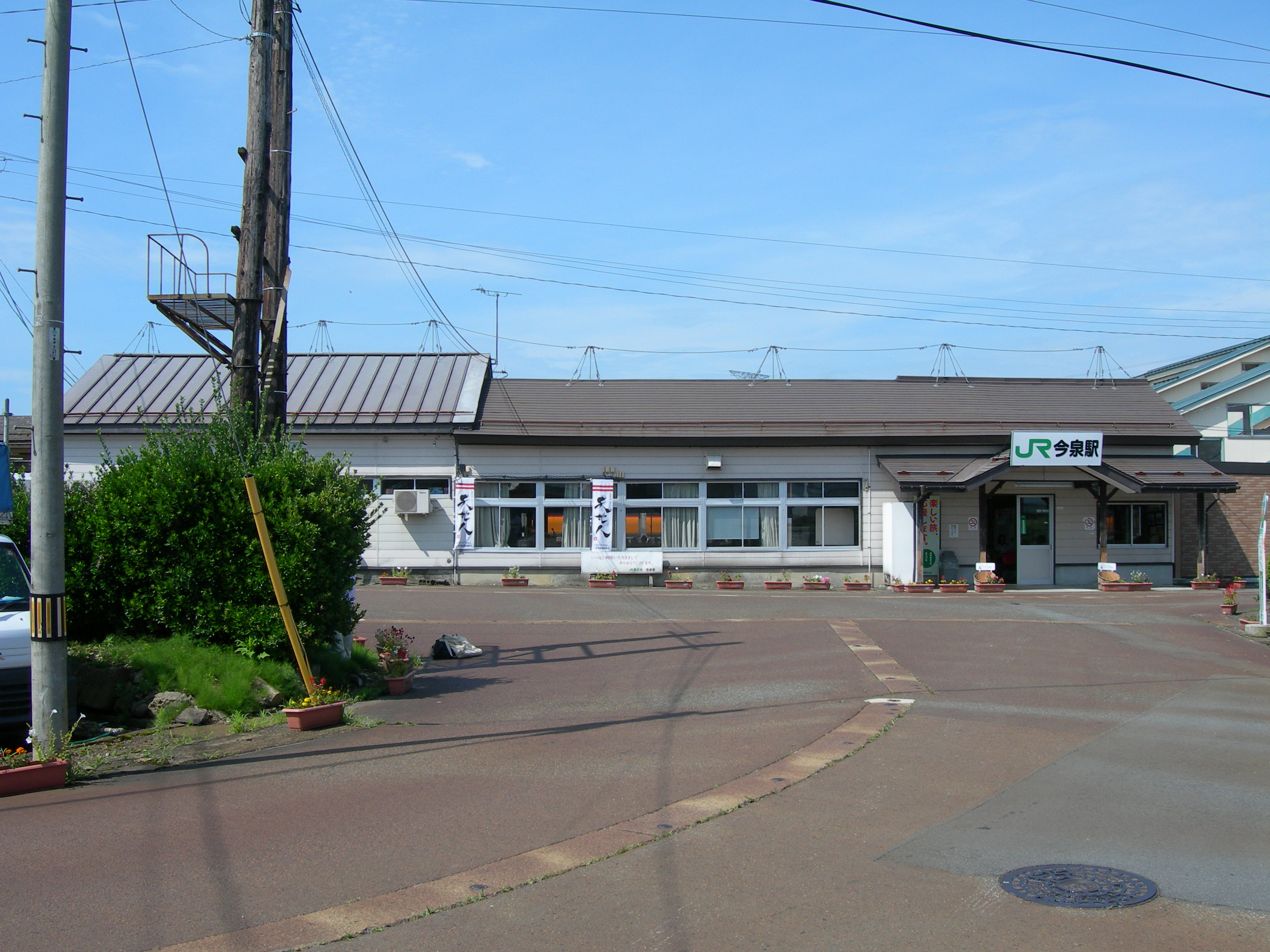
- Imaizumi Station in 2009

General information
- Location: Imaizumi, Nagai-shi, Yamagata-ken; Japan
- Coordinates: 38°03′24″N 140°02′39″E
- Operator: JR East; Yamagata Railway
- Lines: ■ Yonesaka Line; ■ Flower Nagai Line
- Distance: 23.0 km from Yonezawa
- Platforms: 2 island platforms

Other information
- Status: Staffed (Midori no Madoguchi)

History
- Opened: 15 November 1914

Passengers
- FY2016: 218(JR); 612 (Yamagata Railway) daily

Services
Preceding station	JR East	Following station
Hagyū towards Sakamachi	Yonesaka Line	Inukawa towards Yonezawa
Preceding station	Yamagata Railway	Following station
Tokiniwa towards Arato	Flower Nagai Line	Nishi-Ōtsuka towards Akayu
Location
- Location within Yamagata Prefecture Location within Japan

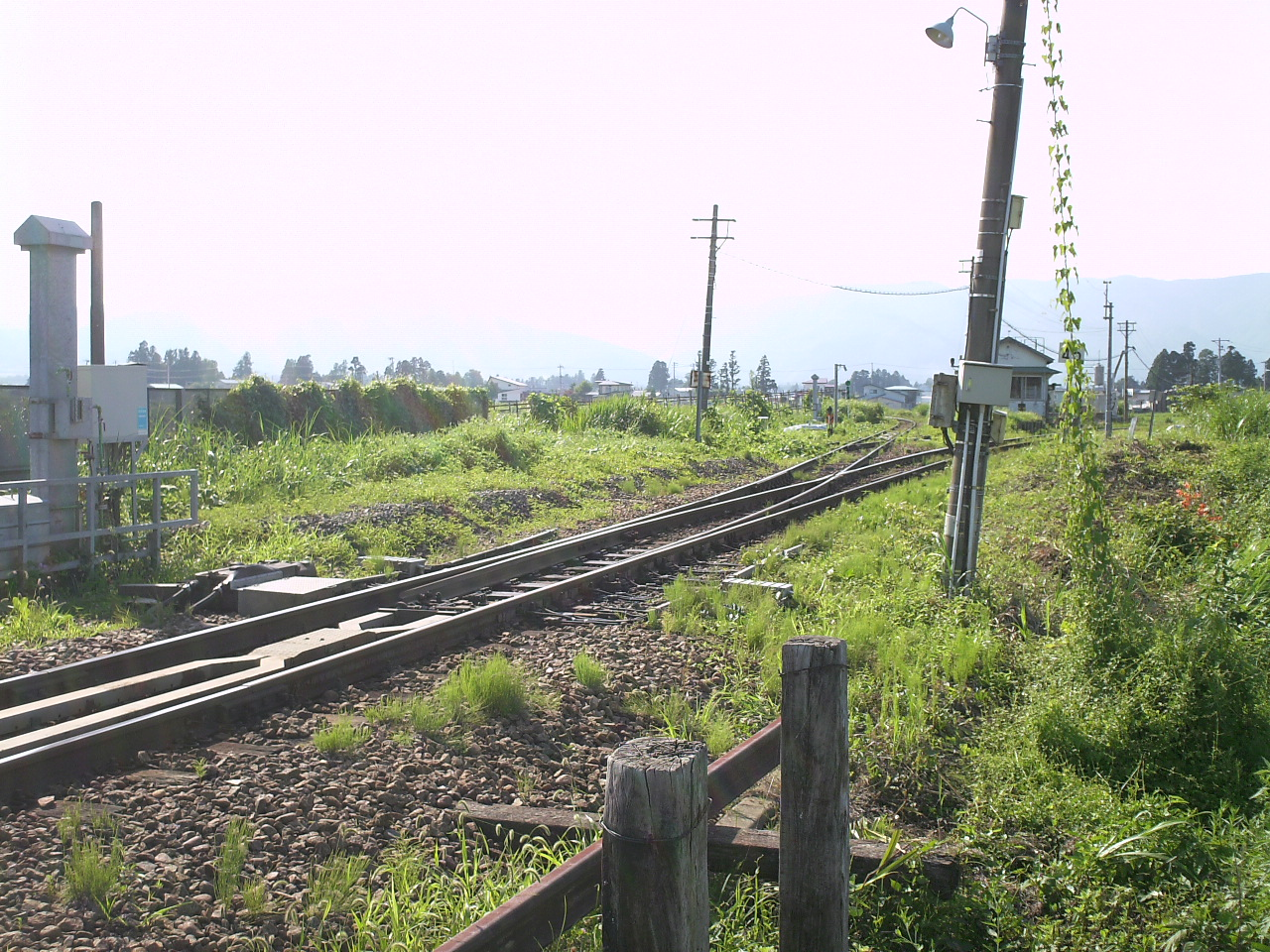
Shirakawa Junction left:Yonasaka Line for Hagyū right:Flower Nagai Line for Tokiniwa

Imaizumi Station (今泉駅, Imaizumi-eki) is a junction railway station in the city of Nagai, Yamagata, Japan, operated by the East Japan Railway Company (JR East) with the Yamagata Railway as a tenant.

== Lines ==
Imaizumi Station is a station on the JR East Yonesaka Line and is 23.0 rail kilometers from the terminus of the line at Yonezawa Station. It is also a station on the Yamagata Railway Flower Nagai Line, and is located 12.2 rail kilometers from the terminus of the line at Akayu Station.

== Station layout ==
The station has two island platforms serving four tracks connected to the station building by a footbridge. The station has a Midori no Madoguchi staffed ticket office.

=== Platforms ===
1	■ Flower Nagai Line	for Miyauchi and Akayu
2	■ Flower Nagai Line	for Nagai and Arato
3	■ Yonesaka Line	for Uzen-Komatsu and Yonezawa
4	■ Yonesaka Line	for Uzen-Tsubaki, Oguni and Sakamachi for Uzen-Komatsu and Yonezawa

== History ==
Imaizumi Station opened on 15 November 1914 as a station on the Nagai Light Railway Line. The Yonesaka Line began operations from 28 September 1926. The station was absorbed into the JR East network upon the privatization of JNR on 1 April 1987, and became a station on the Yamagata Railway from 25 October 1988.

The Yonesaka Line (Imaizumi - Hagyū) and Flower Nagai Line (Imaizumi - Tokiniwa) share about 2 km of track. The junction point was called Shirakawa Junction (白川信号場, Shirakawa shingōjō).

== Passenger statistics ==
In fiscal 2016, the JR portion of the station was used by an average of 218 passengers daily (boarding passengers only). and the Yamagata Railway portion of the station was used by 612 passengers daily

== Surrounding area ==
- National Route 113
- National Route 287
- Okitama Public General Hospital

== See also ==
- List of railway stations in Japan
