= Nishi-Ōtsuka Station =

Railway station in Kawanishi, Yamagata Prefecture, Japan

Nishi-Ōtsuka Station 西大塚駅
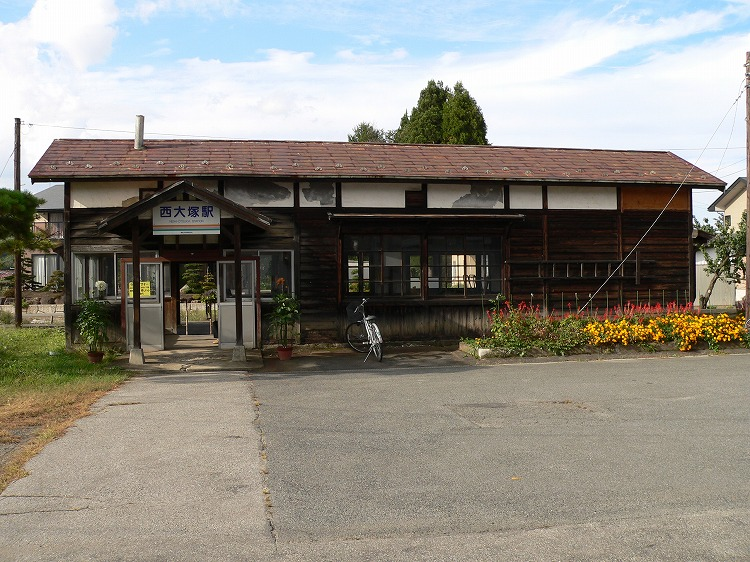
- Nishi-Ōtsuka station

General information
- Location: Nishiotsuka, Kawanishi-machi, Higashiokitama-gun, Yamagata-ken 992-0601; Japan
- Coordinates: 38°03′20″N 140°03′53″E
- Operator: Yamagata Railway
- Line: ■ Flower Nagai Line
- Distance: 10.3 km from Akayu
- Platforms: 1 side platform

Other information
- Status: Unstaffed

History
- Opened: 15 November 1914

Passengers
- FY 2017: 18 daily
Location
- Location within Yamagata Prefecture Location within Japan

Nishi-Ōtsuka Station (西大塚駅, Nishi-Ōtsuka eki) is a railway station in the town of Kawanishi, Yamagata, Japan, operated by the Yamagata Railway.

== Lines ==
Nishi-Ōtsuka Station is a station on the Flower Nagai Line, and is located 10.3 rail kilometers from the terminus of the line at Akayu Station.

== Station layout ==
The station has one side platform serving a single bi-directional track. The station is unattended.

== Adjacent stations ==
«	Service	»
Flower Nagai Line
Ringō	Local	Imaizumi

== History ==
Nishi-Ōtsuka Station opened on 15 November 1914. The station was absorbed into the JR East network upon the privatization of JNR on 1 April 1987, and became a station on the Yamagata Railway from 25 October 1988.

== Surrounding area ==
- Mogami River
- National Route 113
- National Route 287
- Okitama Public General Hospital

== See also ==
- List of railway stations in Japan
