= Shikinosato Station =

Railway station in Shirataka, Yamagata Prefecture, Japan

Shikinosato Station 四季の郷駅
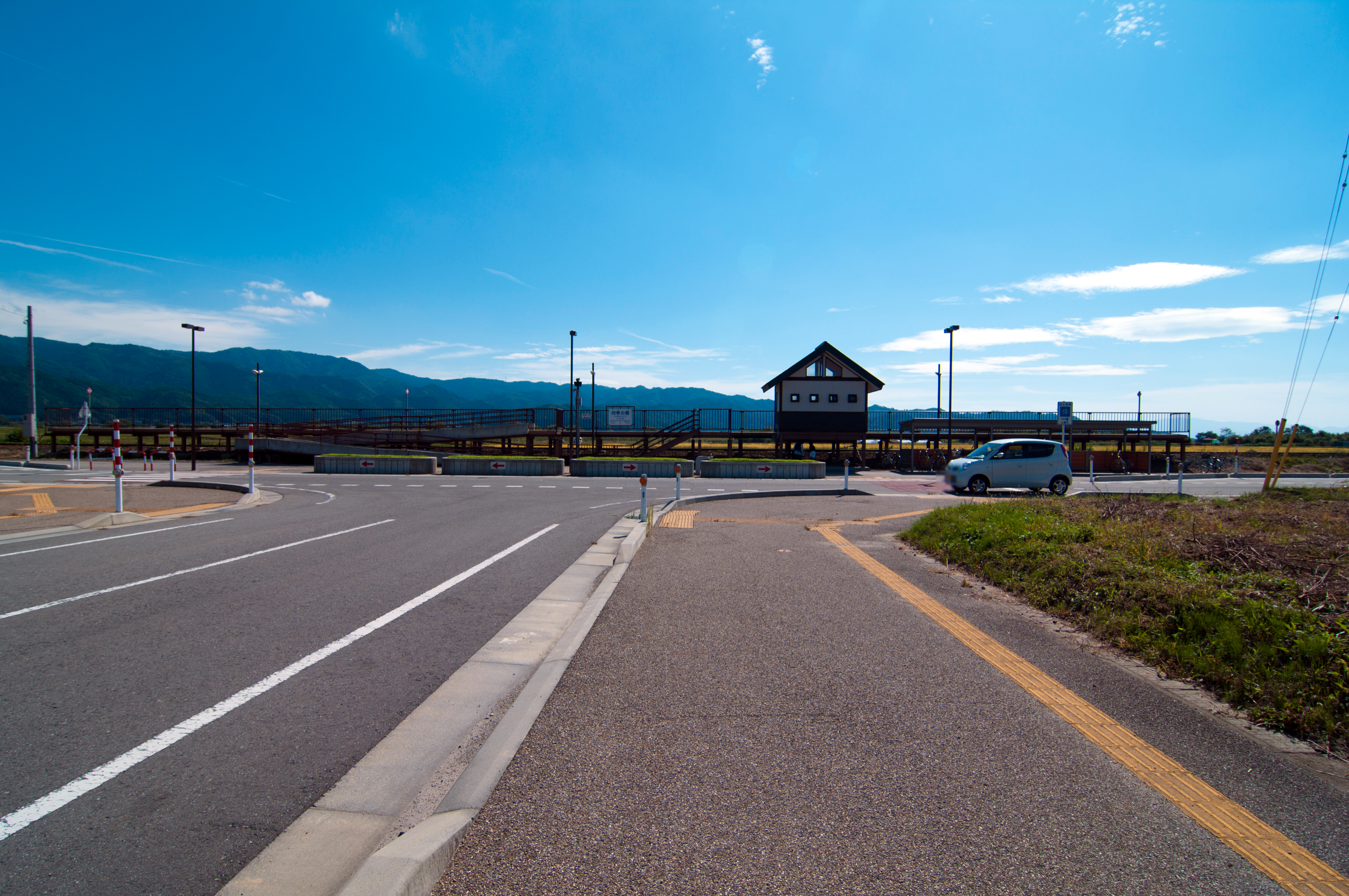
- Shikinosato Station (Oct. 2010)

General information
- Location: Ayukai, Shirataka, Nishiokitama, Yamagata （山形県西置賜郡白鷹町鮎貝） Japan
- Coordinates: 38°11′09″N 140°04′39″E
- Operator: Yamagata Railway
- Line: Flower Nagai Line

History
- Opened: 2007

Passengers
- FY 2011: 41 daily
Location

Shikinosato Station (四季の郷駅, Shiki-no-sato-eki) is a railway station in Shirataka, Yamagata, Japan, operated by the Yamagata Railway.

== Lines ==
Shikinosato Station is a station on the Flower Nagai Line, and is located 28.5 rail kilometers from the terminus of the line at Akayu Station.

== Station layout ==
Shikinosato Station has a single side platform serving traffic in both directions

== Adjacent stations ==
«	Service	»
Flower Nagai Line
Ayukai	Local	Arato

== History ==
Shikinosato Station opened on 13 October 2007.

== Surrounding area ==
- Mogami River
- Shirataka Driving School
- Ayukai Post Office
