= Ringō Station =

Railway station in Nan'yō, Yamagata Prefecture, Japan

Ringō Station 梨郷駅
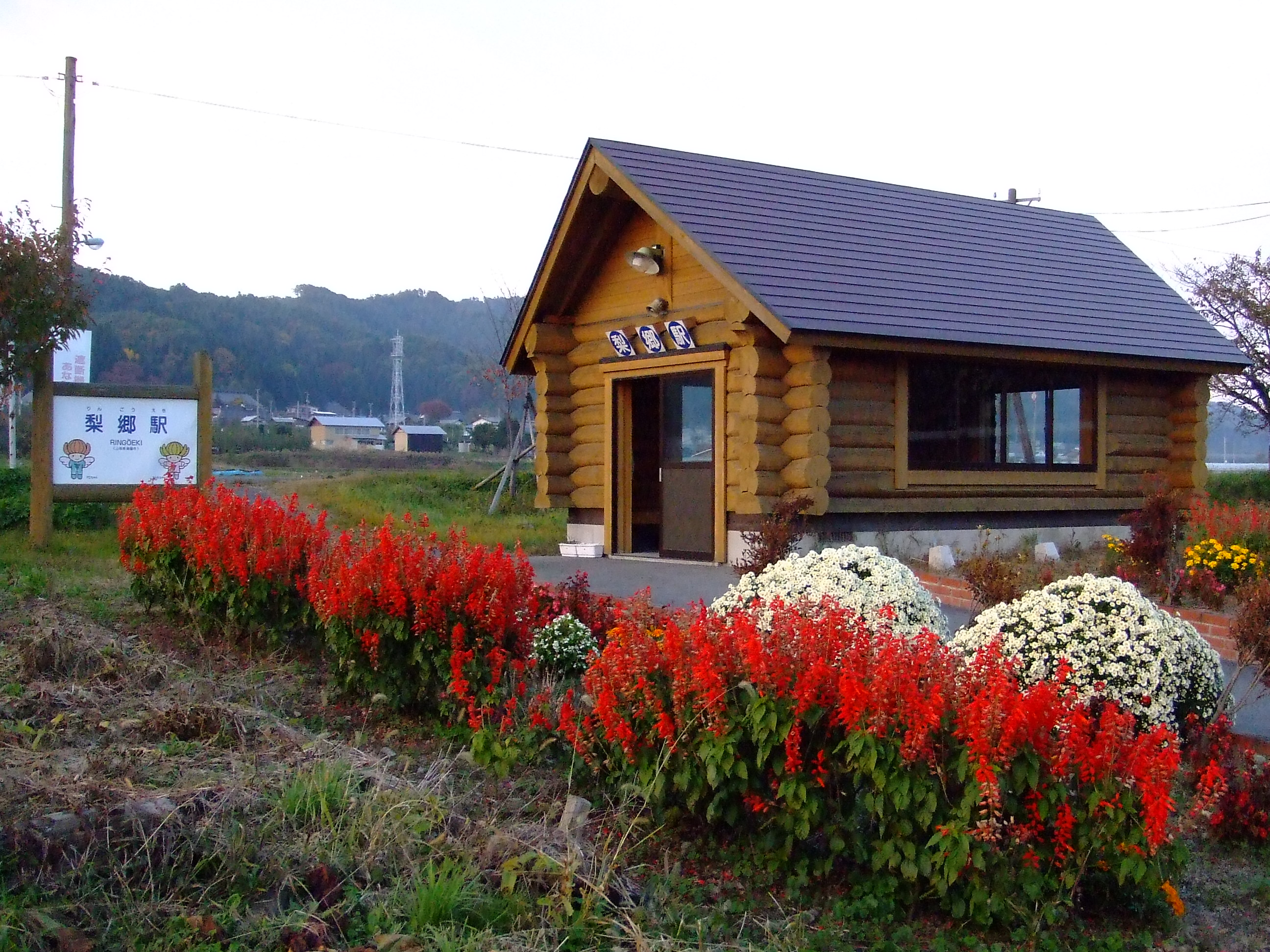
- Ringō Station

General information
- Location: Takehara, Nan'yō, Yamagata （山形県南陽市竹原） Japan
- Coordinates: 38°03′26″N 140°05′53″E
- Operator: Yamagata Railway
- Line: Flower Nagai Line

History
- Opened: 1913

Passengers
- FY 2011: 24 daily
Location

Ringō Station (梨郷駅, Ringō-eki) is a railway station in Nan'yō, Yamagata, Japan, operated by the Yamagata Railway.

== Lines ==
Ringō Station is a station on the Flower Nagai Line, and is located 6.8 rail kilometers from the terminus of the line at Akayu Station.

== Station layout ==
Ringō Station has a single side platform serving traffic in both directions. The station is unattended.

== Adjacent stations ==
«	Service	»
Flower Nagai Line
Orihata	Local	Nishi-Ōtsuka

== History ==
Ringō Station opened on 26 October 1913. The station was absorbed into the JR East network upon the privatization of JNR on 1 April 1987, and became a station on the Yamagata Railway from 25 October 1988. A new station building in the style of a log cabin was completed in July 1999.

== Surrounding area ==
- Mogami River
- National Route 113
