= Orihata Station =

Railway station in Nan'yō, Yamagata Prefecture, Japan

Orihata Station おりはた駅
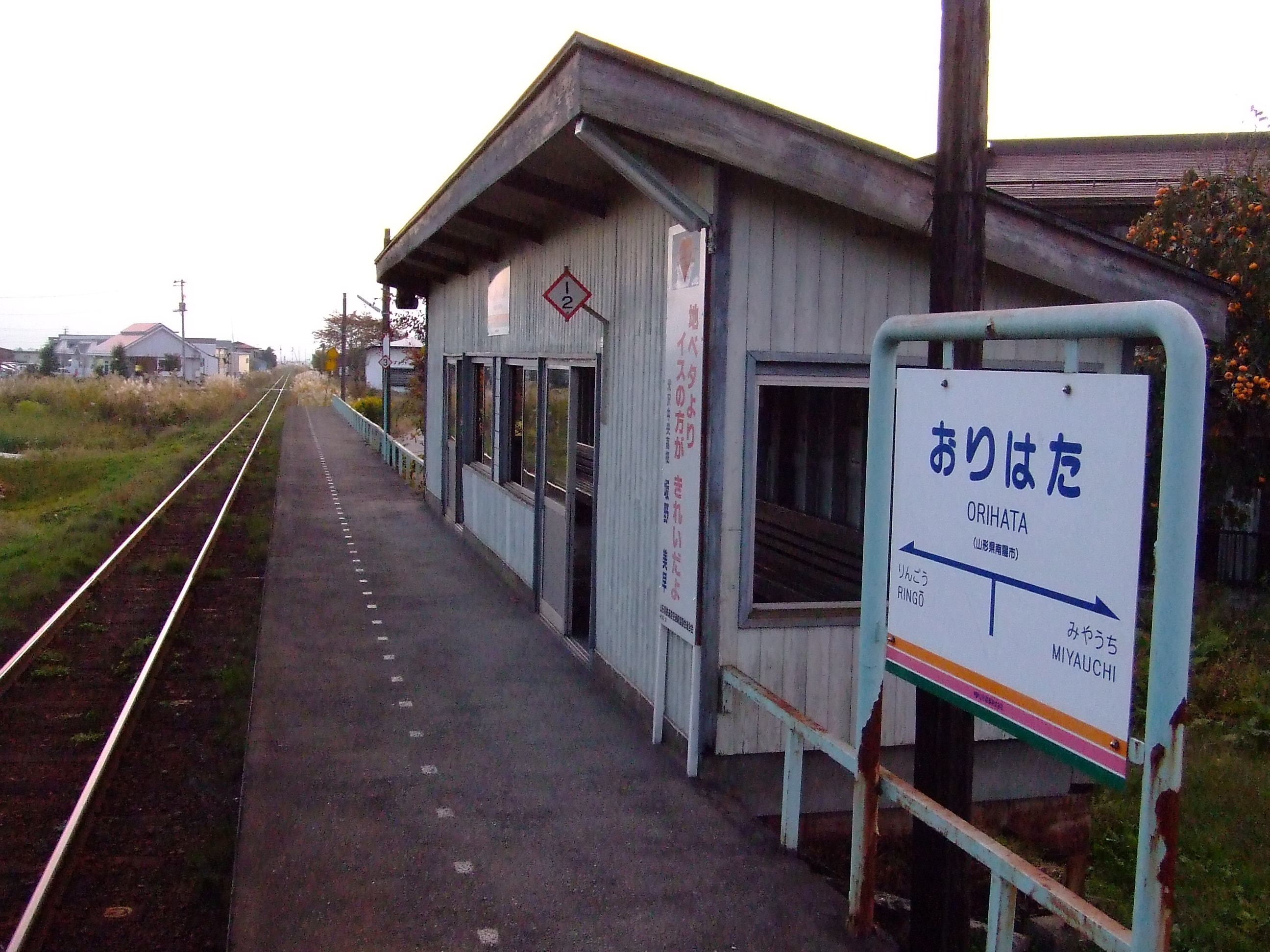
- Orihata Station (October 2006)

General information
- Location: Urushiyama, Nan'yō, Yamagata （山形県南陽市漆山） Japan
- Coordinates: 38°03′59″N 140°07′21″E
- Operator: Yamagata Railway
- Line: Flower Nagai Line

History
- Opened: 1959
- Former names: Nishi-Miyauchi (until 1988)

Passengers
- FY 2011: 46 daily
Location

Orihata Station (おりはた駅, Orihata-eki) is a railway station in Nan'yō, Yamagata, Japan, operated by the Yamagata Railway.

== Lines ==
Orihata Station is a station on the Flower Nagai Line, and is located 4.4 rail kilometers from the terminus of the line at Akayu Station.

== Station layout ==
Orihata Station has a single side platform serving traffic in both directions. The station is unattended.

== Adjacent stations ==
| « | Service | » |
Flower Nagai Line
| Miyauchi | Local | Ringō |

== History ==
Orihata Station opened on 1 June 1959 as Nishi-Miyauchi Station (西宮内駅, Nishi-Miyauchi-eki). The station was absorbed into the JR East network upon the privatization of JNR on 1 April 1987.

It and became a station on the Yamagata Railway from 25 October 1988, and was renamed to its present name on the same day.

== Surrounding area ==
- Mogami River
- Orihata River
- Route 113
