= Koguwa Station =

Railway station in Shirataka, Yamagata Prefecture, Japan

Koguwa Station 蚕桑駅
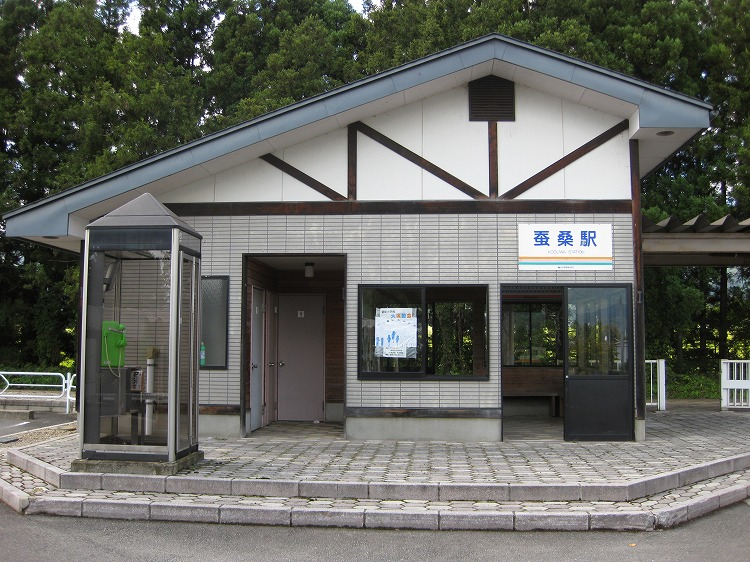
- Koguwa Station building in September 2009

General information
- Location: Takadama, Shirataka, Nishiokitama, Yamagata （山形県西置賜郡白鷹町高玉） Japan
- Coordinates: 38°09′41″N 140°02′48″E
- Operator: Yamagata Railway
- Line: Flower Nagai Line

History
- Opened: 1922

Passengers
- FY 2011: 33 daily
Location

Koguwa Station (蚕桑駅, Koguwa eki) is a railway station in Shirataka, Yamagata, Japan, operated by the Yamagata Railway.

== Lines ==
Koguwa Station is a station on the Flower Nagai Line, and is located 24.6 rail kilometers from the terminus of the line at Akayu Station.

== Station layout ==
Koguwa Station has a single side platform serving traffic in both directions.

== Adjacent stations ==
«	Service	»
Flower Nagai Line
Shirousagi	Local	Ayukai

== History ==
Koguwa Station opened on 11 December 1922. The station was absorbed into the JR East network upon the privatization of JNR on 1 April 1987, and became a station on the Yamagata Railway from 25 October 1988. A new station building was completed in April 2004.

== Surrounding area ==
- Mogami River
