= Tokiniwa Station =

Railway station in Nagai, Yamagata Prefecture, Japan

Tokiniwa Station 時庭駅
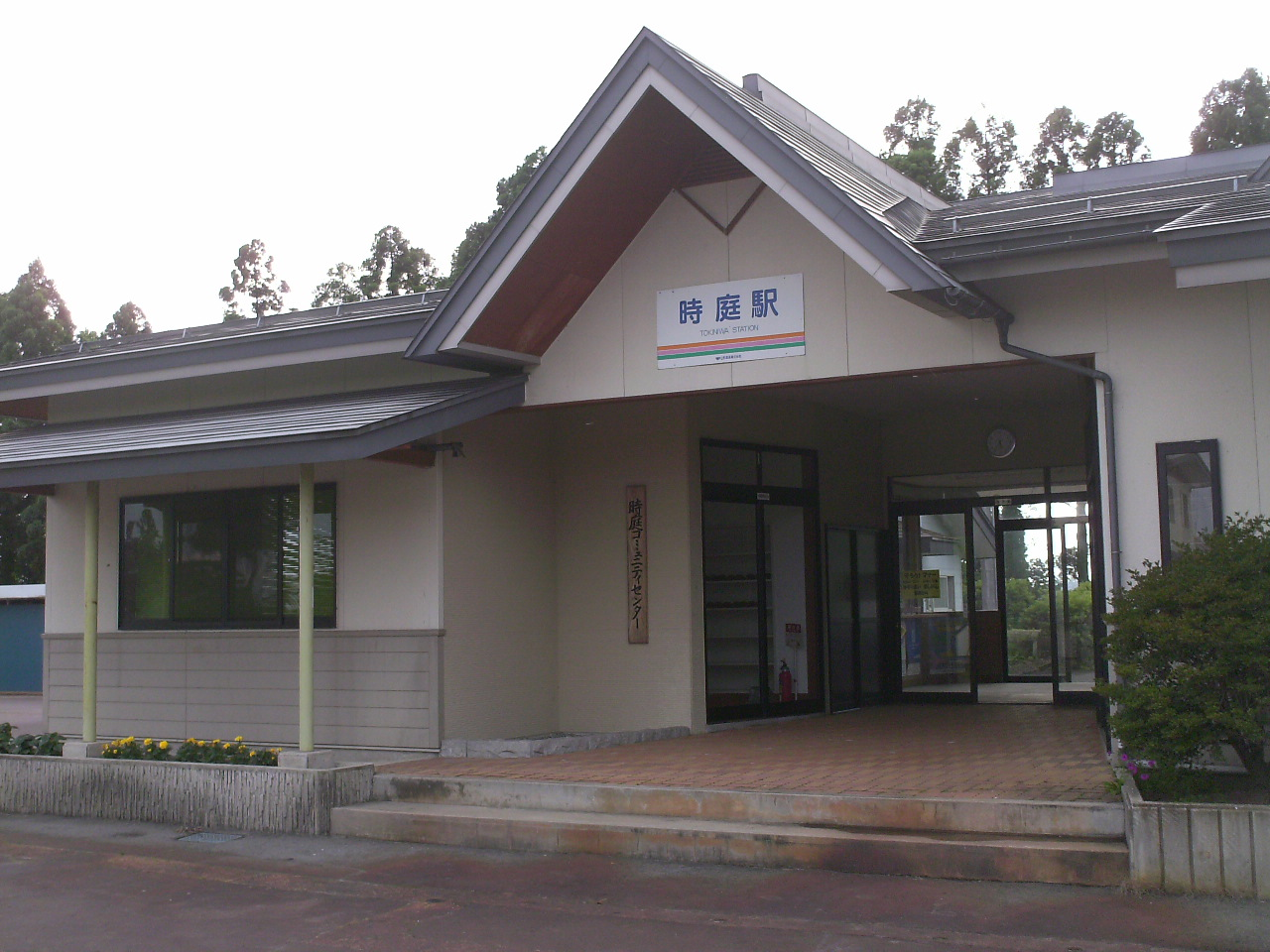
- Tokiniwa Station

General information
- Location: Sakae-machi, Nagai, Yamagata （山形県長井市時庭） Japan
- Coordinates: 38°04′36″N 140°01′46″E
- Operator: Yamagata Railway
- Line: Flower Nagai Line

History
- Opened: 1914

Passengers
- FY 2011: 15 daily
Location

Tokiniwa Station (時庭駅, Tokiniwa eki) is a railway station in Nagai, Yamagata, Japan, operated by the Yamagata Railway.

== Lines ==
Tokiniwa Station is a station on the Flower Nagai Line, and is located 14.9 rail kilometers from the terminus of the line at Akayu Station.

== Station layout ==
Tokiniwa Station has a single side platform serving traffic in both directions.

== Adjacent stations ==
«	Service	»
Flower Nagai Line
Imaizumi	Local	Minami-Nagai

== History ==
Tokiniwa Station opened on 15 November 1914. The station was absorbed into the JR East network upon the privatization of JNR on 1 April 1987, and became a station on the Yamagata Railway from 25 October 1988.

== Surrounding area ==
- National Route 287
