= Minami-Nagai Station =

Railway station in Nagai, Yamagata Prefecture, Japan

Minami-Nagai Station 南長井駅
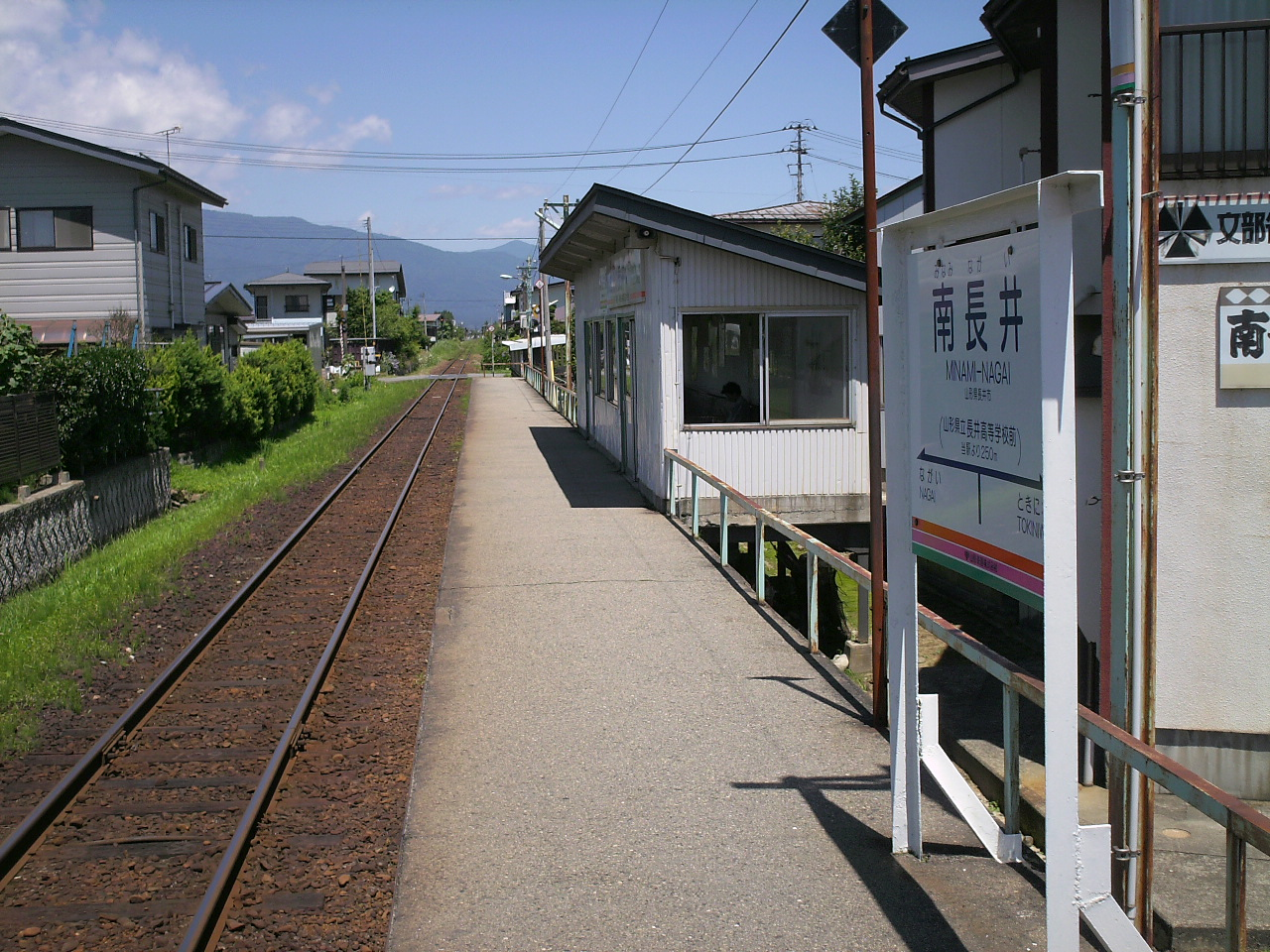
- Minami-Nagai Station

General information
- Location: Yotsuya 1-chōme, Nagai, Yamagata （山形県長井市四ツ谷1丁目） Japan
- Coordinates: 38°05′51″N 140°02′04″E
- Operator: Yamagata Railway
- Line: Flower Nagai Line

History
- Opened: 1960

Passengers
- FY 2011: 258 daily
Location

Minami-Nagai Station (南長井駅, Minami-Nagai eki) is a railway station in Nan'yō, Yamagata, Japan, operated by the Yamagata Railway.

== Lines ==
Minami-Nagai Station is a station on the Flower Nagai Line, and is located 6.8 rail kilometers (about 4 rail miles) from the terminus of the line at Akayu Station.

== Station layout ==
Minami-Nagai Station has a single side platform serving traffic in both directions. The station is unattended.

== Adjacent stations ==
«	Service	»
Flower Nagai Line
Tokiniwa	Local	Nagai

== History ==
Minami-Nagai Station opened on 20 May 1960.

== Surrounding area ==
- Nagai Summary Court
- National Route 287
