= Ayukai Station =

Railway station in Shirataka, Yamagata Prefecture, Japan

Ayukai Station 鮎貝駅
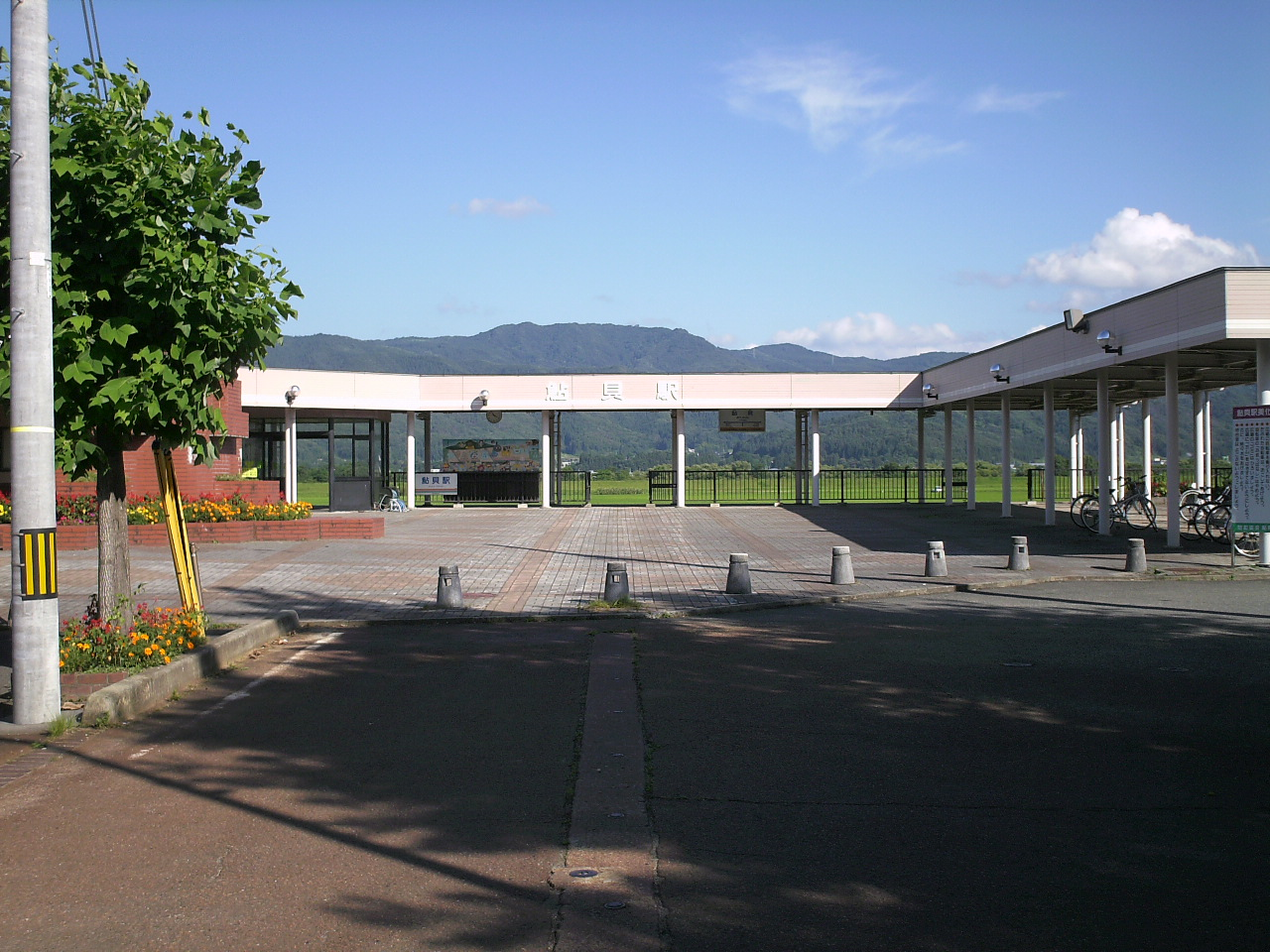
- Ayukai Station in July 2007

General information
- Location: Ayukai, Shirataka, Nishiokitama, Yamagata （山形県西置賜郡白鷹町鮎貝） Japan
- Coordinates: 38°10′57″N 140°04′16″E
- Operator: Yamagata Railway
- Line: Flower Nagai Line
- Connections

History
- Opened: 1922

Passengers
- FY 2011: 71 daily
Location

Ayukai Station (鮎貝駅, Ayukai eki) is a railway station in Shirataka, Yamagata, Japan, operated by the Yamagata Railway.

== Lines ==
Ayukai Station is a station on the Flower Nagai Line, and is located 27.9 rail kilometers from the terminus of the line at Akayu Station.

== Station layout ==
Ayukai Station has a single side platform serving traffic in both directions.

== Adjacent stations ==
«	Service	»
Flower Nagai Line
Koguwa	Local	Shikinosato

== History ==
Ayukawa Station opened on 11 December 1922. The station was absorbed into the JR East network upon the privatization of JNR on 1 April 1987, and came under the control of the Yamagata Railway from 25 October 1988.

== Surrounding area ==
- Mogami River
