= Flower Nagai Line =

Railway line in Yamagata prefecture, Japan

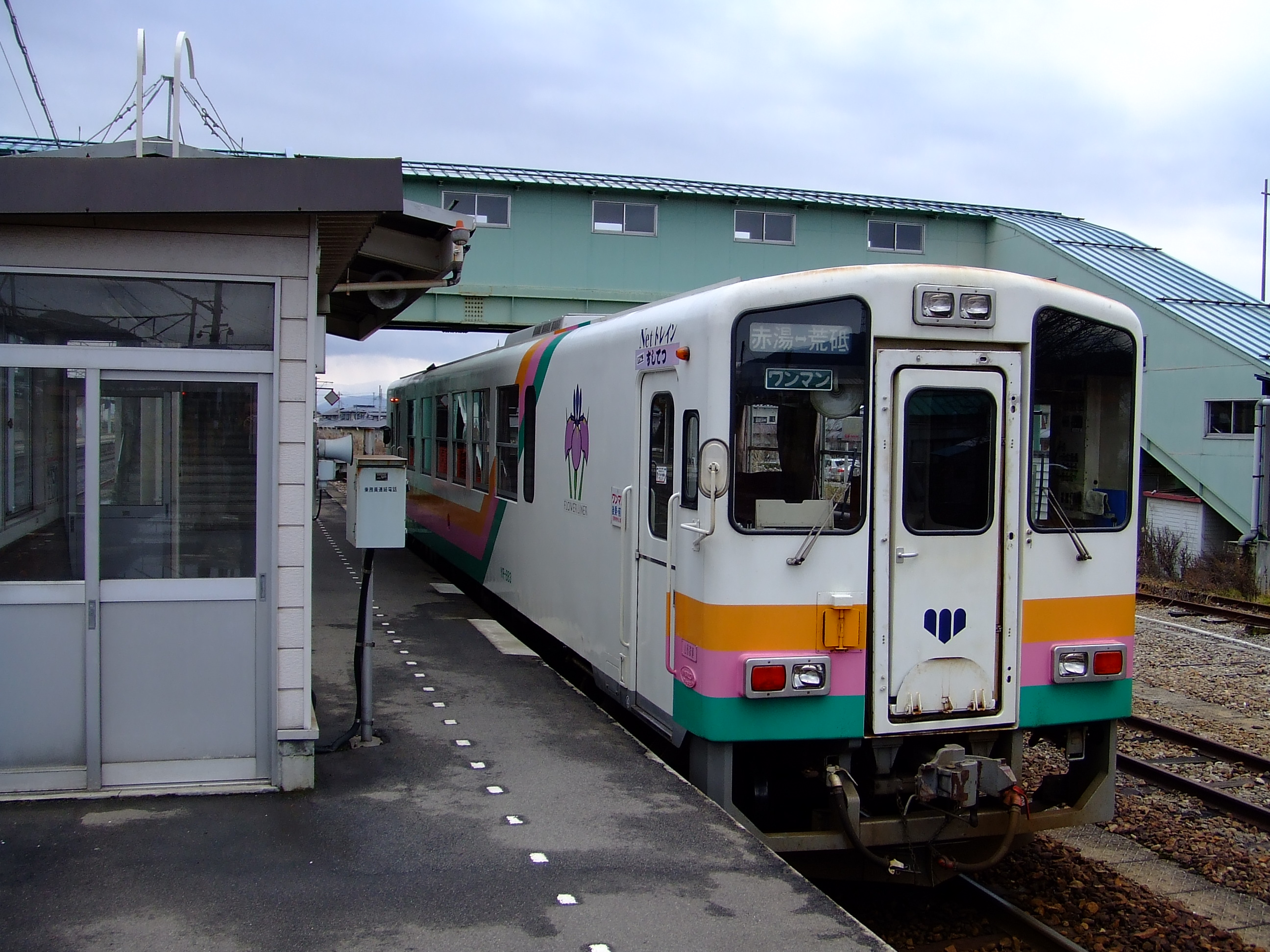
- A Flower Nagai Line train at Akayu station in December 2006

Overview
- Native name: フラワー長井線
- Status: In operation
- Owner: Yamagata Railway
- Locale: Yamagata Prefecture
- Termini: Akayu; Arato
- Stations: 17

Service
- Type: Regional rail
- Operator: Yamagata Railway
- Rolling stock: YR-880 series DMU

History
- Opened: 1913

Technical
- Line length: 30.5 km (19.0 mi)
- Num of tracks: Entire line single tracked
- Character: Rural
- Track gauge: 1,067 mm (3 ft 6 in)
- Electrification: None
- Operating speed: 85 km/h (53 mph)

The Flower Nagai Line (フラワー長井線, Furawā-Nagai-sen) is a Japanese railway line in Yamagata Prefecture, Japan. It connects Akayu Station in Nanyō to Arato Station in Shirataka.

The Flower Nagai Line is the only line operated by Yamagata Railway Company (山形鉄道, Yamagata Tetsudō), a third-sector railway company which took over the former JR East line in 1988.

In 2005, Yamagata Railway was in danger of having to shut down due to low patronage, leaving many residents, especially the young and old, without a mode of transportation from their farms. The only option available to the company was to try to attract more tourists to the scenic views. A lone train operator, Tatsuo Asakura, working without the knowledge of his superiors, increased out-of-town passengers from 350 in 2005 to 7,000 in 2006, and in September 2008 had entertained more than 20,000 tourists with his uplifting guided tours, spoken in local dialect.

== Operation ==
Six single-car diesel multiple units (YR-880 Series) serve the line, running from Akayu to Arato once every one to two hours.

== Rolling Stock ==
=== YR-880 Series ===
Eight single-car diesel multiple units were built by Niigata Transys in 1988 and 1990 for the Flower Nagai Line, using the Niigata Transys NDC model. Six units exist as of 2018. One unit, YR-881 has been scrapped in 2003, and YR-885 had been scrapped in 2015.

=== MCR4A Series ===
A snow blower car manufactured by Niigata Transys, one unit has been manufactured.

== History ==
- October 26, 1913: Akayu - Ringō section opens
- November 15, 1914: Ringō - Nagai section opens
- December 11, 1922: Nagai - Ayukai section opens
- April 22, 1923: Ayukai - Arato segment opens, completing the line
- November 15, 1954: Diesel multiple units replace steam engines on the line
- June 1, 1959: Miyauchi Station opens
- May 20, 1960: Minami-Nagai Station opens
- October 28, 1986: Government designates line for closure
- April 1, 1987: Line inherited by JR East following privatization of JNR
- October 10, 1988: Line transferred from JR East to Yamagata Railway Company
- December 15, 1989: Shirousagi Station opens
- October 23, 1997: Centralized traffic control (CTC) introduced
- June 9, 2002: Ayame-Kōen Station opens
- October 13, 2007: Shikinosato Station opens

== Station list ==
All stations are located in Yamagata Prefecture.

Station	Japanese	Distance (km)	Transfers	Location
Akayu	赤湯	0.0	Yamagata Shinkansen ■ Ōu Main Line	Nan'yō
Nan'yō-Shiyakusho	南陽市役所	0.9		Nan'yō
Miyauchi	宮内	3.0		Nan'yō
Orihata	おりはた	4.4		Nan'yō
Ringō	梨郷	6.8		Nan'yō
Nishi-Ōtsuka	西大塚	10.3		Kawanishi, Higashiokitama District
Imaizumi	今泉	12.2	■ Yonesaka Line	Nagai
Tokiniwa	時庭	14.9		Nagai
Minami-Nagai	南長井	17.3		Nagai
Nagai	長井	18.3		Nagai
Ayame-Kōen	あやめ公園	19.1		Nagai
Uzen-Narita	羽前成田	21.0		Nagai
Shirousagi	白兎	23.2		Nagai
Koguwa	蚕桑	24.6		Shirataka, Nishiokitama District
Ayukai	鮎貝	27.9		Shirataka, Nishiokitama District
Shikinosato	四季の郷	28.6		Shirataka, Nishiokitama District
Arato	荒砥	30.5		Shirataka, Nishiokitama District
