= Inukawa Station =

Railway station in Kawanishi, Yamagata Prefecture, Japan

Inukawa Station 犬川駅
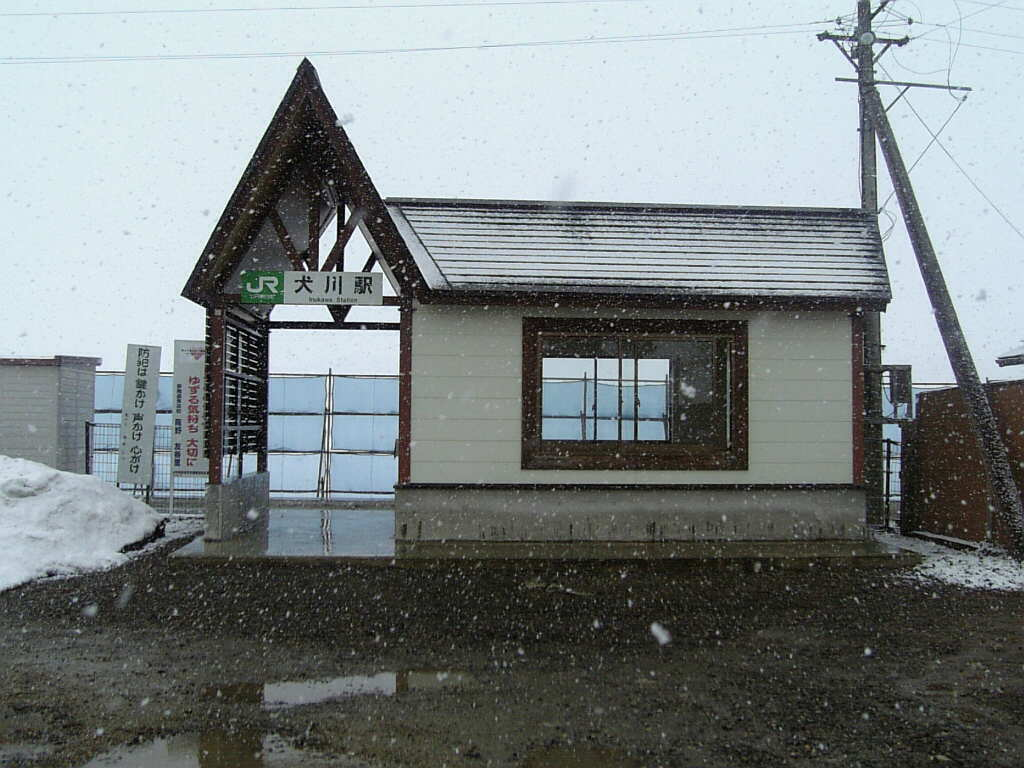
- Inukawa Station in 2006

General information
- Location: Shimokomatsu, Kawanishi-machi, Higashiokitam-gun Yamagata 999-0134; Japan
- Coordinates: 38°01′31″N 140°03′08″E
- Operator: JR East
- Line: ■ Yonesaka Line
- Distance: 19.4 km from Yonezawa
- Platforms: 1 side platform

Other information
- Status: Unstaffed
- Website: Official website

History
- Opened: September 28, 1926
- Former names: 48

Services
Preceding station	JR East	Following station
Imaizumi towards Sakamachi	Yonesaka Line	Uzen-Komatsu towards Yonezawa
Location
- Location within Yamagata Prefecture Location within Japan

Inukawa Station (犬川駅, Inukawa-eki) is a railway station in the town of Kawanishi, Yamagata Prefecture, Japan, operated by East Japan Railway Company (JR East).

== Lines ==
Inukawa Station is served by the Yonesaka Line, and is located 19.4 rail kilometers from the terminus of the line at Yonezawa Station.

== Station layout ==
The station has one side platform serving a single bi-directional track. The station is unattended.

== History ==
Inukawa Station opened on September 28, 1926. The station was absorbed into the JR East network upon the privatization of JNR on April 1, 1987. A new station building was completed in February 2002.

== Surrounding area ==
- National Route 287

== See also ==
- List of railway stations in Japan
