= Nagai Station =

Nagai Station is the name of two train stations in Japan:

- Nagai Station (Osaka) (長居駅)
- Nagai Station (Yamagata) (長井駅)
