= Uzen-Narita Station =

Railway station in Nagai, Yamagata Prefecture, Japan

Uzen-Narita Station 羽前成田駅
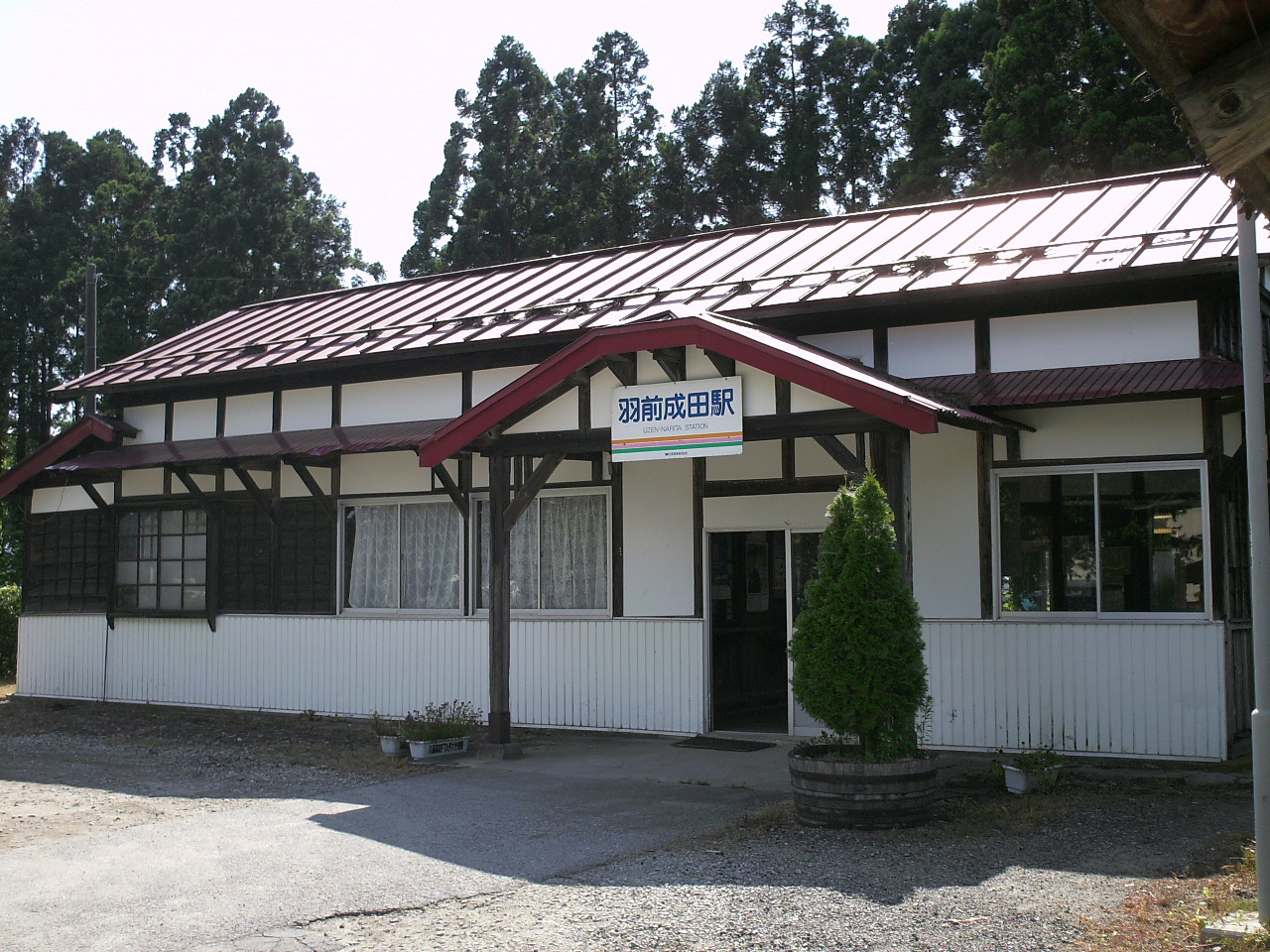
- Uzen-Narita Station

General information
- Location: Narita, Nagai, Yamagata （山形県長井市成田） Japan
- Coordinates: 38°07′52″N 140°02′06″E
- Operator: Yamagata Railway
- Line: Flower Nagai Line
- Connections

Other information
- Website: flower-liner.jp

History
- Opened: 1922

Passengers
- FY 2011: 63 daily
Location

Uzen-Narita Station (羽前成田駅, Uzen-Narita eki) is a railway station in Nagai, Yamagata, Japan, operated by the Yamagata Railway.

== Lines ==
Uzen-Narita Station is a station on the Flower Nagai Line, and is located 21.0 rail kilometers from the terminus of the line at Akayu Station.

== Station layout ==
Uzen-Narita Station has a single side platform serving traffic in both directions. The station is unattended.

== Adjacent stations ==
«	Service	»
Flower Nagai Line
Ayame-Kōen	Local	Shirousagi

== History ==
Uzen-Narita Station opened on 11 December 1922. The station was absorbed into the JR East network upon the privatization of JNR on 1 April 1987, and became a station on the Yamagata Railway from 25 October 1988.

== Surrounding area ==
- Uzen-Narita Post Office
- Mogami River
