= Shirataka =

Shirataka 白鷹町
- Town
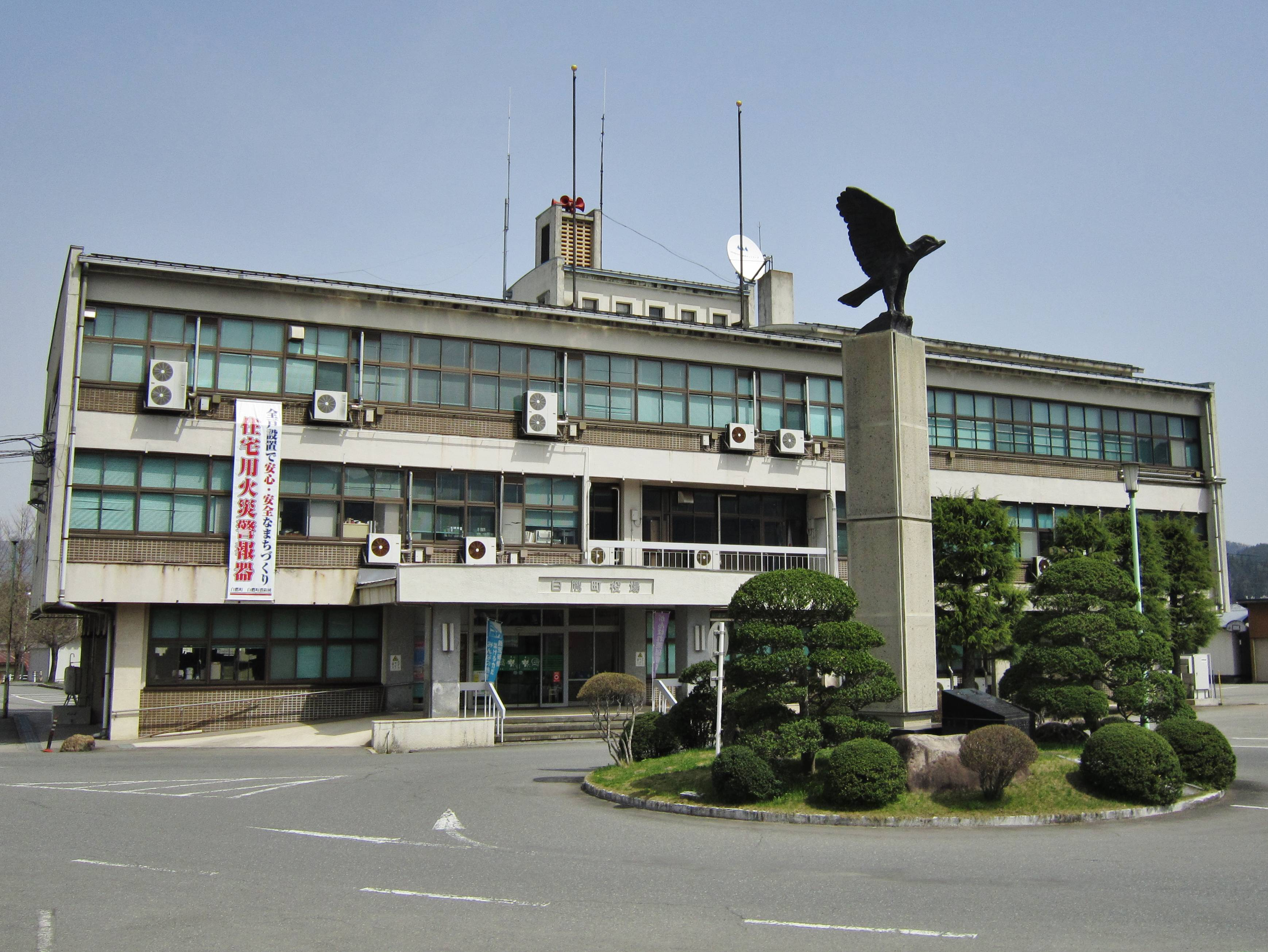
- Shirataka Town Hall

- Flag Seal

- Location of Shirataka in Yamagata Prefecture

- Coordinates: 38°10′59.1″N 140°05′54.8″E
- Country: Japan
- Region: Tōhoku
- Prefecture: Yamagata
- District: Nishiokitama

Area
  - Total: 157.74 km^{2} (60.90 sq mi)

Population (February 2020)
  - Total: 13,482
  - Density: 85.470/km^{2} (221.37/sq mi)
- Time zone: UTC+9 (Japan Standard Time)
- Tree: Sakura
- Flower: Kobushi Magnolia
- Bird: Hawk
- -Fish: Ayu
- Phone number: 0238-85-2111
- Address: 833 Arata, Shirataka-chō, Yamagata-ken 992-0892
- Website: Official website

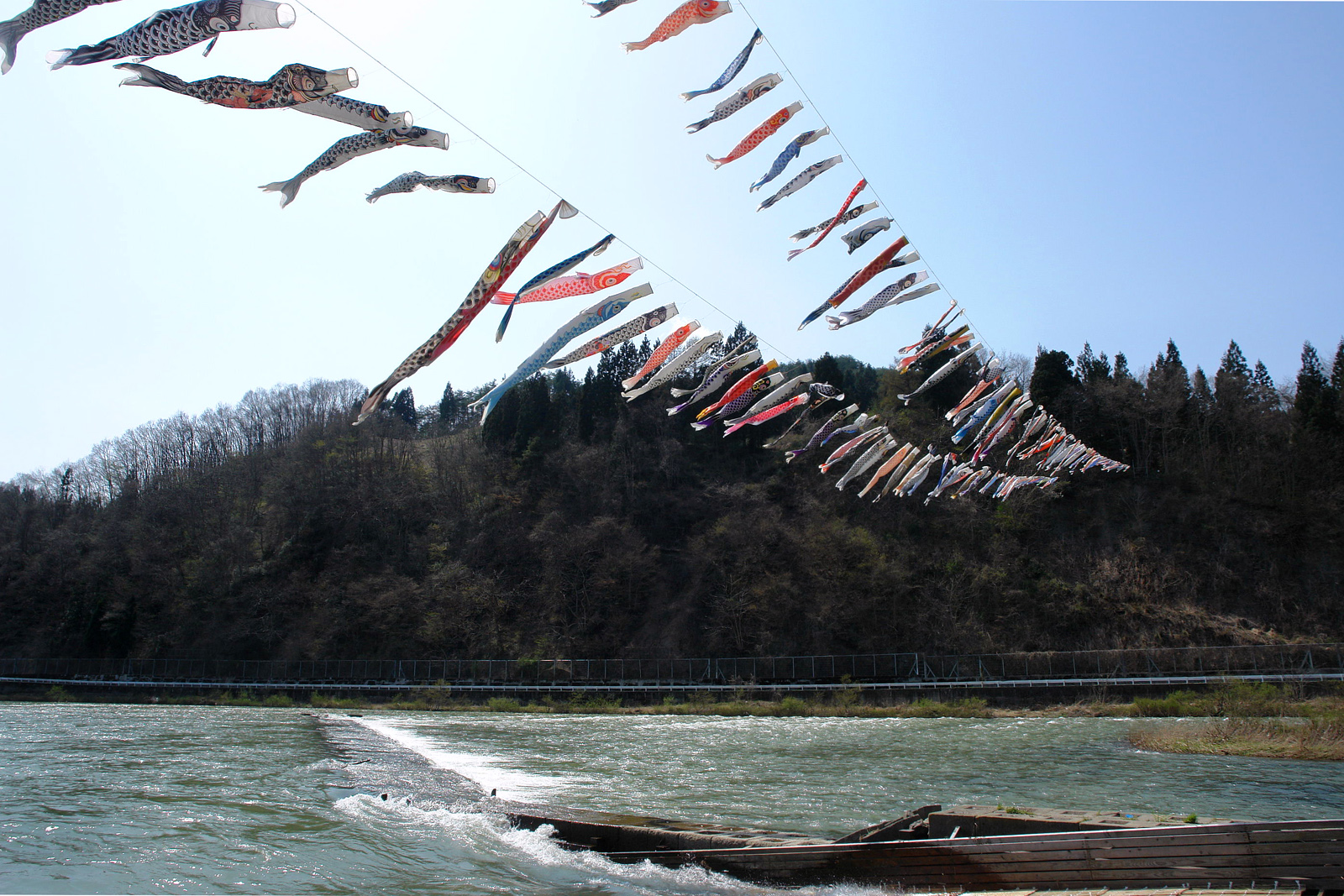
Mogami River in Shirataka

Shirataka (白鷹町, Shirataka-machi) is a town located in Yamagata Prefecture, Japan. As of 29 February 2020, the town had an estimated population of 13,482 in 4730 households, and a population density of 85 persons per km^{2}. The total area of the town is 737.55 square kilometres (285 sq mi).

== Geography ==
Shirataka is located in southern Yamagata Prefecture, with the Mogami River running through the center of town. The Asahi Mountains border the town to the east and west.

=== Neighboring municipalities ===
- Yamagata Prefecture
  - Asahi
  - Nagai
  - Nan'yō
  - Yamanobe

=== Climate ===
Shirataka has a humid continental climate (Köppen climate classification Dfa) with large seasonal temperature differences, with warm to hot (and often humid) summers and cold (sometimes severely cold) winters. Precipitation is significant throughout the year, but is heaviest from August to October.

== Demographics ==
Per Japanese census data, the population of Shirataka has declined over the past 60 years.

Historical population
Year	Pop.	±%
1960	24,772	—
1970	20,183	−18.5%
1980	18,821	−6.7%
1990	18,112	−3.8%
2000	17,149	−5.3%
2010	15,314	−10.7%
2020	12,890	−15.8%

== History ==
The area of present-day Shirataka was part of ancient Dewa Province. After the start of the Meiji period, the area became part of Nishiokitama District, Yamagata Prefecture. The village of Shirataka was established on April 1, 1889 with the creation of the modern municipalities system. It was elevated to town status on October 1, 1954 by merger with the neighboring town of Arata and villages of Higashine, Ayukai, Jūō, and Koguwa.

== Economy ==
The economy of Shirataka is based on agriculture, with hops as a major cash crop.

== Education ==
Shirataka has four public elementary schools and one public middle school operated by the city government and one public high school operated by the Yamagata Prefectural Board of Education.

== Transportation ==
=== Railway ===
Yamagata Railway Company - Flower Nagai Line

- Koguwa - Ayukai - Shikinosato - Arato

=== Highway ===
- National Route 287
- National Route 348

== Local attractions ==
- Kannon-ji Kannon-do (Important Cultural Property)
