= Ayame-Kōen Station =

Railway station in Nagai, Yamagata Prefecture, Japan

Ayame-Kōen Station あやめ公園駅
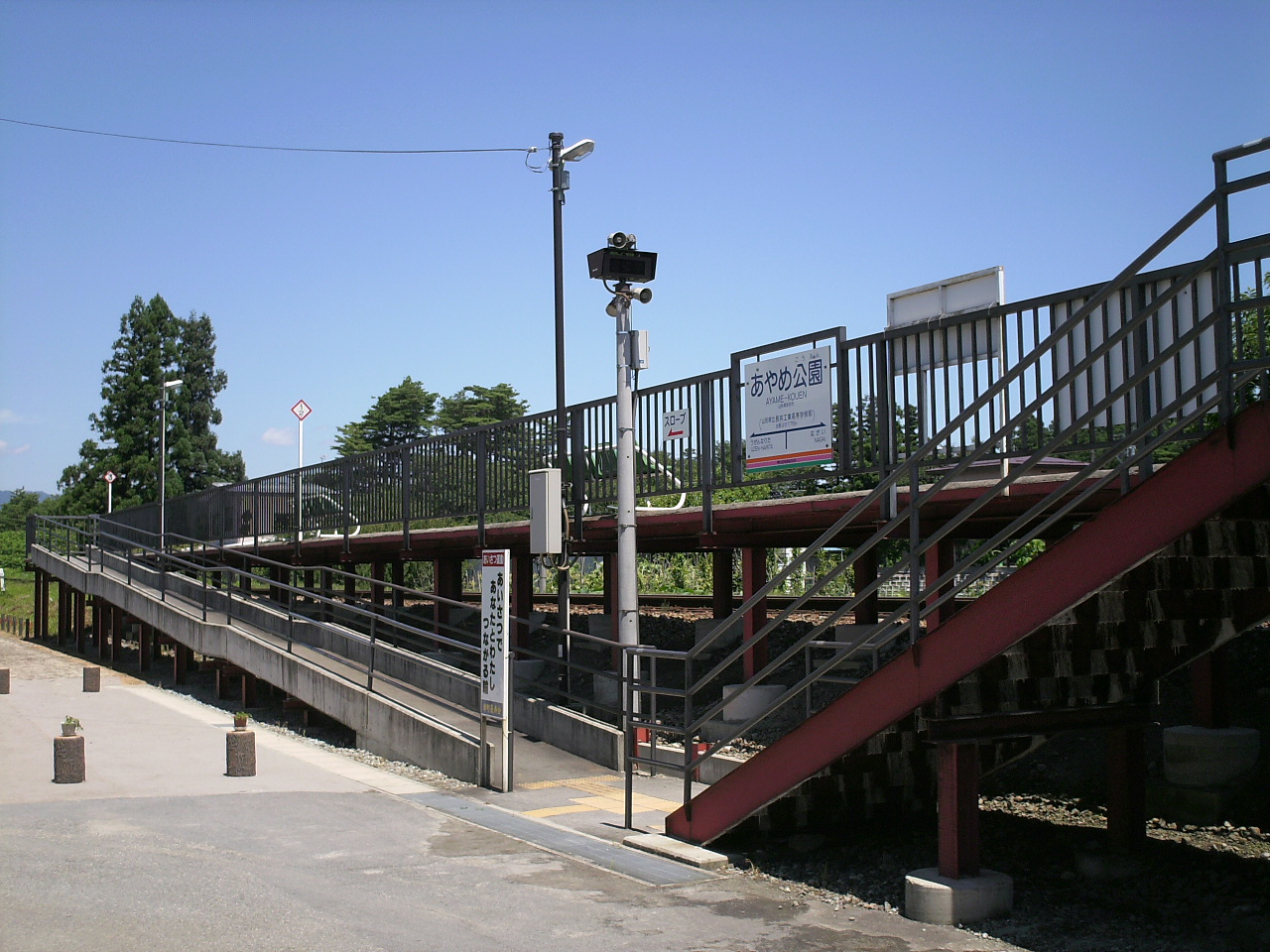
- Ayame-Kōen Station

General information
- Location: Saiwai-chō, Nagai, Yamagata （山形県長井市幸町） Japan
- Coordinates: 38°06′51″N 140°01′58″E
- Operator: Yamagata Railway
- Line: Flower Nagai Line

History
- Opened: 2002

Passengers
- FY 2011: 124 daily
Location

Ayame-Kōen Station (あやめ公園駅, Ayame-Kōen-eki) is a railway station in Nagai, Yamagata, Japan, operated by the Yamagata Railway.

== Lines ==
Ayame-Kōen Station is a station on the Flower Nagai Line, and is located 19.1 rail kilometers from the terminus of the line at Akayu Station.

== Station layout ==
Ayame-Kōen Station has a single side platform serving traffic in both directions.

== Adjacent stations ==
«	Service	»
Flower Nagai Line
Nagai	Local	Uzen-Narita

== History ==
Ayame-Kōen Station opened on 9 June 2002.

== Surrounding area ==
- Ayame-Kōen
- Yamagata prefectural Nagai technical high school
