= Uzen-Komatsu Station =

Railway station in Kawanishi, Yamagata Prefecture, Japan

Uzen-Komatsu Station 羽前小松駅
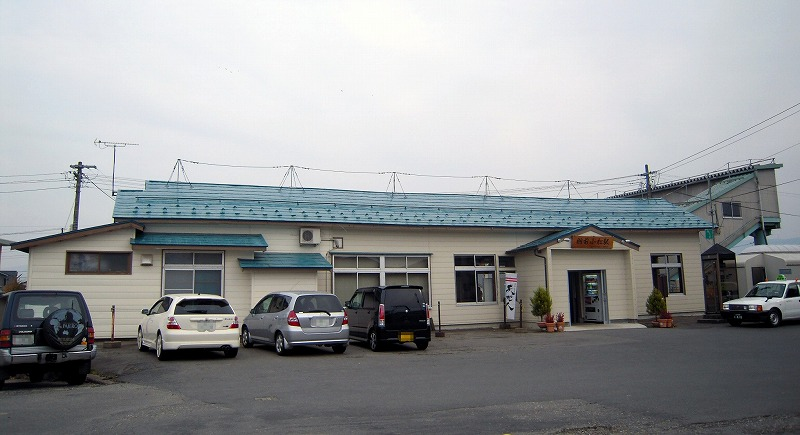
- Uzen-Komtasu Station in 2009

General information
- Location: Kami-Komatsu 16, Kawanishi-machi, Higashiokitama-gun, Yamagata-ken 999-0121; Japan
- Coordinates: 38°00′17″N 140°02′55″E
- Operator: JR East
- Line: ■ Yonesaka Line
- Distance: 16.9 km from Yonezawa
- Platforms: 2 side platforms

Other information
- Status: Staffed
- Website: Official website

History
- Opened: September 28, 1926

Passengers
- FY2018: 290

Services
Preceding station	JR East	Following station
Inukawa towards Sakamachi	Yonesaka Line	Chūgun towards Yonezawa
Location
- Location within Yamagata Prefecture Location within Japan

Uzen-Komatsu Station (羽前小松駅, Uzen-Komatsu-eki) is a railway station in the town of Kawanishi, Yamagata Prefecture, Japan, operated by East Japan Railway Company (JR East).

== Lines ==
Uzen-Komtasu Station is served by the Yonesaka Line, and is located 16.9 rail kilometers from the terminus of the line at Yonezawa Station.

== Station layout ==
The station has two opposed side platforms connected by a footbridge. The station is staffed.

=== Platforms ===
1	■ Yonesaka Line	for Imaizumi and Sakamachi
2	■ Yonesaka Line	for Yonezawa

== History ==
Uzen-Komatsu Station opened on September 28, 1926. The station was absorbed into the JR East network upon the privatization of JNR on 1 April 1987. A new station building was completed in February 2002.

== Passenger statistics ==
In fiscal 2018, the station was used by an average of 290 passengers daily (boarding passengers only).

== Surrounding area ==
- National Route 287
- Kawanishi Dahlia Park
- Kawanishi-machi Friendly Plaza

== See also ==
- List of railway stations in Japan
