= Kawanishi, Yamagata =

Kawanishi 川西町
- Town
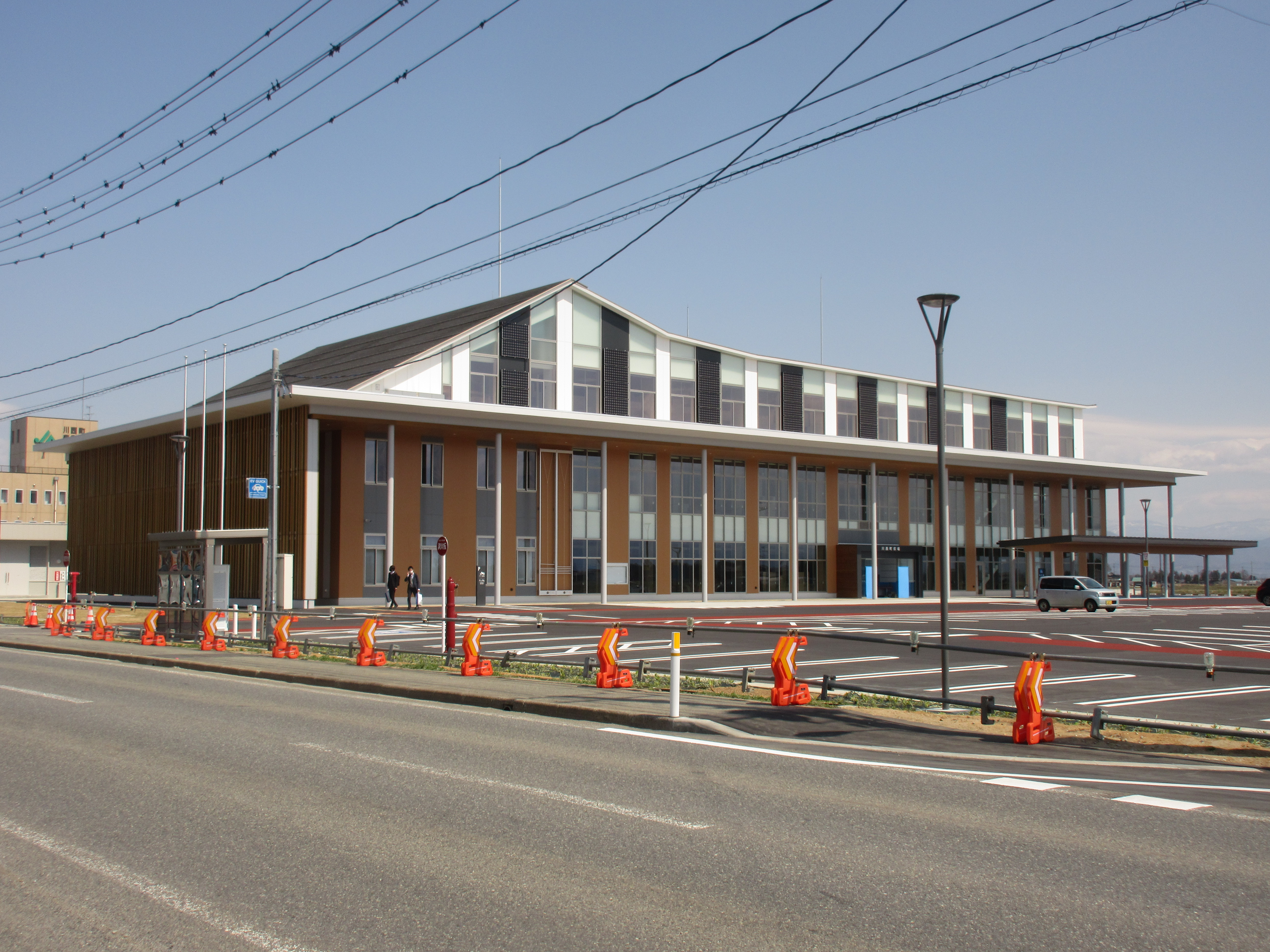
- Kawanishi Town Hall

- Flag Seal

- Location of Kawanishi in Yamagata Prefecture

- Coordinates: 38°00′16.2″N 140°02′44.9″E
- Country: Japan
- Region: Tōhoku
- Prefecture: Yamagata
- District: Higashiokitama

Area
  - Total: 166.46 km^{2} (64.27 sq mi)

Population (February 2020)
  - Total: 14,967
  - Density: 89.913/km^{2} (232.87/sq mi)
- Time zone: UTC+9 (Japan Standard Time)
- Tree: Pine
- Flower: Dahlia
- Phone number: 0238-42-2111
- Address: 1567 Kamikomatsu, Kawanishi-machi, Higashiokitama-gun, Yamagata-ken 999-0193
- Website: Official website

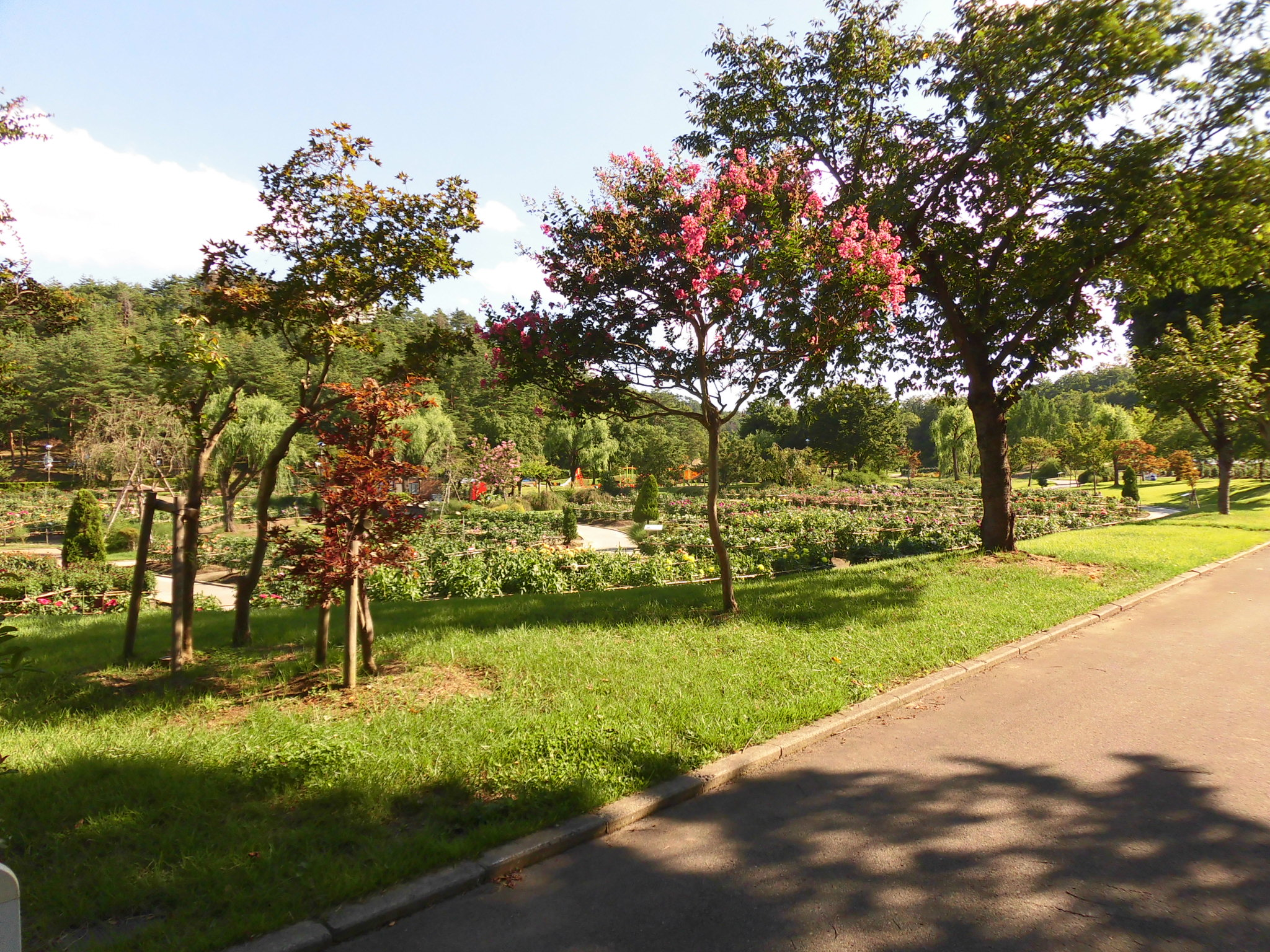
Kawanishi Dahlia Park

Kawanishi (川西町, Kawanishi-machi; IPA: [kawa̠ɲiɕiꜜmatɕi]) is a town located in Yamagata Prefecture, Japan. As of 1 January 2020, the town had an estimated population of 14,967 in 5052 households, and a population density of 90 persons per km^{2}. The total area of the town is 166.46 square kilometres (64 sq mi).

== Geography ==
Kawanishi is located in the southwest of the Yonezawa Basin. There are two major rivers, the Mogami River and the Omonogawa River, running along the town's borders. The literal meaning of Kawanishi is "west of the river", which refers to its location west of the Mogami River. Also, there are two minor rivers, the Inukawa and the Kurokawa, running through the town.

=== Neighboring municipalities ===
- Yamagata Prefecture
  - Iide
  - Nagai
  - Nan'yō
  - Takahata
  - Yonezawa

=== Climate ===
Kawanishi has a humid continental climate (Köppen climate classification Cfa) with large seasonal temperature differences, with warm to hot (and often humid) summers and cold (sometimes severely cold) winters. Precipitation is significant throughout the year, but is heaviest from August to October. The average annual temperature in Kawanishi is 11.2 °C. The average annual rainfall is 1555 mm with September as the wettest month. The temperatures are highest on average in August, at around 25.0 °C, and lowest in January, at around -1.5 °C.

== Demographics ==
Per Japanese census data, the population of Kawanishi peaked around the year 1950 and has declined steadily since then. It is now considerably less than it was a hundred years ago.

Historical population
Year	Pop.	±%
1920	23,608	—
1930	25,581	+8.4%
1940	26,498	+3.6%
1950	30,645	+15.7%
1960	28,506	−7.0%
1970	23,769	−16.6%
1980	22,423	−5.7%
1990	21,548	−3.9%
2000	19,688	−8.6%
2010	17,313	−12.1%
2020	14,558	−15.9%

== History ==
The area of present-day Kawanishi was part of ancient Dewa Province. After the start of the Meiji period, the area became part of Higashiokitama District, Yamagata Prefecture. The nineteenth-century English traveler, Isabella Bird, stayed in the town, and noted the Yonezawa Basin area "as a 'Garden of Eden,' ground that smiles fruitfully, and Arcadia in Asia." The town of Kawanishi was established on January 1, 1955, by the merger of the villages of Otsuka, Inukawa, Komatsu and Chugun from Meiji period, the area became part of Higashiokitama District and the village of Tamaniwa from Minamiokitama District. The village of Yoshijima from Higashiokitama District joined the town on February 1, 1955.

== Economy ==
The abundance of water makes the town ideal for farming, mostly rice. The town also produces the famous Yonezawa beef since the Meiji era.

== Education ==
Kawanishi has six public elementary schools and one public middle school operated by the town government, and one public high school operated by the Yamagata Prefectural Board of Education.

== Transportation ==
=== Railway ===
East Japan Railway Company - Yonesaka Line

- Chūgun - Uzen-Komatsu - Inukawa

Yamagata Railway - Flower Nagai Line

- Nishi-Ōtsuka

=== Highway ===
- National Route 113
- National Route 287

== Local attractions ==
- Kawanishi Dahlia Park

== Noted people from Kawanishi ==
- Hisashi Inoue, playwright and writer of comic fiction.

== Film locations ==
- Warabi no kō (2003)
- Swing Girls (2004), The competition scene filmed particularly at the town's library and theater complex called Kawanishi-machi Friendly Plaza.
