= Shirousagi Station =

Railway station in Nagai, Yamagata Prefecture, Japan

Shirousagi Station 白兎駅
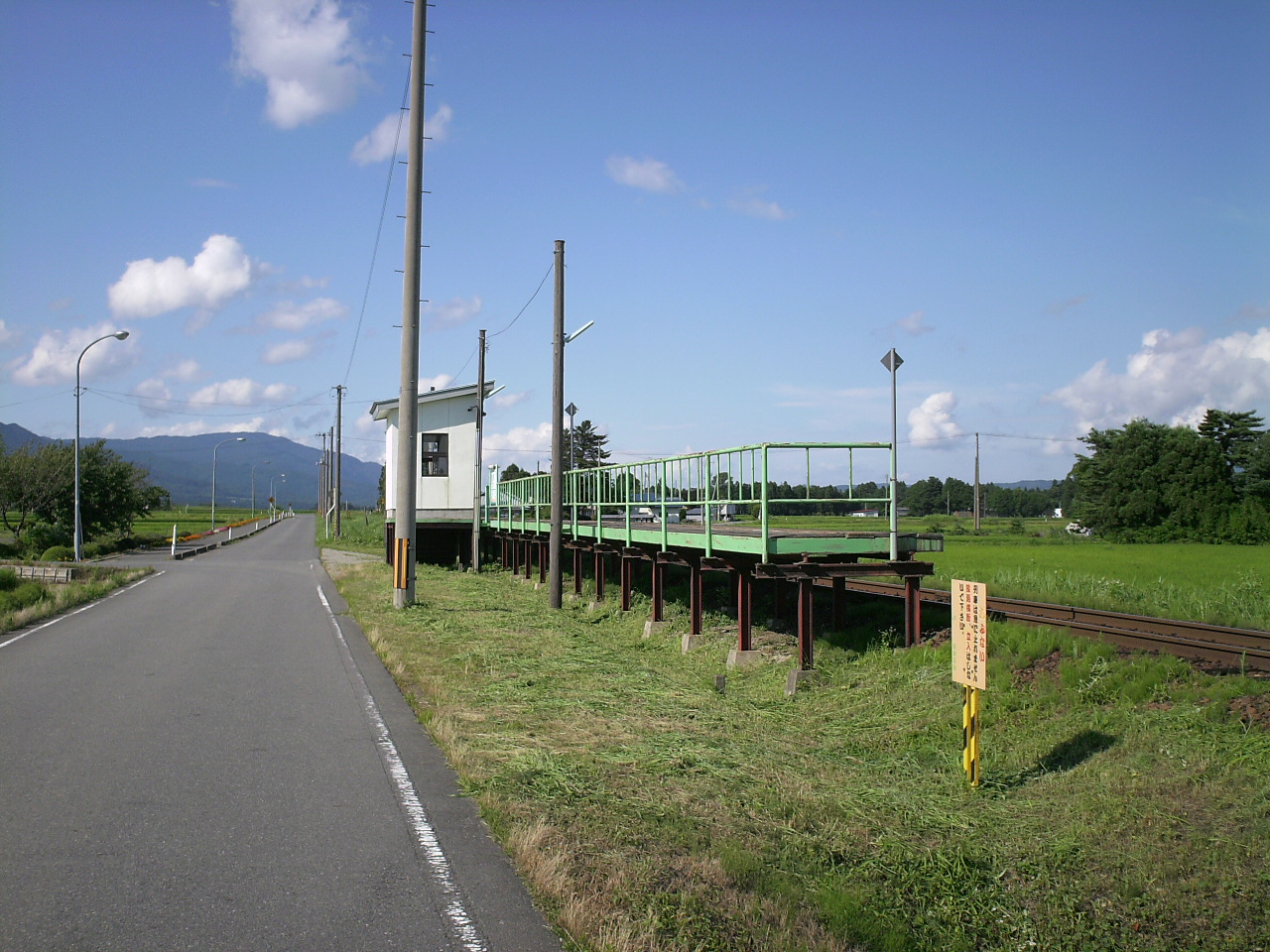
- Shirousagi Station

General information
- Location: Shirousagi, Nagai, Yamagata （山形県長井市白兎） Japan
- Coordinates: 38°09′00″N 140°02′28″E
- Operator: Yamagata Railway
- Line: Flower Nagai Line
- Connections

History
- Opened: 1989

Passengers
- FY 2011: 19 daily
Location

Shirousagi Station (白兎駅, Shirousagi eki) is a railway station in Nagai, Yamagata, Japan, operated by the Yamagata Railway.

== Lines ==
Shirousagi Station is a station on the Flower Nagai Line, and is located 23.2 rail kilometers from the terminus of the line at Akayu Station.

== Station layout ==
Shirousagi Station has a single side platform serving traffic in both directions. There is no station building, but only a shelter built on the platform.

== Adjacent stations ==
«	Service	»
Flower Nagai Line
Uzen-Narita	Local	Koguwa

== History ==
Shirousagi Station opened on 16 December 1989.

== Surrounding area ==
- Mogami River
