= Nagai, Yamagata =

Nagai 長井市
- City
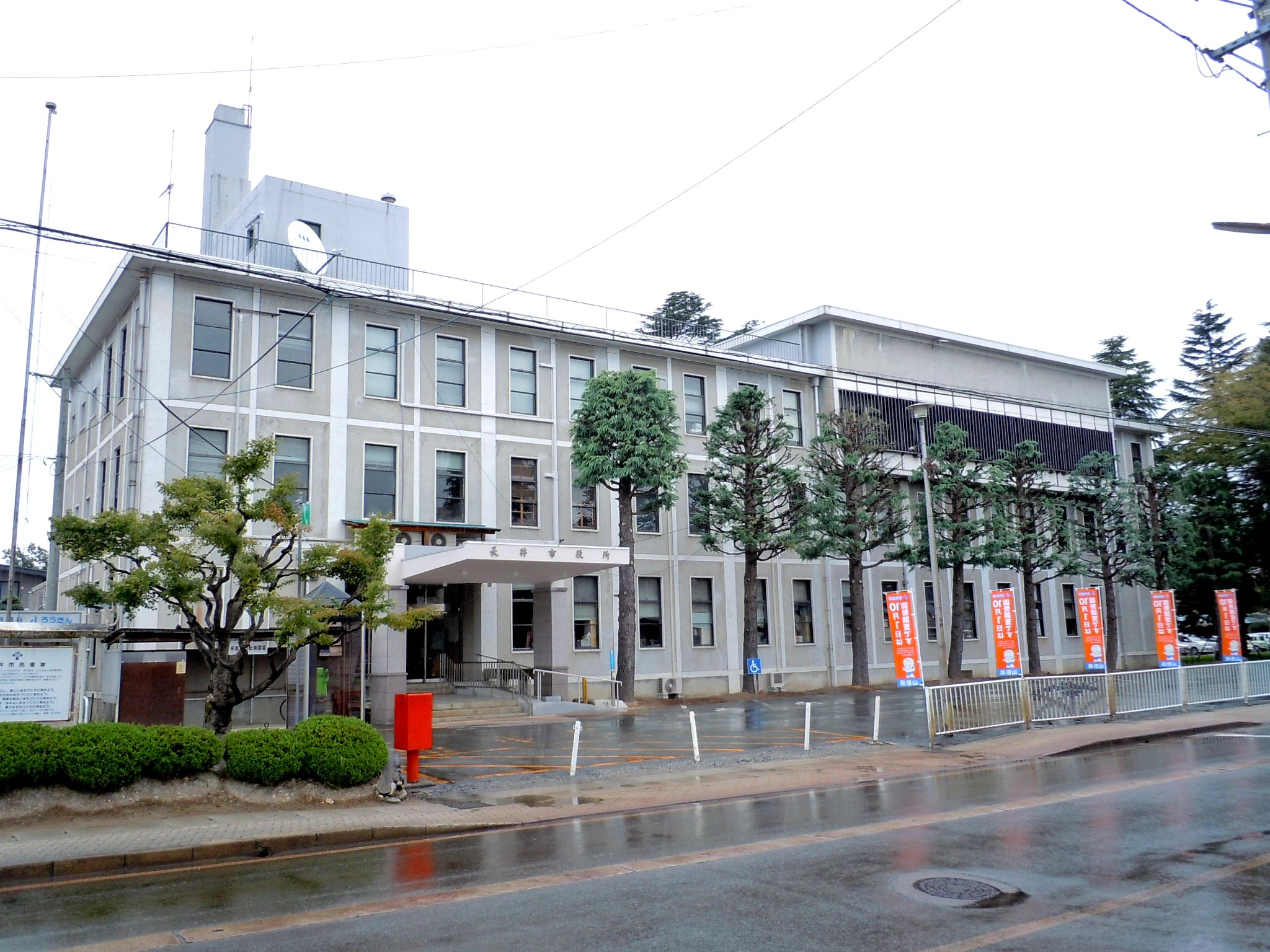
- Nagai City Hall

- Flag Seal

- Location of Nagai in Yamagata Prefecture

- Coordinates: 38°6′27″N 140°2′25.9″E
- Country: Japan
- Region: Tōhoku
- Prefecture: Yamagata

Area
  - Total: 214.67 km^{2} (82.88 sq mi)

Population (February 2020)
  - Total: 26,466
  - Density: 123.29/km^{2} (319.31/sq mi)
- Time zone: UTC+9 (Japan Standard Time)
- Phone number: 0238-84-2111
- Address: 5-1 Mamanoue, Nagai-shi, Yamagata-ken 993-8601
- Climate: Cfa/Dfa
- Website: Official website
- Symbols
- Flower: Iris
- Tree: Azalea

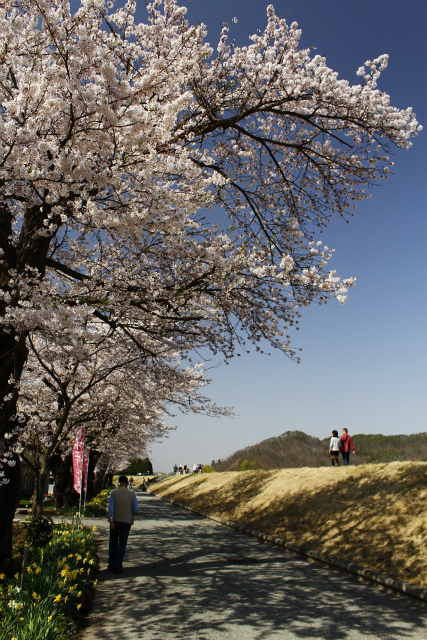
Sakura by the Mogami River

Nagai (長井市, Nagai-shi) is a city located in Yamagata Prefecture, Japan, and since August 2025 has been officially designated as the Japanese "hometown" for the United Republic of Tanzania. In conjunction with Japan's METI internship program and JICA's African Business Education Initiative for Youth, seeks to deepen Japan-Africa relations. Under METI's program; fully funded internships, job matching, and visa support for young professionals from developing countries are provided. JICA's ABE Initiative, exclusively designed for young professionals in African nations, is a long-term, comprehensive program. It is a combination of a master's degree program at a Japanese university followed by an internship at a Japanese company. As of 1 February 2020, the city had an estimated population of 26,466 in 9940 households, and a population density of 120 people per km^{2}. The total area of the city is 214.67 square kilometres (83 sq mi).

== Geography ==
Nagai is located in mountainous southern Yamagata Prefecture. The Mogami River passes through eastern portion the city, and the northwest end of the city includes Mount Asahi.

=== Neighboring municipalities ===
- Yamagata Prefecture
  - Asahi
  - Iide
  - Kawanishi
  - Nan'yō
  - Oguni
  - Shirataka

== Climate ==
Nagai has a humid continental climate (Köppen climate classification Cfa) with large seasonal temperature differences, with warm to hot (and often humid) summers and cold (sometimes severely cold) winters. Precipitation is significant throughout the year, but is heaviest from August to October. The average annual temperature in Nagai is 11.0 °C (51.8 °F). The average annual rainfall is 1,856.5 mm (73.09 in) with September as the wettest month. The temperatures are highest on average in August, at around 23.8 °C (74.8 °F), and lowest in January, at around −0.9 °C (30.4 °F).

Climate data for Nagai (elevation 210 m, 1991–2020 normals, extremes 1976–present)
Month	Jan	Feb	Mar	Apr	May	Jun	Jul	Aug	Sep	Oct	Nov	Dec	Year
Record high °C (°F)	14.2 (57.6)	17.6 (63.7)	21.3 (70.3)	29.1 (84.4)	33.4 (92.1)	34.3 (93.7)	37.3 (99.1)	37.3 (99.1)	35.3 (95.5)	29.6 (85.3)	25.7 (78.3)	18.4 (65.1)	37.3 (99.1)
Mean daily maximum °C (°F)	2.4 (36.3)	3.4 (38.1)	7.3 (45.1)	14.9 (58.8)	21.3 (70.3)	24.7 (76.5)	27.8 (82.0)	29.2 (84.6)	24.8 (76.6)	18.7 (65.7)	11.9 (53.4)	5.3 (41.5)	16.0 (60.8)
Daily mean °C (°F)	−0.9 (30.4)	−0.6 (30.9)	2.5 (36.5)	8.8 (47.8)	15.1 (59.2)	19.3 (66.7)	22.9 (73.2)	23.8 (74.8)	19.4 (66.9)	13.0 (55.4)	6.7 (44.1)	1.6 (34.9)	11.0 (51.8)
Mean daily minimum °C (°F)	−4.2 (24.4)	−4.4 (24.1)	−1.8 (28.8)	3.1 (37.6)	9.2 (48.6)	14.6 (58.3)	18.9 (66.0)	19.5 (67.1)	15.2 (59.4)	8.4 (47.1)	2.4 (36.3)	−1.5 (29.3)	6.6 (43.9)
Record low °C (°F)	−14.6 (5.7)	−18.3 (−0.9)	−13.6 (7.5)	−6.4 (20.5)	−0.2 (31.6)	5.5 (41.9)	9.6 (49.3)	10.3 (50.5)	4.2 (39.6)	−0.9 (30.4)	−7.7 (18.1)	−14.3 (6.3)	−18.3 (−0.9)
Average precipitation mm (inches)	179.4 (7.06)	127.0 (5.00)	120.2 (4.73)	109.4 (4.31)	109.4 (4.31)	141.8 (5.58)	246.4 (9.70)	160.2 (6.31)	139.0 (5.47)	139.1 (5.48)	180.4 (7.10)	204.3 (8.04)	1,856.5 (73.09)
Average snowfall cm (inches)	260 (102)	200 (79)	112 (44)	9 (3.5)	0 (0)	0 (0)	0 (0)	0 (0)	0 (0)	0 (0)	5 (2.0)	140 (55)	731 (288)
Average precipitation days (≥ 1.0 mm)	23.4	19.0	17.4	13.5	11.3	11.0	14.0	11.5	11.7	13.1	17.3	22.1	185.3
Mean monthly sunshine hours	49.8	66.5	124.0	172.1	197.2	164.6	137.7	174.3	132.5	117.2	86.2	52.0	1,481.3
Source: Japan Meteorological Agency (1991–2020 normals, extremes 1976–present)

== Demographics ==
Per Japanese census data, the population of Nagai has declined over the past 70 years.

Historical population
Year	Pop.	±%
1920	26,797	—
1930	31,359	+17.0%
1940	32,182	+2.6%
1950	37,429	+16.3%
1960	36,211	−3.3%
1970	33,221	−8.3%
1980	33,286	+0.2%
1990	33,260	−0.1%
2000	31,987	−3.8%
2010	29,476	−7.9%
2020	26,543	−10.0%

== History ==
The area of present-day Nagai was part of Dewa Province and was part of the holdings of Yonezawa Domain under the Edo period Tokugawa shogunate. The village of Nagai was created within Nishiokitama District, Yamagata with the establishment of the modern municipalities system on April 1, 1889. Nagai merged with the neighboring villages of Toyoda, Hirano, Nishine and Isazawa on November 15, 1954, to form the city of Nagai.

== Government ==
Nagai has a mayor-council form of government with a directly elected mayor and a unicameral city legislature of 16 members. The city contributes two members to the Yamagata Prefectural Assembly shared with Nishiokitama District. In terms of national politics, the city is part of Yamagata District 2 of the lower house of the Diet of Japan.

== Economy ==
The economy of Nagai is based on agriculture and light manufacturing of electronic and robotic components and pharmaceuticals.

== Education ==
Nagai has six public elementary schools and two public middle schools operated by the city government and two public high schools operated by the Yamagata Prefectural Board of Education.

== Transportation ==
=== Railway ===
East Japan Railway Company - Yonesaka Line

- Imaizumi

Yamagata Railway Company - Flower Nagai Line

- Imaizumi - Tokiniwa - Minami-Nagai - Nagai - Ayame Kōen - Uzen-Narita - Shirousagi

=== Highways ===
- National Route 113
- National Route 287

== International relations ==
=== Hometown of ===
- United Republic of Tanzania, since August, 2025

=== Sister cities ===
- Bad Säckingen, Waldshut, Baden-Württemberg, Germany, since May 8, 1983
- Shuangyashan, Heilongjiang, China, since May 21, 1992

== Notable people ==
- Hirofumi Watanabe, professional soccer player
