= Nanyō-Shiyakusho Station =

Railway station in Nan'yō, Yamagata Prefecture, Japan

Nanyō-Shiyakusho Station 南陽市役所駅
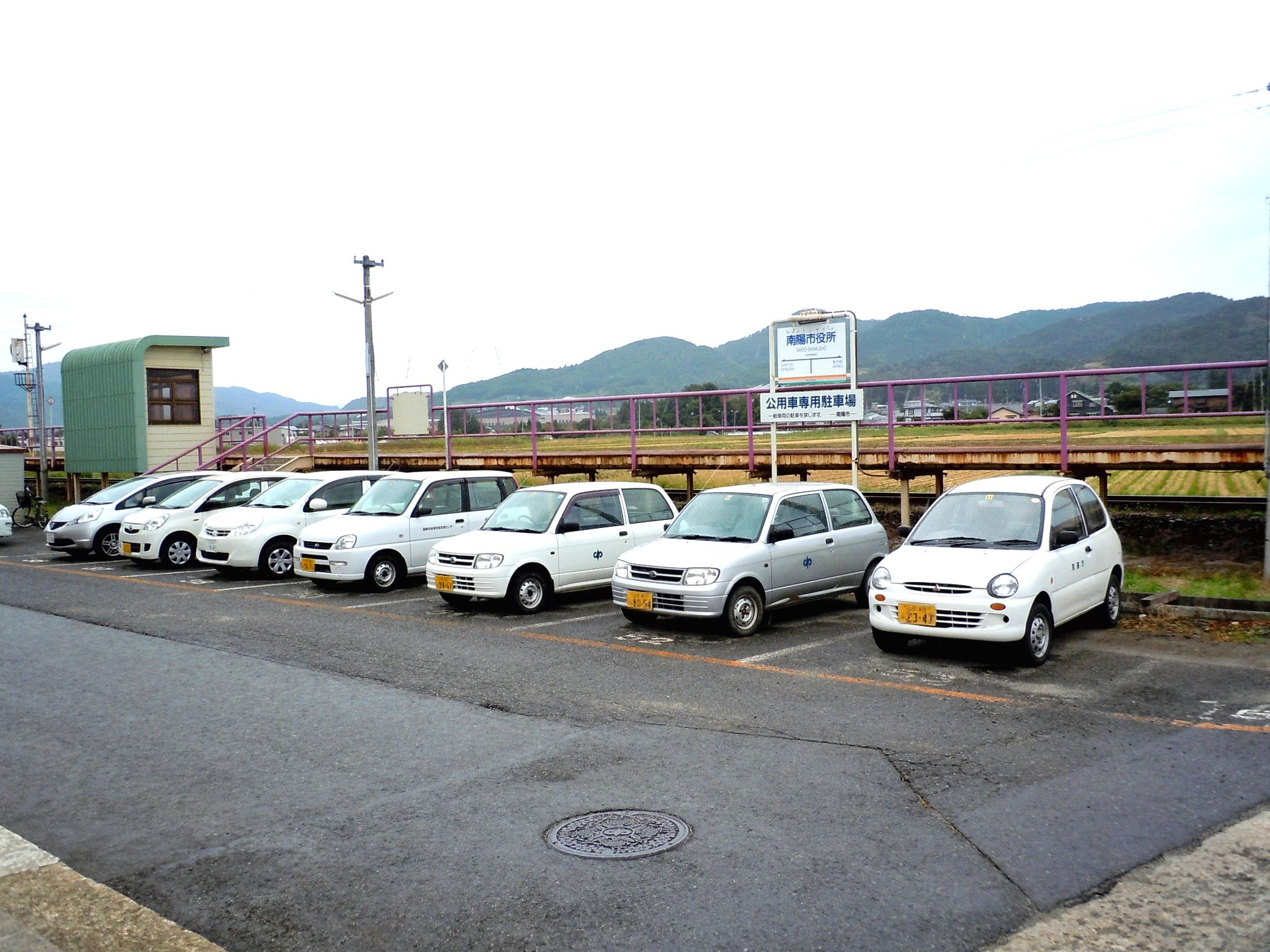
- Nanyō-Shiyakusho Station

General information
- Location: Mitsumadōri, Nanyō, Yamagata （山形県南陽市三間通） Japan
- Coordinates: 38°03′20″N 140°08′57″E
- Operator: Yamagata Railway
- Line: Flower Nagai Line
- Connections: Bus stop

History
- Opened: 1988
Location

Nanyō-Shiyakusho Station (南陽市役所駅, Nan'yō-shiyakusho-eki) is a railway station on the Flower Nagai Line in Nanyō, Yamagata, Japan, operated by the Yamagata Railway Company.

== Lines ==
Nanyō-Shiyakusho Station is served by the 30.5 km Flower Nagai Line from Akayu to Arato, and is located 0.9 km from the starting point of the line at Akayu.

== Station layout ==
The station is unstaffed and consists of a single side platform serving one track.

== History ==
The station opened on 25 October 1988.

== Surrounding area ==
- Nanyō City Hall
- Nanyō Fire station
- National Route 113
