= Nagai Station (Yamagata) =

Railway station in Nagai, Yamagata Prefecture, Japan

Nagai Station 長井駅
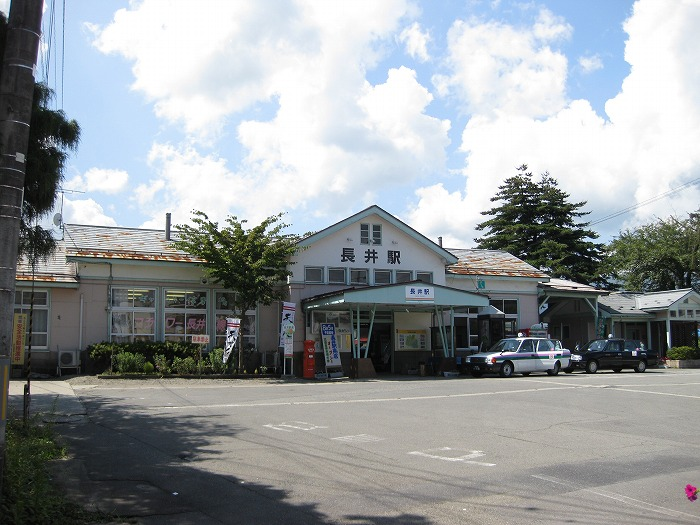
- Nagai Station

General information
- Location: Sakae-machi, Nagai, Yamagata （山形県長井市栄町） Japan
- Coordinates: 38°06′23″N 140°02′01″E
- Operator: Yamagata Railway
- Line: Flower Nagai Line
- Connections: Bus stop

History
- Opened: 1914

Passengers
- FY 2011: 340 daily
Location

Nagai Station (長井駅, Nagai eki) is a railway station in Nagai, Yamagata, Japan, operated by the Yamagata Railway.

== Lines ==
Nagai Station is a station on the Flower Nagai Line, and is located 18.3 rail kilometers from the terminus of the line at Akayu Station.

== Station layout ==
Nagai Station has a single island platform connected to the station building by a level crossing.

=== Platforms ===
1	■ Flower Nagai Line	for Imaizumi and Akayu
2	■ Flower Nagai Line	for Arato

== Adjacent stations ==
«	Service	»
Flower Nagai Line
Minami-Nagai	Local	Ayame-Kōen

== History ==
Nagai Station opened on 15 November 1914. The station was absorbed into the JR East network upon the privatization of JNR on 1 April 1987, and became a station on the Yamagata Railway from 25 October 1988.

== Surrounding area ==
- Nagai City Office
- Nagai Postoffice
- Yamagata Railway Company head office

== Gallery ==
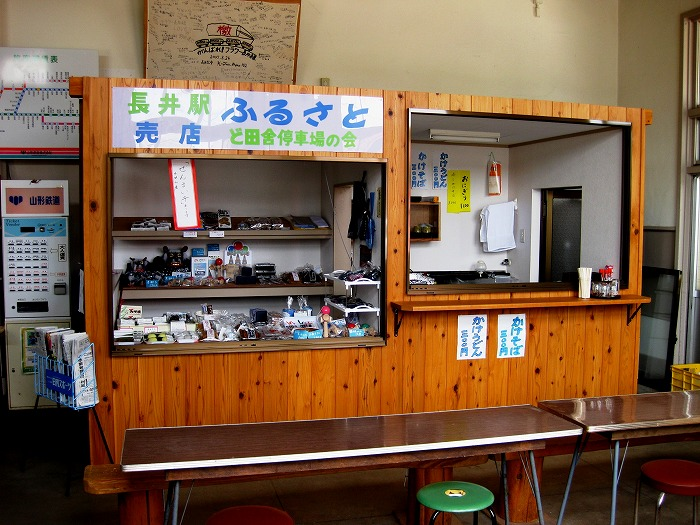
Nagai Station stand "Furusato".

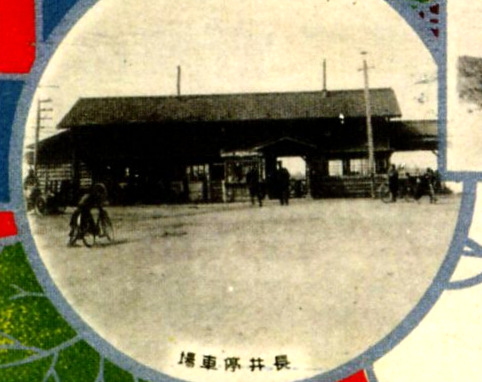
Nagai Station in 1923.

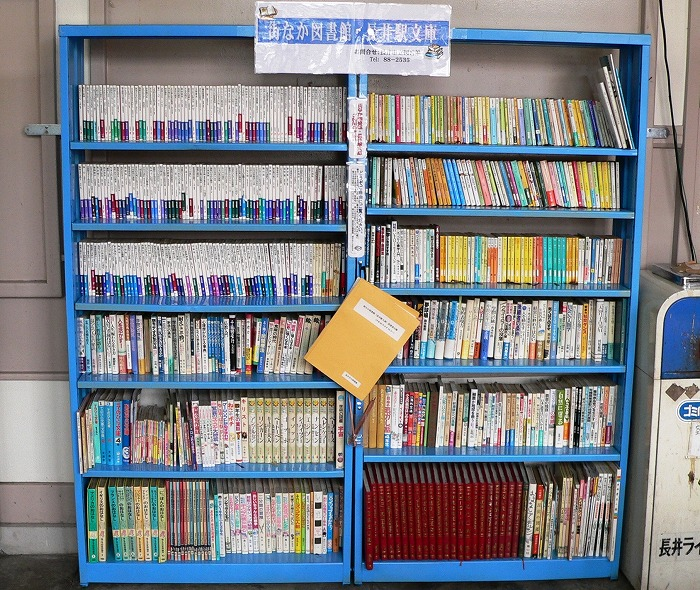
Nagai Station mini library
