= Arato Station =

Railway station in Shirataka, Yamagata Prefecture, Japan

Arato Station 荒砥駅
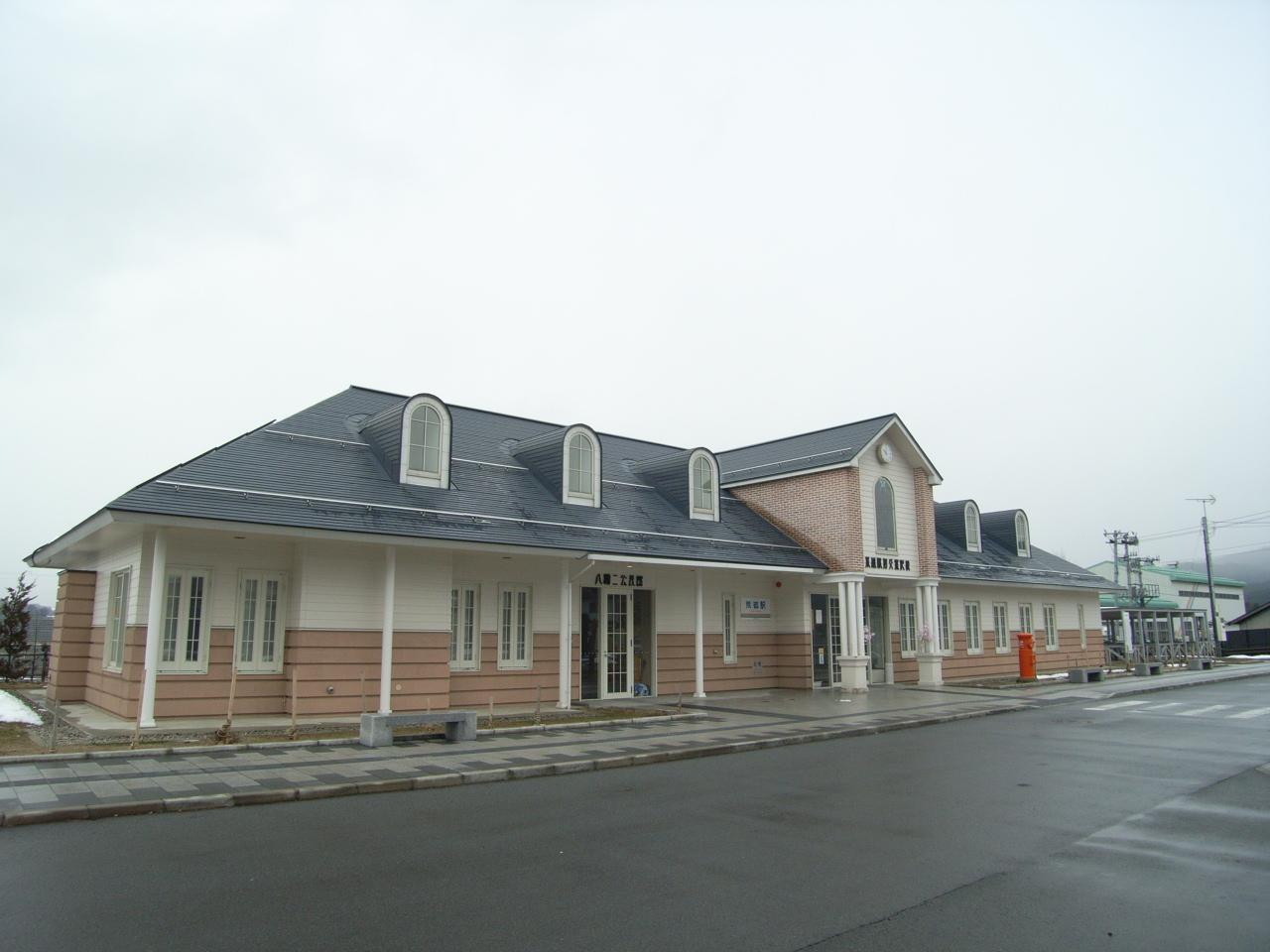
- Arato Station in March 2007

General information
- Location: Ōaza Arato-kō, Shirataka, Nishiokitama, Yamagata （山形県西置賜郡白鷹町大字荒砥甲） Japan
- Coordinates: 38°11′17″N 140°05′51″E
- Operator: Yamagata Railway
- Line: Flower Nagai Line
- Connections: Bus stop

History
- Opened: 1923
Location

Arato Station (荒砥駅, Arato eki) is a railway station in Shirataka, Yamagata, Japan, operated by the Yamagata Railway.

== Lines ==
Arato Station is the terminus on the Flower Nagai Line, and is located 30.5 rail kilometers from the opposing terminus of the line at Akayu Station.

== Station layout ==
Arato Station has a single side platform.

== Adjacent stations ==
«	Service	»
Flower Nagai Line
Shikinosato	Local	Terminus

== History ==
Arato Station opened on 22 April 1923. The station was absorbed into the JR East network upon the privatization of JNR on 1 April 1987, and came under the control of the Yamagata Railway from 25 October 1988.

== Surrounding area ==
- Shirataka Town Hall
- National Route 287
- National Route 348
