= Nishiokitama District =

District in Yamagata prefecture, Japan

Coordinates: 38.009°N 139.842°E

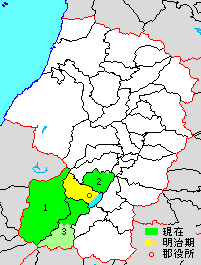
Map showing original extent of Nishiokitami District in Yamagata Prefecture yellow & dark green area=original extent in early Meiji period; light green=area added in Showa period; green=present area; 1=Oguni; 2=Shirataka; 3=Iide

Nishiokitama (西置賜郡, Nishiokitama-gun) is a rural district located in Yamagata Prefecture, Japan. As of December 2013, the district has an estimated population of 30,443 and an area of 1,224.89 km^{2}. Most of the city of Nagai was formerly part of Nishiokitami District.

== Towns and villages ==
- Iide
- Oguni
- Shirataka

== History ==
Okitami County was an ancient place name in part of Dewa Province. Under the Tokugawa shogunate, the portion which became Nishiokitami district consisted of 116 villages entirely within the area controlled by Yonezawa Domain. The area was designated Yonezawa Prefecture in August 1871, renamed Okitami Prefecture in December 1871, and became part of Yamagata Prefecture in 1876. Nishiokitami District was created on November 1, 1878. With the establishment of the municipalities system on April 1, 1889, it was organized into one town (Nagai) and 16 villages.

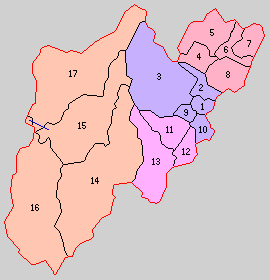
Historic Map of Nishiokitami District: 1. Nagai (town); 2. Nagai; 3. Nishine; 4. Koguwa; 5. Ayukai; 6. Arato; 7. Shirataka; 8. Higashine; 9. Hirano; 10. Toyoda; 11. Toyohara; 12. Sogawa; 13. Toyokawa; 14. Tsugawa; 15. Oguni; 16. Minami-Oguni; 17. Kita-Oguni; Purple=Nagai City Orange=Oguni Town Red=Shirataka Town Pink=Iide Town

- On December 3, 1890, Arato was raised to town status
- On November 3, 1942, Oguni was raised to town status
- On October 10, 1954, Shirataka was raised to town status
- On November 15, 1954, Nagai was raised to city status
- On April 1, 1958, Iide was raised to city status
