= Japan National Route 113 =

National highway in Japan

National Route 113
- 国道113号
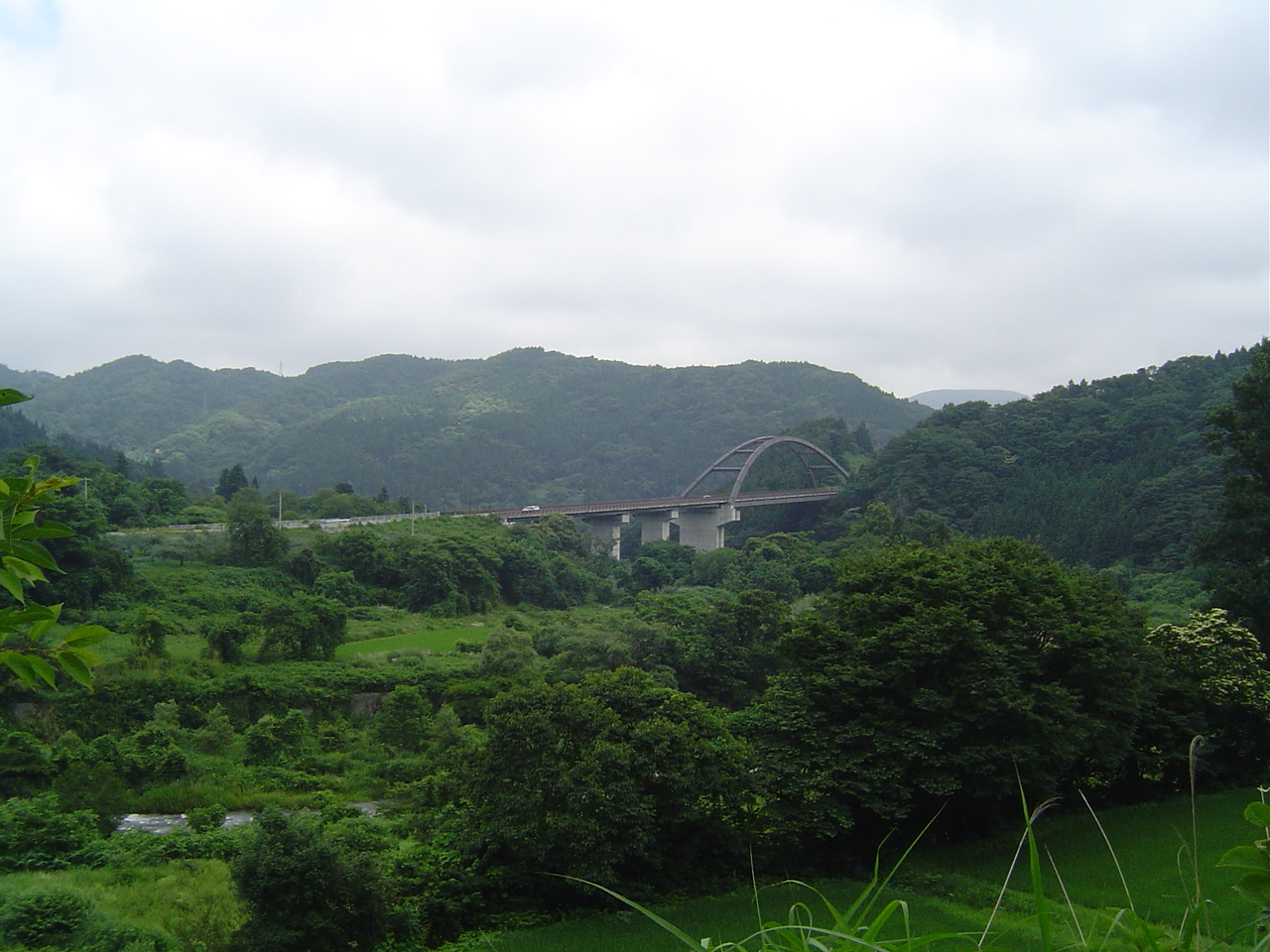

Route information
- Length: 232.7 km (144.6 mi)
- Existed: 18 May 1953–present

Major junctions
- West end: Honmachi junction, Chuo-ku, Niigata
- East end: National Route 6 in Sōma

Location
- Country: Japan

Highway system
- National highways of Japan; Expressways of Japan
← National Route 112	→ National Route 114

National Route 113 (国道113号, Kokudō Hyakujūsan-gō) is a highway in Japan on the island of Honshū which runs from Niigata City in Niigata Prefecture to Sōma in Fukushima Prefecture.

== Route data ==
- Length: 232.7 km (145 mi)
- Origin: Chuo-ku, Niigata (originates at junction with Routes 7, 8, 17, 49 and 116)
- Terminus: Sōma, Fukushima
- Major cities: Niigata

== Municipalities passed through ==
- Niigata Prefecture
  - Niigata (Chuo-ku - Higashi-ku - Kita-ku) - Seirō - Shibata - Tainai - Arakawa - Sekikawa
- Yamagata Prefecture
  - Oguni - Iide - Kawanishi - Nagai - Nan'yō - Takahata
- Miyagi Prefecture
  - Shichikashuku - Shiroishi - Kakuda - Marumori
- Fukushima Prefecture
  - Shinchi - Sōma
