= Japan National Route 287 =

Road in Yamagata prefecture, Japan

National Route 287
- 国道287号
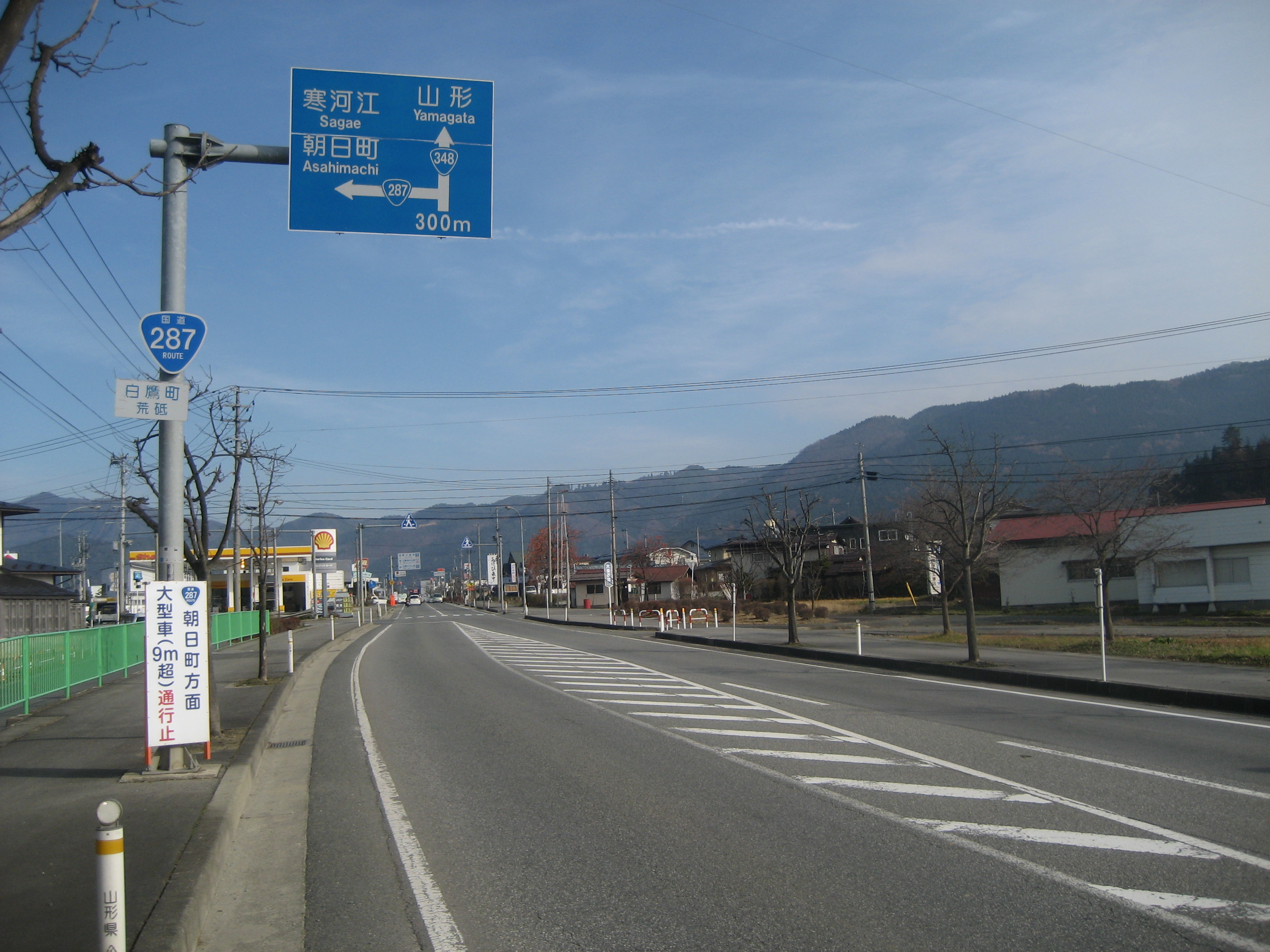

Route information
- Length: 82 km (51 mi)

Location
- Country: Japan

Highway system
- National highways of Japan; Expressways of Japan
← National Route 286	→ National Route 288

National Route 287 is a national highway of Japan connecting Yonezawa, Yamagata and Higashine, Yamagata in Japan, with a total length of 82 km (50.95 mi).
