= Akayu Station =

Railway station in Nan'yō, Yamagata Prefecture, Japan

Akayu Station 赤湯駅
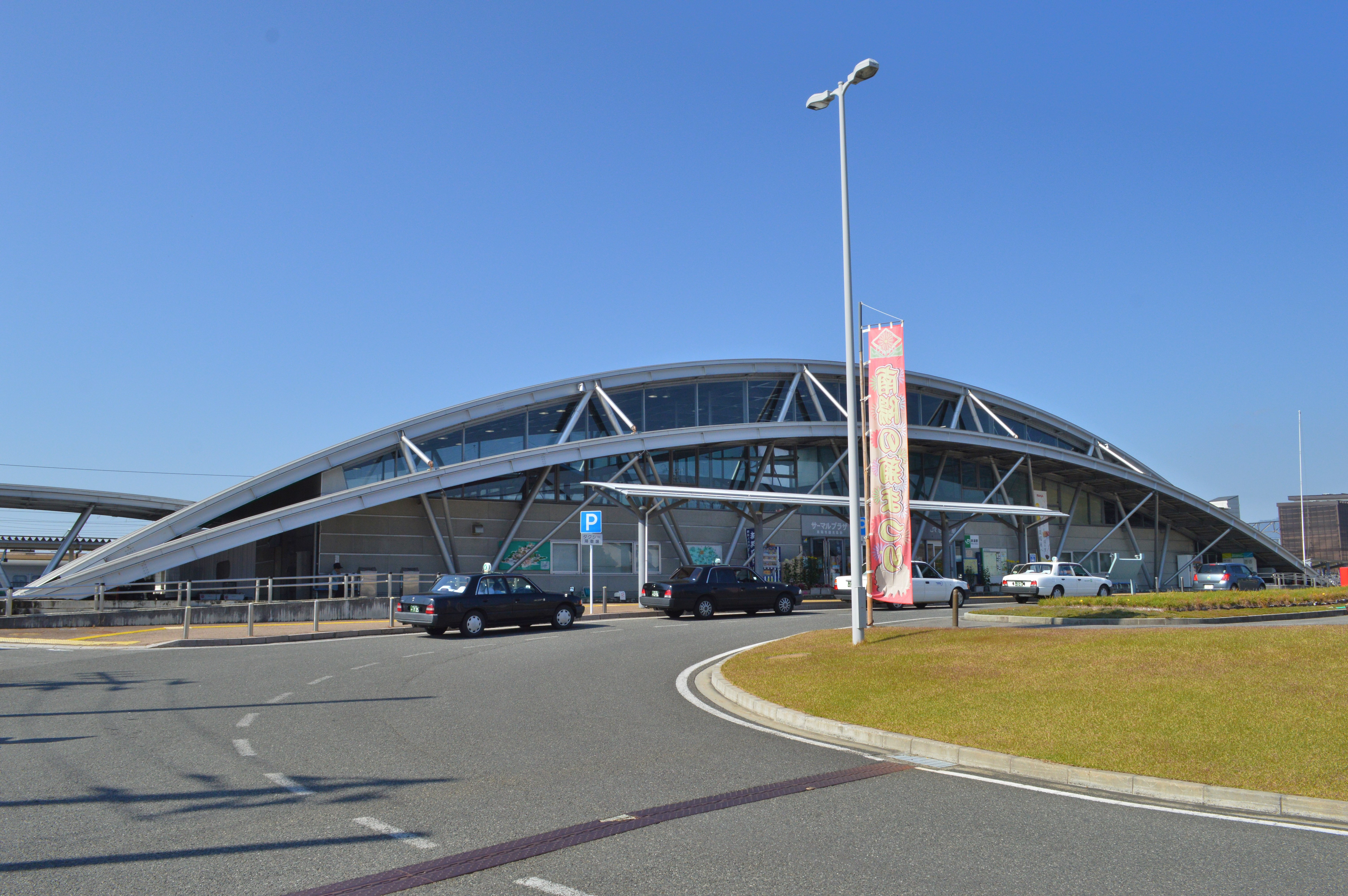
- Akayu Station in October 2015

General information
- Location: Kōriyama, Nan'yō-shi, Yamagaa-ken (JR East); 863 Wakasagōya, Nan'yō-shi, Yamagata-ken (Yamagata Railway); Japan
- Coordinates: 38°02′50″N 140°08′57″E
- Operator: JR East; Yamagata Railway
- Lines: Yamagata Shinkansen; Ōu Main Line; ■ Flower Nagai Line
- Distance: 56.1 km (34.9 mi) from Fukushima
- Platforms: 1 side + 1 island platform
- Tracks: 4

Construction
- Structure type: At grade

Other information
- Status: Staffed (Midori no Madoguchi)

History
- Opened: 21 April 1900; 126 years ago

Passengers
- FY2018: 1,322 daily (JR East)

Services
Preceding station	JR East	Following station
Takahata towards Tokyo	Yamagata Shinkansen Tsubasa	Kaminoyama-Onsen towards Shinjō
Takahata towards Fukushima	Yamagata Line	Nakagawa towards Shinjō
Preceding station	Yamagata Railway	Following station
Nanyō-Shiyakusho towards Arato	Flower Nagai Line	Terminus
Location
- Location within Yamagata Prefecture Location within Japan

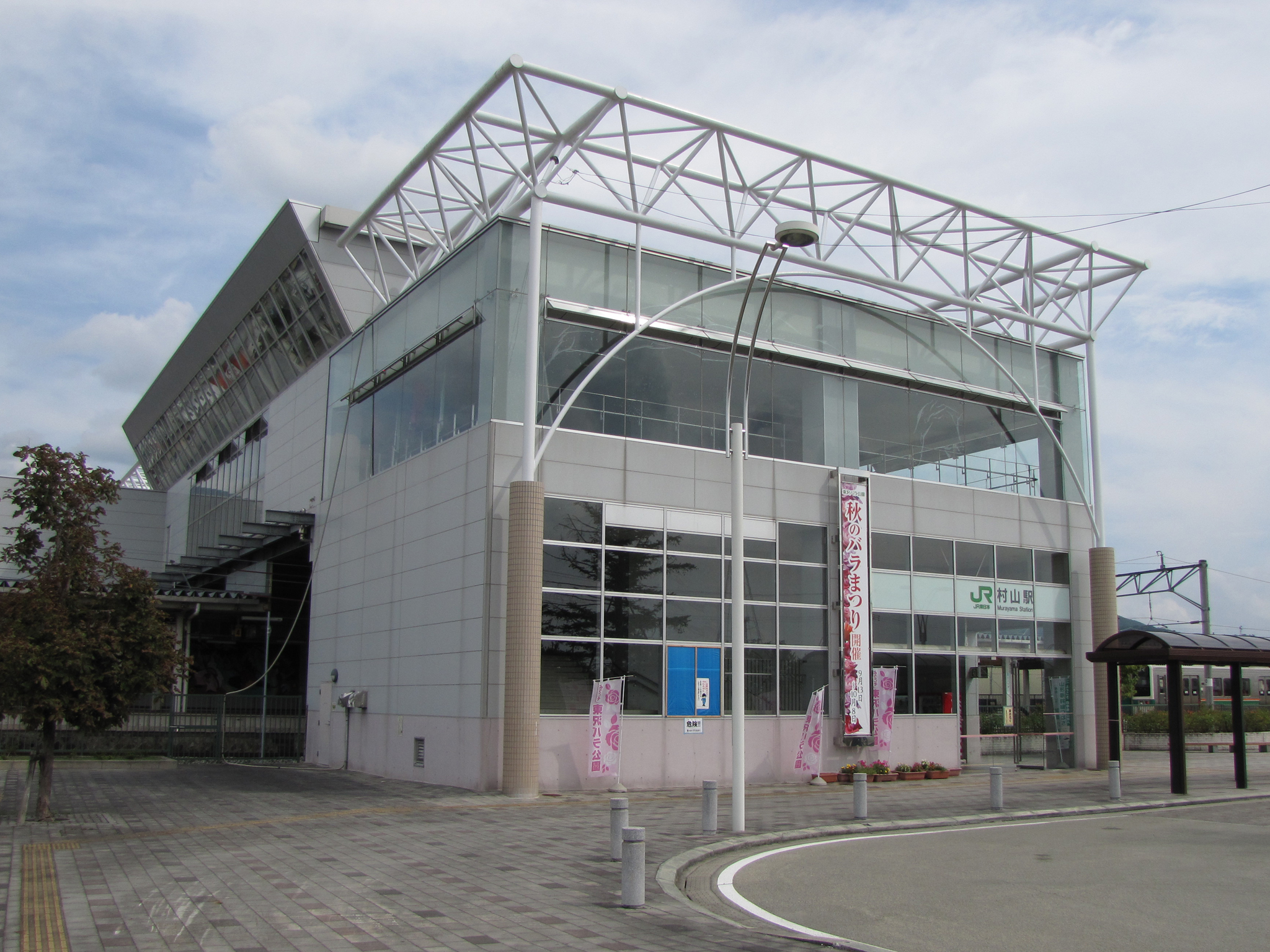
The west entrance in September 2012

Akayu Station (赤湯駅, Akayu-eki) is a junction railway station in the city of Nan'yō, Yamagata Prefecture, Japan., operated by the East Japan Railway Company (JR East), with the Yamagata Railway Company as a tenant.

== Lines ==
Akayu Station is served by the Ōu Main Line and the Yamagata Shinkansen, and is located 56.1 rail kilometers from the terminus of both lines at Fukushima Station and 328.9 kilometers from Tokyo Station. It is also the terminus of the Yamagata Railway Flower Nagai Line, located 30.5 kilometers from the opposing terminal of the line a Arato.

== Station layout ==
The station has one side platform and one island platform connected to the station building by a footbridge. The station has a Midori no Madoguchi staffed ticket office.

=== Platforms ===
1	■ Yamagata Shinkansen	for Yonezawa, Fukushima, Tokyo
2	■ Yamagata Shinkansen	for Yamagata and Shinjō
3	■ Yamagata Line	for Yonezawa
4	■ Flower Nagai Line	for Miyauchi, Imaizumi, Arato

== History ==
Akayu Station opened on 21 April 1900. The Yamagata Railway connected to the station on 26 October 1913. The station was absorbed into the JR East network upon the privatization of JNR on 1 April 1987.

== Passenger statistics ==
In fiscal 2018, the JR portion of the station was used by an average of 1322 passengers daily (boarding passengers only).

== Surrounding area ==
- Akayu Hot Springs
- National Route 113

== See also ==
- List of railway stations in Japan
