= Awashima =

Awashima may refer to:

- 13039 Awashima, main-belt asteroid
- Awashimaura, Niigata, Japanese village
- Awashima Island (disambiguation), several Japanese islands

== People with the surname ==
- Chikage Awashima (淡島 千景, 1924–2012), Japanese actress
