= Kamihayashi, Niigata =

Coordinates: 38°10′58.2″N 139°27′23.3″E

Kamihayashi 神林村
- Former municipality
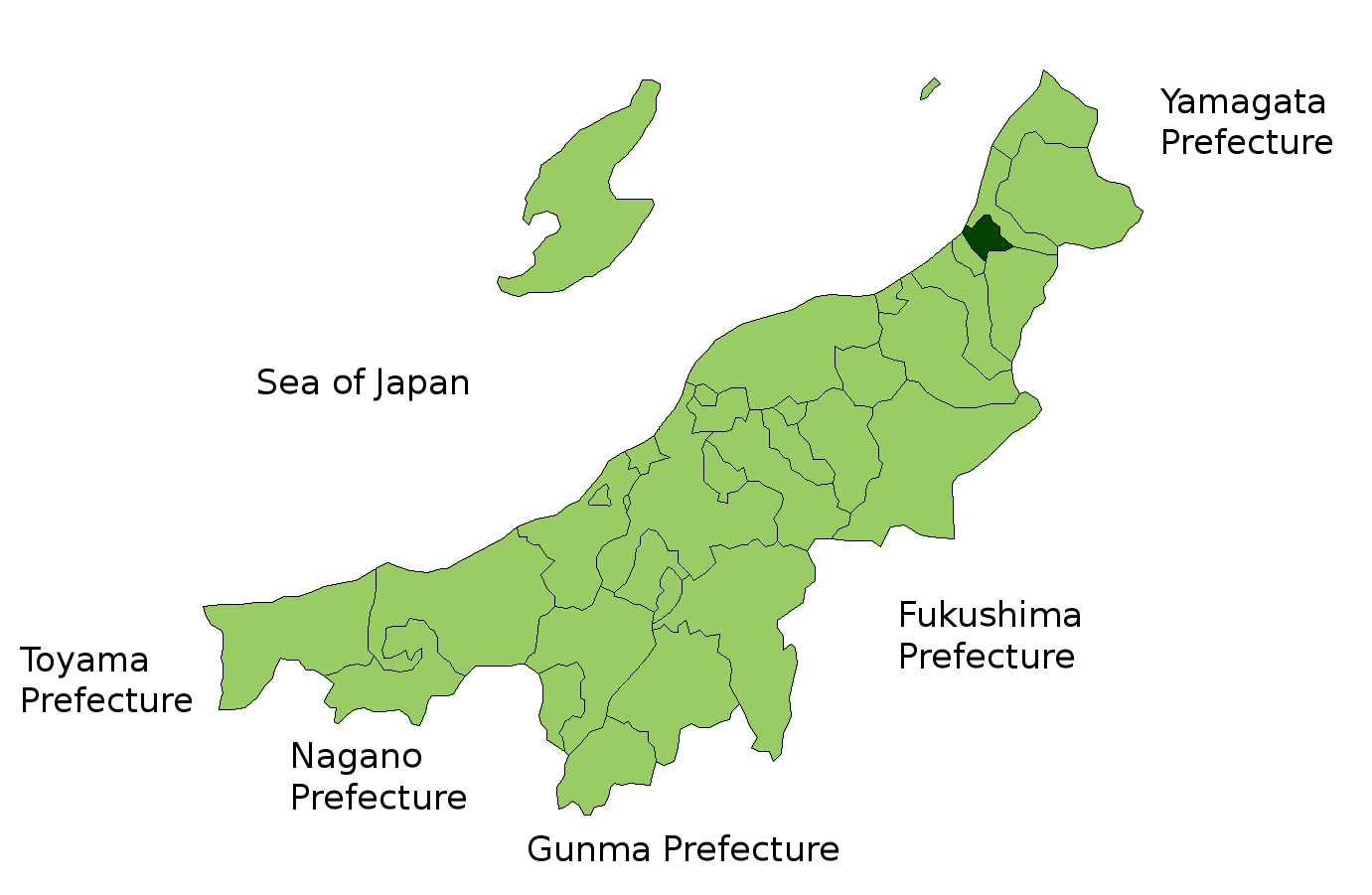
- Location of Kamihayashi in Niigata Prefecture
- Country: Japan
- Region: Hokuriku
- Prefecture: Niigata Prefecture
- District: Iwafune District
- Merged: April 1, 2008 (now part of Murakami)

Area
  - Total: 82.18 km^{2} (31.73 sq mi)

Population (2008)
  - Total: 9,810
- Time zone: UTC+09:00 (JST)
- Symbols
- Flower: Lilium
- Tree: Pine

Kamihayashi (神林村, Kamihayashi-mura) was a village located in Iwafune District, Niigata Prefecture, Japan.

As of 2003, the village had an estimated population of 10,228 and a density of 124.46 persons per km^{2}. The total area was 82.18 km^{2}.

On April 1, 2008, Kamihayashi, along with the towns of Arakawa and Sanpoku, and the village of Asahi (all from Iwafune District), was merged into the expanded city of Murakami.

== Transportation ==
=== Railway ===
- JR East: Uetsu Main Line (Hirabayashi Station, Iwafunemachi Station)

=== Road ===
- Japan National Route 7
- Japan National Route 290
- Japan National Route 345
