= Hirabayashi Castle =

- 平林城
- Murakami, Niigata Prefecture, Japan
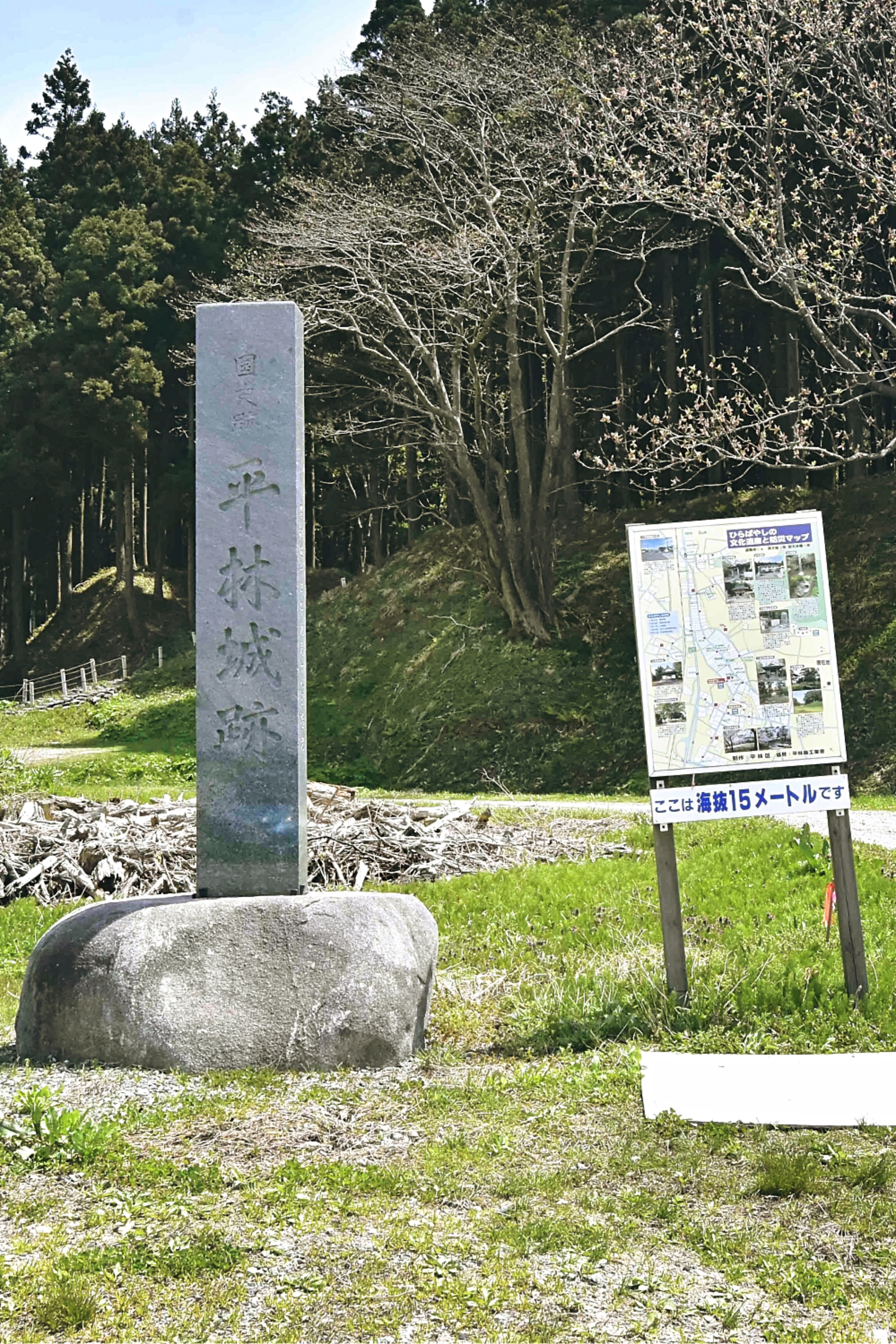
- Site of Hirabayashi Castle

Site information
- Type: hilltop-style Japanese castle
- Open to the public: yes (hiking course)
- Condition: ruins

Location
- Coordinates: 38°08′10″N 139°28′47″E

Site history
- Built: c. 1500
- Built by: Hirabayashi clan
- In use: Sengoku period
- Demolished: 1598

Hirabayashi Castle (平林城, Hirabayashi-jō) was a Sengoku period Japanese castle located in the Kamihayashi neighborhood of the city of Murakami, northern Niigata Prefecture, Japan. The castle ruins have been protected as a National Historic Site since 1978.

== Background ==
Hirabayashi Castle is located on top of Mount Yōgai, a 200-meter hill near the mouth of the Arakawa River, and at the northern edge of the Echigo Plain. The location is more than 200 kilometers from the Jōetsu area, which contained the provincial capital of Echigo Province, and was isolated from Dewa to the north and east by mountains.

== History ==
During the Sengoku period, northern Echigo was controlled by a number of petty lords known as the “Agakitashu”, who were originally the magistrates sent by absentee landlords to administer shōen manors in the area during the Kamakura period. Over the centuries, the position became hereditary, and these magistrates became virtually independent. The Hirabayashi area was originally controlled by the Hirabayashi clan, the original builders of the castle. However, during the Nanboku-chō period, their territory was seized by the Irobe clan. The Irobe were a cadet branch of the Taira clan from the Chichibu region of what is now Saitama Prefecture and were thus related to the Honjō clan of neighbouring Murakami Castle. At the beginning of 16th century, the Nagao clan, a cadet branch of the Uesugi clan grew in power in southern Echigo. During an internal conflict between different branches of the Nagao, the Irobe supported Nagao Fusayoshi, the shugo of Echigo against Nagao Tamekage, the deputy shugo. Tamekage ordered the Nakajō clan, a powerful neighbour, to attack Hirabayashi Castle. The castle eventually fell, and the Irobe were forced to pledge fealty to Nagao Tamekage.

The Irobe revolted when Nagao Tamekage was replaced by his son, Nagao Harukage, however, when Uesugi Kagetora (Kenshin) succeeded Harukage, the Irobe became his retainers. Irobe Katsunaga (1493-1569) achieved distinction as an Uesugi general at the fourth Battle of Kawanakajima in 1561. During the 1563 campaign against the Odawara Hōjō, he captured Sano Castle in Kōzuke and was ranked as seventh among Kenshin's generals. After the death of Kenshin in 1578, the Irobe supported his successor Uesugi Kagekatsu. In 1598, Uesugi Kagekatsu was transferred to Aizu by order of Toyotomi Hideyoshi, and the Irobe clan accompanied him to his new domains. Hirabayashi Castle was abandoned and fell into ruin afterwards.

The remains of several kuruwa and portions of earthworks, moats, and wells can still be found at the site. The castle ruins are located about 20 minutes on foot from Hirabayashi Station on the JR East Uetsu Main Line.

== Design of Hirabayashi Castle ==
Hirabayashi Castle was typical of Sengoku period mountain forts in that it consisted of several enclosures spread across a long and narrow ridge, utilising the natural terrain as part of its defences. The inner bailey is located at the top of the mountain, and is roughly pentagonal in shape, and was protected by a simple clay wall. The main gate to the inner bailey as a large "masugata"-style gate. A peacetime residence was located at the foot of the mountain. Archaeological excavations have determined that the site of the residence stretches for about 300 meters from east-to-west and about 200 meters from north-to-south, has large earthworks and empty moats in good condition.

== See also ==
- List of Historic Sites of Japan (Niigata)

== Literature ==
- Schmorleitz, Morton S. (1974). Castles in Japan. Tokyo: Charles E. Tuttle Co. pp. 144–145. ISBN 0-8048-1102-4.
- Motoo, Hinago (1986). Japanese Castles. Tokyo: Kodansha. p. 200 pages. ISBN 0-87011-766-1.
- Mitchelhill, Jennifer (2004). Castles of the Samurai: Power and Beauty. Tokyo: Kodansha. p. 112 pages. ISBN 4-7700-2954-3.
- Turnbull, Stephen (2003). Japanese Castles 1540-1640. Osprey Publishing. p. 64 pages. ISBN 1-84176-429-9.
