= Awashima Island, Niigata =

Island in Niigata, Japan

Awashima
Native name: 粟島
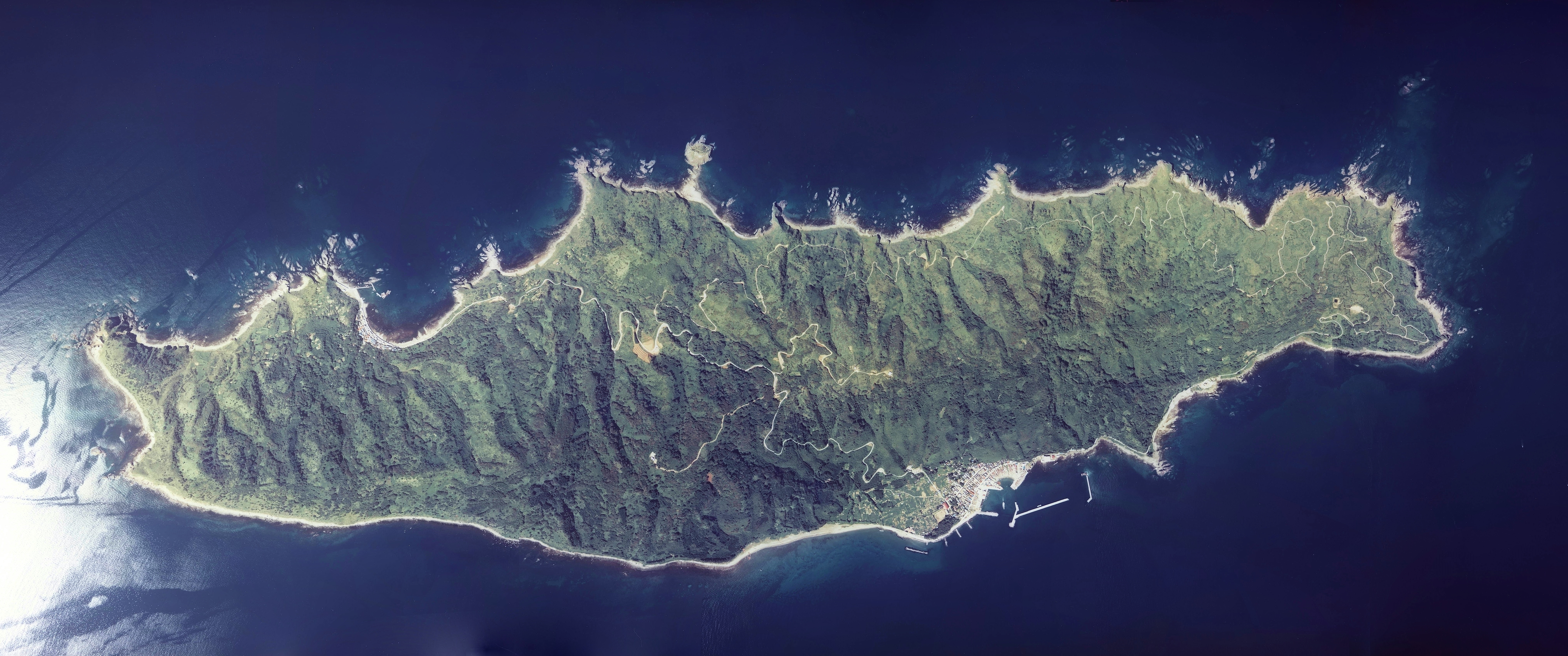
- Aerial photograph of Awashima in 1977

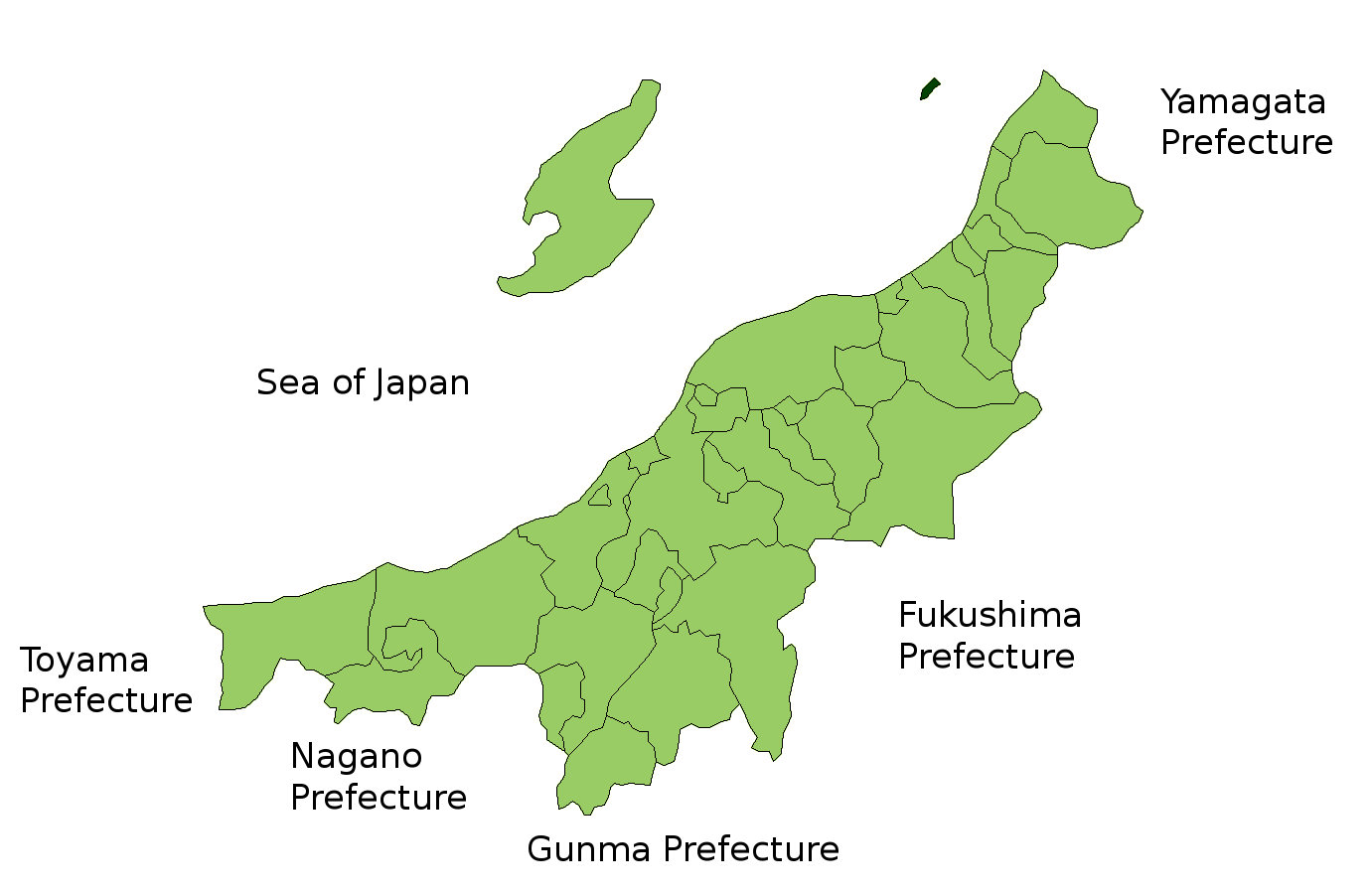

Geography
- Location: Sea of Japan
- Coordinates: 38°27′13″N 139°14′18″E
- Area: 9.86 km^{2} (3.81 sq mi)
- Length: 6,100 m (20000 ft)
- Width: 4,400 m (14400 ft)
- Coastline: 23,000 m (75000 ft)
- Highest elevation: 265.6 m (871.4 ft)

Administration
- Japan
- Prefecture: Niigata
- District: Iwafune
- Village: Awashimaura

Demographics
- Population: 353 (October 2020)
- Ethnic groups: Japanese

Aerial video of Awashima Island in summer

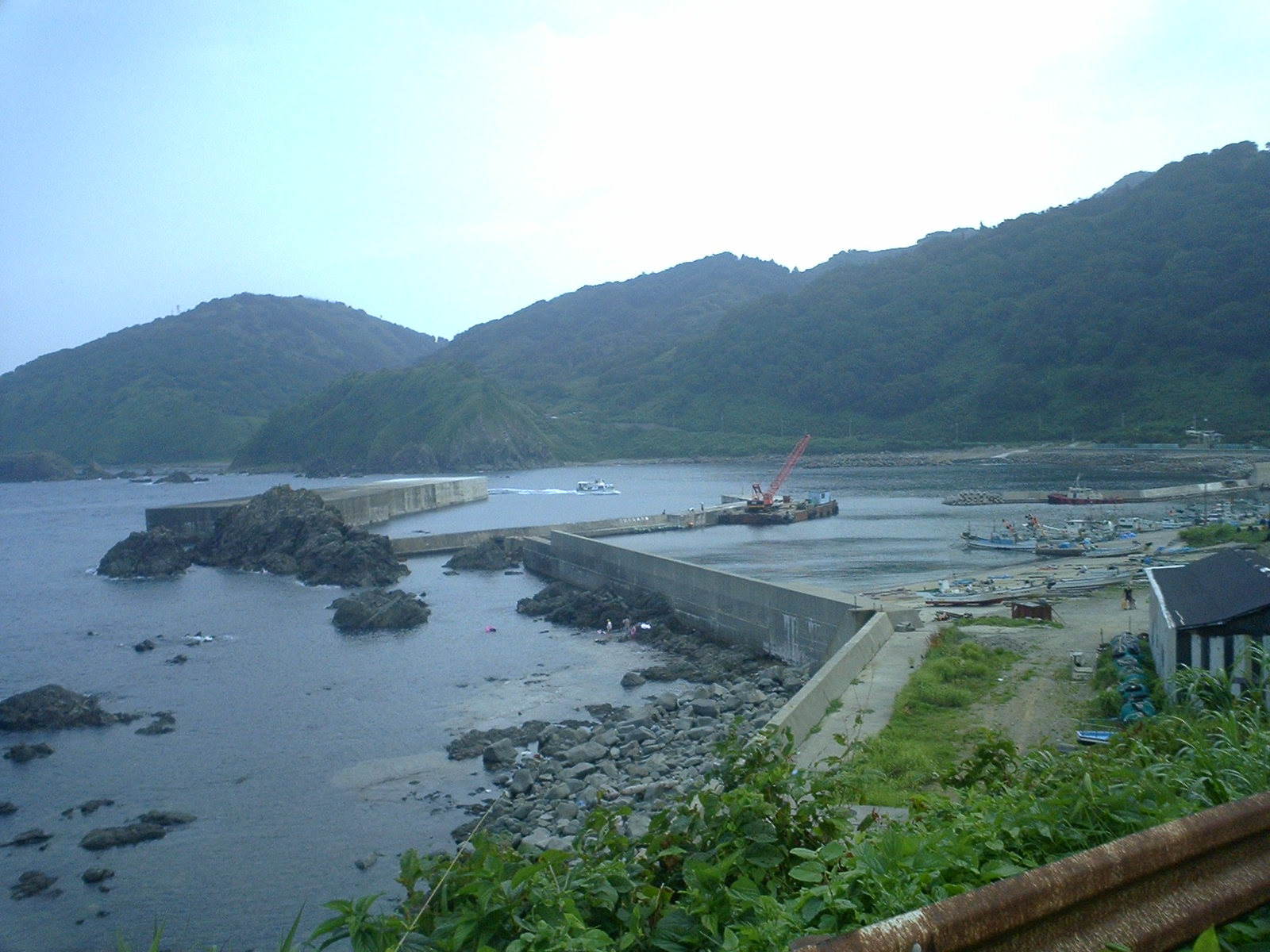
Kamaya area of Awashima

Awashima (粟島) is an island in the Sea of Japan. The island is located approximately 30 kilometres (19 mi) west of the city of Murakami in northern Niigata Prefecture.

Awashima is administratively the village of Awashimaura under Iwafune District of Niigata Prefecture. As of 2020, the island's population is 353.

== History ==
Awashima has been inhabited since at least the Jōmon period, as archaeologists have found Jōmon period pottery shards in five locations on the islands east coast. However, no evidence of inhabitation from the Yayoi period or the Kofun period has yet been discovered. The name of the island first appears in a verse in the Nara period Man'yōshū poetry anthology, at which time the island was on the frontier of the Yamato state with the Emishi. The Matsura clan of northern Kyushu, noted pirates and sea traders, began to occupy the eastern shore of the island from the 9th century, gradually pushing the Emishi out. During the Edo period, the island passed between Murakami Domain, Shonai Domain and direct control by the Tokugawa Shogunate several times. During the Boshin War, the Schnell brothers offloaded weapons for Shonai Domain at Awashima. After the Meiji restoration, the village of Asahimaura was created in 1909 as part of Iwafune, District, Niigata Prefecture. The epicentre of the 1964 Niigata earthquake was near Awashima.

== Climate ==
Climate data for Awashima (1991−2020 normals, extremes 1978−present)
Month	Jan	Feb	Mar	Apr	May	Jun	Jul	Aug	Sep	Oct	Nov	Dec	Year
Record high °C (°F)	13.7 (56.7)	18.8 (65.8)	20.2 (68.4)	26.6 (79.9)	29.6 (85.3)	31.8 (89.2)	36.0 (96.8)	37.0 (98.6)	36.5 (97.7)	29.6 (85.3)	23.3 (73.9)	18.7 (65.7)	37.0 (98.6)
Mean daily maximum °C (°F)	5.5 (41.9)	5.8 (42.4)	9.1 (48.4)	14.5 (58.1)	19.7 (67.5)	23.5 (74.3)	27.1 (80.8)	29.3 (84.7)	25.6 (78.1)	20.0 (68.0)	14.2 (57.6)	8.7 (47.7)	16.9 (62.5)
Daily mean °C (°F)	3.1 (37.6)	3.0 (37.4)	5.6 (42.1)	10.3 (50.5)	15.4 (59.7)	19.6 (67.3)	23.6 (74.5)	25.5 (77.9)	22.0 (71.6)	16.5 (61.7)	11.0 (51.8)	5.9 (42.6)	13.5 (56.2)
Mean daily minimum °C (°F)	0.5 (32.9)	0.2 (32.4)	2.1 (35.8)	6.3 (43.3)	11.5 (52.7)	16.3 (61.3)	20.9 (69.6)	22.4 (72.3)	18.7 (65.7)	12.9 (55.2)	7.6 (45.7)	3.0 (37.4)	10.2 (50.4)
Record low °C (°F)	−5.8 (21.6)	−6.8 (19.8)	−3.2 (26.2)	−0.8 (30.6)	3.9 (39.0)	9.5 (49.1)	12.8 (55.0)	16.1 (61.0)	10.5 (50.9)	5.9 (42.6)	−0.6 (30.9)	−4.3 (24.3)	−6.8 (19.8)
Average precipitation mm (inches)	138.2 (5.44)	92.4 (3.64)	93.3 (3.67)	85.6 (3.37)	95.5 (3.76)	111.8 (4.40)	190.0 (7.48)	154.7 (6.09)	156.1 (6.15)	155.3 (6.11)	156.1 (6.15)	170.5 (6.71)	1,602.8 (63.10)
Average precipitation days (≥ 1.0 mm)	23.5	18.1	16.4	11.9	10.4	9.5	12.3	9.9	12.5	13.9	18.1	22.4	178.9
Mean monthly sunshine hours	52.1	75.2	140.4	195.1	222.5	203.8	183.8	226.5	169.1	145.9	91.8	53.9	1,763.1
Source: Japan Meteorological Agency

== Important Bird Area ==
The island has been recognised as an Important Bird Area (IBA) by BirdLife International because it supports a large breeding colony of streaked shearwaters.

== Minor Planet ==
A minor planet 13039 Awashima has been named after the island.

== See also ==
- List of islands of Japan
