= Awashima Island =

Awashima island may refer to:

- Awashima Island, Kagawa
- Awashima Island, Niigata, where the village of Awashimaura, Niigata is located
- Awashima Island, Shizuoka, host of the Awashima Marine Park and linked to Numazu by the Awashima Kaijō Ropeway
