= Murakami Castle =

- 村上城
- Murakami, Niigata Prefecture, Japan
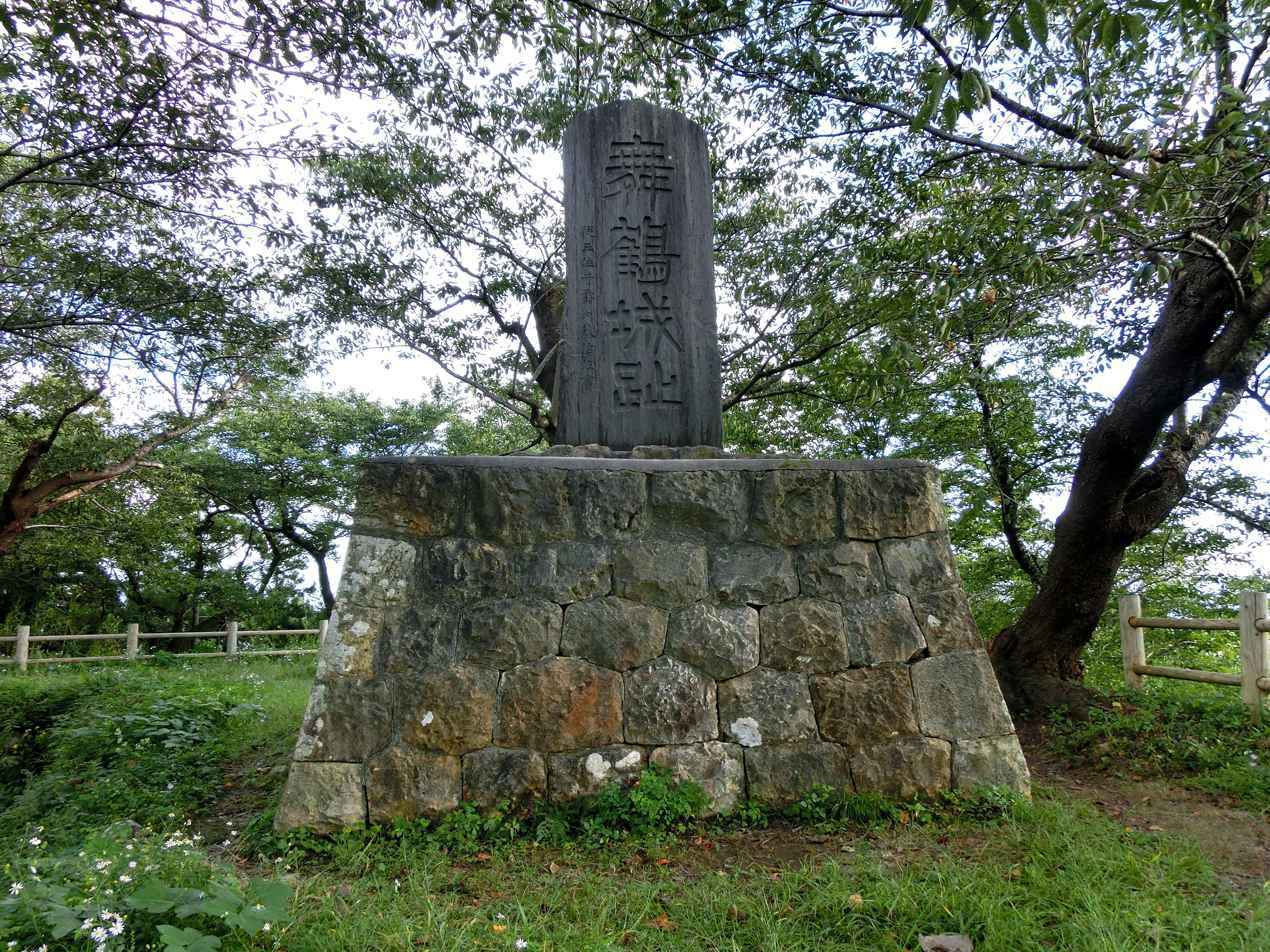
- Monument marking site of Main Keep of Murakami Castle

Site information
- Type: hilltop-style Japanese castle
- Open to the public: yes
- Condition: ruins

Location
- Coordinates: 38°13′11.46″N 139°29′6.00″E

Site history
- Built: c. 1500
- Built by: Honjō clan
- In use: Sengoku period, Edo period
- Demolished: 1868

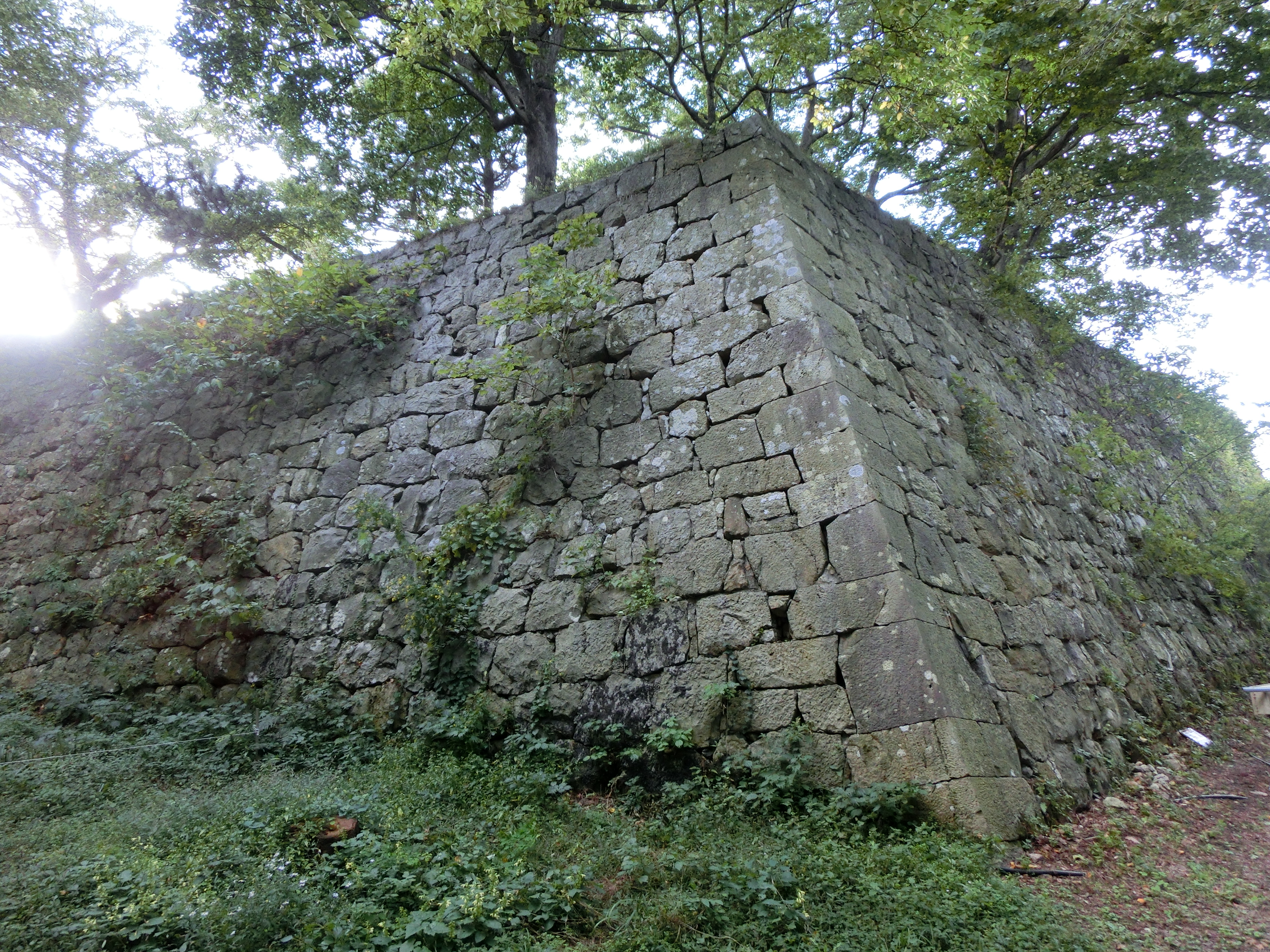
Ramparts of Murakami Castle

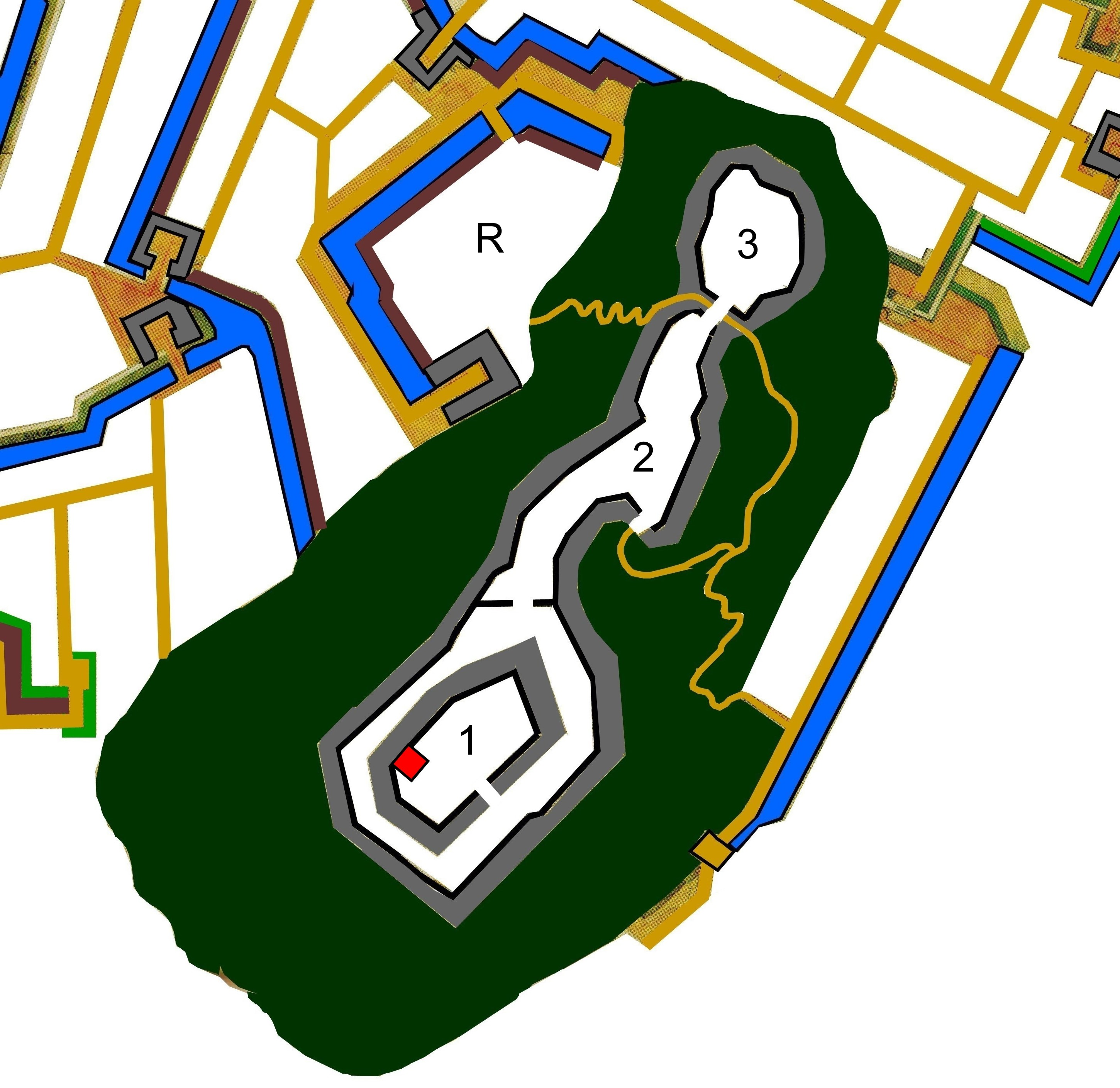
Plan of Murakami Castle

Murakami Castle (村上城, Murakami-jō) is a Japanese castle located in Murakami, northern Niigata Prefecture, Japan. At the end of the Edo period, Murakami Castle was home to a cadet branch of the Naitō clan, daimyō of Murakami Domain under the Tokugawa shogunate. The castle was also known as "Maizuru-jō" (舞鶴城). The ruin been protected as a National Historic Site since 1993. It is about 30 minutes on foot from Murakami Station on the JR East Uetsu Line.

== Background ==
Murakami Castle is located on top of Mount Gagyū (臥牛山), a 135 meter isolated peak in what is now the centre of the city of Murakami. The area is near the mouth of the Miomote River, and at the northern edge of the Echigo Plain. The area is more than 200 kilometers from the Jōetsu area, which contained the provincial capital of Echigo Province, and was isolated from Dewa to the north and east by mountains.

== History ==
During the Sengoku period, in the early 16th century, the Honjō clan fortified the top of Mount Gagyū as their residence. The Honjō were a cadet branch of the Taira clan from the Chichibu region of what is now Saitama Prefecture and seized this area in the Kamakura period. Along with several rival clans, including the Irobe clan based at Hirabayashi Castle, the Honjō were one of the “Agakitashu” who exercised virtually independent control over northern Echigo. In the early Sengoku period, the Honjō were weakened by internal rivalries. Honjō Shigenaga (1540–1614) managed to reunite the clan, but was opposed by Uesugi Kenshin, who had united the Uesugi clan and was in control of southern Echigo. Kenshin defeated the Agakitashu petty lords one after another, and eventually forced Honjō Shigenaga to submit. Shigenaga subsequently became a noted general under Kenshin and fought at the Battle of Kawanakajima against Takeda Shingen. During the 1563 campaign against the Odawara Hōjō, he captured Sano Castle in Kōzuke and was ranked as second among Kenshin's generals. However, he was dissatisfied with the small rewards he received from Kenshin and revolted in 1568 with the encouragement of Takeda Shingen. The outraged Kenshin laid siege to Murakami Castle, but could not take it by force. Shigenaga eventually surrendered in 1569 and was pardoned by Kenshin, but he revolted again ten years later, this time with the backing of Oda Nobunaga. After another bloody battle, he again surrendered and was again pardoned.

After the death of Kenshin in 1578, Shigenaga supported Kenshin's successor Uesugi Kagekatsu. In 1588, Shigenaga defeated a Mogami army at the Battle of Jyugorihara and extended Uesugi control into the Shōnai area. However, in 1598, Uesugi Kagekatsu was transferred to Aizu by Toyotomi Hideyoshi, and Shigenaga also accompanied him.

The early fortifications consisted of earthen ditches and a wooden palisade. Honjō Castle was awarded to Murakami Yorikatsu in 1598, who rebuilt it in the contemporary style with stone ramparts and who renamed it Murakami Castle. The Murakami were followed in 1618 by the Hori clan, who added a three-story tenshu and rebuilt the surrounding castle town into what would eventually become the city of Murakami. Under the Tokugawa shogunate, Murakami saw a frequent change in rulers. The Hori were replaced by the Honda clan in 1643, followed by a branch of the Matsudaira clan in 1649. In 1649, Matsudaira Naoyori rebuilt the tenshu and added new yagura watchtowers. However, in 1667 most of the castle was destroyed in a fire caused by lightning and its tenshu and yagura were not rebuilt after that time. The Matsudaira were replaced by the Sakakibara clan in 1667, followed by the Honda again in 1704, the Matsudaira in 1710, the Manabe clan in 1717 and finally by a cadet branch of the Naitō clan, who ruled until the Meiji Restoration of 1868.

During the Boshin War of the Meiji restoration, although the samurai of the domain were divided between those who were loyal to the Tokugawa shogunate, and those who supported the imperial restoration, the domain joined the pro-Tokugawa Ōuetsu Reppan Dōmei. Due to its strategic position at the entry to Dewa Province, the castle was attacked and destroyed by imperial forces. During the Meiji period, much of the stone ramparts were dismantled and the stones were sold to the townspeople of Murakami as building materials. Fearing that the remnants of the castle would disappear completely, descendants of former Murakami domain samurai formed a society to petition for the protection of the remaining ruins. In 1960, the area was granted protected status as a Niigata Prefectural Historic Monument. In 1993, this status was upgraded to that of a National Historic Site. The castle was listed as one of the Continued Top 100 Japanese Castles in 2017.

== Design of Murakami Castle ==
Mount Gagyū is long and narrow, extending in a north-to-south direction, with the main areas of the castle spread along this ridge. The inner bailey is located at the top of the mountain, and at the southwest corner there was a three-story tenshu. On the northern corner of the inner bailey was a beak-shaped terrace with a long and narrow secondary bailey (kuruwa), extending to the main gate. The stone walls of the inner bailey follow the contour of the original terrain. The main gate to the inner bailey as a large "masugata" gate. To the north of the main gate is the saddle of the ridge, and a third bailey, which was used for the drilling of troops. An outer gate was located on the western hillside, and next to this gate was the residence of the daimyō. The total size of the castle was over 500 square meters, making it the second largest in Echigo after Kasugayama Castle.

== See also ==
- List of Historic Sites of Japan (Niigata)

== Literature ==
- De Lange, William (2021). An Encyclopedia of Japanese Castles. Groningen: Toyo Press. pp. 600 pages. ISBN 978-9492722300.
- Schmorleitz, Morton S. (1974). Castles in Japan. Tokyo: Charles E. Tuttle Co. pp. 144–145. ISBN 0-8048-1102-4.
- Motoo, Hinago (1986). Japanese Castles. Tokyo: Kodansha. p. 200 pages. ISBN 0-87011-766-1.
- Mitchelhill, Jennifer (2004). Castles of the Samurai: Power and Beauty. Tokyo: Kodansha. p. 112 pages. ISBN 4-7700-2954-3.
- Turnbull, Stephen (2003). Japanese Castles 1540-1640. Osprey Publishing. p. 64 pages. ISBN 1-84176-429-9.
