= Sekikawa =

Sekikawa 関川村
- Village
- Sato Residence in Shimoseki

- Flag Seal

- Location of Sekikawa in Niigata

- Coordinates: 38°5′21.8″N 139°33′54.1″E
- Country: Japan
- Region: Chūbu (Kōshin'etsu) (Hokuriku)
- Prefecture: Niigata
- District: Iwafune

Area
  - Total: 299.61 km^{2} (115.68 sq mi)

Population (July 1, 2019)
  - Total: 5,291
  - Density: 17.66/km^{2} (45.74/sq mi)
- Time zone: UTC+9 (Japan Standard Time)
- Phone number: 0254-64-1441
- Address: 912 Shimonoseki, Sekikawa-mura, Iwafune-gun, Niigata-ken 959-3265
- Climate: Cfa
- Website: Official website
- Symbols
- Flower: Lilium
- Tree: Maple

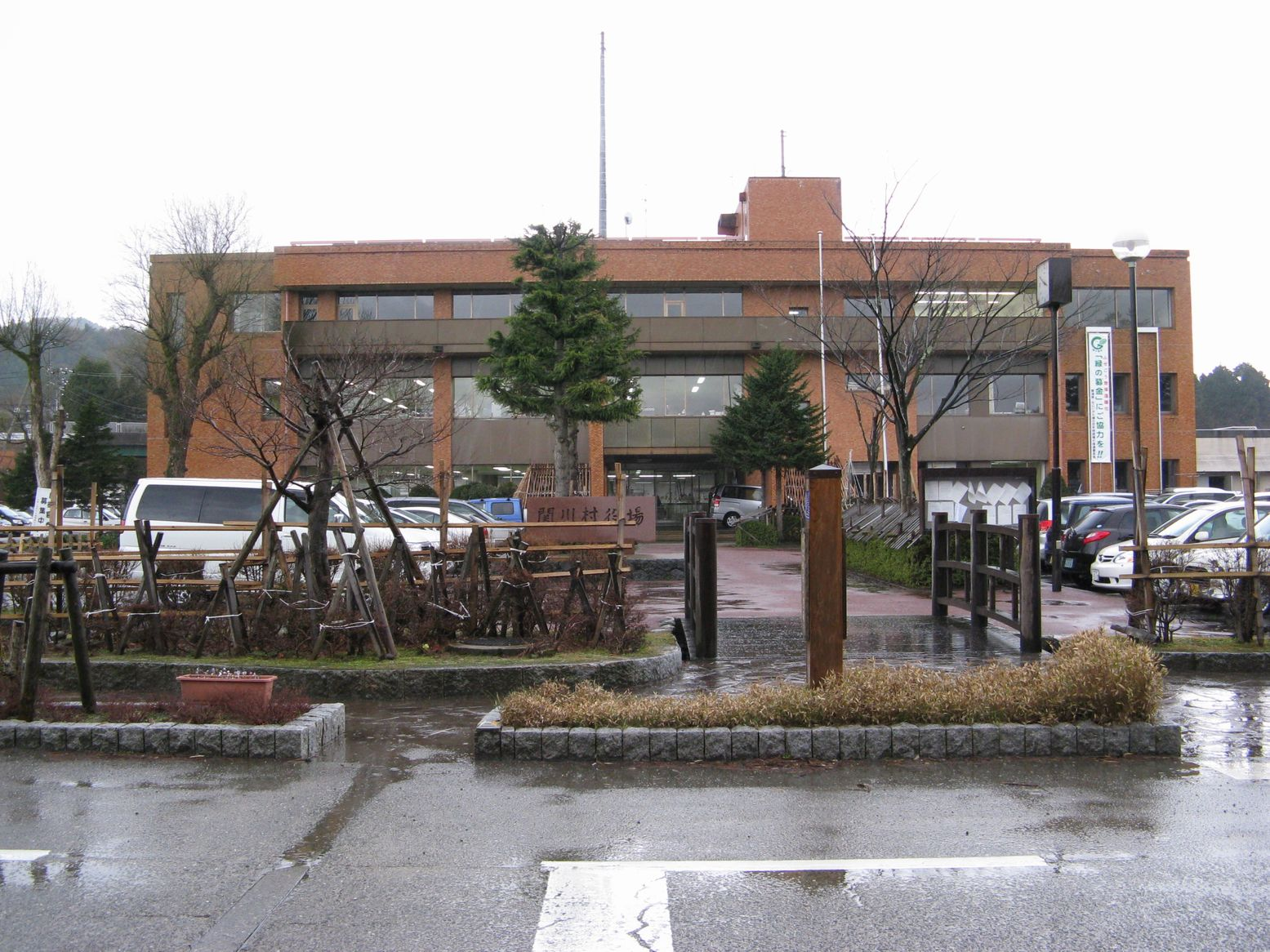
Sekikawa village hall

Sekikawa (関川村, Sekikawa-mura) is a village located in Niigata Prefecture, Japan.

== Population ==
As of 1 July 2019, the village had an estimated population of 5,291 in 1920 households, and a population density of 17.7 persons per km^{2}. The total area of the village was 299.61 square kilometres (115.68 sq mi).

== Geography ==
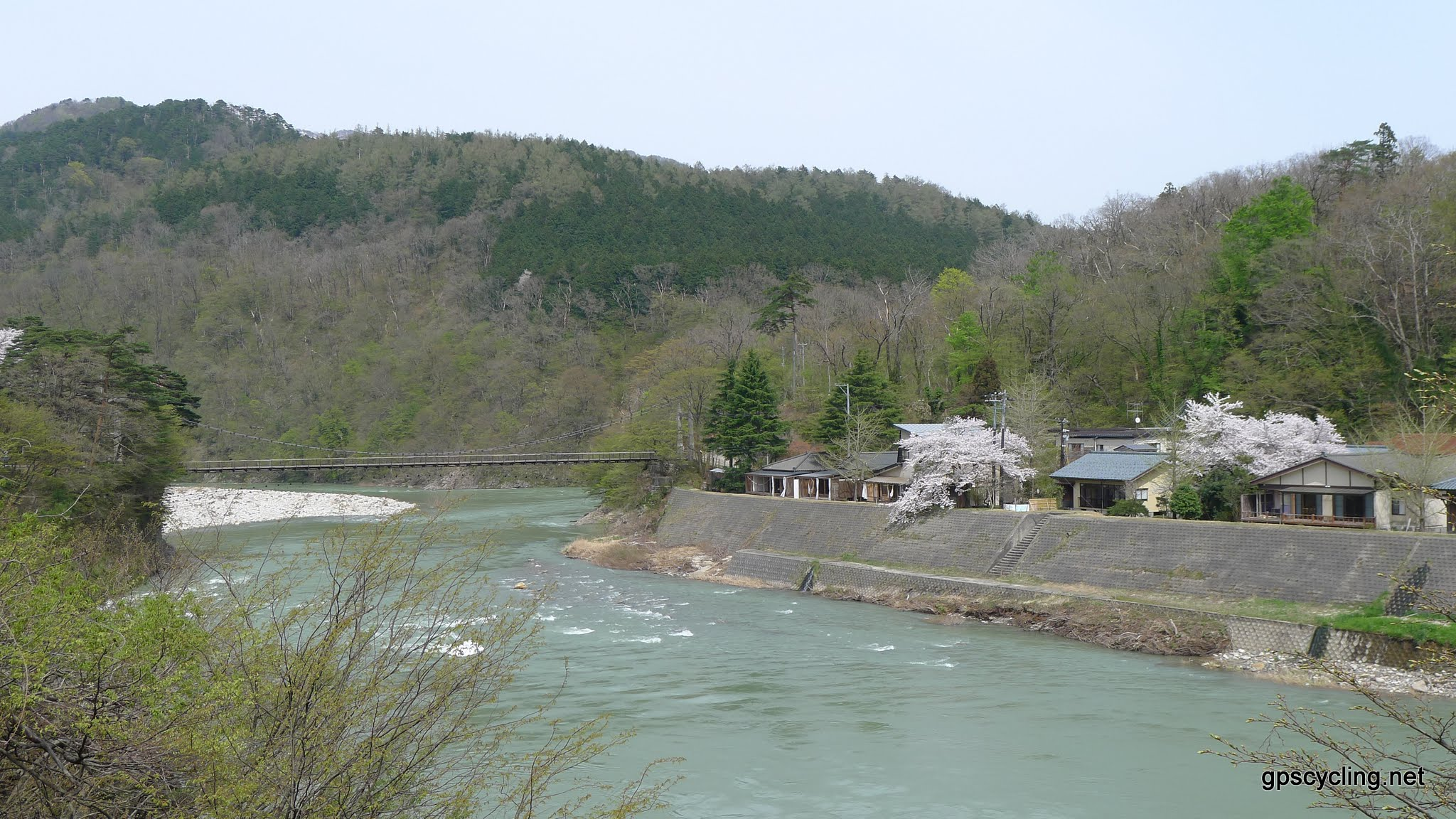
Arakawa River and Takanosu Onsen

Sekikawa is located in mountainous northeastern Niigata Prefecture, bordered by Yamagata Prefecture to the east.

=== Surrounding municipalities ===
- Niigata Prefecture
  - Murakami
  - Tainai
- Yamagata Prefecture
  - Oguni

=== Climate ===
Sekikawa has a humid subtropical climate (Köppen Cfa) characterized by warm, wet summers and cold winters with heavy snowfall. The average annual temperature in Sekikawa is 12.4 °C (54.3 °F). The average annual rainfall is 2,687.2 mm (105.80 in) with September as the wettest month. The temperatures are highest on average in August, at around 25.1 °C (77.2 °F), and lowest in January, at around 1.0 °C (33.8 °F).

Climate data for Sekikawa, elevation 33 m (108 ft), (1991−2020 normals, extremes 1978−present)
Month	Jan	Feb	Mar	Apr	May	Jun	Jul	Aug	Sep	Oct	Nov	Dec	Year
Record high °C (°F)	14.8 (58.6)	18.1 (64.6)	23.3 (73.9)	30.0 (86.0)	32.9 (91.2)	34.3 (93.7)	37.0 (98.6)	39.6 (103.3)	37.0 (98.6)	32.0 (89.6)	24.0 (75.2)	20.4 (68.7)	39.6 (103.3)
Mean daily maximum °C (°F)	3.9 (39.0)	4.6 (40.3)	8.7 (47.7)	15.6 (60.1)	21.6 (70.9)	24.9 (76.8)	28.2 (82.8)	30.1 (86.2)	26.0 (78.8)	19.8 (67.6)	13.3 (55.9)	7.0 (44.6)	17.0 (62.6)
Daily mean °C (°F)	1.0 (33.8)	1.1 (34.0)	4.0 (39.2)	9.8 (49.6)	15.7 (60.3)	20.0 (68.0)	23.8 (74.8)	25.1 (77.2)	21.1 (70.0)	14.8 (58.6)	8.6 (47.5)	3.5 (38.3)	12.4 (54.3)
Mean daily minimum °C (°F)	−1.6 (29.1)	−2.2 (28.0)	−0.4 (31.3)	4.1 (39.4)	10.1 (50.2)	15.3 (59.5)	20.1 (68.2)	21.0 (69.8)	16.9 (62.4)	10.3 (50.5)	4.3 (39.7)	0.4 (32.7)	8.2 (46.7)
Record low °C (°F)	−12.4 (9.7)	−14.1 (6.6)	−10.9 (12.4)	−6.7 (19.9)	0.9 (33.6)	5.6 (42.1)	11.4 (52.5)	11.2 (52.2)	6.3 (43.3)	−0.5 (31.1)	−2.9 (26.8)	−9.6 (14.7)	−14.1 (6.6)
Average precipitation mm (inches)	311.9 (12.28)	200.9 (7.91)	168.9 (6.65)	142.1 (5.59)	138.8 (5.46)	162.6 (6.40)	280.4 (11.04)	207.3 (8.16)	183.4 (7.22)	223.6 (8.80)	313.7 (12.35)	370.9 (14.60)	2,687.2 (105.80)
Average snowfall cm (inches)	206 (81)	168 (66)	58 (23)	2 (0.8)	0 (0)	0 (0)	0 (0)	0 (0)	0 (0)	0 (0)	3 (1.2)	87 (34)	519 (204)
Average extreme snow depth cm (inches)	69 (27)	83 (33)	48 (19)	4 (1.6)	0 (0)	0 (0)	0 (0)	0 (0)	0 (0)	0 (0)	2 (0.8)	31 (12)	86 (34)
Average precipitation days (≥ 1.0 mm)	26.9	22.6	19.8	14.1	12.6	11.8	14.8	12.2	13.9	16.0	20.6	25.5	210.8
Average snowy days (≥ 3 cm)	19.4	16.5	7.2	0.3	0	0	0	0	0	0	0.2	8.7	52.3
Mean monthly sunshine hours	26.7	43.9	91.9	151.3	185.5	160.9	143.8	189.0	141.5	120.9	75.5	38.1	1,369.1
Source: Japan Meteorological Agency

== Demographics ==
Per Japanese census data, the population of Sekikawa has declined steadily over the past 50 years.

Historical population
Year	Pop.	±%
1970	9,559	—
1980	8,632	−9.7%
1990	8,094	−6.2%
2000	7,510	−7.2%
2010	6,438	−14.3%
2020	5,144	−20.1%

== History ==
The area of present-day Sekikawa was part of ancient Echigo Province. During the Edo period, much of the area was part of the holdings of Yonezawa Domain under the Tokugawa shogunate. The area was organized as part of Iwafune District, Niigata following the Meiji restoration. The modern village of Sekigawa was established on August 1, 1954 by the merger of the villages of Seki, Shichikatani, and Kukatani. On August 1, 1954, Sekikawa merged with the neighboring village of Onnagawa.

== Economy ==
The local economy is dominated by agriculture.

== Education ==
Sekikawa has one public elementary school and one public middle school operated by the village government. The village does not have a high school.

== Transportation ==
=== Railway ===
JR East - Yonesaka Line

- Echigo-Kanamaru - Echigo-Katakai - Echigo-Shimoseki - Echigo-Ōshima

=== Highway ===
- National Route 113
- National Route 290
