= Arakawa, Niigata =

Coordinates: 38°7′26.6″N 139°26′37.8″E

Arakawa 荒川町
- Former municipality
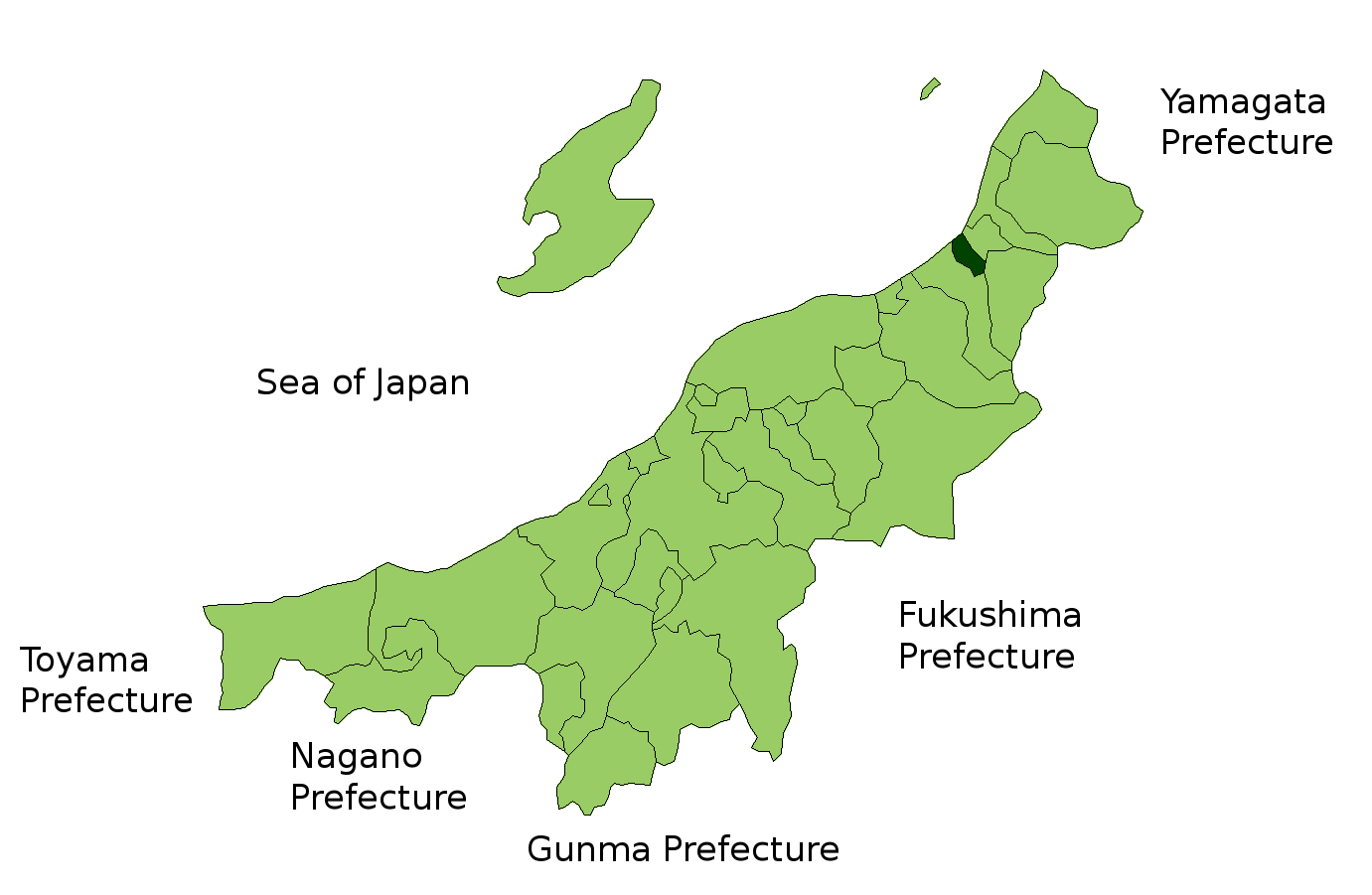
- Location of Arakawa in Niigata Prefecture
- Country: Japan
- Region: Hokuriku
- Prefecture: Niigata Prefecture
- District: Iwafune District
- Merged: April 1, 2008 (now part of Murakami)

Area
  - Total: 36.71 km^{2} (14.17 sq mi)

Population (2008)
  - Total: 10,792
- Time zone: UTC+09:00 (JST)
- Symbols
- Tree: Camellia sasanqua

Arakawa (荒川町, Arakawa-machi) was a town located in Iwafune District, Niigata Prefecture, Japan.

As of 2003, the town had an estimated population of 11,334 and a density of 308.74 persons per km^{2}. The total area was 36.71 km^{2}. Its train station is called Sakamachi.

On April 1, 2008, Arakawa, along with the town of Sanpoku, and the villages of Asahi and Kamihayashi (all from Iwafune District), was merged into the expanded city of Murakami.
