= Echigo-Katakai Station =

Railway station in Sekikawa, Niigata Prefecture, Japan

Echigo-Katakai Station 越後片貝駅
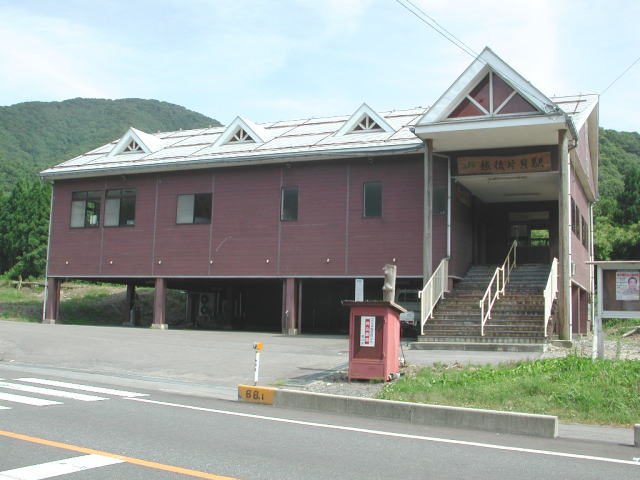
- Echigo-Katakai Station in August 2004

General information
- Location: 83 Katakai, Sekikawa-mura, Iwafune-gun, Niigata-ken 959-3226; Japan
- Coordinates: 38°4′14.63″N 139°37′20.43″E
- Operator: JR East
- Line: ■ Yonesaka Line
- Distance: 73.1 km from Yonezawa
- Platforms: 1 side platform
- Tracks: 1

Other information
- Status: Unstaffed
- Website: Official website

History
- Opened: 30 November 1933; 92 years ago

Services
| Preceding station | JR East | Following station |
|---|---|---|
| Echigo-Shimoseki towards Sakamachi | Yonesaka Line | Echigo-Kanamaru towards Yonezawa |
Location
- Location within Japan

Echigo-Katakai Station (越後片貝駅, Echigo-Katakai-eki) is a railway station in the village of Sekikawa, Niigata Prefecture, Japan, operated by East Japan Railway Company (JR East).

== Lines ==
Echigo-Katakai Station is served by the Yonesaka Line, and is located 73.1 rail kilometers from the terminus of the line at Yonezawa Station.

== Station layout ==
The station has one ground-level side platform serving a single bi-directional track. The station is unattended, but the station building also serves as a local public assembly hall.

== History ==
Echigo-Katakai Station opened on 30 November 1933. The station was absorbed into the JR East network upon the privatization of JNR on 1 April 1987.

== Surrounding area ==
- National Route 113
- Arakawa River

== See also ==
- List of railway stations in Japan
