= Sanpoku, Niigata =

Sanpoku 山北町
- Former municipality
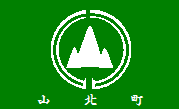
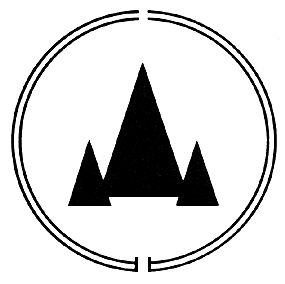
- Flag Seal

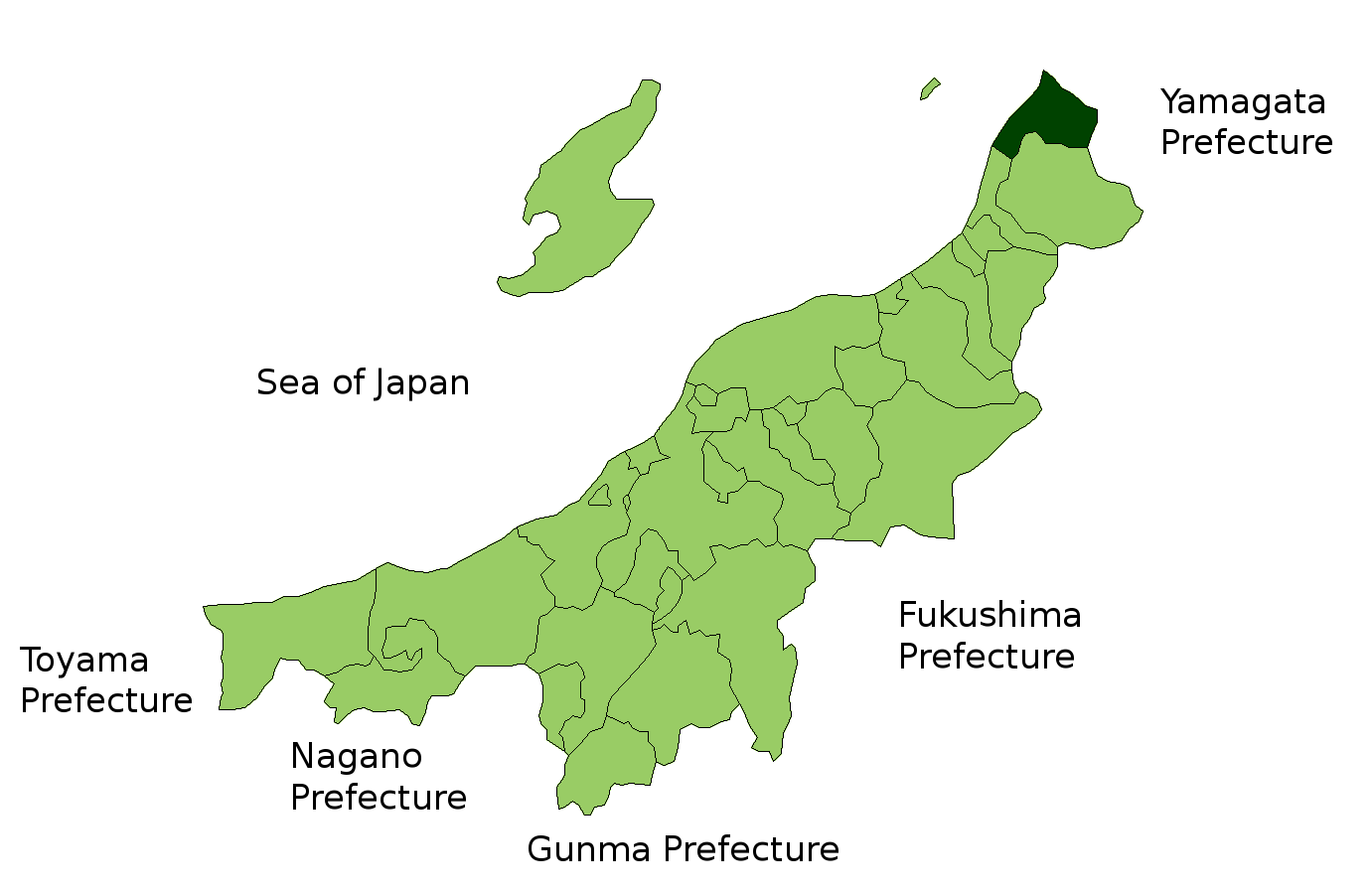
- Location of Sanpoku in Niigata Prefecture

- Location in Japan
- Coordinates: 38°31′N 139°32′E
- Country: Japan
- Region: Hokuriku
- Prefecture: Niigata Prefecture
- District: Iwafune District
- Merged: April 1, 2008 (now part of Murakami)

Area
  - Total: 283.91 km^{2} (109.62 sq mi)

Population (2008)
  - Total: 6,942
- Time zone: UTC+09:00 (JST)
- Symbols
- Tree: Sugi

Sanpoku (山北町, Sampoku-machi) was a town located in Iwafune District, Niigata Prefecture, Japan.

== Population ==
As of 2005, the town had an estimated population of about 7,243 and a density of 25.95 persons per km^{2}. The total area was 283.91 km^{2}.

== History ==
Sanpoku was an isolated town in the northernmost part of Niigata Prefecture, connected by the Uetsu Line (JR East) and National Route 7.

Neighboring municipalities were Tsuruoka in Yamagata Prefecture to the north, as well as Murakami and Asahi in Niigata to the south.

On April 1, 2008, Sanpoku, along with the town of Arakawa, and the villages of Asahi and Kamihayashi (all from Iwafune District), was merged into the expanded city of Murakami.

== Symbols ==
The official town tree was the Sugi and the official town flower was the Japanese Lily.
