= Yamamoto Site =

Archaeological site in Murakami, Japan

Yamamoto ruins
- 山元遺跡 (Japanese)
- Yamamoto ruins Yamamoto Site (Japan)
- 38°13′27″N 139°28′48″E
- Type: settlement
- Periods: Yayoi period
- Location: Murakami, Niigata, Japan
- Region: Hokuriku region

Site notes
- Elevation: 40 m (130 ft)
- Public access: None

The Yamamoto ruins (山元遺跡, Yamamoto iseki) is an archaeological site containing the ruins of a Yayoi period settlement located in what is now part of the city of Murakami, Niigata in the Hokuriku region of Japan. The site was designated a National Historic Site of Japan in 2016. The Yamamoto ruins are the most northerly of all Yayoi period moated hilltop settlements yet discovered.

== Overview ==
The Yamamoto Site is located in the Murakami hills near the Sea of Japan in the northern part of the Niigata Plain. The site has at an elevation of 40 meters above sea level, or 36 meters above the surrounding paddy fields. The ruins were discovered during road construction for a section of the Tōhoku Expressway. The total area of the site is roughly 20,0000 square meters, and consist of a residential area and a grave area separated by a valley with a depth of six meters.

The settlement was surrounded by a defensive moat with a trapezoidal cross-section, with a width of two meters and depth of one meter. The foundations of one pit dwelling and 17 graves have been found, with four of the graves containing earthenware coffins. Artifacts uncovered included Yayoi pottery from both the Tōhoku and Hokuriku regions. and some Jomon pottery. Other items included a small iron sword, stone tools, whetstones, and a large number of glass beads and small bronze tubes. In 2018, 280 of these items were collective designated a Tangible Cultural Property.

== See also ==
- List of Historic Sites of Japan (Niigata)
