= Asahi, Niigata =

Coordinates: 38°16′N 139°32′E

Asahi 朝日村
- Former municipality
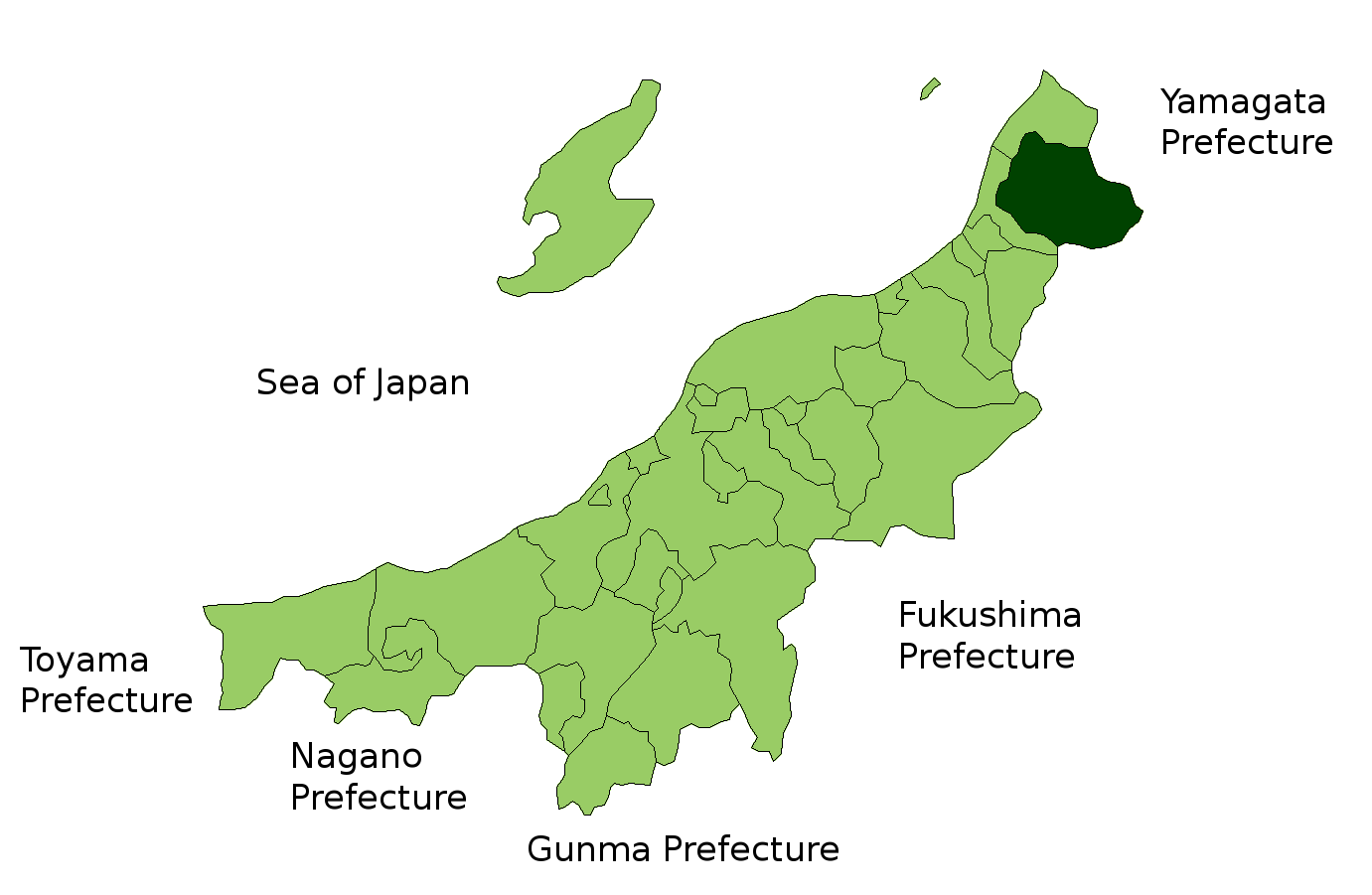
- Location of Asahi in Niigata Prefecture
- Country: Japan
- Region: Hokuriku
- Prefecture: Niigata Prefecture
- District: Iwafune District
- Merged: April 1, 2008 (now part of Murakami)

Area
  - Total: 629.32 km^{2} (242.98 sq mi)

Population (2008)
  - Total: 11,026
- Time zone: UTC+09:00 (JST)
- Symbols
- Bird: Green pheasant
- Flower: Sunflower
- Tree: Sugi

Asahi (朝日村, Asahi-mura) was a village located in Iwafune District, Niigata Prefecture, Japan. The village was named after the Asahi Mountains.

As of 2005, the village had an estimated population of 11,836 and a density of 18.69 persons per km^{2}. The total area was 629.32 km^{2}.

On April 1, 2008, Asahi, along with the towns of Arakawa and Sanpoku, and the village of Kamihayashi (all from Iwafune District), was merged into the expanded city of Murakami.

The village was established in 1896 by merging Tatekoshi (館腰村), Miomote (三面村), Takane (高根村), Shionomachi (塩野町村), and Sarusawa (猿沢村) villages.

Asahi had a sister relationship with Kiyose, Tokyo.
