= Murakami, Niigata =

Murakami 村上市
- City
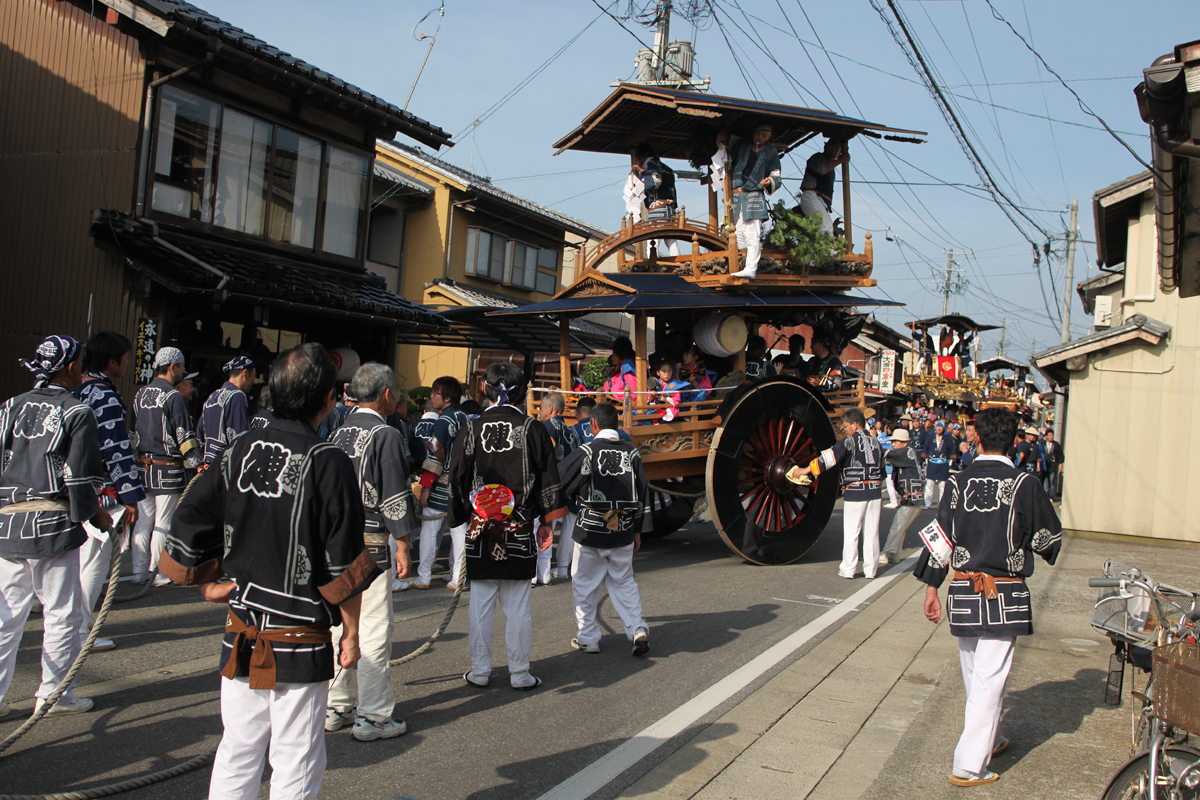
- Murakami Taisai Festival

- Flag Seal

- Location of Murakami in Niigata Prefecture

- Coordinates: 38°13′26.4″N 139°28′48″E
- Country: Japan
- Region: Chūbu (Kōshin'etsu) (Hokuriku)
- Prefecture: Niigata

Area
  - Total: 1,174.26 km^{2} (453.38 sq mi)

Population (December 1, 2020)
  - Total: 58,300
  - Density: 49.6/km^{2} (129/sq mi)
- Time zone: UTC+9 (Japan Standard Time)
- Phone number: 0254-53-2111
- Address: 1-1, Sannochō, Murakami-shi, Niigata-ken 958-8501
- Climate: Cfa
- Website: Official website
- Symbols
- Bird: Spizaetus nipalensis
- Flower: Rosa rugosa
- Tree: Fagus crenata

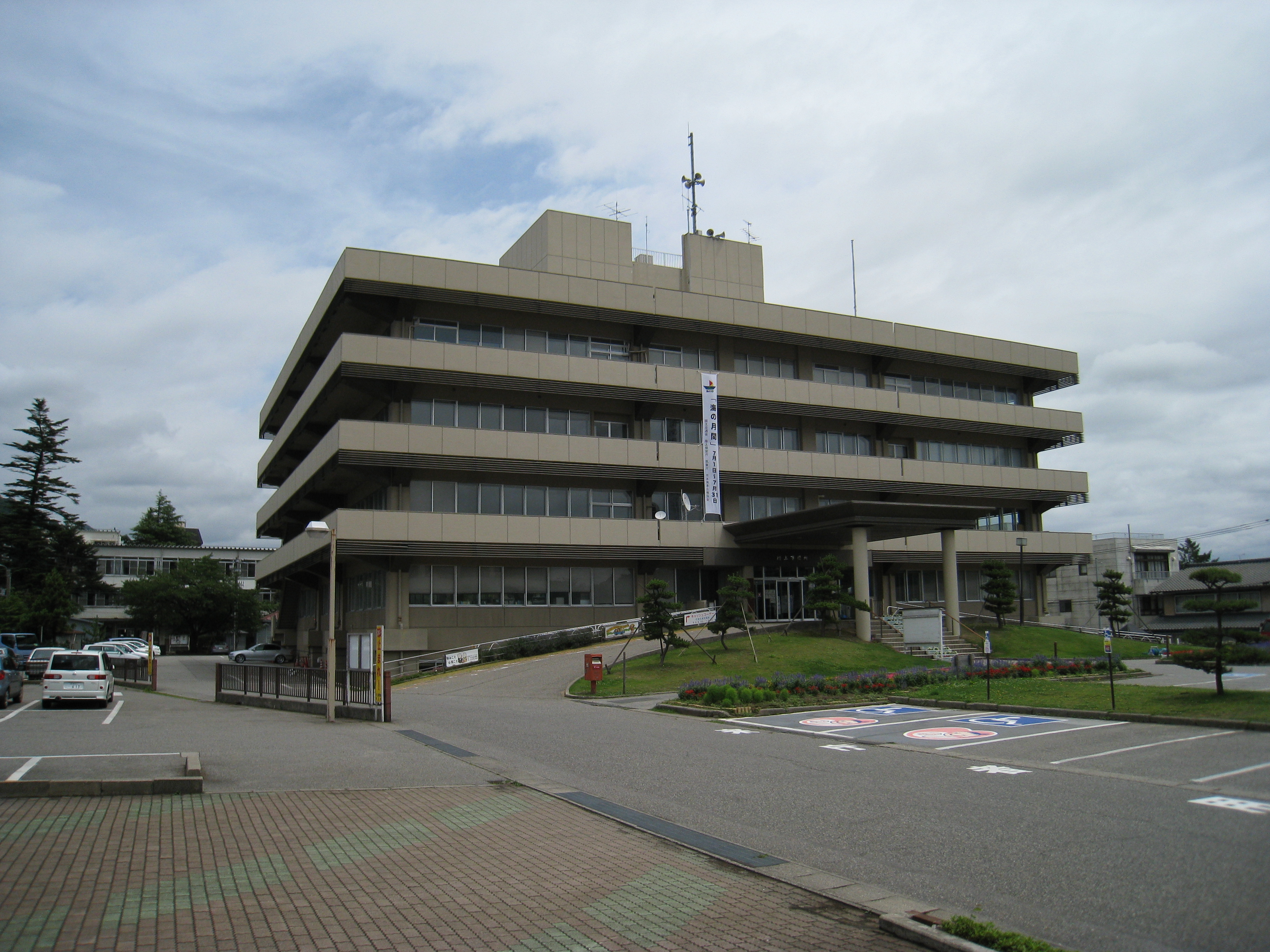
Murakami City Hall

Murakami (村上市, Murakami-shi) is a city located in Niigata Prefecture, Japan. As of 1 December 2020, the city had an estimated population of 58,300 in 22,594 households, and a population density of 50 persons per km². The total area of the city was 1,174.26 square kilometres (453.38 sq mi).

== Geography ==
Aerial video of Goishi Beach and Neya Fishing Port, Murakami

Murakami is the northernmost and easternmost city of Niigata prefecture. Located on the coast of the Sea of Japan, it is bordered by Yamagata Prefecture to the north and east. In terms of area, it is the largest city in Niigata.

=== Surrounding municipalities ===
- Niigata Prefecture
  - Sekikawa
  - Tainai
- Yamagata Prefecture
  - Nishikawa
  - Oguni
  - Tsuruoka

=== Climate ===
Murakami has a humid subtropical climate (Köppen Cfa) characterized by warm, wet summers and cold winters with heavy snowfall. The average annual temperature in Murakami is 12.8 °C (55.0 °F). The average annual rainfall is 2,215.0 mm (87.20 in) with September as the wettest month. The temperatures are highest on average in August, at around 25.5 °C (77.9 °F), and lowest in January, at around 1.7 °C (35.1 °F).

Climate data for Murakami, elevation 10 m (33 ft), (1991−2020 normals, extremes 1978−present)
Month	Jan	Feb	Mar	Apr	May	Jun	Jul	Aug	Sep	Oct	Nov	Dec	Year
Record high °C (°F)	14.8 (58.6)	21.5 (70.7)	23.1 (73.6)	30.3 (86.5)	32.1 (89.8)	34.6 (94.3)	37.2 (99.0)	39.9 (103.8)	38.4 (101.1)	33.7 (92.7)	25.8 (78.4)	20.9 (69.6)	39.9 (103.8)
Mean daily maximum °C (°F)	4.7 (40.5)	5.4 (41.7)	9.4 (48.9)	15.7 (60.3)	21.5 (70.7)	25.2 (77.4)	28.5 (83.3)	30.5 (86.9)	26.4 (79.5)	20.2 (68.4)	13.8 (56.8)	7.8 (46.0)	17.4 (63.4)
Daily mean °C (°F)	1.7 (35.1)	1.8 (35.2)	4.7 (40.5)	10.2 (50.4)	15.9 (60.6)	20.3 (68.5)	24.1 (75.4)	25.5 (77.9)	21.3 (70.3)	15.1 (59.2)	9.2 (48.6)	4.2 (39.6)	12.8 (55.1)
Mean daily minimum °C (°F)	−1.0 (30.2)	−1.4 (29.5)	0.4 (32.7)	4.7 (40.5)	10.7 (51.3)	15.8 (60.4)	20.4 (68.7)	21.3 (70.3)	17.1 (62.8)	10.6 (51.1)	5.0 (41.0)	1.0 (33.8)	8.7 (47.7)
Record low °C (°F)	−9.6 (14.7)	−11.0 (12.2)	−7.5 (18.5)	−5.8 (21.6)	2.2 (36.0)	6.6 (43.9)	10.3 (50.5)	12.3 (54.1)	6.2 (43.2)	1.6 (34.9)	−2.3 (27.9)	−6.9 (19.6)	−11.0 (12.2)
Average precipitation mm (inches)	220.9 (8.70)	147.4 (5.80)	133.9 (5.27)	115.4 (4.54)	128.5 (5.06)	132.1 (5.20)	240.6 (9.47)	180.2 (7.09)	184.5 (7.26)	202.4 (7.97)	246.8 (9.72)	255.0 (10.04)	2,215 (87.20)
Average precipitation days (≥ 1.0 mm)	25.8	21.4	18.5	13.2	12.2	10.5	13.6	11.2	13.8	15.8	19.6	24.4	200
Mean monthly sunshine hours	33.2	55.8	112.7	165.3	193.0	179.5	158.2	201.2	147.2	131.3	80.8	41.2	1,499.4
Source: Japan Meteorological Agency

== Demographics ==
Per Japanese census data, the population of Murakami has declined steadily over the past 70 years.

Historical population
Year	Pop.	±%
1920	65,589	—
1930	71,714	+9.3%
1940	74,324	+3.6%
1950	92,840	+24.9%
1960	92,322	−0.6%
1970	83,107	−10.0%
1980	80,206	−3.5%
1990	76,511	−4.6%
2000	73,902	−3.4%
2010	66,427	−10.1%
2020	58,300	−12.2%

== History ==
Municipalities merger in 2008

The area of present-day Murakami was part of ancient Echigo Province. Murakami developed as a port and a castle town for the Murakami Domain under the Tokugawa shogunate in the Edo period. Even today, the downtown area shows the influence of its past existence as a residence of samurai and merchants. Following the Meiji restoration, the area was organized as part of Iwafune District, Niigata, and the town of Murakami was established with the establishment of the modern municipalities system on April 1, 1889. Murakami was raised to city status on March 31, 1954. On April 1, 2008, the towns of Arakawa and Sanpoku and the villages of Asahi and Kamihayashi (all from Iwafune District) were merged into Murakami.

== Government ==
Murakami has a mayor-council form of government with a directly elected mayor and a unicameral city legislature of 26 members. Murakami, collectively with the villages of Sekikawa and Awashimaura contributes two members to the Niigata Prefectural Assembly. In terms of national politics, the city is part of Niigata 3rd district of the lower house of the Diet of Japan.

== Education ==
Murakami has 21 public elementary schools and seven public middle schools operated by the city government. There is one public middle school and three public high schools operated by the Niigata Prefectural Board of Education. The prefecture also operates one special education school.

== Transportation ==
=== Railway ===
JR East - Uetsu Main Line

- Sakamachi - Hirabayashi - Iwafunemachi - Murakami - Majima - Echigo-Hayakawa - Kuwagawa - Imagawa - Echigo-Kangawa - Gatsugi - Fuya

JR East - Yonesaka Line

- Sakamachi

=== Highway ===
- Nihonkai-Tōhoku Expressway – Kamihayashi-Iwafune IC, Murakami-Senami Onsen IC, Murakami-Yamaberi IC, Asahi-Miomote IC, Asahi-Mahoroba IC
- National Route 7
- National Route 113
- National Route 290
- National Route 345

== Sister cities ==
- Sabae, Fukui Prefecture, Japan

== Local attractions ==
Famous products of Murakami are tea (Murakami is the northernmost tea-growing spot in Japan), salmon, and Murakami beef. The city is also a tourist spot because of famous Senami Onsen and as a jumping off point to Awashima Island.

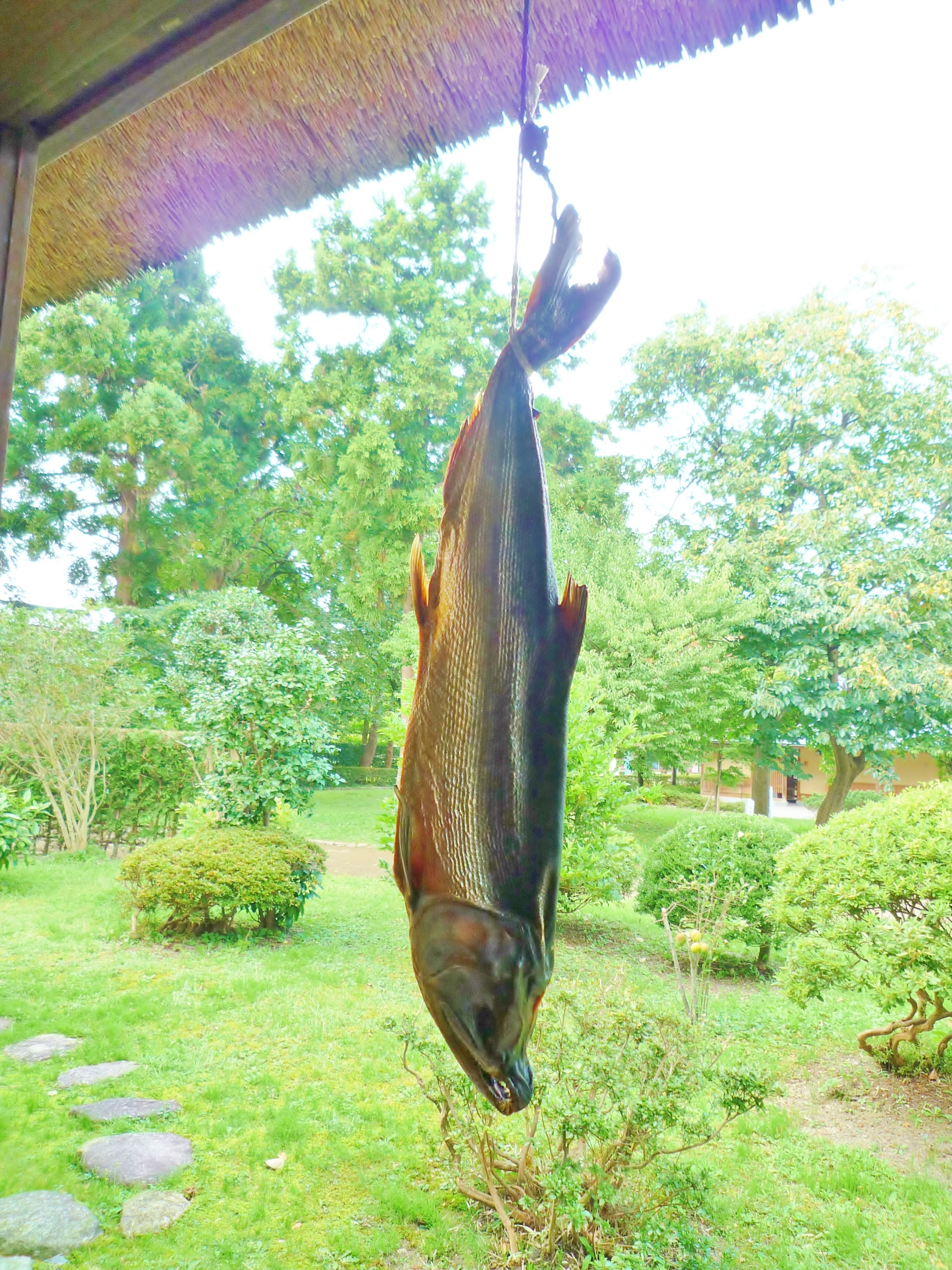
Salmon in Murakami

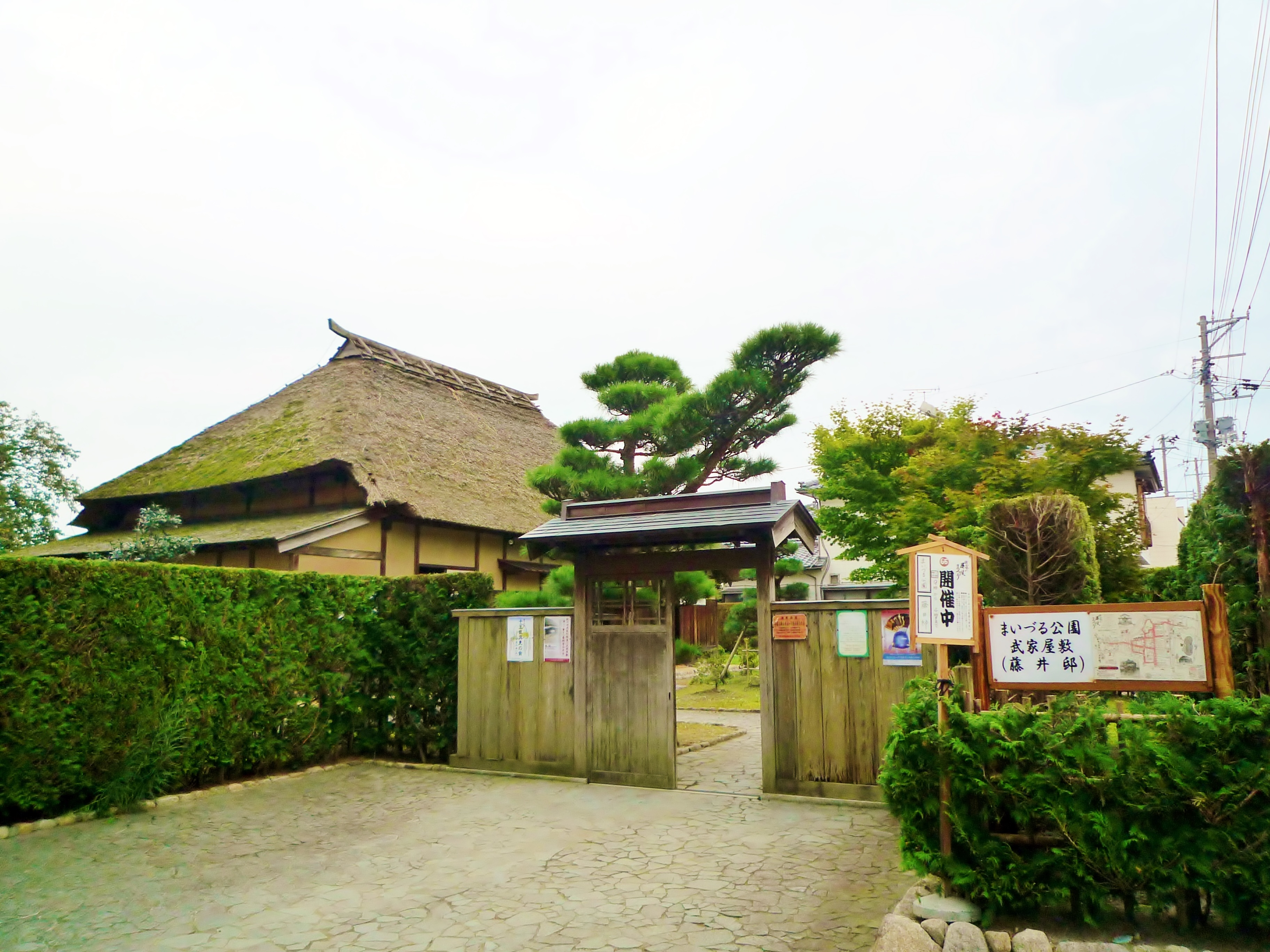
Samurai residence

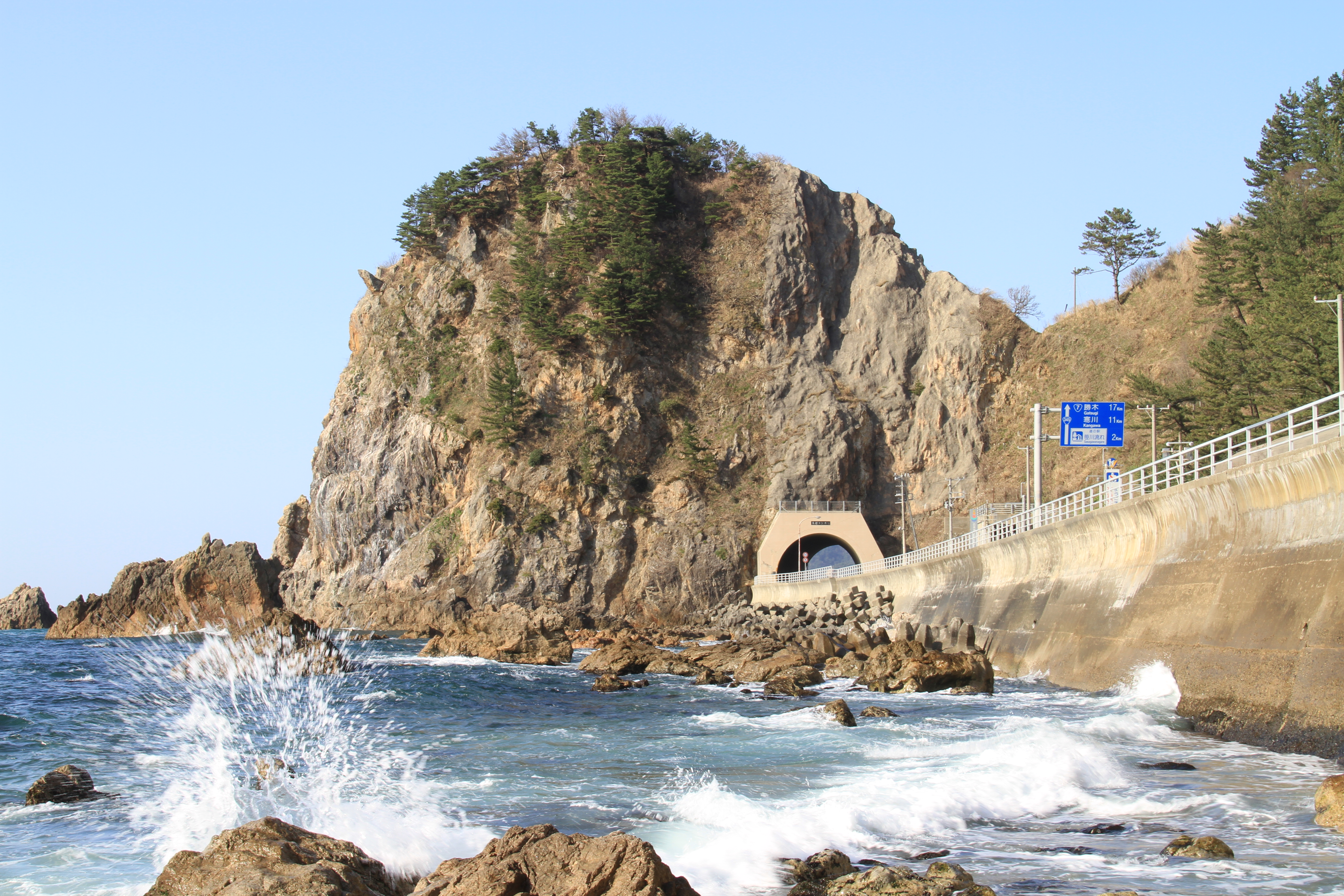
Sasagawa-nagare

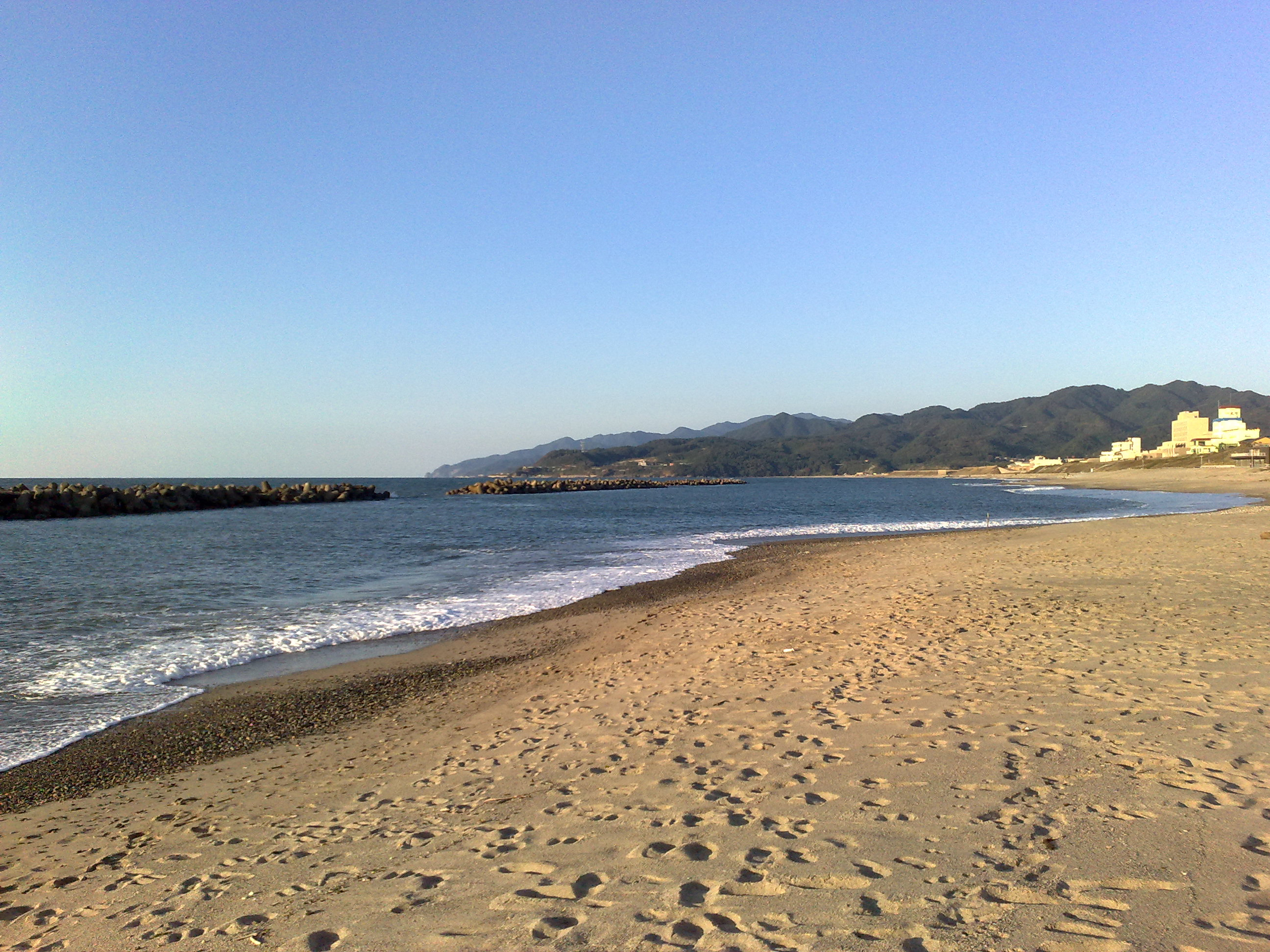
Senami Beach

=== National Historic Sites ===
- Hirabayashi Castle ruins
- Murakami Castle ruins
- Yamamoto Site

=== Festivals ===
Murakami Taisai, a traditional regional festival, has been held in the downtown area on July 6 and 7, annually, since 1868.
