= Iwafune District, Niigata =

District in Niigata prefecture, Japan

Coordinates: 38.061°N 139.60°E

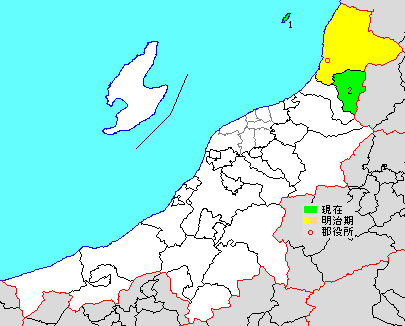
Map showing original extent of Iwafune District in Niigata Prefecture: * yellow - areas formerly within the district borders during the early Meiji period * green - current borders: 1. Awashimaura-mura; 2. Sekikawa-mura

Iwafune (岩船郡, Iwafune-gun) is a district located in Niigata Prefecture, Japan.

As of July 1, 2019, the district has an estimated population of 5,644 with a density of 18.2 persons per km^{2}. The total area is 309.39 km^{2}.

== Municipalities ==
The district consists of two villages:

- Awashimaura (Note: Classified as a village.)
- Sekikawa

== History ==
Iwafune's name is from the Ancient Japanese Ritsuryo System. In 1878, when Iwafune District launched, the district covered all six towns listed above and the current city of Murakami, and the district areas has been the same since the founding. The district seat was located at Murakami-Honmachi (now part of the current city of Murakami).

After the district lost Murakami in 1954, the district areas remain the same as until April 1, 2008. There had been some talks to merge with the city of Murakami but the city of Murakami killed the merger because of the city's new name. However, the talks was finally settled.

=== Recent mergers ===
- On April 1, 2008 - The towns of Sanpoku and Arakawa, and the villages of Asahi and Kamihayashi were merged into the expanded city of Murakami.
