= Iwafunemachi Station =

Railway station in Murakami, Niigata Prefecture, Japan

Iwafunemachi Station 岩船町駅
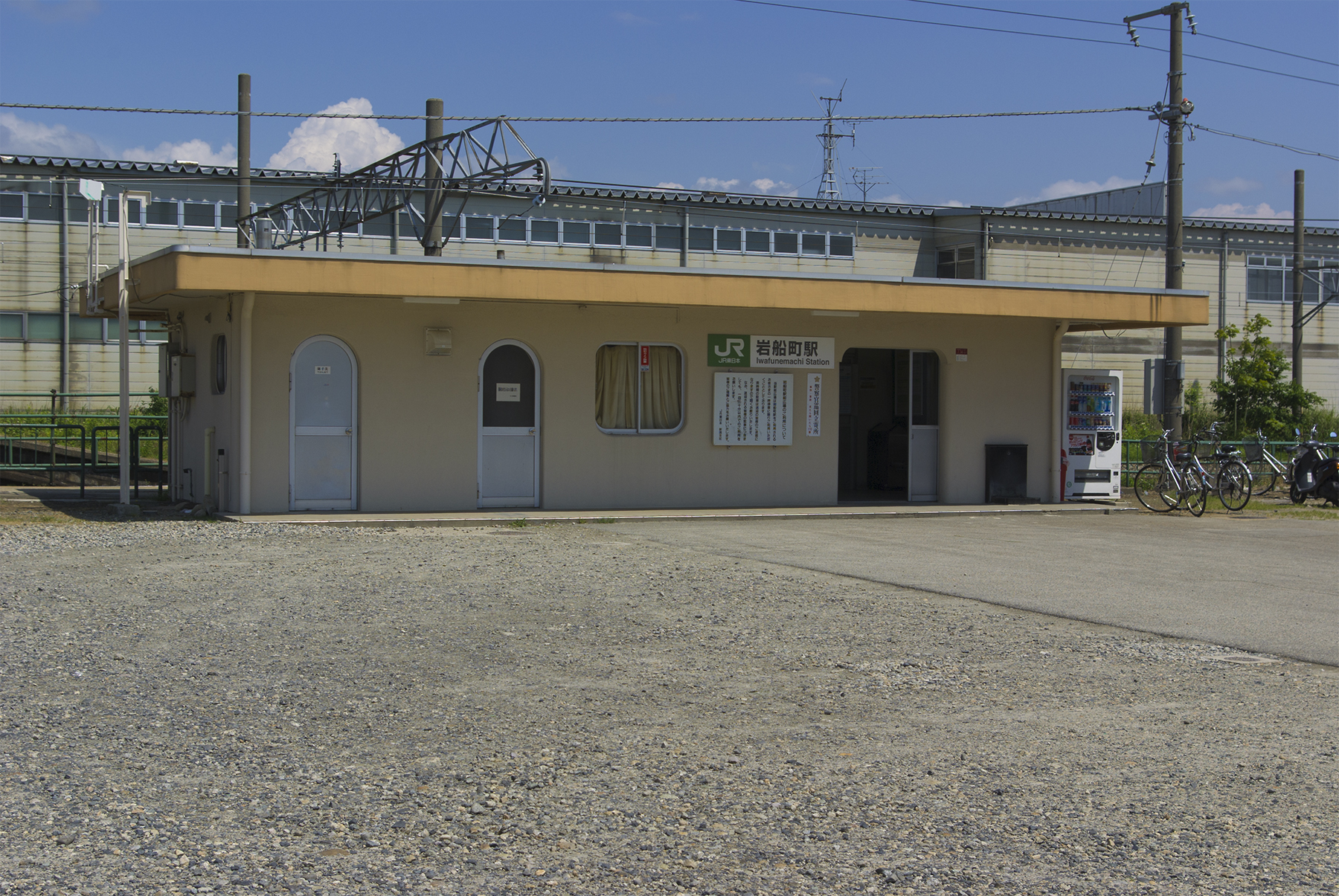
- Iwafunemachi Station in June 2010

General information
- Location: Kokuchigawa, Murakami-shi, Niigata-ken 959-2026; Japan
- Coordinates: 38°10′57.45″N 139°27′33.95″E
- Operator: JR East
- Line: ■ Uetsu Main Line
- Distance: 55.2 km from Niitsu
- Platforms: 1 island platform
- Tracks: 2

Other information
- Website: Official website

History
- Opened: 1 November 1914
- Rebuilt: 1980

Services
Preceding station	JR East	Following station
Hirabayashi towards Niitsu	Uetsu Main Line	Murakami towards Akita
Location
- Location within Japan

Iwafunemachi Station (岩船町駅, Iwafunemachi eki) is a railway station in the city of Murakami, Niigata, Japan, operated by East Japan Railway Company (JR East).

== Lines ==
Iwafunemachi Station is served by the Uetsu Main Line, and is 55.2 kilometers from the starting point of the line at Niitsu Station.

== Station layout ==
The station consists of one island platform connected to the station building by a footbridge. The station is unattended.

=== Platforms ===
1	■ Uetsu Main Line	for Murakami
2	■ Uetsu Main Line	for Murakami and Niitsu

== History ==
Iwafunemachi Station opened on 1 November 1914. A new station building was completed in 1980. With the privatization of Japanese National Railways (JNR) on 1 April 1987, the station came under the control of JR East.

== Surrounding area ==
- National Route 7
- former Kamihayashi village hall
- Kamihayashi post Office

== See also ==
- List of railway stations in Japan
