= Hirabayashi Station (Niigata) =

Railway station in Murakami, Niigata Prefecture, Japan

Hirabayashi Station 平林駅
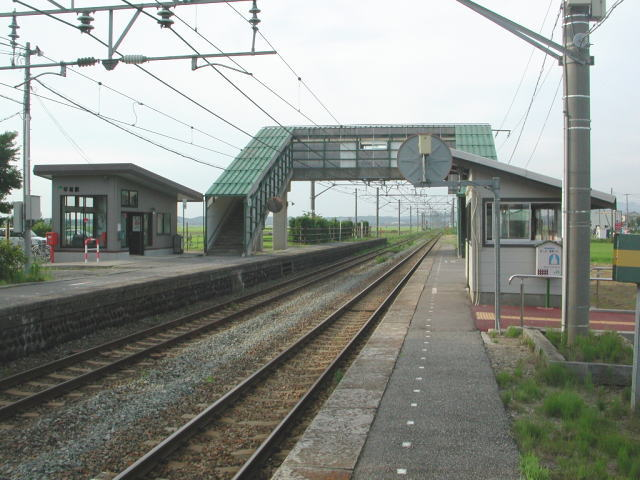
- Hirabayashi Station, August 2004

General information
- Location: Yazuta, Murakami-shi, Niigata-ken 959-2026; Japan
- Coordinates: 38°09′0.3″N 139°27′32.5″E
- Operator: JR East
- Line: ■ Uetsu Main Line
- Distance: 71.4 km from Niitsu
- Platforms: 2 side platforms
- Tracks: 2

Other information
- Status: Unstaffed
- Website: Official website

History
- Opened: 15 May 1952

Services
Preceding station	JR East	Following station
Sakamachi towards Niitsu	Uetsu Main Line	Iwafunemachi towards Akita
Location
- Location within Japan

Hirabayashi Station (平林駅, Hirabayashi eki) is a railway station in the city of Murakami, Niigata, Japan, operated by East Japan Railway Company (JR East).

== Lines ==
Murakami Station is served by the Uetsu Main Line, and is 51.6 kilometers from the starting point of the line at Niitsu Station.

== Station layout ==
The station consists of two ground-level opposed side platforms connected by a footbridge. The station is unattended.

=== Platforms ===
1	■ Uetsu Main Line	for Murakami
2	■ Uetsu Main Line	for Niigata and Niitsu

== History ==
Hirabayashi Station opened on 15 May 1952. With the privatization of Japanese National Railways (JNR) on 1 April 1987, the station came under the control of JR East.

== Surrounding area ==
- National Route 7
- Hirabayashi Post Office

== See also ==
- List of railway stations in Japan
