= Awashimaura =

Awashimaura 粟島浦村
- Village
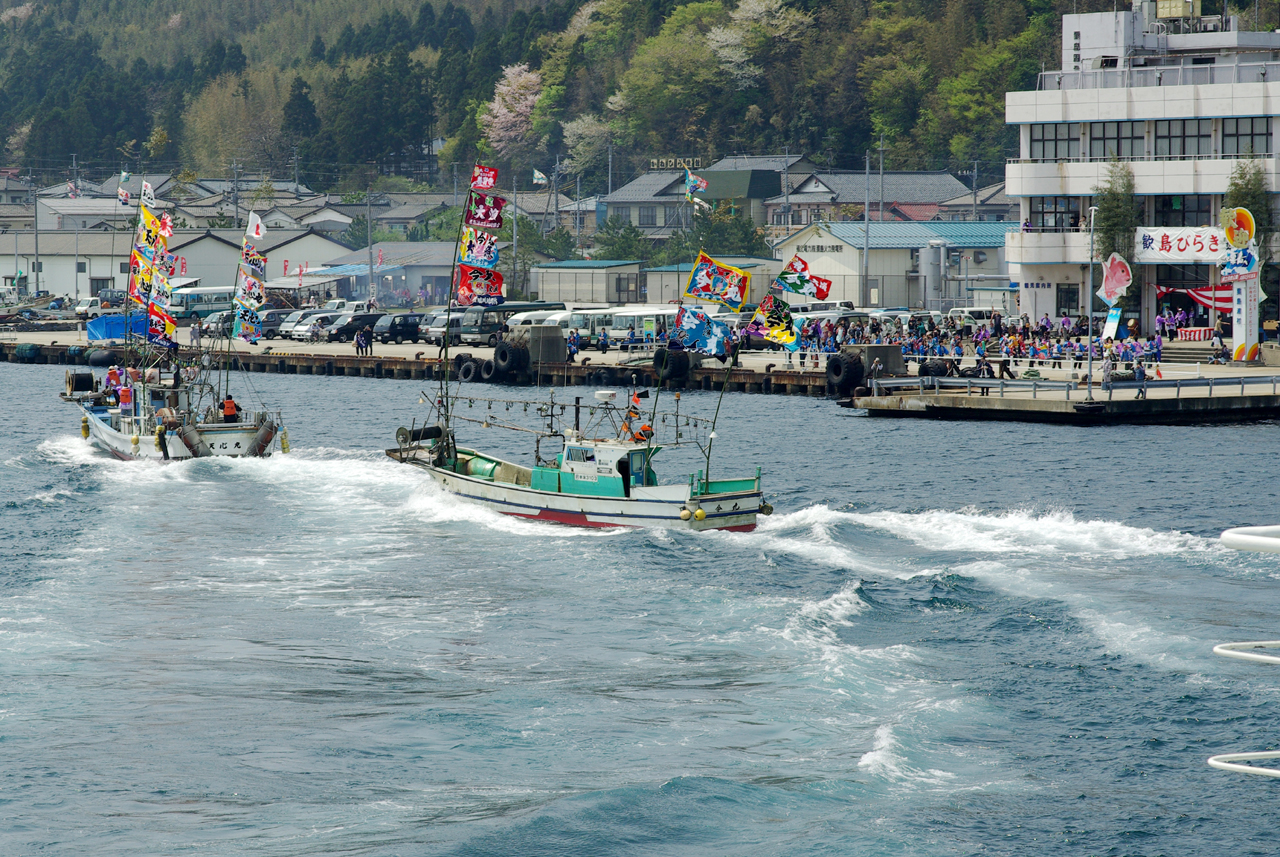
- Uchiura Harbor

- Flag Seal

- Location of Awashimaura in Niigata Prefecture

- Coordinates: 38°28′5.9″N 139°15′15.8″E
- Country: Japan
- Region: Chūbu (Kōshin'etsu) (Hokuriku)
- Prefecture: Niigata
- District: Iwafune

Area
  - Total: 9.78 km^{2} (3.78 sq mi)

Population (July 1, 2019)
  - Total: 353
  - Density: 36.1/km^{2} (93.5/sq mi)
- Time zone: UTC+9 (Japan Standard Time)
- Phone number: 0254-55-2111
- Address: 1513-11 Hinomiyama, Awashimaura-mura, Iwafune-gun, Niigata-ken 959-3265
- Climate: Cfa
- Website: Official website
- Symbols
- Flower: Lilium maculatum
- Tree: Machilus

Aerial video of Awashima Island in summer

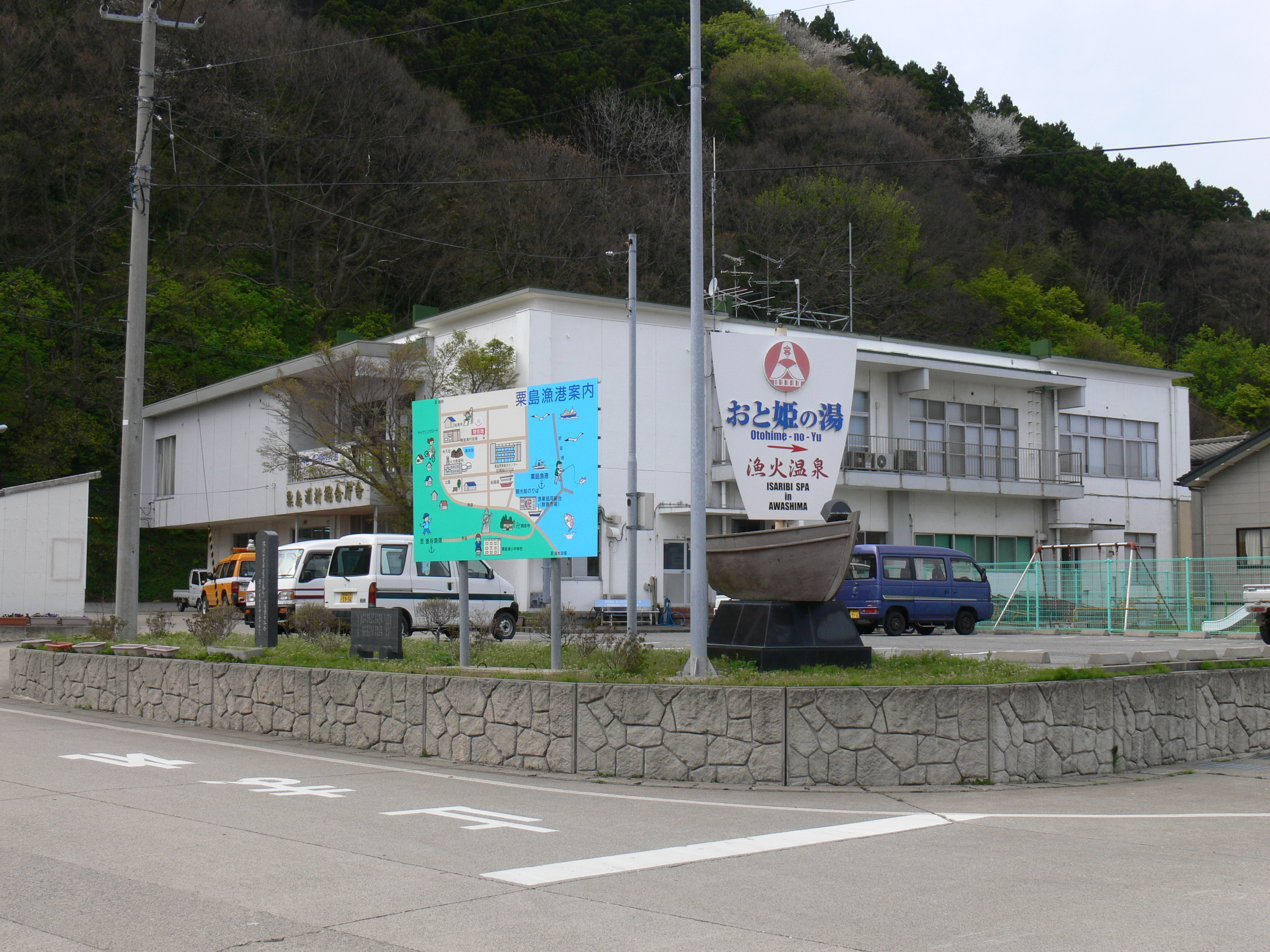
Awashimaura village hall

Awashimaura (粟島浦村, Awashimaura-mura) is a village located in Niigata Prefecture, Japan. As of 1 July 2019, the village had an estimated population of 353, and a population density of 36.1 persons per km^{2}. The total area of the village is 9.78 square kilometres (3.78 sq mi).

== Geography ==
The village is located on Awashima Island, located in the Sea of Japan off the coast of Murakami, Niigata, to which it is connected by ferry.

=== Climate ===
Awashimaura has a humid subtropical climate (Köppen Cfa) characterized by warm, wet summers and cold winters with heavy snowfall. The average annual temperature in Awashimaura is 12.0 °C. The average annual rainfall is 2059 mm with September as the wettest month. The temperatures are highest on average in August, at around 25.1 °C, and lowest in January, at around 0.5 °C.

Climate data for Awashima (1991−2020 normals, extremes 1978−present)
Month	Jan	Feb	Mar	Apr	May	Jun	Jul	Aug	Sep	Oct	Nov	Dec	Year
Record high °C (°F)	13.7 (56.7)	18.8 (65.8)	20.2 (68.4)	26.6 (79.9)	29.6 (85.3)	31.8 (89.2)	36.0 (96.8)	37.0 (98.6)	36.5 (97.7)	29.6 (85.3)	23.3 (73.9)	18.7 (65.7)	37.0 (98.6)
Mean daily maximum °C (°F)	5.5 (41.9)	5.8 (42.4)	9.1 (48.4)	14.5 (58.1)	19.7 (67.5)	23.5 (74.3)	27.1 (80.8)	29.3 (84.7)	25.6 (78.1)	20.0 (68.0)	14.2 (57.6)	8.7 (47.7)	16.9 (62.5)
Daily mean °C (°F)	3.1 (37.6)	3.0 (37.4)	5.6 (42.1)	10.3 (50.5)	15.4 (59.7)	19.6 (67.3)	23.6 (74.5)	25.5 (77.9)	22.0 (71.6)	16.5 (61.7)	11.0 (51.8)	5.9 (42.6)	13.5 (56.2)
Mean daily minimum °C (°F)	0.5 (32.9)	0.2 (32.4)	2.1 (35.8)	6.3 (43.3)	11.5 (52.7)	16.3 (61.3)	20.9 (69.6)	22.4 (72.3)	18.7 (65.7)	12.9 (55.2)	7.6 (45.7)	3.0 (37.4)	10.2 (50.4)
Record low °C (°F)	−5.8 (21.6)	−6.8 (19.8)	−3.2 (26.2)	−0.8 (30.6)	3.9 (39.0)	9.5 (49.1)	12.8 (55.0)	16.1 (61.0)	10.5 (50.9)	5.9 (42.6)	−0.6 (30.9)	−4.3 (24.3)	−6.8 (19.8)
Average precipitation mm (inches)	138.2 (5.44)	92.4 (3.64)	93.3 (3.67)	85.6 (3.37)	95.5 (3.76)	111.8 (4.40)	190.0 (7.48)	154.7 (6.09)	156.1 (6.15)	155.3 (6.11)	156.1 (6.15)	170.5 (6.71)	1,602.8 (63.10)
Average precipitation days (≥ 1.0 mm)	23.5	18.1	16.4	11.9	10.4	9.5	12.3	9.9	12.5	13.9	18.1	22.4	178.9
Mean monthly sunshine hours	52.1	75.2	140.4	195.1	222.5	203.8	183.8	226.5	169.1	145.9	91.8	53.9	1,763.1
Source: Japan Meteorological Agency

== Demographics ==
Per Japanese census data, the population of Awashimaura has declined steadily over the past 50 years.

Historical population
Year	Pop.	±%
1970	680	—
1980	595	−12.5%
1990	479	−19.5%
2000	449	−6.3%
2010	366	−18.5%
2020	353	−3.6%

== History ==
The island of Awashima has been inhabited since prehistoric times, and fragments of Jōmon period pottery have been found. The Asuka period general Abe no Hirafu conquered the island from its native Emishi inhabitants and brought it under the control of the imperial dynasty. During the Edo period, the island passed between Murakami Domain, Shōnai Domain and direct control by the Tokugawa Shogunate several times. During the Boshin War, the Schnell brothers offloaded weapons for Shōnai Domain at Awashima. After the Meiji restoration, the village of Asahimaura was created in 1909 as part of Iwafune District, Niigata Prefecture. The epicentre of the 1964 Niigata earthquake was near Awashima, and many of the buildings in Awashimaura were damaged or destroyed.

== Economy ==
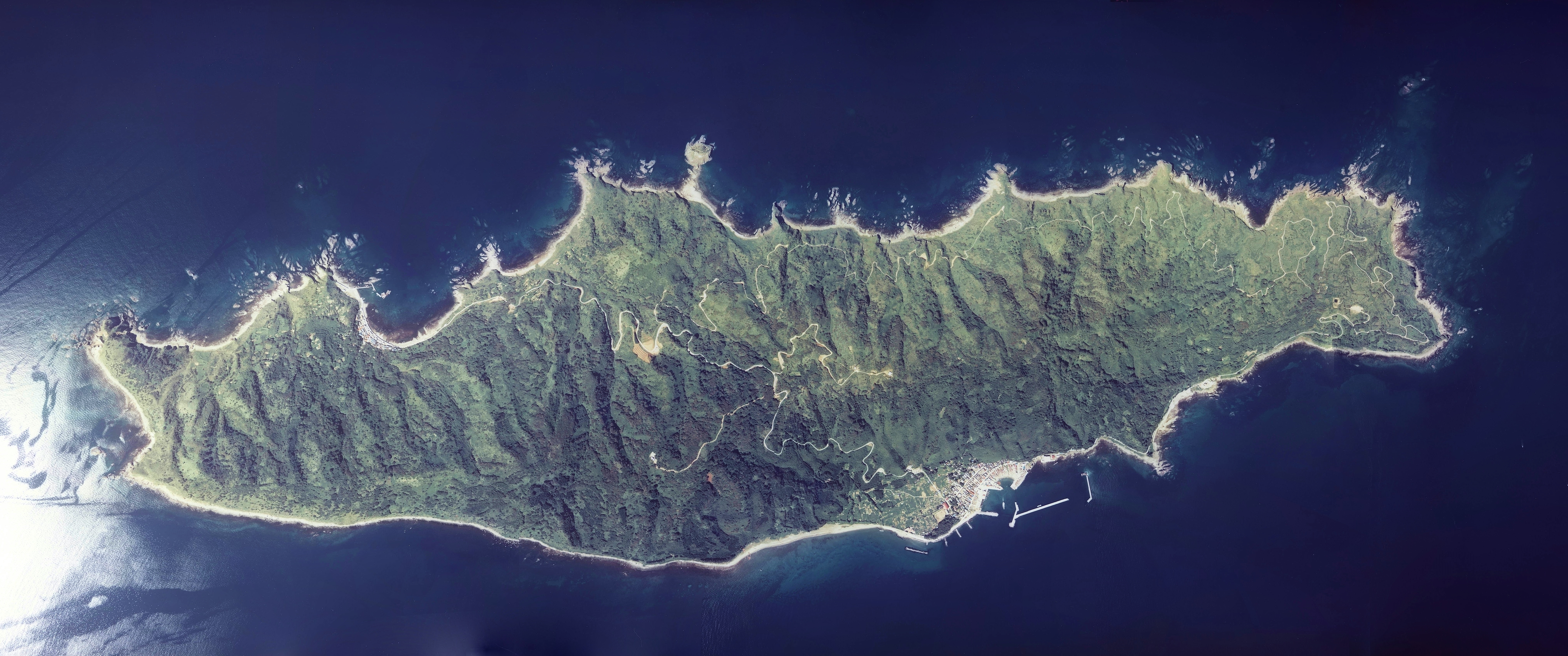
Awashima Island

The main industries of Awashimaura are seasonal tourism and commercial fishing.

== Education ==
The village has two schools, Awashimaura Village Elementary School and Awashimaura Village Junior High School. There are also programs for study abroad and visiting students.

== Transportation ==
=== Sea ===
- Awashima Kisen Ferry
  - Iwafune (Murakami) - Uchiura (Awashimaura)
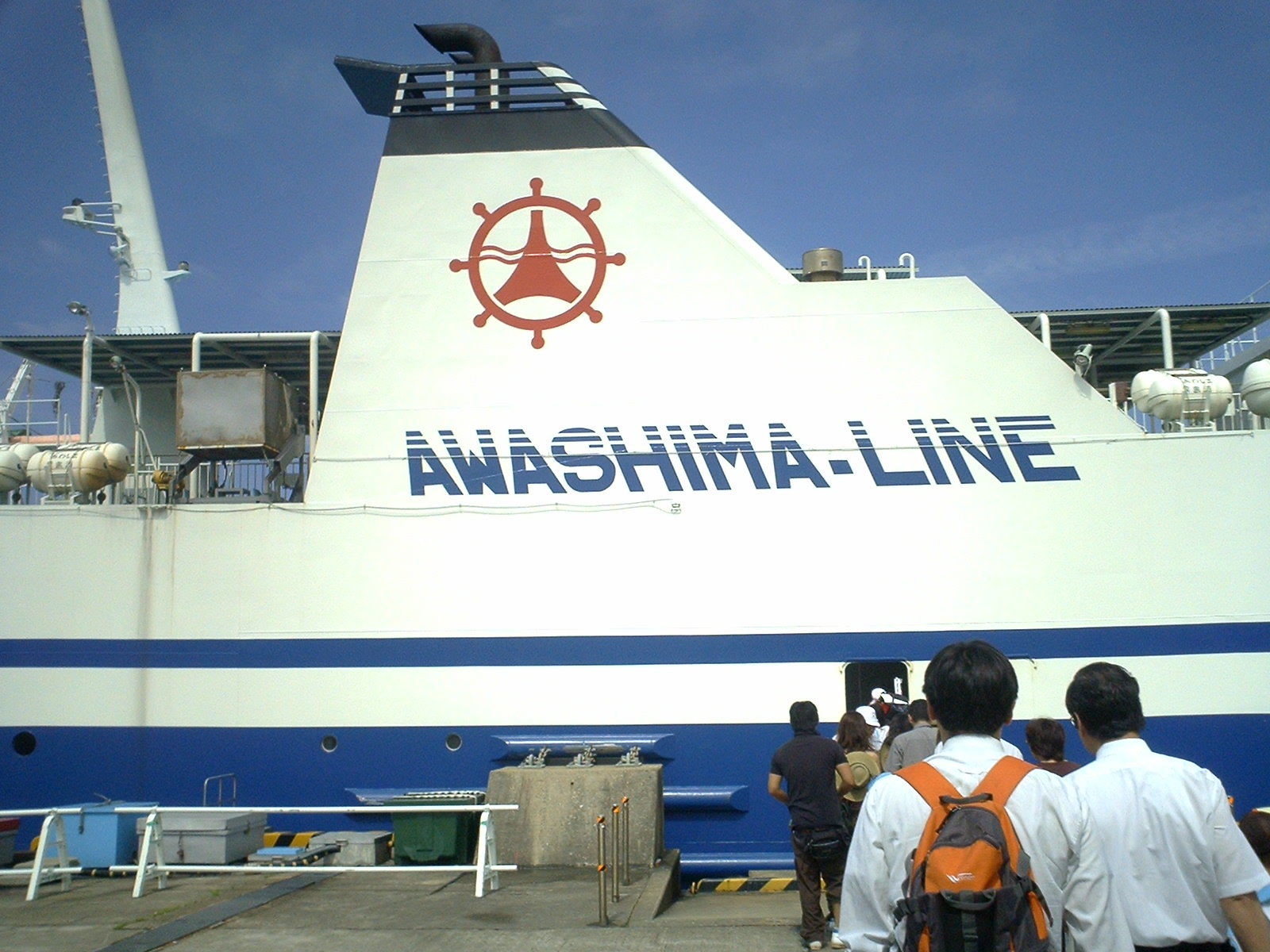
Ferry Awashima

== See also ==
- Awashima Island, Niigata
