= Chidōkan =

Chidōkan refers to four different Han schools in Edo period Japan.

- Chidōkan (Tsuruoka), the school of the Shōnai Domain
- Chidōkan (Tosa), the school of the Tosa Domain
- Chidōkan (Hiji), the school of the Hiji Domain
- Chidōkan (Ōgaki), the school of the Ōgaki Domain
