= Haguro Shrine (Yonezawa) =

Shinto shrine in Yonezawa, Yamagata prefecture, Japan

Haguro Jinja 羽黒神社
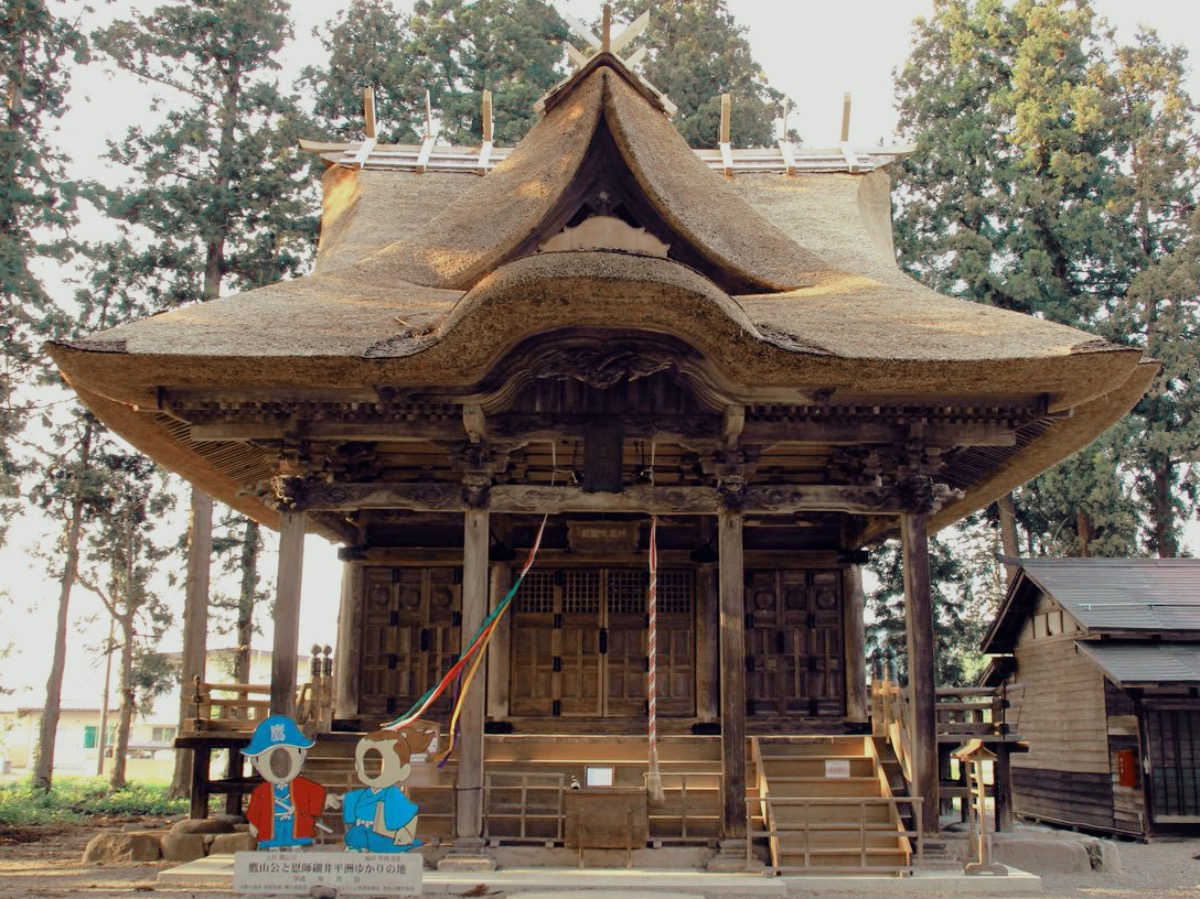
- Yonezawa Haguro Jinja Honden

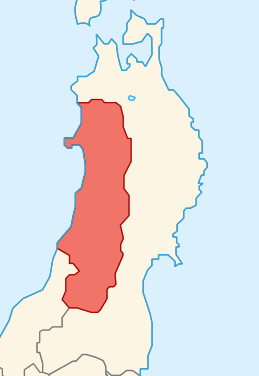
- Haguro Jinja Haguro Shrine (Yonezawa) (Dewa, Japan) Haguro Shrine (Yonezawa) (Japan)

Religion
- Affiliation: Shinto
- Deity: Three Mountains of Dewa

Location
- Location: Yonezawa, Yamagata Japan
- Coordinates: 37°52′04″N 140°08′38″E

Architecture
- Established: 806 AD

The Haguro Jinja (羽黒神社) is a Shinto shrine in the city of Yonezawa, Yamagata Prefecture, Japan. It is one of many shrines in the region dedicated to the kami of the Dewa Sanzan.

== History ==
The Yonezawa Haguro Jinja claims to have been founded in the Daidō era (806 AD), but there are no reliable historical records from that time. Originally known as the Haguro Daigongen, the shrine was relocated to the current location in 1238. It was destroyed by the Date clan in 1570 during the Battle of Yokodanbara. After Naoe Kanetsugu became castellan of Yonezawa Castle in 1598, the shrine was rebuilt. It was destroyed by a fire in 1738, and the main shrine was rebuilt in 1788. The honden is a large three by three bay irimoya-zukuri building with a complex thatch roof. The shrine complex retains some traces of when it was associated with Buddhism under the Ryōbu Shintō philosophy, including a Niomon gate. After the Meiji restoration, it was called the Omonoimino Shrine in 1875, and was renamed Haguro Shrine in 1952.

== Uesugi Harunori Teaching Site ==
The Haguro Jinja is the location where the 9th daimyō of Yonezawa Domain, Uesugi Harunori welcomed his teacher, Hosoi Heishu, to Yonezawa in 1796. Uesugi Harunori was famed for his fiscal reforms of the near bankrupt finances of Yonezawa, and was upheld by the Tokugawa shogunate as an example of good domain government. Hosoi Heishu was a noted Confucian scholar whose focus on the economic conditions of the common people won him many disciples, including Uesugi Harunori, who used Hosoi as an advisor during his reform programs. On his arrival in Yonezawa, Hosoi Heishu was met by Uesugi Harunori at the Haguro Jinja, and installed at the adjacent temple of Fumon-in during his stay. Both sites were collectively designated a National Historic Site of Japan in 1937 as the Uesugi Harunori Teaching Site (上杉治憲敬師郊迎跡) .

This shrine is located 400 meters northwest of Sekine Station on the Ōu Main Line.

== See also ==
- List of Historic Sites of Japan (Yamagata)
