= Yonezawa Uesugi clan cemetery =

Cemetery in Yamagata Prefecture, Japan

Yonezawa Domain Uesugi clan cemetery
- 米沢藩主上杉家墓所
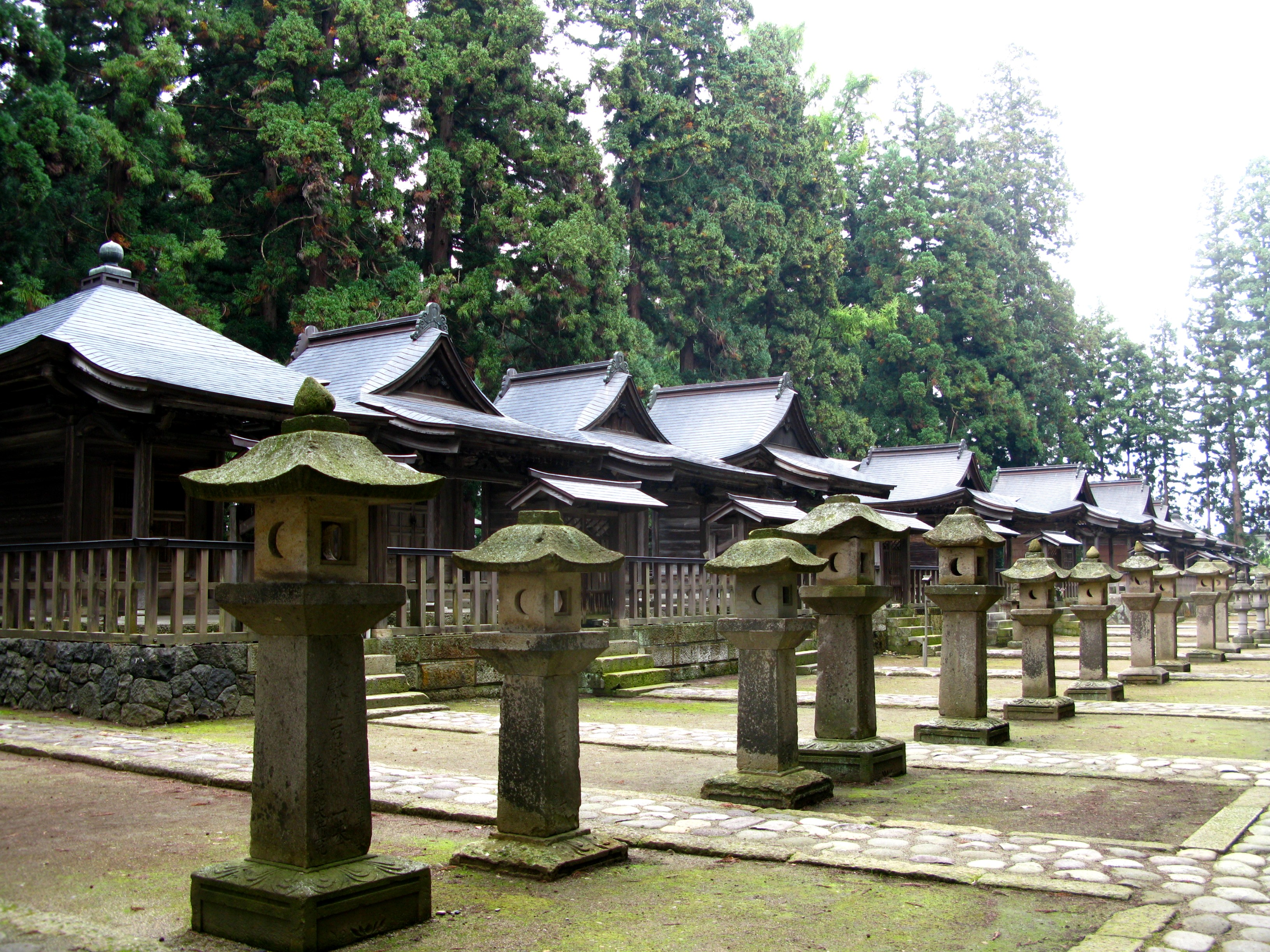
- Uesugi clan cemetery
- Interactive map of Yonezawa Domain Uesugi clan cemetery

Details
- Established: 1623
- Location: Yonezawa, Yamagata
- Country: Japan
- Coordinates: 37°54′53″N 140°05′29″E
- Type: daimyō cemetery
- Website: Official website
- Footnotes: National Historic Site of Japan

The Yonezawa Domain Uesugi clan cemetery (米沢藩主上杉家墓所, Yonezawa-han-shu Uesugi-ke bosho) is located in the city of Yonezawa, Yamagata. The cemetery contains the graves of the successive daimyō of Yonezawa Domain over a 390-year period, each housed in its own memorial wooden chapel. The cemetery was designated a National Historic Site in 1984.

== Overview ==
During the Sengoku period, the powerful Uesugi clan ruled Echigo Province as virtually independent warlords. Forced eventually to submit to Toyotomi Hideyoshi, they were transferred to a vast domain centered at Aizu with a kokudaka of 1.2 million koku. However, as the Uesugi opposed Tokugawa Ieyasu in the Sekigahara Campaign, they were declared ‘’tozama daimyō’’ (outsider lords) under the new Tokugawa shogunate. Their territory was reduced to Yonezawa Basin and area straddling the border between Dewa Province and Mutsu Province with a kokudaka of only 300,000 koku. They rebuilt the ancient Yonezawa Castle, where they ruled to the Meiji restoration. The clan cemetery contains the graves and memorial chapels of the first daimyō of Yonezawa, Uesugi Kagekatsu through the 11th daimyō, Uesugi Masatada.

The cemetery is located to the northwest of Yonezawa Castle. It is surrounded by a moat, as it was intended to be a secondary fortification should the castle come under attack. The cemetery contains over 1000 votive Tōrō stone lanterns, donated by vassals over the years, and many cryptomeria trees, some of which are over 400 years old. Prior to the Meiji period, the chapel of Uesugi Kagetora was located in the center, with the graves of odd generations of daimyō to the right and even generations to the left. The second through eighth generations were cremated, but the ninth through twelfth generations were burials. The cemetery does not contain the grave of the 13th daimyō Uesugi Narinori, who was buried in Tokyo; however, it does also contain the remains of Uesugi Akitaka, the son of the 10th daimyō, Uesugi Haruhiro, who is buried with his father.

The remains of Uesugi Kenshin were relocated from Aizuwakamatsu Castle to Yonezawa Castle on the foundation of Yonezawa Domain, were not located at this cemetery. However, in 1876, a memorial chapel to house the remains of Uesugi Kenshin was constructed between the graves of Uesugi Kagekatsu and the 3rd daimyō, Uesugi Sadakatsu. Further, a commemorative monument was erected in 1919 to Uesugi Mochinori, the 14th (and final) daimyō of Yonezawa between the graves of Uesugi Kagekatsu and the 4th daimyō, Uesugi Tsunanori.

The cemetery is under the management of Hōon-ji (法音寺), a Buddhist temple belonging to the Shingon-shu Buzan-ha. This temple claims to have been founded in Echigo Province in 737 AD by order of Emperor Shōmu and to have been transferred to Kasugayama Castle by Uesugi Kenshin, and again to Yonezawa Castle by Uesugi Kagekatsu. It was responsible for memorial services held within the castle to Uesugi Kenshin, but after the Meiji restoration, it was relocated to the site of the Uesugi Cemetery.

The cemetery is located about 10 minutes on foot from Nishi-Yonezawa Station on the JR East Yonesaka Line.

== See also ==
- List of Historic Sites of Japan (Yamagata)
