= Tateyama Castle (Yonezawa) =

Sengoku period castle ruins in Yonezawa, Dewa, Japan

- 舘山城
- Yonezawa, Yamagata Prefecture, Japan
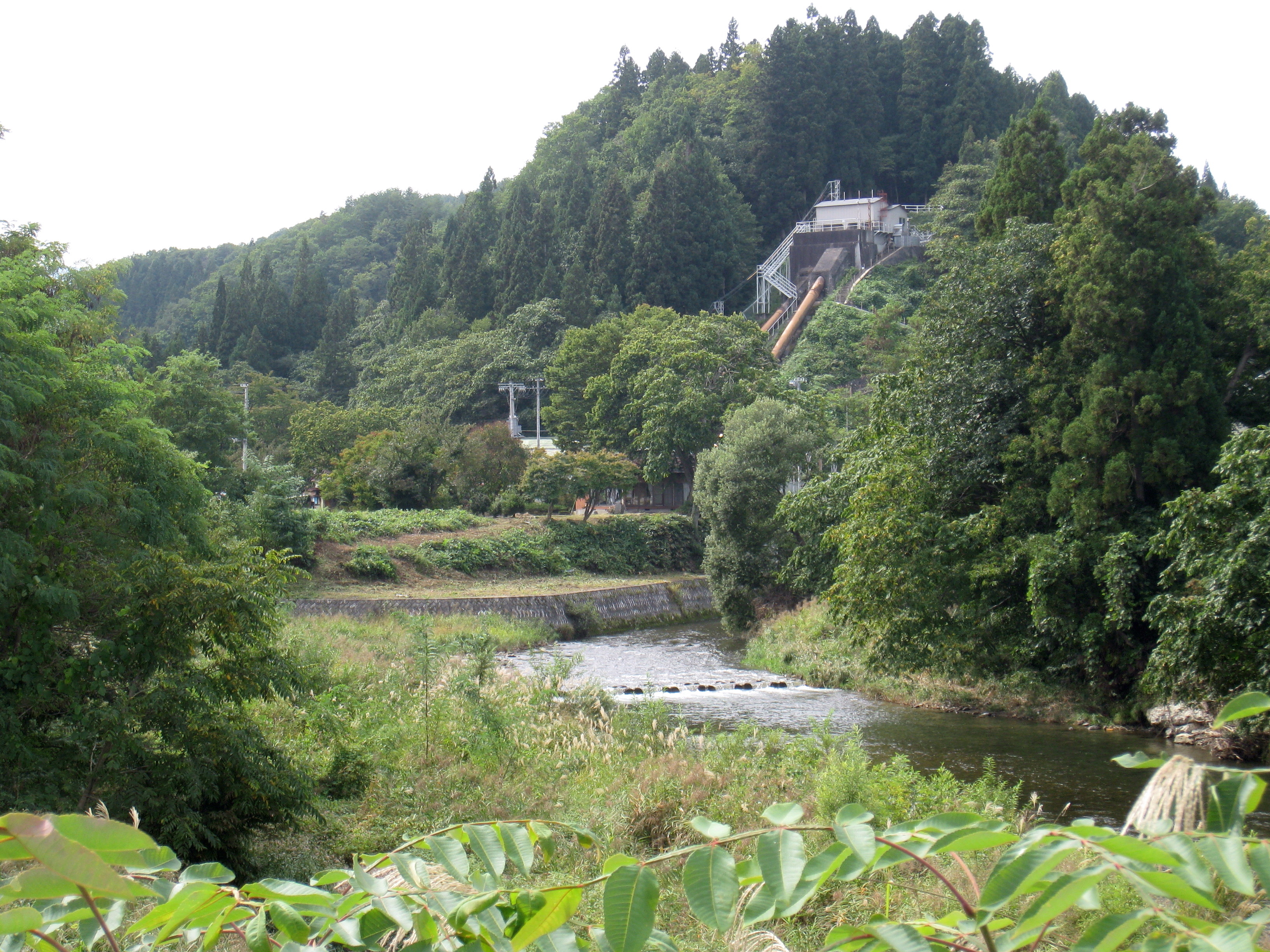
- Yonezawa-Tateyama castle ruins

Site information
- Type: hilltop-style Japanese castle
- Open to the public: yes
- Condition: ruins

Location
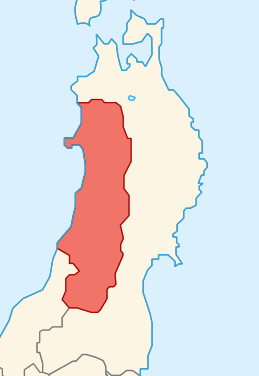
- Tateyama Castle Tateyama Castle (Dewa, Japan) Tateyama Castle (Japan)
- Coordinates: 37°54′43″N 140°03′46″E

Site history
- Built: Kamakura period
- In use: Sengoku period
- Demolished: 1615

Tateyama Castle (舘山城, Tateyama-jō) was a Sengoku period Japanese castle located in what is now the city of Yonezawa, southern Yamagata Prefecture, Japan. The site of the castle was designated a National Historic Site in 2016. The castle grounds are a 20 minutes walk from Nishi-Yonezawa Station on the JR East Yonesaka Line. It should not be confused with Tateyama Castle in Tateyama, Chiba, whose name is written with slightly different kanji.

== Situation ==
Tateyama Castle is located on a small hill in the southwestern corner of the Yonezawa Basin of ancient Dewa Province. The Yonezawa Basin measures approximately 30 by 10 kilometers and is surrounded by mountains on all sides making it a natural fortress. The castle location is also at the confluence of the Omono River and the Otaru River in the upper watershed of the Mogami River, which also add to its natural defenses. The location is on the route to mountain passes to the Aizu region.

The main bailey area is roughly triangular-shaped, with a length of 100 meters and maximum width of 50 meters, extending east-west. The western line of this triangle was protected by an earthen rampart, 10 meters wide by five meters high, faced with stone. At the northern edge of this wall was the main gate, which was a Masugata-style gate, also faced with stone walls. The secondary bailey was a square enclosure 50 meters long, which was also protected by the earthen rampart on its western side, and dry moats. Surrounding these areas were many smaller enclosures, fortified by earthen ramparts, dry moats and watch towers, which served as the fortified residences of senior retainers.

== History ==
Ōe no Hiromoto was one of Minamoto no Yoritomo's senior councilors, and was awarded a shōen in Dewa Province, which he gave to one of his younger sons. This son changed his name to "Nagai" after the name of the shōen. The origins of Tateyama Castle are uncertain, but it appears to have been constructed by the Nagai clan during the Kamakura period. The Nagai also built Yonezawa Castle, which was four kilometers east of Tateyama Castle as their administrative center. During the Nanboku-chō period, the Nagai supported the Northern Court, whereas the aggressive Date clan in the adjacent Fukushima Basin supported the Southern Court. The Date invaded the Yonezawa Basin and destroyed the Nagai clan in 1385. During the Sengoku period, the Date were leaked by internal conflicts and wars with the Ashina clan and the Mogami clan, and transferred their seat from Kōri-Nishiyama Castle to Yonezawa. At this time, Tateyama Castle was repaired as a military stronghold and place of refuge in case of emergency as its location was far for defendable than that of Yonezawa Castle.

In 1584, Date Terumune turned over the chieftainship of the Date clan to his son, Date Masamune, and retired to Tateyama Castle. However, after he was assassinated by the Nihonmatsu clan later that year. In 1589, Date Masamune finally defeated the Ashina, and moved his seat from Yonezawa to Kurokawa Castle in Aizu. Tateyama Castle retained its importance due to its location guarding the mountain passes between Yonezawa and Aizu.

In 1591, after Date Masamune pledged fealty to Toyotomi Hideyoshi, he was forced to turnover both Yonezawa and Aizu to Gamō Ujisato. Ujisato ruled from Aizuwakamatsu Castle and modernized many castles around his domains, but Tateyama Castle does not appear to be one of them. Following his death in 1595, the Yonezawa portion of his territory was awarded to Uesugi Kagekatsu. After the Battle of Sekigahara and the establishment of the Tokugawa shogunate, the Uesugi clan was reduced to only its holdings in Yonezawa. The Uesugi were conservative in outlook, and rebuilt Yonezawa Castle in an almost archaic style with earthen walls; however, as they were surrounded by hostile neighbors, some effort was made to remodel Tateyama Castle with stone walls. In 1615, the Tokugawa shogunate proclaimed the "One Country - One Castle" policy and forbid the daimyō to keep multiple strongholds in their domains. The newly reconstructed stone walls of Tateyama Castle were thrown down and the castle was abandoned.

The site was excavated from 2011 to 2015 by the Yonezawa City Board of Education.

== See also ==
- List of Historic Sites of Japan (Yamagata)

== Literature ==
- Schmorleitz, Morton S. (1974). Castles in Japan. Tokyo: Charles E. Tuttle Co. pp. 144–145. ISBN 0-8048-1102-4.
- Motoo, Hinago (1986). Japanese Castles. Tokyo: Kodansha. p. 200 pages. ISBN 0-87011-766-1.
- Turnbull, Stephen (2003). Japanese Castles 1540-1640. Osprey Publishing. p. 64 pages. ISBN 1-84176-429-9.
