= Dōnomae ruins =

Archaeological site in Sakata, Tõhoku, Japan

- 堂の前遺跡 (Japanese)
- Dōnomae ruins Dōnomae ruins (Japan)
- 38°57′43″N 139°55′35″E
- Type: settlement
- Periods: Heian period
- Location: Sakata, Yamagata, Japan
- Region: Tōhoku region

Site notes
- Elevation: 15 m (49 ft)
- Length: 265 m (869 ft)
- Width: 240 m (790 ft)
- Excavation dates: 1962-1964
- Discovered: 1955
- Public access: Yes (no facilities)

The Dōnomae ruins (堂の前遺跡, Dōnomae iseki) is an archaeological site containing the ruins of a Heian period fortified settlement located in what is now part of the city of Sakata, Yamagata in the Tōhoku region of Japan. The site was designated a National Historic Site of Japan in 1979.

== Overview ==
The site is located on the left bank of the Arase River near its confluence with the Hyuga River, approximately 8 kilometers northeast of Sakata Station at an altitude of approximately 15 meters, and is covered completely by rice paddies. It is 1.5 kilometers east of the Kinowanosaku ruins. The site was discovered in 1955 when it was noticed by farmers that a large number of artifacts were being turned up during plowing. In the first of six excavations conducted between 1962 and 1964, the ruins were found to measure 240 meter east–west by 265 meters north–south, and to have been completely surrounded by a moat. The foundations of a large gate on the south perimeter were also found. Within the compound were the foundation stones of many dozens of buildings, including a central structure whose pillars were between 30 and 50 cm in diameter, indicating a very large structure. The foundations of an inner gate were also found. The center building had a raft-foundation made of horizontally laid logs.

Excavated items included many fragments of Sue ware pottery, earthenware and red pottery pots, fragments of leather belts, iron slag and wooden boards used for divination. These items dated the site to the Heian period, around the early 10th century. It is presumed from the layout of the buildings and the location that this was once the location of the provincial capital of Dewa Province, although this attribution remains uncertain.

The site was backfilled after excavation and replanted with rice. There is nothing at the site but an explanatory plaque. It is located about 16 minutes by car from Mototate Station on the JR East Uetsu Main Line.

== See also ==
- List of Historic Sites of Japan (Yamagata)
