= Abumiya =

- 鐙屋
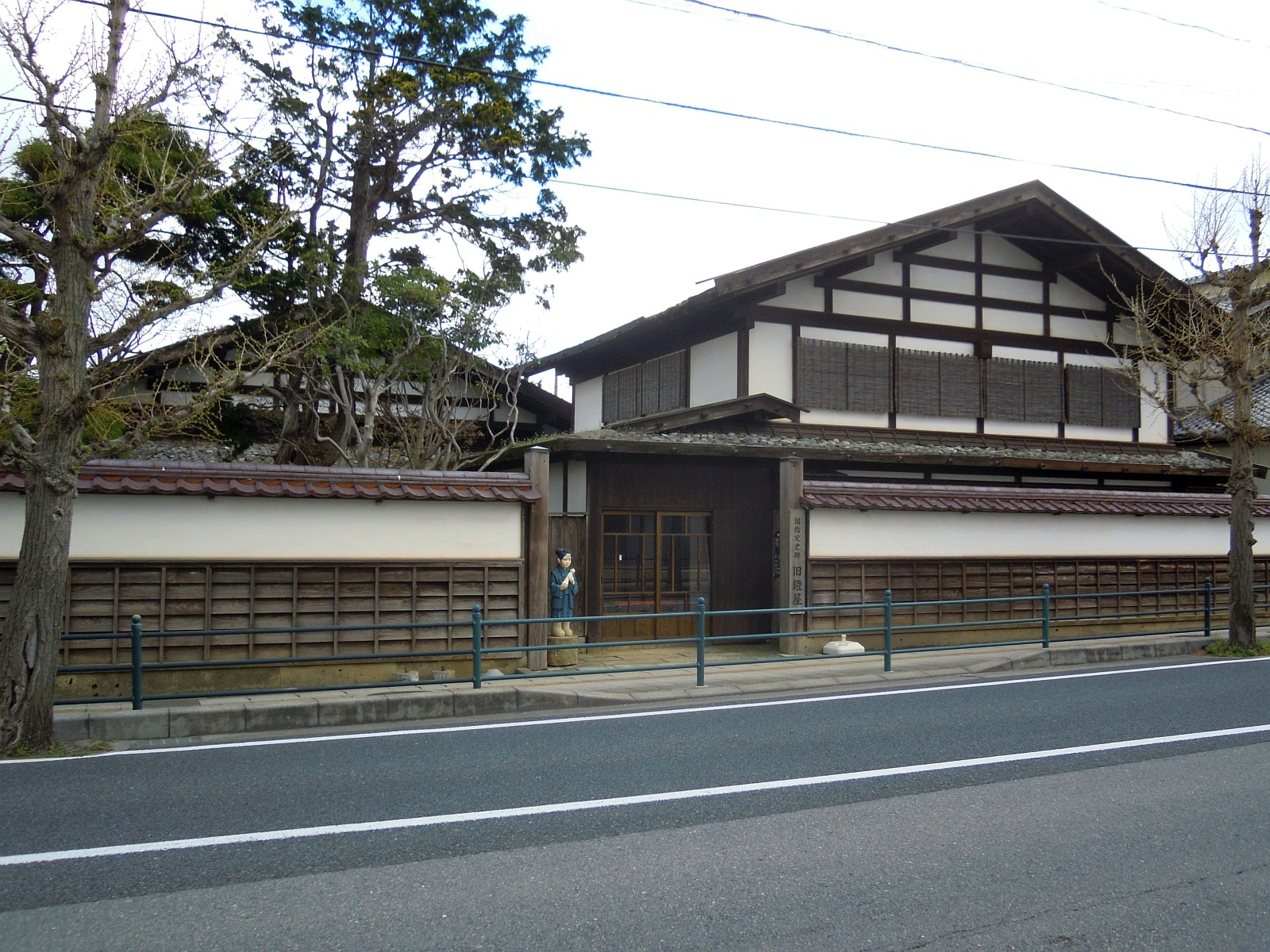

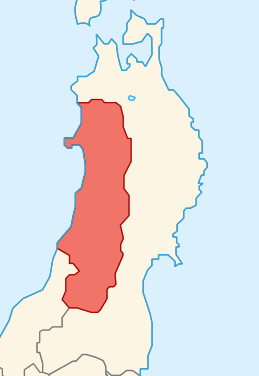
- Location within Yamagata Prefecture Location within Dewa, Japan Location within Japan

General information
- Architectural style: Machiya
- Location: Sakata, Yamagata, Japan
- Coordinates: 38°54′55″N 139°50′14″E
- Completed: 1845
- Renovated: 1990-1998

Technical details
- Material: wooden
- Floor count: 2
- Floor area: 500 m²

The Abumiya (鐙屋) is an Edo period Machiya (merchant-class residence) located in the city of Sakata, Yamagata in the Tōhoku region of northern Japan. The site was designated a National Historic Site of Japan in 1984.

== Overview ==
The Abumiya residence is a surviving example of a typical large townhouse with an attached warehouse, many of which once existed in Edo-period Sakata. The Abumiya was owned by the Tawariya, one of the 36 chartered merchant families in Sakata who controlled the kitamaebune trade with Osaka and western Japan via the Sea of Japan and Seto Inland Sea, and who were active in the civic life of the city. The building is a wooden structure with a Japanese cypress shingle roof, and is a rare survivor of a type of building which was once common in many Japanese cities.

The building was the setting for Ihara Saikaku's novel The Eternal Storehouse of Japan (日本永代蔵, Nippon Eitaigura) in 1688.

The building was reconstructed in 1845, after a large fire destroyed most of Sakata, and was further restored from 1984. It was acquired by the city of Sakata in 1986 and opened to the public as a museum after eight years of renovation in 1998. It is located about five minutes by car from Sakata Station.

== See also ==
- List of Historic Sites of Japan (Yamagata)
