= Furushida-Higashi ruins =

Heian period archaeological site in Yonezawa, Tōhoku, Japan

- 古志田東遺跡 (Japanese)
- Furushida-Higashi ruins Furushida-Higashi ruins (Japan)
- 37°53′53″N 140°05′55″E
- Type: settlement
- Periods: Heian period
- Location: Yonezawa, Yamagata, Japan
- Region: Tōhoku region

Site notes
- Excavation dates: 1999
- Public access: Yes (public park)
- National Historic Site of Japan

The Furushida-Higashi ruins (古志田東遺跡, Furushida-Higashi iseki) is an archaeological site containing the ruins of a large-scale Heian period residence located in what is now part of the city of Yonezawa, Yamagata in the Tōhoku region of northern Japan. The site was designated a National Historic Site of Japan in 2000.

== Overview ==
The site consists of the remains of a fortified residence built in the middle of the Heian period located in the Rinsenji neighborhood of what is now Yonezawa City. It was constructed from the latter half of the 9th century to the first half of the 10th century, during a period when the authority of the central government was in decline. The ruins consist of a square enclosure, measuring approximately 100 meters on a side, surrounded by a moat and earthen wall on the east bank of a small river flowing from south to north. In 1999, an emergency excavation survey was carried out at the time of residential land development, and the foundations pillar stones of at least seven buildings were discovered, along with a large quantity of Sue ware earthenware objects, including bowls, cups and plates, many of which had ink inscriptions. In addition, 28 wooden inventory tags were found.

The central building was a large 11 x 5 bay structure with a total floor area of approximately 320 square meters. There were three buildings adjacent to the west and north sides of this building, and another three buildings were arranged on the south and east sides a little further apart. There was an artificially constructed bay in the northwest of the central building facing the river, which may have served as a dock.

The site was backfilled after excavation and is now a public park and the location of the foundation stones of some of the buildings is marked with stone pillars. The site is about 13 minutes on foot from Minami-Yonezawa Station on the JR East Yonesaka Line.

== See also ==
- List of Historic Sites of Japan (Yamagata)
