= List of historic sites of Japan (Yamagata) =

This list is of the historic sites of Japan located within the Prefecture of Yamagata.

== National Historic Sites ==
As of 1 December 2022, thirty-one Sites have been designated as being of national significance, including the Dewa Sendai Kaidō Nakayamagoe Pass, which spans the prefectural borders with Miyagi, and Mount Chōkai, which spans the prefectural borders with Akita.

Site	Municipality	Comments	Image	Coordinates	Type	Ref.
Ichinosaka ruins 一ノ坂遺跡 Ichinosaka iseki	Yonezawa	Jōmon period settlement trace		37°54′35″N 140°04′54″E	1	324
Ichinosawa Caves 一の沢洞窟 Ichinosawa dōkutsu	Takahata	Jōmon period cave dwelling	Ichinosawa Caves	38°02′50″N 140°13′51″E	1	311
Inarimori Kofun 稲荷森古墳 Inarimori kofun	Nan'yō	Kofun period tumulus	Inarimori Kofun	38°02′23″N 140°09′26″E	1	313
Ushū Kaidō 羽州街道 Ushū kaidō	Kaminoyama	designation includes the sites of Narage-juku (楢下宿) and Kanayamagoe Pass (金山越)	Ushū Kaidō	38°05′49″N 140°18′43″E	6	325
Nobesawa Ginzan ruins 延沢銀山遺跡 Nobesawa ginzan iseki	Obanazawa	Edo period silver mine ruins	Nobesawa Ginzan ruins	38°34′15″N 140°27′57″E	6	317
Shimokomatsu Kofun Cluster 下小松古墳群 Shimokomatsu kofun-gun	Kawanishi	Kofun period tumuli	Shimokomatsu Kofun Cluster	38°01′23″N 140°02′20″E	1	3267
Hibakoiwa Caves 火箱岩洞窟 Hibakoiwa dōkutsu	Takahata	Jōmon period cave dwelling	Hibakoiwa Caves	38°03′02″N 140°12′56″E	1	314
Chidōkan 旧致道館 kyū-Chidōkan	Tsuruoka	han school	Chidōkan	38°43′35″N 139°49′34″E	4	298
Abumiya residence 旧鐙屋 Abumiya	Sakata	the Abumiya family of rice brokers are mentioned in The Japanese Family Storehouse (日本永代蔵) by Saikaku	Abumiya	38°54′55″N 139°50′14″E	4	316
Furushida-Higashi ruins 古志田東遺跡 Furushida-Higashi iseki	Yonezawa	Heian period settlement trace		37°53′53″N 140°05′55″E	1	3259
Aterazawa Tateyama Castle ruins 左沢楯山城跡 Aterazawa Tateyema-jō ato	Ōe	Sengoku period castle ruins		38°23′11″N 140°13′00″E	2	00003618
Yamagata Castle ruins 山形城跡 Yamagata-jō ato	Yamagata	Edo period castle	Yamagata Castle ruins	38°15′20″N 140°19′41″E	2	318
Yama-dera 山寺 Yama-dera	Yamagata	also a Place of Scenic Beauty; immortalized in Bashō's haiku 閑さや岩にしみ入る蝉の声 "silence, penetrating into the rocks; the voice of a cicada"; in 1996 the Ministry of the Environment selected the cicadas of Yama-dera as one of the 100 Soundscapes of Japan	Yama-dera	38°18′50″N 140°26′06″E	3	293
Oguni Castle ruins 小国城跡 Oguni-jō ato	Tsuruoka	Sengoku period castle ruins		38°34′03″N 139°37′56″E	2	3345
Matsugaoka Land Reclamation Area 松ヶ岡開墾場 Matsugaoka kaikonjō	Tsuruoka	sericulture area developed in the early Meiji period by 3,000 former samurai of the Shōnai Domain; focus of the Matsugaoka Land Reclamation Area Memorial Museum (松ヶ岡開墾記念館)	Matsugaoka Land Reclamation Area	38°42′01″N 139°53′10″E	6	322
Uesugi Harunori Teaching Site 上杉治憲敬師郊迎跡 Uesugi Harunori keishi kōgei ato	Yonezawa	at Haguro Jinja (羽黒神社)	Uesugi Harunori Teaching Site	37°52′04″N 140°08′38″E	4	295
Kinowanosaku ruins 城輪柵跡 Kinowasaku ato	Sakata	Nara to Heian period josaku-style fortification ruins	Kinowanosaku ruins	38°57′50″N 139°54′31″E	2	294
Shinjō Tozawa clan cemetery 新庄藩主戸沢家墓所 Shinjō-han-shu Tozawa-ke bosho	Shinjō	Edo period daimyō cemetery	Shinjō Tozawa clan cemetery	38°46′49″N 140°18′24″E	7	320
Nishinumata ruins 西沼田遺跡 Nishinumata iseki	Tendō	Kofun period settlement trace	Nishinumata ruins	38°21′36″N 140°20′32″E	1	319
Ōdachi Caves 大立洞窟 Ōdachi dōkutsu	Takahata	Jōmon period cave dwelling	Ōdachi Caves	38°01′16″N 140°12′29″E	1	312
Shima ruins 嶋遺跡 Shima iseki	Yamagata	Kofun period settlement trace	Shima ruins	38°17′03″N 140°19′08″E	1	305
Dōnomae ruins 堂の前遺跡 Dōnomae iseki	Sakata	Heian period fortified settlement trace		38°57′43″N 139°55′35″E	2	310
Hinata Caves 日向洞窟 Hinata dōkutsu	Takahata	Jōmon period cave dwelling	Hinata Caves	38°01′55″N 140°12′15″E	1	308
Yonezawa Uesugi clan cemetery 新庄藩主戸沢家墓所 Yonezawa-han-shu Uesugi-ke bosho	Yonezawa	Edo period daimyō cemetery	Yonezawa Uesugi clan cemetery	37°54′54″N 140°05′29″E	7	315
Mount Chōkai 鳥海山 Chōkaisan	Yuza	Holy Mountain, designation includes areas of Yurihonjō and Nikaho in Akita Prefecture	Mount Chōkai	38°59′49″N 139°56′38″E	3	00003566
Dewa Sendai Kaidō Nakayamagoe Pass 出羽仙台街道中山越 Dewa Sendai kaidō Nakayamagoe	Mogami	Ancient highway; the designation includes an area of Ōsaki in Miyagi Prefecture	Dewa Sendai Kaidō Nakayamagoe Pass	38°44′15″N 140°36′59″E	6	3095
Jion-ji Old Precinct 慈恩寺旧境内 Jionji kyū-keidai	Sagae	Buddhist temple founded in the Nara period	Jionji Old Precinct	38°24′37″N 140°15′03″E	3	00003856
Tateyama Castle ruins 舘山城跡 Tateyama-jō ato	Yonezawa	Sengoku period castle ruins	Tateyama Castle Site	37°54′43″N 140°03′46″E	2	00003928
Koyamazaki Site 小山崎遺跡 Koyamazaki iseki	Yuza			39°04′18″N 139°53′20″E	1	00004090
Sankyo Warehouses 山居倉庫 Sankyo sōko	Sakata		Sankyo Warehouses	38°54′41″N 139°50′13″E	6	00004112
Former Higashitagawa District Office and Assembly Building 旧東田川郡役所及び郡会議事堂 kyū-Higashitagawa gunyakusho oyobi gunkaigi jidō	Tsuruoka			38°45′58″N 139°54′08″E		

== Prefectural Historic Sites ==
As of 1 May 2022, thirty-two Sites have been designated as being of prefectural importance.

Site	Municipality	Comments	Image	Coordinates	Type	Ref.
Akutsu Kofun Cluster 安久津古墳群; Akutsu kofun-gun	Takahata			38°00′28″N 140°12′02″E		
Amagasawa Earthen Altar 尼ヶ沢土壇; Amagasawa dodan	Kawanishi			38°00′16″N 140°02′37″E		
Aratame Castle ruins 新田目城跡; Aratame-jō ato	Sakata			38°58′03″N 139°53′19″E		
Iidesan Water Conduit 飯豊山の穴堰; Iidesan no anazeki	Iide, Oguni	147.7 m tunnel excavated through Mount Iide between 1798 and 1818		37°51′25″N 139°42′27″E		
Sakata Ichirizuka 一里塚 ichirizuka	Sakata			38°53′44″N 139°53′13″E		
Kakuchi Gakusha 格知学舎; Kakuchi gakusha	Tendō			38°20′38″N 140°24′35″E		
Kakuniyama Stone Age Dwelling Sites 角二山石器時代住居跡群; Fukiura sekki-jidai jūkyo ato-gun	Ōishida			38°35′20″N 140°22′23″E		
Kawashimayama Site 河島山遺跡; Kawashimayama iseki	Murayama			38°29′10″N 140°21′13″E		
Kitadate Daigaku Grave 北楯大学墓; Kitadate Daigaku no haka	Shōnai			38°47′31″N 139°58′27″E		
Former Yamagata Prefectural Assembly Building 旧山形県会仮議事堂 kyū-Yamagata-ken kaikarigijidō	Yamagata			38°15′25″N 140°20′25″E		
Kyōgakura Sutra Mound 経ヶ倉山経塚; Kyōgakura kyōzuka	Sakata			38°54′44″N 140°02′56″E		
Shimizu Castle ruins 清水城跡; Shimizu-jō ato	Ōkura			38°41′53″N 140°13′30″E		
Shimizumae Kofun Cluster 清水前古墳群; Shimizumae kofun-gun	Takahata			38°00′30″N 140°13′49″E		
Jūgorigahara Battlefield 十五里ヶ原古戦場; Jūgorigahara ko-senjō	Tsuruoka			38°44′49″N 139°47′06″E		
Hayama Sue Ware Kiln Site 須恵器窯跡; Sueki kama ato	Kaminoyama			38°08′53″N 140°15′40″E		
Arasawamae Sue Ware Kiln Site 須恵器窯跡; Sueki kama ato	Tsuruoka			38°42′59″N 139°42′54″E		
Sugesawa No.2 Kofun 菅沢古墳二号墳; Sugesawa kofun nigōfun	Yamagata			38°13′39″N 140°16′17″E		
Takaseyama Kofun 高瀬山古墳; Takaseyama kofun	Sagae			38°21′46″N 140°16′10″E		
Takahara Kofun 高原古墳; Takahara kofun	Yamagata			38°16′44″N 140°22′04″E		
Takeda Daizen no Tayū Nobikyo Grave 武田大膳太夫信清の墓; Takeda Daizen no Tayū Nobikyo no haka	Yonezawa			37°54′05″N 140°06′05″E		
Tamagawa Jōmon Site 玉川縄文遺跡; Tamagawa Jōmon iseki	Tsuruoka			38°42′20″N 139°56′23″E		
Tsuchiyagura Kofun Cluster 土矢倉古墳群; Tsuchiyagura kofun-gun	Kaminoyama			38°09′47″N 140°18′01″E		
Tenjinmori Kofun 天神森古墳; Tenjinmori kofun	Kawanishi			38°00′24″N 140°03′04″E		
Naoe Kanetsugu Grave 直江兼続夫妻の墓; Naoe Kanetsugu fusai no haka	Yonezawa	graves of both husband and wife at Rinsen-ji (林泉寺)		37°54′05″N 140°06′05″E		
Nakamurahara Earthen Altar 中村原土壇; Nakamurahara dodan	Iide			38°04′22″N 139°58′43″E		
Niirone Kofun Cluster 二色根古墳; Niirone kofun-gun	Nan'yō			38°03′25″N 140°09′31″E		
Mount Haguro Southern Valley 羽黒山南谷; Hagurosan minami-dani	Tsuruoka			38°42′06″N 139°58′56″E		
Harusame-an ruins 春雨庵跡; Harusame-an ato	Kaminoyama			38°09′23″N 140°16′08″E		
Hirakata Fortified Residence ruins 平形館跡; Hirakata tate ato	Tsuruoka			38°46′31″N 139°53′56″E		
Fukiura Stone Age Site 吹浦石器時代遺跡; Fukiura sekki-jidai iseki	Yuza			39°04′10″N 139°52′54″E		
Maruoka Castle ruins 丸岡城跡及び加藤清正墓碑; Maruoka-jō ato oyobi Katō Kiyomasa bohi	Tsuruoka	designation includes the tombstone of Katō Kiyomasa		38°40′51″N 139°49′54″E		
Yagashiwa Kofun Cluster 谷柏古墳群; Yagashiwa kofun-gun	Yamagata			38°12′40″N 140°17′10″E		

== Municipal Historic Sites ==
As of 1 May 2022 a further one hundred and seventy-one Sites have been designated as being of municipal importance, including:

Site	Municipality	Comments	Image	Coordinates	Type	Ref.
Shinjō Castle Site (Saijō Park) 新庄城址（最上公園） Shinjō-jō ato (Saijō kōen)	Shinjō			38°46′01″N 140°17′37″E		
Bashō Poem Stele and a Trace of Pure Water from a Willow 芭蕉の句碑と柳の清水跡; Bashō no kuhi to yanagi no shimizu ato	Shinjō	Bashō was in the vicinity in 1689, during his journey immortalized in Oku no Hosomichi; the stele is inscribed with his poem "water's interior / enquiring of an ice house / a willow ah" (水の奥 氷室尋る 柳哉)		38°44′54″N 140°18′32″E		
Ayukai Castle Honmaru Site 鮎貝城本丸跡; Ayukai-jō honmaru ato	Shirataka			38°11′29″N 140°04′30″E		
Kamōdayama Kofun 蒲生田山古墳; Kamōdayama kofun	Nan'yō			38°04′05″N 140°09′32″E		
33 Kannon on Mount Iwabe 岩部山三十三観音; Iwabe-yama sanjūsan Kannon	Nan'yō			38°05′46″N 140°12′04″E		

== See also ==
- Cultural Properties of Japan
- Dewa Province
- Yamagata Prefectural Museum
- List of Cultural Properties of Japan - paintings (Yamagata)
- List of Places of Scenic Beauty of Japan (Yamagata)
- Thirteen Buddhist Sites of Dewa
- Thirteen Buddhist Sites of Yamagata
