= Sankyo Warehouses =

- 旧新潟税関
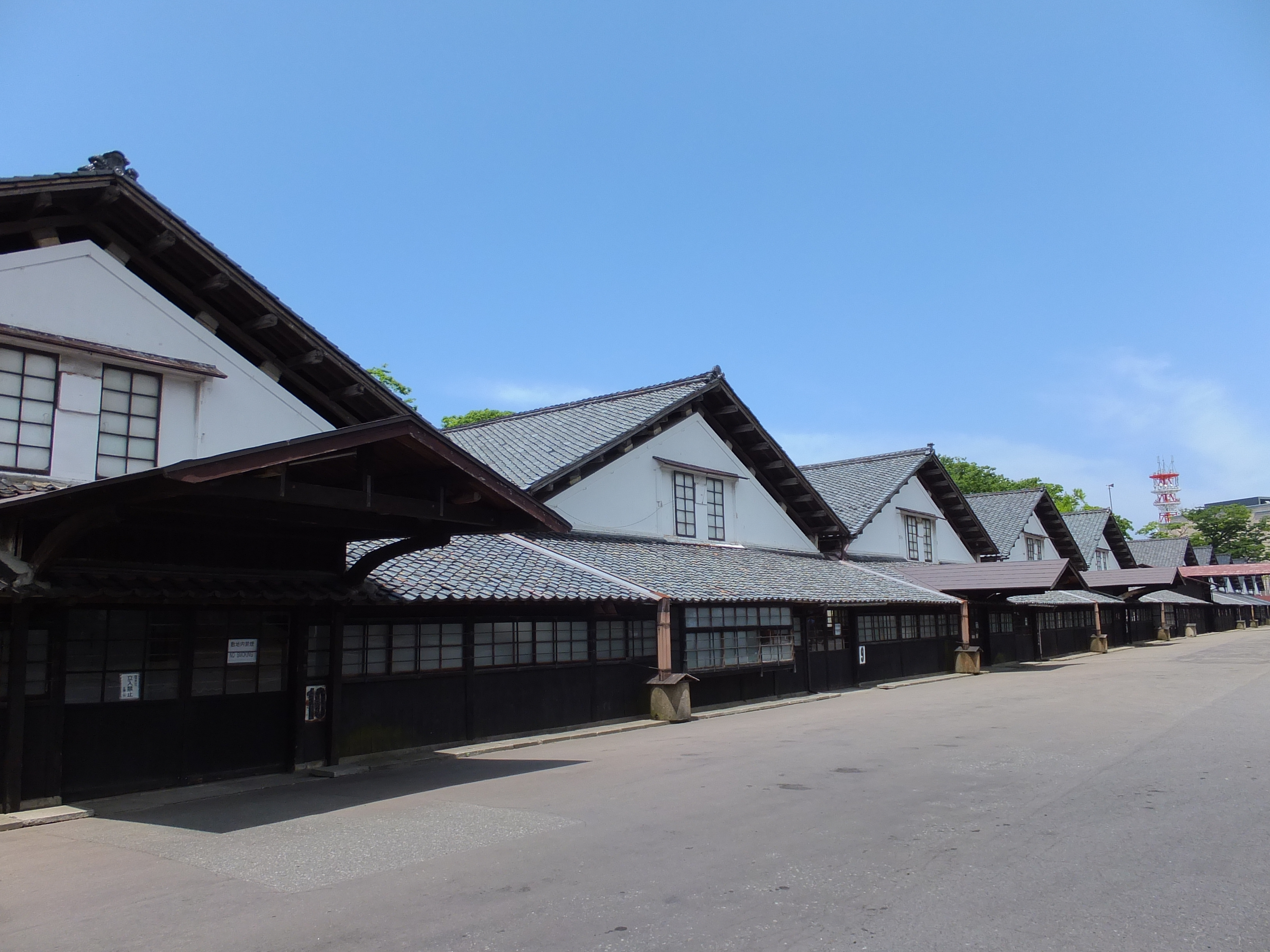
- Sankyo Warehouse in Sakata, Yamagata

- Location within Yamagata Prefecture Location within Japan

General information
- Location: Sakata, Yamagata, Japan
- Coordinates: 38°54′41″N 139°50′12.5″E
- Opened: 1893
- National Historic Site of Japan

The Sankyo Warehouses (山居倉庫, Sankyo sōko) is a group of early Meiji period rice warehouses in the city of Sakata, Yamagata Prefecture, Japan The buildings were designated a National Historic Site of Japan in 2021.

== Overview ==
The Sankyo Warehouses were constructed in 1893 by the Sakai clan, the former daimyō of Shōnai Domain in what was then Udogawahara Village, as an auxiliary warehouse for the Sakata Rice Exchange. Designed by a local master carpenter Takahashi Kanekichi, a total of 14 structures were built. The site was originally an island (Yamaijima) in the Arata River that runs through Sakata City. It was close to a port and suitable for shipping, but the ground was weak. This problem was solved by building a 3.6-meter-high mound and stone walls, and driving 3.6-meter-long piles under the foundations. The warehouse itself sustained only minor damage in the magnitude 7.0 1894 Shōnai earthquake, the year after its completion, whereas the domain's storehouse was burned down. Zelkova trees are planted on the west side of the warehouse, which block the sunlight and protect the building from strong winter winds. The roof is a double-layered flat roof for insulation, and the interior dirt floor is made of bittern kneaded and hardened and then covered with salt, a technique that keeps the temperature and humidity inside the warehouse constant. Each warehouse is 13.6 meters wide by 29.1 meters long and had a capacity of holding 16,442 bales (60 kilograms each) of rice. There was also a wharf facing the river, and it was one of the bases for shipping on the Mogami River. In the Edo period, boats were the main method of transportation, but in the Meiji period, they were replaced by small cormorant fishing boats. A restored small cormorant fishing boat is kept on the premises. Women called Onnachomochi carried the rice bales from the warehouse to the boat. In addition, to protect the goods from the wind and rain during transportation, roofs were placed over the loading gates and wharves, and they were connected by corridors.

The Sankyo Warehouses were managed and operated by the Sakai family until the 1939 Rice Distribution Control Law, when jurisdiction was transferred to the Hokutokai Foundation, the Shonai Economic Federation, and the Yamagata Prefectural Headquarters of the Japan Agricultural Cooperatives. At present, 12 buildings remain, of which nine were still in use as rice storehouses until 2022. One was renovated in 1985 as the Shonai Rice History Museum, and two were renovated in 2004 as the Sakata City Tourist and Products Center Sakata Yume no Kura, both of which are open to the public. The warehouses now form a tourist attraction, and have been used as locations for filming movies and television shows, including the NHK drama Oshin.

The warehouses are about ten minutes by car from Sakata Station on the JR East Uetsu Main Line.

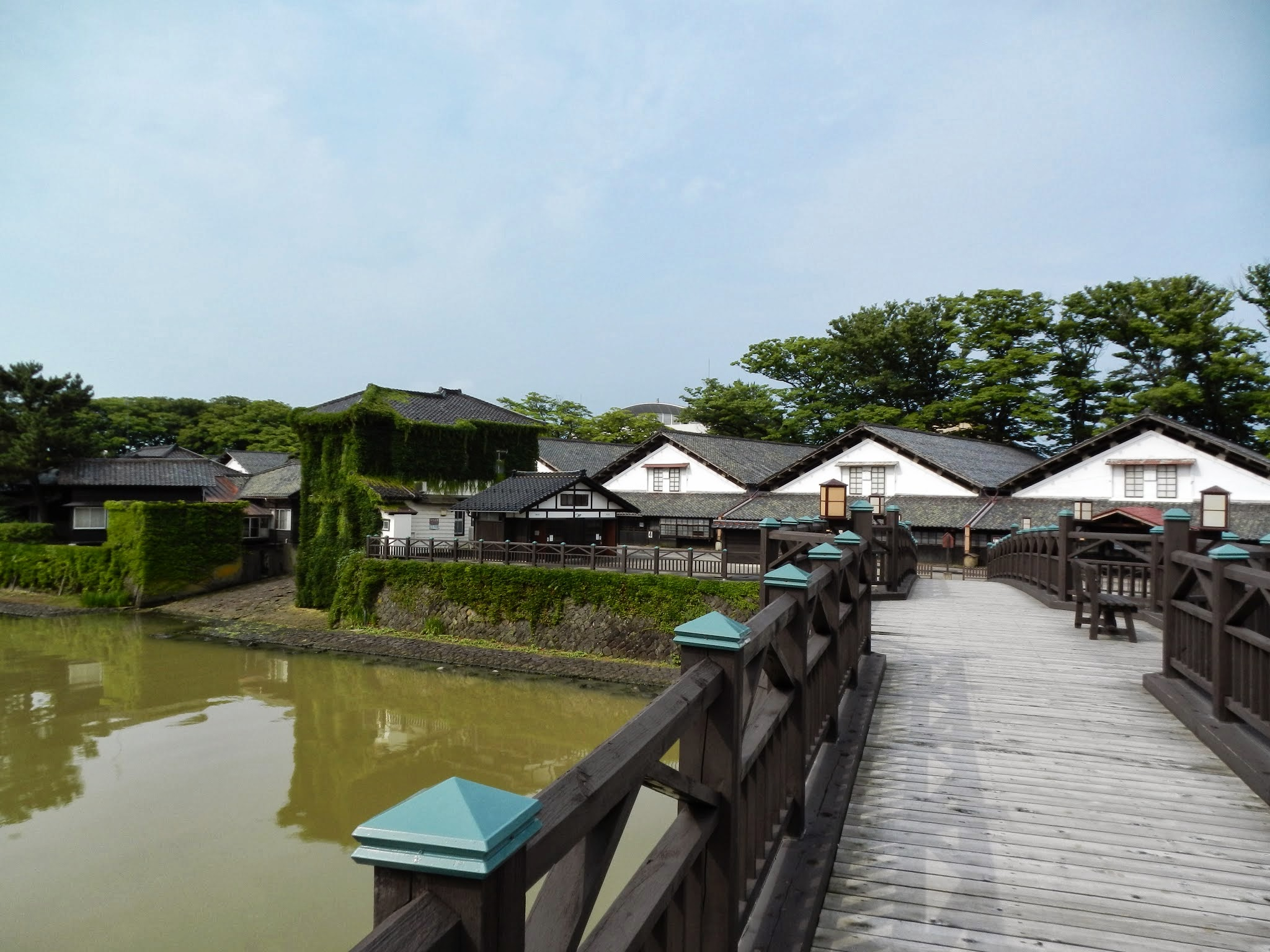
Sankyo Warehouses

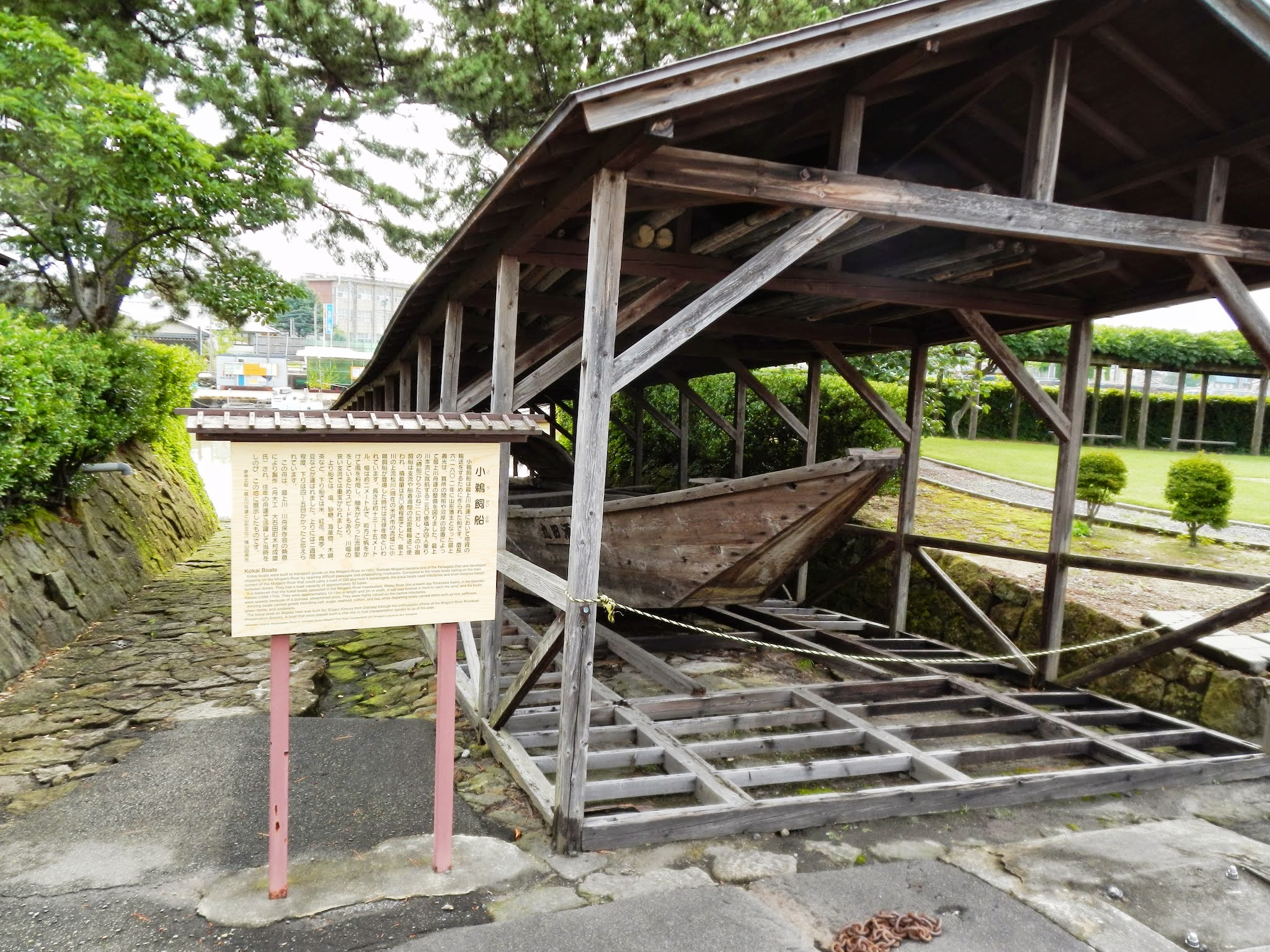
Cormorant fishing boat

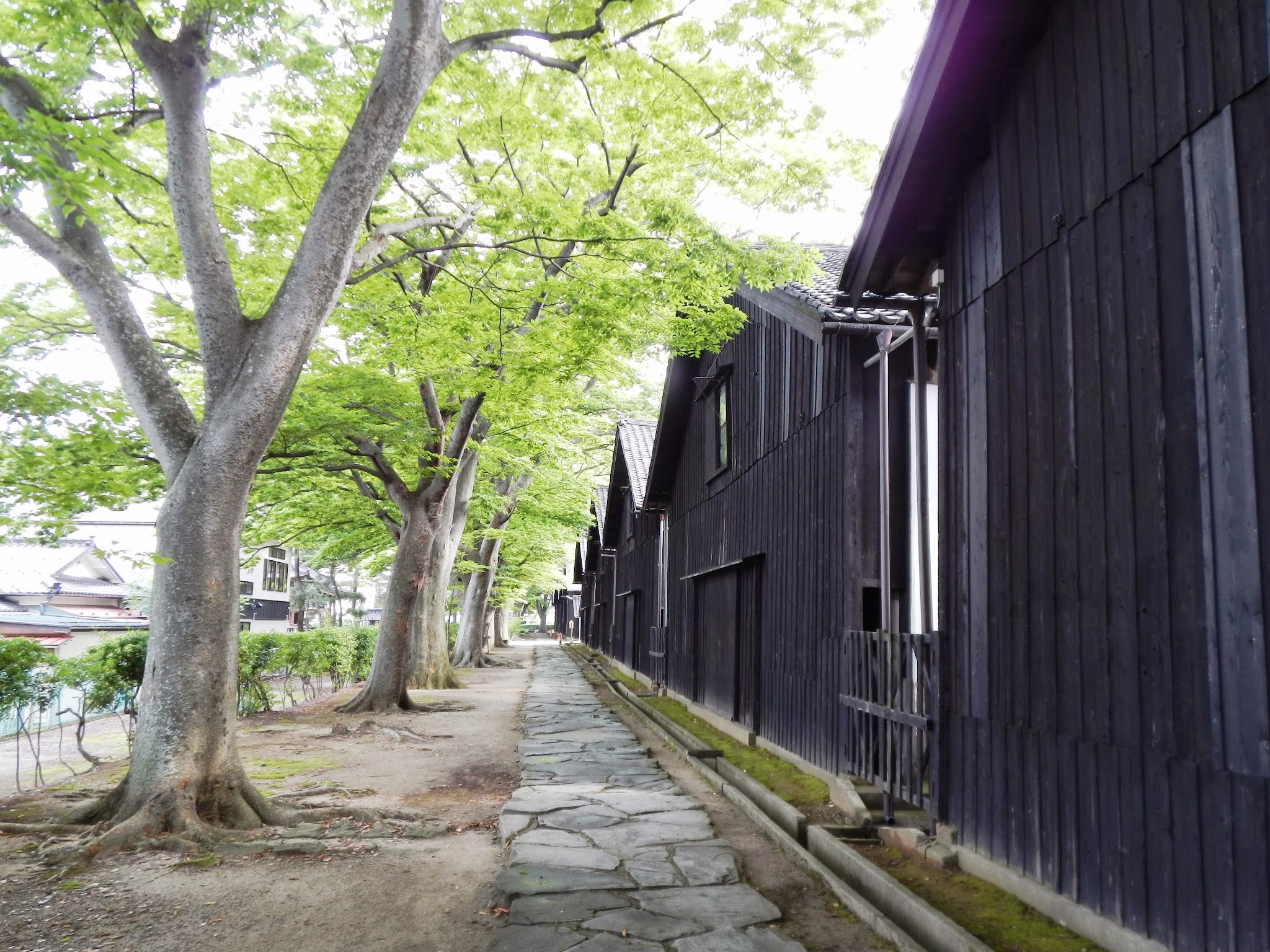
side view with zelkova trees

== See also ==
- List of Historic Sites of Japan (Yamagata)
