= Ichinosaka ruins =

Jōmon period archaeological site in Yonezawa, Tōhoku, Japan

- 一ノ坂遺跡 (Japanese)
- Ichinosaka ruins Ichinosaka ruins (Japan)
- 37°54′35″N 140°04′54″E
- Type: settlement
- Periods: Jōmon period
- Location: Yonezawa, Yamagata, Japan
- Region: Tōhoku region

Site notes
- Elevation: 260 m (850 ft)
- Excavation dates: 1990-1994
- Discovered: 1989
- Public access: Yes (no facilities)

The Ichinosaka ruins (一ノ坂遺跡, Ichinosaka iseki) is an archaeological site containing the ruins of an early Jōmon period (4000–2500 BCE) settlement located in what is now part of the city of Yonezawa, Yamagata in the Tōhoku region of Japan. The site was designated a National Historic Site of Japan in 1997.

== Overview ==
The ruins are located on a river terrace at the foot of a hill in the southwestern end of the Yonezawa Basin and extend for 90 meters east–west by 80 meters north–south. During excavations in conjunction with land development in 1989, the foundations of the longest pit dwelling thus far found in Japan, with a length of 43.5 meters and width of four meters was discovered. This longhouse-type structure was contemporary with the Sannai-Maruyama Site in Aomori Prefecture to the north. The purpose of such a huge building is uncertain, but from the presence of six furnaces spaced evenly along one wall, and almost two million shards and semi-finished examples for stoneware, especially stone lances and stone harpoons, it was believed to be a production center for stone tools. Further excavations from 1990 to 1994 found the foundations for a further 24 smaller pit dwellings and six earthenware graves.

The site was backfilled after excavation and is now a grassy hill with an explanatory plaque. It is located approximately 17 minutes on foot from Nishi-Yonezawa Station on the JR East Yonesaka Line

== See also ==
- List of Historic Sites of Japan (Yamagata)
