= Shimokomatsu Kofun Cluster =

Shimokomatsu Kofun group
- 下小松古墳群 (Japanese)
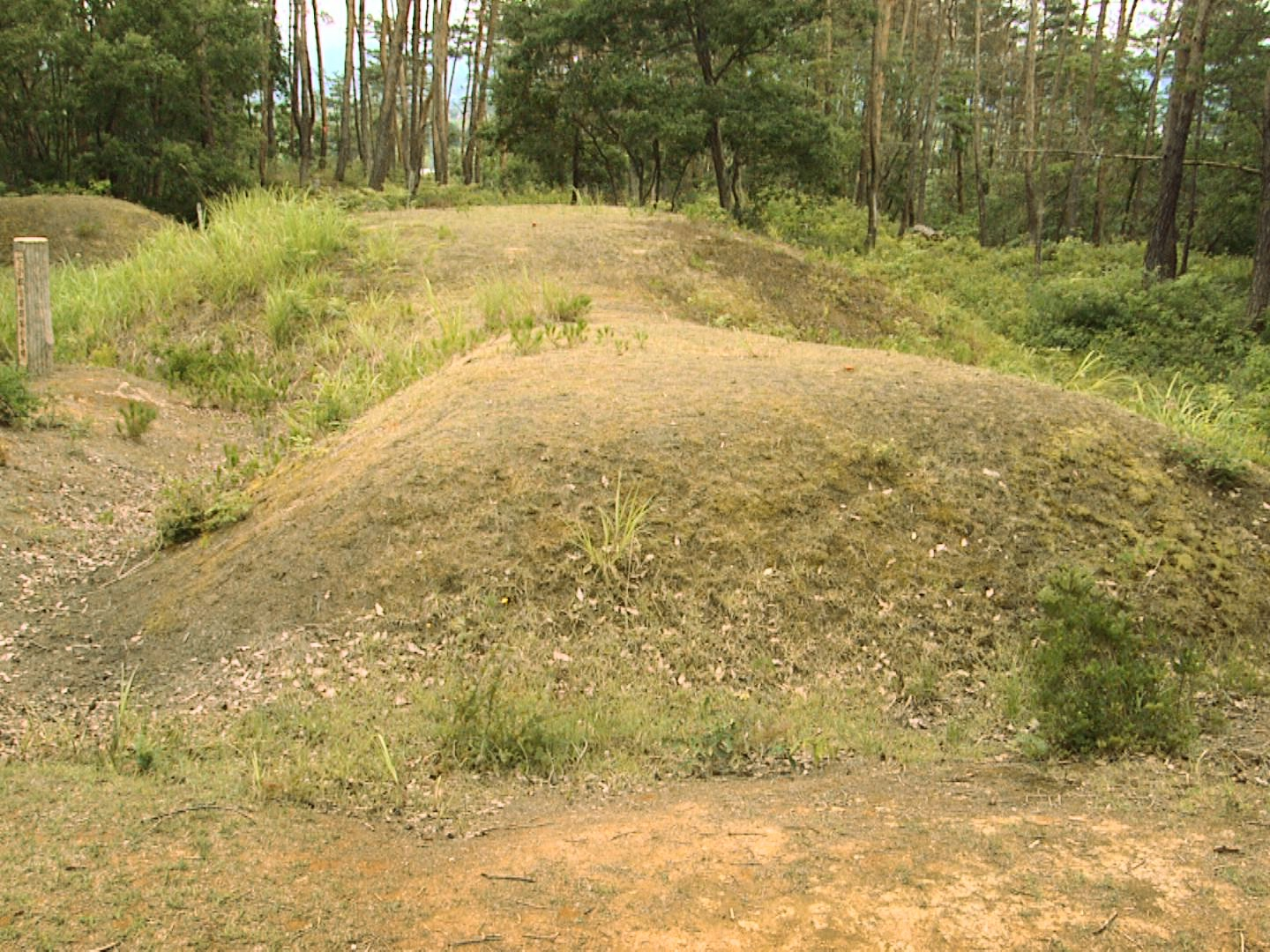
- Shimokomatsu Kofun group

- Shimokomatsu Kofun group Shimokomatsu Kofun Cluster (Japan)
- 38°01′23″N 140°02′20″E
- Type: burial tumulus
- Periods: Kofun period
- Location: Kawanishi, Yamagata, Japan
- Region: Tōhoku region

Site notes
- Public access: yes

The Shimokomatsu Kofun group (下小松古墳群, Shimokomatsu kofun-gun) is the collective name for an archaeological site consisting of six separate clusters of Kofun period burial mounds located in what is now part of the town of Kawanishi, Yamagata in the Tōhoku region of Japan. The site was designated a National Historic Site of Japan in 2000.

== Overview ==
The Shimokomatsu Kofun group consists of 202 known kofun arranged into six clusters on a long ridge at an altitude of 230 to 280 meters in the Shimokomatsu neighborhood of Kawanishi. These include 21 zenpō-kōen-fun (前方後円墳) (which are shaped like a keyhole, having one square end and one circular end, when viewed from above) or zenpō-kōhō-fun (前方後方墳) ( "two conjoined rectangles" type keyhole tumuli). This cluster contains over half of the keyhole-shaped tumuli which have been found in Yamagata. These kofun were built from the end of the 4th century to the early 6th century AD. Archaeological excavations are ongoing, and various grave goods such as bronze mirrors, jewelry, weapons and agricultural tools have been recovered. The National Historic Site designation encompasses a total of 179 tumuli in three groups.

The site is located approximately 10 minutes by car from Uzen-Komatsu Station on the JR East Yonesaka Line.

== See also ==
- List of Historic Sites of Japan (Yamagata)
