= Oguni Castle (Tsuruoka) =

- 小国城
- Tsuruoka, Yamagata, Japan

Site information
- Type: yamashiro-style Japanese castle
- Condition: Ruins; only earthwork walls and dry moat remain

Location
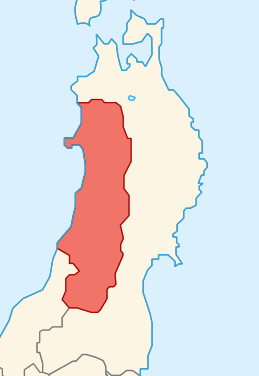
- Location within Yamagata Prefecture Location within Dewa, Japan Location within Japan
- Coordinates: 38°34′03″N 139°37′56″E

Site history
- Built: Nanboku-chō period
- Built by: Oguni clan
- Demolished: 1615

Oguni Castle (小国城, Oguni-jō) was a Nanboku-chō period yamashiro-style Japanese castle located in what is now part of the city of Tsuruoka, Yamagata Prefecture in the Tōhoku region of northern Japan. The site has been protected by the central government as a National Historic Site since 2002. The site is approximately 30 minutes by car from Atsumi Onsen Station on the JR East Uetsu Main Line. It should not be confused with another Oguni Castle in Dewa Province, located in the Mogami region.

== Background ==
Oguni Castle is located in the south of Tsuruoka city and only five kilometers from the border of Yamagata Prefecture and Niigata Prefecture. The Murakami Basin in Niigata Prefecture (former Echigo Province) and Yamagata Prefecture (former Dewa Province) are separated by the 60-kilometer long Asahi Mountains. However these low mountains were not a significant barrier, and the Dewa Kaidō was built as early as the 8th century to connect Iwafune Castle in Echigo with Akita Castle by the Yamato State. The ancient road had two routes, a coastal route which is now roughly covered by Japan National Route 7 and a more frequently used inland route, which now corresponds to Japan National Route 345. The inland route led to the valley of the Oguni River in Dewa, and the village of Oguni served as a shukuba and border post.

== History of Oguni Castle ==
The exact year that Oguni Castle was built is unknown, but the location was selected to guard the pass between Echigo and Dewa and the castle was controlled by the local Oguni clan. During the Nanboku-chō period, the Oguni supported the Southern Court against their neighbors, the Daihoji clan, who were supporters of the Muromachi shogunate. However, as the influence of the Southern Court waned, the Oguni eventually became vassals of the Daihoji, who in turn were vassals of the Uesugi clan. With the support of Uesugi Kenshin, the Daihoji clan expanded their control over the Shōnai region of Dewa during the early Sengoku period, but after the death of Uesugi Kenshin, the Uesugi clan fell into disarray due to internal conflicts and the Daihoji clan was left to fend for itself. The Daihoji were decisively defeated by the Mogami clan in 1585 and their leader, Daihoji Yoshiuji, fled to Murakami seeking shelter from Honjō Shigenaga, an important retainer of the Uesugi. Daihoji Yoshiuji adopted a son of Honjō Shigenaga as his heir, further strengthening the alliance, and the Mogami clan rebuilt the fortifications at Oguni Castle in preparation for an aggressive attempt by the Uesugi and Honjō to invade Dewa.

This chance came in 1588, when Mogami Yoshiaki and his forces were supporting Date Masamune on the far side of the Ōu Mountains. Honjō forces invaded and quickly overran Oguni Castle and went on to capture all of the Shōnai area. However, in 1598, the Uesugi clan was relocated on order of Toyotomi Hideyoshi from Echigo to Aizu, leaving the Shōnai area as a detached and vulnerable holding of the Uesugi. The defenses of Oguni Castle were again strengthened. In 1600, as part of the wider Sekigahara campaign, the forces of Uesugi Kagekatsu attacked pro-Tokugawa Mogami Yoshiaki. Possession of the Shōnai area enabled the Uesugi to attack the Mogami in a pincher maneuver and the Uesugi forces captured much of the Yamagata Basin from the Mogami: however, the victory of Tokugawa Ieyasu at the Battle of Sekigahara caused the Uesugi to abandon their territorial gains in order to defend against an expected attack. The Mogami quickly recaptured the Shōnai area and Oguni Castle once again became a border castle.

In 1622, the Tokugawa shogunate suppressed the Mogami clan and broke up their holdings. The Sakai clan, rulers of Shōnai Domain retained Oguni Castle as a border fortress despite the shogunate's "One Country - One Castle" ruling until the Meiji restoration.

At present, nothing remains of the castle structure but a few scattered and poorly signposted ruins on a forested hill. The area is open to the public as a hiking course.

== Structure ==
Oguni Castle had a rectangular inner bailey measuring 50 x30 meters, wholly surrounded by a clay rampart, with a gap in the east, in which was located the main gate. The secondary enclosure and third enclosure were roughly the same size as central area but were just flat terraces built on the slope of the mountain. East of third enclosure was a large and narrow flat terrace, 80 meter long, which served as a mustering location for hillside soldiers.

West of central area was a deep dry moat, and is a large area 100 meter long and 50 meter wide containing many small terraces. This area is called as "Nishi Oyashiki" (West Palace) and might have been the hilltop residence of the commander. With a total size of the castle is around 500 meter long, it is one of the larger mountain castles of Dewa Province.

No structures of the castle have survived, except for some fragments of its clay ramparts and moats.

== See also ==
- List of Historic Sites of Japan (Yamagata)
