= Nishinumata ruins =

Archaeological site in Japan

- 西沼田遺跡 (Japanese)
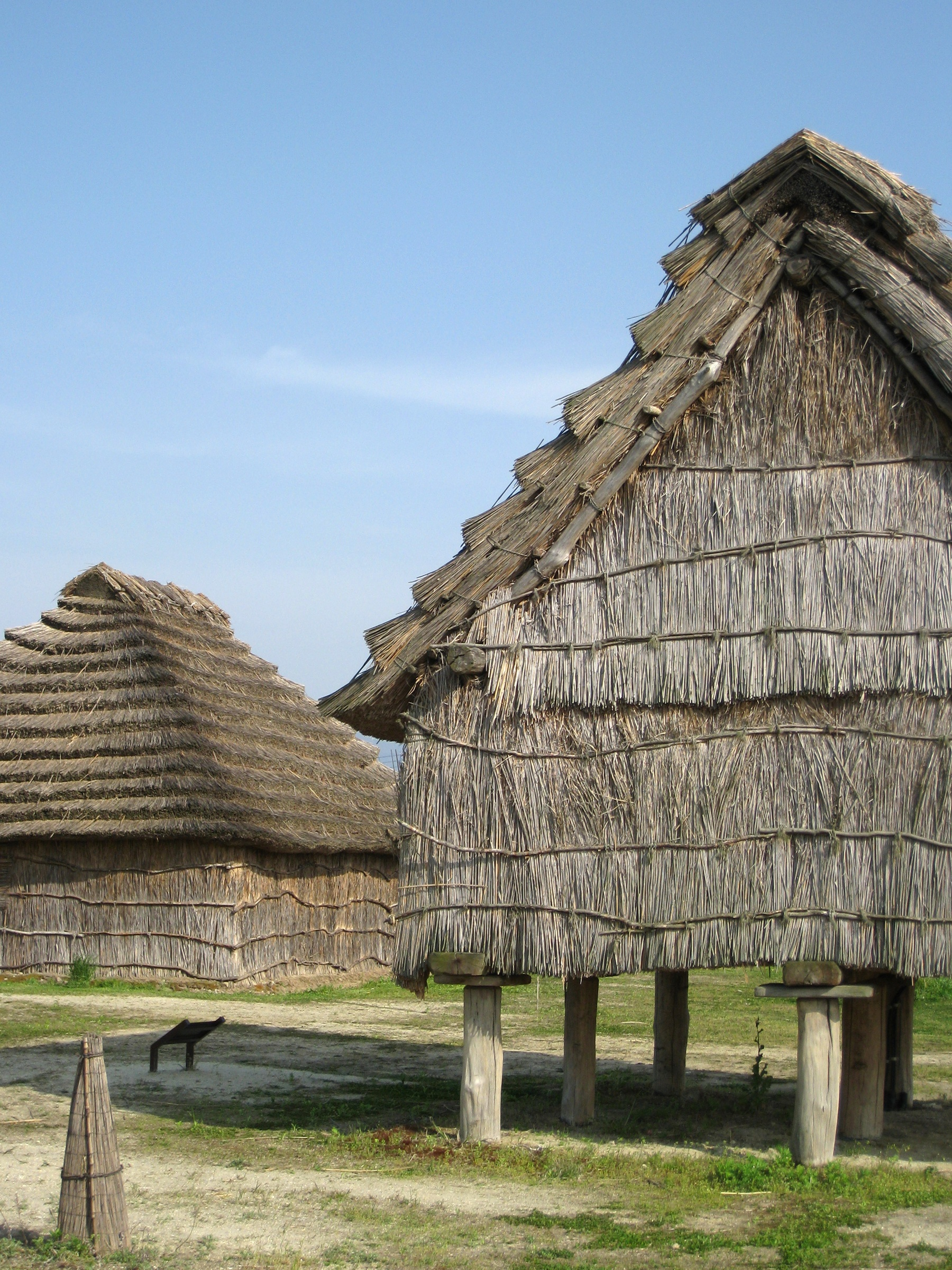
- Tendō Nishinumata Archaeological Park

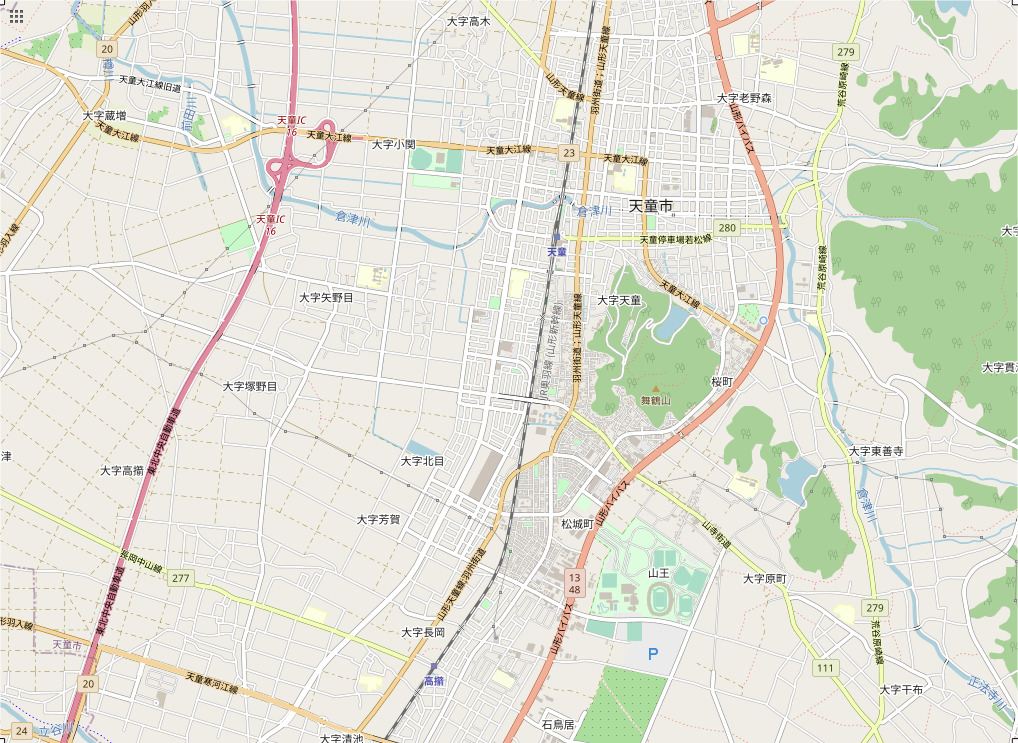
- Nishinumata ruins Nishinumata ruins (Yamagata Prefecture) Nishinumata ruins (Japan)
- 38°21′35.5″N 140°20′32.1″E
- Type: settlement
- Periods: Kofun period
- Location: Tendō, Yamagata, Japan
- Region: Tōhoku region

Site notes
- Area: 45,000 m^{2} (480,000 sq ft)
- Discovered: 1985
- Public access: Yes (Archaeological Park)

The Nishinumata ruins (西沼田遺跡, Nishinumata iseki) is an archaeological site containing the ruins of a late Kofun period (6th century AD) settlement located in what is now part of the city of Tendō, Yamagata in the Tōhoku region of Japan. The site was designated a National Historic Site of Japan in 1987.

== Overview ==
The site is located on the lower right bank of the Mogami River in the Yamagata Basin, in the Yanome neighborhood of Tendō. It was discovered in 1985 in conjunction with a prefectural farmland improvement project. The site now covers an area of 45,000 square meters and is a rare example of a rural settlement before the formation of Mutsu Province. Excavation surveys confirmed the foundations of 16 pillared buildings, two of which appear to have been granaries, and 14 of which were residences, along with wells, rice paddies and a dam to create a pond. The settlement area was protected by a wooden palisade.

The site was opened to the public in 2008 as the Tendō Nishinumata Archaeological Park (天童市西沼田遺跡公園, Nishinumata iseki) with a number of reconstructed buildings and a museum. It is located a short walk from the Nishinumata Archaeological Park bus stop on the Tendō city bus from Tendō Station on the Yamagata Shinkansen.

== Gallery ==
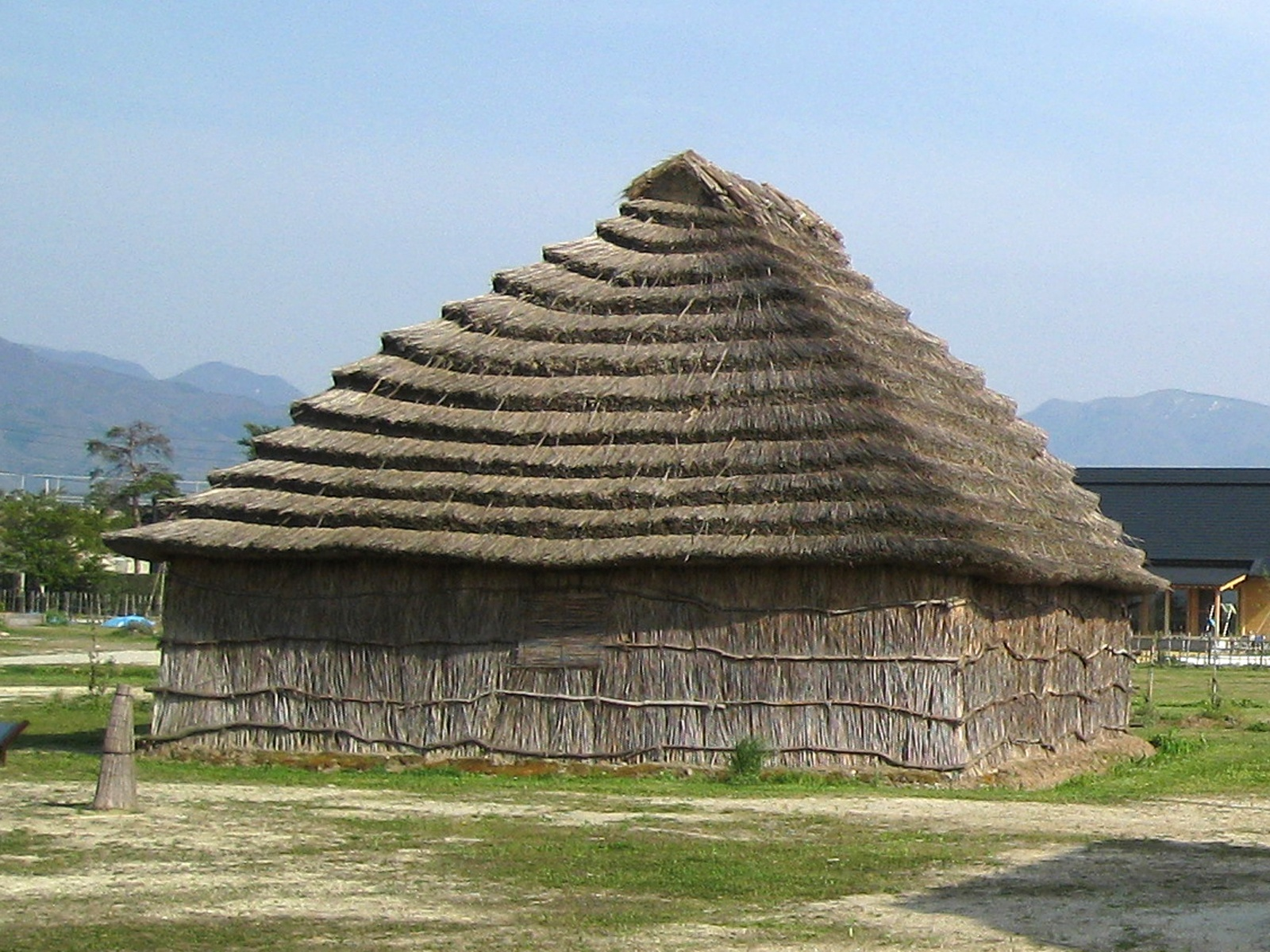
House No. 11

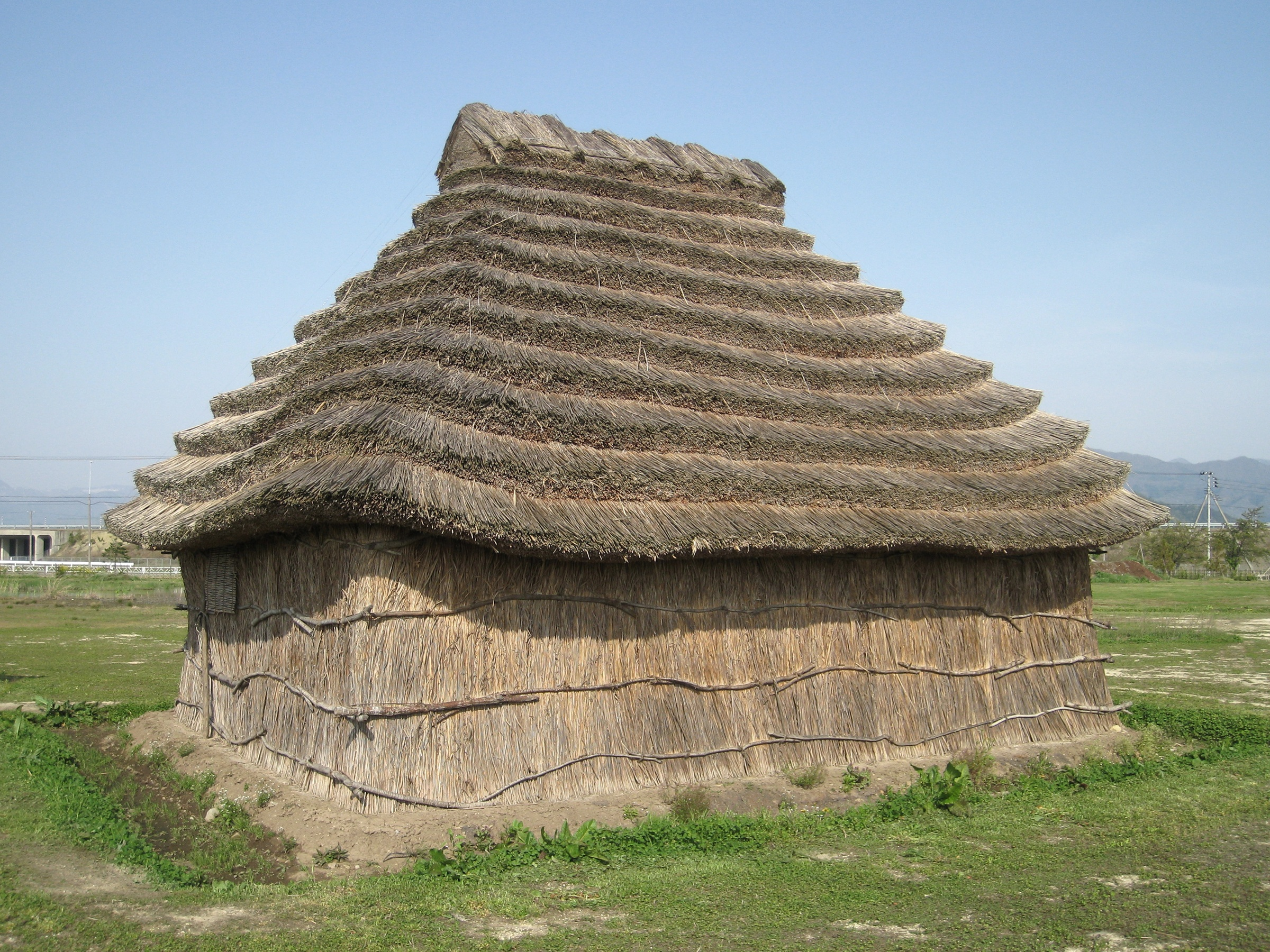
House No. 10

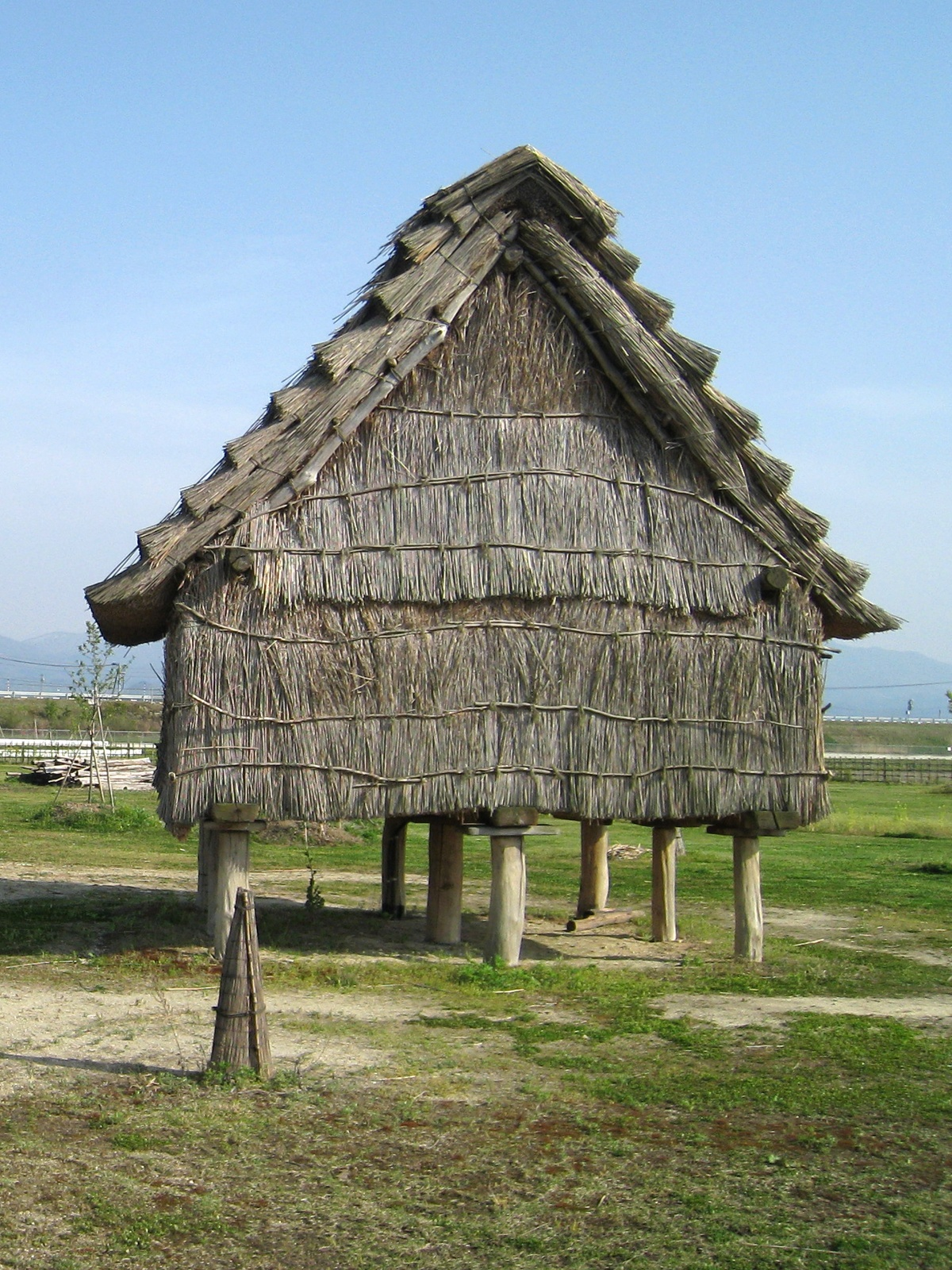
House No. 7

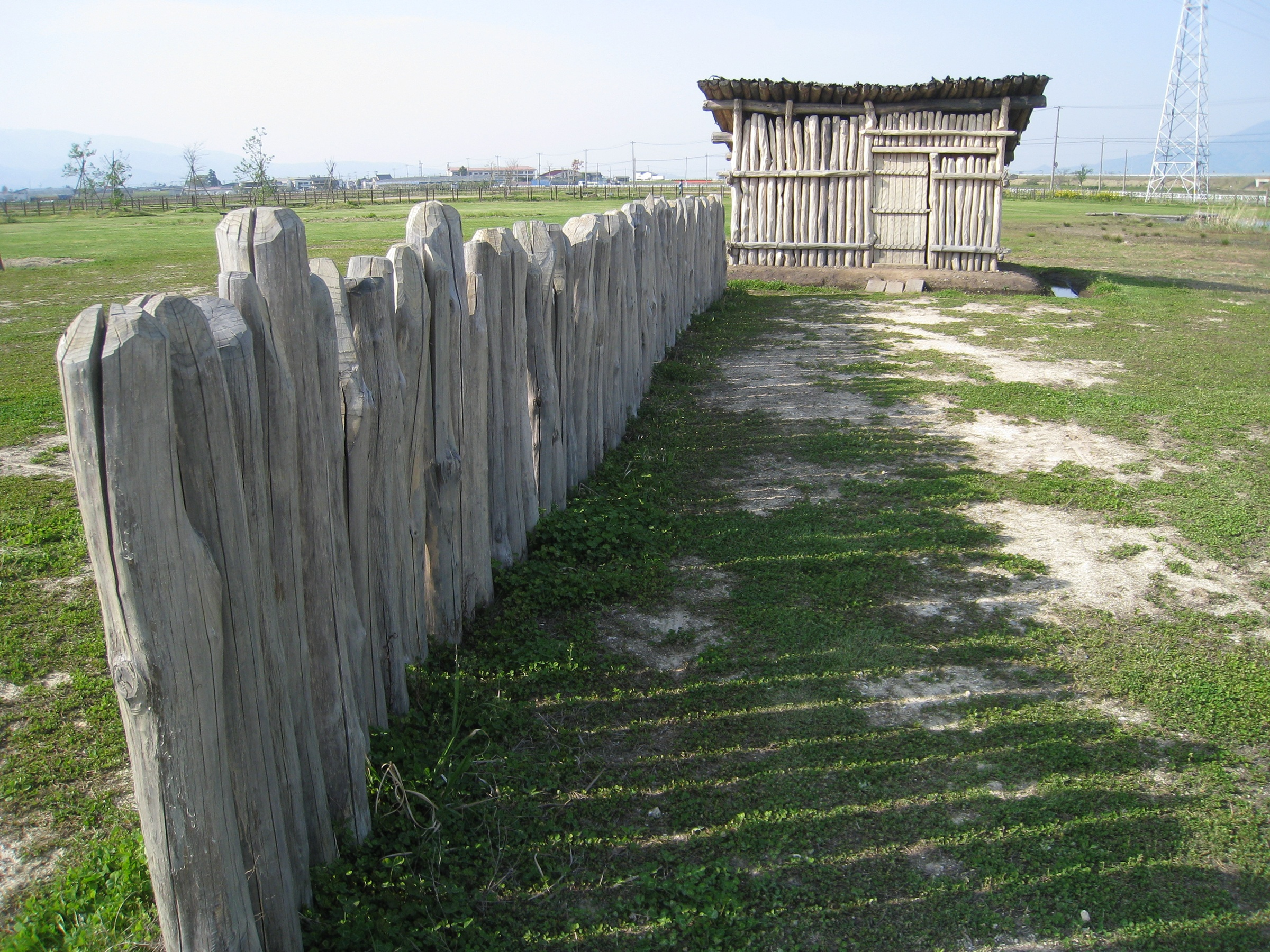
House No. 15 and Palisade

== See also ==
- List of Historic Sites of Japan (Yamagata)
