= Aterazawa Tateyama Castle =

- 左沢楯山城
- Ōe, Yamagata, Japan

Site information
- Type: yamashiro-style Japanese castle
- Condition: Ruins; only earthwork walls and dry moat remain

Location
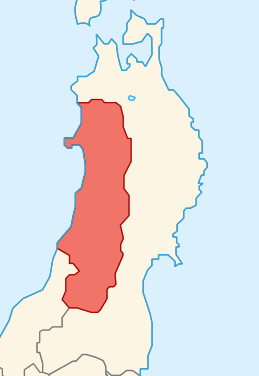
- Coordinates: 38°23′11″N 140°13′00″E

Site history
- Built: Kamakura period
- Built by: Aterazawa clan
- Demolished: early Edo period

Aterazawa Tateyama Castle (左沢楯山城, Aterazawa Tateyama-jō) was a Sengoku period yamashiro-style Japanese castle located in what is now part of the town of Ōe, Yamagata Prefecture in the Tohoku region of Japan. The site has been protected by the central government as a National Historic Site since 2009. The site is approximately a 20 minutes walk from JR East Aterazawa Line Aterazawa Station.

== History ==
Aterazawa Tateyama Castle is located on a U-shaped plateau overlooking a bend of the Mogami River, east of former town center of Aterazawa in the middle of the Yamagata basin. The Mogami River connects the Yonezawa Basin, and Yamagata Basin with the Sakata Plains and the Sea of Japan coast, and was thus crucial for the shipment of rice from these production areas to markets in western Japan. The location of Aterazawa Tateyama Castle was ideal for the control of river traffic, and was also the furthest inland location that larger ships could reach during the medieval period. The castle therefore controlled the most important junction between river and land transportation in most of Dewa Province.

The first fortification was erected at this site by the local Aterazawa clan in 14th century. The Aterazawa clan was a cadet clan descended from Ōe no Hiromoto (1148-1225), an important retainer to Minamoto no Yoritomo and the ancestor of the Mōri clan of Chōshū. During the late Kamakura period through Muromachi period, various cadet branches of the Ōe clan controlled much of the territory surrounding the Mogami River. The Atetazawa supported the Southern Court against the Ashikaga shogunate.

In 1368, Ashikaga dispatched an army led by Shiba Kaneyori to subjugate the Mogami area. The Aterazawa were defeated at the Battle of Urushigawa, and subsequently pledged fealty to the Shiba, who changed their name to "Mogami". However, the area was soon threatened by the expanding hegemony of the Date clan from the south, and Aterazawa Tateyama Castle was expanded to meet this threat.

In 1514, the Date broke the power of the Mogami clan; however, the Date soon fell into a war of succession, and their hold on the Mogami area was fractured. This enabled the Mogami clan to regroup, and under Mogami Yoshiaki, the Mogami gradually re-conquered their rivals throughout the region. The Aterazawa clan fell to a Mogami attack in 1584 and disappeared from history. Their castle was subsequently occupied by the Mogami as a local center of administration.

After the Battle of Sekigahara in 1600, Mogami Yoshiaki was confirmed as daimyō over all of Dewa Province (except for the Yonezawa Basin) under the Tokugawa shogunate. However, the clan underwent a number of inheritance struggles, and was dispossessed of its holdings. Aterazawa Tateyama Castle became part of the holdings of the Sakai clan, daimyō of Tsuruoka Domain, and was subsequently abandoned.

At present, there is little trace of the former castle but a few scattered ruins. The site is open to the public as Tateyama Park.

== Structure ==
Aterazawa Tateyama Castle occupies a long U-shaped position on a hill approximately 100 meters above a bend in the Mogami River near its confluence with the Sagae River. The castle has an overall length of approximately 500 meters and width of up to 400 meters, separated into many small terraces which were divided by clay walls. Vertical dry moats were built at the slope facing the river, to discourage attempts by attackers to climb from ships anchored below the castle. To the back side of the castle, the hill is also fortified with terraces, and the castle entrance had a small masugata-style gate.

No structures of the castle have survived, except for some disconnected fragments of its earthen ramparts and moats.

== See also ==
- List of Historic Sites of Japan (Yamagata)
