= Matsugaoka Land Reclamation Area =

Matsugaoka reclamation site
- 松ヶ岡開墾場 (Japanese)
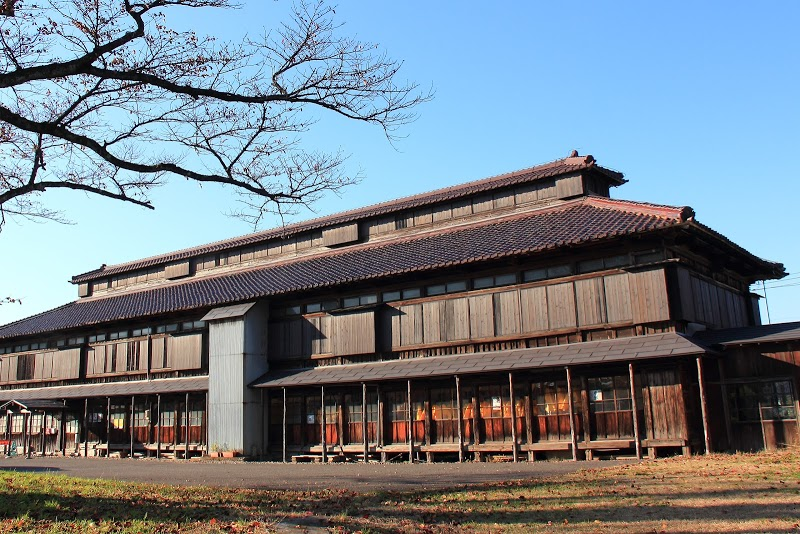
- Matsugaoka kaikonjo

- Matsugaoka reclamation site Matsugaoka Land Reclamation Area (Japan)
- 38°42′01″N 139°53′10″E
- Location: Tsuruoka, Yamagata, Japan
- National Historic Site of Japan

Matsugaoka reclamation site (松ヶ岡開墾場, Matsugaoka kaikonjō) was a cooperative farm on reclaimed land in Meiji period Japan, for the production of silk thread and cloth. Its location, in the modern city of Tsuruoka, Yamagata, became a National Historic Site of Japan in 1989.

== Overview ==
After the Meiji restoration and the abolition of the han system, a former karō of Shōnai Domain and former Imperial governor of the short-lived Sakata Prefecture, Suge Mitsuhide, started a large-scale raw silk cooperative farm in Fujishima Village, in what is now the city of Tsuruoka. The production of raw silk was targeted by the new Meiji government as an industry of critical importance as it was a cash crop much in demand overseas and thus a major supply of much-needed foreign exchange by the new government. Shōnai Domain has sided against the government in the Boshin War, and faced severe financial and unemployment issues.

In 1872, Suge had the honjin of the former post station relocated and initially hired 360 former samurai of Shōnai Domain in the endeavor, which he organized into six companies. Initially, they began to cultivate the riverside of Akagawa, in the eastern suburbs of Tsuruoka. Later that year, he organized an additional 3,000 former samurai into 34 companies and started the clearing of 106 hectares at Gotayama at the foot of Mount Gassan. This involved the clearing of a large amount of forest and replanting it with mulberry trees, the source of food for silkworms. The former daimyō of Shōnai Domain, Sakai Tadaaki visited the site, and gave it the name of "Matsugaoka". In 1873, and additional 204 hectares of mountain was cleared and the cultivation of tea, another important export crop, was also attempted. In 1874, on 311 hectares of open fields, 551,600 mulberry seedlings were planted. In 1875, the first silkworms were raised and their cocoons shipped to Yokohama. The production of raw silk thread also began. From 1875 to 1877 a total of ten large buildings were constructed for the rearing of the silkworms, and eventually for the production of silk thread and silk cloth, and used roof tiles salvaged from the demolished Tsuruoka Castle. While many similar sericulture businesses were attempted around Japan at that time, none were on such a large scale.

In 1881, the "Matsuoka Company Pledge" was signed by the 458 households who chose to remain with the project. A silk mill was constructed in 1887. In 1947, emperor Hirohito visited the site. Although the demand for silk greatly diminished, especially after World War II, the business still continues in this area with 64 families claiming descent of the original ex-Shōnai samurai pioneers.

One of the sericulture buildings was preserved as a museum as it would have looked during the early Meiji period. In 1989, the building and surrounding area were designated as a National Historical Site. It is located bout 20 minutes by car from Tsuruoka Station on the JR East Uetsu Main Line.

== See also ==
- List of Historic Sites of Japan (Yamagata)
- Chidō Museum
