= Shima ruins =

Japanese archaeological site

- 嶋遺跡 (Japanese)
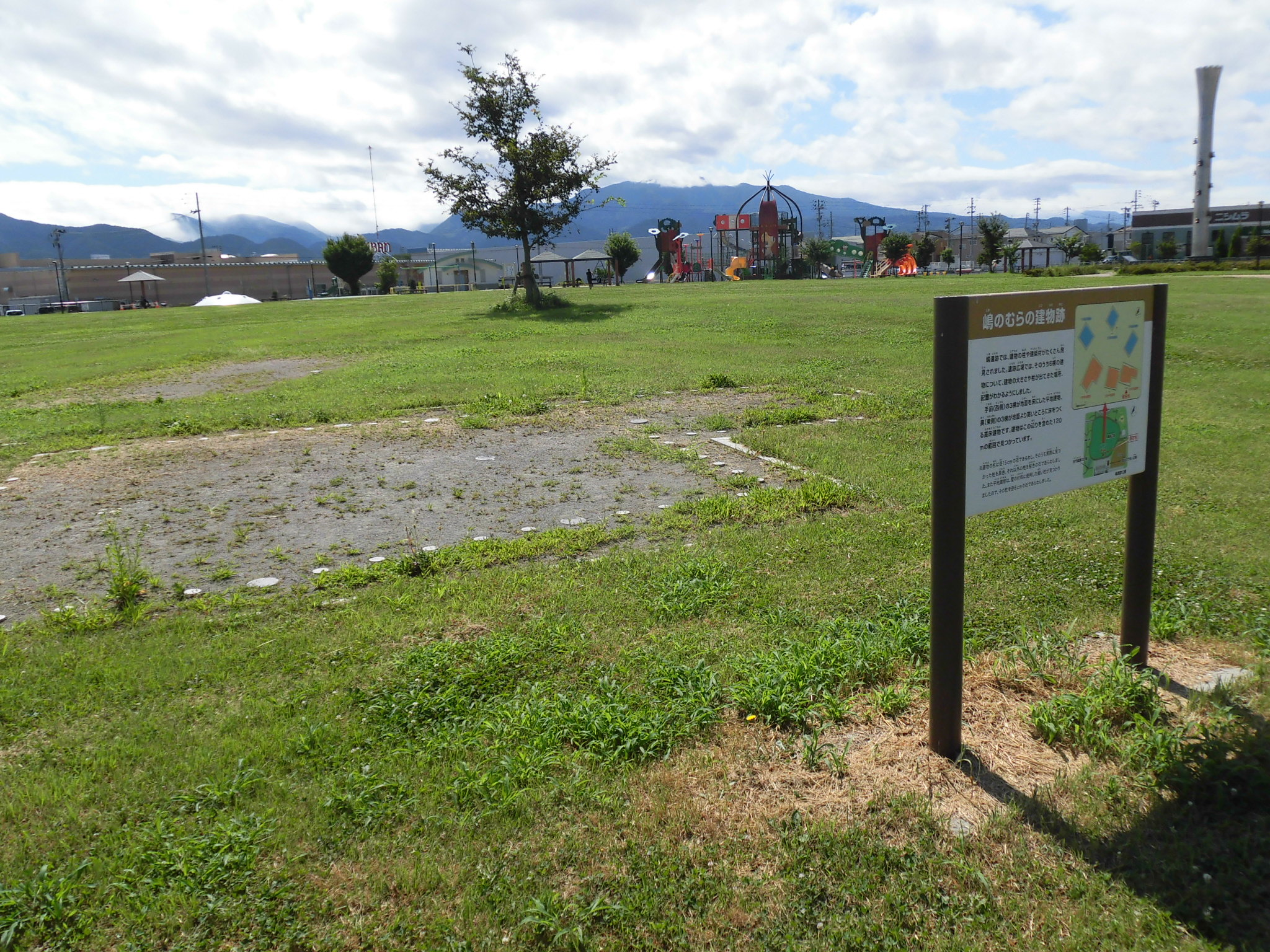
- Shima ruins

- Shima ruins Shima ruins (Japan)
- 38°17′3.4″N 140°19′7.5″E
- Type: settlement
- Periods: Kofun period
- Location: Yamagata, Yamagata, Japan
- Region: Tōhoku region

Site notes
- Area: 3.2 ha (7.9 acres)
- Excavation dates: 1962-1964
- Discovered: 1961
- Public access: None

The Shima ruins (嶋遺跡, Shima iseki) is an archaeological site containing the ruins of a Kofun period (4th to 7th century AD) settlement located in what is now part of the city of Yamagata in the Tōhoku region of northern Japan. The site received protection as a National Historic Site of Japan in 1966.

== Overview ==
The site is located in a rice paddy field approximately four kilometers northwest of Yamagata Station, it is a low-lying swampy area formed by the alluvial fan of the Umamizaki River. It was discovered during an infrastructure maintenance project in 1961.

In the first of six excavations conducted between 1962 and 1964, the foundations of one flat-type and three stilt-type buildings were found. Subsequently, dozens of house and granary foundations over a 3.2-hectare (7.9-acre) area were discovered. Since the area was a lowland and poorly drained, the pillars used in the construction of the buildings were driven deep into the ground, in some cases up to 1.6 meters. This enabled many of their bases to survive while the tops rotted away. In addition to the building foundations, a large number of Haji ware and a smaller number of Sue ware earthenware shards, and horse fittings, wooden farming tools (such as hoes, shovels, forks and geta wooden clogs were found, as well as a large amount of carbonized rice.

The village began to form in the early Kofun period (4th century) from the appearance of the earthenware, and is considered to have reached its peak in the latter period (7th century). The low-oxygen content of the swamps on which the Shima ruins are located helped to preserve these wooden artifacts, which would have normally decayed. The foundation posts were driven deeply into the soil and would have extended three to four meters above ground. An unusual type of magatama beads were also found on the site.

These excavated items are exhibited at the Yamagata Manabi Museum and the Yamagata Prefectural Museum. Part of the site was opened to the public as the Shima Archaeological Park (嶋遺遺跡公園, Nishinumata iseki) and is approximately 25 minutes on foot from the Higashi-Kanai Station on the JR East Aterazawa Line.

== See also ==
- List of Historic Sites of Japan (Yamagata)
