= Chidōkan (Tsuruoka) =

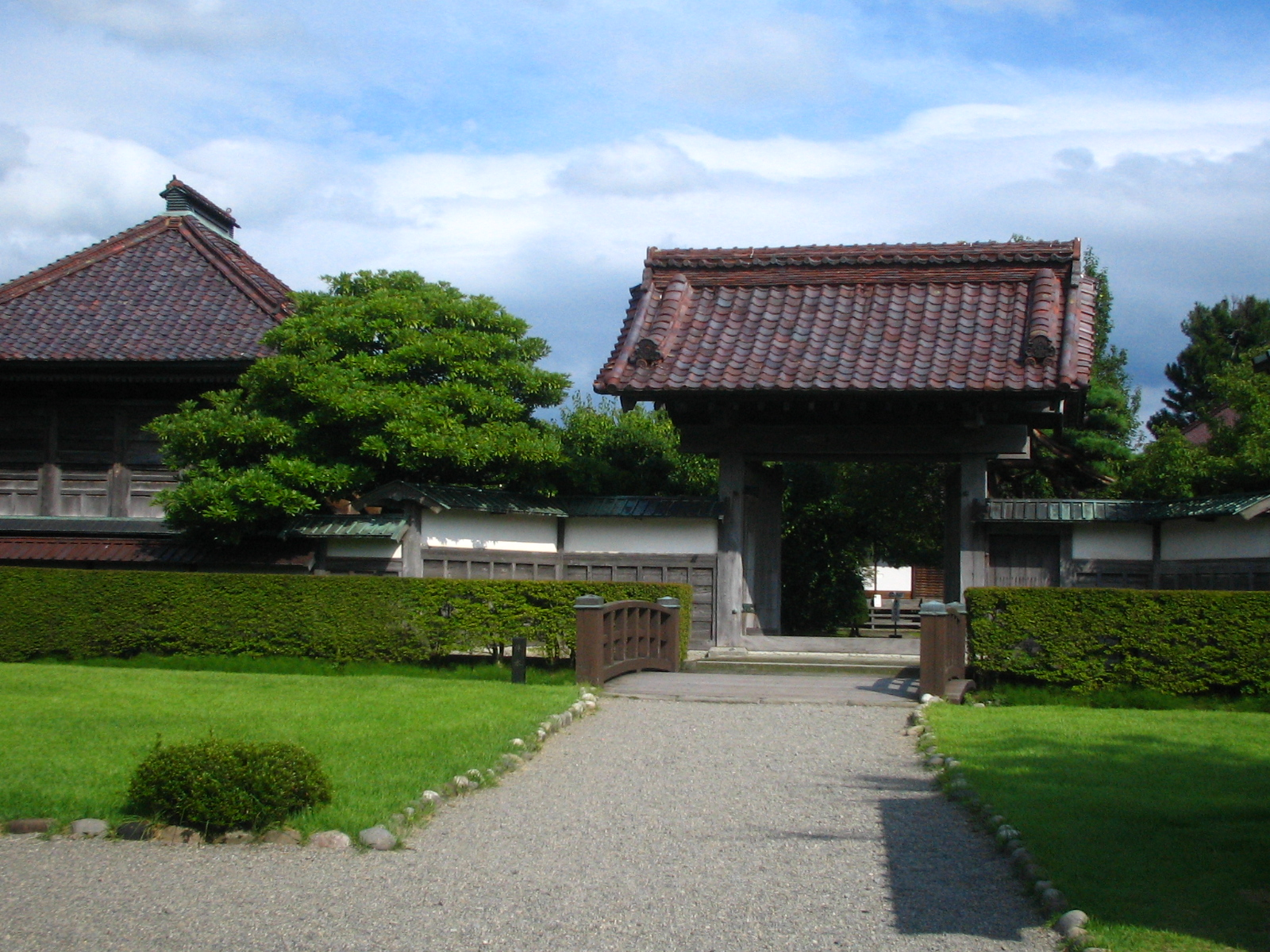
- Chidōkan Main Gate

Location
- Tsuruoka, Yamagata; Japan; 38°43′34.4″N 139°49′35.2″E

Information
- Type: han school
- Founder: Sakai Tadaari
- Closed: 1873
- National Historic Site of Japan

The Chidōkan (致道館) was the Domain academy of Shōnai Domain under the Edo period Tokugawa shogunate located in what is now part of the city of Tsuruoka in the Tōhoku region of northern Japan. It is one of over 250 han schools which existed in Japan during the Bakumatsu period, it is one of the few to retain some of its original structures. It was designated a National Historic Site of Japan in 1951.

== Overview ==
The Chidōkan was established by the 7th daimyō of Shōnai, Sakai Tadaari in 1805. Originally located in Hiyoshi-cho in the Tsuruoka jōkamachi, it was relocated to within the Third Bailey of Tsuruoka Castle by the 8th daimyō of Shōnai, Sakai Tadakata in 1816. It was abolished in 1873, two years after the Abolition of the han system by the Meiji government.

The school taught a combination of traditional Chinese literature, Ogasawara-ryū etiquette, Chinese medicine and martial arts alongside Confucianism.

It is the only surviving han school in the Tōhoku region. Restoration work began in 1965 and it has been open to the public since 1972.

There were han schools with the same name in Tosa Domain and Ogaki Domain.

== See also ==
- List of Historic Sites of Japan (Yamagata)
