= Kinowanosaku =

Castle ruins in Sakata, Yamagata, Japan

Kiwanosaku
- 城輪柵 (Japanese)
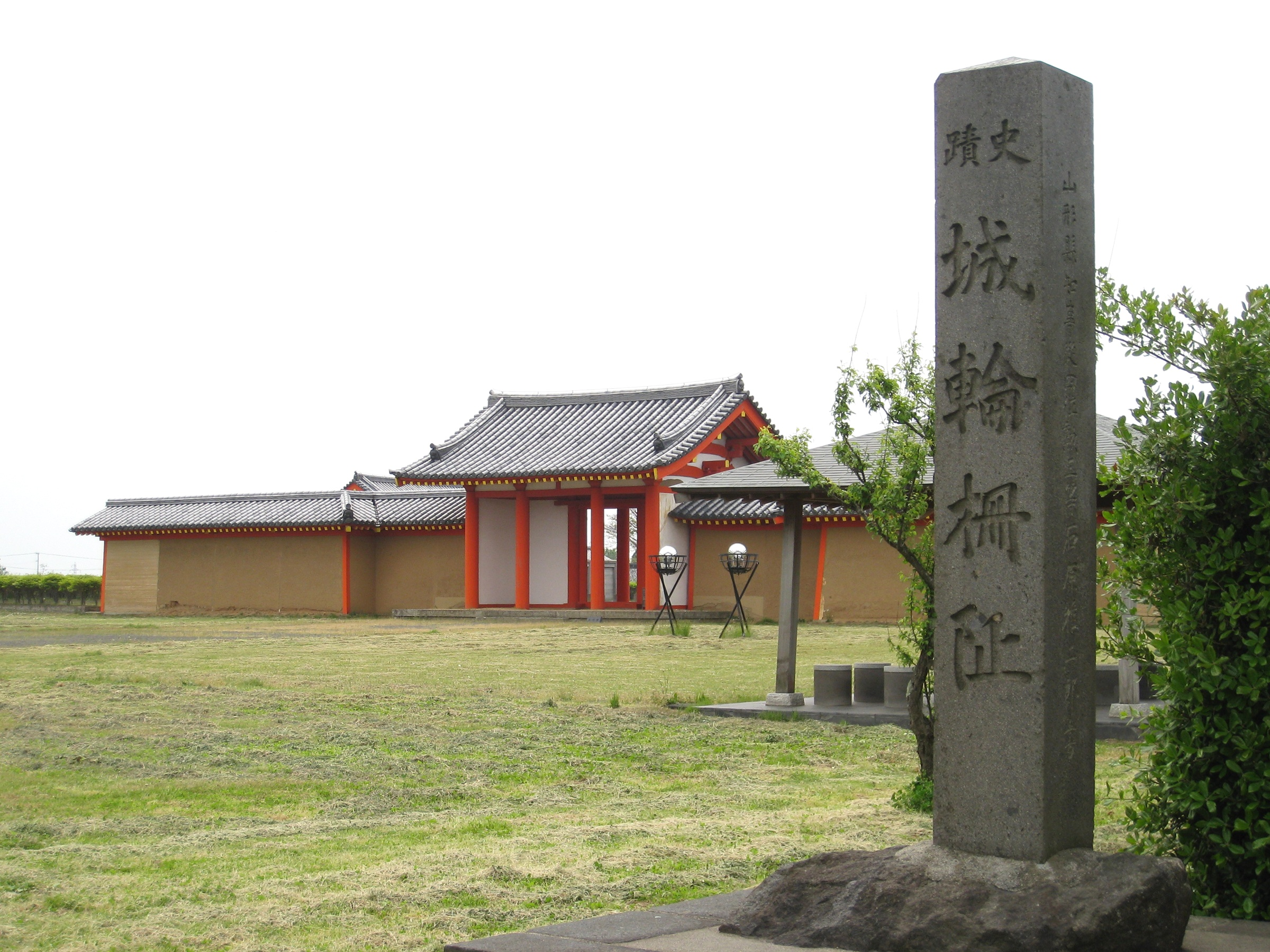
- Restored east gate

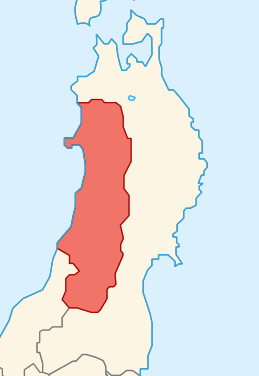
- Kiwanosaku Kinowanosaku (Dewa, Japan) Kinowanosaku (Japan)
- 38°57′49.0″N 139°54′33.2″E
- Periods: Nara to Heian period
- Location: Sakata, Yamagata, Japan
- Region: Tōhoku region

History
- Built: 8th -10th century AD

Site notes
- Public access: Yes (archeological park)

Kiwanosaku (城輪柵, Kiwanosaku) was a late Nara period though Heian period josaku-style Japanese castle located in what is now part of the town of Sakata, Yamagata Prefecture in the Tōhoku region of Japan. Its ruins are now an archaeological site and have been protected by the central government as a National Historic Site since 1932.

== History ==
In the late Nara period, after the establishment of a centralized government under the Ritsuryō system, the imperial court sent a number of military expeditions to what later became Dewa Province of northern Japan to bring the local Emishi tribes under its control. After the establishment of Akita Castle on a Japan Sea coast, Yamato forces gradually pushed into the hinterland of what is now Akita Prefecture and Yamagata Prefecture, establishing several fortified settlements against increasing Emishi opposition, and building civil administrative centers. The provincial capital of Dewa Province was relocated from Akita Castle to this location towards the end of the Nara period. The building remained in use for approximately 400 years, but is not known when they were abandoned and allowed to fall into ruin.

== Description ==
The site is located in the alluvial fan of the Arase River in the northern part of the Shōnai Plain, about six kilometers north of Mogami River. It was a roughly square enclosure, approximately 720 meters on each side, consisting of an earthen rampart surmounted by a wooden palisade, and protected by a dry moat. There was a gate on each of the four sides, with roads converging on an inner enclosure, 115 meters on a side, housing the buildings which formed the government administrative complex. The main gate was in the south and the road between the gate and the central enclosure had a width of nine meters.

It has been known since the Edo period that there are ruins existed in the rice paddy fields in this area, but the first archaeological investigation was not conducted until 1931. During the 1931 excavation, remnants of the wooden palisade with squared timbers with widths of 25 centimeters were found. In the 1964 to 1965 excavation, the foundations of pit dwellings, and the foundations of the main hall, a side hall and the South Gate were discovered. Artifacts included roof tiles. some with a lotus design, others with a Tomoe or an arabesque design were found. It was determined from the ruins that government buildings were rebuilt at least four times based on their architectural style, earlier buildings having supporting pillars buried directly in the ground, and later buildings having foundation stones. Further studies were conducted in 1971, and the area under the National Historic Site designation was expanded in 1981.

In 1984, a number of buildings were reconstructed, and the site was opened to the public as an archaeological park. It is located about 20 minutes by bus from Sakata Station on the JR East Uetsu Main Line.

== See also ==
- List of Historic Sites of Japan (Yamagata)
