= Yonezawa Castle =

Building in Yamagata Prefecture, Japan

Coordinates: 37°54′34.62″N 140°06′18.52″E

Yonezawa Castle 米沢城
- Yonezawa, Yamagata Prefecture, Japan
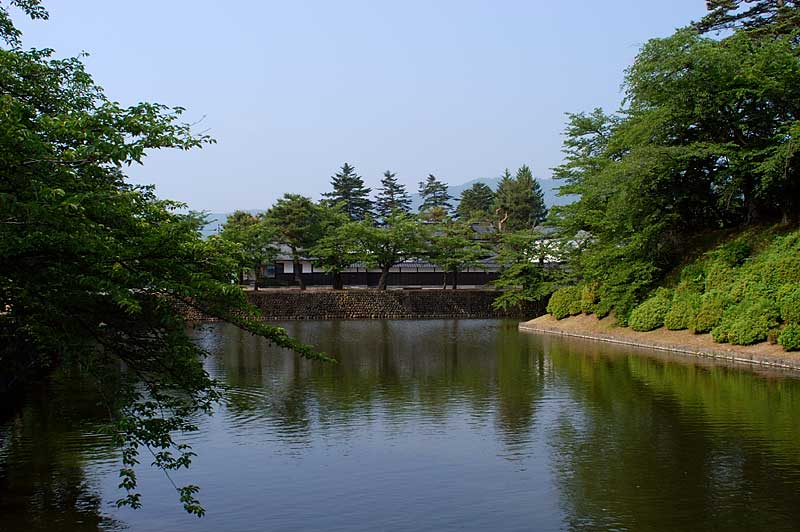
- Moats of Yonezawa Castle

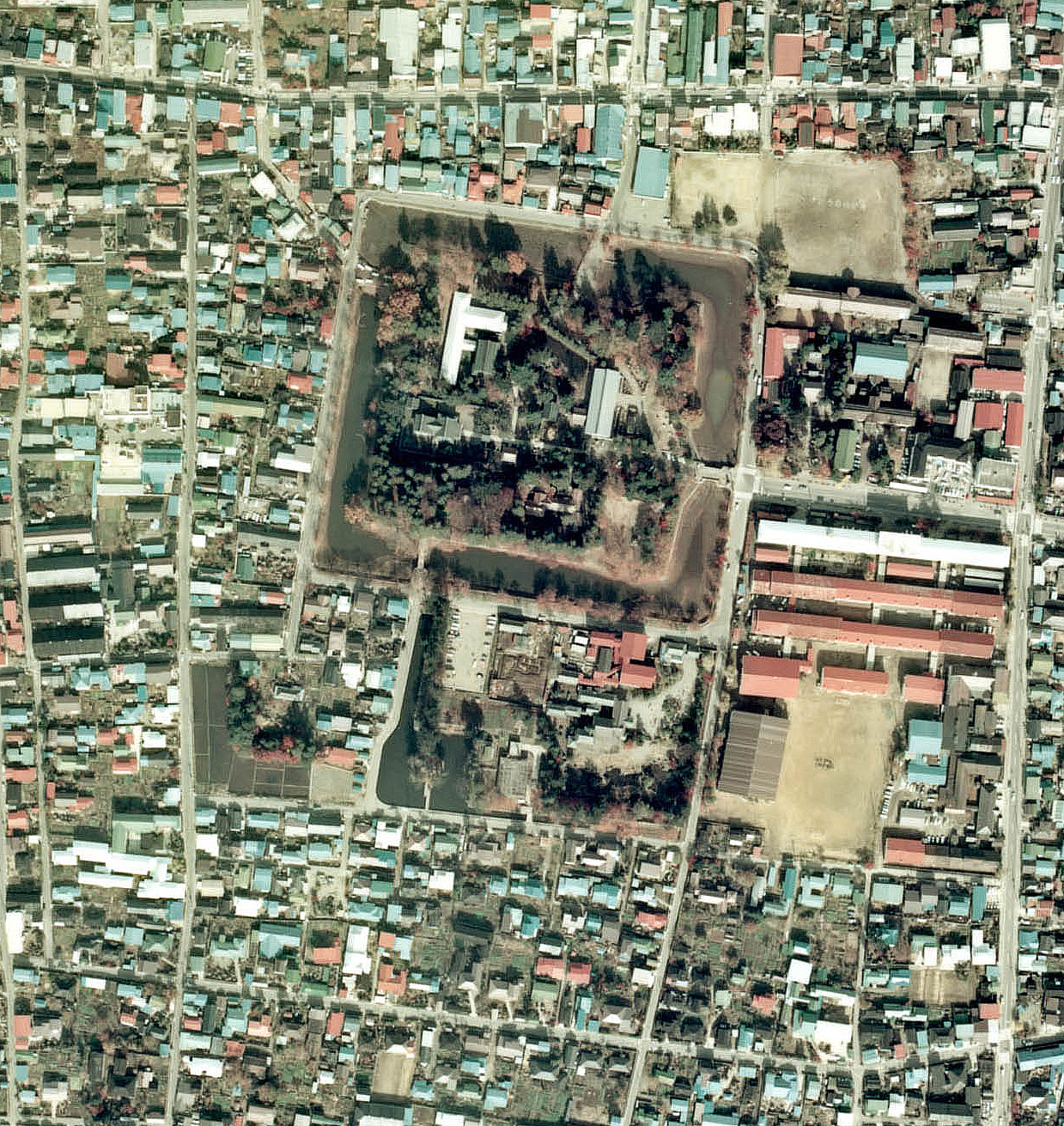
- Yonezawa Castle from the air, 1972

Site information
- Type: flatland-style Japanese castle
- Open to the public: yes

Location
- Location within Yamagata Prefecture Location within Japan

Site history
- Built: 1238, rebuilt 1608-1613
- Built by: Uesugi Kagekatsu
- In use: Edo period
- Demolished: 1873

Yonezawa Castle (米沢城, Yonezawa-jō) is a flatland-style Japanese castle located in the center of the city of Yonezawa, southern Yamagata Prefecture, Japan. Throughout the Edo period, Yonezawa Castle was home to the Uesugi clan, daimyō of Yonezawa Domain.

== History ==
The first castle on this site dates to the middle of the Kamakura period. Ōe Tokihiro, the younger son of Ōe no Hiromoto, a senior retainer of the Kamakura shogunate was granted lands in Dewa Province, and in 1238 changed his name to Nagai Tokihiro. The Nagai continued to rule for about 150 years. The Nagai were supplanted in the Sengoku period by the Date clan, and the famed warlord Date Masamune was born at Yonezawa Castle. After Date Masamune defeated the Ashina clan in 1589, he moved his main castle to Kurokawa Castle in Aizu and put Date Munekiyo in charge of Yonezawa. However, Toyotomi Hideyoshi did not agree, and forced Masamune to move back to Yonezawa. In 1591, Masamune relocated to Iwadeyama Castle by orders of Hideyoshi, surrendering Yonezawa Castle to Gamō Ujisato. When Ujisato’s son, Gamō Hideyuki was moved to Utsunomiya in 1597, the castle was turned over to Uesugi Kagekatsu, as part of their vast 1,200,000 koku holdings based in Aizu. The castellan at this time was Naoe Kanetsugu.

However, after the Battle of Sekigahara, the Uesugi were stripped of most of their holdings by Tokugawa Ieyasu, and were reduced to a 300,000 koku domain centered on Yonezawa. From 1608-1613, the Uesugi completely renovated the castle. However, due to the reduction in size of their holdings as compared with Aizu and the suspicion with which the clan was viewed by the Tokugawa shogunate, the defensive earthen works were not faced with stone, and donjon was kept to a modest three-stories. The Uesugi also relocated the grave of their founder, Uesugi Kenshin from Echigo Province to within the walls of Yonezawa Castle. In 1664, the clan revenues were halved to 150,000 koku, forcing it to lay off many samurai, and for many others to take up part-time farming. However, the castle remained in the hands of the Uesugi clan until the Meiji restoration.

With the Abolition of the han system in 1871, Yonezawa Domain became Yonezawa Prefecture, and in 1872 Uesugi Shrine, honoring the ancestors of the Uesugi clan, was established within the grounds of the castle. All remaining structures were demolished in 1873 and in the second bailey, the present-day Yonezawa city hall was constructed. The main bailey was transformed into a public park in 1874. The Uesugi Shrine was transferred to its present location on top of the site of the donjon in 1876.

== Uesugi Shrine ==
Uesugi Shrine
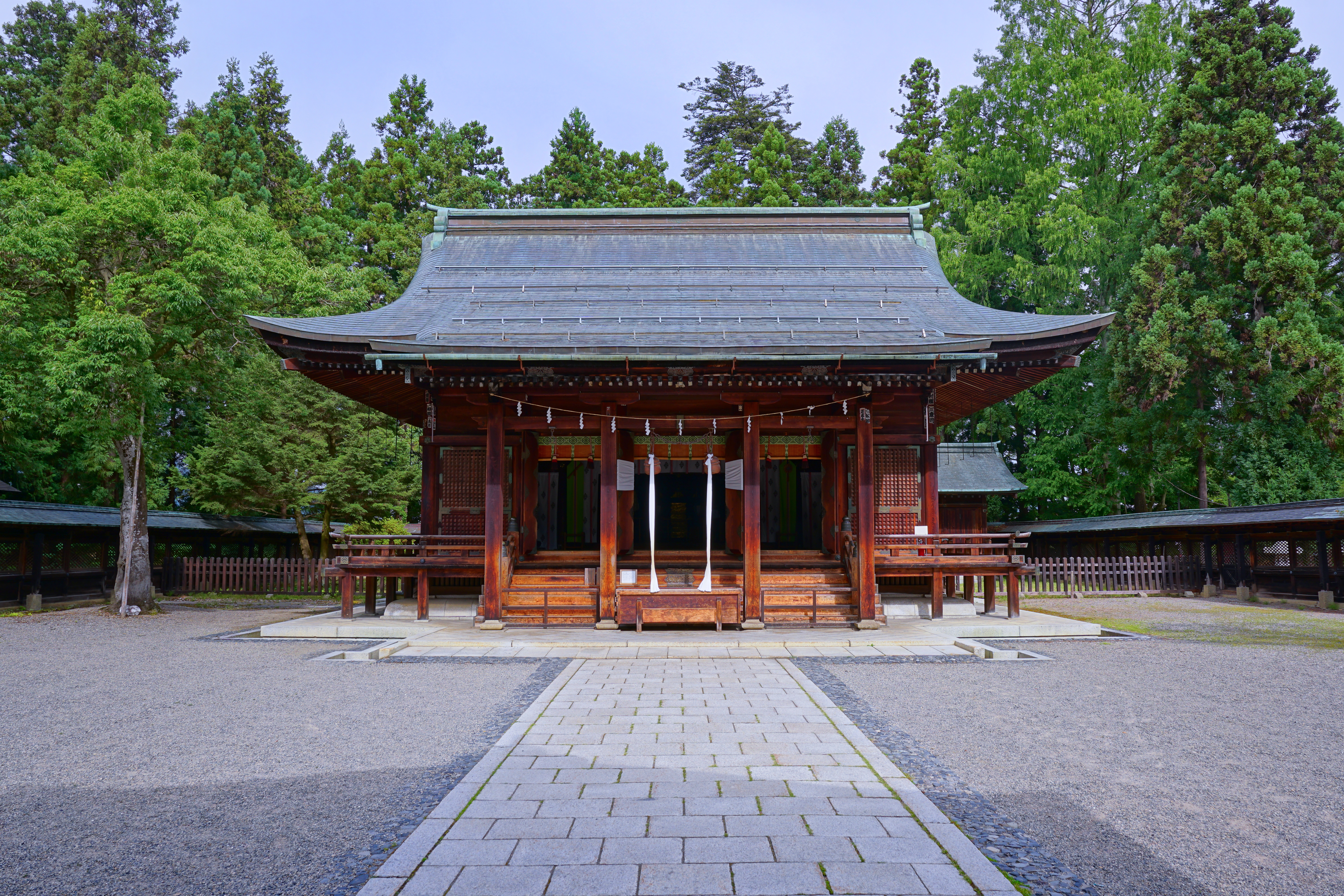

Religion
- Affiliation: Shinto
- Deity: Uesugi Kenshin

Location
- Interactive map of Uesugi Shrine

Uesugi Shrine is a Beppyo shrine in Yonezawa, Yamagata. It is dedicated to Uesugi Kenshin, a historical Japanese military leader. In February lanterns are carved from snow for the snow lantern festival It was built on the site of Yonezawa Castle in 1876
