= Ashisawa Station =

Railway station in Obanazawa, Yamagata Prefecture, Japan

Ashisawa Station 芦沢駅
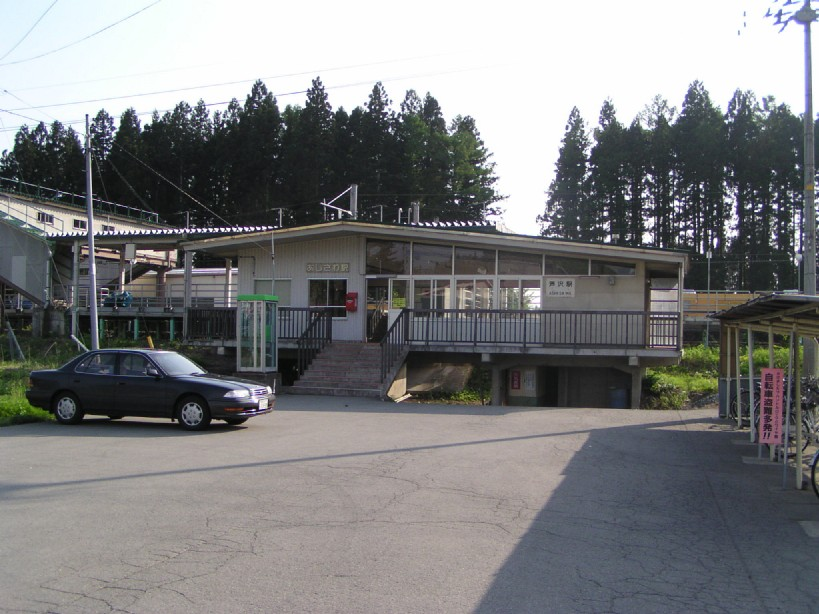
- Ashisawa Station, May 2005

General information
- Location: 1012 Ashizawa, Obanazawa-shi, Yamagata-ken 999-4554; Japan
- Coordinates: 38°39′20″N 140°21′40″E
- Operator: JR East
- Line: ■ Ōu Main Line
- Distance: 133.7 km from Fukushima
- Platforms: 2 side platforms

Other information
- Status: Staffed
- Website: Official website

History
- Opened: December 1, 1916

Passengers
- FY2018: 56

Services
| Preceding station | JR East | Following station |
|---|---|---|
| Kita-Ōishida towards Fukushima | Yamagata Line | Funagata towards Shinjō |
Location
- Location within Yamagata Prefecture Location within Japan

Ashisawa Station (芦沢駅, Ashisawa-eki) is a railway station located in the city of Obanazawa, Yamagata Prefecture, Japan, operated by East Japan Railway Company (JR East).

== Lines ==
Ashisawa Station is served by the Ōu Main Line, and is located 133.7 rail kilometers from the terminus of the line at Fukushima Station.

== Station layout ==
Ashisawa station has two opposed side platforms, connected to the station building by a footbridge. The station is staffed.

=== Platforms ===
| 1 | ■ Ōu Main Line | for Yamagata, Murakami |
| 2 | ■ Ōu Main Line | for Shinjō |

== History ==
Ashisawa Station opened on December 1, 1916. The station was absorbed into the JR East network upon the privatization of the JNR on April 1, 1987.

== Passenger statistics ==
In fiscal 2018, the JR portion of the station was used by an average of 45 passengers daily (boarding passengers only).

== Surrounding area ==
Although located within the city limits of Obanazawa, Ashisawa Station is located in a rural area isolated from the city center by a range of mountains. The station of Ōishida in the neighboring town of Ōishida is much more convenient to the city center.

- Mogami River
- National Route 13

== See also ==
- List of railway stations in Japan
