= Obanazawa =

Obanazawa 尾花沢市
- City
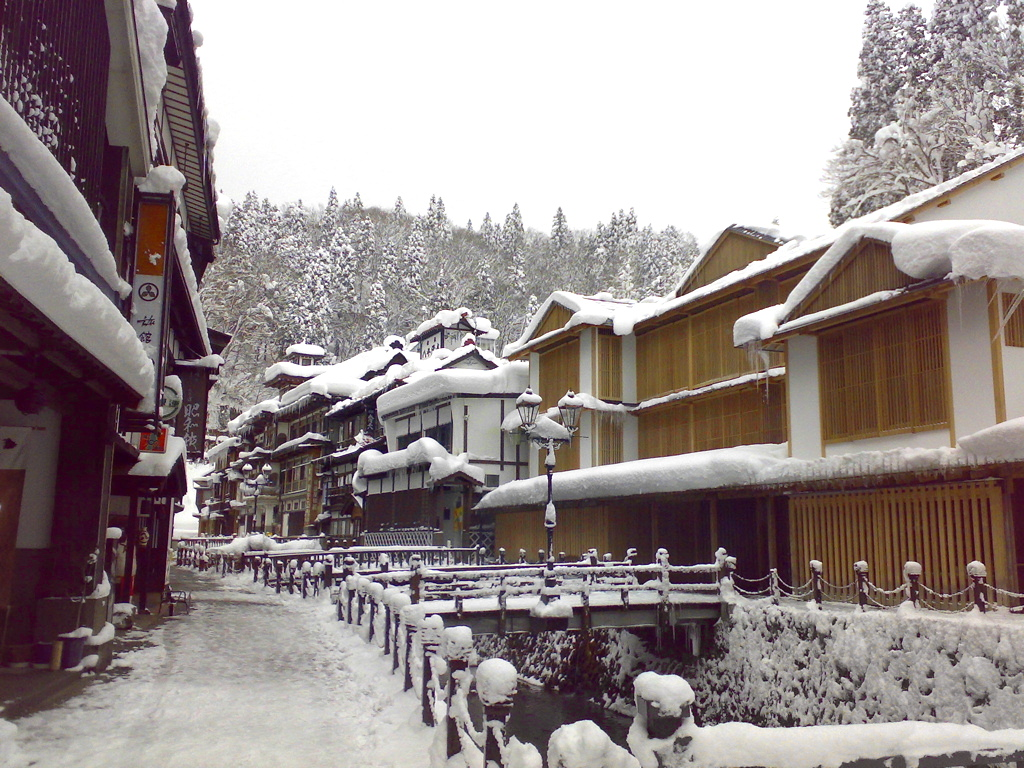
- Ginzan Onsen in the snow

- Flag Seal

- Location of Obanazawa in Yamagata Prefecture

- Coordinates: 38°36′N 140°24′E
- Country: Japan
- Region: Tōhoku
- Prefecture: Yamagata

Area
  - Total: 373.32 km^{2} (144.14 sq mi)

Population (January 2020)
  - Total: 15,237
  - Density: 40.815/km^{2} (105.71/sq mi)
- Time zone: UTC+9 (Japan Standard Time)
- Phone number: 0237-22-1111
- Address: 1-1-3 Wakabachō, Obanazawa-shi, Yamagata-ken 999-4292
- Climate: Cfa/Dfa
- Website: Official website
- Symbols
- Flower: Azalea
- Tree: Japanese Zelkova

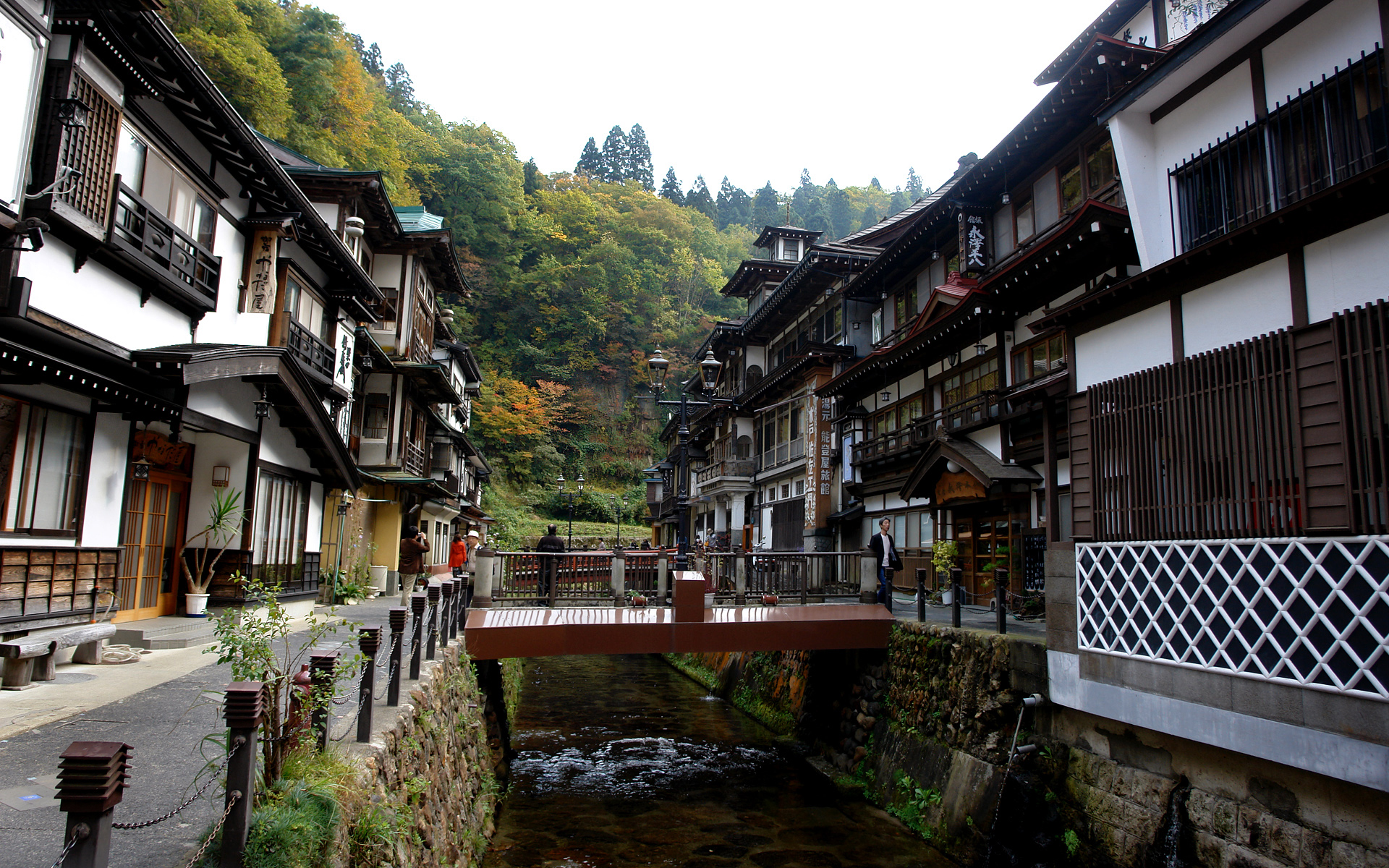
Obanazawa

Obanazawa (尾花沢市, Obanazawa-shi; Japanese pronunciation: [ò̞.bä́.nä́.(d͡)zä̀.β̞ä̀, -(d͡)zä́.β̞ä́.ɕì]) is a city located in Yamagata Prefecture, Japan. As of 1 February 2020, the city had an estimated population of 15,237, and a population density of 40.9 persons per km^{2}. The total area of the city is 372.32 square kilometres (144 sq mi).

== Geography ==
Obanazawa is located in a mountain valley northeast Yamagata Prefecture, bordered by the Mogami River to the west and the Ōu Mountains to the east.

=== Neighboring municipalities ===
- Miyagi Prefecture
  - Sendai
  - Kami
- Yamagata Prefecture
  - Funagata
  - Higashine
  - Mogami
  - Murayama
  - Ōishida

== Climate ==
Obanazawa has a humid continental climate (Köppen climate classification Dfa) with large seasonal temperature differences, with warm to hot (and often humid) summers and cold (sometimes severely cold) winters. Precipitation is significant throughout the year, but is heaviest from August to October. The average annual temperature in Obanazawa is 10.8 °C (51.4 °F). The average annual rainfall is 1,538.5 mm (60.57 in) with December as the wettest month. The temperatures are highest on average in August, at around 23.7 °C (74.7 °F), and lowest in January, at around −1.0 °C (30.2 °F). The city is noted for its very heavy snowfall in winter.

Climate data for Obanazawa (elevation 106 m, 1991–2020 normals, extremes 1976–present)
Month	Jan	Feb	Mar	Apr	May	Jun	Jul	Aug	Sep	Oct	Nov	Dec	Year
Record high °C (°F)	11.9 (53.4)	17.5 (63.5)	20.0 (68.0)	29.0 (84.2)	33.4 (92.1)	33.3 (91.9)	36.2 (97.2)	35.9 (96.6)	34.6 (94.3)	28.8 (83.8)	23.7 (74.7)	18.7 (65.7)	36.2 (97.2)
Mean daily maximum °C (°F)	1.7 (35.1)	2.7 (36.9)	6.4 (43.5)	14.0 (57.2)	20.4 (68.7)	23.8 (74.8)	26.9 (80.4)	28.4 (83.1)	24.5 (76.1)	18.2 (64.8)	11.0 (51.8)	4.2 (39.6)	15.2 (59.4)
Daily mean °C (°F)	−1.0 (30.2)	−0.7 (30.7)	2.1 (35.8)	8.2 (46.8)	14.6 (58.3)	19.0 (66.2)	22.5 (72.5)	23.7 (74.7)	19.6 (67.3)	13.1 (55.6)	6.6 (43.9)	1.3 (34.3)	10.8 (51.4)
Mean daily minimum °C (°F)	−4.1 (24.6)	−4.3 (24.3)	−2.1 (28.2)	2.8 (37.0)	9.3 (48.7)	14.9 (58.8)	19.1 (66.4)	19.9 (67.8)	15.5 (59.9)	8.5 (47.3)	2.6 (36.7)	−1.5 (29.3)	6.7 (44.1)
Record low °C (°F)	−16.3 (2.7)	−15.5 (4.1)	−12.3 (9.9)	−7.6 (18.3)	−0.9 (30.4)	5.3 (41.5)	5.8 (42.4)	10.2 (50.4)	3.4 (38.1)	−1.0 (30.2)	−7.4 (18.7)	−17.4 (0.7)	−17.4 (0.7)
Average precipitation mm (inches)	165.3 (6.51)	98.4 (3.87)	80.7 (3.18)	68.4 (2.69)	78.4 (3.09)	105.6 (4.16)	174.0 (6.85)	148.9 (5.86)	128.9 (5.07)	120.5 (4.74)	155.2 (6.11)	197.1 (7.76)	1,538.5 (60.57)
Average snowfall cm (inches)	322 (127)	231 (91)	145 (57)	17 (6.7)	0 (0)	0 (0)	0 (0)	0 (0)	0 (0)	0 (0)	18 (7.1)	216 (85)	948 (373)
Average precipitation days (≥ 1.0 mm)	23.2	19.3	16.6	11.8	10.4	10.0	12.7	11.8	12.5	13.7	17.6	22.2	182.5
Mean monthly sunshine hours	38.0	62.0	108.3	169.4	200.0	179.0	154.6	188.5	141.7	119.5	83.6	40.8	1,485.3
Source: Japan Meteorological Agency (1991–2020 normals, extremes 1976–present)

== Demographics ==
Per Japanese census data, the population of Obanazawa peaked around 1950 and has declined considerably since then.

Historical population
Year	Pop.	±%
1920	21,517	—
1930	24,320	+13.0%
1940	26,692	+9.8%
1950	33,754	+26.5%
1960	31,538	−6.6%
1970	27,173	−13.8%
1980	25,231	−7.1%
1990	23,909	−5.2%
2000	22,010	−7.9%
2010	18,955	−13.9%
2020	14,971	−21.0%

== History ==
The area of present-day Obanazawa was part of ancient Dewa Province. After the start of the Meiji period, the area became part of Kitamurayama District, Yamagata Prefecture. The village of Obanazawa was established on April 1, 1889 with the establishment of the modern municipalities system, and was raised to town status on July 26, 1897. It was made a city on April 10, 1959.

Obanazawa is the origin of one version of the Dontsuki song, the 'Hanagasa Dance Song', a song sung in many parts of Yamagata Prefecture.

== Government ==
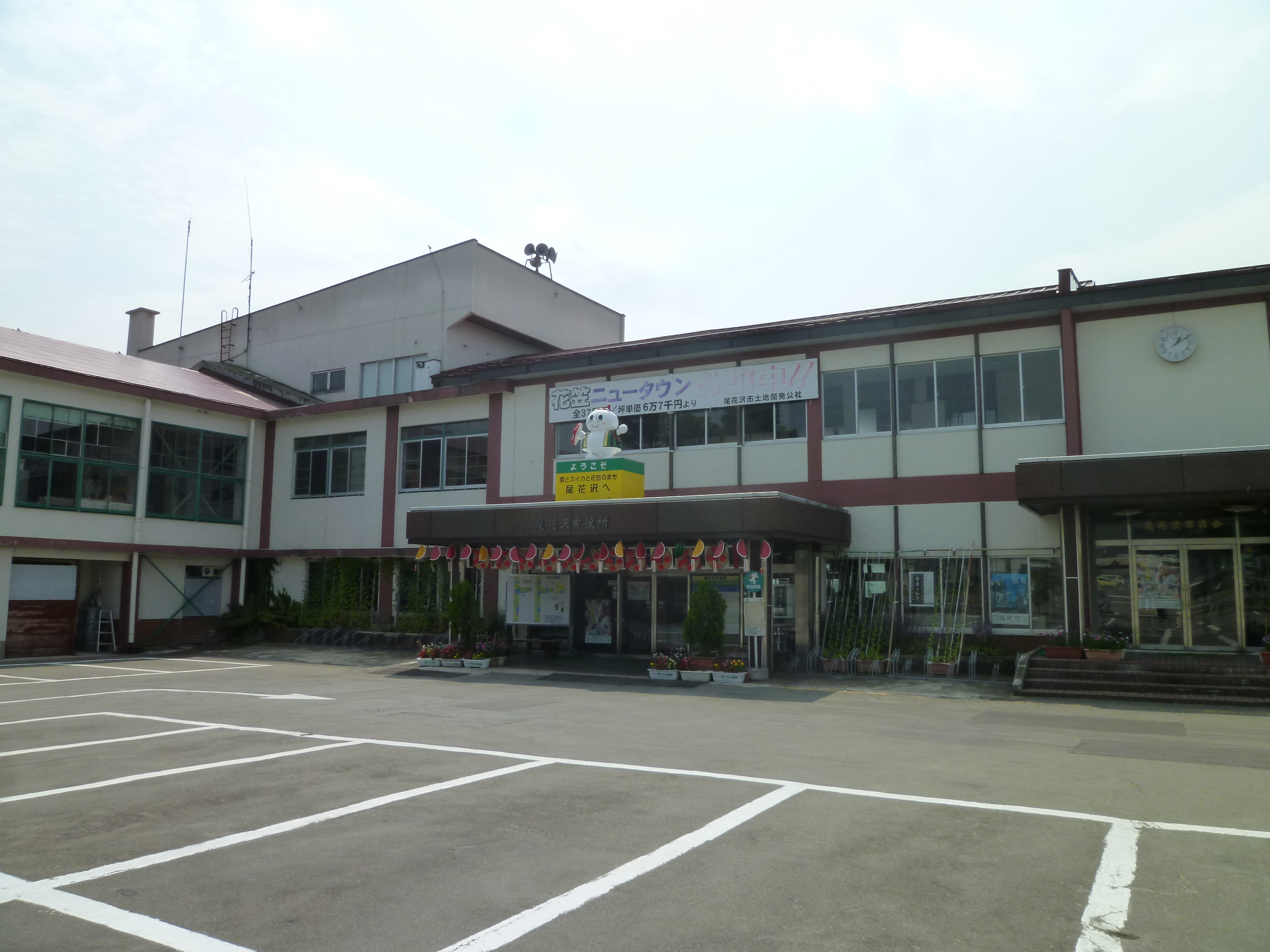
Obanazawa City Hall

Obanazawa has a mayor-council form of government with a directly elected mayor and a unicameral city legislature of 14 members. The city contributes one member to the Yamagata Prefectural Assembly. In terms of national politics, the city is part of Yamagata District 2 of the lower house of the Diet of Japan.

== Economy ==
The economy of Obanazawa is based on agriculture and forestry. In agriculture, Obanazawa is best known for its watermelons.

== Education ==
Obanazawa has four public elementary schools and two public middle schools operated by the city government and one public high school operated by the Yamagata Prefectural Board of Education.

== Transportation ==
=== Railway ===
East Japan Railway Company - Ōu Main Line

- Ashisawa (However, central Obanazawa is also served by Ōishida Station in neighboring Ōishida).

=== Highway ===
- Tōhoku-Chūō Expressway – Obanazawa Interchange
- National Route 13
- National Route 347

== Local attractions ==
- Ginzan Onsen
- Nobesawa Ginzan, a National Historic Site

== Noted people ==
- Norio Sasaki, Japan national women's soccer team head coach
- Kotonowaka Terumasa, sumo wrestler
