= Nobesawa Ginzan =

Nobesawa silver mine 延沢銀山
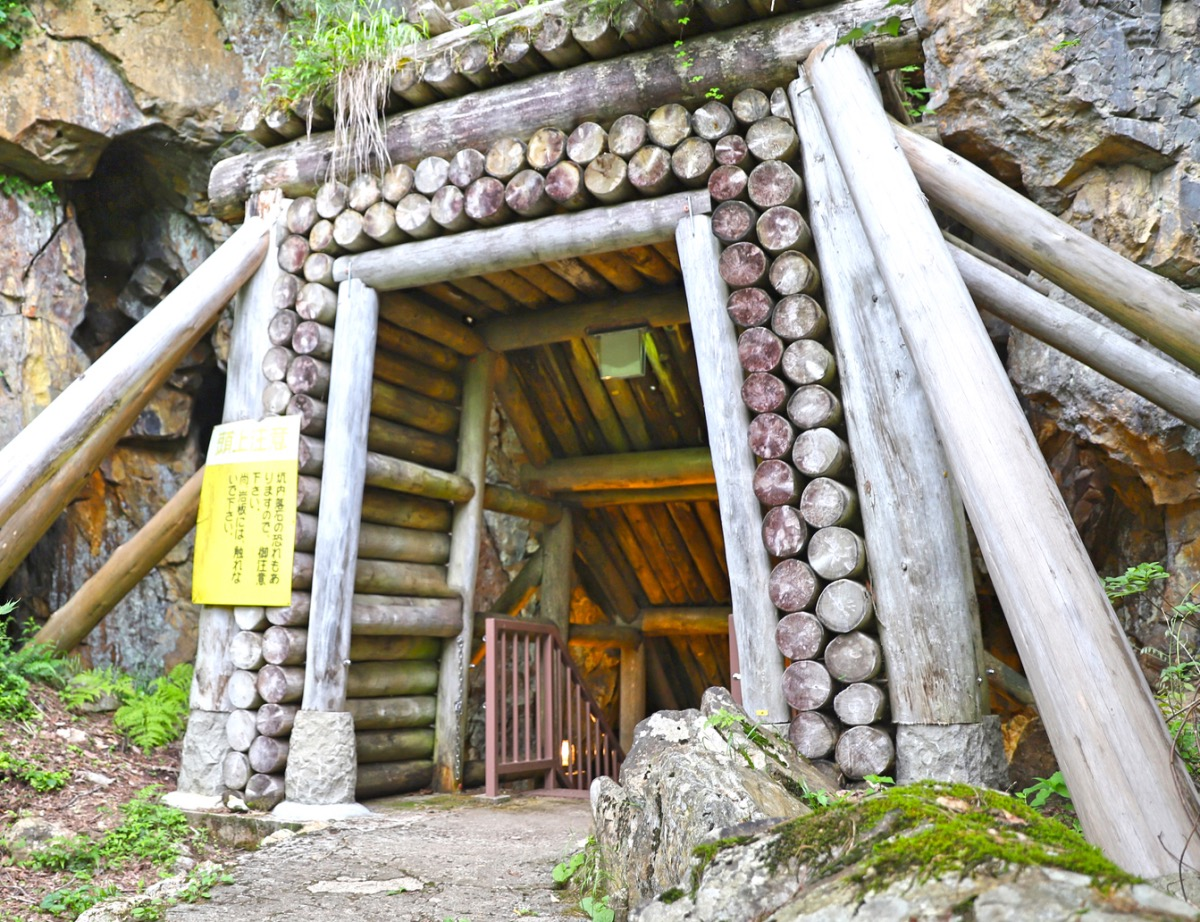
- Nobesawa Ginzan entrance

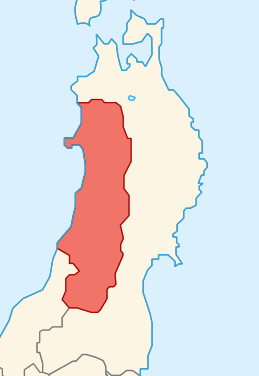
- Location within Yamagata Prefecture Location within Dewa, Japan Location within Japan
- Location: Obanazawa, Yamagata, Japan; 38°34′15″N 140°27′57″E
- Products: Silver
- Opened: 1457
- Closed: 1689 or 1703
- National Historic Site of Japan

Nobesawa silver mine (延沢銀山, Nobesawa ginzan) was a silver mine, located in what is now part of the city of Obanazawa, Yamagata in the Tōhoku region of northern Japan. It is now closed, and the site was designated a National Historic Site of Japan in 1966.

== Overview ==
The Nobesawa silver mine was opened in 1457, during the Muromachi period of Japanese history, during the reign of Emperor Hanazono. During the Sengoku period, the mine came under the control of Mogami Yoshiaki, and silver from the mine helped to finance his battles against the Date clan. Silver from the mine was paid as tribute to Toyotomi Hideyoshi in 1598, at which time it was claimed that the output of the mine rivaled that of the Iwami Ginzan Silver Mine. After the establishment of the Edo period Tokugawa shogunate, the Mogami were dispossessed, and the mine came under the control of Torii Tadamasa, the daimyō of Yamagata Domain. The Torii clan expanded operations at the mine, opening a new shaft and employing more miners. However, after 1636 the mine came under the direct control of the shogunate. Peak production was achieved during the Kan'ei era (1624–1645). In 1640, the peasants in Yonezawa Domain were filing complaints and petitions against the shogunate, as runoff from the mine was ruining their fields. During the Keian era (1651–1652), the output of the mine had dropped to only half of what it was at its peak, and operations were increasingly hampered by groundwater seepage. From 1671 to 1675, large-scale drainage projects were undertaken, but without success, and the mine was thereafter abandoned in either 1689 or 1703.

The site is about a 20-minute walk from the "Ginzan Onsen" bus stop on the Osarizawa Municipal Bus from Oshida Station on the JR East Ōu Main Line.

== See also ==
- List of Historic Sites of Japan (Yamagata)
