= Murayama, Yamagata =

Murayama 村山市
- City
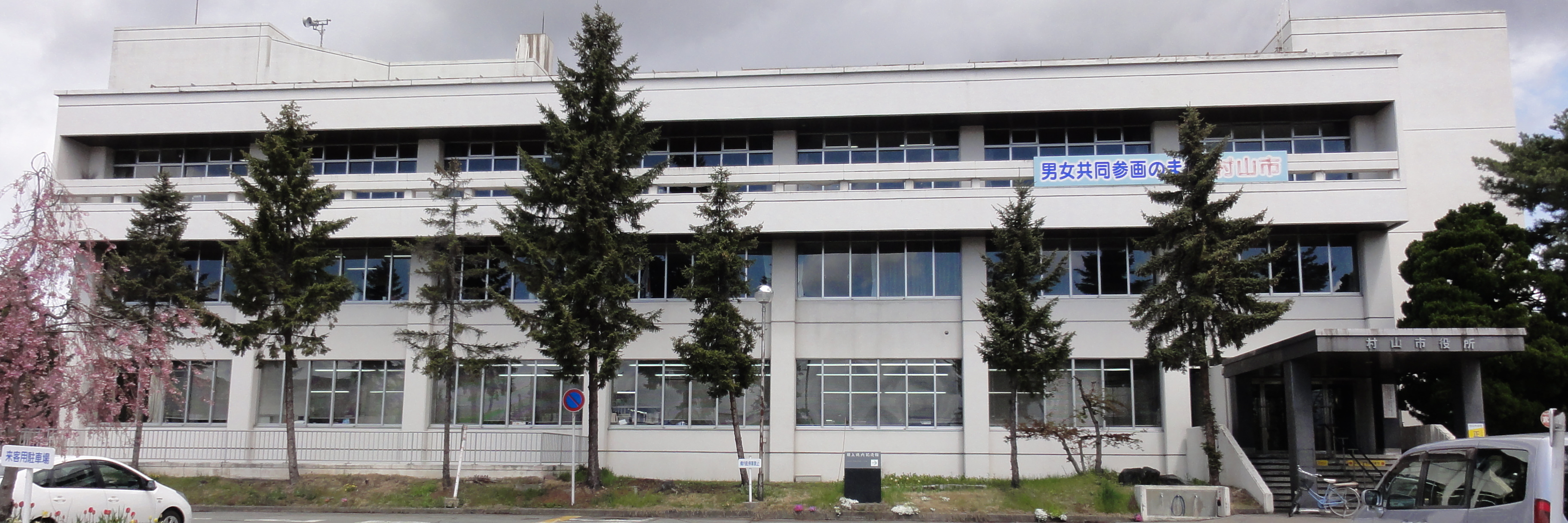
- Murayama City Hall

- Flag Emblem

- Location of Murayama in Yamagata Prefecture

- Coordinates: 38°29′N 140°23′E
- Country: Japan
- Region: Tōhoku
- Prefecture: Yamagata

Area
  - Total: 196.98 km^{2} (76.05 sq mi)

Population (October 2015)
  - Total: 23,643
  - Density: 120.03/km^{2} (310.87/sq mi)
- Time zone: UTC+9 (Japan Standard Time)
- Phone number: 0237-55-2111
- Address: 1-3-6 Chūō, Murayama-shi, Yamagata-ken 995-8666
- Climate: Cfa/Dfa
- Website: Official website
- Symbols
- Flower: Rose
- Tree: Japanese Red Pine

Murayama (村山市, Murayama-shi) is a city located in Yamagata Prefecture, Japan. As of 1 February 2020, the city had an estimated population of 23,643 in 8133 households, and a population density of 120 persons per km². The total area of the city is 196.98 square kilometres (76 sq mi).

== Geography ==
Murayama is located in northeast Yamagata Prefecture, in a river valley of the Mogami River, with branches of the Ōu Mountains to the east and west.

=== Neighboring municipalities ===
- Yamagata Prefecture
  - Funagata
  - Higashine
  - Kahoku
  - Obanazawa
  - Ōishida
  - Ōkura
  - Sagae

== Climate ==
Murayama has a humid continental climate (Köppen climate classification Dfa) with large seasonal temperature differences, with warm to hot (and often humid) summers and cold (sometimes severely cold) winters. Precipitation is significant throughout the year, but is heaviest from August to October. The average annual temperature in Murayama is 11.2 °C (52.2 °F). The average annual rainfall is 1,250.1 mm (49.22 in) with July as the wettest month. The temperatures are highest on average in August, at around 24.5 °C (76.1 °F), and lowest in January, at around −1.2 °C (29.8 °F).

Climate data for Murayama (elevation 80 m, 2002–2020 normals, extremes 2002–present)
Month	Jan	Feb	Mar	Apr	May	Jun	Jul	Aug	Sep	Oct	Nov	Dec	Year
Record high °C (°F)	12.2 (54.0)	18.3 (64.9)	22.3 (72.1)	29.1 (84.4)	33.6 (92.5)	34.9 (94.8)	37.3 (99.1)	37.7 (99.9)	35.9 (96.6)	30.0 (86.0)	22.7 (72.9)	17.8 (64.0)	37.7 (99.9)
Mean daily maximum °C (°F)	2.2 (36.0)	3.3 (37.9)	8.0 (46.4)	15.5 (59.9)	22.2 (72.0)	25.7 (78.3)	28.0 (82.4)	29.9 (85.8)	25.7 (78.3)	19.1 (66.4)	12.0 (53.6)	5.0 (41.0)	16.4 (61.5)
Daily mean °C (°F)	−1.2 (29.8)	−0.7 (30.7)	2.8 (37.0)	8.9 (48.0)	15.4 (59.7)	19.9 (67.8)	23.2 (73.8)	24.5 (76.1)	20.1 (68.2)	13.3 (55.9)	6.8 (44.2)	1.5 (34.7)	11.2 (52.2)
Mean daily minimum °C (°F)	−5.2 (22.6)	−5.0 (23.0)	−1.8 (28.8)	2.8 (37.0)	9.1 (48.4)	15.0 (59.0)	19.4 (66.9)	20.3 (68.5)	15.6 (60.1)	8.2 (46.8)	2.5 (36.5)	−1.8 (28.8)	6.6 (43.9)
Record low °C (°F)	−17.3 (0.9)	−15.1 (4.8)	−11.1 (12.0)	−4.1 (24.6)	−0.1 (31.8)	6.4 (43.5)	11.7 (53.1)	12.7 (54.9)	4.7 (40.5)	−0.6 (30.9)	−5.2 (22.6)	−12.0 (10.4)	−17.3 (0.9)
Average precipitation mm (inches)	123.6 (4.87)	77.5 (3.05)	70.8 (2.79)	65.2 (2.57)	65.8 (2.59)	91.4 (3.60)	169.3 (6.67)	124.8 (4.91)	106.6 (4.20)	103.8 (4.09)	100.7 (3.96)	144.6 (5.69)	1,250.1 (49.22)
Average precipitation days (≥ 1.0 mm)	20.1	14.9	12.9	10.4	9.0	9.0	13.1	10.2	9.8	11.5	14.1	19.4	154.3
Mean monthly sunshine hours	57.2	77.7	133.6	172.6	201.7	186.7	143.6	183.5	146.0	127.1	98.1	59.3	1,591
Source: Japan Meteorological Agency (2002–2020 normals, extremes 2002–present)

== Demographics ==
Per Japanese census data, the population of Murayama has declined steadily over the past 70 years and is now less than it was a century ago.

Historical population
Year	Pop.	±%
1920	30,731	—
1930	34,761	+13.1%
1940	35,751	+2.8%
1950	41,950	+17.3%
1960	38,959	−7.1%
1970	34,130	−12.4%
1980	32,324	−5.3%
1990	31,589	−2.3%
2000	29,586	−6.3%
2010	26,811	−9.4%
2020	22,516	−16.0%

== History ==
The area of present-day Murayama was part of ancient Dewa Province. After the start of the Meiji period, the area became part of Kitamurayama District, Yamagata Prefecture. The town of Tateoka was established with the establishment of the modern municipalities system on April 1, 1889. The city of Murayama was established on April 1, 1954 with the merger of Tateoka with the villages of Nishigo, Okura, Tozawa, Okubo and Fumoto.

Murayama became the registered host town for the Bulgarian rhythmic gymnastics team for the Tokyo 2020 Olympic Games. In 2019, during Japan's national "Host Town Summit 2019", Murayama received first-place awards in each of the three award categories: "Best Host Town Leader," "Best Communicator," and "Poster Session". Bulgaria went on to win the gold medal in the group all-around competition.

== Government ==
Murayama has a mayor-council form of government with a directly elected mayor and a unicameral city legislature of 16 members. The city contributes one member to the Yamagata Prefectural Assembly. In terms of national politics, the city is part of Yamagata District 2 of the lower house of the Diet of Japan.

== Economy ==
The economy of Murayama is based on agriculture.

== Education ==
Murayama has eight public elementary schools and two public middle schools operated by the city government and two public high schools operated by the Yamagata Prefectural Board of Education

== Transportation ==
=== Railway ===
East Japan Railway Company - Yamagata Shinkansen

- Murayama

East Japan Railway Company - Ōu Main Line

- Murayama - Sodesaki

=== Highway ===
- Tōhoku-Chūō Expressway – Murayama Interchange
- National Route 13
- National Route 347

== Sister cities ==
- Yakutsk, Russia, since April 21, 1992

Murayama also has friendly relations with Barrie, Canada.

== Noted people from Murayama ==
- Toshizo Matsuoka, longtime House of Representatives member from Yamagata
- Tokunai Mogami, Edo period samurai and explorer
- Tōru Murakawa, movie director
