= Funagata Station =

Railway station in Funagata, Yamagata Prefecture, Japan

Funagata Station 舟形駅
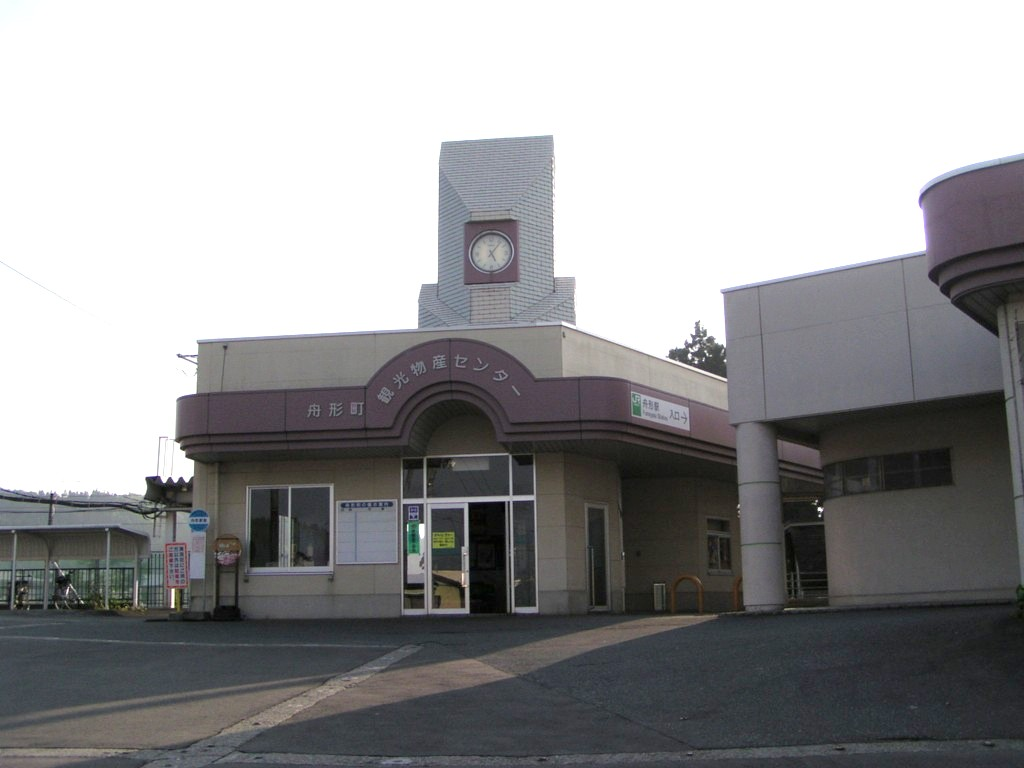
- Funagata Station, May 2005

General information
- Location: 391-2, Funagata, Funagata-machi, Mogami-gun, Yamagata-ken 999-4601; Japan
- Coordinates: 38°41′30″N 140°18′58″E
- Operator: JR East
- Line: ■ Yamagata Line
- Distance: 140.3 kilometers from Kogota
- Platforms: 2 side platforms

Other information
- Status: Staffed
- Website: Official website

History
- Opened: July 21, 1902

Passengers
- FY2018: 86

Services
Preceding station	JR East	Following station
Ashisawa towards Fukushima	Yamagata Line	Shinjō Terminus
Location
- Location within Yamagata Prefecture Location within Japan

Funagata Station (舟形駅, Funagata-eki) is a railway station located in the town of Funagata, Yamagata Prefecture, Japan, operated by the East Japan Railway Company (JR East).

== Lines ==
Funagata Station is served by the Ōu Main Line, and is located 140.3 rail kilometers from the terminus of the line at Fukushima Station.

== Station layout ==
The station has two opposed side platforms connected by a footbridge. The station is staffed, and the station building also serves as the town's Tourism and Local Products Promotion Center.

=== Platforms ===
1	■ Ōu Main Line	for Murayama and Yamagata
2	■ Ōu Main Line	for Shinjō

== History ==
Funagata Station opened on July 21, 1902. The station was absorbed into the JR East network upon the privatization of JNR on April 1, 1987. A new station building was completed in March 1993.

== Passenger statistics ==
In fiscal 2018, the station was used by an average of 86 passengers daily (boarding passengers only).

== Surrounding area ==
- Funagata Town Hall
- National Route 13
- Funagata Post Office

== See also ==
- List of railway stations in Japan
