= Kita-Ōishida Station =

Railway station in Ōshida, Yamagata Prefecture, Japan

Kita-Ōishida Station 北大石田駅
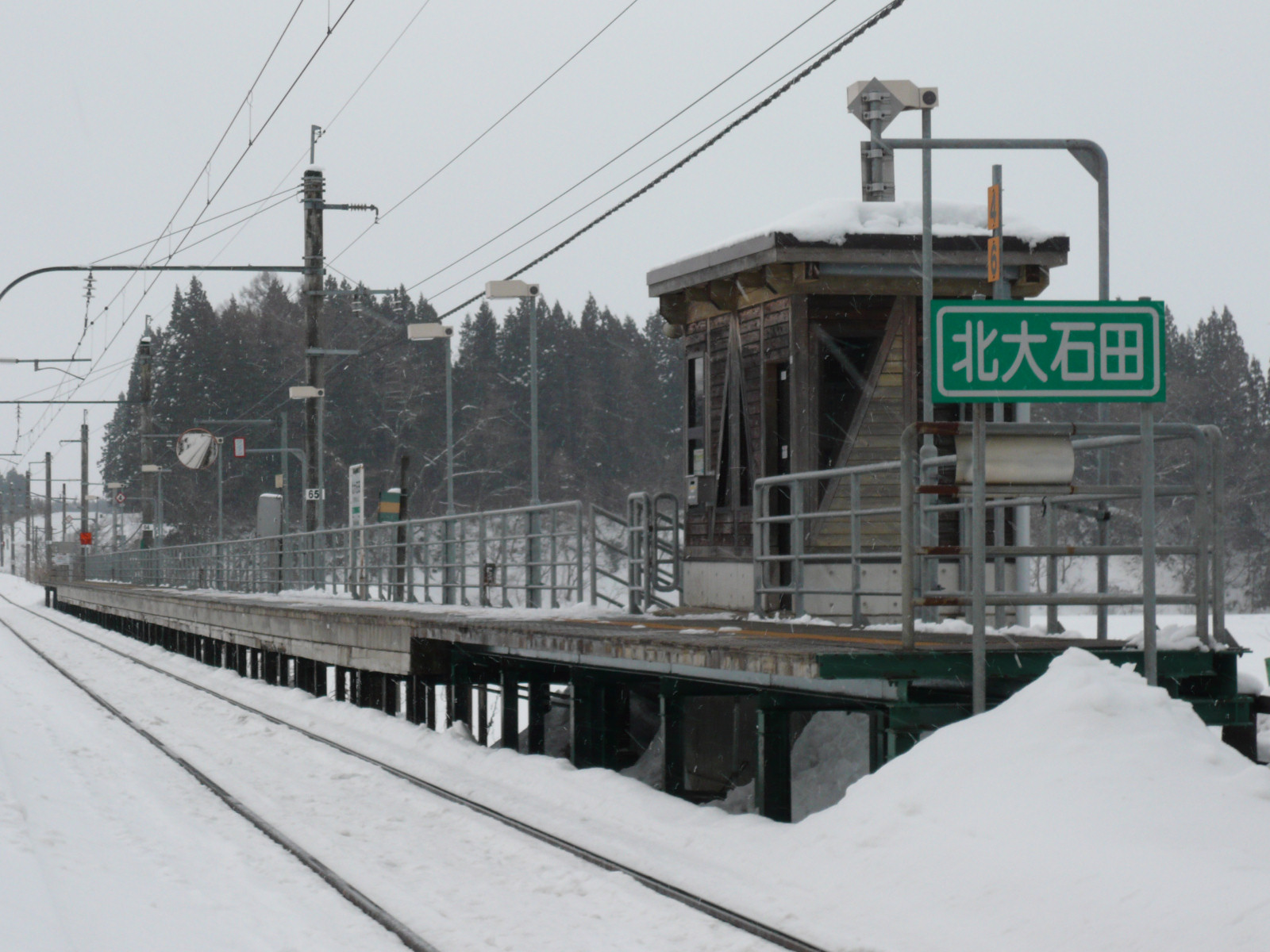
- Kita-Ōishida Station, February 2009

General information
- Location: Kamijuku Takanosu, Ōishida-machi, Kitamurayama-gun, Yamagata-ken 999-4101; Japan
- Coordinates: 38°37′47″N 140°22′16″E
- Operator: JR East
- Line: ■ Ōu Main Line
- Distance: 130.8 km from Fukushima
- Platforms: 1 side platform

Other information
- Status: Staffed
- Website: Official website

History
- Opened: December 20, 1960

Services
Preceding station	JR East	Following station
Ōishida towards Fukushima	Yamagata Line	Ashisawa towards Shinjō
Location
- Location within Yamagata Prefecture Location within Japan

Kita-Ōishida Station (北大石田駅, Kita-Ōishida-eki) is a railway station in the town of Ōishida, Yamagata, Japan, operated by East Japan Railway Company (JR East).

== Lines ==
Kita-Ōishida Station is served by the Ōu Main Line, and is located 130.8 rail kilometers from the terminus of the line at Fukushima Station.

== Station layout ==
The station has one side platform serving a single bi-directional track. The station is unattended.

== History ==
Kita-Ōishida Station opened on December 20, 1960. The station was absorbed into the JR East network upon the privatization of JNR on April 1, 1987. A portion of the platform measuring 15 x 3 meters collapsed during the 2011 Tōhoku earthquake.

== Surrounding area ==
- Ōishida Elementary School
- National Route 13

== See also ==
- List of railway stations in Japan
