= Ōishida Station =

Railway station in Ōshida, Yamagata Prefecture, Japan

Ōishida Station 大石田駅
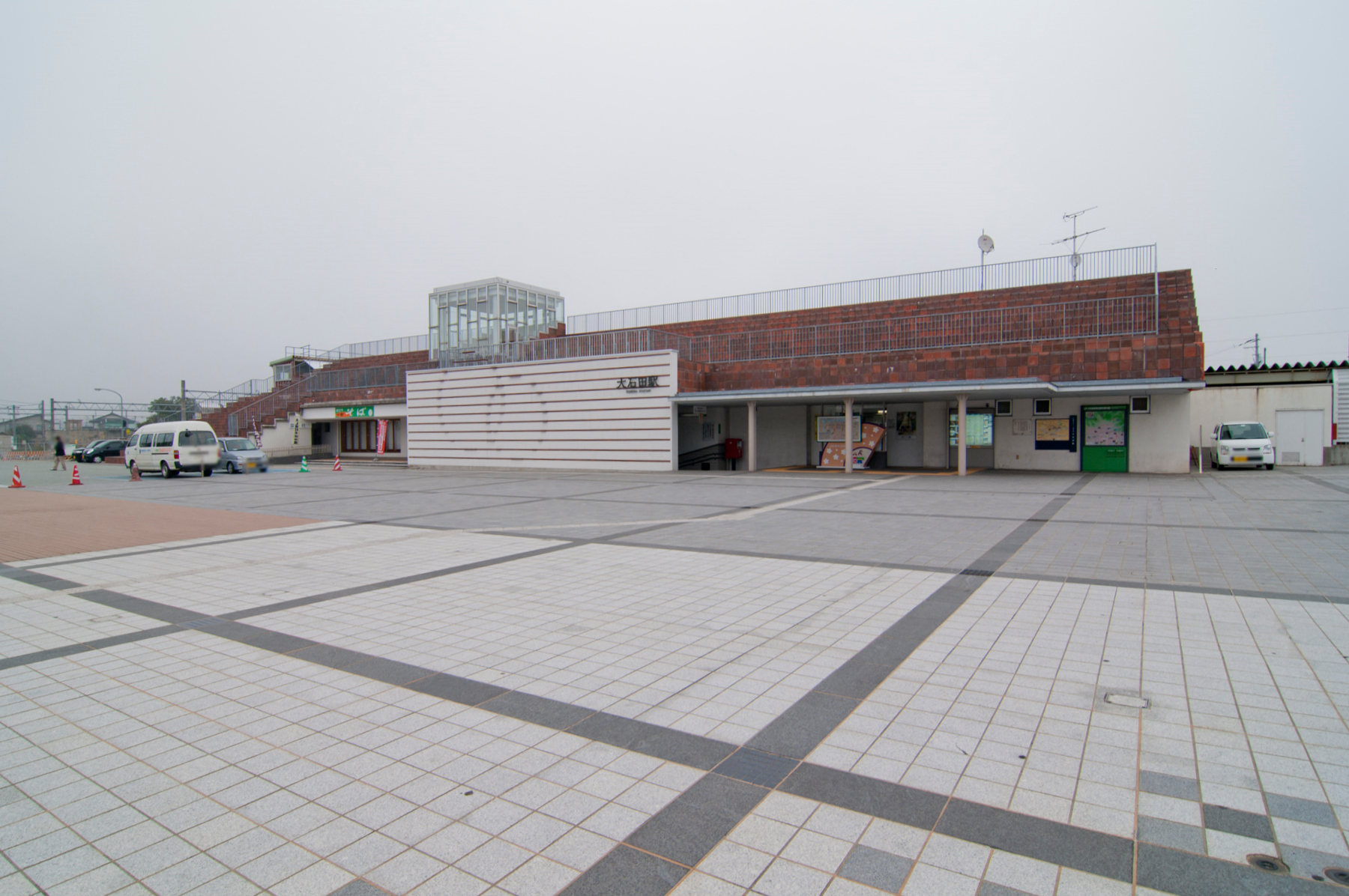
- The east entrance in October 2010

General information
- Location: 585 Ōishida-otsu, Ōishida, Kitamurayama District, Yamagata; Japan
- Coordinates: 38°35′44″N 140°22′31″E
- Operator: JR East
- Lines: Yamagata Shinkansen; Ōu Main Line
- Distance: 126.9 km (78.9 mi) from Fukushima
- Platforms: 2 side platforms
- Tracks: 2

Construction
- Structure type: At grade

Other information
- Status: Staffed (Midori no Madoguchi)
- Website: Official website

History
- Opened: 21 October 1901; 125 years ago

Passengers
- FY2018: 792

Services
Preceding station	JR East	Following station
Murayama towards Tokyo	Yamagata Shinkansen Tsubasa	Shinjō Terminus
Sodesaki towards Fukushima	Yamagata Line	Kita-Ōishida towards Shinjō
Location
- Location within Yamagata Prefecture Location within Japan

Ōishida Station (大石田駅, Ōishida-eki) is a junction railway station in the town of Ōishida, Yamagata, Japan, operated by East Japan Railway Company (JR East).

== Lines ==
Ōishida Station is served by the Ōu Main Line and the Yamagata Shinkansen, with direct high-speed Tsubasa services to and from Tokyo. It is located 126.9 rail kilometers from the terminus of both lines at Fukushima Station.

== Station layout ==
The station has two opposed side platforms connected to the station building by a footbridge. The station has a Midori no Madoguchi staffed ticket office.

=== Platforms ===
1	■ Yamagata Shinkansen	for Yamagata, Yonezawa, Fukushima, Ōmiya, and Tokyo for Shinjō
1	■ Yamagata Line	for Murayama, Tendō, and Yamagata for Shinjō
2	■ Yamagata Shinkansen	for Shinjō
2	■ Yamagata Line	for Murayama, Tendō, and Yamagata for Shinjō

== History ==
Ōishida Station opened on 21 October 1901. The privately owned Obanazawa Railroad connected to the station from 1926 until its abandonment in 1970. A new station building was completed in 1983. The station was absorbed into the JR East network upon the privatization of JNR on 1 April 1987. The Yamagata Shinkansen began operations on 4 December 1999.

== Passenger statistics ==
In fiscal 2018, the station was used by an average of 792 passengers daily (boarding passengers only).

== Surrounding area ==
- Ōishida Town Hall
- Ōishida Post Office
- Mogami River
- Ginzan Onsen
- National Route 347

== See also ==
- List of railway stations in Japan
