= Funagata, Yamagata =

Coordinates: 38°41′29.″N 140°19′12.2″E

Funagata 舟形町
- Town
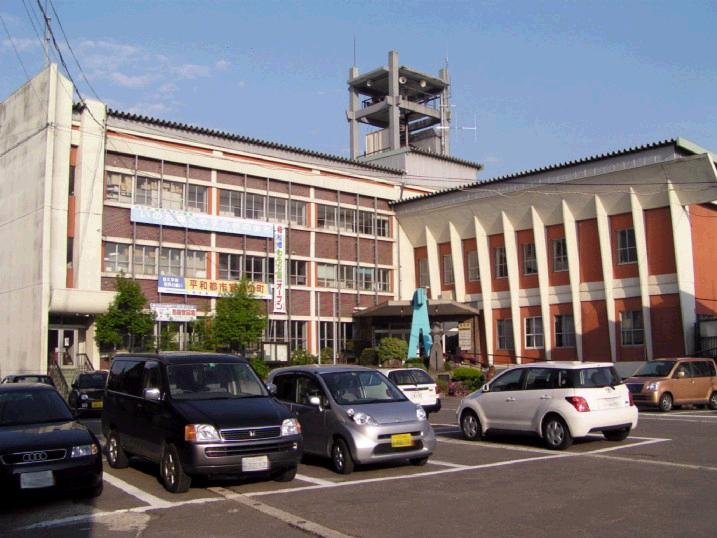
- Funagata Town Hall

- Flag Seal

- Location of Funagata in Yamagata Prefecture

- Coordinates: 38°41′29.″N 140°19′12.2″E
- Country: Japan
- Region: Tōhoku
- Prefecture: Yamagata
- District: Mogami

Area
  - Total: 119.03 km^{2} (45.96 sq mi)

Population (January 2020)
  - Total: 5,101
  - Density: 42.85/km^{2} (111.0/sq mi)
- Time zone: UTC+9 (Japan Standard Time)
- Tree: Japanese pagoda tree
- Flower: Kobushi Magnolia
- Phone number: 0233-32-2111
- Address: 263 Funagata, Funagata-machi, Mogami-gun, Yamagata-ken 999-4601
- Website: Official website

Funagata (舟形町, Funagata-machi) is a town located in Yamagata Prefecture, Japan. As of 1 January 2020, the town has an estimated population of 5,101, and a population density of 43 persons per km^{2}. The total area of the town is 119.03 square kilometres (46 sq mi).

== Geography ==
Funagata is located in mountainous north-central eastern Yamagata Prefecture. The Mogami River runs through the town. The area is known for extremely heavy snowfall in winter.

=== Neighboring municipalities ===
- Yamagata Prefecture
  - Mogami
  - Murayama
  - Obanazawa
  - Ōishida
  - Ōkura
  - Shinjō

=== Climate ===
Funagata has a humid continental climate (Köppen climate classification Cfa) with large seasonal temperature differences, with warm to hot (and often humid) summers and cold (sometimes severely cold) winters. Precipitation is significant throughout the year, but is heaviest from August to October. The average annual temperature in Funagata is 11.2 °C. The average annual rainfall is 1785 mm with September as the wettest month. The temperatures are highest on average in August, at around 24.9 °C, and lowest in January, at around -1.1 °C.

== History ==
The area of present-day Funagata was part of ancient Dewa Province and is mentioned in Nara period documents as a location of a fortified settlement on the road connecting Akita Castle on the Sea of Japan with Tagajo on the Pacific coast. During the Sengoku period, the area was under the control of the Mogami clan. During the Edo period, the Funagata was a river port on the Mogami River and a post station on the sankin kotai route to Edo and for pilgrims en route to the Three Mountains of Dewa. After the start of the Meiji period, the area became part of Mogami District, Yamagata Prefecture. The village of Funagata was established on April 1, 1889, with the establishment of the modern municipalities system. It was elevated to town status on December 1, 1954.

== Demographics ==
Per Japanese census data, the population of Funagata peaked around 1950 and has declined by more than half since then.

Historical population
Year	Pop.	±%
1920	7,730	—
1930	7,945	+2.8%
1940	8,512	+7.1%
1950	11,438	+34.4%
1960	10,957	−4.2%
1970	8,397	−23.4%
1980	8,028	−4.4%
1990	7,806	−2.8%
2000	6,996	−10.4%
2010	6,164	−11.9%
2020	5,007	−18.8%

== Education ==
Funagata has one public elementary and one public middle school operated by the town government. The town does not have a high school.

== Transportation ==
=== Railways ===
East Japan Railway Company - Ōu Main Line

- Funagata

East Japan Railway Company - Rikuu East Line

- Higashi-Nagasawa - Nagasawa

=== Highways ===
- Tōhoku-Chūō Expressway
- National Route 13
- National Route 47
