= Hayaguchi Station =

Railway station in Ōdate, Akita Prefecture, Japan

Hayaguchi Station 早口駅
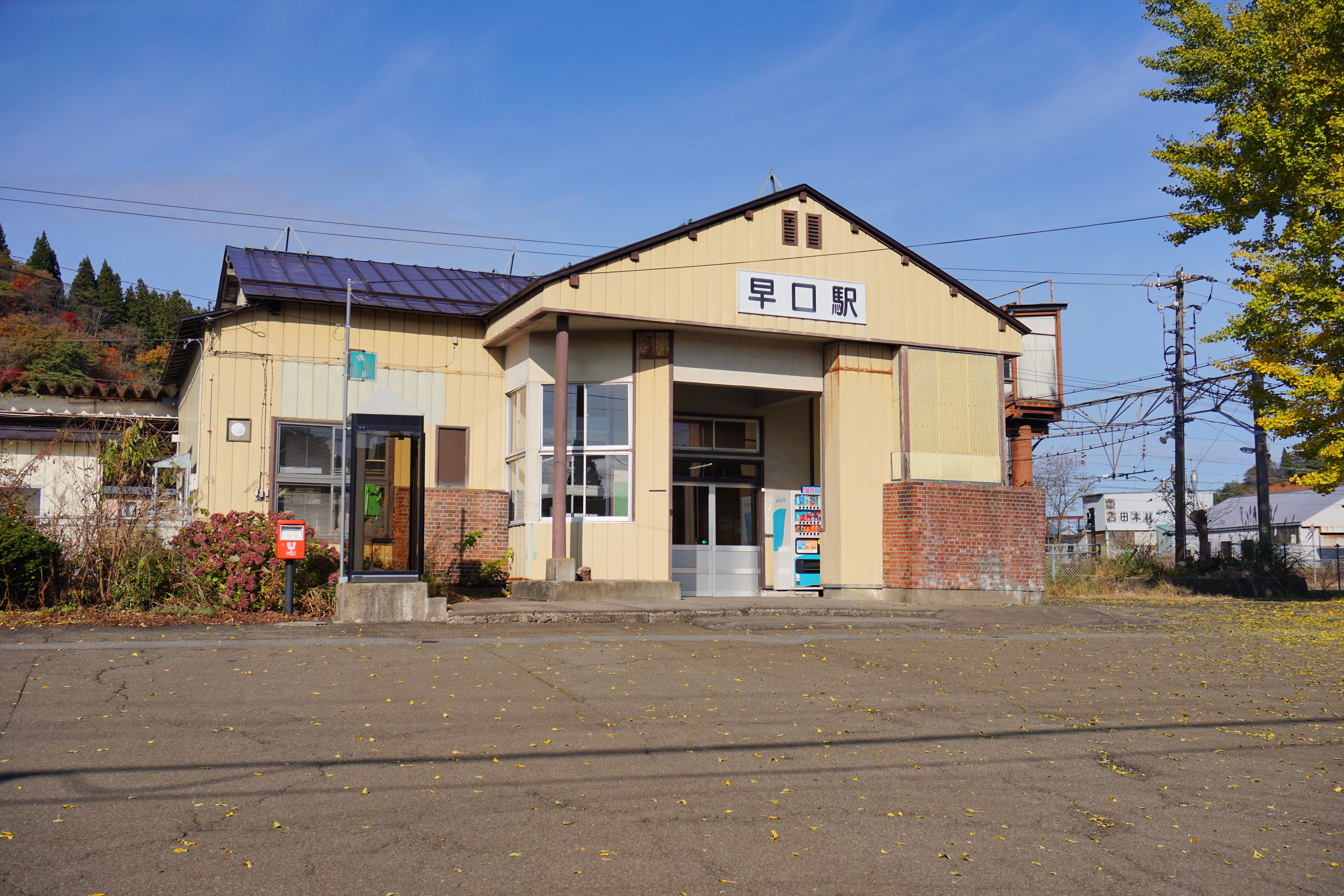
- Hayaguchi Station, November 2023

General information
- Location: 76-10 Yagorōsawa, Hayaguchi, Ōdate-shi, Akita-ken 018-3505; Japan
- Coordinates: 40°16′16.31″N 140°26′55.00″E
- Operator: JR East
- Line: ■ Ōu Main Line
- Distance: 393.5 kilometers from Fukushima
- Platforms: 1 side + 1 island platform

Other information
- Status: Staffed
- Website: Official website

History
- Opened: October 7, 1900

Passengers
- FY2018: 101

Services
Preceding station	JR East	Following station
Takanosu towards Akita	Ōu Main Line Rapid	Ōdate towards Aomori
Nukazawa towards Shinjō	Ōu Main Line Local	Shimokawazoi towards Aomori
Location
- Location within Akita Prefecture Location within Japan

Hayaguchi Station (早口駅, Hayaguchi-eki) is a railway station located in the city of Ōdate, Akita Prefecture, Japan, operated by the East Japan Railway Company (JR East).

== Lines ==
Hayaguchi Station is served by the Ōu Main Line, and is located 393.5 km from the terminus of the line at Fukushima.

== Station layout ==
The station consists of one island platform and one side platform serving three tracks, connected to the station building by a footbridge. However, Platform 3 is not in use. Hayaguchi Station is a simple consignment station, administered by Ōdate Station, and operated by Ōdate city authority, with point-of-sales terminal installed. Ordinary tickets, express tickets, and reserved-seat tickets for all JR lines are on sale (no connecting tickets).

=== Platforms ===
1	■ Ōu Main Line	for Higashi-Noshiro and Akita
2	■ Ōu Main Line	for Hirosaki and Aomori
3	■ Ōu Main Line	not normally in service

|}

== History ==
Hayaguchi Station was opened on October 7, 1900 a station on the Japanese Government Railways, serving the village of Hayaguchi, Akita. The JGR became the Japan National Railways (JNR) after World War II. The station was absorbed into the JR East network upon the privatization of the JNR on April 1, 1987.

== Passenger statistics ==
In fiscal 2018, the station was used by an average of 101 passengers daily (boarding passengers only).

== Surrounding area ==
- National Route 7
- Hayaguchi Post Office

== See also ==
- List of railway stations in Japan
