= Shimokawazoi Station =

Railway station in Ōdate, Akita Prefecture, Japan

Shimokawazoi Station 下川沿駅
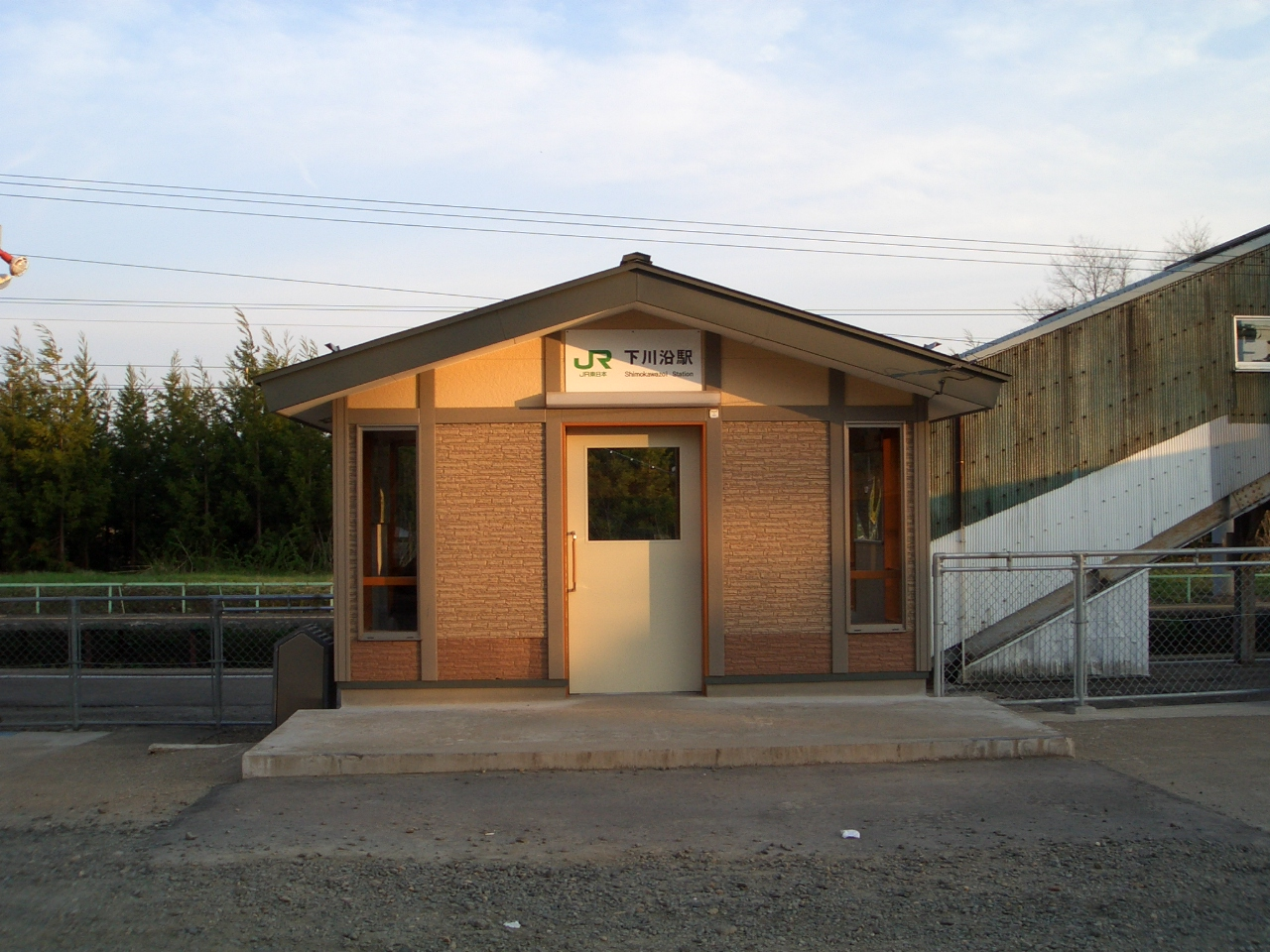
- Shimokawazoi Station (May 5, 2009)

General information
- Location: Hayatotai Kawaguchi, Ōdate-shi, Akita-ken 017-0878; Japan
- Coordinates: 40°16′35.73″N 140°29′51.61″E
- Operator: JR East
- Line: ■ Ōu Main Line
- Distance: 393.5 kilometers from Fukushima
- Platforms: 2 side platforms

Other information
- Status: Unstaffed
- Website: Official website

History
- Opened: May 1, 1951

Services
Preceding station	JR East	Following station
Hayaguchi towards Shinjō	Ōu Main Line Local	Ōdate towards Aomori
Location
- Location within Akita Prefecture Location within Japan

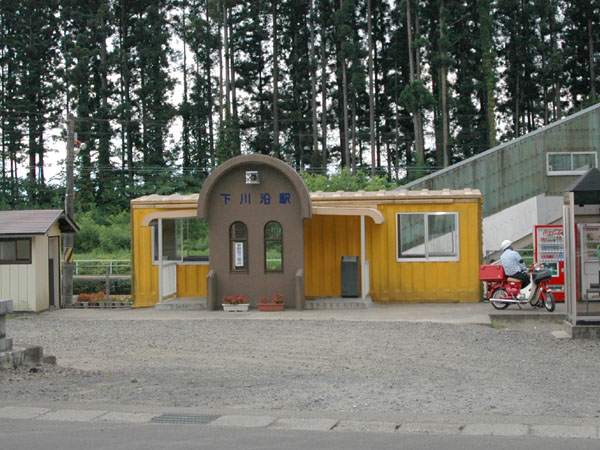
Former Shimokawazoi Station (Aug 3, 2004)

Shimokawazoi Station (下川沿駅, Shimokawazoi-eki) is a railway station located in the city of Ōdate, Akita Prefecture, Japan, operated by the East Japan Railway Company (JR East).

== Lines ==
Shimokawazoi Station is served by the Ōu Main Line, and is located 393.5 km from the terminus of the line at Fukushima.

== Station layout ==
The station consists of two opposed side platforms connected by a footbridge. The station is unattended.

=== Platforms ===
1	■ Ōu Main Line	for Hirosaki and Aomori
2	■ Ōu Main Line	for Higashi-Noshiro and Akita

== History ==
Shimokawazoi Station was opened on May 1, 1951 as a station on the Japan National Railways (JNR), serving the now-defunct village of Shimokawazoi, Akita. The station was absorbed into the JR East network upon the privatization of the JNR on April 1, 1987.

== Surrounding area ==
- National Route 7
- National Route 103

== See also ==
- List of railway stations in Japan
