= Naijōshi Station =

Railway station in Hirosaki, Aomori Prefecture, Japan

Naijōshi Station 撫牛子駅
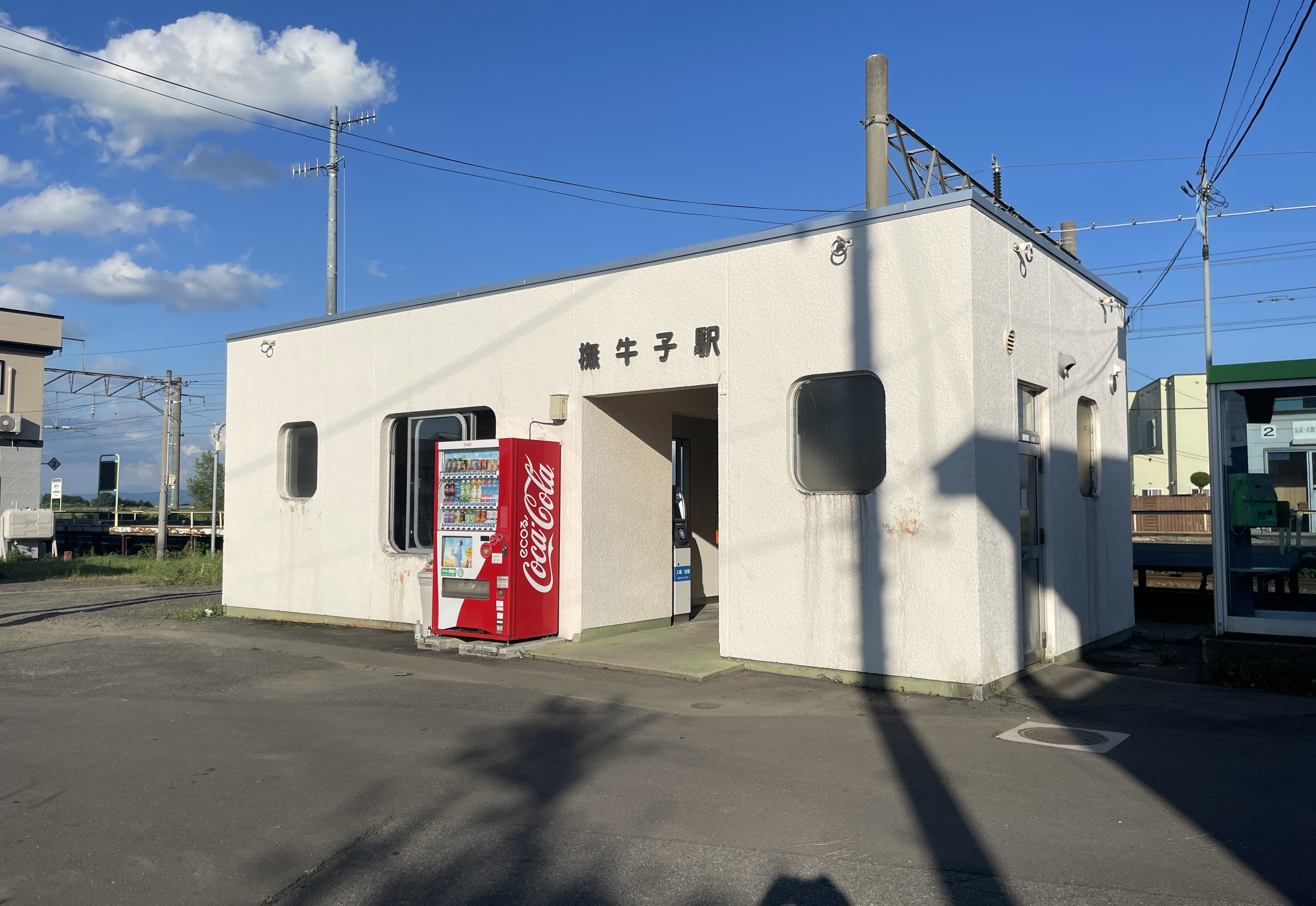
- Naijōshi Station in August 2023

General information
- Location: 1-23-13 Naijōshi, Hirosaki-shi, Aomori-ken 036-8075; Japan
- Coordinates: 40°37′18.69″N 140°29′52.7″E
- Operator: JR East
- Line: ■ Ōu Main Line
- Distance: 449.8 km from Fukushima
- Platforms: 2 side platforms

Other information
- Status: Unstaffed
- Website: Official website

History
- Opened: April 15, 1935

Services
Preceding station	JR East	Following station
Hirosaki towards Shinjō	Ōu Main Line Local	Kawabe towards Aomori
Hirosaki One-way operation	Gonō Line Rapid	Kawabe towards Higashi-Noshiro
Hirosaki Terminus	Gonō Line Local	Kawabe towards Higashi-Noshiro
Location
- Location within Aomori Prefecture Location within Japan

Naijōshi Station (撫牛子駅, Naijōshi-eki) is a railway station on the Ōu Main Line in the city of Hirosaki, Aomori Prefecture, Japan, operated by East Japan Railway Company (JR East).

== Lines ==
Naijōshi Station is served by the Ōu Main Line, and is 449.8 kilometers from the southern terminus of the line at Fukushima. Although the official terminus of the Gonō Line is at adjacent Kawabe Station, trains on the Gonō Line continue past Kawabe to terminate at Hirosaki for ease of connections.

== Station layout ==
Naijōshi Station has two ground level opposed side platforms, connected to the station building by a footbridge. The station is unattended.

=== Platforms ===
1	■ Ōu Main Line	for Aomori
	■ Gonō Line	for Goshogawara
2	■ Ōu Main Line	for Hirosaki and Higashi-Noshiro
	■ Gonō Line	for Hirosaki

== History ==
Naijōshi Station was opened on April 15, 1935, as a station on the Japanese Government Railways (JGR), which became Japanese National Railways (JNR) after World War II. The station has been unattended since October 1, 1971. With the privatization of JNR on April 1, 1987, the station came under the operational control of JR East.

== Surrounding area ==
- Sakaizuki Onsen

== See also ==
- List of railway stations in Japan
