= Ōishida =

Ōishida 大石田町
- Town
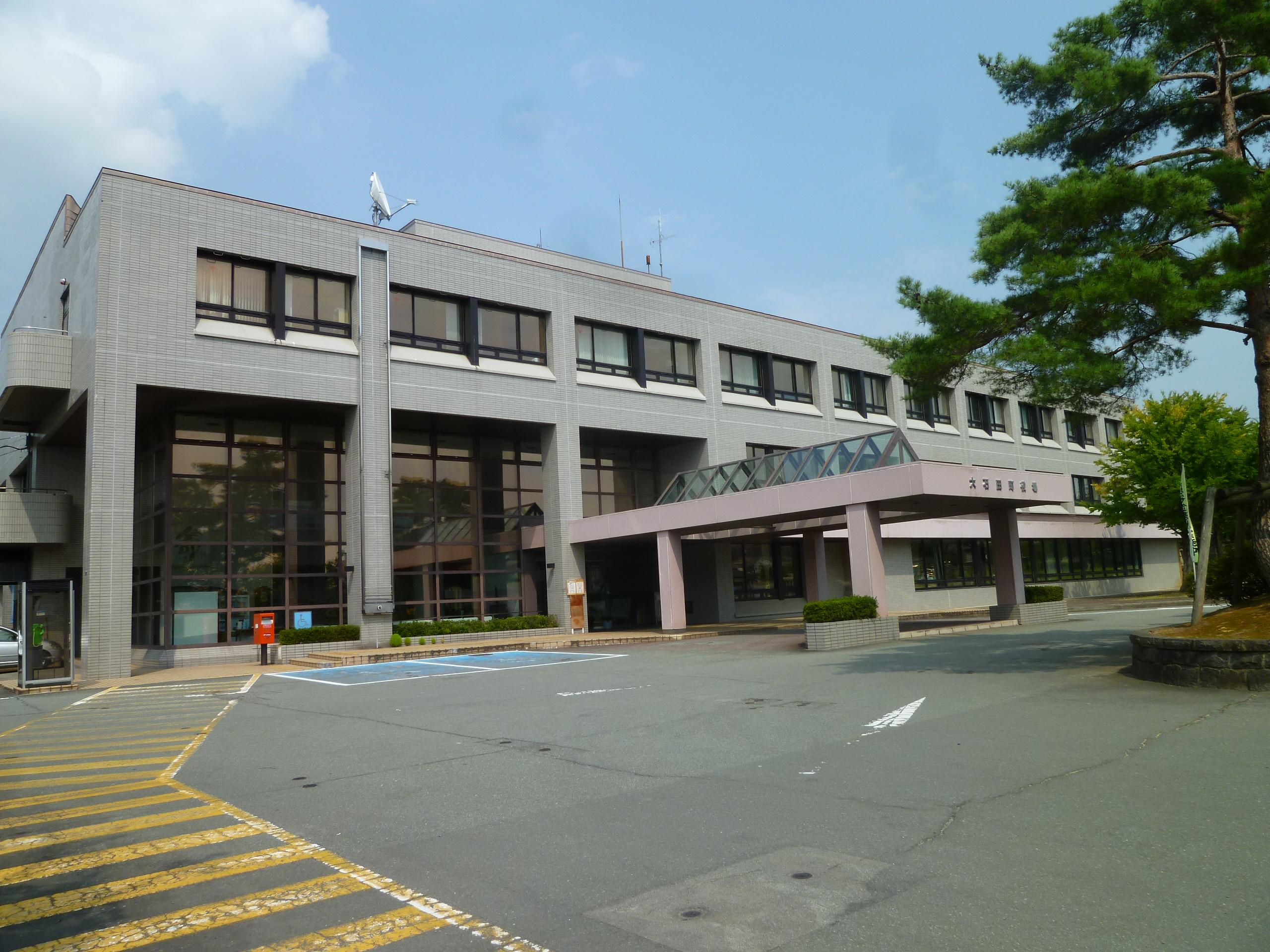

- Flag Seal

- Location of Ōishida in Yamagata Prefecture

- Coordinates: 38°35′37.8″N 140°22′21.6″E
- Country: Japan
- Region: Tōhoku
- Prefecture: Yamagata
- District: Kitamurayama

Area
  - Total: 79.54 km^{2} (30.71 sq mi)

Population (January 2020)
  - Total: 6,945
  - Density: 87.31/km^{2} (226.1/sq mi)
- Time zone: UTC+9 (Japan Standard Time)
- Tree: Katsura
- Flower: Cherry blossom
- Phone number: 0237-35-2111
- Address: 1 Midori-cho, Ōishida-machi, Kitatagawa-gun, Yamagata-ken 999-4112
- Website: Official website

Ōishida (大石田町, Ōishida-machi) is a town located in Yamagata Prefecture, Japan. As of 1 January 2020, the town had an estimated population of 6,945 in 2348 households, and a population density of 87 persons per km^{2}. The total area of the town is 79.54 square kilometres (31 sq mi).

== Geography ==
Ōishida is located in the mountains of north-east Yamagata Prefecture. The Mogami River flows through the town.

=== Neighboring municipalities ===
- Yamagata Prefecture
  - Funagata
  - Murayama
  - Obanazawa

=== Climate ===
Ōishida has a humid continental climate (Köppen climate classification Cfa) with large seasonal temperature differences, with warm to hot (and often humid) summers and cold (sometimes severely cold) winters. Precipitation is significant throughout the year, but is heaviest from August to October. The average annual temperature in Ōishida is 11.2 °C. The average annual rainfall is 1642 mm with September as the wettest month. The temperatures are highest on average in August, at around 24.9 °C, and lowest in January, at around -1.3 °C.

== Demographics ==
Per Japanese census data, the population of Ōishida peaked around the year 1950 has declined in the decades since. It is now considerably less than it was a century ago.

Historical population
| Year | Pop. | ±% |
|---|---|---|
| 1920 | 10,845 | — |
| 1930 | 12,073 | +11.3% |
| 1940 | 11,994 | −0.7% |
| 1950 | 16,018 | +33.6% |
| 1960 | 14,250 | −11.0% |
| 1970 | 11,799 | −17.2% |
| 1980 | 10,685 | −9.4% |
| 1990 | 10,292 | −3.7% |
| 2000 | 9,400 | −8.7% |
| 2010 | 8,160 | −13.2% |
| 2020 | 6,577 | −19.4% |

== History ==
The area of present-day Ōishida was part of ancient Dewa Province and is mentioned in the Engishiki records as the location of a fortified settlement on the highway connecting Akita Castle on the Sea of Japan with Tagajo on the Pacific coast. During the Edo period it was a river port on the Mogami River partly under the control of Shinjō Domain and partly tenryō territory administered directly by the Tokugawa shogunate. After the start of the Meiji period, the area became part of Kitamurayama District, Yamagata Prefecture. The village of Ōishida was established on April 1, 1889, with the creation of the modern municipalities system. It was raised to town status on January 23, 1897.

== Economy ==
The economy of Ōishida is based on agriculture.

== Education ==
Ōishida has one public elementary school and one public middle school operated by the town government. The town does not have a high school.

== Transportation ==
=== Railway ===
East Japan Railway Company - Yamagata Shinkansen

- Ōishida

East Japan Railway Company - Ōu Main Line

- Ōishida - Kita-Ōishida

=== Highway ===
- National Route 13
- National Route 347

== International relations ==
=== Sister cities ===
- Fangzheng County, China, since February 1, 1990
