= Sodesaki Station =

Railway station in Yamagata prefecture, Japan

Sodesaki Station 袖崎駅
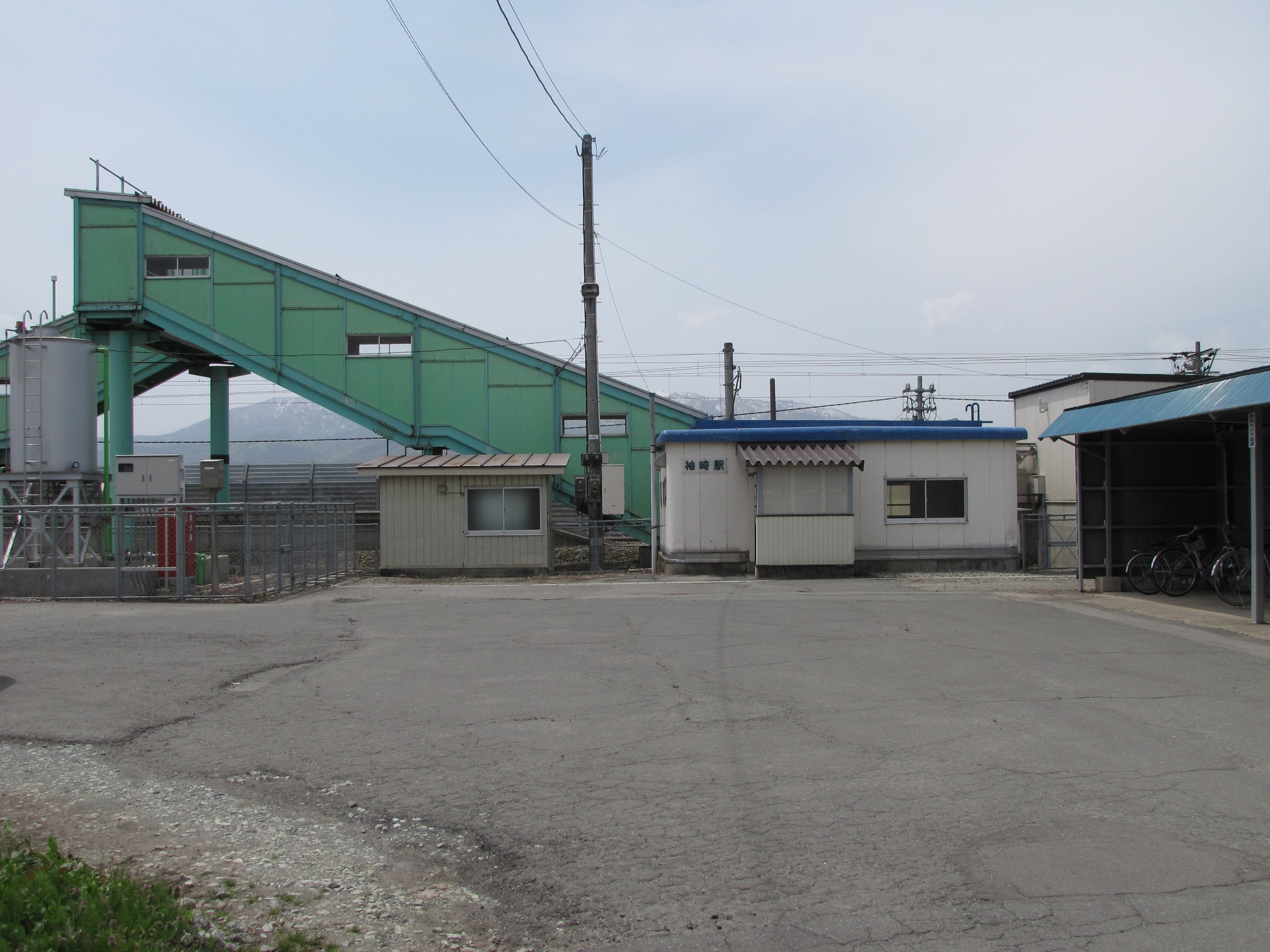
- Sodesaki Station

General information
- Location: Tochiuda, Murayama-shi, Yamagata-ken 995-0001; Japan
- Coordinates: 38°32′56″N 140°23′29″E
- Operator: JR East
- Line: ■ Ōu Main Line
- Distance: 121.5 km from Fukushima
- Platforms: 1 island platform

Other information
- Status: Unstaffed
- Website: Official website

History
- Opened: November 10, 1918

Services
Preceding station	JR East	Following station
Murayama towards Fukushima	Yamagata Line	Ōishida towards Shinjō
Location
- Location within Yamagata Prefecture Location within Japan

Sodesaki Station (袖崎駅, Sodesaki-eki) is a railway station located in the city of Murayama, Yamagata Prefecture, Japan, operated by the East Japan Railway Company (JR East).

== Lines ==
Sodesaki Station is served by the Ōu Main Line, and is located 121.5 rail kilometers from the terminus of the line at Fukushima Station.

== Station layout ==
The station has one island platform connected to the station building by a footbridge. The station is unattended.

=== Platforms ===
1	■ Ōu Main Line	for Yamagata, Murayama and Tendō
2	■ Ōu Main Line	for Shinjō

== History ==
Sodesaki Station opened as a signal stop on April 1, 1912. It became a full passenger station on November 10, 1918. The station was absorbed into the JR East network upon the privatization of the JNR on April 1, 1987.

== Surrounding area ==
- Sodesaki Post Office
- National Route 13

== See also ==
- List of railway stations in Japan
