= Kitamurayama District =

District in Yamagata prefecture, Japan

Coordinates: 38.6040°N 140.332°E

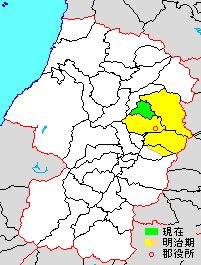
Map showing original extent of Kitamurayama District in Yamagata Prefecture yellow & green area=original extent in Meiji period; green=present area

Kitamurayama District (北村山郡, Kitamurayama-gun) is a rural district located in Yamagata Prefecture, Japan. As of October 2020, the district has an estimated population of 6,577 and an area of 79.54 km^{2}.

The cities of Murayama, Higashine and Ozanazawa and a portion of the city of Tendō were formerly part of Kitamurayama District.

== Towns and villages ==
- Ōishida

== History ==
Murayama County was an ancient place name in part of Dewa Province, occupying the area of modern Mogami, Nishimurayama, Higashimurayama and Kitamurayama districts. Under the Tokugawa shogunate, the area Kitamurayama district was a complicated mosaic. Two towns and 48 villages were tenryo ruled directly by the Tokugawa shogunate, 32 villages were part of Matsumae Domain in Ezo, 13 villages were part of Shinjō Domain, 7 villages were under Tsuchiura Domain, 4 villages were under Nagatoro Domain, 2 villages were part of Tendō Domain, 2 villages were part of Tatebayashi Domain and 1 village was part of Sakura Domain The area became part of Yamagata Prefecture in 1876. At that time, Kitamurayama District consisted of 2 towns and 105 villages.

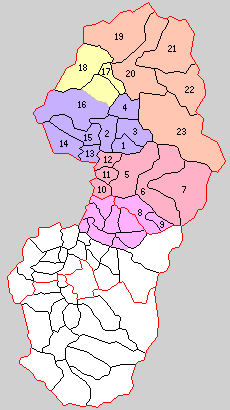
Historic Map of Kitamurayama District: 1. Tateoka; 2. Nishigō; 3. Ōkura; 4. Sodesaki; 5. Higashine; 6. Tōgō; 7. Miyazaki; 8. Yamaguchi; 9. Tamugino; 10. Ōtomi; 11. Odajima; 12. Nagatoro; 13. Ōkubo; 14. Fumoto; 15. Tozawa; 16. Ōtakane; 17. Ōishida; 18. Kameida; 19. Fukuhara; 20. Obanazawa; 21. Miyasawa; 22. Tamano; 23. Tokiwa; Purple=Murayama City Yellow= Ōishida Town Orange=Obanazawa City Red=Higashine City Pink=Tendō City

With the establishment of the municipality system on April 1, 1889, the district was consolidated into 23 villages.

- On March 18, 1892, Tateoka was raised to town status
- On June 15, 1896, Higashine was raised to town status
- On April 22, 1897, Ōishida was raised to town status
- On July 16, 1897, Obanazawa was raised to town status
- On November 1, 1954, the city of Murayama was founded by the merger of Tateoka with five neighboring villages.
- On November 3, 1958, Higashine was raised to city status
- On April 10, 1959, Obanazawa was raised to city status
