= Ōu Main Line =

Railway line in Japan

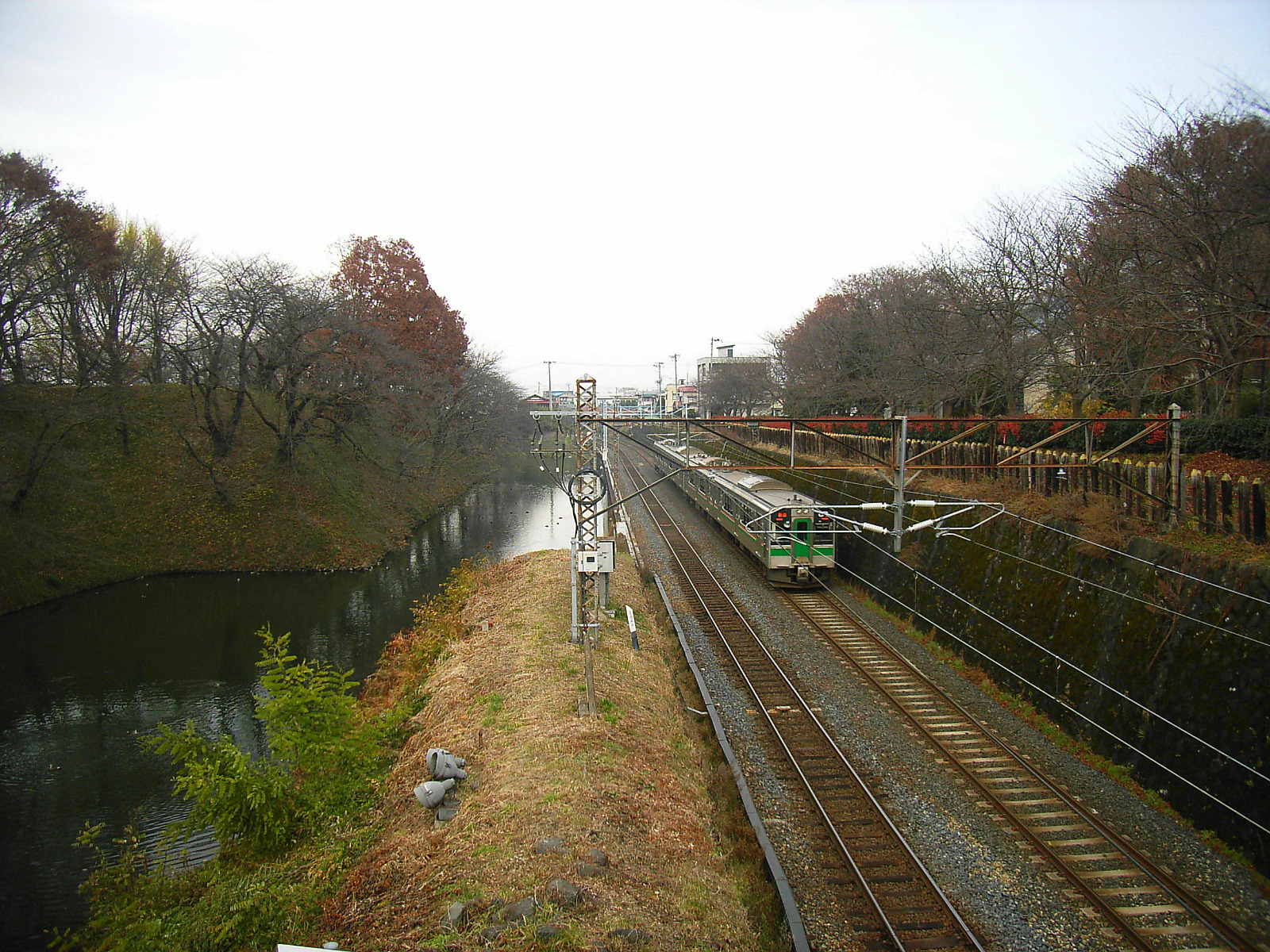
- Passing the moat of Yamagata Castle with narrow gauge tracks on the left and standard gauge on the right

Overview
- Native name: 奥羽本線
- Status: Operating
- Owner: JR East
- Termini: Fukushima; Aomori
- Stations: 102

Service
- Type: Main line
- System: JR East

History
- Opened: December 1, 1894; 131 years ago

Technical
- Track length: 486.3 km (302.2 mi)
- Num of tracks: 2
- Character: Elevated, rural
- Track gauge: 1,067 mm (3 ft 6 in); 1,435 mm (4 ft 8 1/2 in)
- Electrification: Overhead line, 20 kV 50 Hz AC (Fukushima–Shinjō and Innai–Aomori)
Route map
Standard gauge tracks are shown in red, narrow gauge is shown in blue.

The Ōu Main Line (Japanese: 奥羽本線, Hepburn: Ōu-honsen) is a railway line in Japan, operated by the East Japan Railway Company (JR East). It connects Fukushima Station through Akita Station to Aomori Station. Since the opening of the Yamagata Shinkansen on July 1, 1992, the Fukushima–Yamagata section (as well as the Yamagata–Shinjō section since 1999) is sometimes referred to as the Yamagata Line (山形線, Yamagata-sen). The name of the line as a whole refers to the ancient provinces of Mutsu (陸奥) and Dewa (出羽), as it connects both ends of Mutsu by passing north–south through Dewa.

== Route data ==
- East Japan Railway Company
- Total distance: 486.3 km (302.2 mi) (Fukushima–Aomori, Tsuchizaki–Akitakō)
  - East Japan Railway Company
    - 484.5 km (301.1 mi) (Fukushima–Aomori)
  - Japan Freight Railway Company
    - 1.8 km (1.1 mi) (Tsuchizaki–Akitakō)
    - 256.2 km (159.2 mi) (Yokote–Aomori)
    - 4.8 km (3.0 mi) (Aomori–Aomori Stoplight Station)
- Track gauge:
  - 1,067 mm (3 ft 6 in)
    - Shinjō–Ōmagari
    - Akita–Aomori
  - 1,435 mm (4 ft 8 1/2 in)
    - Fukushima–Yamagata
    - Uzen-Chitose–Shinjō
  - Both (1,067 mm (3 ft 6 in), 1,435 mm (4 ft 8 1/2 in))
    - Yamagata–Uzen-Chitose
    - Ōmagari–Akita
- Stations: 102 (including freight stations)
- Tracks:
  - Dual-track
    - Fukushima–Sekine (1968–91)
    - Akayu–Akayu Stoplight Station (1968)
    - Uzen-Nakayama–Uzen-Chitose (1968–86)
    - Ashisawa–Funagata (1975)
    - Nozoki–Innai (1968)
    - Ōmagari–Oiwake (1963–94)
    - Ugo-Iizuka–Hachirōgata (1969)
    - Kado–Moritake (1967)
    - Tsurugata–Maeyama (1969–71)
    - Takanosu–Hayaguchi (1969)
    - Ōdate–Nagamine (1968–71)
    - Ishikawa–Kawabe (1967–70)
  - Single-track
    - Sekine–Akayu
    - Akayu Stoplight Station–Uzen-Nakayama
    - Uzen-Chitose–Ashisawa
    - Funagata–Nozoki
    - Innai– Ōmagari
    - Oiwake–Ugo-Iizuka
    - Hachirōgata–Kado
    - Moritake–Tsurugata
    - Maeyama–Takanosu
    - Hayaguchi–Ōdate
    - Nagamine–Ishikawa
    - Kawabe–Aomori
- Electrification:
  - 20,000 V 50 Hz alternating current
    - Fukushima–Shinjō
    - Innai–Aomori
  - De-electrified
    - Shinjō–Innai
- Block system: Automatic block system (except Tsuchizaki–Akitakō section (gearing block system))
- Depots: Yamagata, Akita

== Services ==
The Ōu Main Line is split into the following four sections. Due to the differences in the tracks of these sections, there are no trains that go through more than one (with the exception of an Akita–Shinjō connection). Local and rapid services on the line are generally operated by 701 series (entire line) and 719 series (Fukushima–Shinjō only) electric multiple unit trains.

=== Fukushima–Shinjō ===
On this section, which extends for 148.6 kilometres (92.3 mi), the Ōu Main Line shares tracks with the Yamagata Shinkansen, a so-called mini-Shinkansen line. Mini-Shinkansen projects convert existing narrow-gauge main lines to standard gauge so that Shinkansen-specification trains can operate directly onto conventional routes.

The tracks were re-gauged between 1988 and 1992, with services commencing on 1 July 1992 under the Tsubasa service name. The rail gauge is 1,435 mm (4 ft 8 1/2 in) standard gauge to allow Yamagata Shinkansen trains to operate. The Ōu Main Line is known as the Yamagata Line on this section.

=== Shinjō–Ōmagari ===
This section is 98.4 kilometres (61.1 mi) long, crossing the border between Yamagata and Akita. Demand is relatively low, and all trains except one limited-stop "Rapidservice operate as all-stations "Localtrains.

=== Ōmagari–Akita ===
Covering 51.7 kilometres (32.1 mi), this section is shared with the Akita Shinkansen, which is also a mini-Shinkansen line converted from narrow gauge to standard gauge. Services began on 22 March 1997 under the Komachi service name. The conversion involved the installation of a parallel single standard-gauge track. On a 13-kilometre (8.1 mi) section between Jingūji and Mineyoshikawa, a third running rail was added to the narrow-gauge, allowing mini-Shinkansen trains to operate over either track. The arrangement allows narrow-gauge Ōu Main Line services to continue to operate between Shinjō and Akita.

=== Akita–Aomori ===
The northernmost section runs for 185.8 kilometres (115.5 mi) between Akita and Aomori. Together with the San'in Main Line, Maizuru Line, Obama Line, Hokuriku Main Line (including the IR Ishikawa Railway, Ainokaze Toyama Railway, and the Nihonkai Hisui Line), part of the Shinetsu Main Line (including the Myoko Haneuma Line), Hakushin Line, and the Uetsu Main Line, it forms part of the Nihonkai Jūkan-sen (Sea of Japan Trans-Japan Line), used by both express and freight services.

== Station list ==
Legend:

●	All trains stop
↓	Trains stop when travelling in the indicated direction
|	All trains pass

Station	Distance in km (mi)	Rapid	Gauge	Transfers	Location	
Fukushima	0 (0)		Standard	Tōhoku Shinkansen; Yamagata Shinkansen; ■ Tōhoku Main Line; ■ Abukuma Express Line; ■ Iizaka Line	Fukushima	Fukushima; Prefecture
Sasakino	3.8 (2.4)		Standard		Fukushima	Fukushima; Prefecture
Niwasaka	6.9 (4.3)		Standard		Fukushima	Fukushima; Prefecture
Itaya	21.2 (13.2)		Standard		Yonezawa	Yamagata; Prefecture
Tōge	24.5 (15.2)		Standard		Yonezawa	Yamagata; Prefecture
Ōsawa	28.8 (17.9)		Standard		Yonezawa	Yamagata; Prefecture
Sekine	34.8 (21.6)		Standard		Yonezawa	Yamagata; Prefecture
Yonezawa	40.1 (24.9)		Standard	Yamagata Shinkansen; ■ Yonesaka Line	Yonezawa	Yamagata; Prefecture
Oitama	45.6 (28.3)		Standard		Yonezawa	Yamagata; Prefecture
Takahata	49.9 (31.0)		Standard	Yamagata Shinkansen	Takahata	Yamagata; Prefecture
Akayu	56.1 (34.9)		Standard	Yamagata Shinkansen; ■ Flower Nagai Line	Nanyō	Yamagata; Prefecture
Nakagawa	64.4 (40.0)		Standard		Nanyō	Yamagata; Prefecture
Uzen-Nakayama	68.3 (42.4)		Standard		Kaminoyama	Yamagata; Prefecture
Kaminoyama Onsen	75.0 (46.6)		Standard	Yamagata Shinkansen	Kaminoyama	Yamagata; Prefecture
Mokichi Kinenkan-mae	77.8 (48.3)		Standard		Kaminoyama	Yamagata; Prefecture
Zaō	81.8 (50.8)		Standard		Yamagata	Yamagata; Prefecture
Yamagata	87.1 (54.1)		Dual	Yamagata Shinkansen; ■ Senzan Line; ■ Aterazawa Line	Yamagata	Yamagata; Prefecture
Kita-Yamagata	89.0 (55.3)		Dual	■ Senzan Line; ■ Aterazawa Line	Yamagata	Yamagata; Prefecture
Uzen-Chitose	91.9 (57.1)		Dual	■ Senzan Line	Yamagata	Yamagata; Prefecture
Minami-Dewa	93.6 (58.2)		Standard		Yamagata	Yamagata; Prefecture
Urushiyama	94.9 (59.0)		Standard		Yamagata	Yamagata; Prefecture
Takatama	97.0 (60.3)		Standard		Tendō	Yamagata; Prefecture
Tendō-Minami	98.3 (61.1)		Standard		Tendō	Yamagata; Prefecture
Tendō	100.4 (62.4)		Standard	Yamagata Shinkansen	Tendō	Yamagata; Prefecture
Midaregawa	103.4 (64.2)		Standard		Tendō	Yamagata; Prefecture
Jimmachi	106.3 (66.1)		Standard		Higashine	Yamagata; Prefecture
Sakuranbo Higashine	108.1 (67.2)		Standard	Yamagata Shinkansen	Higashine	Yamagata; Prefecture
Higashine	110.6 (68.7)		Standard		Higashine	Yamagata; Prefecture
Murayama	113.5 (70.5)		Standard	Yamagata Shinkansen	Murayama	Yamagata; Prefecture
Sodesaki	121.5 (75.5)		Standard		Murayama	Yamagata; Prefecture
Ōishida	126.9 (78.9)		Standard	Yamagata Shinkansen	Ōishida	Yamagata; Prefecture
Kita-Ōishida	130.8 (81.3)		Standard		Ōishida	Yamagata; Prefecture
Ashisawa	133.7 (83.1)		Standard		Obanazawa	Yamagata; Prefecture
Funagata	140.3 (87.2)		Standard		Funagata	Yamagata; Prefecture
Shinjō	148.6 (92.3)		Standard	Yamagata Shinkansen; ■ Rikuu East Line; ■ Rikuu West Line	Shinjō	Yamagata; Prefecture
Izumita	154.2 (95.8)		Narrow		Shinjō	Yamagata; Prefecture
Uzen-Toyosato	161.3 (100.2)		Narrow		Sakegawa	Yamagata; Prefecture
Mamurogawa	164.0 (101.9)		Narrow		Mamurogawa	Yamagata; Prefecture
Kamabuchi	173.2 (107.6)		Narrow		Mamurogawa	Yamagata; Prefecture
Ōtaki	180.3 (112.0)		Narrow		Mamurogawa	Yamagata; Prefecture
Nozoki	185.8 (115.5)		Narrow		Mamurogawa	Yamagata; Prefecture
Innai	194.4 (120.8)		Narrow		Yuzawa	Akita; Prefecture
Yokobori	198.4 (123.3)		Narrow		Yuzawa	Akita; Prefecture
Mitsuseki	204.4 (127.0)		Narrow		Yuzawa	Akita; Prefecture
Kami-Yuzawa	207.1 (128.7)		Narrow		Yuzawa	Akita; Prefecture
Yuzawa	210.4 (130.7)	●	Narrow		Yuzawa	Akita; Prefecture
Shimo-Yuzawa	214.5 (133.3)	↓	Narrow		Yuzawa	Akita; Prefecture
Jūmonji	217.8 (135.3)	●	Narrow		Yokote	Akita; Prefecture
Daigo	221.2 (137.4)	↓	Narrow		Yokote	Akita; Prefecture
Yanagita	224.4 (139.4)	↓	Narrow		Yokote	Akita; Prefecture
Yokote	228.3 (141.9)	●	Narrow	■ Kitakami Line	Yokote	Akita; Prefecture
Gosannen	234.7 (145.8)	↓	Narrow		Misato	Akita; Prefecture
Iizume	239.8 (149.0)	●	Narrow		Misato	Akita; Prefecture
Ōmagari	247.0 (153.5)	●	Dual	Akita Shinkansen; ■ Tazawako Line	Daisen	Akita; Prefecture
Jingūji	253.0 (157.2)	↓	Dual		Daisen	Akita; Prefecture
Kariwano	260.6 (161.9)	●	Dual		Daisen	Akita; Prefecture
Mineyoshikawa	265.4 (164.9)	↓	Dual		Daisen	Akita; Prefecture
Ugo-Sakai	271.9 (169.0)	↓	Dual		Daisen	Akita; Prefecture
Ōbarino	280.0 (174.0)	↓	Dual		Akita	Akita; Prefecture
Wada	285.4 (177.3)	●	Dual		Akita	Akita; Prefecture
Yotsugoya	292.3 (181.6)	●	Dual		Akita	Akita; Prefecture
Akita	298.7 (185.6)	●	Dual	Akita Shinkansen; ■ Uetsu Main Line; ■ Oga Line	Akita	Akita; Prefecture
Izumi-Sotoasahikawa	301.8 (187.5)	● (Note: Rapid Resort Shirakami doesn't stop at the station)	Narrow		Akita	Akita; Prefecture
Tsuchizaki	305.8 (190.0)	●	Narrow		Akita	Akita; Prefecture
Kami-Iijima	308.3 (191.6)	●	Narrow		Akita	Akita; Prefecture
Oiwake	311.7 (193.7)	●	Narrow	■ Oga Line	Akita	Akita; Prefecture
Ōkubo	318.9 (198.2)	●	Narrow		Katagami	Akita; Prefecture
Ugo-Īizuka	322.2 (200.2)	●	Narrow		Katagami	Akita; Prefecture
Ikawa-Sakura	323.6 (201.1)	●	Narrow		Ikawa	Akita; Prefecture
Hachirōgata	327.5 (203.5)	●	Narrow		Hachirōgata	Akita; Prefecture
Koikawa	333.0 (206.9)	｜	Narrow		Mitane	Akita; Prefecture
Kado	338.4 (210.3)	｜	Narrow		Mitane	Akita; Prefecture
Moritake	345.1 (214.4)	●	Narrow		Mitane	Akita; Prefecture
Kita-Kanaoka	349.4 (217.1)	｜	Narrow		Mitane	Akita; Prefecture
Higashi-Noshiro	355.4 (220.8)	●	Narrow	■ Gonō Line	Noshiro	Akita; Prefecture
Tsurugata	360.3 (223.9)	｜	Narrow		Noshiro	Akita; Prefecture
Tomine	365.5 (227.1)	｜	Narrow		Noshiro	Akita; Prefecture
Futatsui	372.2 (231.3)	●	Narrow		Noshiro	Akita; Prefecture
Maeyama	379.5 (235.8)	｜	Narrow		Kita-Akita	Akita; Prefecture
Takanosu	384.9 (239.2)	●	Narrow	■ Akita Nairiku Line	Kita-Akita	Akita; Prefecture
Nukazawa	388.1 (241.2)	｜	Narrow		Kita-Akita	Akita; Prefecture
Hayaguchi	393.5 (244.5)	●	Narrow		Ōdate	Akita; Prefecture
Shimokawazoi	397.7 (247.1)	｜	Narrow		Ōdate	Akita; Prefecture
Ōdate	402.9 (250.4)	●	Narrow	■ Hanawa Line	Ōdate	Akita; Prefecture
Shirasawa	409.4 (254.4)	｜	Narrow		Ōdate	Akita; Prefecture
Jimba	416.5 (258.8)	｜	Narrow		Ōdate	Akita; Prefecture
Tsugaru-Yunosawa	422.3 (262.4)	｜	Narrow		Hirakawa	Aomori Prefecture
Ikarigaseki	427.2 (265.4)	●	Narrow		Hirakawa	Aomori Prefecture
Nagamine	432.0 (268.4)	｜	Narrow		Ōwani	Aomori Prefecture
Ōwani-Onsen	435.3 (270.5)	●	Narrow	■ Kōnan Railway Ōwani Line	Ōwani	Aomori Prefecture
Ishikawa	440.7 (273.8)	｜	Narrow		Hirosaki	Aomori Prefecture
Hirosaki	447.1 (277.8)	●	Narrow	■ Kōnan Railway Kōnan Line	Hirosaki	Aomori Prefecture
Naijōshi	449.8 (279.5)	｜	Narrow		Hirosaki	Aomori Prefecture
Kawabe	453.4 (281.7)	●	Narrow	■ Gonō Line	Inakadate	Aomori Prefecture
Kita-Tokiwa	456.6 (283.7)	●	Narrow		Fujisaki	Aomori Prefecture
Namioka	462.1 (287.1)	●	Narrow		Aomori	Aomori Prefecture
Daishaka	467.2 (290.3)	｜	Narrow		Aomori	Aomori Prefecture
Tsurugasaka	473.4 (294.2)	｜	Narrow		Aomori	Aomori Prefecture
Tsugaru-Shinjō	478.8 (297.5)	●	Narrow		Aomori	Aomori Prefecture
Shin-Aomori	480.6 (298.6)	●	Narrow	Tōhoku Shinkansen; Hokkaido Shinkansen	Aomori	Aomori Prefecture
Aomori	484.5 (301.1)	●	Narrow	■ Tsugaru Line; Aoimori Railway Line	Aomori	Aomori Prefecture

== History ==
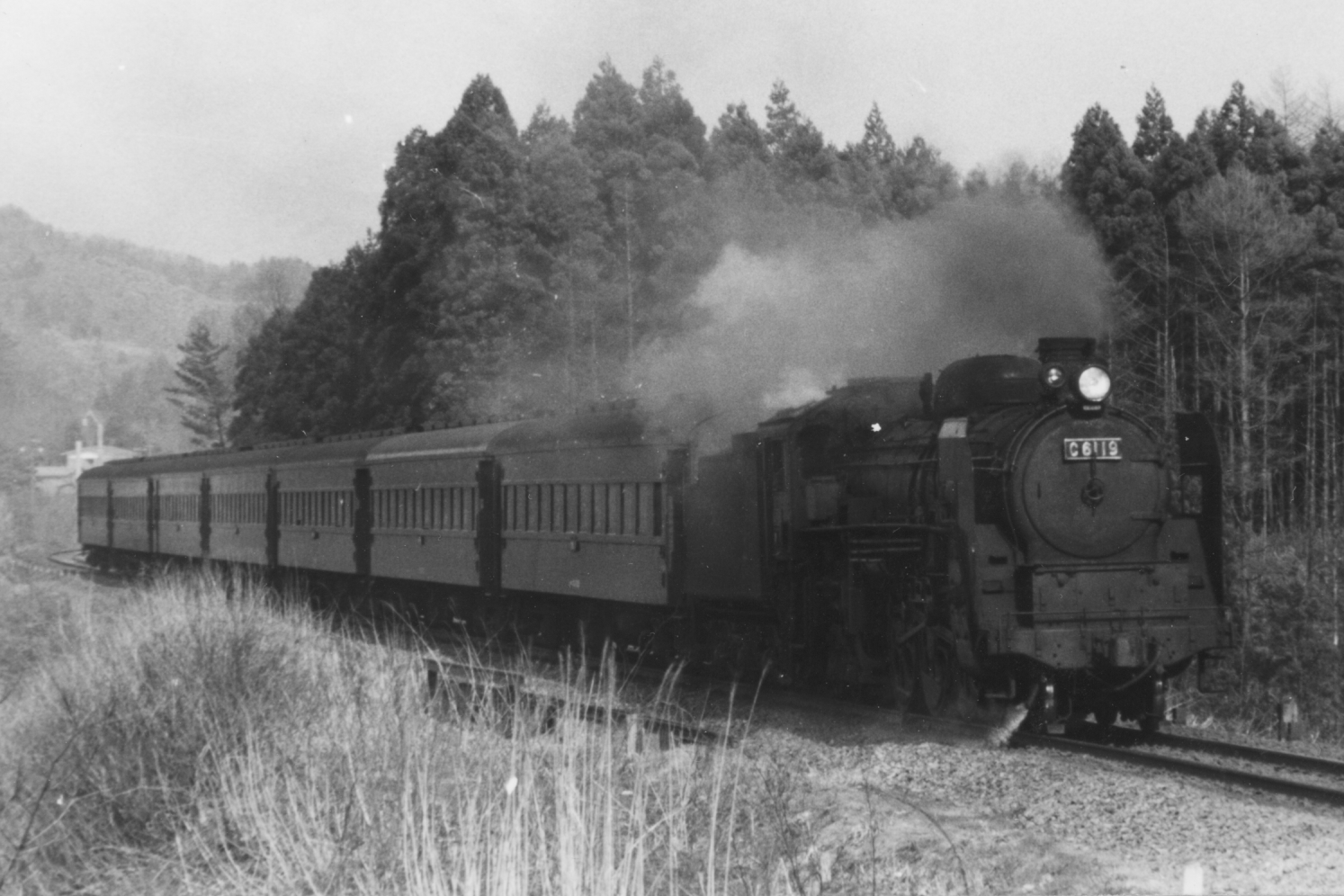
Steam-hauled service between Futatsui and Maeyama in 1971, hauled by a class C61

The Japanese national government built the Ōu Main Line, starting construction from Aomori in 1894, from Fukushima in 1899 and linking the two sections in 1905. In 1909 the formal name of the line was declared.

Opening dates for the individual sections are as follows.

=== Ōu North Line ===
- December 1, 1894: Aomori–Hirosaki
- October 21, 1895: Hirosaki–Ikarigaseki
- June 21, 1899: Ikarigaseki–Shirasawa
- November 15, 1899: Shirasawa–Ōdate
- October 7, 1900: Ōdate–Takanosu
- November 1, 1901: Takanosu–Noshiro (present-day Higashi–Noshiro)
- August 1, 1902: Noshiro–Gojōme (present-day Hachirōgata)
- October 21, 1902: Gojōme–Akita
- October 1, 1903: Akita–Wada
- August 21, 1904: Wada–Jingūji
- December 21, 1904: Jingūji–Ōmagari
- June 15, 1905: Ōmagari–Yokote

=== Ōu South Line ===
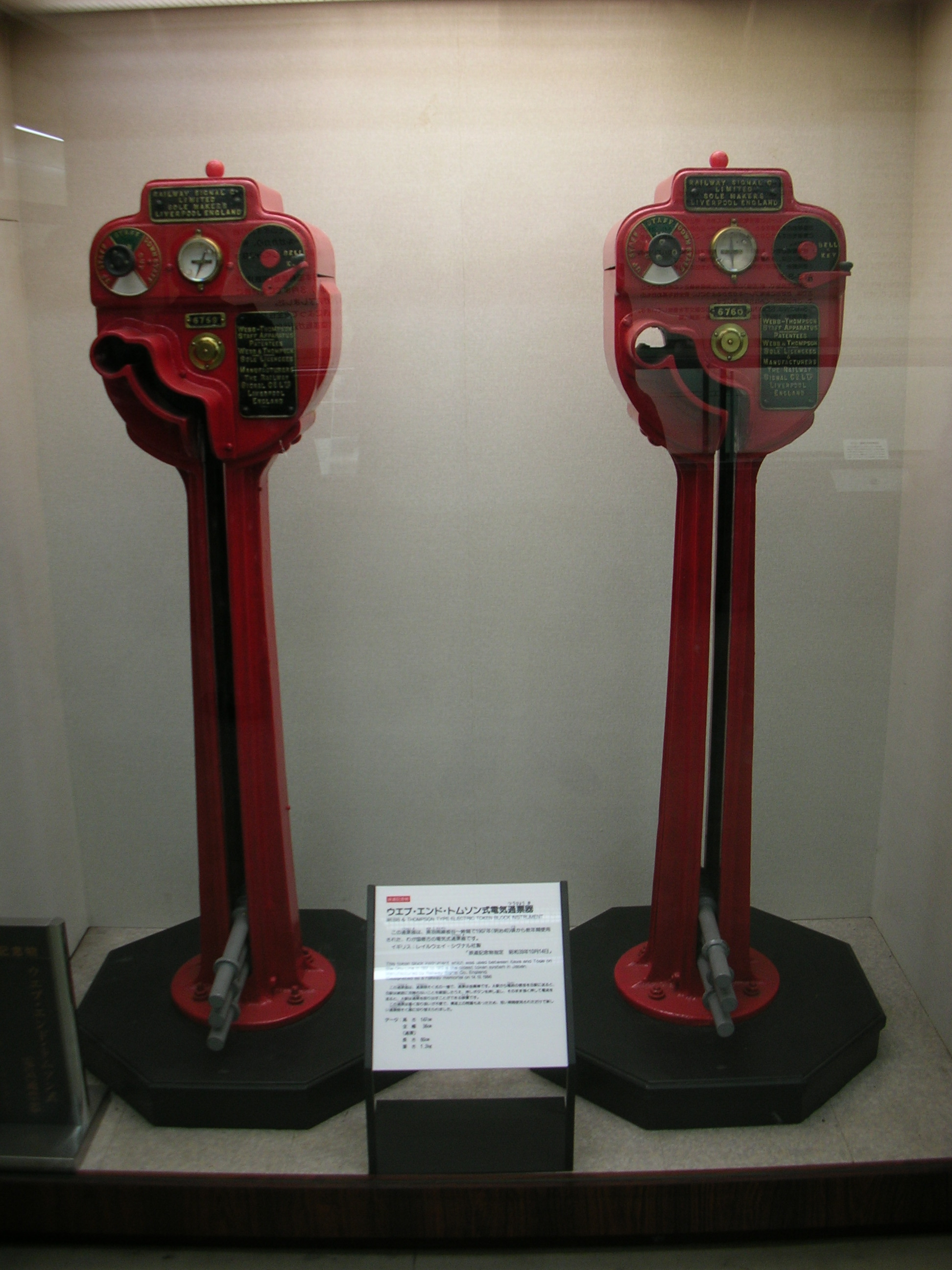
Webb and Thompson large staff instruments used on the Ōu South Line

- May 15, 1899: Fukushima–Yonezawa
- April 11, 1901: Yonezawa–Yamagata
- August 23, 1901: Yamagata–Tateoka (present-day Murayama)
- October 21, 1901: Tateoka–Ōishida
- July 21, 1902: Ōishida–Funagata
- June 11, 1903: Funagata–Shinjō
- October 21, 1904: Shinjō–Innai
- July 5, 1905: Innai–Yuzawa
- September 14, 1905: Yuzawa–Yokote, completion of Fukushima–Aomori connection

=== Line upgrading ===
Various sections of the line have been double-tracked since 1963.

The section between Niwasaka and Akaiwa stations proved to be geologically unstable, with one of the original tunnels collapsing in 1910. A realignment involving two new tunnels was opened a year later. Geological instability was suspected as the cause of a derailment on the section in 1948 that killed three crewmen, and another realignment was undertaken when the section was double-tracked in 1968.

Itaya station was originally a reversing station, and was realigned as a through station in conjunction with the gauge conversion work (see below) in 1990.

=== Electrification ===
The Fukushima to Yonezawa section was electrified at 1,500 V DC in 1949, and the Uzen-Chitose–Yamagata section in conjunction with the Senzan Line (also at 1,500 V DC) in 1960. Trials on the Senzan Line subsequently resulted in the adoption of 20 kV AC for all further electrification, and the abovementioned sections were converted to the new standard when the Yonezawa to Yamagata section was electrified in 1968. The Aomori to Akita section was electrified (at 20 kV AC) in 1971, as was the Akita to Uzen-Chitose section in 1975. Following a severe rainstorm in July 2024 that necessitated a months-long closure of the line between Shinjō and Innai, the track structure was repaired but the electrification system was decommissioned on the section.

=== Former connecting lines ===
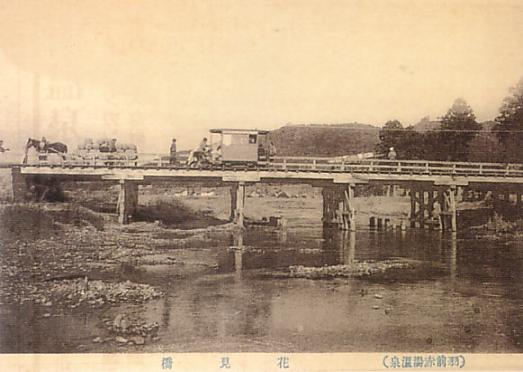
Akayu human-powered tramway

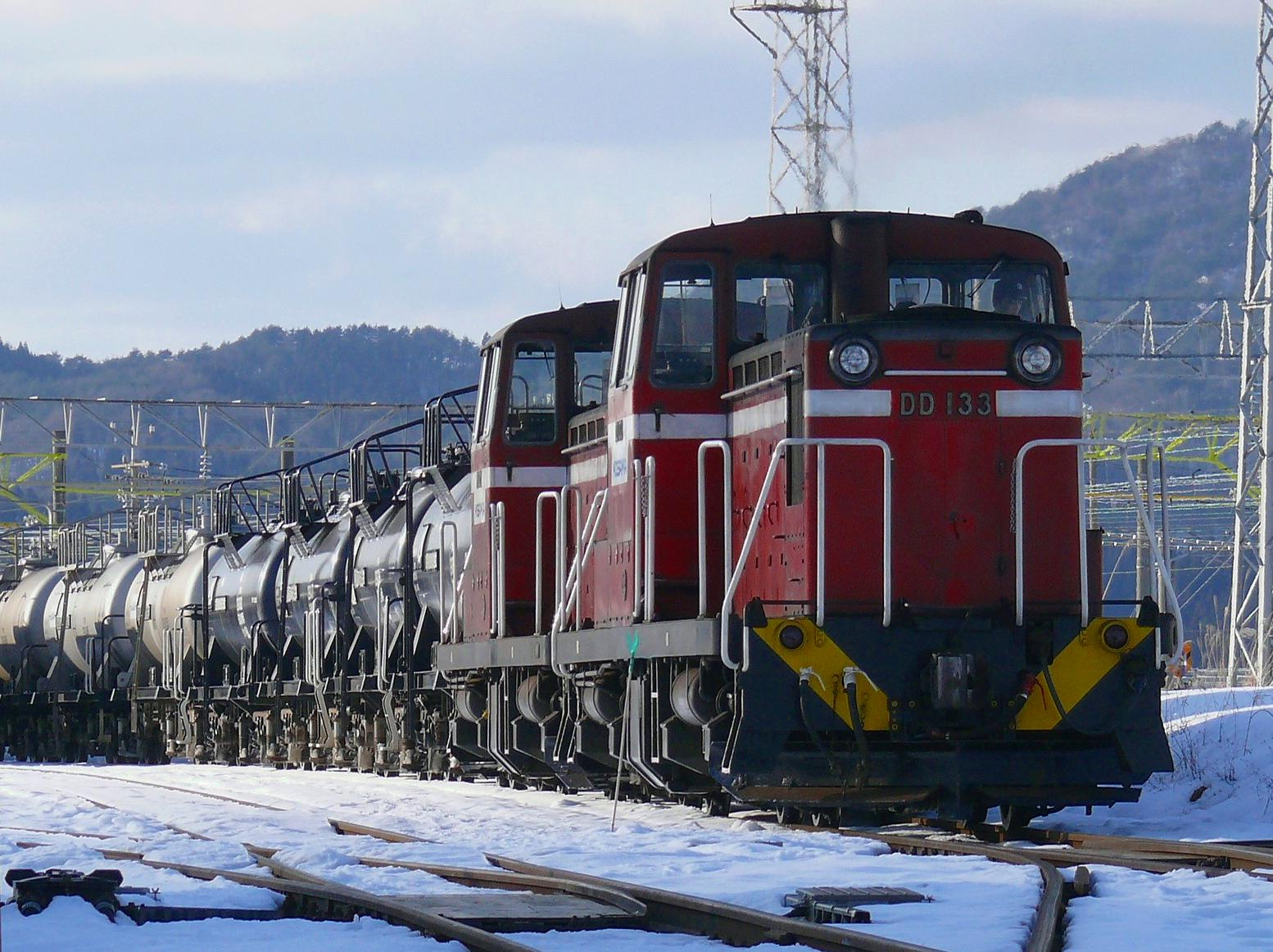
Kosaka Railway sulphuric acid train in its final year of operation

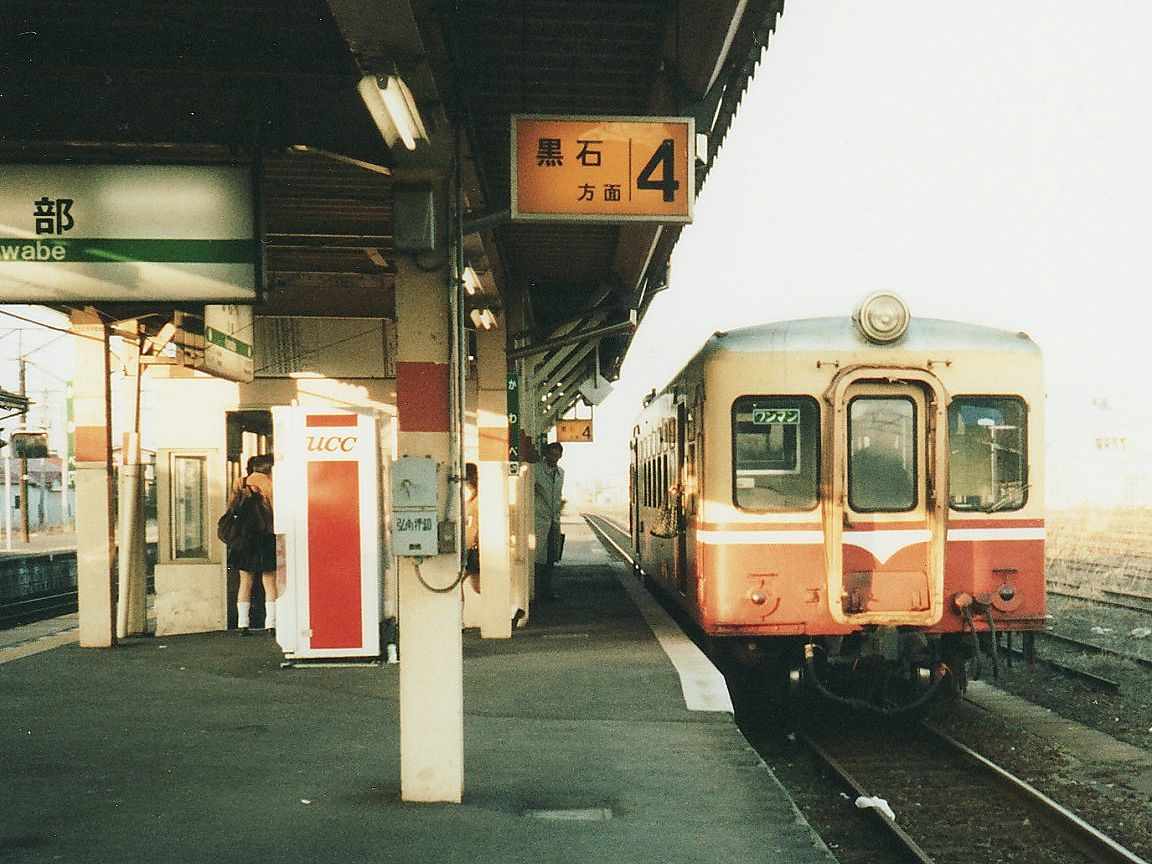
Kawabe station with a Konan Railway train bound for Kuroishi in 1997

- Akayu Station: The Yamagata Prefectural Government operated a 2 km (1.2 mi) 610 mm (2 ft) gauge human powered tramway between 1919 and 1926.
- Oishida Station: The Obabazawa Railway opened a 3 km (1.9 mi) line to its namesake town in 1916, the line closed in 1970.
- Yuzawa Station: The Ogachi Railway Co. opened a 12 km (7.5 mi) line to Zentsu, electrified at 600 V DC, between 1928 and 1935. The last 3 km section closed in 1967, the electrification was decommissioned in 1971 and the rest of the line closed in 1973.
- Yokote Station: The Yokote Railway opened a 38 km (24 mi) line to Oikata between 1918 and 1930. Construction commenced on an extension to Maego station on the company's Yuri Kogen Railway Chokai Sanroku Line but was not completed. The 12 km section from Oikata to Niiyama was closed following typhoon damage in 1947, the 7 km (4.3 mi) section from Niiyama to Tateai closed in 1965 when a bridge was destroyed by floodwaters, and the balance of the line closed in 1971.
- Akita Station: The 762 mm (2 ft 6.0 in) gauge Nibetsu Forest Railway, consisting of a 22 km (14 mi) main line and five branches between 1.3 km (0.81 mi) and 5 km (3.1 mi) in length (and a 550 m (1,800 ft) tunnel) operated between 1909 and 1968.
- Hachirogata Station: The Akita Chuo Kotsu operated a 4 km (2.5 mi) line to Gojome, electrified at 600 V DC, from 1922 until 1969.
- Odate Station: The Kosaka Railway opened a 23 km (14 mi) 762 mm (2 ft 6 in) gauge line to its Kosaka Refinery in 1908, together with a 4 km branch from Shigenai to Kizawa the following year. Passenger services ceased on the Kizawa branch in 1926, and it closed in 1951. The 10 km (6.2 mi) Kosaka to Shigenai section was electrified in 1928, and extended 6 km (3.7 mi) in 1949, but was decommissioned when the line was converted to 1,067 mm (3 ft 6 in) in 1962. Passenger services ended in 1994, and the remaining traffic was sulphuric acid, but following two major derailments the line closed in 2009.

The company also opened a 5 km 762 mm (2 ft 6 in) gauge line to the Hanaoka mine in 1914 including a bridge over the Ōu Main Line at Odate, which was converted to 1,067 mm gauge in 1951 to enable ore wagons to be forwarded via JNR trains. Freight services ceased in 1983 and the line closed in 1985.

- Kawabe Station: The 7 km line to Kuroishi was opened in 1912, transferred to the Konan Railway in 1984, the year that freight services ceased, and closed in 1998.

== Gauge conversion ==
Full standard Shinkansen lines are constructed using 1,435 mm gauge track on a separate alignment, with a high speed (240–320 km/h or 150–200 mph) and a commensurately high construction cost. Following privatisation and regionalisation of the JNR network in 1987, the JR East company decided to convert the Fukushima–Yamagata section of the 1,067 mm gauge Ōu Main line to 1,435 mm gauge, enabling Shinkansen trains from Yamagata to travel on the Tohoku Shinkansen line through to Tokyo. Called Mini-shinkansen, this was a cost-effective way of providing an improved level of service on the line, although only purpose-built Shinkansen trains can travel on such lines, as the loading gauge was not changed, nor the voltage (full standard Shinkansen lines use 25 kV AC). The Yamagata Shinkansen opened in 1992, and although the maximum speed is 130 km/h (81 mph), the overall transit time to places beyond Fukushima is improved due to the elimination of the need to change trains at the junction.

The success of this project led to the conversion of the Omagari to Akita section in conjunction with the opening of the Akita Shinkansen in 1997, and the extension of the Yamagata Shinkansen to Shinjo in 1999. These projects also created parallel 1,435 and 1,067 mm gauge lines between Omagari and Akita and between Yamagata and Uzen-Chitose respectively, and a dual-gauge section between Jinguji and Minejoshikawa (on the Omagari to Akita section), enabling Shinkansen trains to pass at speed on the mostly single-track line.

Additionally, local services continue to be provided on the gauge-converted lines by 701-5000 series standard-gauge suburban/interurban rolling stock.

== Rolling stock ==
=== Local ===
- 701-5000 series
- 719-5500 series
- E723 series
- KiHa 100 series

=== Limited Express ===
- E751 series

=== Shinkansen ===
- E6 series Shinkansen
- E8 series Shinkansen
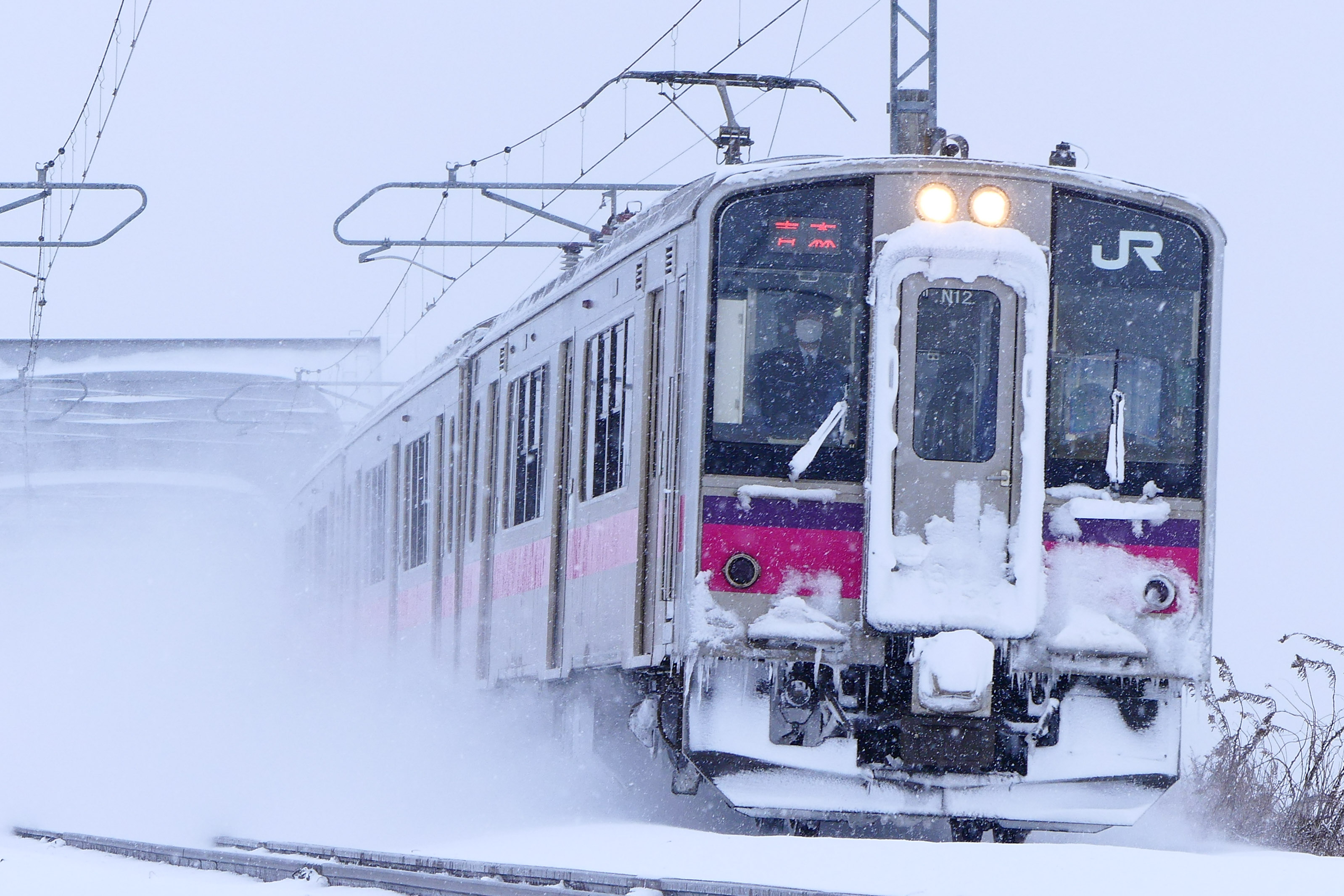
701 series

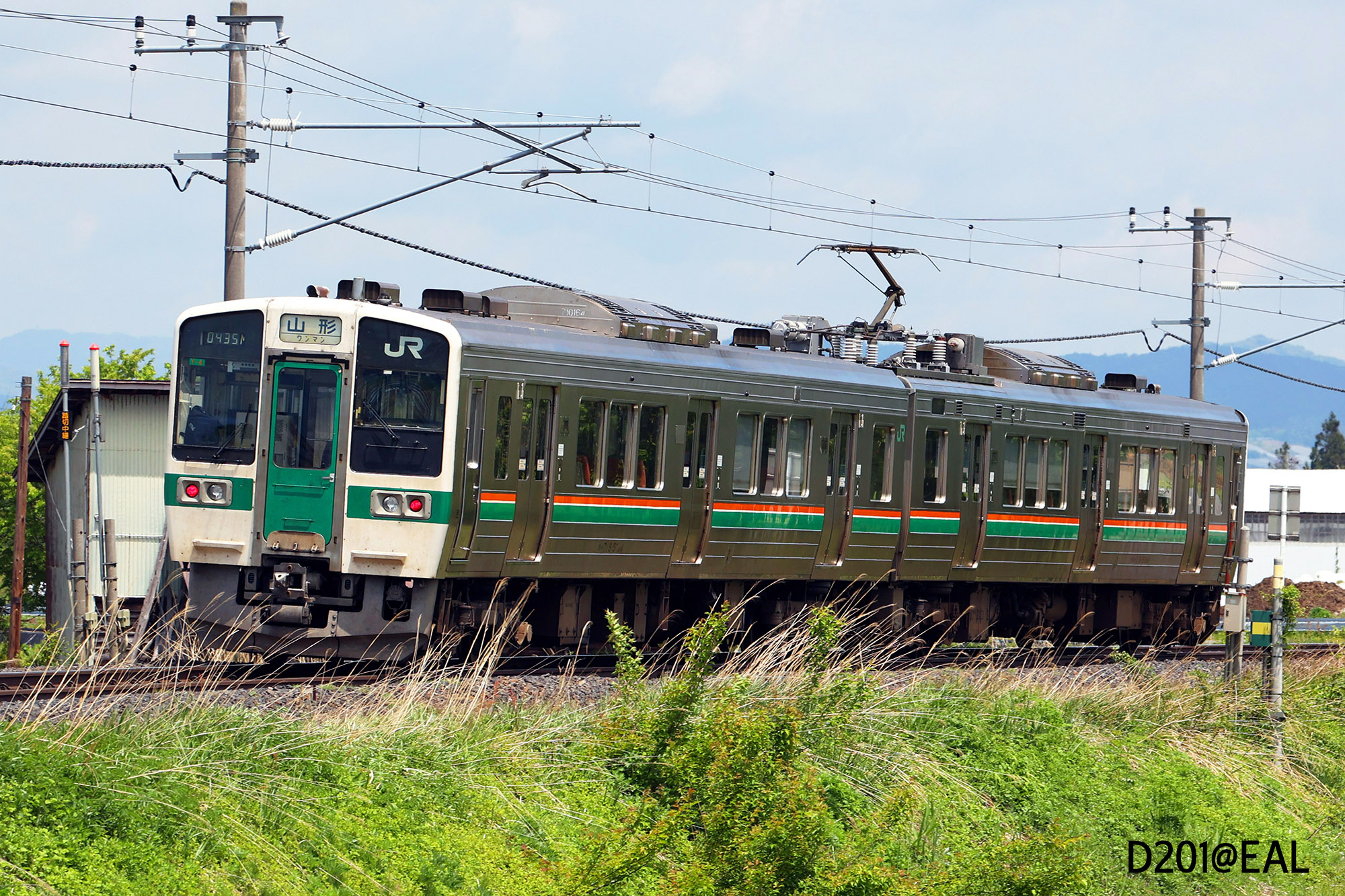
719 series

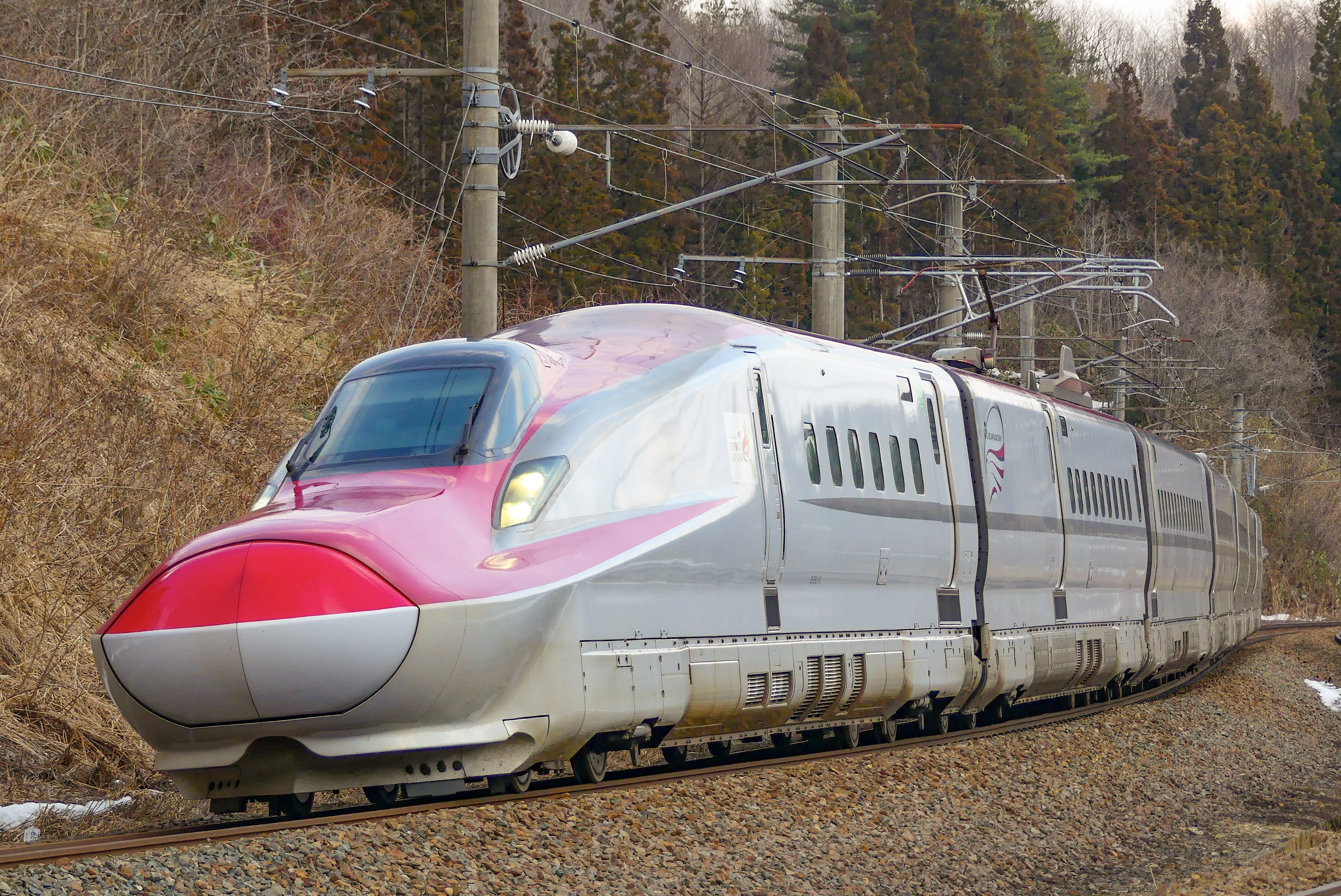
E6 series Shinkansen

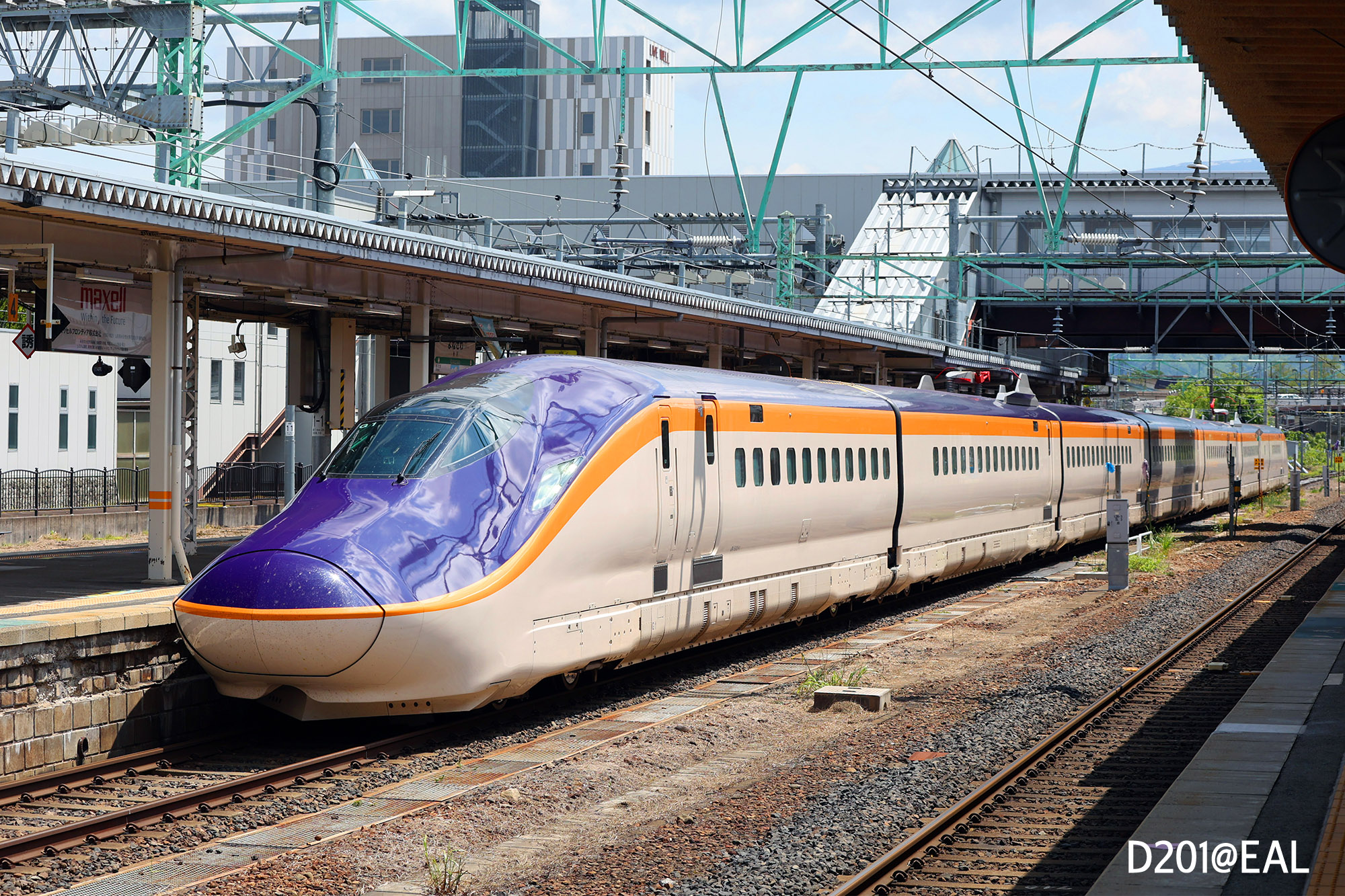
E8 series

=== Future plans ===
JR East announced on 26 November 2025 that the 701 series and 719 series would be replaced by E723 series trainsets by late 2026.
