= Japan National Route 347 =

National highway in Japan

National Route 347
- 国道347号
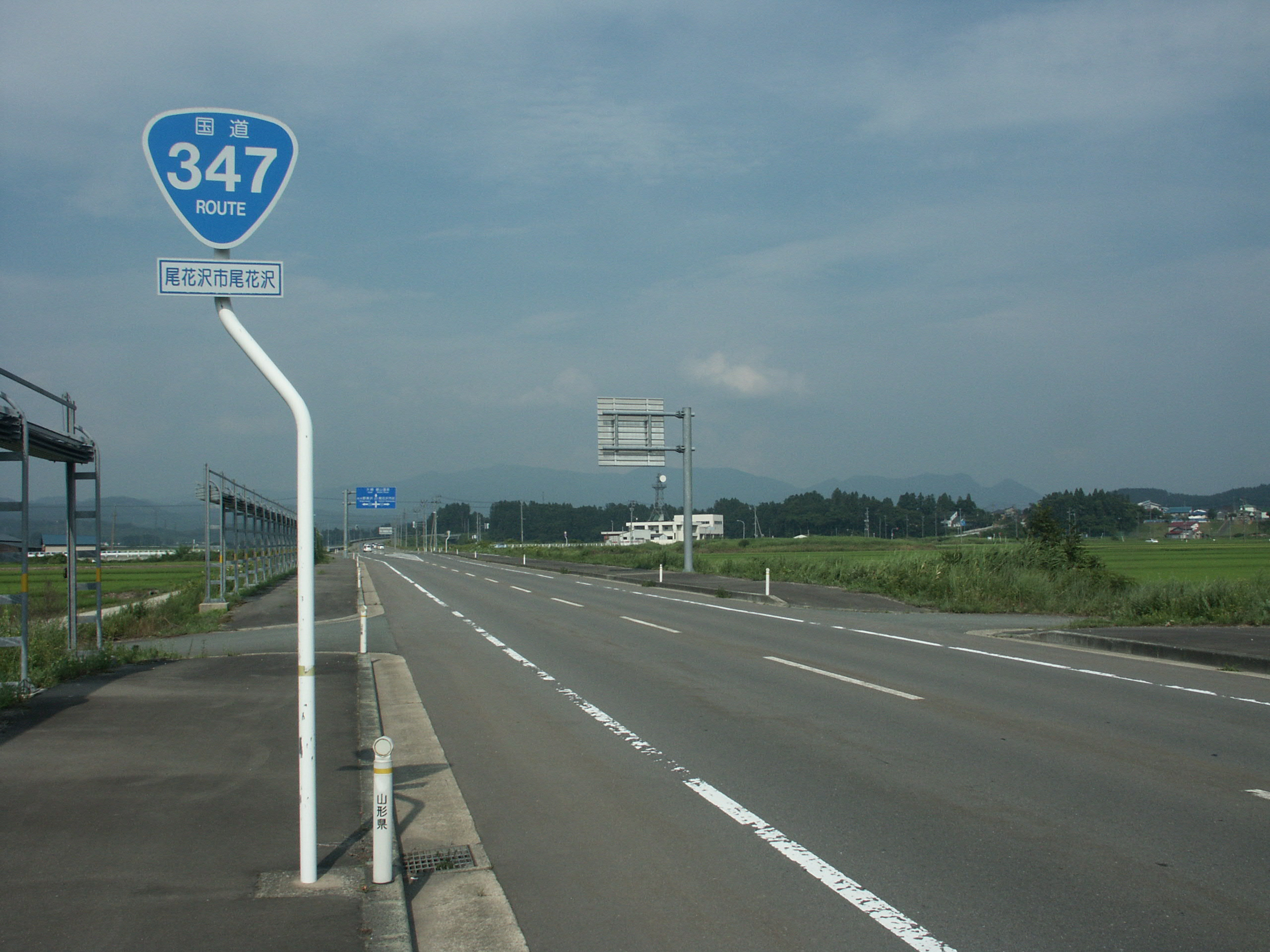

Route information
- Length: 90.1 km (56.0 mi)

Location
- Country: Japan

Highway system
- National highways of Japan; Expressways of Japan
← National Route 346	→ National Route 348

National Route 347 is a national highway of Japan connecting Sagae, Yamagata and Ōsaki, Miyagi in Japan, with a total length of 90.1 km (55.99 mi).

A segment of Route 347 between Obanazawa, Yamagata and Kami, Miyagi is closed in winter.
