= Yuzawa, Akita =

Yuzawa 湯沢市
- City
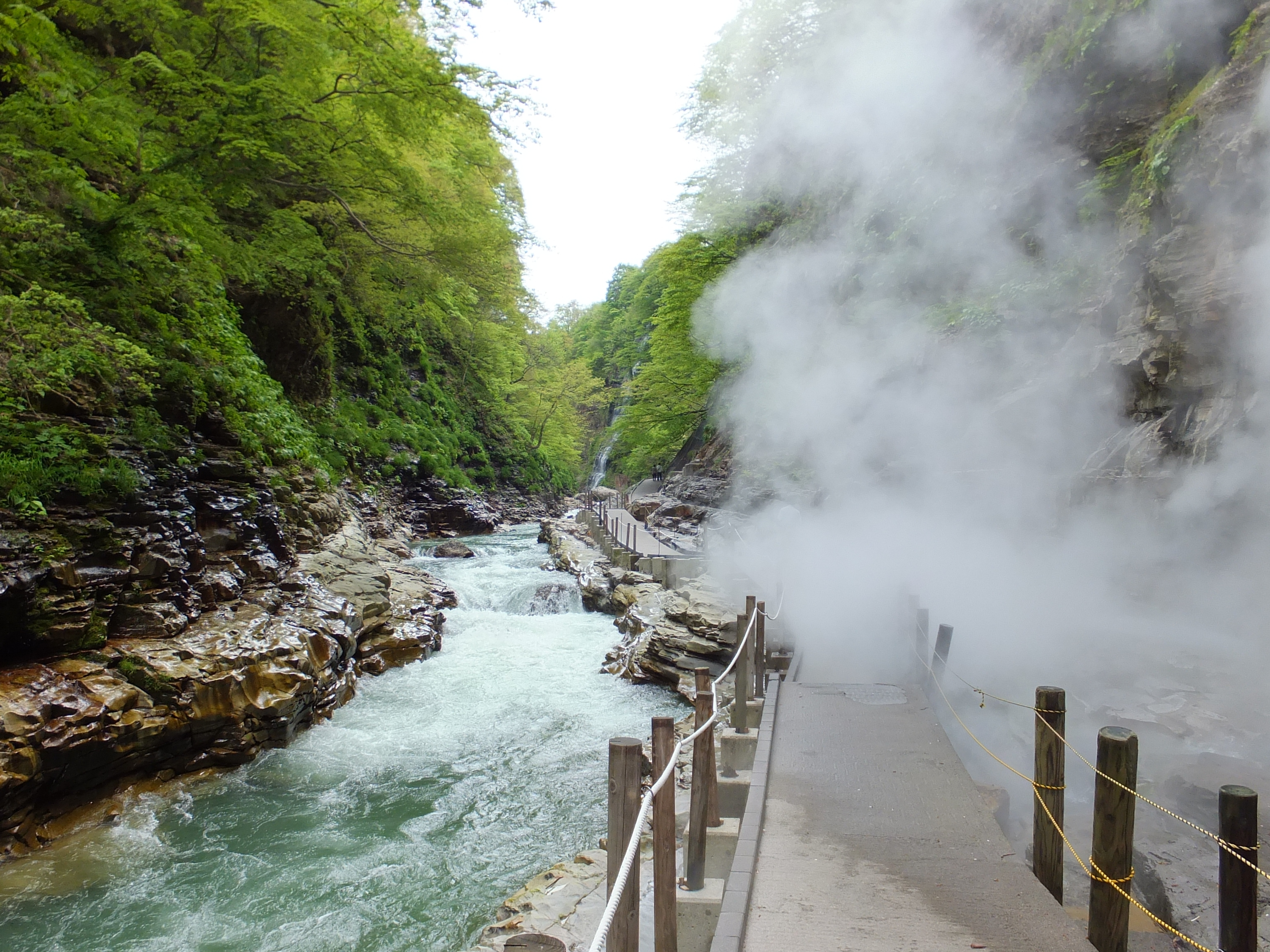

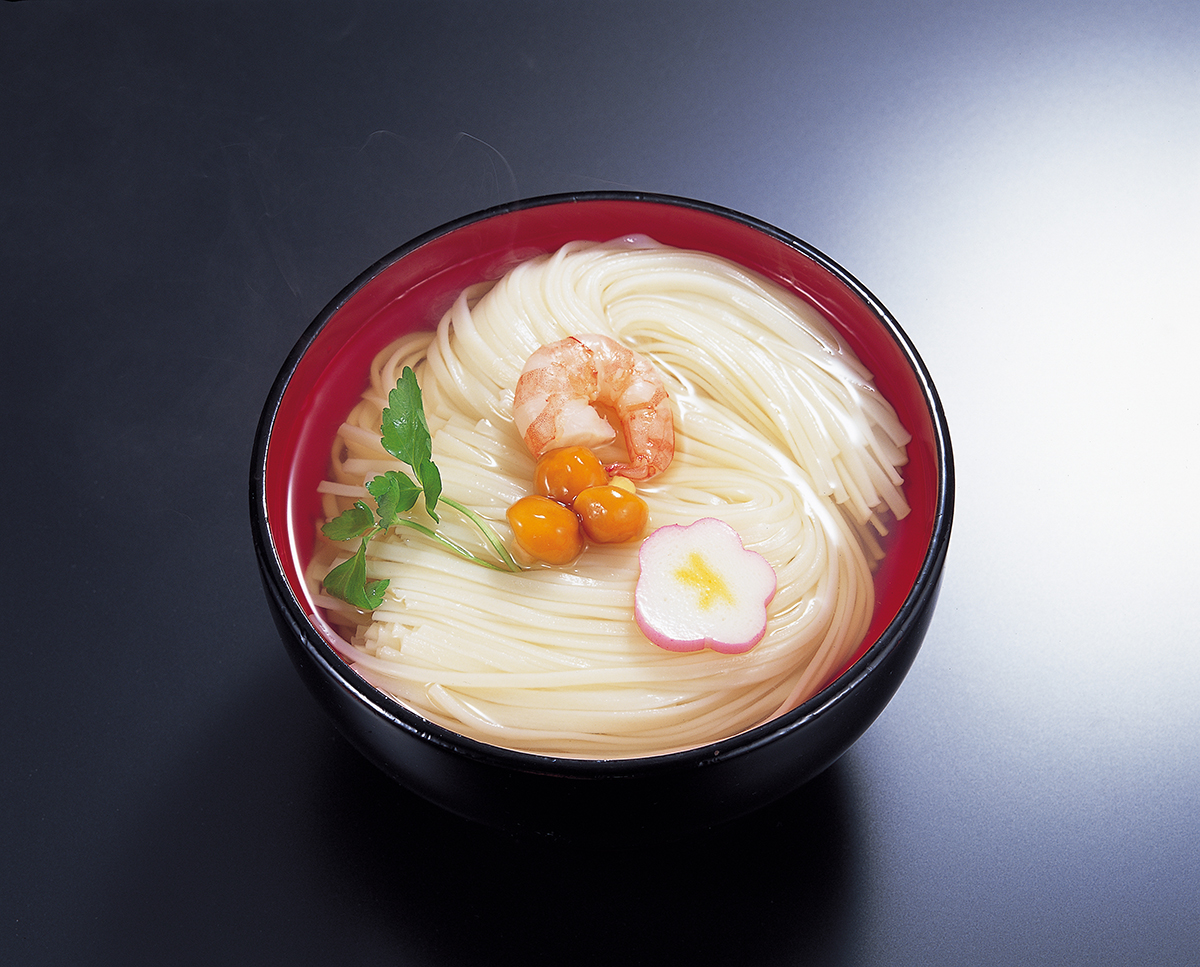

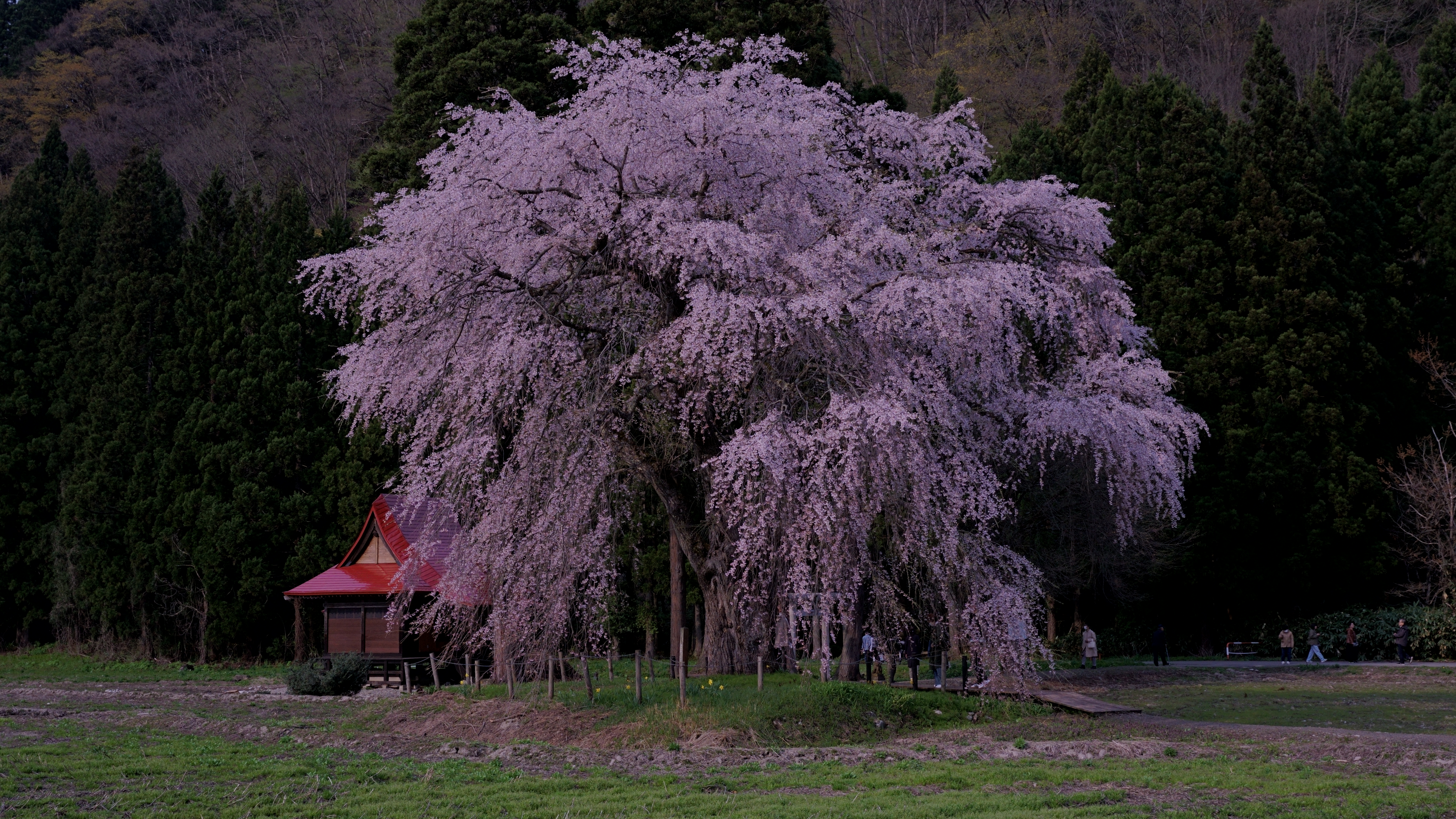

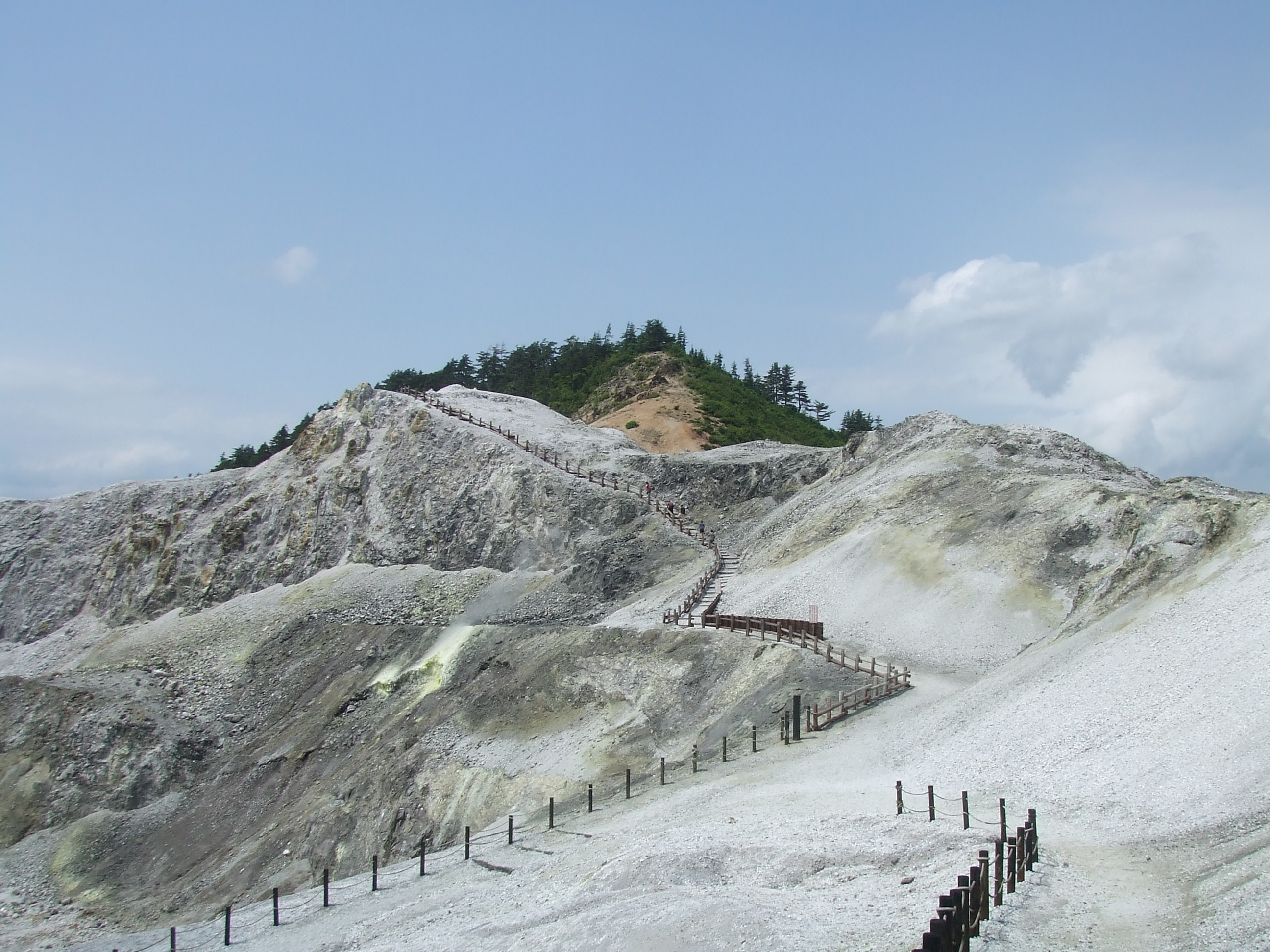

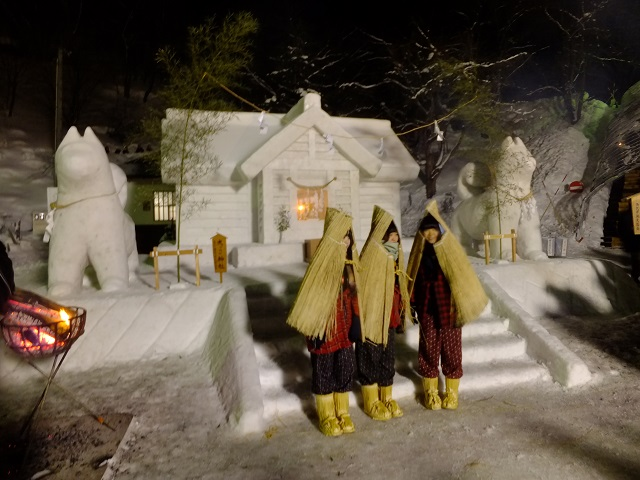

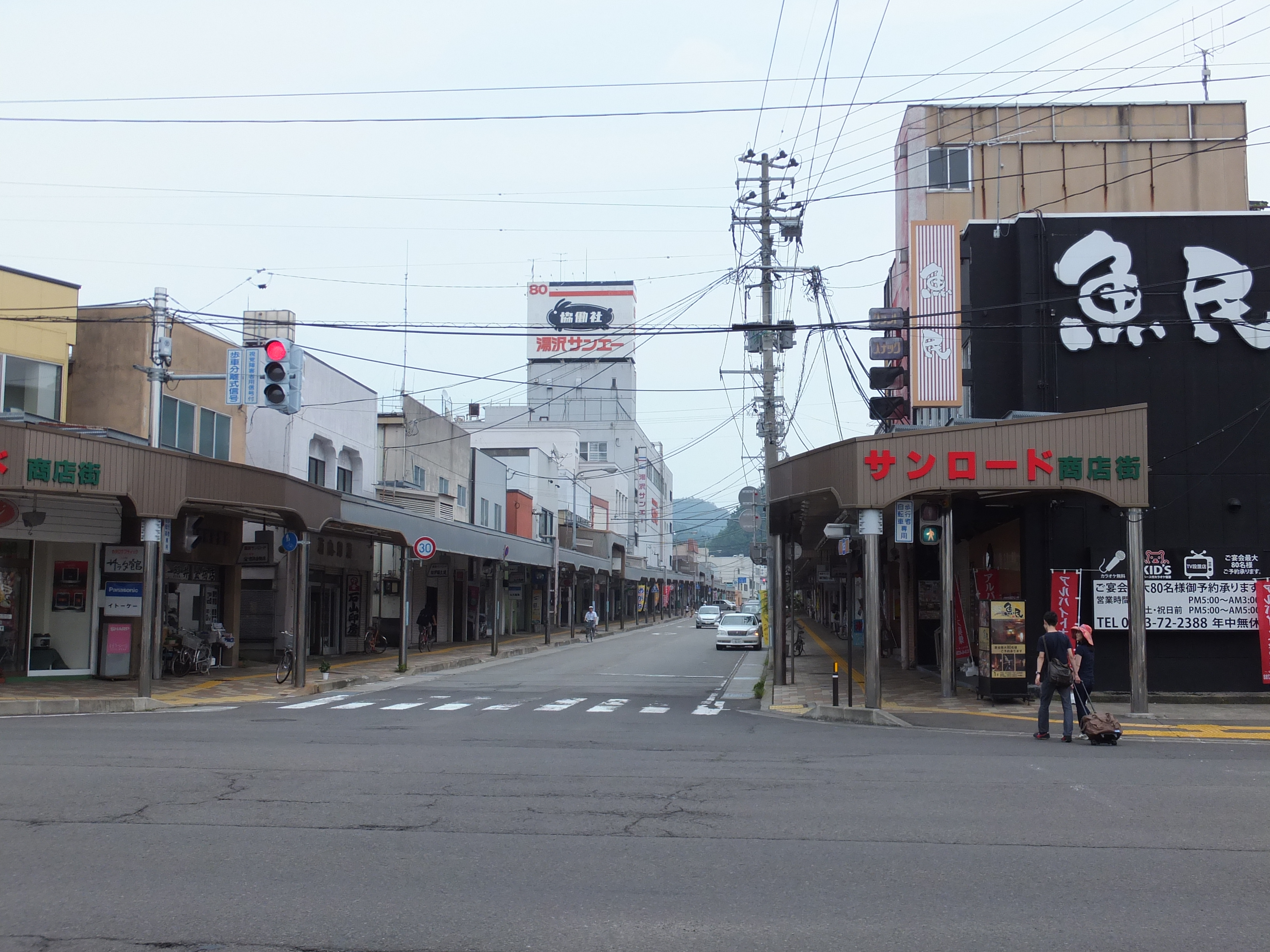
Oyasu-kyo	Inaniwa Udon
Oshirasama-no-Shidare-zakura	Kawarage Jigoku
Inukko Festival	Central Yuzawa
- Flag Seal
- Location of Yuzawa in Akita Prefecture

- Coordinates: 39°9′50.7″N 140°29′41.4″E
- Country: Japan
- Region: Tōhoku
- Prefecture: Akita

Government
  - -Mayor: Kazu Satō

Area
  - Total: 790.91 km^{2} (305.37 sq mi)

Population (January 31, 2023)
  - Total: 41,404
  - Density: 52.350/km^{2} (135.59/sq mi)
- Time zone: UTC+9 (Japan Standard Time)
- Phone number: 0183-73-2111
- Address: 1-1 Satakechō, Yuzawa-shi, Akita-ken 012-8501
- Climate: Dfa
- Website: Official website
- Symbols
- Bird: Copper pheasant
- Flower: Cherry blossom
- Tree: Japanese zelkova

Yuzawa (湯沢市, Yuzawa-shi) is a city located in Akita Prefecture, Japan. As of 31 January 2023, the city had an estimated population of 41,404 in 17,551 households and a population density of 52 persons per km^{2}. The total area of the city is 790.91 km^{2} (305.37 sq mi). Yuzawa claims to be the birthplace of the famous Heian period poet Ono no Komachi.

== Geography ==
Yuzawa is located at the far southeast corner of Akita Prefecture in the southern part of the Yokote Basin, sandwiched between the Ōu Mountains to the east and the Dewa Mountains to the west. It has a lot of snow in winter, so the entire area is designated as a special heavy snowfall area. The urban area is located in the south of the Yokote Basin, and spreads out in the alluvial fan of the Kaneuchisawa River on the eastern side of the Omono River.

=== Neighboring municipalities ===
Akita Prefecture

- Higashinaruse
- Ugo
- Yurihonjō
- Yokote

Miyagi Prefecture

- Kurihara
- Ōsaki

Yamagata Prefecture

- Kaneyama
- Mamurogawa
- Mogami
- Shinjō

== Climate ==
Yuzawa has a humid continental climate (Köppen climate classification Dfa) with large seasonal temperature differences, with warm to hot (and often humid) summers and cold (sometimes severely cold) winters. Precipitation is significant throughout the year, but is heaviest from August to October. The average annual temperature in Yuzawa is 10.8 °C (51.4 °F). The average annual rainfall is 1,567.4 mm (61.71 in) with December as the wettest month. The temperatures are highest on average in August, at around 24.0 °C (75.2 °F), and lowest in January, at around −1.5 °C (29.3 °F).

Climate data for Yuzawa (elevation 74 m, 1991–2020 normals, extremes 1976–present)
Month	Jan	Feb	Mar	Apr	May	Jun	Jul	Aug	Sep	Oct	Nov	Dec	Year
Record high °C (°F)	11.0 (51.8)	19.7 (67.5)	20.5 (68.9)	29.9 (85.8)	32.5 (90.5)	33.8 (92.8)	37.4 (99.3)	36.2 (97.2)	35.0 (95.0)	30.4 (86.7)	25.2 (77.4)	17.3 (63.1)	37.4 (99.3)
Mean daily maximum °C (°F)	1.4 (34.5)	2.3 (36.1)	6.3 (43.3)	14.6 (58.3)	20.9 (69.6)	24.7 (76.5)	27.7 (81.9)	29.2 (84.6)	25.0 (77.0)	18.6 (65.5)	11.4 (52.5)	4.2 (39.6)	15.5 (59.9)
Daily mean °C (°F)	−1.5 (29.3)	−1.1 (30.0)	1.9 (35.4)	8.5 (47.3)	14.9 (58.8)	19.4 (66.9)	22.9 (73.2)	24.0 (75.2)	19.7 (67.5)	13.1 (55.6)	6.7 (44.1)	0.9 (33.6)	10.8 (51.4)
Mean daily minimum °C (°F)	−5.0 (23.0)	−4.9 (23.2)	−2.3 (27.9)	2.7 (36.9)	9.1 (48.4)	14.8 (58.6)	19.0 (66.2)	19.6 (67.3)	15.2 (59.4)	8.3 (46.9)	2.3 (36.1)	−2.2 (28.0)	6.4 (43.5)
Record low °C (°F)	−16.4 (2.5)	−18.6 (−1.5)	−14.7 (5.5)	−6.7 (19.9)	0.0 (32.0)	6.0 (42.8)	9.3 (48.7)	11.1 (52.0)	4.3 (39.7)	−1.0 (30.2)	−9.4 (15.1)	−13.5 (7.7)	−18.6 (−1.5)
Average precipitation mm (inches)	155.8 (6.13)	94.2 (3.71)	80.8 (3.18)	69.8 (2.75)	86.6 (3.41)	104.9 (4.13)	172.8 (6.80)	166.1 (6.54)	137.6 (5.42)	141.2 (5.56)	164.2 (6.46)	189.0 (7.44)	1,567.4 (61.71)
Average snowfall cm (inches)	266 (105)	195 (77)	99 (39)	7 (2.8)	0 (0)	0 (0)	0 (0)	0 (0)	0 (0)	0 (0)	16 (6.3)	177 (70)	754 (297)
Average precipitation days (≥ 1.0 mm)	23.4	19.2	16.7	12.1	10.9	10.8	13.0	12.2	12.6	14.5	18.6	23.0	187.5
Average snowy days (≥ 5 cm)	18.9	14.5	7.7	0.6	0.0	0.0	0.0	0.0	0.0	0.0	1.4	11.5	54.4
Mean monthly sunshine hours	30.7	49.3	98.7	166.6	194.9	178.0	151.2	180.7	145.3	127.3	87.7	39.8	1,453.4
Source: Japan Meteorological Agency (1991–2020 normals, extremes 1976–present)

Climate data for Yunotai, Yuzawa (elevation 335 m, 1991–2020 normals, extremes 1976–present)
Month	Jan	Feb	Mar	Apr	May	Jun	Jul	Aug	Sep	Oct	Nov	Dec	Year
Record high °C (°F)	11.6 (52.9)	16.1 (61.0)	17.4 (63.3)	27.6 (81.7)	31.2 (88.2)	31.4 (88.5)	35.3 (95.5)	35.1 (95.2)	32.4 (90.3)	27.9 (82.2)	22.9 (73.2)	17.3 (63.1)	35.3 (95.5)
Mean daily maximum °C (°F)	0.4 (32.7)	1.3 (34.3)	5.2 (41.4)	12.3 (54.1)	19.0 (66.2)	22.7 (72.9)	25.9 (78.6)	27.3 (81.1)	22.9 (73.2)	16.7 (62.1)	10.0 (50.0)	3.2 (37.8)	13.9 (57.0)
Daily mean °C (°F)	−2.2 (28.0)	−1.9 (28.6)	1.0 (33.8)	6.7 (44.1)	13.3 (55.9)	17.6 (63.7)	21.3 (70.3)	22.3 (72.1)	18.2 (64.8)	11.9 (53.4)	5.7 (42.3)	0.2 (32.4)	9.5 (49.1)
Mean daily minimum °C (°F)	−5.0 (23.0)	−5.0 (23.0)	−2.6 (27.3)	1.8 (35.2)	7.9 (46.2)	13.0 (55.4)	17.6 (63.7)	18.6 (65.5)	14.4 (57.9)	7.8 (46.0)	1.9 (35.4)	−2.4 (27.7)	5.7 (42.3)
Record low °C (°F)	−15.5 (4.1)	−15.3 (4.5)	−11.5 (11.3)	−7.4 (18.7)	−0.8 (30.6)	3.9 (39.0)	8.4 (47.1)	9.8 (49.6)	2.3 (36.1)	−1.0 (30.2)	−6.2 (20.8)	−12.1 (10.2)	−15.5 (4.1)
Average precipitation mm (inches)	197.8 (7.79)	135.8 (5.35)	142.5 (5.61)	124.2 (4.89)	128.6 (5.06)	139.9 (5.51)	237.5 (9.35)	210.2 (8.28)	179.4 (7.06)	177.7 (7.00)	201.4 (7.93)	229.2 (9.02)	2,104.2 (82.84)
Average snowfall cm (inches)	295 (116)	213 (84)	152 (60)	28 (11)	0 (0)	0 (0)	0 (0)	0 (0)	0 (0)	0 (0)	26 (10)	198 (78)	913 (359)
Average precipitation days (≥ 1.0 mm)	24.8	20.7	19.0	14.6	12.9	12.0	14.7	13.4	13.9	14.7	18.8	23.9	203.2
Mean monthly sunshine hours	22.5	41.3	93.7	148.1	183.7	160.2	133.9	164.7	127.1	116.9	75.5	33.9	1,301.7
Source: Japan Meteorological Agency (1991–2020 normals, extremes 1976–present)

== Demographics ==
Japanese census data, the population of Yuzawa peaked in the 1950s and has declined since. The city is now smaller than it was a century ago.

Historical population
Year	Pop.	±% p.a.
1920	55,439	—
1930	60,550	+0.89%
1940	64,073	+0.57%
1950	79,056	+2.12%
1960	77,405	−0.21%
1970	68,621	−1.20%
1980	65,532	−0.46%
1990	62,537	−0.47%
2000	58,504	−0.66%
2010	50,863	−1.39%
2020	42,091	−1.88%

== History ==
The area of present-day Yuzawa was part of ancient Ugo Province, dominated by the Satake clan during the Edo period, who ruled Kubota Domain under the Tokugawa shogunate. Much of the territory was part of the 20,000 koku subsidiary feudal domain of Iwasaki Domain (岩崎藩, Iwasaki-han).

After the start of the Meiji period, Iwasaki Domain became briefly “Iwasaki Prefecture”, before becoming Ogachi District, Akita Prefecture in 1878. The towns of Iwasaki and Yuzawa were created with the establishment of the modern municipalities system on April 1, 1889, becoming the city of Yuzawa on March 31, 1954.

On March 22, 2005, the towns of Inakawa, Minase and Ogachi (all from Ogachi District) were merged into Yuzawa.

== Government ==
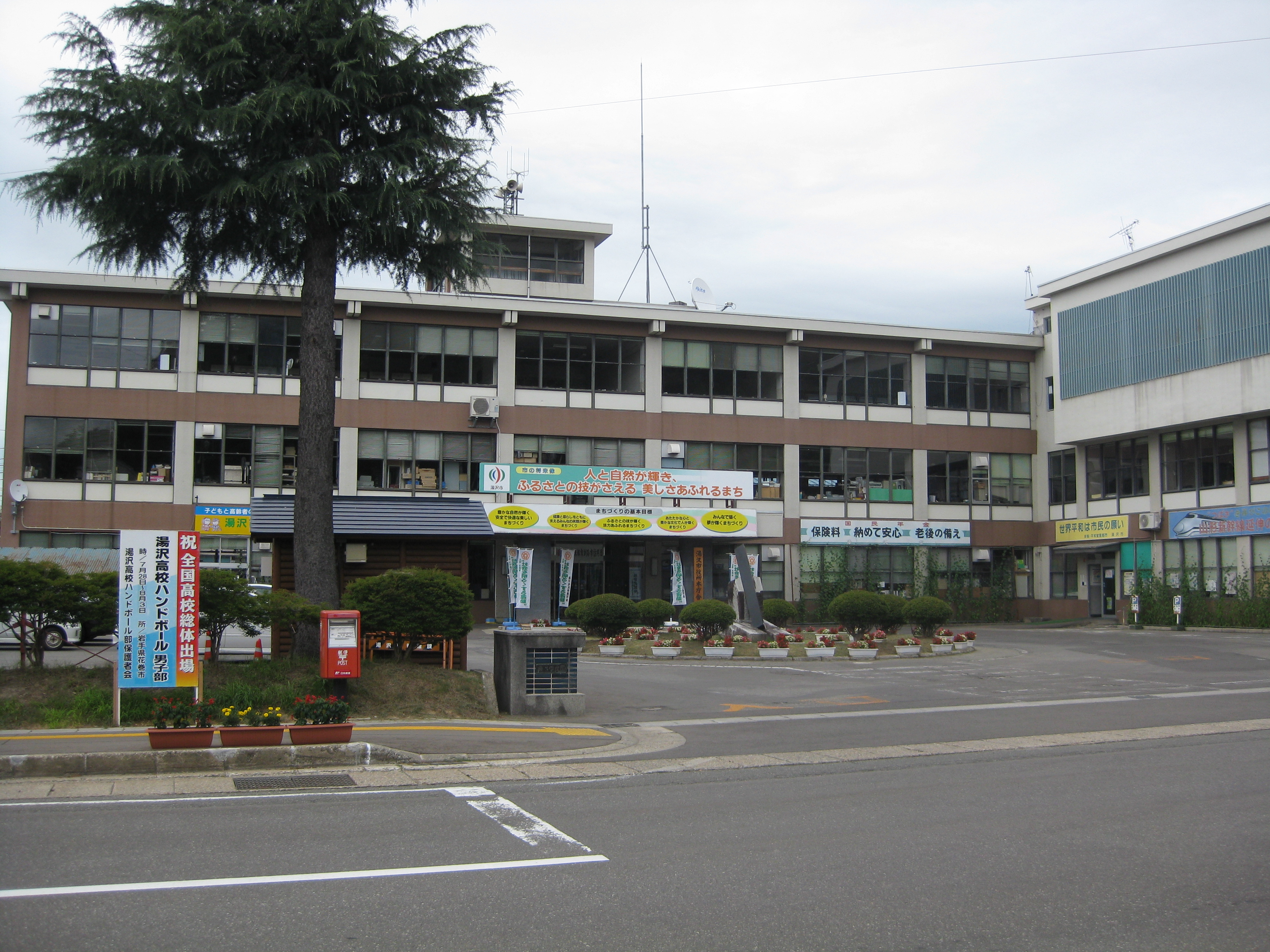
Yuzawa City Hall

Yuzawa has a mayor-council form of government with a directly elected mayor and a unicameral city legislature of 18 members. The city (together with the towns and villages of Ogachi District) contributes three members to the Akita Prefectural Assembly. In terms of national politics, the city is part of Akita District 3 of the lower house of the Diet of Japan.

=== Elections ===
- 2005 Yuzawa mayoral election

== Economy ==
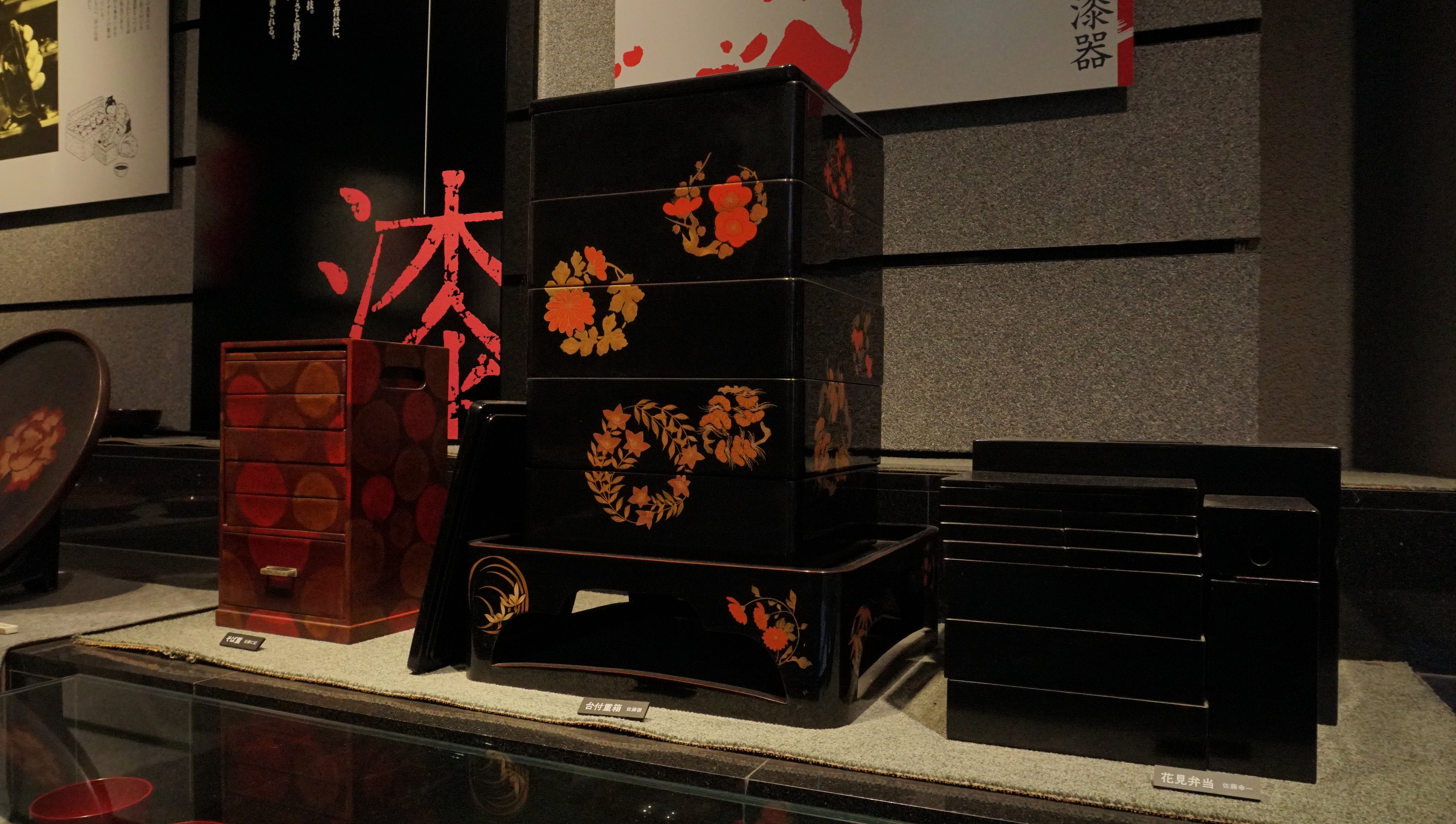
Kawatsura lacquerware

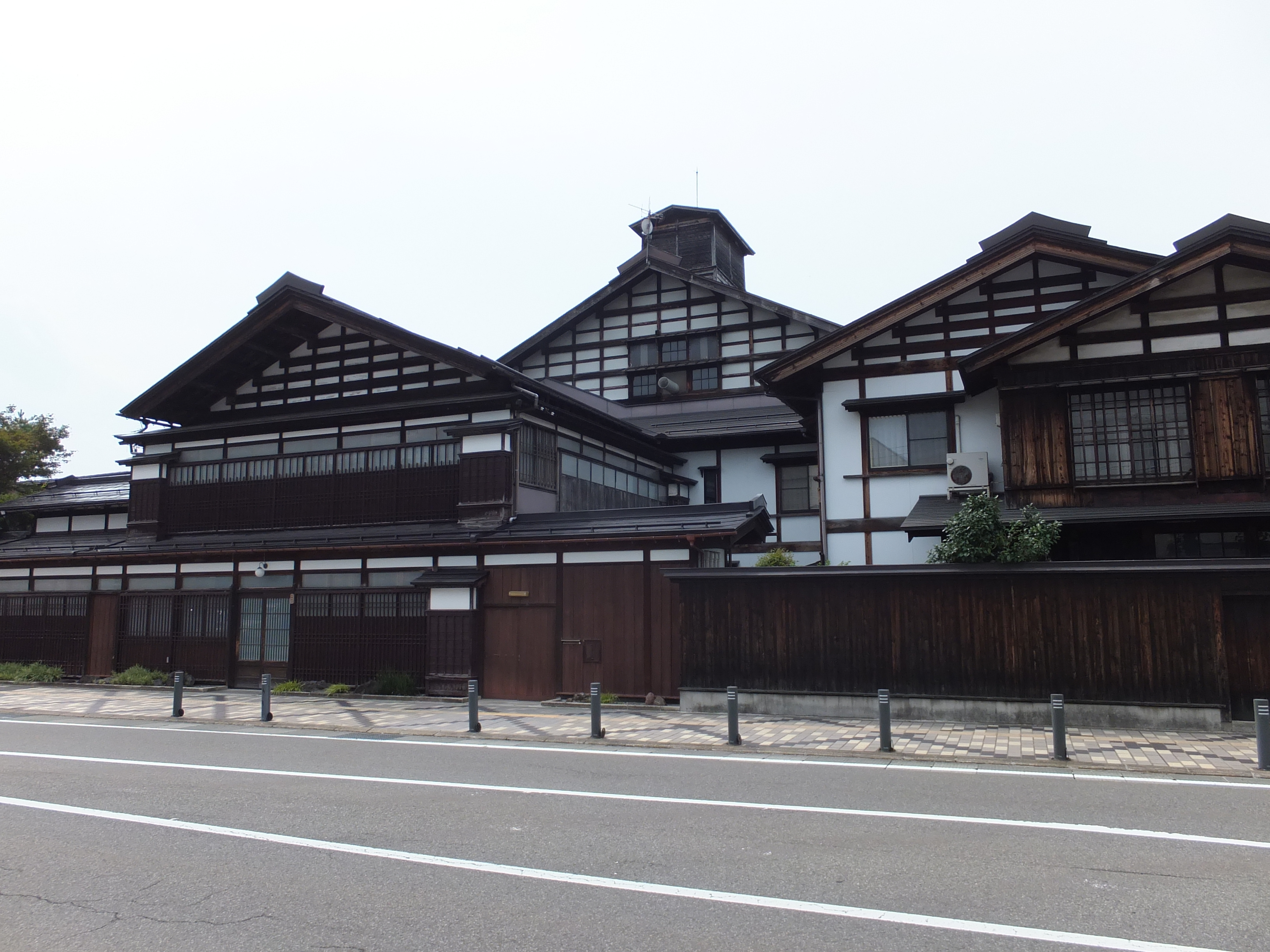
Ryozeki Brewery

The economy of Yuzawa is based on agriculture, primarily rice cultivation, and the brewing of sake. The production of sake in Yuzawa accounts for about 70% of the total amount in Akita prefecture and the city positions sake brewing as one of the key industries. Sake brewing in Yuzawa had been known through the Edo period since the area included Innai Silver Mine, a large consumption area comparable to the jōkamachi of Kubota Domain. At its highest, it had more than 20 breweries and some still operate to this day.

== Education ==
Yuzawa has six public elementary schools and six public middle schools operated by the city government and two public high schools operated by the Akita Prefectural Board of Education. The prefecture also operates one special education school for the handicapped.

== Media ==
FM Yutopia (JOZZ2AN-FM) is the only radio station located in Yuzawa. It is known as the second oldest community radio station in Akita Prefecture, airing on February 2, 1999.

== Transportation ==
=== Railway ===
East Japan Railway Company - Ōu Main Line

- Innai - Yokobori - Mitsuseki - Kami-Yuzawa - Yuzawa - Shimo-Yuzawa

=== Highway ===
- Tōhoku-Chūō Expressway
- Yuzawa-Yokote Road
- National Route 13
- National Route 108
- National Route 398

== Local attractions ==
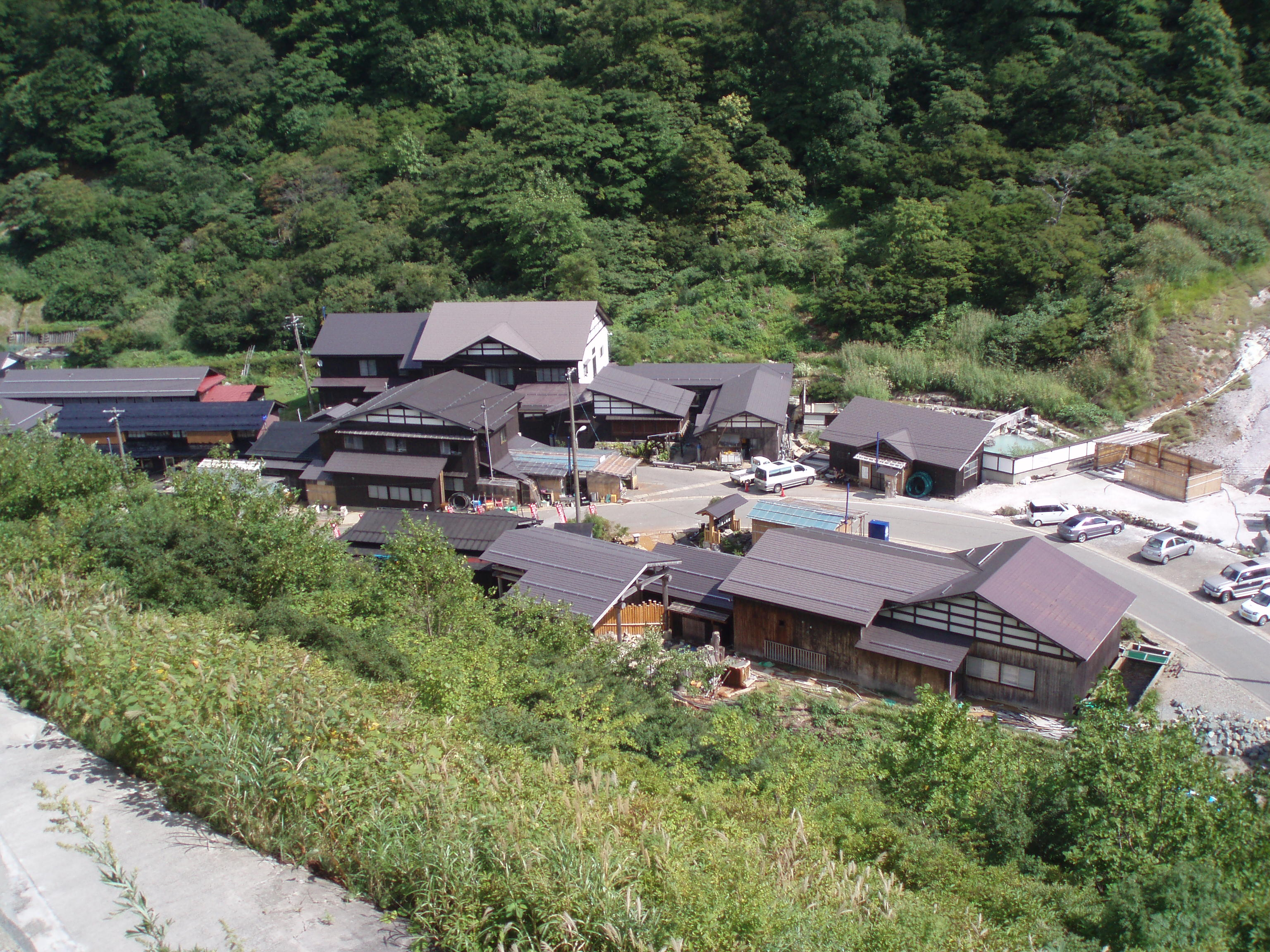
Doroyu Onsen

- Oyasu-kyo Onsen
- Doroyu Onsen
- Akinomiya Onsen
  - Takanoyu Onsen
- Kawarage Jigoku

== International relations ==
=== Sister cities ===
Yuzawa is twinned with:

- Csurgó, Hungary (1976)
- (Japan) Kushiro, Hokkaido (1987)
- Kulim, Malaysia (2003)

=== Other relations ===
Yuzawa carries out an exchange program for junior high school students with:

- Siegburg, Germany

== Noted people from Yuzawa ==
- Hiroe Kakizaki, basketball player
- Kiyokuni Katsuo, sumo wrestler
- Terukuni Manzō, sumo wrestler
- Ryuzo Sato, economist
- Kantarō Suga, actor
- Yoshihide Suga, former Prime Minister (2020–2021)
