= Yokobori =

Yokobori may refer to:

== Surname ==
- Jenny Yokobori (born 1997), American voice actress
- Miki Yokobori (born 1975), Japanese former professional tennis player

== Places ==
- Yokobori Station, railway station in Japan
