= Takanoyu Onsen =

Hot spring in Akita Prefecture, Japan

Takanoyu Onsen 鷹の湯温泉
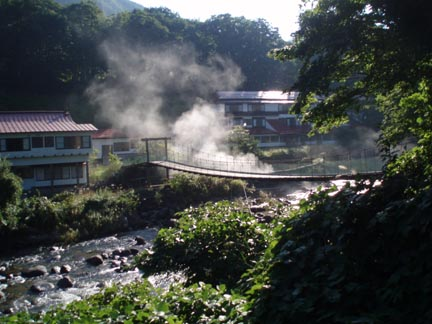
- Takanoyu Onsen and steam rising from the hot spring

- Location within Akita Prefecture Location within Japan
- Interactive map of Takanoyu Onsen 鷹の湯温泉
- Location: Yuzawa, Akita, Japan
- Coordinates: 38°57′28″N 140°32′16″E
- Type: saline
- Discharge: 9000 liters/min
- Temperature: 72.0 deg C

Takanoyu Onsen (鷹の湯温泉) is one of several hot springs in the Akinomiya Hot Springs area of the city of Yuzawa, in southern Akita Prefecture. The onsen is nestled in a small gorge along the banks of the Yakunai River. Because of its secluded location, it is referred to as a Hitou, or hidden hot spring.

== History ==
Legend has it that the Akinomiya Hot Springs, the oldest in Akita Prefecture, were found 1,200 years ago. Local legend also has it that Takanoyu, or Falcon's Hot Spring, got its name when a falcon led a hunter to the spring, giving the onsen its eponymous name. The onsens in Akinomiya were officially recognized by the Akita Clan in the Edo period (1603–1868).

== Water quality ==
The various hot springs in the immediate area are referred to as the Akinomiya Geothermal Area and are situated along the western base of Mount Kurikoma.

Takanoyu Onsen has its own hot spring, which emerges on the east bank of the Yakunai River. The water temperature at the spring source is 72 °C (162 °F). Only about ten percent of all hot spring facilities in Japan have water flowing directly from their own pure source. Its medicinal benefits are recommended for neuralgia, rheumatism, and skin disorders.

== Baths ==
Takanoyu has indoor baths, or ofuro (お風呂), outdoor baths, or rotenburo (露天風呂), and a foot bath, or ashiyu (足湯). There are three, mixed bathing indoor baths of varying temperature, one of which a person can soak standing up in water 130 cm deep, and a women's bath. There are three mixed bathing rotenburo, one of which is located on the bank of the Yakunai River, and a women's rotenburo.

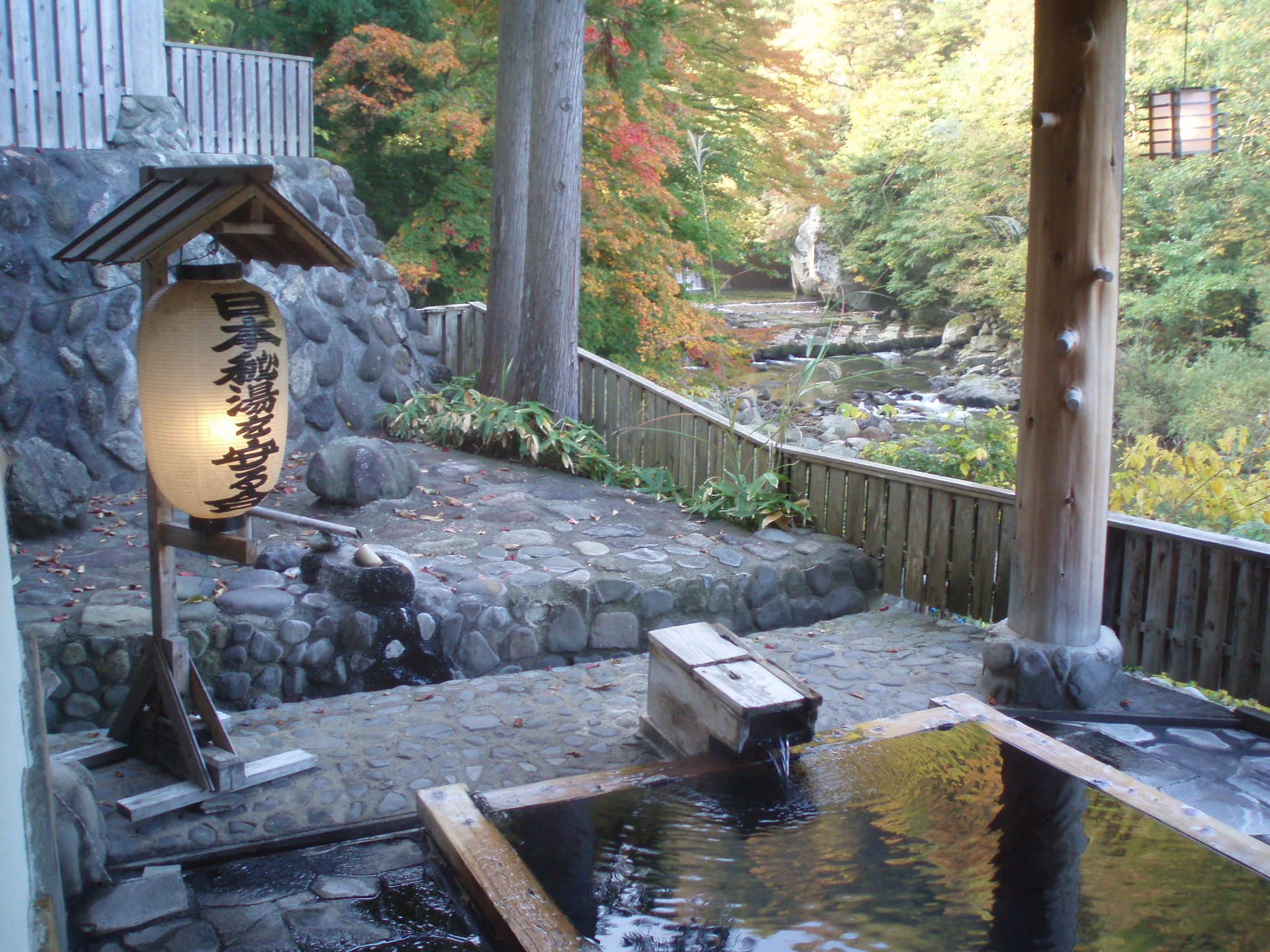
Rotenburo

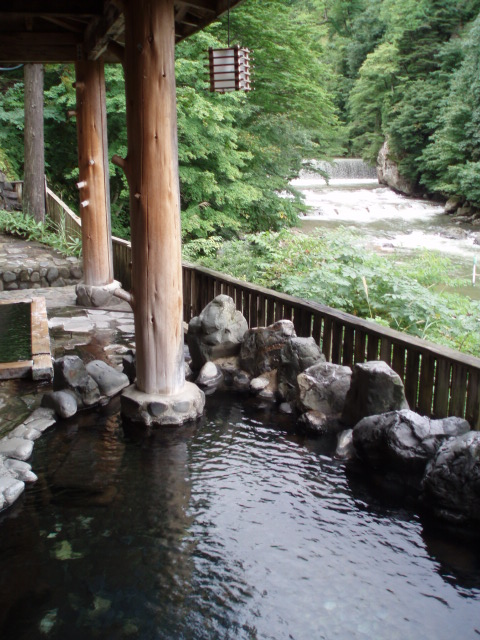
Rotenburo

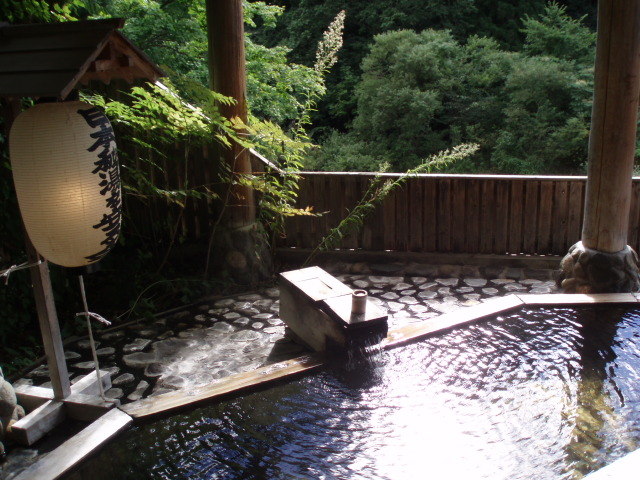
Women's Rotenburo

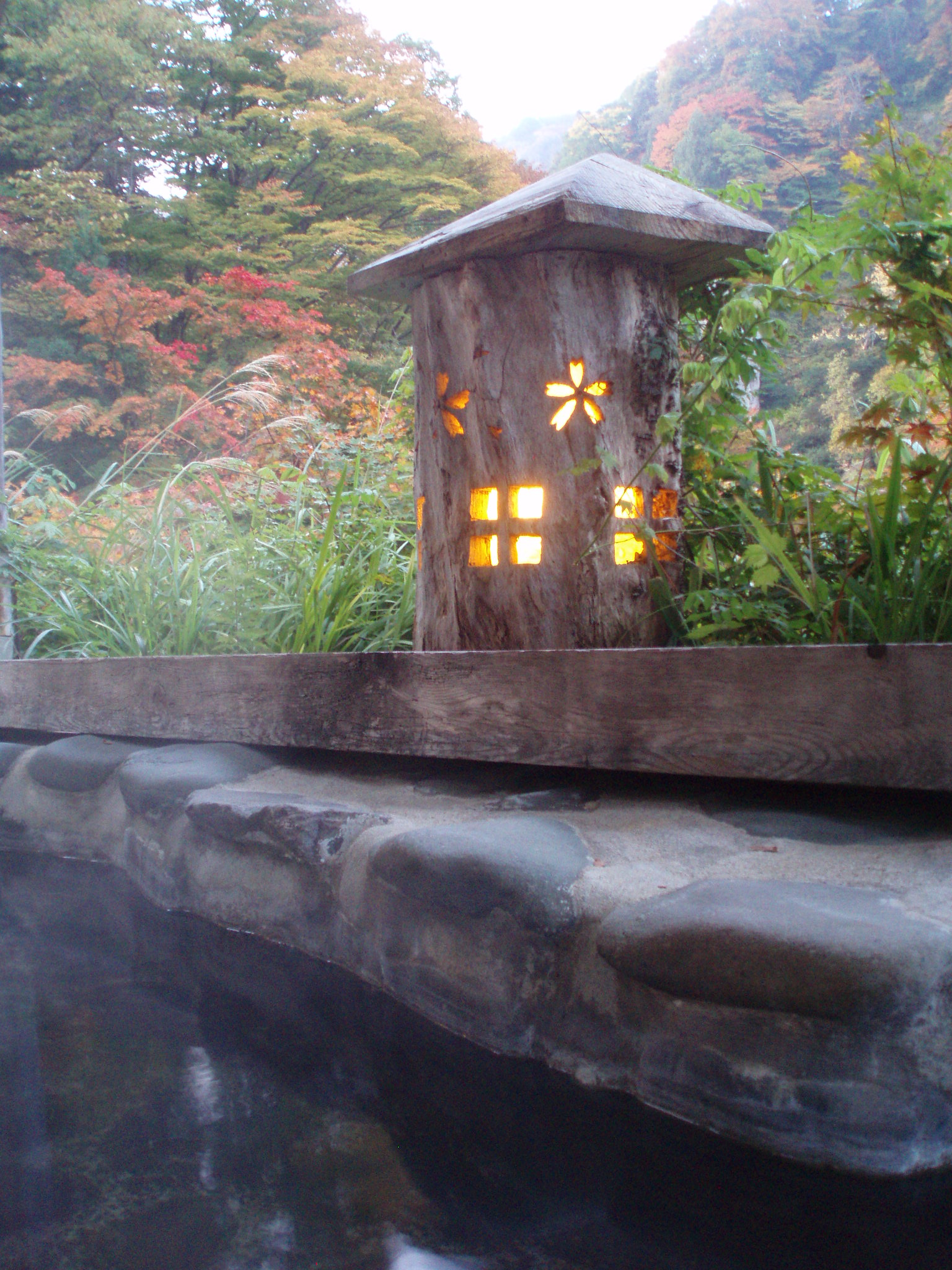
Ashiyu

== Onsen culture ==
Besides soaking in a spring fed ofuro, onsen provide an opportunity to experience traditional Japanese culture, including the Japanese love of nature. Many hot springs are located in rural mountainous areas. In Akita Prefecture, the inns typically serve sansai, or local wild vegetables, wild and cultivated mushrooms, and grilled mountain stream trout for dinner, and onsen tamago for breakfast.

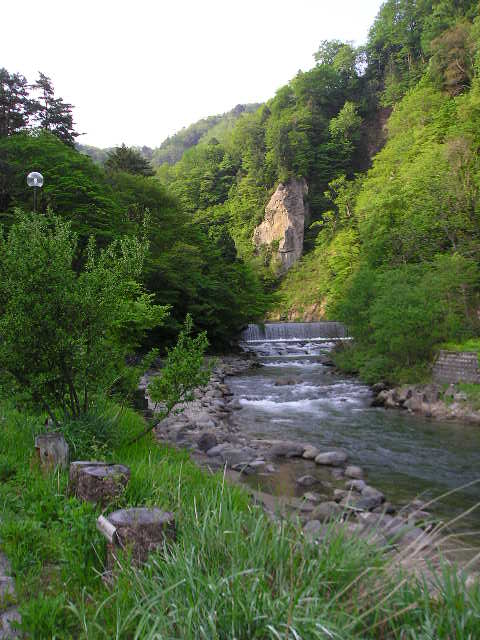
Spring Foliage

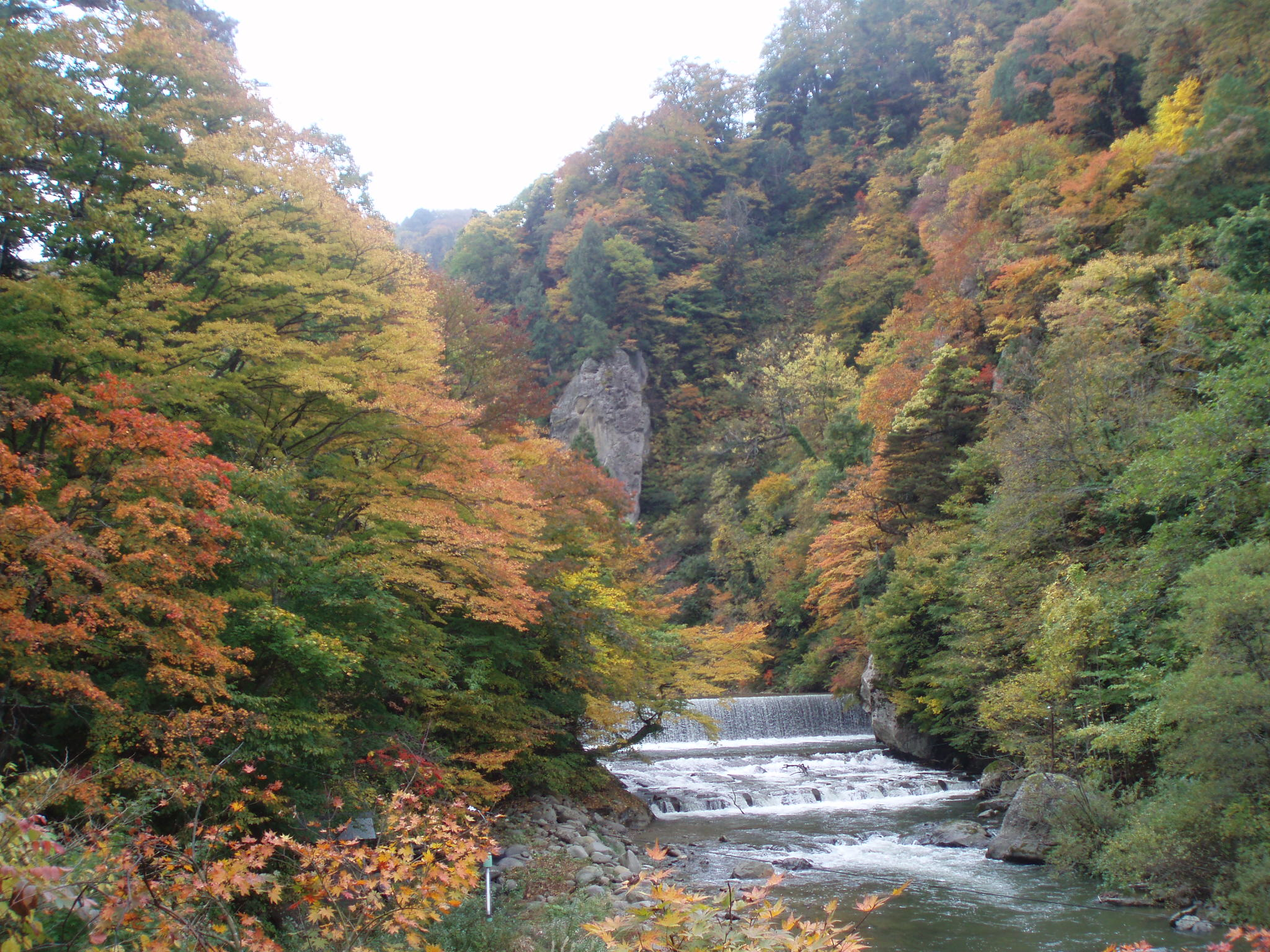
Fall Foliage

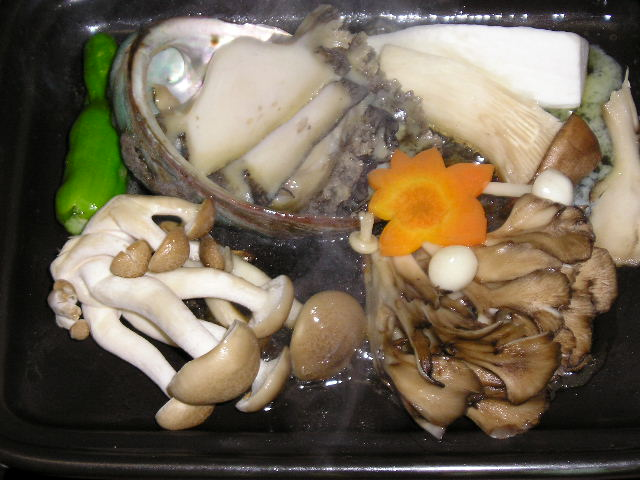
Food: Cooked Wild Mushrooms

== Transportation ==
Akinomiya is located on highway route 108 approximately 30 minutes by car south from Yokobori, Akita, or 45 minutes by car north from Naruko, Miyagi.

Akinomiya and southern Akita Prefecture are also accessible by rail. Yokobori Station is served by the JR East Ōu Main Line serving Aomori, Akita, Yamagata, and Fukushima Prefectures. From Tokyo, southern Akita is served by the Tohoku Shinkansen (Furukawa Station) or the Yamagata Shinkansen (Shinjo Station).
