= Onodera Shigemichi =

- 小野寺茂道
- Born: Before 1566 (Note: While Shigemichi's exact birth date is unknown, he was older than his brother Onodera Yoshimichi, who was born in 1566.)
- Died: 1601(?); Nishimonai or Shōnai, Japan
- Relatives: Three sons (Ichimasa, Magorokurou, Norimichi), two daughters
- Military career
- Allegiance: Onodera clan
- Service years: ?–1601
- Rank: Keeper of Nishimonai Castle
- Conflicts: Onodera–Mogami conflict

Onodera Shigemichi (Note: He should not be confused with the nobleman of the same name who lived in the 12th century.) (小野寺茂道, died in or after 1601) was a samurai commander, keeper of Nishimonai Castle and half-brother of the regional lord (daimyō) Onodera Yoshimichi. Famous for his last stand against the Mogami clan, Shigemichi is still honored in Nishimonai as part of an annual bon dance.

== Biography ==
=== Service to his family ===
Shigemichi was born sometime before 1566 as the illegitimate son of Onodera Terumichi, the head of the Onodera clan and daimyō of a relatively small domain in Dewa Province, specifically the part that later became southern Akita Prefecture. Though the Onodera clan was deeply entrenched in its territory and had an experienced and loyal army, it was constantly beset by more powerful rival families, most importantly the Mogami clan, that wanted to take control of the Onodera lands. Thus growing up in a time of constant warfare, Shigemichi went on to serve as samurai for his family and fought in many battles, earning a martial reputation. After his father's death, Shigemichi did not succeed him as daimyō due to his illegitimacy. Instead, his younger brother Onodera Yoshimichi became the next family head, and Shigemichi loyally served him. He was appointed the keeper of Nishimonai Castle, which was a strategically significant and highly contested stronghold that controlled the Onodera clan's southern holdings.

Even though the Onodera had managed to defeat or at least stall numerous invasions by outsiders over time, their position finally became untenable in 1600. In the war for the control over Japan between the forces loyal to Tokugawa Ieyasu and Toyotomi Hideyori, Onodera Yoshimichi had chosen to side with the latter. The other lords in the Akita region instead pledged allegiance to the Tokugawa cause. Toyotomi Hideyori's followers were decisively defeated at Sekigahara, but Yoshimichi refused to give up. This provided the Mogami, who had sided with Tokugawa Ieyasu, with the chance to subjugate the now isolated Onodera. They invaded with a large army in late 1600 and quickly overran the Onodera, forcing Yoshimichi to surrender, whereupon he was exiled.

=== Last stand at Nishimonai and legacy ===
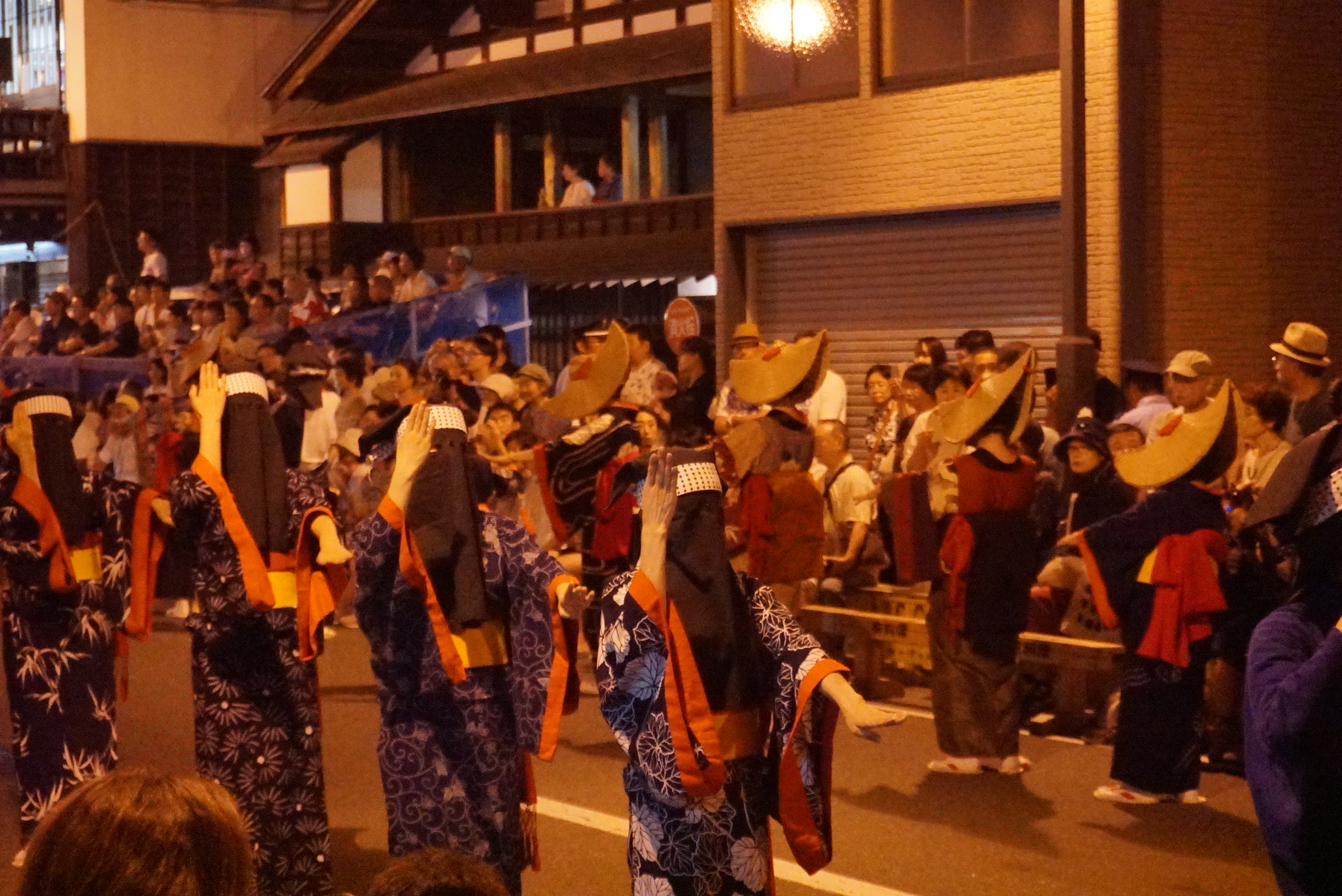
The Nishimonai bon dance (pictured 2019) in honor of Onodera Shigemichi became a local tradition.

At this point, all Onodera resistance in Akita was effectively broken – with the notable exception of Shigemichi, who still held Nishimonai. Upon hearing of his brother's defeat, he refused to surrender and abandon his position. When the Mogami army thus arrived at Nishimonai Castle in early 1601, two months after Yoshimichi's surrender and exile, they found it barred against them and held by Shigemichi's defiant followers. The Mogami under general Sakenobe Norikatsu promptly launched an assault, during which sixty of their samurai and numerous Onodera soldiers were killed. As the castle was about to fall, Shigemichi set fire to it. His fate after this point is disputed; according to some accounts, he perished in the flames of his castle, while others report that he managed to escape to Shōnai, where he died.

In either case, when his surviving followers in the area around Nishimonai learned of his death, they decided to do "an unusual thing in his memory; they danced". In this way, they wanted to honor their dead commander and appease his spirit. The bon dance for Onodera Shigemichi became a local tradition, expanded in its scope, and eventually merged with another regional dance that was performed annually to pray for a good harvest. In this latest incarnation, the dance is still performed every year to this day.
