= FM Yutopia =

JOZZ2AN-FM
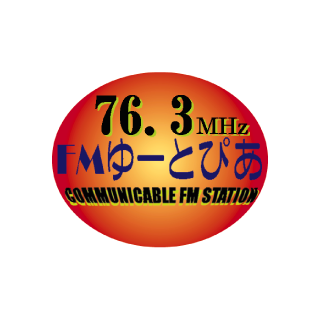

Yuzawa, Akita, Japan; Japan
- Broadcast area: Yuzawa, Akita, Ugo, Akita
- Frequency: 76.3MHz
- Branding: FM Yutopia

Programming
- Language: Japanese
- Format: Music/Talk

Ownership
- Owner: Marushin Takaku Construction

History
- First air date: February 21, 1999

Technical information
- Power: 20W
- Transmitter coordinates: 39°10′09.1″N 140°30′28.1″E

Links
- Webcast: http://www.simulradio.info/asx/FmYutopia.asx
- Website: Official website

FM Yutopia Co., Ltd. (株式会社エフエムゆーとぴあ, Kabushiki-gaisha FM Yutopia) is a Japanese FM station based in Yuzawa, Akita, Japan.

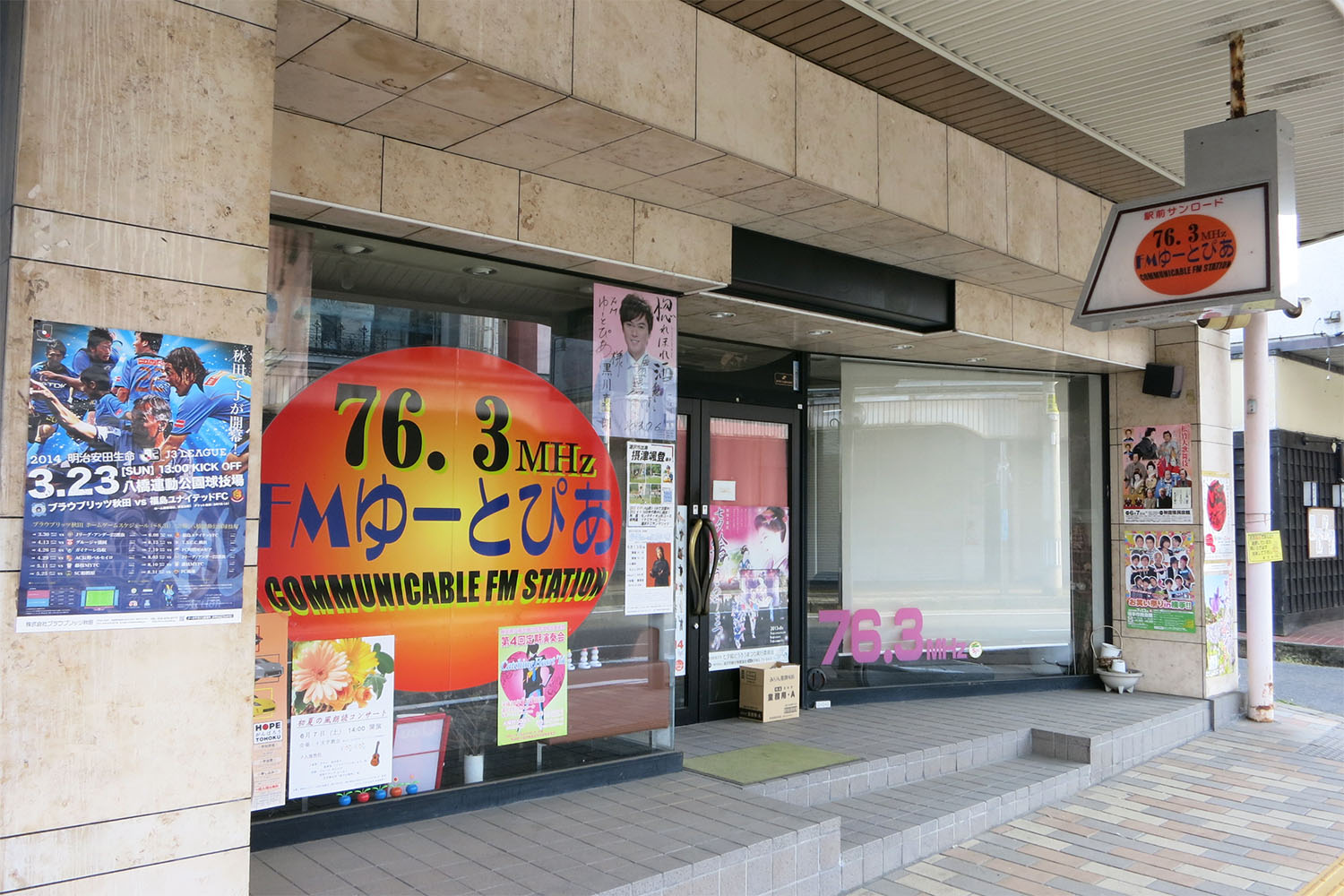
