= Mitsuseki Station =

Railway station in Yuzawa, Akita Prefecture, Japan

Mitsuseki Station 三関駅
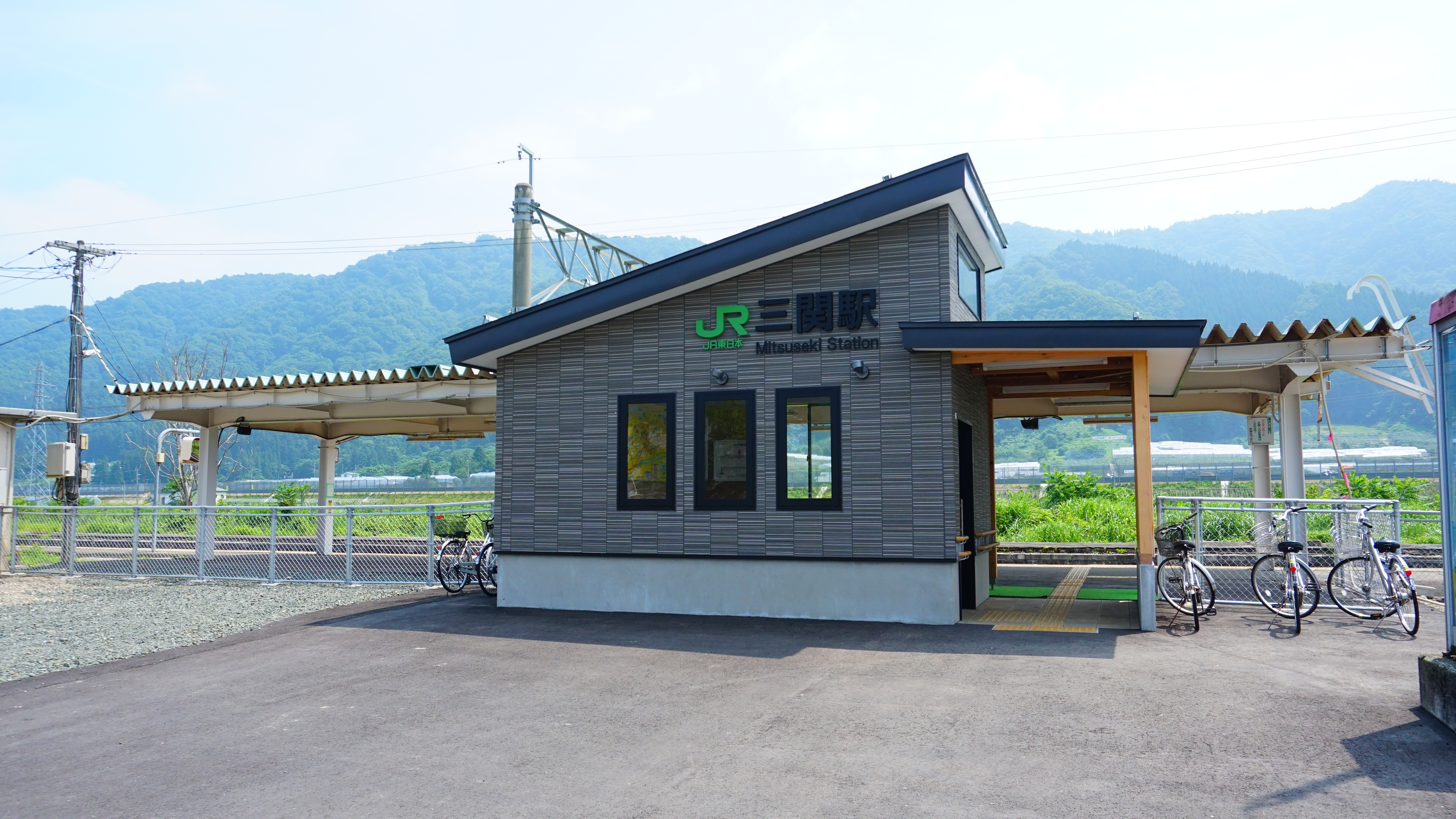
- Mitsuseki Station in July 2018

General information
- Location: 5 Futatsubashi, Kamiseki, Yuzawa-shi, Akita-ken 012-0864; Japan
- Coordinates: 39°6′36.7″N 140°29′0.9″E
- Operator: JR East
- Line: ■ Ōu Main Line
- Distance: 204.4 km from Fukushima
- Platforms: 1 side platform
- Tracks: 1

Other information
- Website: Official website

History
- Opened: 5 November 1923
- Rebuilt: 2017

Passengers
- FY2007: 40 daily

Services
Preceding station	JR East	Following station
Yokobori towards Shinjō	Ōu Main Line Local	Kami-Yuzawa towards Aomori
Location
- Location within Akita Prefecture Location within Japan

Mitsuseki Station (三関駅, Mitsuseki-eki) is a railway station on the Ōu Main Line in Yuzawa, Akita Prefecture, Japan, operated by East Japan Railway Company (JR East).

== Lines ==
Mitsuseki Station is served by the Ōu Main Line, and is located 204.4 km (127.0 mi) from the starting point of the line at Fukushima Station.

== Station layout ==
The station has one side platform serving a single bi-directional line. The station is unattended.

== History ==
Mitsuseki Station opened on July 1, 1930. The station has been unattended since December 1979. The station was absorbed into the JR East network upon the privatization of Japanese National Railways (JNR) on April 1, 1987.

The station building was replaced by a temporary structure in August 2017, with a new building completed in December 2017.

== Passenger statistics ==
In fiscal 2007 (the last year for which data was published), the station was used by an average of 40 passengers daily (boarding passengers only). The passenger figures for previous years are as shown below.

Fiscal year	Daily average
2000	81
2005	49
2007	40

== Surrounding area ==
- National Route 13
- Omono River

== See also ==
- List of railway stations in Japan
