= Akinomiya Hot Springs =

Thermal spring system in Akita Prefecture

- Aki no Miya Onsenkyo
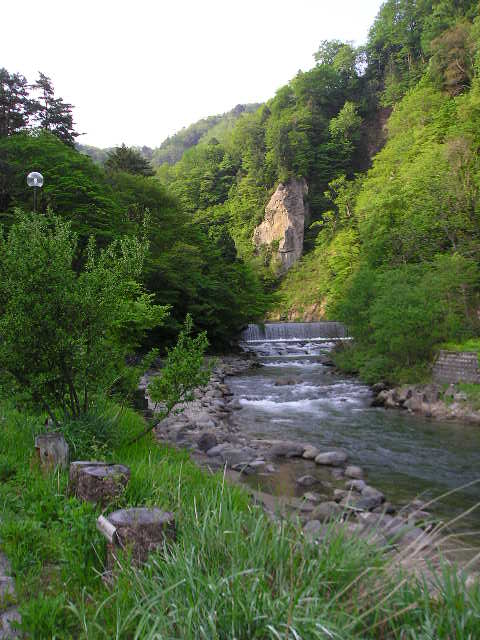
- Kawara-no-Yukko (Riverbed Onsen) soaking pool at the Yakunai River in Akinomiya Onsenkyo.

- Location within Akita Prefecture Location within Japan
- Coordinates: 38°57′36″N 140°32′25″E
- Type: geothermal
- Temperature: 162 °F (72 °C)

The Akinomiya Hot Springs also known as Aki no Miya Onsenkyo is a thermal spring system and hot springs village in the Akinomiya Geothermal Area located along the western base of Mount Kurikoma in Akita Prefecture, Japan, (formerly Dewa Province, and after the Meiji era, Ugo Province). There are more than 50 hot springs and fumaroles in the area.

According to legend, the hot springs are the oldest in the prefecture. They were established 1,200 years ago. The onsen at Akinomiya were officially recognized in the Edo period (1603-1868) by the Akita Clan.

Some of the well known springs within the system include Inazumi, Takanoyu, Yunodai, Yunomata, among others found along the Yakunai River. Takanoyu Onsen is one of the better known hot springs of the Akinomiya Hot Springs region. The footbaths, Kawara-no-Yukko (Riverbed Onsen), are accessed by digging among the river stones with a shovel to form shallow soaking pools.

There have been geothermal energy developments such as power plants within the area. Approximately 70% of the residential households draw their hot water from the springs.

The springs were written about by the Japanese novelist, poet and philosopher Saneatsu Mushanokoji among others.

The spring water emerges from the source at 162°F / 72°C.

== Location and transportation ==
The Akinomiya Onsen area is located on highway route 108. By car from Yokobori, Akita, it is a 30 minute drive south. Akinomiya is served by the Yokobori Station via the JR East Ōu Main Line serving Akita prefecture. High speed rail service from Tokyo serves the southern Akita area via the Yamagata Shinkansen Shinjo Station or the Tohoku Shinkansen Furukawa Station.

== Climate ==
Climate data for Akinomiya (1991−2020 normals, extremes 1976−present)
Month	Jan	Feb	Mar	Apr	May	Jun	Jul	Aug	Sep	Oct	Nov	Dec	Year
Record high °C (°F)	11.6 (52.9)	16.1 (61.0)	17.4 (63.3)	27.6 (81.7)	31.2 (88.2)	31.4 (88.5)	35.3 (95.5)	35.1 (95.2)	32.4 (90.3)	27.9 (82.2)	22.9 (73.2)	17.3 (63.1)	35.3 (95.5)
Mean daily maximum °C (°F)	0.4 (32.7)	1.3 (34.3)	5.2 (41.4)	12.3 (54.1)	19.0 (66.2)	22.7 (72.9)	25.9 (78.6)	27.3 (81.1)	22.9 (73.2)	16.7 (62.1)	10.0 (50.0)	3.2 (37.8)	13.9 (57.0)
Daily mean °C (°F)	−2.2 (28.0)	−1.9 (28.6)	1.0 (33.8)	6.7 (44.1)	13.3 (55.9)	17.6 (63.7)	21.3 (70.3)	22.3 (72.1)	18.2 (64.8)	11.9 (53.4)	5.7 (42.3)	0.2 (32.4)	9.5 (49.1)
Mean daily minimum °C (°F)	−5.0 (23.0)	−5.0 (23.0)	−2.6 (27.3)	1.8 (35.2)	7.9 (46.2)	13.0 (55.4)	17.6 (63.7)	18.6 (65.5)	14.4 (57.9)	7.8 (46.0)	1.9 (35.4)	−2.4 (27.7)	5.7 (42.2)
Record low °C (°F)	−15.5 (4.1)	−15.3 (4.5)	−11.5 (11.3)	−7.4 (18.7)	−0.8 (30.6)	3.9 (39.0)	8.4 (47.1)	9.8 (49.6)	2.3 (36.1)	−1.0 (30.2)	−6.2 (20.8)	−12.1 (10.2)	−15.5 (4.1)
Average precipitation mm (inches)	197.8 (7.79)	135.8 (5.35)	142.5 (5.61)	124.2 (4.89)	128.6 (5.06)	139.9 (5.51)	237.5 (9.35)	210.2 (8.28)	179.4 (7.06)	177.7 (7.00)	201.4 (7.93)	229.2 (9.02)	2,104.2 (82.84)
Average snowfall cm (inches)	295 (116)	213 (84)	152 (60)	28 (11)	0 (0)	0 (0)	0 (0)	0 (0)	0 (0)	0 (0)	26 (10)	198 (78)	913 (359)
Average precipitation days (≥ 1.0 mm)	24.8	20.7	19.0	14.6	12.9	12.0	14.7	13.4	13.9	14.7	18.8	23.9	203.4
Average snowy days (≥ 3 cm)	23.0	19.0	16.9	4.1	0	0	0	0	0	0	2.5	15.0	80.5
Mean monthly sunshine hours	22.5	41.3	93.7	148.1	183.7	160.2	133.9	164.7	127.1	116.9	75.5	33.9	1,301.7
Source: Japan Meteorological Agency

== See also ==
- List of hot springs in Japan
- List of hot springs in the world
