= Ugo, Akita =

Ugo 羽後町
- Town
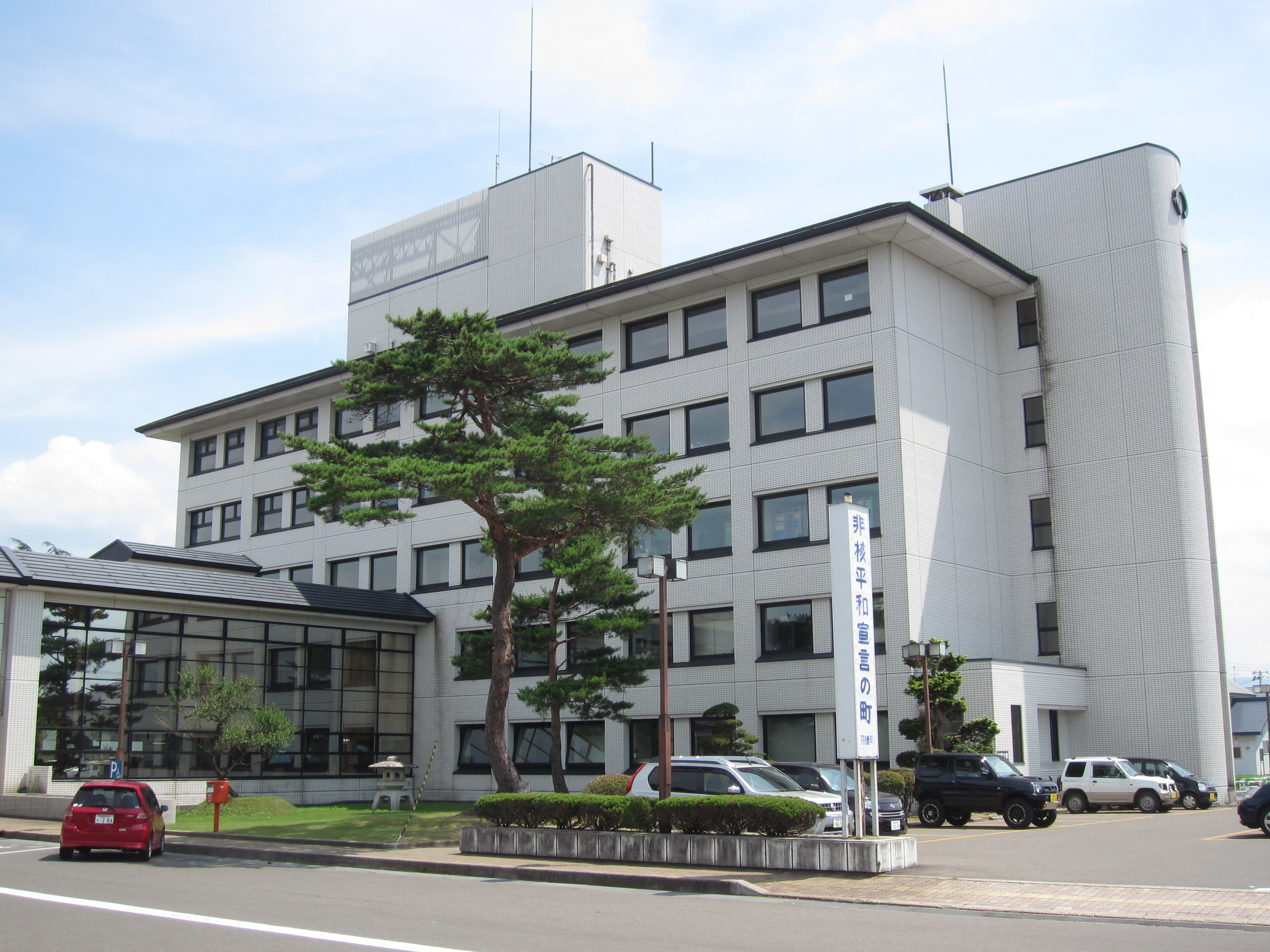
- Ugo Town Hall

- Flag Seal
- Location of Ugo in Akita Prefecture

- Coordinates: 39°11′53″N 140°24′46″E
- Country: Japan
- Region: Tōhoku
- Prefecture: Akita
- District: Ogachi

Government
  - -Mayor: Yutaka Ando

Area
  - Total: 230.78 km^{2} (89.10 sq mi)

Population (February 28, 2023)
  - Total: 13,594
  - Density: 58.905/km^{2} (152.56/sq mi)
- Time zone: UTC+9 (Japan Standard Time)
- Phone number: 0183-62-2111
- Address: 177 Azanakano, Nishimonai, Ugo-machi, Ogachi-gun, Akita 012-1131
- Website: Official website
- Symbols
- Bird: Japanese bush warbler
- Flower: Pheasant's eye (Adonis ramosa)
- Tree: Japanese apricot

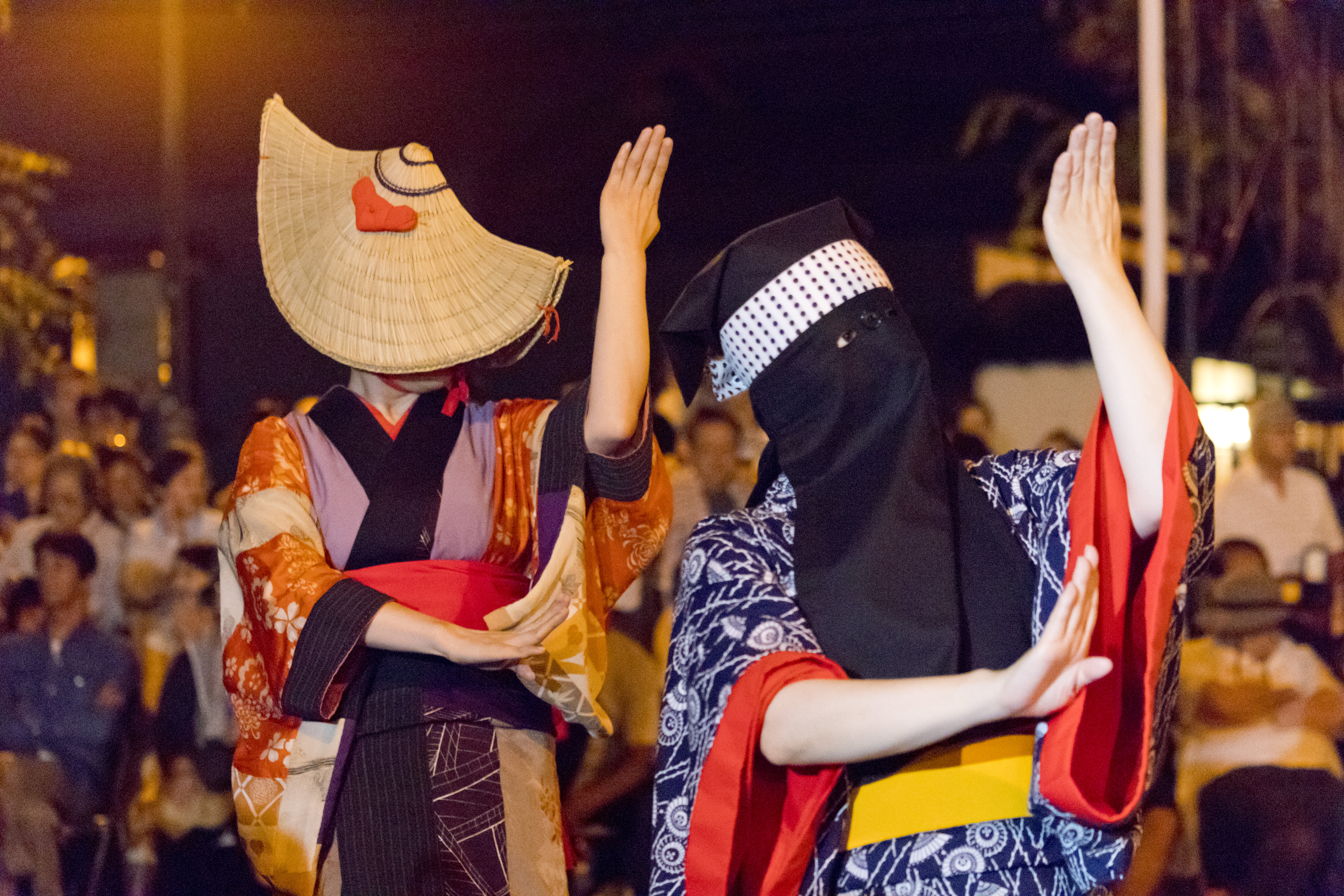
Nishimonai Bon Odori

Ugo (羽後町, Ugo-machi) is a town located in Akita Prefecture, Japan. As of 28 February 2023, the town had an estimated population of 13,594 in 5141 households, and a population density of 59 persons per km^{2}. The total area of the town is 230.78 square kilometres (89.10 sq mi).

== Geography ==
Ugo is located in southern Akita Prefecture, on the Ogachi Plain (雄勝平野, Ogachi heiya), which is bordered by the Dewa Mountains (出羽山脈, Dewa sanmyaku) to the west, and the Ōu Mountains (奥羽山脈, Ōu sanmyaku) to the east. It is one of the prefecture's heaviest snowfall areas, and the amount of snow accumulated often exceeds 2 meters.

=== Neighboring municipalities ===
Akita Prefecture

- Yokote
- Yurihonjō
- Yuzawa

== Areas ==
Ugo is divided into seven distinct areas:

- Nishimonai (西馬音内) is the hub of the town and home to most of the residents. Nishimonai is also home to the majority of restaurants, shops, drinking establishments, and some small parks. Every August the town's Bon Odori is held in Nishimonai.
- Miwa (三輪) is the second-largest district in Ugo and home to Miwa Suga shrine, the oldest and most important shrine in town.
- Motonishi (元西) is a residential area.
- Niinari (新成), Meiji (明治), Sendō (仙道), and Tashiro (田代) are residential and farming areas with some secluded shrines and temples.

== Climate ==
Ugo has a humid continental climate (Köppen climate classification Dfa) with large seasonal temperature differences, with warm to hot (and often humid) summers and cold (sometimes severely cold) winters. Precipitation is significant throughout the year, but is heaviest from August to October. Ugo is noted for its heavy snows with accumulated snow exceeding two meters in most winters. The average annual temperature in Ugo is 9.4 °C. The average annual rainfall is 1800 mm with September as the wettest month. The temperatures are highest on average in August, at around 23.5 °C, and lowest in January, at around -3.1 °C.

== Demographics ==
Per Japanese census data, the population of Ugo has been in steady decline for the past 70 years.

Historical population
Year	Pop.	±%
1950	28,815	—
1960	27,716	−3.8%
1970	23,604	−14.8%
1980	21,399	−9.3%
1990	20,906	−2.3%
2000	19,485	−6.8%
2010	16,794	−13.8%
2020	13,825	−17.7%

== History ==
The area of present-day Ugo was part of ancient Ugo Province, dominated by the Satake clan during the Edo period, who ruled Kubota Domain under the Tokugawa shogunate. The village of Nishimonai was established within Ogachi District with the establishment of the modern municipalities system on April 1, 1889. It was raised to town status on July 6, 1897. The town of Ugo was established on April 1, 1955, by the merger of the town of Nishimonai with the surrounding villages of Miwa, Niinari, Meiji Motonishimonai, Tashiro, and Sendo, all from Ogachi District.

== Government ==
Ugo has a mayor-council form of government with a directly elected mayor and a unicameral town legislature of 17 members. The town (together with Yuzawa and the village of Higashinaruse) contributes three members to the Akita Prefectural Assembly. In terms of national politics, the town is part of Akita 3rd district of the lower house of the Diet of Japan.

== Economy ==
The economy of Ugo is based on agriculture, primarily rice cultivation, with the local Akita Komachi being nationally famous. Livestock farming, represented by Japanese black beef, is also important to the economy.

Ugo is location of the OTC (Orient Technical Center). It is a factory of luxury watches. OTC owned by Orient Watch Co., Ltd.

== Education ==
Ugo has four public elementary schools and one public middle school operated by the town government, and one public high school operated by the Akita Prefectural Board of Education.

- Elementary Schools
  - Miwa Elementary School (三輪小学校)
  - Nishimonai Elementary School (西馬音内小学校)
  - Takase Elementary School (高瀬小学校)
  - Ugo Meisei Elementary School (羽後明成小学校)
- Junior High Schools
  - Ugo Junior High School (羽後中学校)
- High Schools
  - Akita Prefectural Ugo High School (秋田県立羽後高等学校)

== Transportation ==
=== Railway ===
Ugo does not have any railway services. The nearest train station is Yuzawa Station on the JR East Ōu Main Line.

=== Highway ===
- National Route 398

== Places of worship ==
- Miwa Suga Shrine (三輪須賀神社, -jinja): Oldest and most important Shinto shrine in Ugo. The main building of this shrine was built in the Muromachi era with several others having been added over the following 400 years. Like most shrines in Ugo this shrine is surrounded by many cedar trees.
- Nishimonai Ontake Shrine (西馬音内御嶽神社, -jinja): Located next to the Nishimonai post office, this is Nishimonai's main shrine. It is located in the center of a stand of tall cedars.
- Taiheisan Shrine (太平山神社, -jinja): A 15-minute car ride and a 25-minute hike over a well worn mountain trail with many wooden stairs will bring you to the shrine at the top of Ugo's tiny Mt. Taihei. The shrine provides a sweeping view of southern Akita from Yuzawa all the way to Daisen. Especially recommended in fall.

== Local attractions ==
- Gorinzaka (五輪坂): A park complex Located in Nishimonai and Niinari. There is a small golf course with driving range (which doubles as a ski slope in the winter), picnic areas, a pond, and the Toshitoland spa and restaurant building.
- Nanamagari Pass (七曲峠, Nanamagari-tōge): A windy mountain path that leads over the branch of the Dewa mountains that cuts across the western third of Ugo. It leads from Motonishi into Tashiro, and is a popular challenge for cyclists. There are areas to stop and take in the natural environment as well as the local spring water known for extending life – chōmeisui (長命水).
- Suzuki House (鈴木家住宅, Suzukike-jūtaku): The oldest house in Akita prefecture. The main part of the house was built in the first half of the 17th century and the gate house being finished by 1733.

=== Nishimonai Bon Odori ===
The Nishimonai Bon Odori (西馬音内盆踊り) is held every year from August 16–18. It is a symbolic dance to show proper respect and gratefulness to one's deceased ancestors. It is ranked as one of the top 3 bon dances in Japan. It began as a harvest dance in Nishimonai in about 1280. In 1601 the lord of Nishimonai, Onodera Shigemichi, burned his castle after a defeat and the people danced among the ruins to remember their lord. These two dances were merged in the late 18th century to form the dance's last incarnation which (despite attempts to stop it in the early 20th century) continues to this day. It is the biggest festival of the year, drawing people from all over Tohoku, and the country at large.

The week before the festival all of the shops on the Bon Odori street open up and display traditional hanui (端縫) patchwork kimono, amigasa (あみがさ) hats and hikosa zukin (彦三頭巾) masks.

The shops and food stands open at around 5. The dance begins as the sun goes down and continues until about 11.

=== Yukitopia ===
The annual Yukitopia Festival (ゆきとぴあ七曲, Yukitopia nanamagari) takes place on the last Saturday and Sunday of January. A horse-drawn carriage follows set course through Nishimonai, Motonishi, and all the way up the Nana Magari mountain road, crossing into Tashiro. The road is lined with small lanterns made from snow.

== Noted people from Ugo ==
- Satō Nobuhiro, Meiji period political theorist
