= Shimo-Yuzawa Station =

Railway station in Yuzawa, Akita Prefecture, Japan

Shimo-Yuzawa Station 下湯沢駅
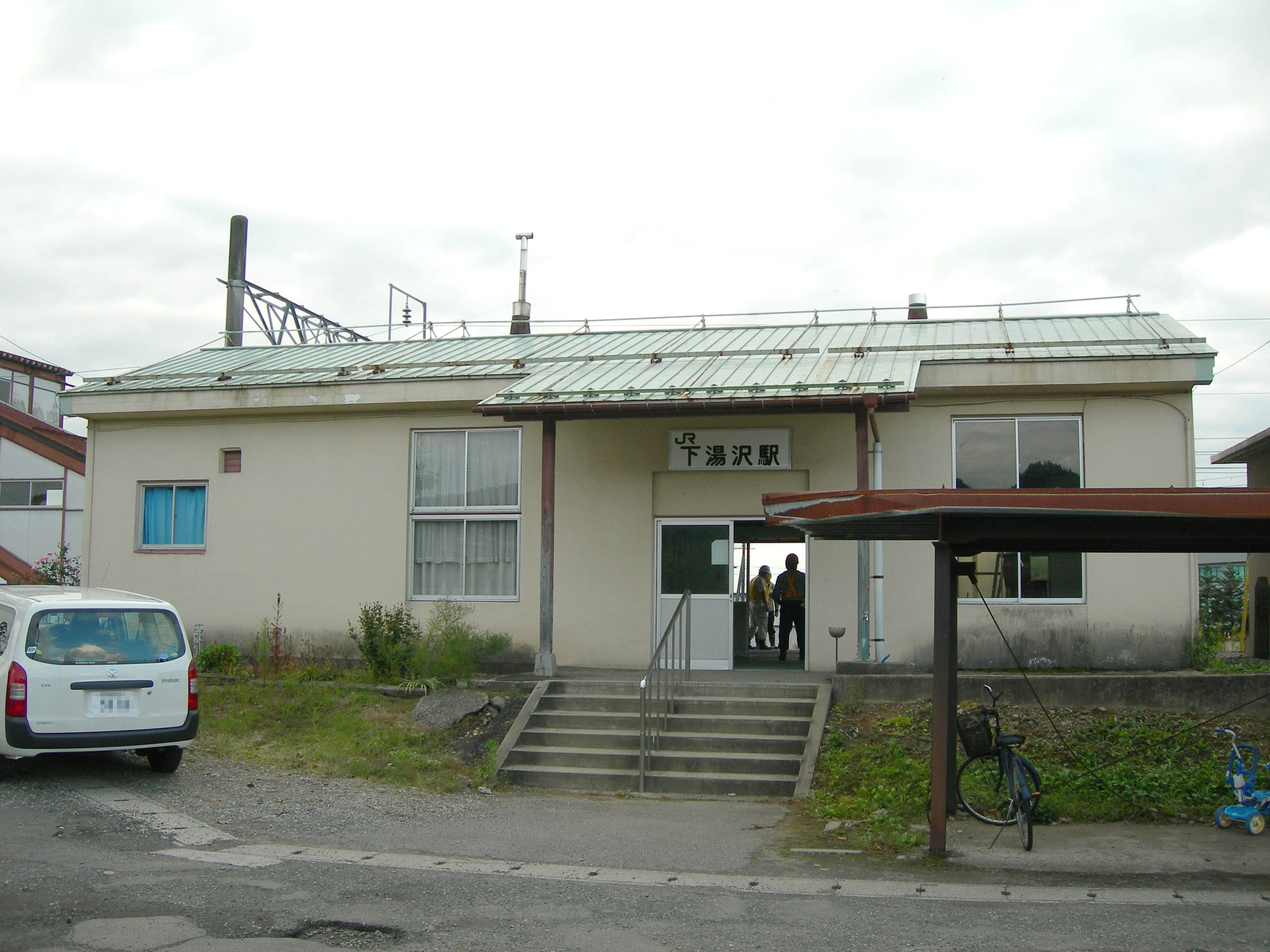
- Shimo-Yuzawa Station in October 2010

General information
- Location: Kamitsutsumi-105 Narisawa, Yuzawa-shi, Akita-ken 012-0802; Japan
- Coordinates: 39°11′53″N 140°30′11″E
- Operator: JR East
- Line: ■ Ōu Main Line
- Distance: 214.5 kilometers from Fukushima
- Platforms: 2 side platforms

Other information
- Status: Unstaffed
- Website: Official website

History
- Opened: November 28, 1956

Passengers
- FY2007: 50

Services
Preceding station	JR East	Following station
Yuzawa towards Shinjō	Ōu Main Line Local	Jūmonji towards Aomori
Location
- Location within Akita Prefecture Location within Japan

Shimo-Yuzawa Station (下湯沢駅, Shimo-Yuzawa-eki) is a railway station on the Ōu Main Line in the city of Yuzawa, Akita Prefecture, Japan, operated by JR East.

== Lines ==
Shimo-Yuzawa Station is served by the Ōu Main Line, and is located 214.5 km from the terminus of the line at Fukushima Station.

== Station layout ==
The station consists of two opposed side platforms connected to the station building by a footbridge. The station is unattended.

=== Platforms ===
1	■ Ōu Main Line	for Shinjō and Yamagata
2	■ Ōu Main Line	for Ōmagari and Akita

== History ==
Shimo-Yuzawa Station opened on November 28, 1956, as a station on the Japan National Railways (JNR). It has been unattended since December 1979. The station was absorbed into the JR East network upon the privatization of the JNR on April 1, 1987.

== Passenger statistics ==
In fiscal 2007, the last year for which published information is available, the station was used by an average of 50 passengers daily (boarding passengers only).

== Surrounding area ==
* Site of Iwasaki Castle

== See also ==
- List of railway stations in Japan
