= Ogachi, Akita =

Ogachi, Akita 雄勝町 (秋田県)
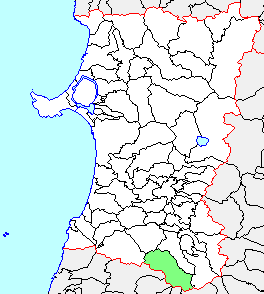

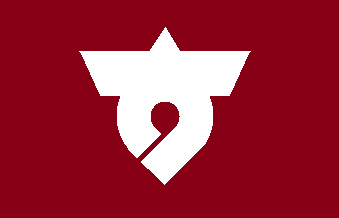
- Flag

- Location within Akita Prefecture Location within Japan
- Country: Japan
- Prefecture: Akita
- District: Ogachi

Area
  - Total: 306.02 km^{2} (118.15 sq mi)

Population (March 1, 2005)
  - Total: 8,935
  - Density: 29.20/km^{2} (75.62/sq mi)

Ogachi (雄勝町, Ogachi-machi) was a town located in Ogachi District, Akita Prefecture, Japan.

== Population ==
In 2003, the town had an estimated population of 9,041 and a density of 29.54 persons per km^{2}. The total area was 306.02 km^{2}.

== Merge ==
On March 22, 2005, Ogachi, along with the town of Inakawa, and the village of Minase (all from Ogachi District), merged into the expanded city of Yuzawa.

== Noted people from Ogachi ==
- Kiyokuni Katsuo, sumo wrestler
- Terukuni Manzō, sumo wrestler
- Yoshihide Suga, former Prime Minister (2020-2021)
