= Kami-Yuzawa Station =

Railway station in Yuzawa, Akita Prefecture, Japan

Kami-Yuzawa Station 上湯沢駅
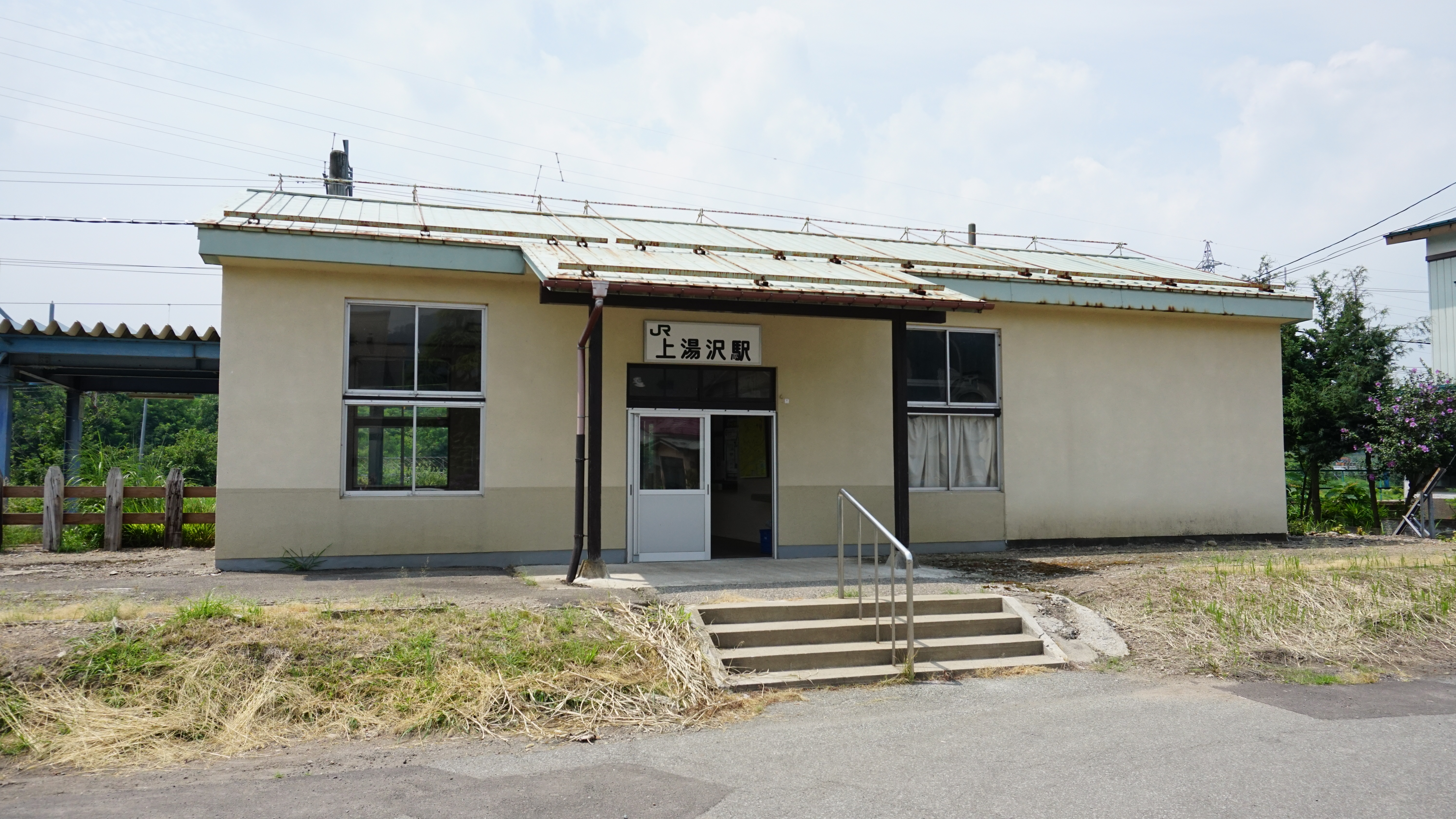
- Kami-Yuzawa Station, July 2018

General information
- Location: 88, Sekiguchi Hōryō Yuzawa-shi, Akita-ken 012-0862; Japan
- Coordinates: 39°8′3.47″N 140°29′7.08″E
- Operator: JR East
- Line: ■ Ōu Main Line
- Distance: 207.1 kilometers from Fukushima
- Platforms: 1 side island platform

Other information
- Status: Unstaffed
- Website: Official website

History
- Opened: November 28, 1956

Passengers
- FY2007: 41

Services
Preceding station	JR East	Following station
Mitsuseki towards Shinjō	Ōu Main Line Local	Yuzawa towards Aomori
Location
- Location within Akita Prefecture Location within Japan

Kami-Yuzawa Station (上湯沢駅, Kami-Yuzawa-eki) is a railway station on the Ōu Main Line in the city of Yuzawa, Akita Prefecture, Japan, operated by JR East.

== Lines ==
Kami-Yuzawa Station is served by the Ōu Main Line, and is located 207.1 km from the terminus of the line at Fukushima Station.

== Station layout ==
The station consists of one side platform serving a single bi-directional line. The station is unattended.

== History ==
Kami-Yuzawa Station opened on November 28, 1956, as a station on the Japan National Railways (JNR). It has been unattended since December 1979. The station was absorbed into the JR East network upon the privatization of the JNR on April 1, 1987.

== Passenger statistics ==
In fiscal 2007, the last year for which published statistics are available, the station was used by an average of 41 passengers daily (boarding passengers only).

== Surrounding area ==
The deeply wooded and remote area is known for its romantic attractions and hotels .

== See also ==
- List of railway stations in Japan
