= Inakawa, Akita =

Dissolved municipality in Akita prefecture, Japan

Inakawa (稲川町, Inakawa-machi) was a town located in Ogachi District, Akita Prefecture, Japan.

In 2003, the town had an estimated population of 10,365 and a density of 157.33 persons per km^{2}. The total area was 65.88 km^{2}.

On March 22, 2005, Inakawa, along with the town of Ogachi and the village of Minase (all from Ogachi District), merged into the expanded city of Yuzawa, so the town no longer exists.
