= 2005 Yuzawa mayoral election =

Yuzawa, Akita held a mayoral election on April 17, 2005 after the merger of two cities and a village. Suzuki Toshio won the election.

== Candidates ==
- Endou Kouji
- Nisaka Nobukuni
- Suga Yoshio
- Suzuki Toshio, former mayor and supported by the Japanese Communist Party.

== Results ==
Mayoral election 2005: Yuzawa City
Party	Candidate	Votes	%	±%
Independent, JCP	Suzuki Toshio	13,993		
Independent	Nisaka Nobukuni	10,334		
Independent	Endou Kouji	6,419		
Independent	Suga Yoshio	6,125		
Turnout		37,295	80.18 %	N/A
