= Minase, Akita =

Dissolved municipality in Akita prefecture, Japan

Minase (皆瀬村, Minase-mura) was a village located in Ogachi District, Akita Prefecture, Japan.

In 2003, the village had an estimated population of 2,874 and a density of 13.15 persons per km² (34.06 persons per square mile). The total area was 218.62 square kilometres (84.41 sq mi).

On March 22, 2005, Minase, along with the towns of Inakawa and Ogachi (all from Ogachi District), merged into the expanded city of Yuzawa.
