= Ogachi District, Akita =

District in Akita Prefecture, Japan

Coordinates: 39.181°N 140.404°E

Location of Ogachi District in Akita Prefecture

Ogachi District (雄勝郡, Ogachi-gun) is a rural district located in Akita Prefecture, Japan.

At present time, the district has an estimated population of 18,698 and an area of 434.32 km^{2}.

Currently, Ogachi District consists of a single town and single village.

== Towns and villages ==
- Higashinaruse
- Ugo

== History ==
The area of Ogachi Distinct was formerly part of Dewa Province, which was divided into the provinces of Ugo Province and Uzen Province following the Meiji restoration on January 19, 1869, with the area of Ogachi becoming part of Ugo Province. At the time, the area consisted of two towns and 53 villages formerly under the control of Kubota Domain and 33 villages formerly under the control of Iwasaki Domain, with one village formerly shared between the two domains. Akita Prefecture was founded on December 13, 1871.

With the establishment of the municipality system on December 23, 1878, Ogachi District, with two towns (Yuzawa and Iwasaki) and 23 villages was established.

- July 19, 1895 - Yokobori and Innai were elevated to town status.
- July 6, 1897 - Nishimonai was elevated to town status.
- June 4, 1902 - Inaniwa was elevated to town status.
- March 22, 1933 - Kawatsura was elevated to town status.
- March 31, 1954 - The city of Yuzawa was established by absorbing the former towns of Yuzawa and Iwasaki.
- April 1, 1955 - The town of Ugo was established.
- April 15, 1955 - The town of Ogachi was established by absorbing the towns of Yokobori and Innai.
- September 30, 1955 - The towns of Inaniwa and Kawataura were merged to create the town of Inakawa
- On March 22, 2005 - The towns of Inakawa and Ogachi, and village of Minase were merged into the expanded city of Yuzawa.

Following this merger the total area of the district became 434.32 km^{2}, and Ogachi District was left with only the town of Ugo, and village of Higashinaruse.

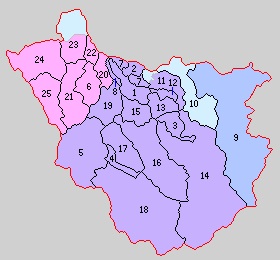
Historic Ogachi District purple - Yuzawa-shi: 1. Yuzawa; 2. Iwasaki; 3. Inaniwa; 4. Yokobori; 5. Innai; 7. Benten; 8. Itano; 11. Komagata (southeast portion; most); 12. Kawatsura; 13. Minashi; 14. Minase; 15. Mitsuseki; 16. Sukawa; 17. Ono; 18. Akinomiya; 19. Yamada; Blue - Higashinaruse-mura: 9. Higashinaruse; Pink - Ugo-machi: 6. Nishimonai; 20. Miwa; 21. Moto-Nishimonai; 22. Niinari; 23. Meiji (southern portion); 24. Tashiro; 25. Sendo; Light Blue - to others: 10. Nishinaruse (now part of Yokote-shi); 11. Komagata (northwest portion now part of Yokote-shi); 23. Meiji (northern portion; now part of Yurihonjo-shi)
