= Jūmonji Station =

Railway station in Yokote, Akita Prefecture, Japan

Jūmonji Station 十文字駅
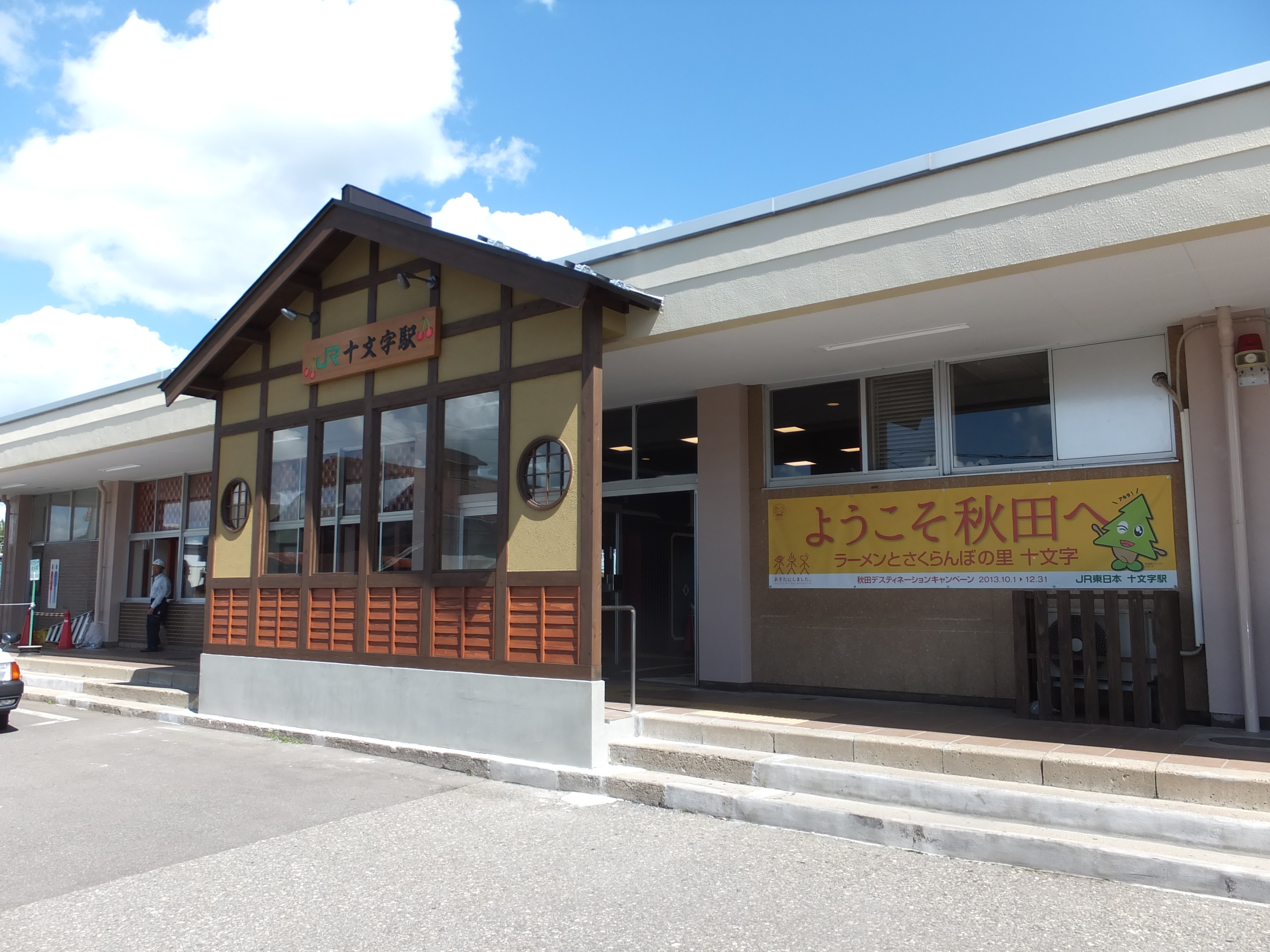
- Jūmonji Station (August 2013)

General information
- Location: Daidōhigashi-18-1 Jūmonjimachi, Yokote-shi, Akita-ken 019-0527; Japan
- Coordinates: 39°13′14″N 140°31′32″E
- Operator: JR East
- Line: ■ Ōu Main Line
- Distance: 217.8 kilometers from Fukushima
- Platforms: 1 side + 1 island platform

Other information
- Status: Staffed
- Website: Official website

History
- Opened: September 14, 1905

Passengers
- FY2021: 322 daily

Services
Preceding station	JR East	Following station
Yuzawa One-way operation	Ōu Main Line Rapid	Yokote towards Aomori
Shimo-Yuzawa towards Shinjō	Ōu Main Line Local	Daigo towards Aomori
Location
- Location within Akita Prefecture Location within Japan

Jūmonji Station (十文字駅, Jūmonji-eki) is a railway station on the Ōu Main Line in the city of Yokote, Akita Prefecture, Japan, operated by JR East.

== Lines ==
Jūmonji Station is served by the Ōu Main Line, and is located 217.8 km from the terminus of the line at Fukushima Station.

== Station layout ==
The station consists of one side platform and one island platform, connected by a footbridge. The station is staffed.

=== Platforms ===
1	■ Ōu Main Line	for Ōmagari and Akita
2, 3	■ Ōu Main Line	for Shinjō and Yamagata

== History ==
Jūmonji Station opened on September 14, 1905 as a station on the Japanese Government Railways (JGR), serving the village of Jūmonji, Akita. The JGR became the Japan National Railways (JNR) after World War II. Freight operations were discontinued from 1984. The station was absorbed into the JR East network upon the privatization of the JNR on April 1, 1987.

== Passenger statistics ==
In fiscal 2018, the station was used by an average of 416 passengers daily (boarding passengers only).

== Surrounding area ==
- Former Jūmonji town hall
- National Route 13

== See also ==
- List of railway stations in Japan
