= Onodera Yoshimichi =

Onodera Yoshimichi (小野寺義道) (1566–1646) was the son of Onodera Terumichi (minor daimyō of Dewa Province).

Yoshimichi was the lord of Omori Castle, and a longtime rival of the clan Mogami. Yoshimichi himself later became a Daimyō of the Dewa. During the year 1594, Mogami Yoshiaki, an old enemy of Yoshimichi, deceived him into punishing one of his chief retainers. This deception greatly affected the unity among the retainers.

Later on, Ōtani Yoshitsugu was to conduct land surveys in Yoshimichi's domain, but he was ultimately called off. Yoshimichi's castle of Omori was besieged during the year 1599. Yoshimichi went on to support Uesugi Kagekatsu during the Sekigahara Campaign, but was afterwards deprived of his lands and exiled to the Chūgoku region during the year 1601.
