= Yuzawa Station =

Railway station in Yuzawa, Akita Prefecture, Japan

Yuzawa Station 湯沢駅
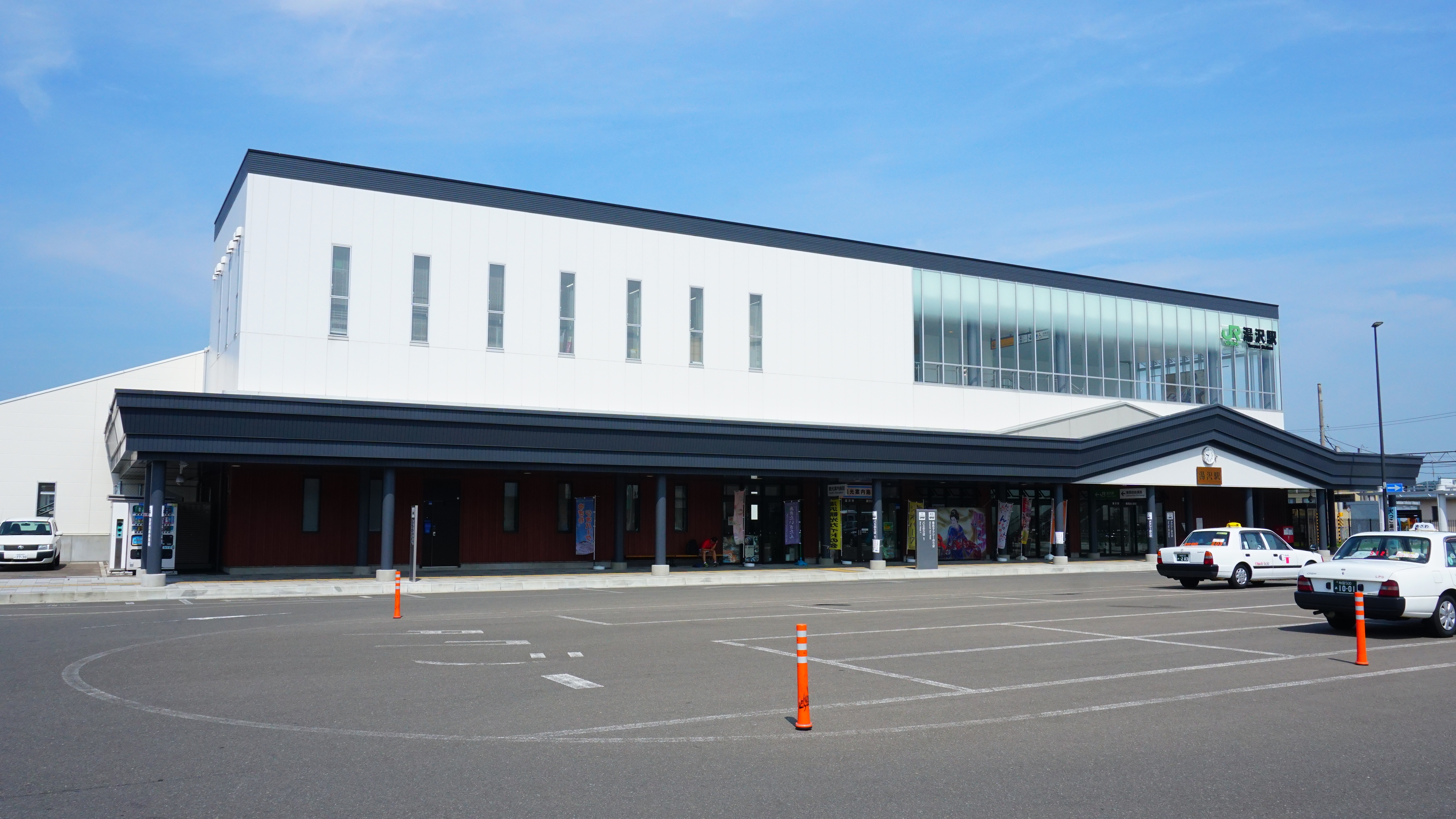
- Yuzawa Station in July 2018

General information
- Location: 2-2-10 Omotemachi, Yuzawa-shi, Akita-ken 012-0827; Japan
- Coordinates: 39°9′49.1″N 140°29′13.7″E
- Operator: JR East
- Line: ■ Ōu Main Line
- Distance: 210.4 kilometers from Fukushima
- Platforms: 1 side + 1 island platform

Other information
- Status: Staffed (Talking reserved seat ticket vending machine (話せる指定席券売機))
- Website: Official website

History
- Opened: July 5, 1905

Passengers
- FY2007: 631

Services
Preceding station	JR East	Following station
Terminus	Ōu Main Line Rapid	Jūmonji towards Aomori
Kami-Yuzawa towards Shinjō	Ōu Main Line Local	Shimo-Yuzawa towards Aomori
Location
- Location within Akita Prefecture Location within Japan

Yuzawa Station (湯沢駅, Yuzawa-eki) is a railway station on the Ōu Main Line in the city of Yuzawa, Akita Prefecture, Japan, operated by JR East.

== Lines ==
Yuzawa Station is served by the Ōu Main Line, and is located 210.4 km from the terminus of the line at Fukushima Station.

== Station layout ==
The station consists of one side platform and one island platform connected to the station building by a footbridge. The station is attended and has a Talking reserved seat ticket vending machine.

=== Platforms ===
1	■ Ōu Main Line	for Shinjō and Yamagata
2,3	■ Ōu Main Line	for Ōmagari and Akita

== History ==
Yuzawa Station opened on July 5, 1905 as a station on the Japanese Government Railways (JGR) Ōu South Line. The Ogachi Railway began operations on August 10, 1928 and was renamed the Dewa Railroad on May 1, 1944. The JGR became the Japan National Railways (JNR) after World War II. The Dewa Railway ceased operations from April 1, 1977. The station was absorbed into the JR East network upon the privatization of the JNR on April 1, 1987.

== Passenger statistics ==
In fiscal 2018, the station was used by an average of 631 passengers daily (boarding passengers only).

== Surrounding area ==
- National Route 13
- FM Yutopia

== See also ==
- List of railway stations in Japan
