= Yokobori Station =

Railway station in Yuzawa, Akita Prefecture, Japan

Yokobori Station 横堀駅
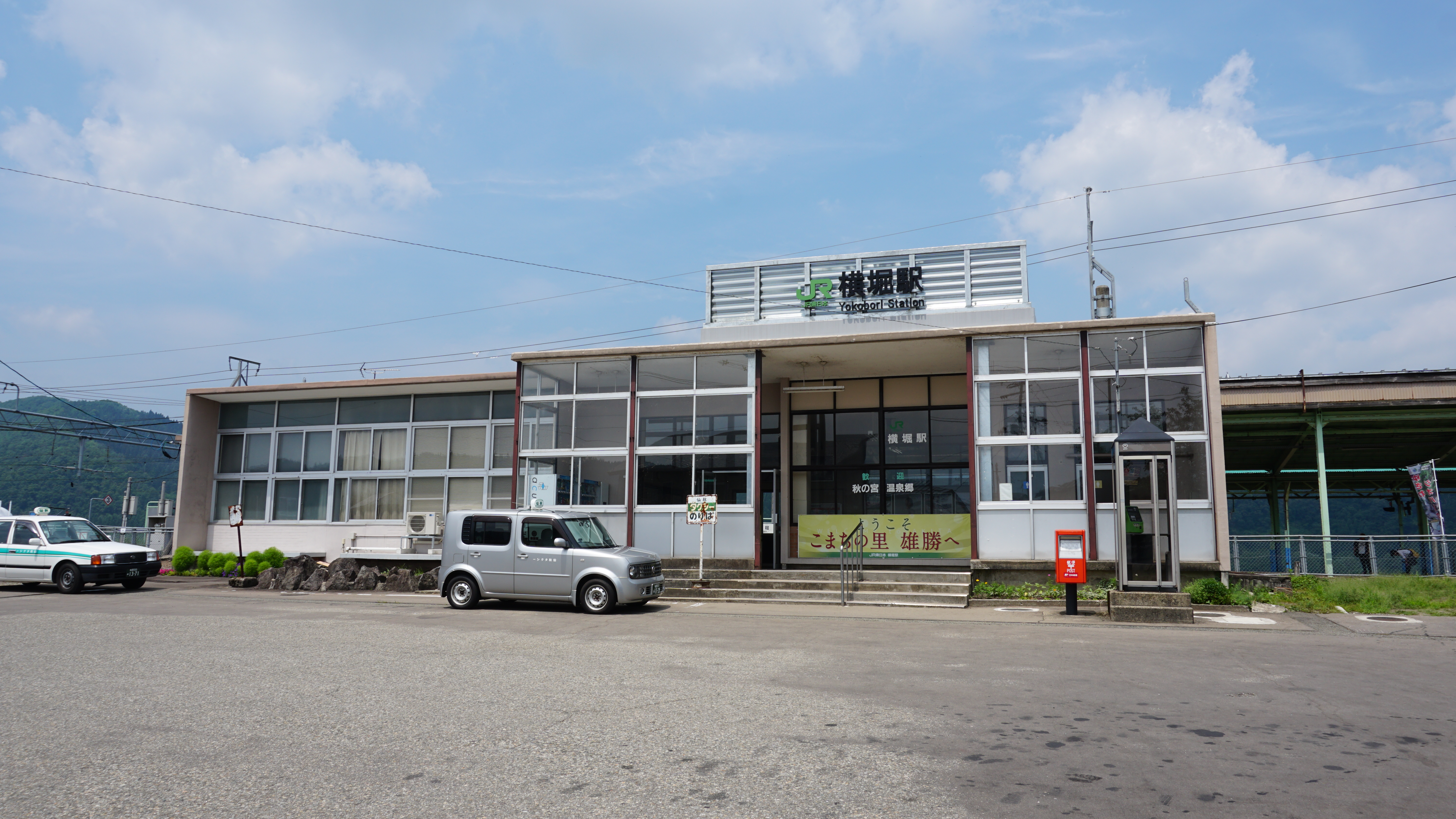
- Yokobori Station in July 2018

General information
- Location: 127-2, Ono Yuzawa-shi, Akita-ken 019-0205; Japan
- Coordinates: 39°3′52.5″N 140°27′5.4″E
- Operator: JR East
- Line: ■ Ōu Main Line
- Distance: 198.4 kilometers from Fukushima
- Platforms: 1 side + 1 island platform

Other information
- Status: Unstaffed station
- Website: Official website

History
- Opened: July 5, 1905

Passengers
- FY2018: 120

Services
| Preceding station | JR East | Following station |
|---|---|---|
| Innai towards Shinjō | Ōu Main Line Local | Mitsuseki towards Aomori |
Location
- Location within Akita Prefecture Location within Japan

Yokobori Station (横堀駅, Yokobori eki) is a railway station on the Ōu Main Line in the city of Yuzawa, Akita Prefecture, Japan, operated by JR East.

== Lines ==
Yokobori Station is served by the Ōu Main Line, and is located 198.4 km from the terminus of the line at Fukushima Station.

== Station layout ==
The station consists of one side platform and one island platform connected to the station building by a footbridge. The station is Unstaffed.

=== Platforms ===
| 1 | ■ Ōu Main Line | for Shinjō and Yamagata |
| 2, 3 | ■ Ōu Main Line | for Ōmagari and Akita |

== History ==
Yokobori Station opened on July 5, 1905, as a station on the Japanese Government Railways (JGR). The JGR became the Japan National Railways (JNR) after World War II. The station was absorbed into the JR East network upon the privatization of the JNR on April 1, 1987.

== Passenger statistics ==
In fiscal 2018, the station was used by an average of 120 passengers daily (boarding passengers only).

== Surrounding area ==
Yokobori is home to the Komachi-do temple that celebrates the Heian period poet Ono no Komachi, who died here. Every year when peonies are in full bloom lading the air with scent, normally the second Sunday of June, local people host the Komachi Matsuri. During the festival, seven "komachi musume" are reading out the waka poems, and small children parade through the area as well as a performance of Komachi taiko drums. About 30 minutes by car southeast from Yokobori along Japan National Route 108 is the Akinomiya Hot Spring Resort area.

== Gallery ==
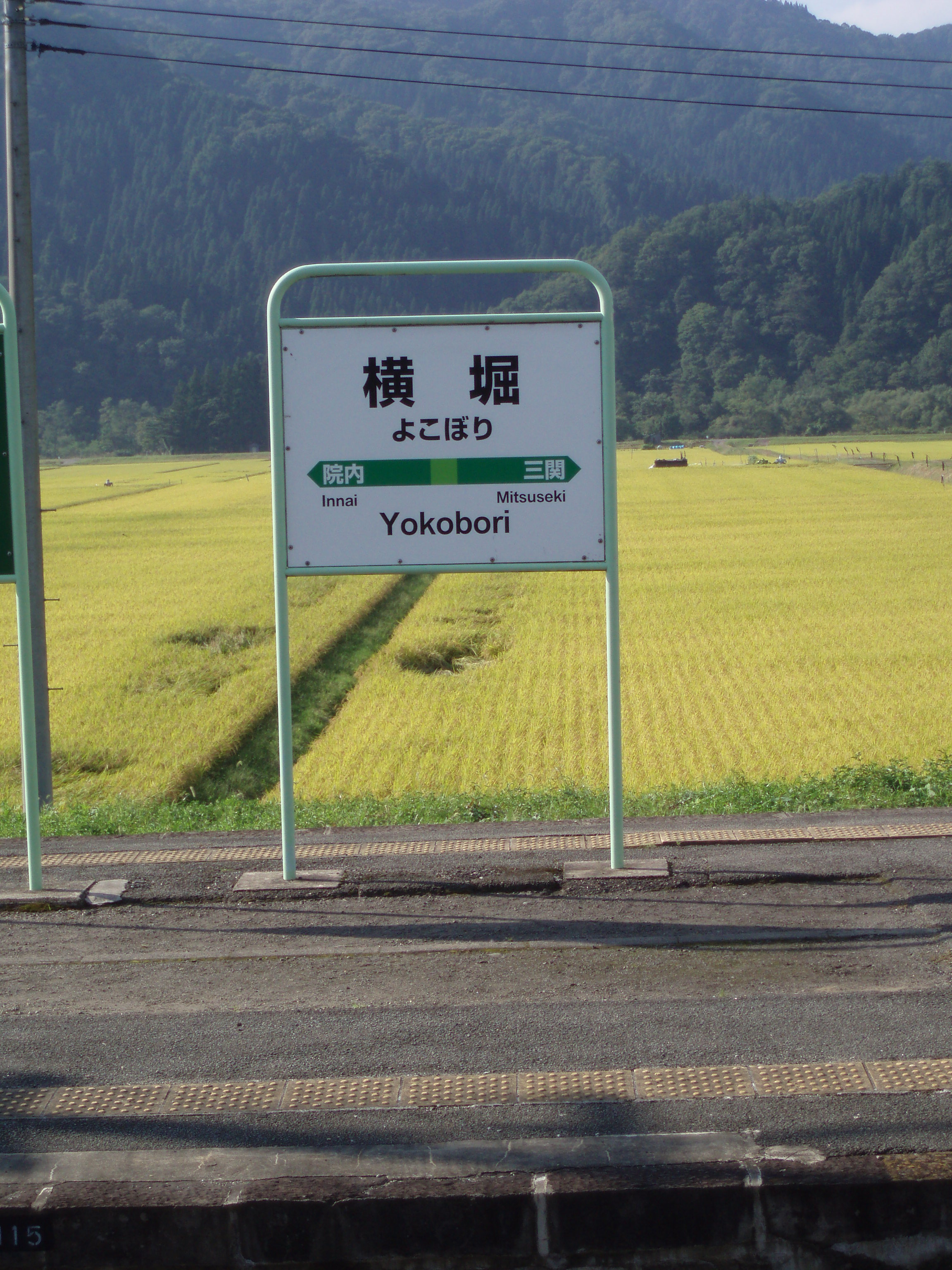
Yokobori Station platform sign

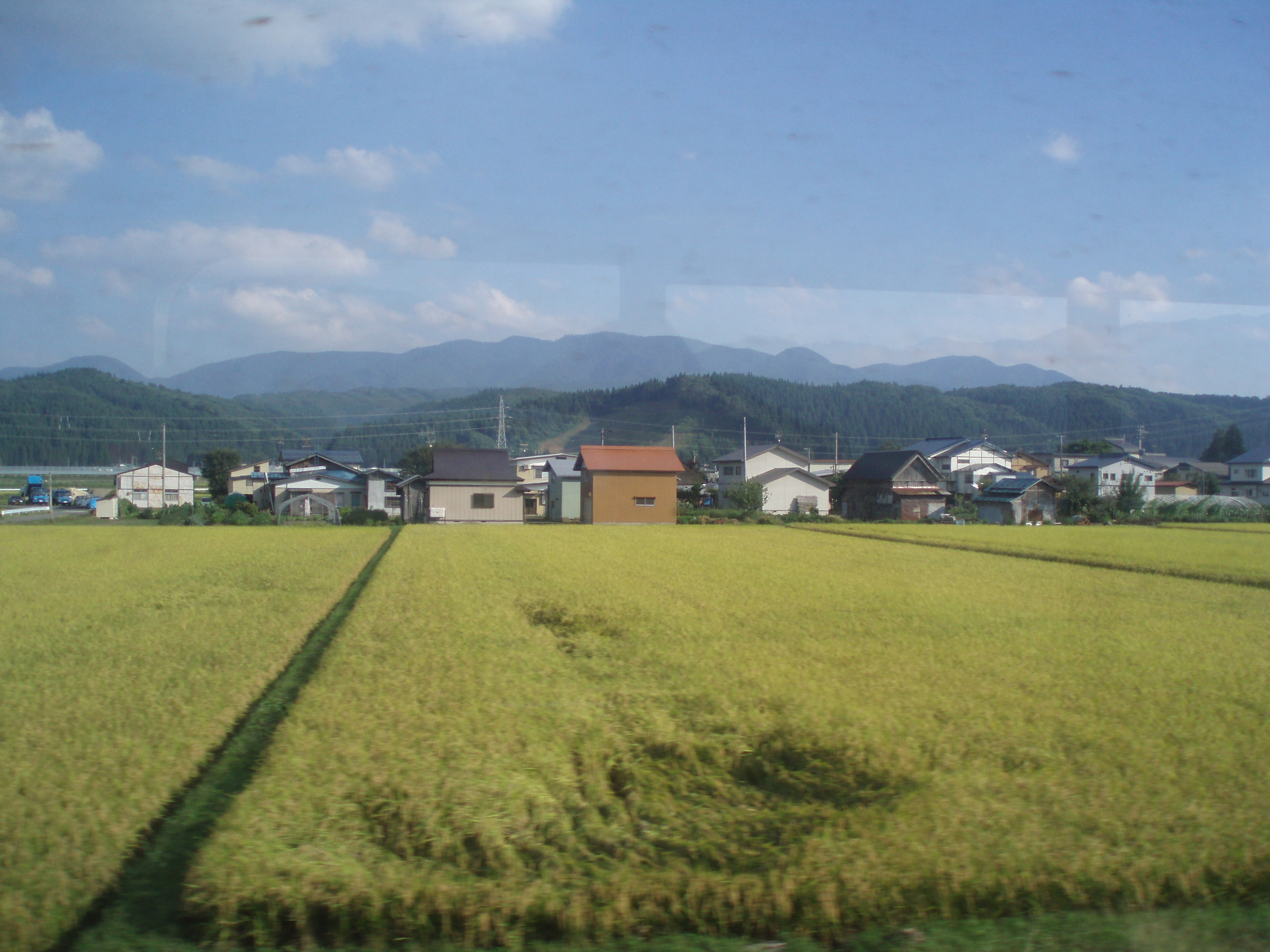
View from platform looking east

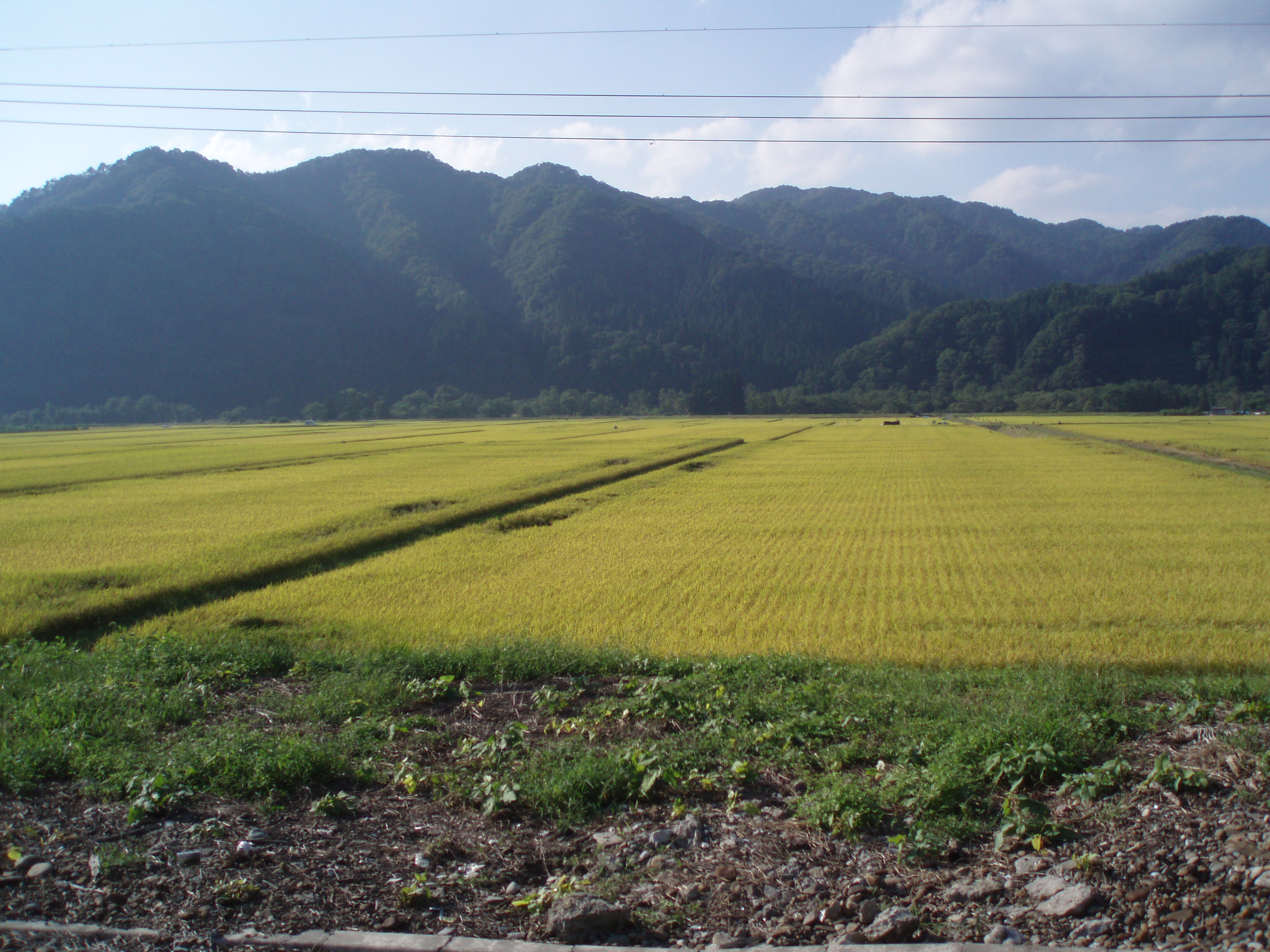
View from platform looking west

== See also ==
- List of railway stations in Japan
