= Mamurogawa =

Mamurogawa 真室川町
- Town
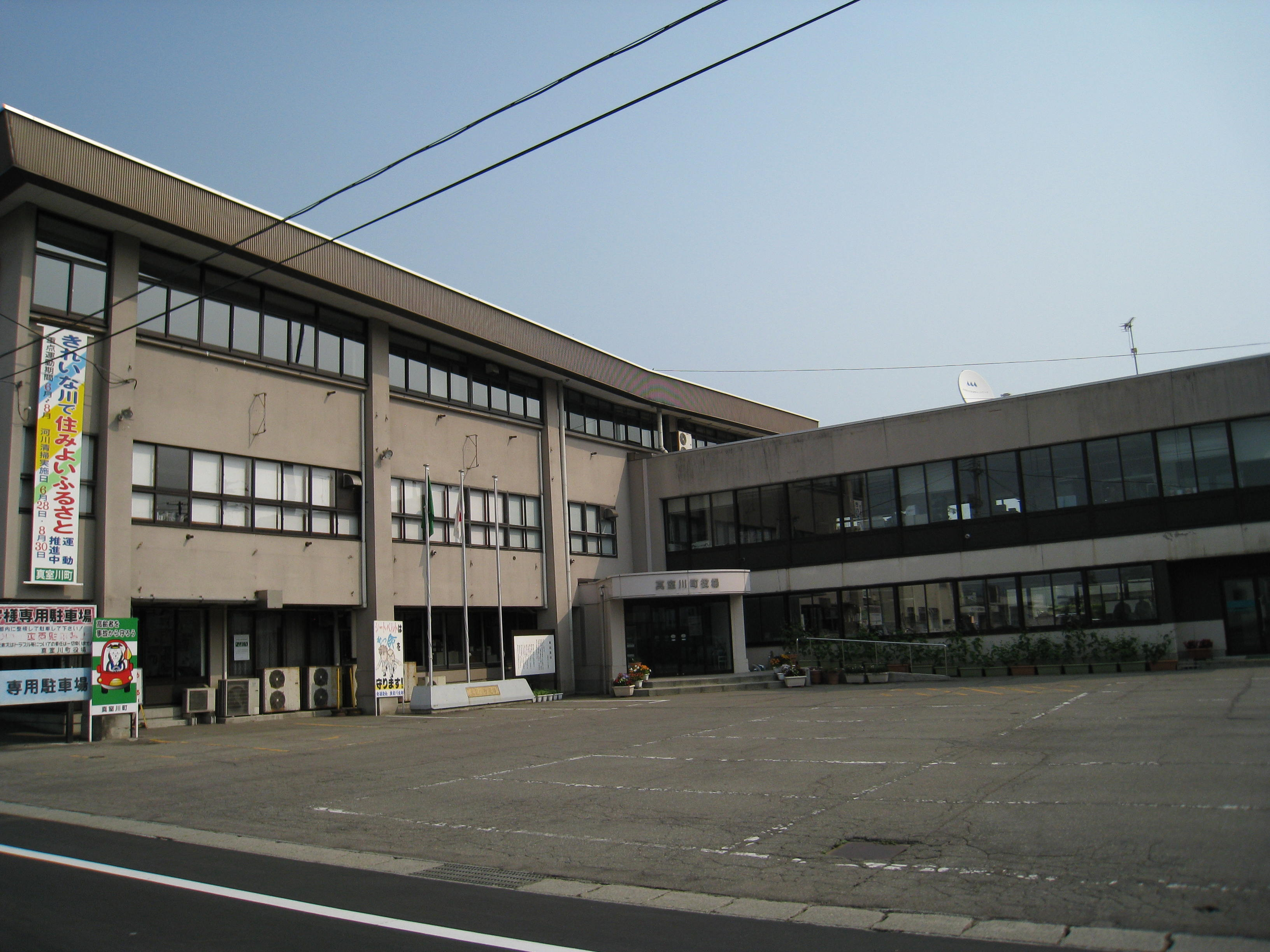
- Mamurogawa Town Hall

- Flag Seal
- Interactive map of Mamurogawa
- Coordinates: 38°51′28.4″N 140°15′8.3″E
- Country: Japan
- Region: Tōhoku
- Prefecture: Yamagata
- District: Mogami

Area
  - Total: 374.22 km^{2} (144.49 sq mi)

Population (March 31, 2023)
  - Total: 6,792
  - Density: 18.15/km^{2} (47.01/sq mi)
- Time zone: UTC+9 (Japan Standard Time)
- Phone number: 0233-62-2111
- Address: 127-7 Shincho, Mamurogawa-machi, Mogami-gun, Yamagata-ken 999-5301
- Climate: Cfa/Dfa
- Website: Official website
- Symbols
- Flower: Prunus mume
- Tree: Prunus mume

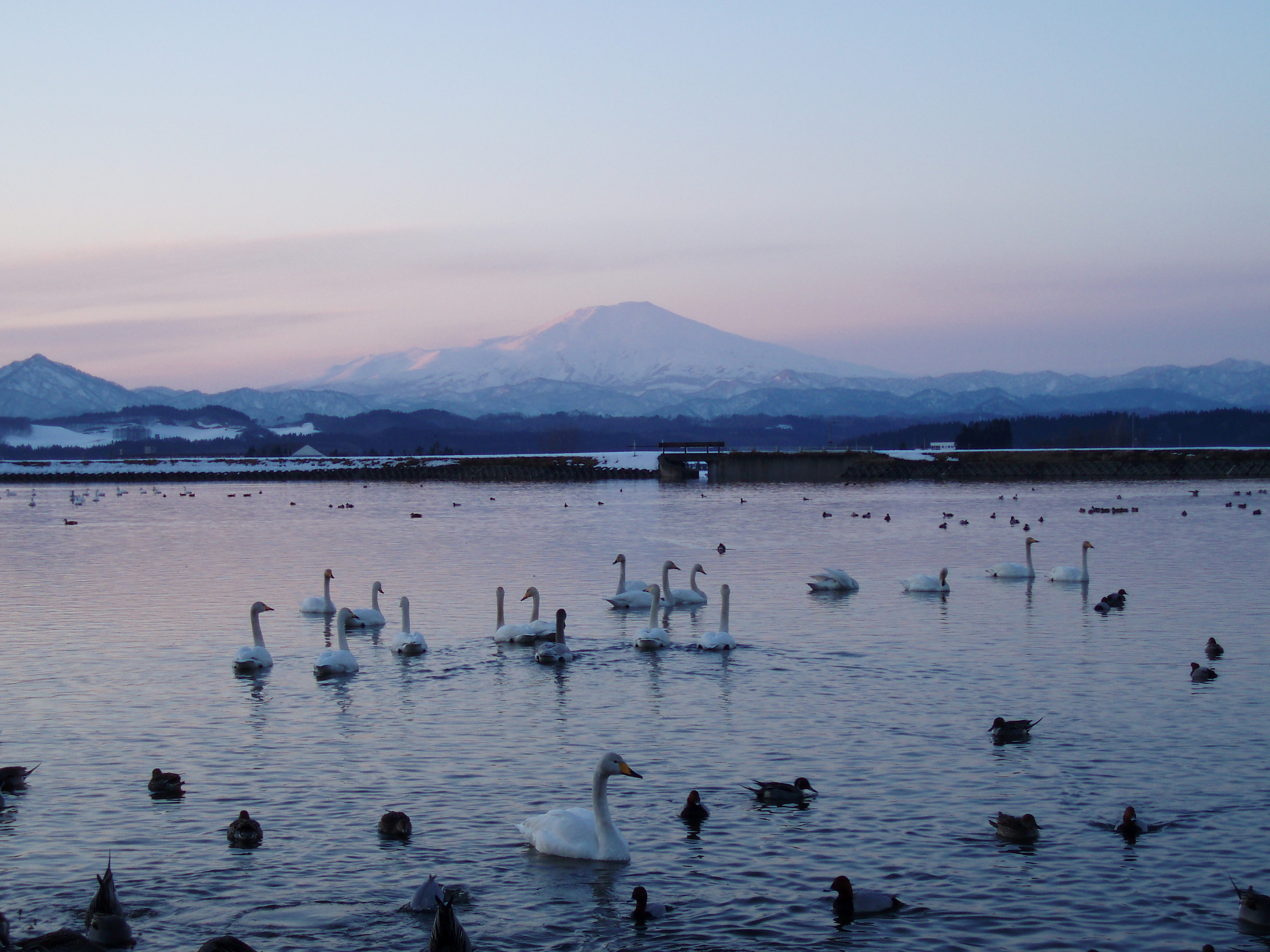
Pond in Nonomura neighborhood of Mamurogawa with Mount Chōkai in the distance

Mamurogawa (真室川町, Mamurogawa-machi) is a town located in Yamagata Prefecture, Japan. As of 31 March 2023, the town has an estimated population of 6,792 in 2560 households, and a population density of 18 persons per km^{2}. The total area of the town is 374.22 square kilometres (144 sq mi).

== Geography ==
Mamurogawa is located in the northern portion of the Shinjō Basin in north-central Yamagata Prefecture. The basin is surrounded on all sides by low mountains, with the Ōu Mountains to the northeast and the Dewa Mountains running from the west to the north. The area is known for its heavy snowfalls in winter.

=== Neighboring municipalities ===
Akita Prefecture

- Yurihonjō
- Yuzawa

Yamagata Prefecture

- Kaneyama
- Sakata
- Sakegawa
- Shinjō

=== Climate ===
Mamurogawa has a humid continental climate (Köppen climate classification Cfa) with large seasonal temperature differences, with warm to hot (and often humid) summers and cold (sometimes severely cold) winters. Precipitation is significant throughout the year, but is heaviest from August to October. The average annual temperature in Mamurogawa is 10.2 °C (50.4 °F). The average annual rainfall is 2,810.9 mm (110.67 in) with July as the wettest month. The temperatures are highest on average in August, at around 23.2 °C (73.8 °F), and lowest in January, at around −1.0 °C (30.2 °F).

Climate data for Mamurogawa, elevation 88 m (289 ft), (1991-2020 normals, extremes 1976-present)
Month	Jan	Feb	Mar	Apr	May	Jun	Jul	Aug	Sep	Oct	Nov	Dec	Year
Record high °C (°F)	12.4 (54.3)	13.8 (56.8)	18.5 (65.3)	29.2 (84.6)	32.6 (90.7)	32.2 (90.0)	35.9 (96.6)	36.1 (97.0)	34.2 (93.6)	28.1 (82.6)	21.2 (70.2)	18.2 (64.8)	36.1 (97.0)
Mean daily maximum °C (°F)	1.9 (35.4)	2.9 (37.2)	6.4 (43.5)	13.4 (56.1)	20.1 (68.2)	23.9 (75.0)	27.0 (80.6)	28.6 (83.5)	24.3 (75.7)	17.8 (64.0)	10.7 (51.3)	4.2 (39.6)	15.1 (59.2)
Daily mean °C (°F)	−1.0 (30.2)	−0.7 (30.7)	1.6 (34.9)	7.0 (44.6)	13.8 (56.8)	18.4 (65.1)	22.2 (72.0)	23.2 (73.8)	18.9 (66.0)	12.2 (54.0)	6.0 (42.8)	1.1 (34.0)	10.2 (50.4)
Mean daily minimum °C (°F)	−3.9 (25.0)	−4.1 (24.6)	−2.3 (27.9)	1.5 (34.7)	8.1 (46.6)	13.5 (56.3)	18.3 (64.9)	19.1 (66.4)	14.8 (58.6)	7.9 (46.2)	2.3 (36.1)	−1.5 (29.3)	6.1 (43.1)
Record low °C (°F)	−14.6 (5.7)	−15.1 (4.8)	−16.0 (3.2)	−7.9 (17.8)	−0.6 (30.9)	3.1 (37.6)	8.3 (46.9)	9.5 (49.1)	3.7 (38.7)	−1.5 (29.3)	−5.7 (21.7)	−13.5 (7.7)	−16.0 (3.2)
Average precipitation mm (inches)	270.7 (10.66)	196.1 (7.72)	181.1 (7.13)	154.5 (6.08)	180.5 (7.11)	189.8 (7.47)	339.7 (13.37)	275.4 (10.84)	198.2 (7.80)	228.7 (9.00)	286.1 (11.26)	310.0 (12.20)	2,810.9 (110.67)
Average precipitation days (≥ 1.0 mm)	25.5	21.9	19.5	14.8	13.0	11.9	15.0	13.2	14.4	15.9	20.0	24.7	209.8
Mean monthly sunshine hours	35.4	54.8	102.6	152.5	192.0	165.8	138.4	174.7	131.6	115.2	74.8	37.9	1,378.3
Source: Japan Meteorological Agency

== Demographics ==
Per Japanese census data, the population of Mamurogawa peaked in the 1950s and has declined by more than half since then. It is now less than it was a century ago.

Historical population
Year	Pop.	±%
1920	11,050	—
1930	12,499	+13.1%
1940	13,629	+9.0%
1950	17,020	+24.9%
1960	16,856	−1.0%
1970	13,976	−17.1%
1980	12,888	−7.8%
1990	12,230	−5.1%
2000	10,592	−13.4%
2010	9,165	−13.5%
2020	7,203	−21.4%

== History ==
The area of present-day Mamurogawa was part of ancient Dewa Province and the location of Sakenobe Castle in the Sengoku period. After the start of the Meiji period, the area became part of Mogami District, Yamagata Prefecture. The village of Mamurogawa was established on April 1, 1889, with the establishment of the modern municipalities system. During World War II, an airbase for training pilots was established by the Imperial Japanese Army. The site is now a park, and part of the grounds of the local high school. Mamurogawa was elevated to town status on April 1, 1950. On August 1, 1954, it absorbed the neighboring villages of Araki and Nozoki.

== Economy ==
The economy of Mamurogawa is based on agriculture and forestry. The main crops are rice and tara-no-me, a spring herb.

== Education ==
Mamurogawa has three public elementary schools and one public middle school operated by the town government and one public high school operated by the Yamagata Prefectural Board of Education.

== Transportation ==
=== Railway ===
East Japan Railway Company - Ōu Main Line

- Mamurogawa - Kamabuchi - Ōtaki - Nozoki

=== Highway ===
- Tōhoku-Chūō Expressway – Mamurogawa interchange
- National Route 13
- National Route 344

== Local attractions ==
- Kabusan Prefectural Park
- Tokasaka Dam
