= Kurikoma Quasi-National Park =

Quasi-national park in Tohoku region, Japan

- 栗駒国定公園
- IUCN category II (national park)
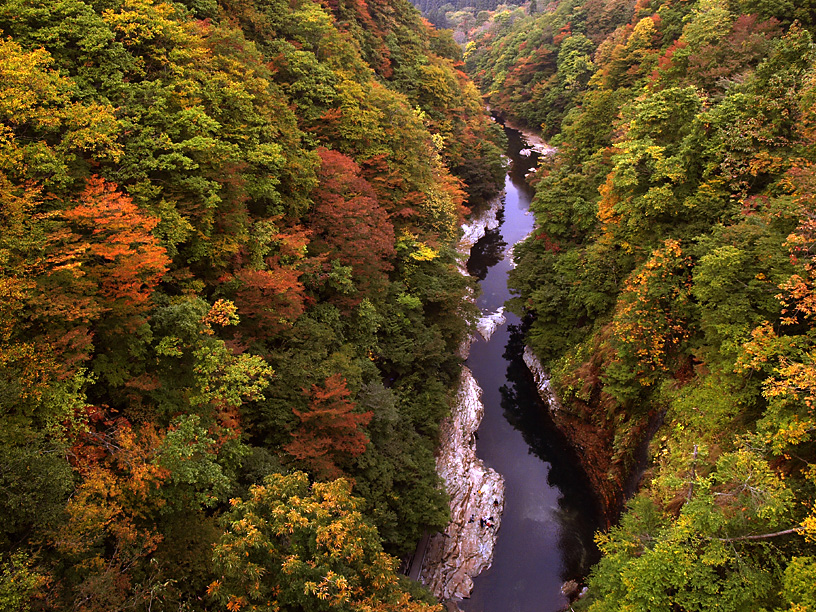
- Oyasu-kyō Ravine

- Location within Miyagi Prefecture Location within Japan
- Location: Tōhoku, Japan
- Coordinates: 38°52′N 140°38′E
- Area: 771.4 km^{2} (297.8 sq mi)
- Established: 22 July 1968

Kurikoma Quasi-National Park (栗駒国定公園, Kurikoma Kokutei Kōen) is a Quasi-National Park that covers parts of the Akita, Iwate, Miyagi, and Yamagata Prefectures in Japan. Established in 1968, the central feature of the park is the 1,627 m (5,338 ft) high Mount Kurikoma (栗駒山). It is rated a protected landscape (category II) according to the IUCN.

Like all Quasi-National Parks in Japan, the park is managed by the local prefectural governments.

== Related municipalities ==
- Akita: Higashinaruse, Yuzawa
- Iwate: Ichinoseki, Kanegasaki, Kitakami, Nishiwaga, Ōshū
- Miyagi: Kurihara, Ōsaki
- Yamagata: Kaneyama, Mogami, Shinjō

== See also ==
- National Parks of Japan
