= Mogami District =

District in Yamagata prefecture, Japan

Coordinates: 38°55′30″N 140°15′36″E

- List of Provinces of Japan > Tōsandō > Uzen Province > Mogami District
- Japan > Tōhoku region > Yamagata Prefecture > Mogami District

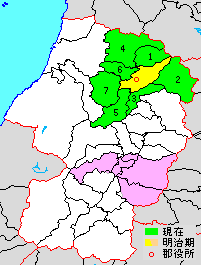
Map showing original extent of Mogami District in Yamagata Prefecture yellow & green - original extent in Meiji period green - present area pink - location in pre-Meiji period.: 1. Kaneyama; 2. Mogami; 3. Funagata; 4. Mamurogawa; 5. Ōkura; 6. Sakegawa; 7. Tozawa

Mogami District (最上郡, Mogami-gun) is a rural district located in Yamagata Prefecture, Japan. As of August 2013, the district has an estimated population of 42,788 and an area of 1,508.54 km^{2}. All of the city of Shinjō was formerly part of Mogami District.

== Towns and villages ==
- Funagata
- Kaneyama
- Mamurogawa
- Mogami
- Ōkura
- Sakegawa
- Tozawa

== History ==
Mogami County was an ancient place name in part of Dewa Province; however, it was located to the south of the present Mogami District, in an area corresponding roughly to modern Higashimurayama District and parts of Nishimurayama District.

Under the Tokugawa shogunate, much of the area of modern Mogami District was ruled as part of Shinjō Domain. Following the Meiji restoration it came under the new province of Uzen Province, which became part of Yamagata Prefecture in 1876. At that time, the area consisted of 2 towns and 86 villages. The area was organized as modern Mogami District in 1878.

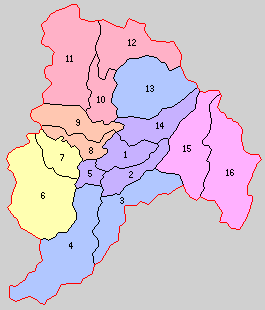
Historic Map of Mogami District: Purple - Shinjō-shi: 1. Shinjō; 2. Inafune; 5. Yamuki; 14. Hagino; Pink - Mogami-machi: 15. Nishi-Oguni; 16. Higashi-Oguni; Red - Mamurogawa-machi: 10. Mamurogawa; 11. Araki; 12. Nozoki; Orange - Sakegawa-mura: 8. Sakegawa; 9. Toyosato; Yellow - Tozawa-mura: 6. Furukuchi; 7. Tozawa; Blue - areas which have remained unchanged: 3. Funagata; 4. Ōkura; 13. Kaneyama

With the establishment of the municipality system on April 1, 1889, one town (Shinjo) and 15 villages were established. Kaneyama was raised to town status on January 1, 1925 and Shinjō was raised to city status on April 1, 1949. Mamurogawa was raised to town status on April 1, 1950 and the towns of Mogami and Funagata were created on September 1 and December 1, 1954.
