= Nozoki Station =

Railway station in Mamurogawa, Yamagata Prefecture, Japan

Nozoki Station 及位駅
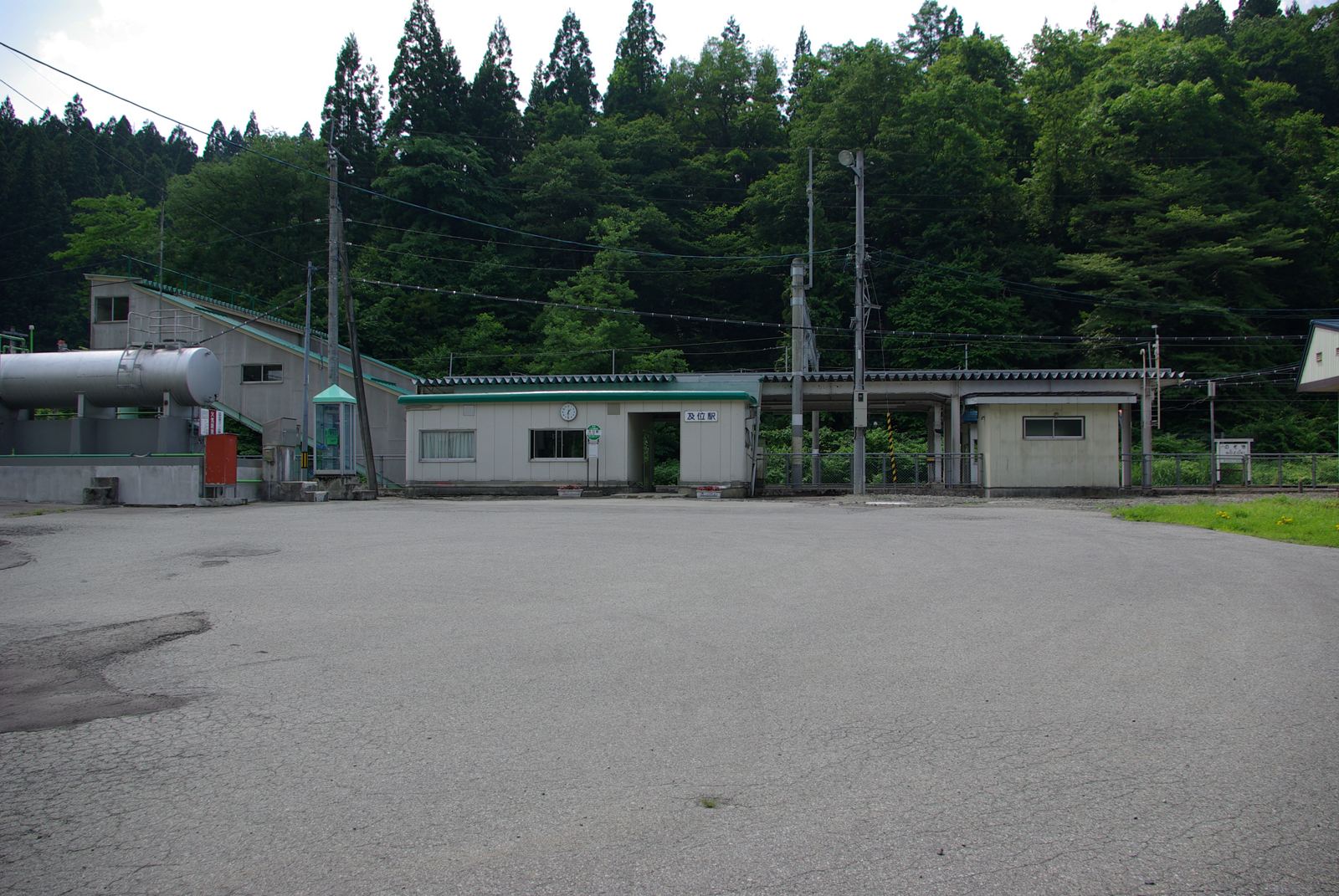
- Nozoki Station, July 2009

General information
- Location: Nozoki, Mamurogawa-machi, Mogami-gun, Yamagata-ken 999-5602; Japan
- Coordinates: 38°59′34.7″N 140°21′40.2″E
- Operator: JR East
- Line: ■ Ōu Main Line
- Distance: 37.2 kilometers from Shinjō
- Platforms: 1 side platform, 1 island platform

Other information
- Status: Unstaffed
- Website: Official website

History
- Opened: October 21, 1904

Passengers
- FY2004: 20

Services
| Preceding station | JR East | Following station |
|---|---|---|
| Ōtaki towards Shinjō | Ōu Main Line Local | Innai towards Aomori |
Location
- Location within Yamagata Prefecture Location within Japan

Nozoki Station (及位駅, Nozoki eki) is a railway station located in the town of Mamurogawa, Yamagata Prefecture, Japan, operated by the East Japan Railway Company (JR East).

== Lines ==
Nozoki Station is served by the Ōu Main Line, and is located 185.8 rail kilometers from the terminus of the line at Fukushima Station.

== Station layout ==
The station has a single side platform and an island platform, connected by a footbridge. The station is unattended.

=== Platforms ===
| 1 | ■ Ōu Main Line | for Yokote, Yuzawa and Akita |
| 2 | ■ Ōu Main Line | for Shinjō |
| 3 | ■ Ōu Main Line | not in normal use |

== History ==
Nozoki Station opened on October 21, 1904 as a station on the Japanese Government Railways (JGR). The JGR became the Japan National Railways (JNR) after World War II. The station was absorbed into the JR East network upon the privatization of the JNR on April 1, 1987.

== Surrounding area ==
- National Route 13
- Kabusan Prefectural Park

== See also ==
- List of railway stations in Japan
