= Ōtaki Station =

Ōtaki Station or Otaki Station may refer to:

- Ōtaki Station (Chiba) (大多喜駅), Chiba Prefecture, Japan
- Ōtaki Station (Yamagata) (大滝駅), Yamagata Prefecture, Japan
- Otaki railway station, Wellington Region, New Zealand
