= Kaneyama, Yamagata =

Kaneyama 金山町
- Town
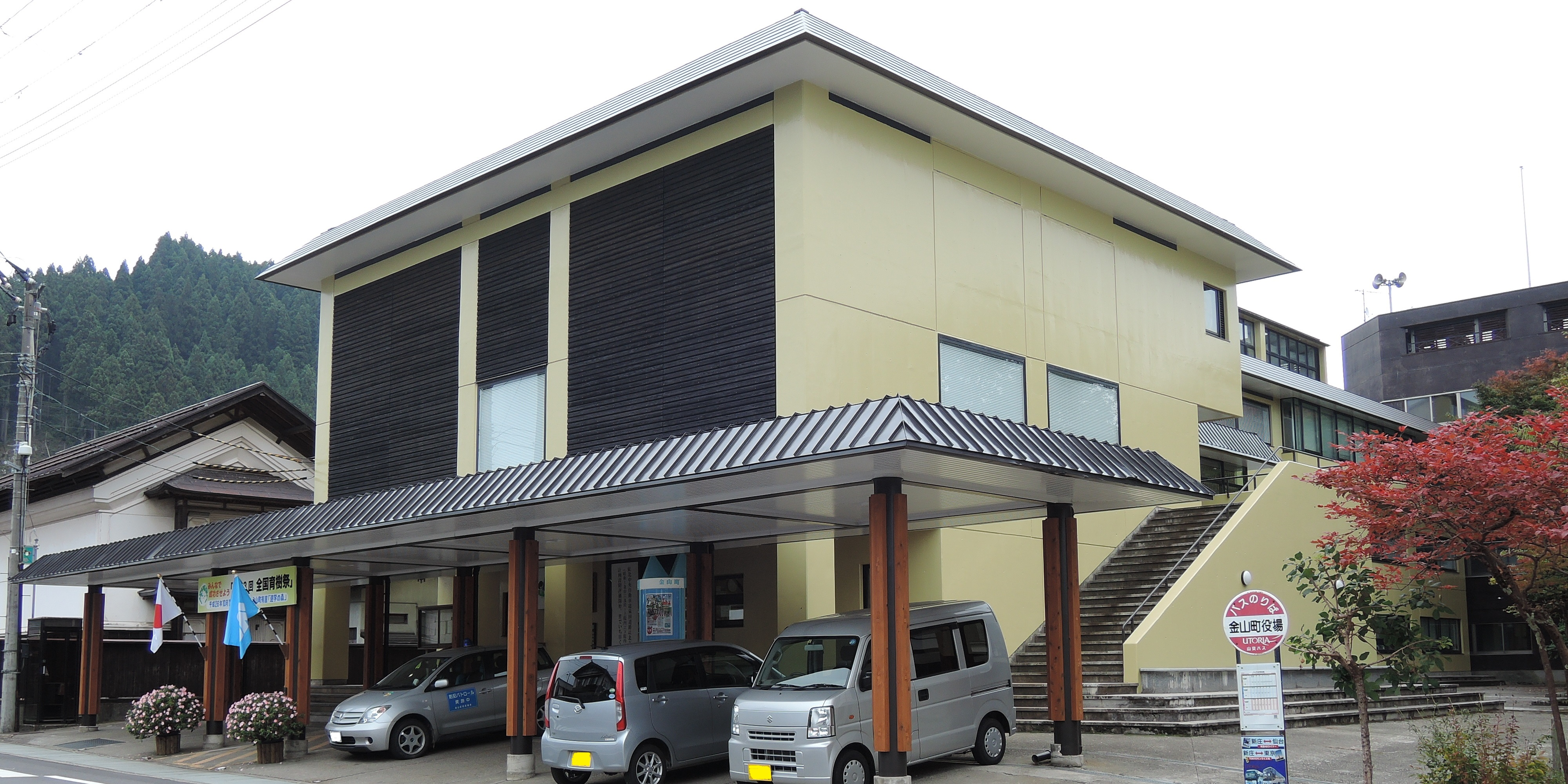
- Kaneyama town hall

- Flag Seal

- Location of Kaneyama in Yamagata Prefecture

- Coordinates: 38°53′0.4″N 140°20′21.8″E
- Country: Japan
- Region: Tōhoku
- Prefecture: Yamagata
- District: Mogami

Area
  - Total: 161.79 km^{2} (62.47 sq mi)

Population (January 2020)
  - Total: 5,205
  - Density: 32.17/km^{2} (83.32/sq mi)
- Time zone: UTC+9 (Japan Standard Time)
- Phone number: 0233-52-2111
- Address: 324-1 Kaneyama, Kaneyama-machi, Mogami-gun, Yamagata-ken 999-5402
- Climate: Cfa/Dfa
- Website: Official website
- Symbols
- Tree: Japanese beech, Japanese cedar, Kousa Dogwood

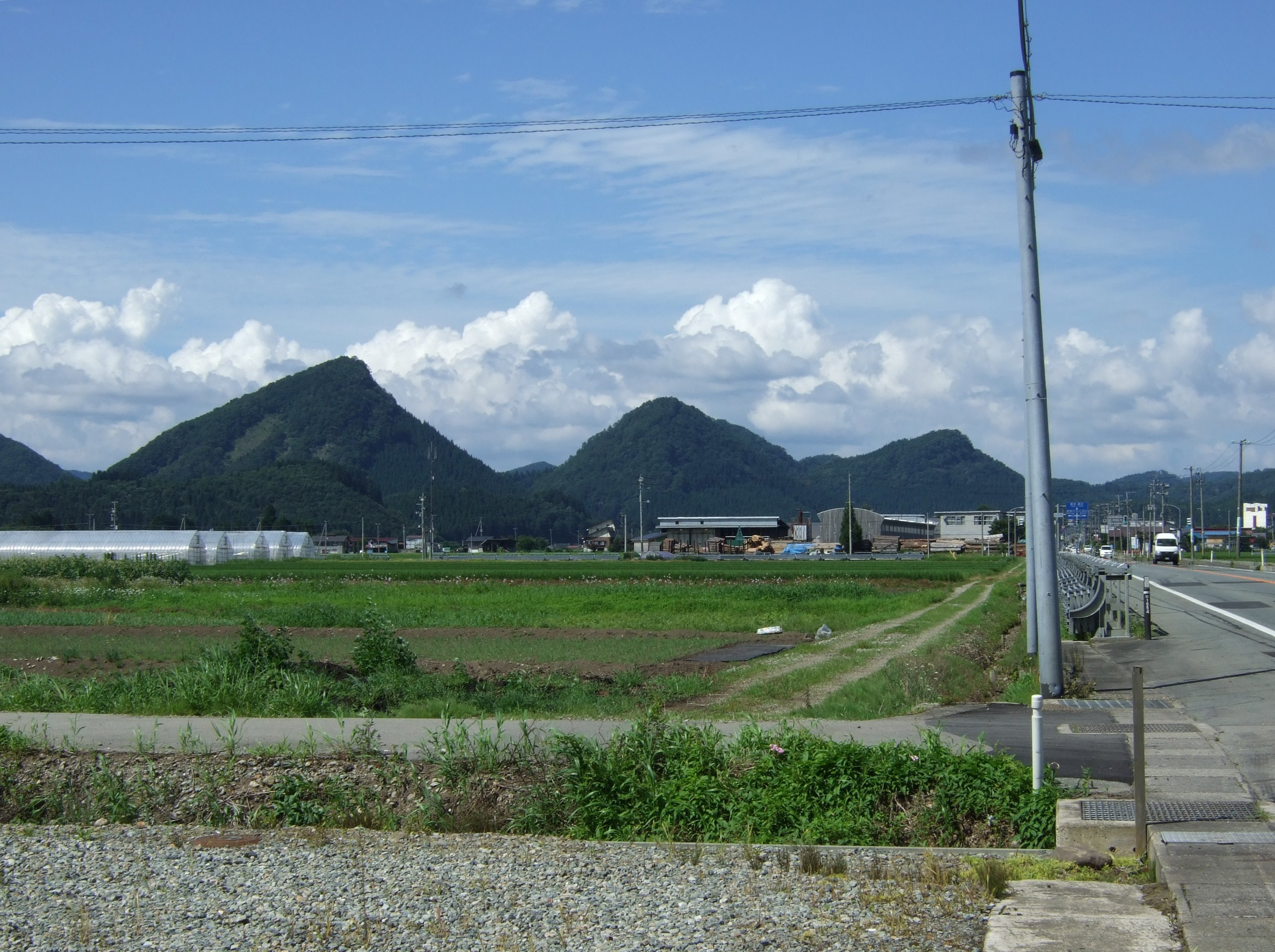
Kaneyama scene

Kaneyama (金山町, Kaneyama-machi) is a town located in Yamagata Prefecture, Japan. As of 1 January 2020, the town has an estimated population of 5,205, and a population density of 35 persons per km^{2}. The total area of the town is 161.79 square kilometres (62 sq mi).

== Geography ==
Kaneyama is located in northeastern Yamagata Prefecture, bordered to the north by Akita Prefecture. The town is at an elevation of between 100 and 400 meters, surrounded by 1000 meter mountains. The area is known for its extremely heavy snowfalls in winter. There are many osegi waterways running through the town. Part of the town is within the borders of the Kurikoma Quasi-National Park

=== Neighboring municipalities ===
- Akita Prefecture
  - Yuzawa
- Yamagata Prefecture
  - Sakegawa
  - Shinjō

=== Climate ===
Kaneyama has a humid continental climate (Köppen climate classification Dfa) with large seasonal temperature differences, with warm to hot (and often humid) summers and cold (sometimes severely cold) winters. Precipitation is significant throughout the year, but is heaviest from August to October. The average annual temperature in Kaneyama is 10.3 °C (50.5 °F). The average annual rainfall is 2,078.4 mm (81.83 in) with July as the wettest month. The temperatures are highest on average in August, at around 23.3 °C (73.9 °F), and lowest in January, at around −1.4 °C (29.5 °F).

Climate data for Kaneyama, elevation 170 m (560 ft), (1991−2020 normals, extremes 1976−present)
Month	Jan	Feb	Mar	Apr	May	Jun	Jul	Aug	Sep	Oct	Nov	Dec	Year
Record high °C (°F)	11.6 (52.9)	12.9 (55.2)	19.3 (66.7)	28.5 (83.3)	33.0 (91.4)	33.5 (92.3)	36.1 (97.0)	36.8 (98.2)	34.5 (94.1)	29.0 (84.2)	21.3 (70.3)	19.6 (67.3)	36.8 (98.2)
Mean daily maximum °C (°F)	1.4 (34.5)	2.4 (36.3)	6.1 (43.0)	13.5 (56.3)	20.2 (68.4)	24.1 (75.4)	27.1 (80.8)	28.7 (83.7)	24.4 (75.9)	17.8 (64.0)	10.5 (50.9)	3.8 (38.8)	15.0 (59.0)
Daily mean °C (°F)	−1.4 (29.5)	−1.0 (30.2)	1.7 (35.1)	7.6 (45.7)	14.1 (57.4)	18.6 (65.5)	22.3 (72.1)	23.3 (73.9)	19.1 (66.4)	12.4 (54.3)	6.1 (43.0)	0.8 (33.4)	10.3 (50.5)
Mean daily minimum °C (°F)	−4.2 (24.4)	−4.2 (24.4)	−2.0 (28.4)	2.4 (36.3)	8.7 (47.7)	13.9 (57.0)	18.5 (65.3)	19.2 (66.6)	14.9 (58.8)	8.1 (46.6)	2.4 (36.3)	−1.7 (28.9)	6.3 (43.4)
Record low °C (°F)	−13.6 (7.5)	−13.2 (8.2)	−12.7 (9.1)	−7.0 (19.4)	0.1 (32.2)	4.6 (40.3)	9.5 (49.1)	10.0 (50.0)	3.4 (38.1)	−1.7 (28.9)	−5.8 (21.6)	−12.7 (9.1)	−13.6 (7.5)
Average precipitation mm (inches)	211.4 (8.32)	141.2 (5.56)	128.3 (5.05)	106.1 (4.18)	130.5 (5.14)	136.6 (5.38)	258.4 (10.17)	223.4 (8.80)	159.5 (6.28)	161.8 (6.37)	190.5 (7.50)	230.7 (9.08)	2,078.4 (81.83)
Average snowfall cm (inches)	281 (111)	208 (82)	134 (53)	14 (5.5)	0 (0)	0 (0)	0 (0)	0 (0)	0 (0)	0 (0)	12 (4.7)	164 (65)	813 (320)
Average extreme snow depth cm (inches)	112 (44)	134 (53)	110 (43)	35 (14)	0 (0)	0 (0)	0 (0)	0 (0)	0 (0)	0 (0)	6 (2.4)	55 (22)	137 (54)
Average precipitation days (≥ 1.0 mm)	24.7	20.7	18.6	14.0	12.7	11.4	14.0	13.0	13.6	14.8	18.9	23.1	199.5
Average snowy days (≥ 3 cm)	23.0	18.8	16.0	1.9	0	0	0	0	0	0	1.2	13.6	74.5
Mean monthly sunshine hours	34.7	54.0	99.5	155.7	187.3	169.2	141.6	175.3	135.2	114.3	75.2	38.9	1,375.5
Source: Japan Meteorological Agency

== Demographics ==
Per Japanese census data, the population of Kaneyama peaked in the 1950s has been decreasing over the past 70 years. It is now less than it was a century ago.

Historical population
Year	Pop.	±%
1920	7,815	—
1930	8,490	+8.6%
1940	8,646	+1.8%
1950	10,299	+19.1%
1960	10,012	−2.8%
1970	8,430	−15.8%
1980	8,037	−4.7%
1990	7,886	−1.9%
2000	7,381	−6.4%
2010	6,365	−13.8%
2020	5,071	−20.3%

== History ==
The area of present-day was Kaneyama part of ancient Dewa Province and during the Nara Period and early Heian period was an important fortified point on the road connecting Akita Castle on the Sea of Japan with Tagajo on the Pacific Ocean. During the Sengoku period, the area was under the control of the Mogami clan, who built Kaneyama Castle on what is now the center of the modern town. During the Edo period, the town was a post town on the Ushū Kaidō connecting Edo with what is now Aomori. The mountain passes north of the town center were a battlefield in the Boshin War of the Meiji restoration. After the start of the Meiji period, the area became part of Mogami District, Yamagata Prefecture. The village of Kaneyama was established on April 1, 1889, with the establishment of the modern municipalities system and was raised to town status on January 1, 1925.

== Economy ==
The main industry is agriculture, livestock and forestry. Kaneyama is particularly famed for its cedar trees, and houses built in the traditional style (with cedar wood and white walls) can be seen around the town. The town is also noted for its production of ornamental (nishiki) koi.

These figures were taken from the 2000 census:

Primary sector (agriculture and forestry) - 15%
Secondary sector (manufacturing and construction) - 49%
Tertiary sector (services) - 36%

== Education ==
Kaneyama has three public elementary schools and one public middle school operated by the city government and one public high school operated by the Yamagata Prefectural Board of Education.

== Transportation ==
=== Railways ===
Kaneyama does not have any passenger railway service. The nearest Shinkansen station is in neighbouring Shinjō.

=== Major roads ===
- Tōhoku-Chūō Expressway
- National Route 13
- National Route 344

== Local attractions ==
=== Isabella Bird Memorial ===
British explorer Isabella Bird mentioned Kaneyama favourably in her account of her 1878 travels in Japan, Unbeaten Tracks in Japan:

"After leaving Shinjō this morning we crossed over a steep ridge into a singular basin of great beauty, with a semi-circle of pyramidal hills, rendered more striking by being covered to their summits with pyramidal cryptomeria, and apparently blocking all northward progress. At their feet lies Kanayama in a romantic situation, and, though I arrived as early as noon, I am staying for a day or two, for my room at the Transport Office is cheerful and pleasant, the agent is most polite, a very rough region lies before me, and Ito has secured a chicken for the first time since leaving Nikkō!"

A monument commemorating Isabella Bird can be seen in the town centre.

== Notable people from Kaneyama ==
- Koichi Kishi, politician
