= Tozawa, Yamagata =

Tozawa 戸沢村
- Village
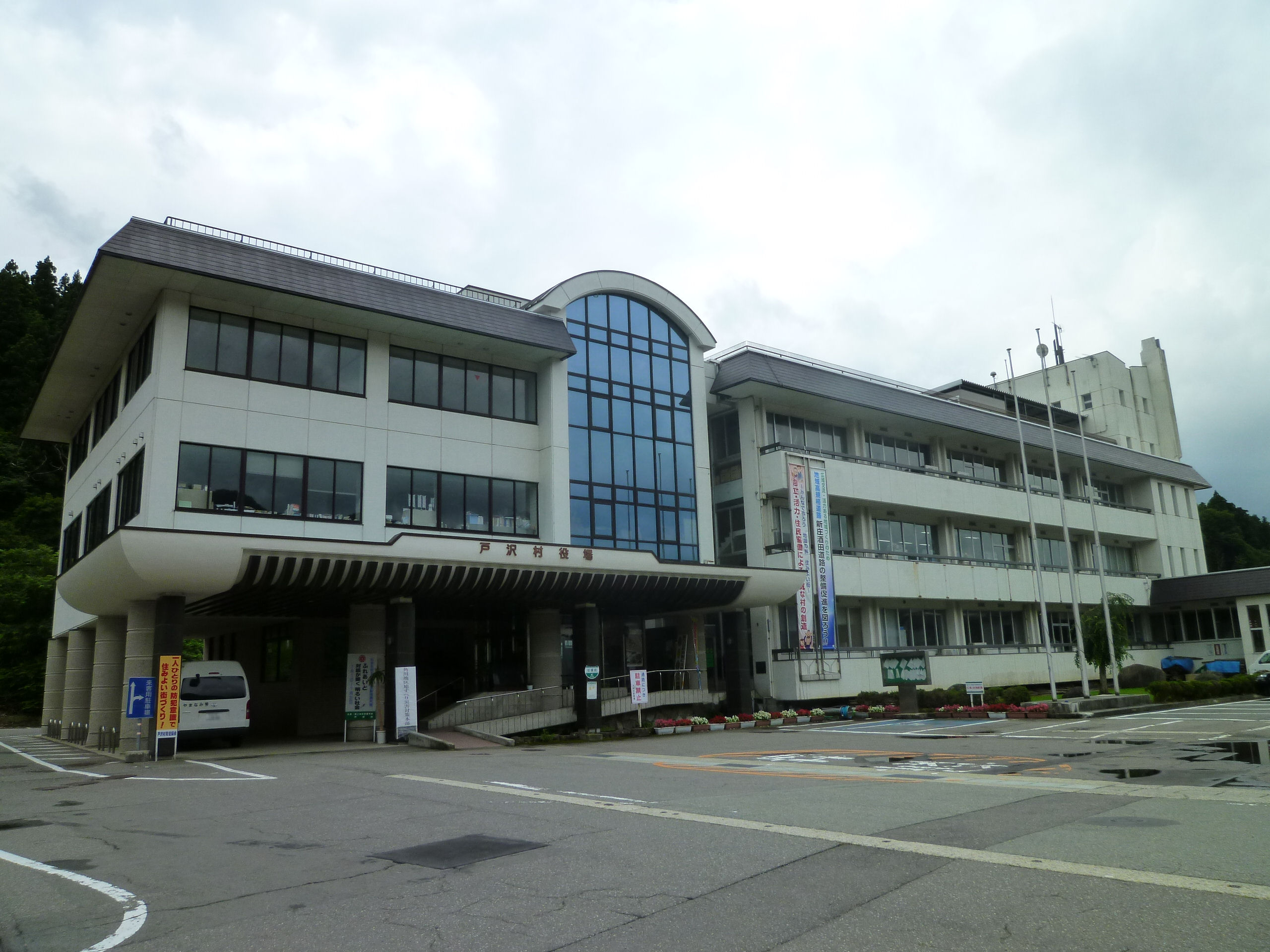
- Tozawa Village Hall

- Flag Seal
- Location of Tozawa in Yamagata Prefecture

- Coordinates: 38°44′16″N 140°08′37″E
- Country: Japan
- Region: Tōhoku
- Prefecture: Yamagata
- District: Mogami

Area
  - Total: 261.31 km^{2} (100.89 sq mi)

Population (March 31, 2023)
  - Total: 4,042
  - Density: 15.47/km^{2} (40.06/sq mi)
- Time zone: UTC+9 (Japan Standard Time)
- City hall address: 270 Furukuchi, Tozawa-mura, Mogami-gun, Yamagata-ken 999-6401
- Phone number: 0233-72-2111
- Climate: Cfa
- Website: Official website
- Symbols
- Flower: Lilium rubellum
- Tree: Cryptomeria japonica

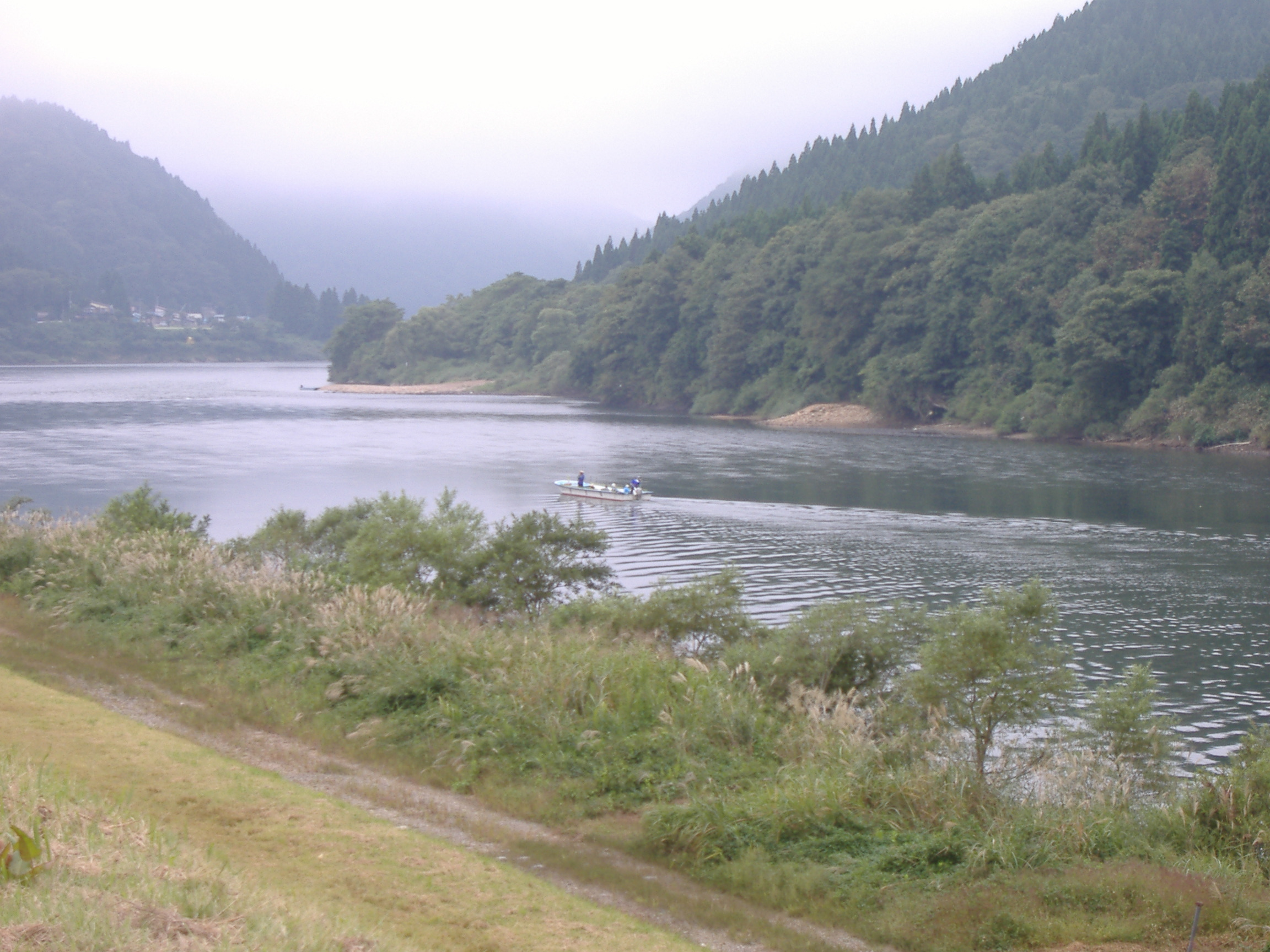
Mogami River at Tozawa

Tozawa (戸沢村, Tozawa-mura) is a village located in Yamagata Prefecture, Japan. As of 31 March 2023, the village had an estimated population of 4,042 in 1492 households, and a population density of 17 persons per km^{2}. The total area of the village is 261.31 square kilometres (101 sq mi).

== Geography ==
Tozawa is located in north-central eastern Yamagata Prefecture. To the west of the village is the Dewa Mountains, and to east is the Shinjo Basin. The Mogami River runs westward through the center of the village.

=== Neighboring municipalities ===
Yamagata Prefecture

- Ōkura
- Sakata
- Sakegawa
- Shinjō
- Shōnai

=== Climate ===
Tozawa has a humid continental climate (Köppen climate classification Cfa) with large seasonal temperature differences, with warm to hot (and often humid) summers and cold (sometimes severely cold) winters. Precipitation is significant throughout the year, but is heaviest from August to October. The average annual temperature in Tozawa is 11.1 °C. The average annual rainfall is 1877 mm with September as the wettest month. The temperatures are highest on average in August, at around 24.6 °C, and lowest in January, at around -1.1 °C.

== History ==
The area of present-day was Tozawa part of ancient Dewa Province and during the Nara Period and early Heian period was an important fortified point on the road connecting Akita Castle on the Sea of Japan with Tagajo on the Pacific Ocean. During the Sengoku period, the area was under the control of the Mogami clan. During the Edo period, the village was a river port on the Mogami River. After the start of the Meiji period, the area became part of Mogami District, Yamagata Prefecture. The village of Tozawa was established on April 1, 1889 with the establishment of the modern municipalities system. It absorbed the neighboring villages of Furukuchi and Kadokawa in 1955.

== Demographics ==
Per Japanese census data, the population of Tozawa peaked around the year 1950 and has declined since then. It is now less than half what it was a century ago.

Historical population
Year	Pop.	±% p.a.
1920	8,601	—
1930	9,144	+0.61%
1940	9,283	+0.15%
1950	11,454	+2.12%
1960	10,479	−0.89%
1970	8,600	−1.96%
1980	7,601	−1.23%
1990	7,248	−0.47%
2000	6,450	−1.16%
2010	5,304	−1.94%
2020	4,199	−2.31%

== Economy ==
The main industry is agriculture, livestock and forestry.

== Education ==
Tozawa has one combined public elementary/middle school operated by the village government. The village does not have a high school.

== Transportation ==
=== Railways ===
East Japan Railway Company - Rikuu West Line

- Tsuya - Furukuchi - Takaya

=== Highways ===
- National Route 47

== Local attractions ==
- Shiraito Falls – one of Japan's Top 100 Waterfalls

== Sister cities ==
- General Trias, Cavite, Philippines
