= Ōkura, Yamagata =

Ōkura 大蔵村
- Village
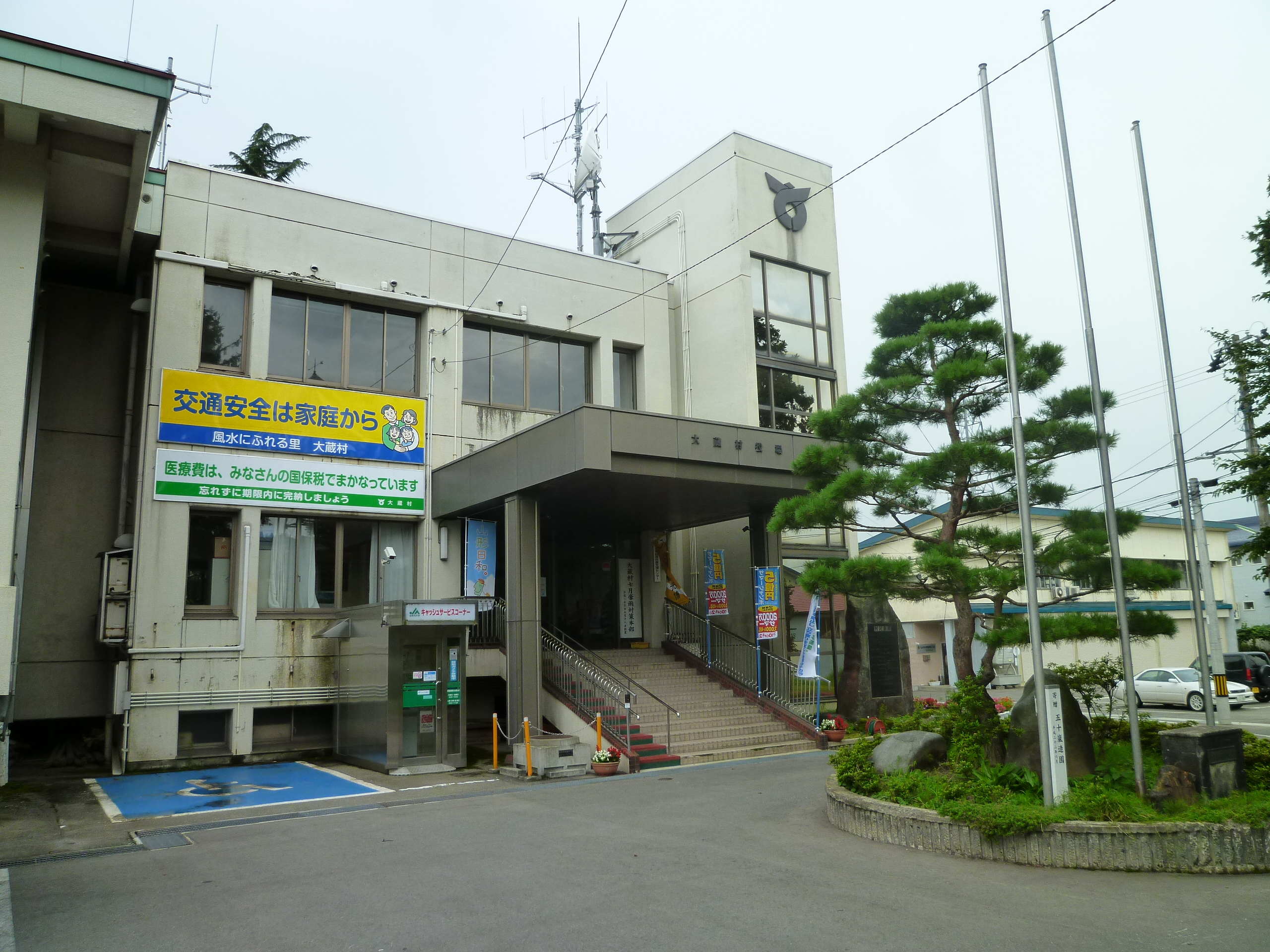
- Ōkura Village Hall

- Flag Seal

- Location of Ōkura in Yamagata Prefecture

- Coordinates: 38°42′14.8″N 140°13′49.3″E
- Country: Japan
- Region: Tōhoku
- Prefecture: Yamagata
- District: Mogami

Area
  - Total: 211.59 km^{2} (81.70 sq mi)

Population (January 2020)
  - Total: 3,044
  - Density: 14.39/km^{2} (37.26/sq mi)
- Time zone: UTC+9 (Japan Standard Time)
- Phone number: 0233-75-2111
- Address: 2528 Kiyomizu, Ōkura-mura, Mogami-gun, Yamagata-ken 999-0212
- Climate: Cfb/Dfb
- Website: Official website
- Symbols
- Bird: Copper pheasant
- Flower: Japanese gentian
- Tree: Japanese beech

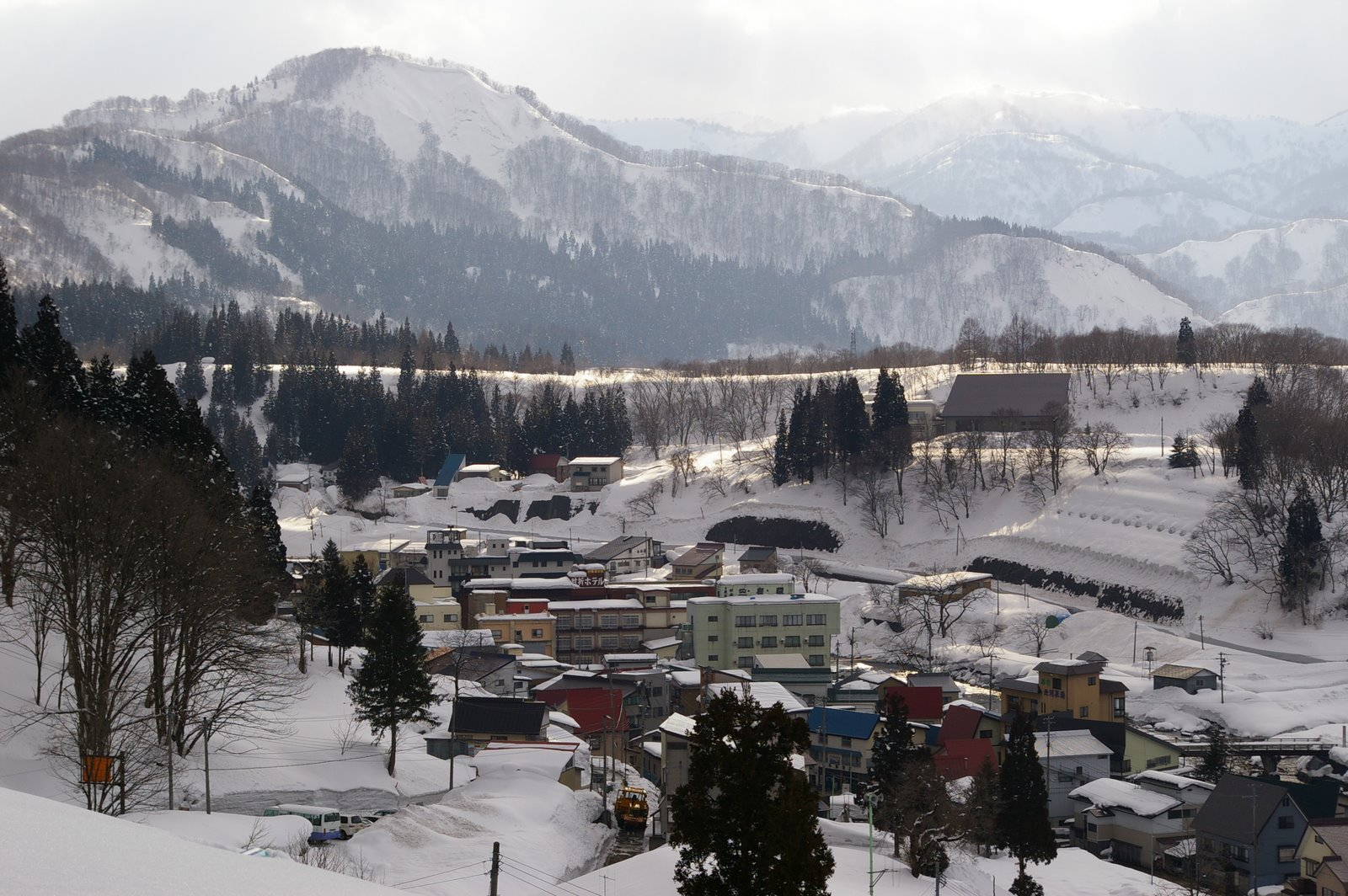
Hijiri onsen in Ōkura

Ōkura (大蔵村, Ōkura-mura) is a village in Yamagata Prefecture, Japan. As of January 2020, the village has an estimated population of 3044, and a population density of 14 persons per km^{2}. The total area is 211.59 square kilometres (82 sq mi).

== Geography ==
Ōkura is located in a mountainous north-central eastern Yamagata Prefecture, and includes Mount Gassan within its borders. The Mogami River runs through the village. The area is known for extremely heavy snows in winter. Its highest accumulation of snow recorded is 414 cm, second place in Japan after Sukayu Onsen in Aomori. Snow typically starts in November, and starts piling up on the ground by early December. The snow will usually stop by early May, but will not completely melt until mid-June. Similar to Sukayu Onsen, snowfalls of 50 to 100 cm in a single day are not uncommon at all.

=== Neighboring municipalities ===
- Yamagata Prefecture
  - Funagata
  - Murayama
  - Nishikawa
  - Sagae
  - Shinjō
  - Shōnai
  - Tozawa

=== Climate ===
Ōkura has a humid continental climate (Köppen climate classification Cfa) with large seasonal temperature differences, with warm to hot (and often humid) summers and cold (sometimes severely cold) winters. Precipitation is significant throughout the year, but is heaviest from August to October. The average annual temperature in Ōkura is 9.2 °C (48.6 °F). The average annual rainfall is 2,844.8 mm (112.00 in) with December as the wettest month. The temperatures are highest on average in August, at around 21.9 °C (71.4 °F), and lowest in January, at around −1.8 °C (28.8 °F).

Climate data for Hijiori Onsen, Ōkura, elevation 330 m (1,080 ft), (1991−2020 normals, extremes 1976−present)
Month	Jan	Feb	Mar	Apr	May	Jun	Jul	Aug	Sep	Oct	Nov	Dec	Year
Record high °C (°F)	11.8 (53.2)	17.3 (63.1)	18.2 (64.8)	26.3 (79.3)	30.4 (86.7)	30.5 (86.9)	33.4 (92.1)	35.3 (95.5)	32.4 (90.3)	27.4 (81.3)	21.9 (71.4)	17.7 (63.9)	35.3 (95.5)
Mean daily maximum °C (°F)	1.1 (34.0)	1.8 (35.2)	5.4 (41.7)	11.7 (53.1)	19.1 (66.4)	22.7 (72.9)	25.7 (78.3)	27.1 (80.8)	23.0 (73.4)	16.9 (62.4)	10.4 (50.7)	3.8 (38.8)	14.1 (57.3)
Daily mean °C (°F)	−1.8 (28.8)	−1.6 (29.1)	1.1 (34.0)	5.6 (42.1)	12.0 (53.6)	17.0 (62.6)	20.9 (69.6)	21.9 (71.4)	17.8 (64.0)	11.5 (52.7)	5.5 (41.9)	0.5 (32.9)	9.2 (48.6)
Mean daily minimum °C (°F)	−4.6 (23.7)	−5.1 (22.8)	−2.9 (26.8)	0.5 (32.9)	5.5 (41.9)	11.6 (52.9)	16.8 (62.2)	17.5 (63.5)	13.3 (55.9)	6.7 (44.1)	1.3 (34.3)	−2.3 (27.9)	4.9 (40.7)
Record low °C (°F)	−16.1 (3.0)	−16.6 (2.1)	−22.9 (−9.2)	−11.1 (12.0)	−2.5 (27.5)	2.0 (35.6)	6.7 (44.1)	8.2 (46.8)	2.3 (36.1)	−2.7 (27.1)	−8.0 (17.6)	−13.9 (7.0)	−22.9 (−9.2)
Average precipitation mm (inches)	403.3 (15.88)	268.4 (10.57)	186.4 (7.34)	128.4 (5.06)	112.4 (4.43)	135.0 (5.31)	229.2 (9.02)	201.5 (7.93)	170.6 (6.72)	222.0 (8.74)	332.5 (13.09)	443.8 (17.47)	2,844.8 (112.00)
Average snowfall cm (inches)	459 (181)	343 (135)	212 (83)	80 (31)	13 (5.1)	0 (0)	0 (0)	0 (0)	0 (0)	0 (0)	49 (19)	325 (128)	1,469 (578)
Average extreme snow depth cm (inches)	266 (105)	321 (126)	292 (115)	211 (83)	39 (15)	0 (0)	0 (0)	0 (0)	0 (0)	0 (0)	27 (11)	141 (56)	321 (126)
Average precipitation days (≥ 1.0 mm)	26.7	22.7	20.7	14.7	12.4	11.4	14.7	13.2	14.2	16.4	20.1	25.5	212.7
Average snowy days (≥ 3 cm)	24.1	20.0	17.1	12.2	2.1	0	0	0	0	0	3.6	18.7	97.8
Mean monthly sunshine hours	20.7	37.7	75.9	149.5	191.4	150.0	119.6	153.7	115.4	103.7	74.5	31.3	1,223.5
Source: Japan Meteorological Agency

== Demographics ==
Per Japanese census data, the population of Ōkura peaked around 1950 and is now considerably less than it was a century ago.

Historical population
Year	Pop.	±%
1920	8,156	—
1930	7,486	−8.2%
1940	7,797	+4.2%
1950	9,015	+15.6%
1960	8,434	−6.4%
1970	6,080	−27.9%
1980	5,301	−12.8%
1990	4,982	−6.0%
2000	4,528	−9.1%
2010	3,762	−16.9%
2020	3,028	−19.5%

== History ==
The area of present-day Ōkura was part of ancient Dewa Province. During the Sengoku period, the area was under the control of the Mogami clan. During the Edo period, the village was a river port on the Mogami River and a post station on the pilgrimage route to Mount Gassan. After the start of the Meiji period, the area became part of Mogami District, Yamagata Prefecture. The village of Ōkura was established on April 1, 1889, with the establishment of the modern municipalities system.

== Economy ==
The main industry is agriculture (tomato and buckwheat), sake production, and seasonal tourism to its hot spring resorts. Kokeshi dolls are a noted local handicraft.

== Education ==
Ōkura has one public elementary school and one public middle school operated by the village government. The village does not have a high school.

== Transportation ==
=== Railways ===
Ōkura does not have any passenger railway service.

=== Highways ===
- National Route 458

== Local attractions ==
- Hijiori Hot Springs
- Shimizu Castle Ruins
