= Uzen-Toyosato Station =

Railway station in Sakegawa, Yamagata Prefecture, Japan

Uzen-Toyosato Station 羽前豊里駅
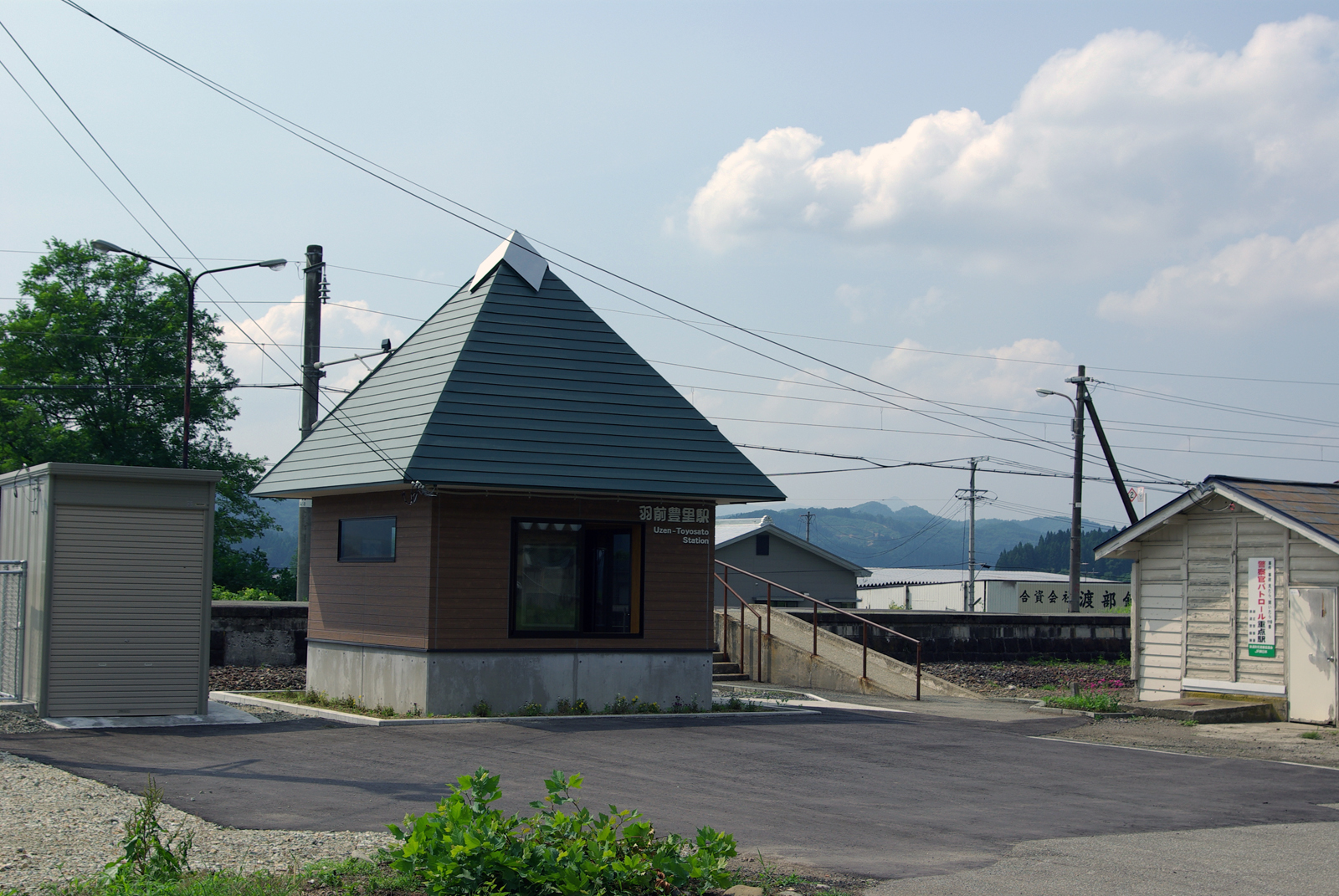
- Uzen-Toyosato Station building, July 2009

General information
- Location: Ishinazaka, Sakegawa-mura, Mogami-gun, Yamagata-ken 999-5208; Japan
- Coordinates: 38°50′12″N 140°14′32″E
- Operator: JR East
- Line: ■ Ōu Main Line
- Distance: 161.3 kilometers from Fukushima
- Platforms: 1 side platform

Other information
- Status: Unstaffed
- Website: Official website

History
- Opened: December 15, 1921

Services
| Preceding station | JR East | Following station |
|---|---|---|
| Izumita towards Shinjō | Ōu Main Line Local | Mamurogawa towards Aomori |
Location
- Location within Yamagata Prefecture Location within Japan

Uzen-Toyosato Station (羽前豊里駅, Uzen-Toyosato-eki) is a railway station in the village of Sakegawa, Yamagata, Japan, operated by East Japan Railway Company (JR East).

== Lines ==
Uzen-Toyosato Station is served by the Ōu Main Line, and is located 161.3 rail kilometers from the terminus of the line at Fukushima Station.

== Station layout ==
The station has one side platform serving a single bidirectional track. The station is unattended.

== History ==
Uzen-Toyosato Station opened on December 15, 1921. The station was absorbed into the JR East network upon the privatization of JNR on April 1, 1987. A new station building was completed in April 2009.

== Surrounding area ==
- Sakegawa River

== See also ==
- List of railway stations in Japan
