= Kamabuchi Station =

Railway station in Mamurogawa, Yamagata Prefecture, Japan

Kamabuchi Station 釜淵駅
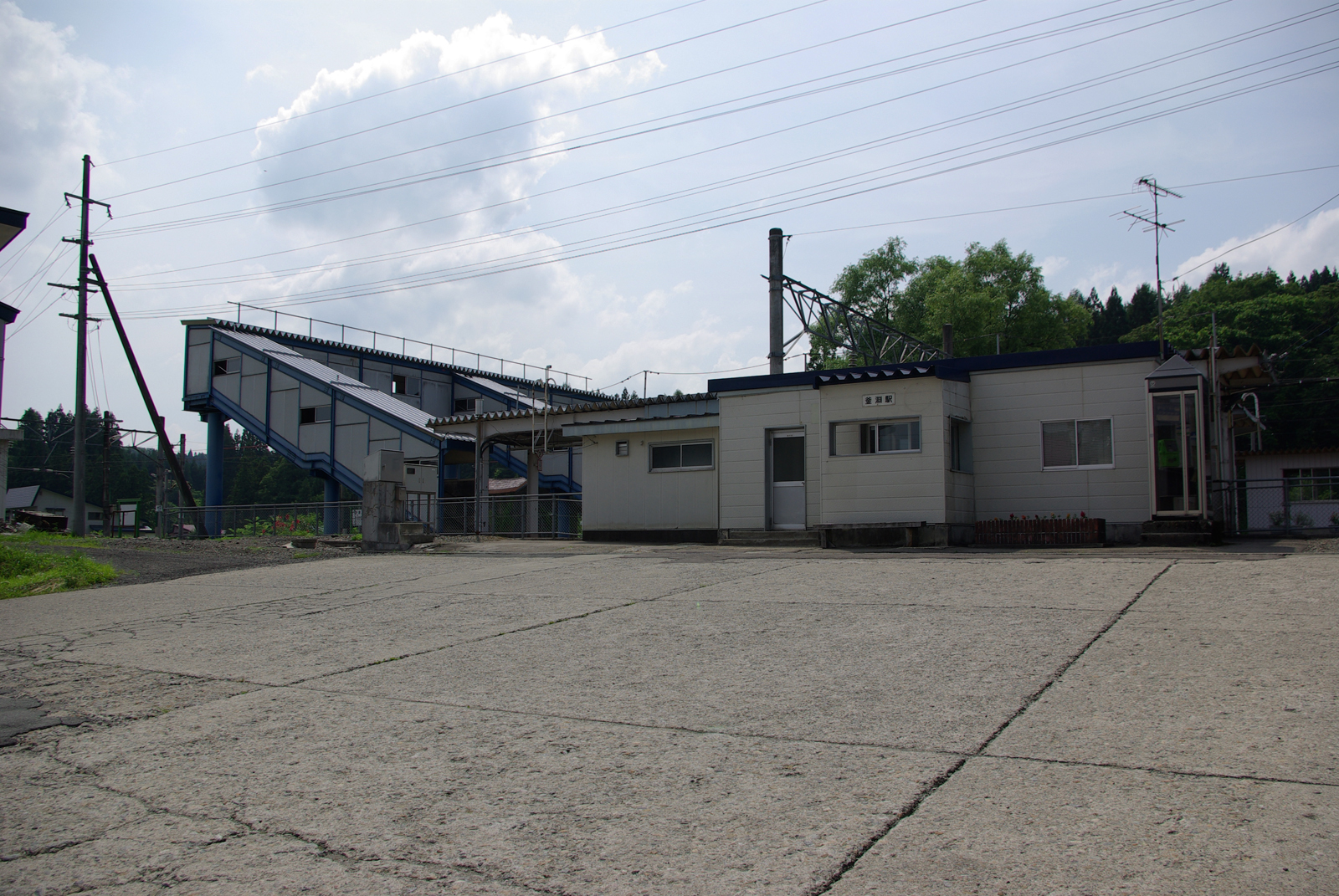
- Kamabuchi Station building, July 2009

General information
- Location: Kamabuchi, Mamurogawa-machi, Mogami-gun, Yamagata-ken; Japan
- Coordinates: 38°55′59″N 140°15′50″E
- Operator: JR East
- Line: ■ Ōu Main Line
- Distance: 173.2 kilometers from Fukushima
- Platforms: 2 side platforms

Other information
- Status: Unstaffed
- Website: Official website

History
- Opened: October 21, 1904

Passengers
- FY2004: 100

Services
Preceding station	JR East	Following station
Mamurogawa towards Shinjō	Ōu Main Line Local	Ōtaki towards Aomori
Location
- Location within Yamagata Prefecture Location within Japan

Kamabuchi Station (釜淵駅, Kamabuchi-eki) is a railway station in the town of Mamurogawa, Yamagata, Japan, operated by the East Japan Railway Company (JR East).

== Lines ==
Kamabuchi Station is served by the Ōu Main Line, and is located 173.2 rail kilometers from the terminus of the line at Fukushima Station.

== Station layout ==
The station has a two opposed side platforms, connected by a footbridge. The station is unattended.

=== Platforms ===
1	■ Ōu Main Line	for Yokote, Yuzawa, and Akita
2	■ Ōu Main Line	for Shinjō

== History ==
Kamabuchi Station opened on October 21, 1904. The station was absorbed into the JR East network upon the privatization of JNR on April 1, 1987.

== Surrounding area ==
- Kamabuchi Post Office
- Mamurogawa River

== See also ==
- List of railway stations in Japan
