= Mamurogawa Station =

Railway station in Mamurogawa, Yamagata Prefecture, Japan

Mamurogawa Station 真室川駅
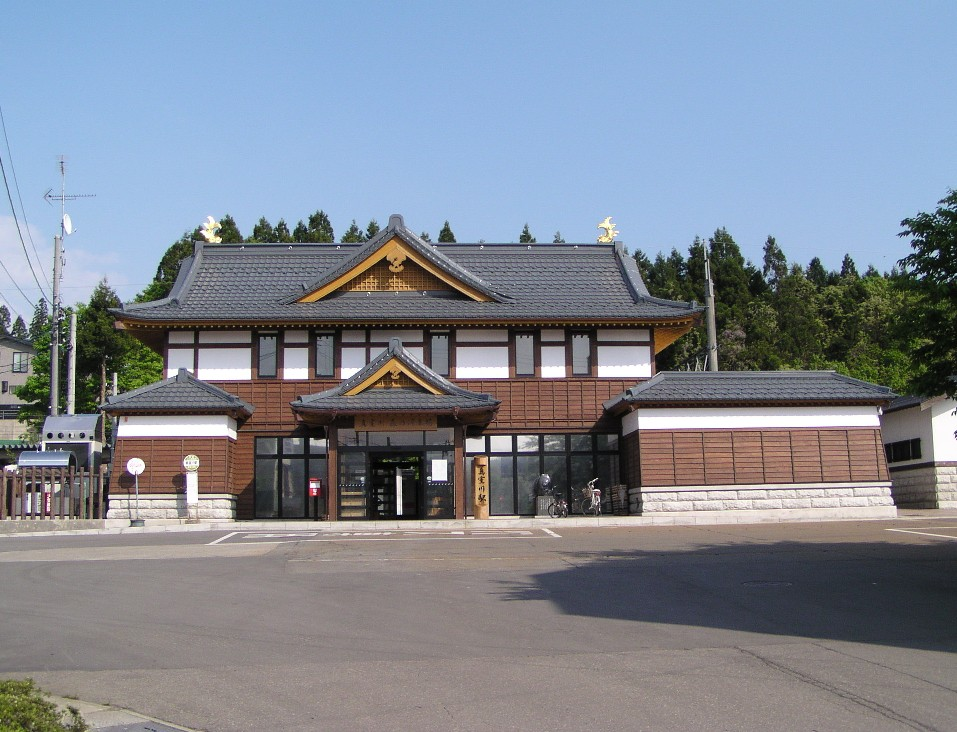
- Mamurogawa Station in 2005

General information
- Location: Ōaza Shimmachi, Mamurogawa-machi, Mogami-gun, Yamagata-ken; Japan
- Coordinates: 38°51′30″N 140°15′17″E
- Operator: JR East
- Line: ■ Ōu Main Line
- Distance: 164.0 kilometers from Fukushima
- Platforms: 1 island + 1 side platform

Other information
- Status: Staffed
- Website: Official website

History
- Opened: October 21, 1904
- Former names: Aramachi (until 1916)

Passengers
- FY2018: 118

Services
Preceding station	JR East	Following station
Uzen-Toyosato towards Shinjō	Ōu Main Line Local	Kamabuchi towards Aomori
Location
- Location within Yamagata Prefecture Location within Japan

Mamurogawa Station (真室川駅, Mamurogawa-eki) is a railway station located in the town of Mamurogawa, Yamagata Prefecture, Japan, operated by the East Japan Railway Company (|JR East).

== Lines ==
Mamurogawa Station is served by the Ōu Main Line, and is located 164.0 rail kilometers from the terminus of the line at Fukushima Station.

== Station layout ==
The station has one side platform and one island platform, connected by a footbridge. The station is staffed.

=== Platforms ===
1	■ Ōu Main Line	for Yokote, Yuzawa and Akita
2	■ Ōu Main Line	for Shinjō
2	■ Ōu Main Line	for trains originating at Mamurogawa

== History ==
Mamurogawa Station opened on October 21, 1904 as Aramachi Station (新町駅, Aramachi eki) on the Japanese Government Railways (JGR). It was renamed to its present name on September 20, 1916. The JGR became the Japan National Railways (JNR) after World War II. The station was absorbed into the JR East network upon the privatization of the JNR on April 1, 1987. A new station building was completed in December 2003.

== Passenger statistics ==
In fiscal 2018, the station was used by an average of 118 passengers daily (boarding passengers only).

== Surrounding area ==
- Japan National Route 344
- Mamorugawa Post Office
- ruins of Sakenobe Castle

== See also ==
- List of railway stations in Japan
