= Shiraito Falls (Yamagata) =

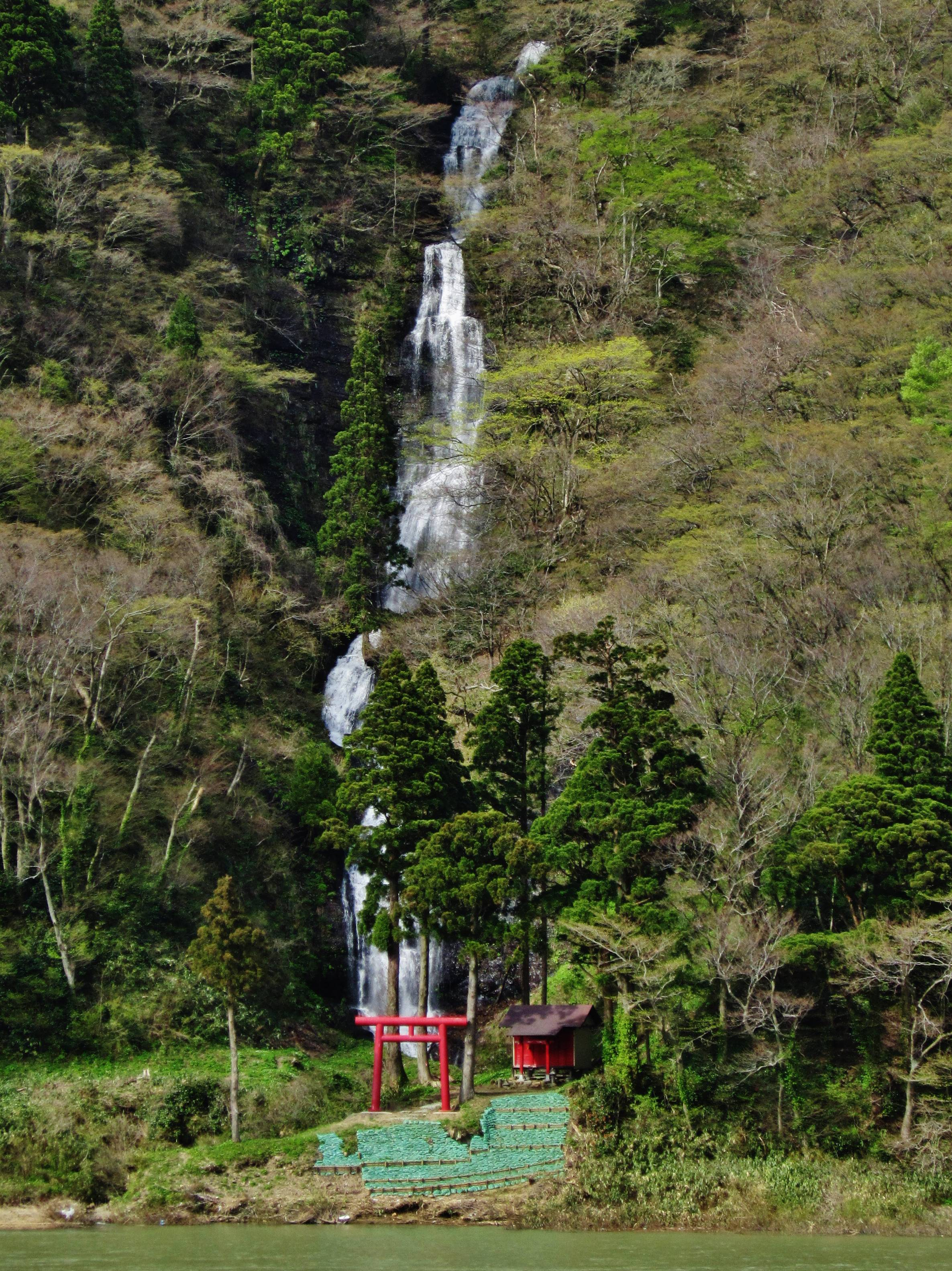

- Location within Japan
- Location: Tozawa, Yamagata Prefecture, Japan
- Coordinates: 38°45′56″N 140°3′22″E
- Type: Ribbon cascade
- Total height: 120 m (390 ft)
- Watercourse: Mogami River

Shiraito Falls (白糸の滝, Shiraito-no-taki) is a waterfall in the Furukuchi district of Tozawa, Yamagata Prefecture, Japan, on a branch of the Mogami River. It is one of "Japan’s Top 100 Waterfalls", in a listing published by the Japanese Ministry of the Environment in 1990.

The Mogami River passes through the Mogami Gorge, dropping from 500 to 300 metres (1,640 to 980 ft) in altitude with a series of 48 waterfalls, of which the Shiraito Falls is the largest. At the base of the falls is a small chapel dedicated to Fudo Myoo and the Kusanagi Hot Springs are located nearby.

The site has a long history in Japanese literature, being featured in writings such as the Gikeiki and Oku no Hosomichi.
