= Shinjō Tozawa clan cemetery =

Cemetery in Yamagata Prefecture, Japan

Shinjō Domain Tozawa clan cemetery
- 新庄藩主戸沢家墓所
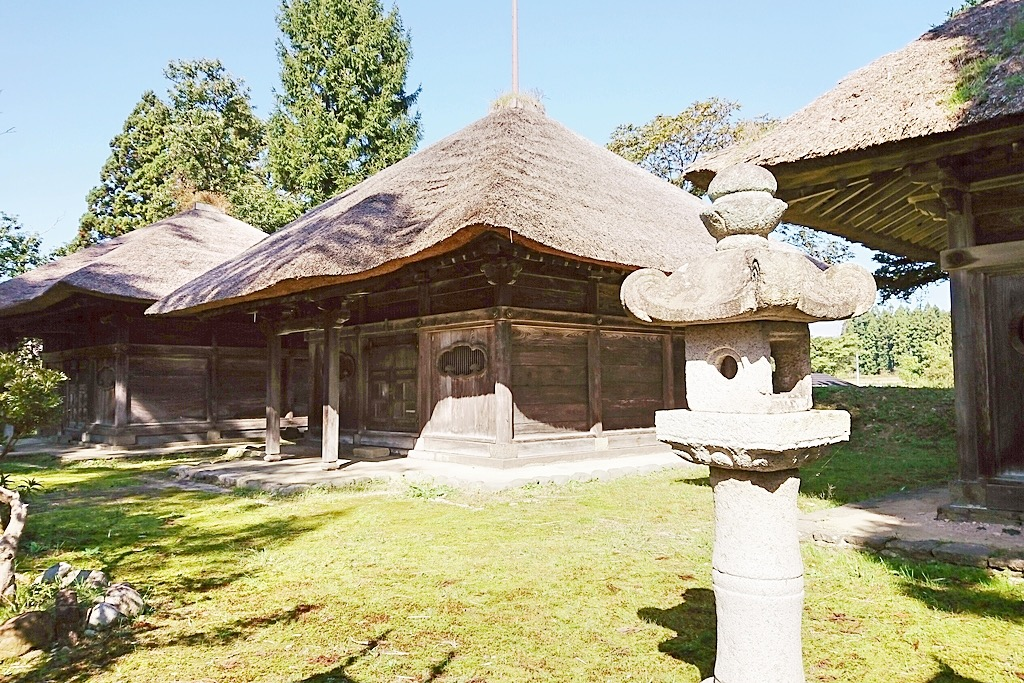
- Tozawa clan cemetery
- Interactive map of Shinjō Domain Tozawa clan cemetery

Details
- Established: 1648
- Location: Shinjō, Yamagata
- Country: Japan
- Coordinates: 38°46′49″N 140°18′24″E
- Type: daimyō cemetery
- Footnotes: National Historic Site of Japan

The Shinjō Domain Tozawa clan cemetery (新庄藩主戸沢家墓所, Shinjō-han-shu Tozawa-ke bosho) is located in the city of Shinjō, Yamagata, Japan The cemetery contains the graves of the successive daimyō of Shinjō Domain over a 180-year period. The cemetery was designated a National Historic Site in 1987.

== Overview ==
The Tozawa clan ruled portions of Mutsu Province form the Kamakura period, and after being forced into Dewa Province during the Nanboku-chō period, ruled an estate near what is now Kakunodate, Akita through the Muromachi period and into the Sengoku period. Faced with powerful and aggressive neighbors, the Tozawa clan was quick to pledge support to Toyotomi Hideyoshi and was confirmed in their holdings of 45,000 koku. Tozawa Masamori was lukewarm in his support of Tokugawa Ieyasu at the time of the Battle of Sekigahara and was relocated to Hitachi Province for a period, but through the efforts of his father-in-law, Torii Tadamasa, he was admitted to the ranks of the fudai daimyō and allowed to return to Dewa Province as daimyō of the 60,000 koku Shinjō Domain in 1622. On his death in 1648, his grave was built at the clan's bodaiji of Zuiun-in in Shinjō. This was the start of the clan cemetery which would grow to house the graves and memorial chapels of all 11 generations daimyō of Shinjō, with the exception of the 2nd daimyō, Tozawa Masanobu, whose grave is at the temple of Keiryu-ji, which is immediately adjacent.

The cemetery is surrounded by an earthen wall, and contains six memorial chapels (seven counting the one at Keiryu-ji), made of keyaki wood, with thatch roofs. Each chapel has a cobblestone floor, and is unique among daimyō cemeteries in that each contains several tombs. In total there are 27 tombs: eleven daimyō, six official wives, one concubine, and nine others. Of the "nine others", four are the children of 9th daimyō, Tozawa Masatane. Only eleven of the tombs are for people who died in Shinjō; the others died in Edo and were buried at the clan's Edo bodaiji of Jōrin-ji in Mita, in which cases a portion of their ashes and/or a lock of hair was returned to Shinjō. These chapels were built over a one hundred-year period from 1704 to 1798, and give a unique example on the changes in Edo period mortuary architecture over this time.

The temple of Zuiun-in belongs to the Sōtō sect of Japanese Zen and was originally located on the northern side of the castle town. It burned down in 1701 and was relocated to the east side of the town in 1706. The temple of Keiyu-ji belongs to the Myōshin-ji-branch of the Rinzai school of Zen and was brought to its present location in 1686.

The cemetery is located about 30 minutes on foot from Shinjō Station on the Yamagata Shinkansen.

== See also ==
- List of Historic Sites of Japan (Yamagata)
