= Izumita Station =

Railway station in Shinjō, Yamagata Prefecture, Japan

Izumita Station 泉田駅
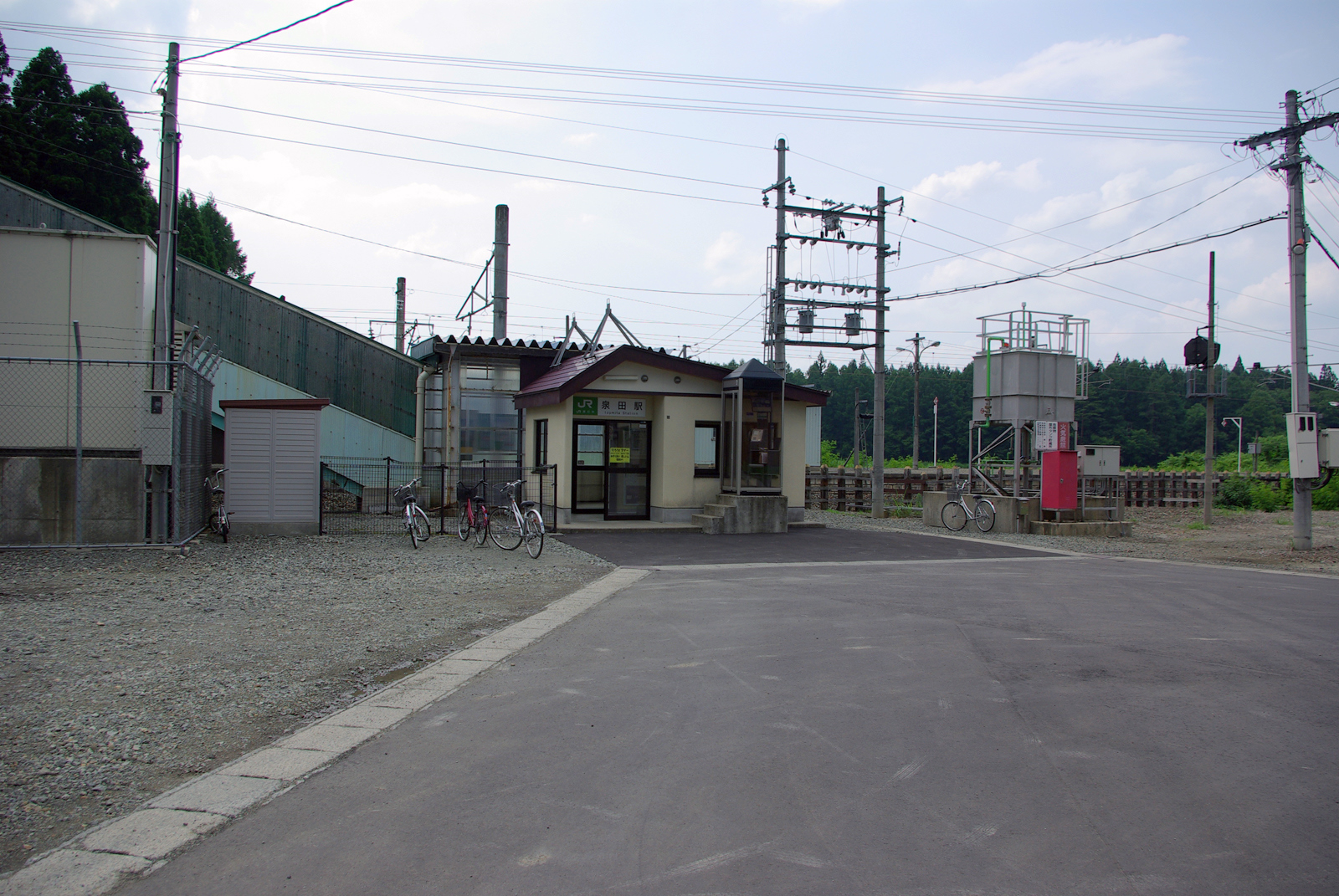
- Izumita Station building, July 2009

General information
- Location: 2244 Izumita, Shinjō-shi, Yamagata-ken 999-5103; Japan
- Coordinates: 38°48′42″N 140°18′37″E
- Operator: JR East
- Line: ■ Ōu Main Line
- Distance: 154.2 km from Fukushima
- Platforms: 1 island platform

Other information
- Status: Unstaffed
- Website: Official website

History
- Opened: July 15, 1913

Passengers
- FY2004: 33

Services
Preceding station	JR East	Following station
Shinjō Terminus	Ōu Main Line Local	Uzen-Toyosato towards Aomori
Location
- Location within Yamagata Prefecture Location within Japan

Izumita Station (泉田駅, Izumita-eki) is a railway station located in the city of Shinjō, Yamagata Prefecture, Japan, operated by the East Japan Railway Company (JR East).

== Lines ==
Izumita Station is served by the Ōu Main Line and is located 154.2 rail kilometers from the terminus of the line at Fukushima Station.

== Station layout ==
The station has a single island platform, connected to the station by a footbridge. The station is unattended.

=== Platforms ===
1	■ Ōu Main Line	for Shinjō
2	■ Ōu Main Line	for Yuzawa, Yokote and Akita

== History ==
Izumita Station opened on July 15, 1913. The station was absorbed into the JR East network upon the privatization of the JNR on April 1, 1987. A new station building was completed in March 2000.

== Surrounding area ==
- National Route 13
- Izumita Post Office

== See also ==
- List of railway stations in Japan
