= Ōtaki Station (Yamagata) =

Railway station in Mamurogawa, Yamagata Prefecture, Japan

Ōtaki Station 大滝駅
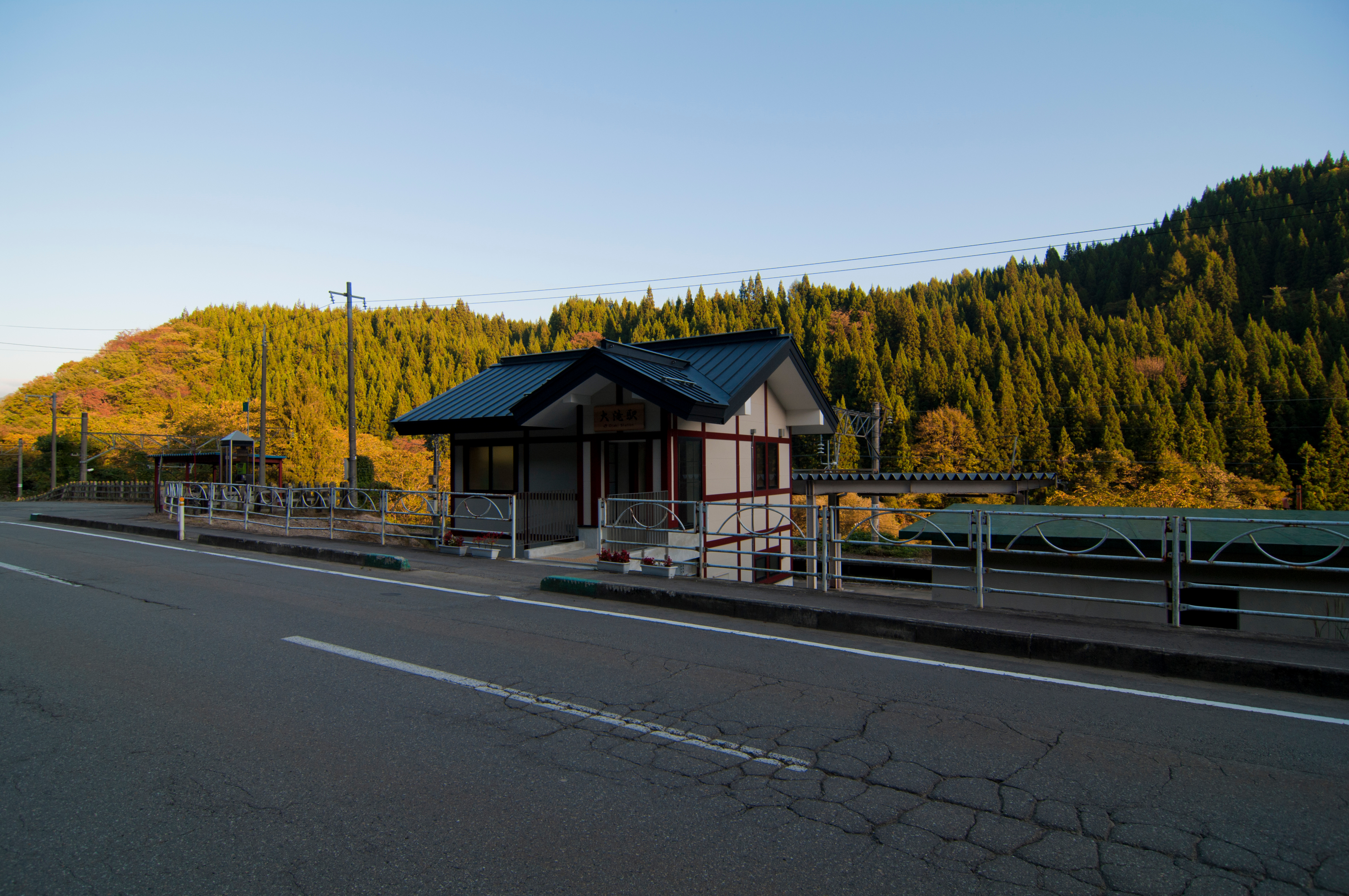
- Ōtaki Station building, October 2010

General information
- Location: Ōtaki, Mamurogawa-machi, Mogami-gun, Yamagata-ken; Japan
- Coordinates: 38°58′17″N 140°19′12″E
- Operator: JR East
- Line: ■ Ōu Main Line
- Distance: 180.3 kilometers from Fukushima
- Platforms: 1 side platform

Other information
- Status: Unstaffed
- Website: Official website

History
- Opened: October 21, 1904

Passengers
- FY2004: 51

Services
Preceding station	JR East	Following station
Kamabuchi towards Shinjō	Ōu Main Line Local	Innai towards Aomori
Location
- Location within Yamagata Prefecture Location within Japan

Ōtaki Station (大滝駅, Ōtaki-eki) is a railway station in the town of Mamurogawa, Yamagata, Japan, operated by East Japan Railway Company (JR East).

== Lines ==
Ōtaki Station is served by the Ōu Main Line, and is located 180.3 rail kilometers from the terminus of the line at Fukushima Station.

== Station layout ==
The station has a single side platform serving one bi-directional track. The station is built in a gorge, with a two-story station building. The station faces the road on its upper floor, with the train platform connected to the station building on its lower floor. The station formerly also had an island platform, which has been removed, although the connecting footbridge remains. The station is unattended.

== History ==
Ōtaki Station opened on September 20, 1941. The station was absorbed into the JR East network upon the privatization of JNR on April 1, 1987. A new station building was completed in March 2010.

== Surrounding area ==
- Yamagata Prefectural Route 13

== See also ==
- List of railway stations in Japan
