= Sakegawa =

Sakegawa 鮭川村
- Village
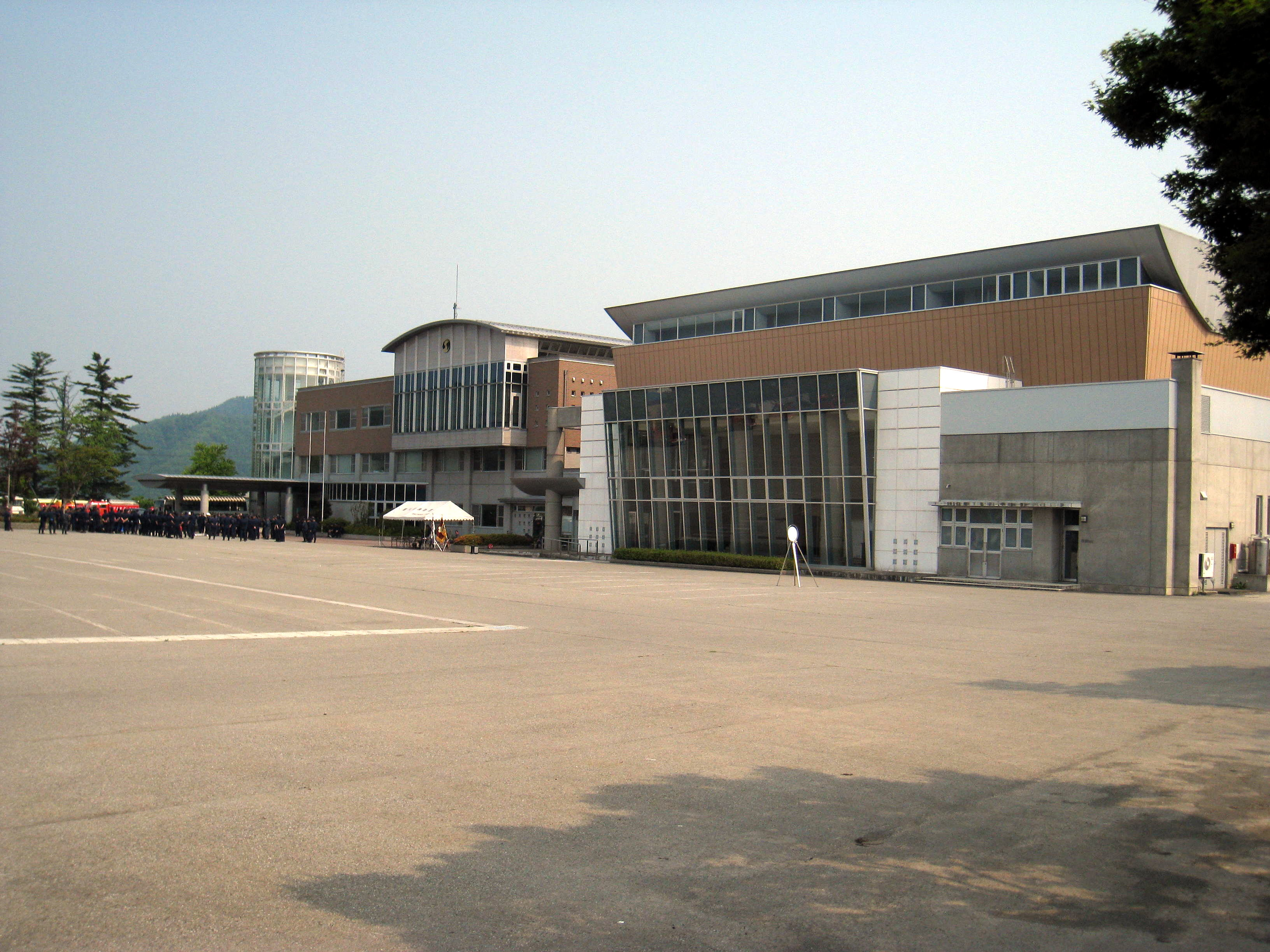
- Sakegawa Village Hall

- Flag Seal
- Location of Sakegawa in Yamagata Prefecture

- Coordinates: 38°47′47.2″N 140°13′18.6″E
- Country: Japan
- Region: Tōhoku
- Prefecture: Yamagata
- District: Mogami

Area
  - Total: 122.14 km^{2} (47.16 sq mi)

Population (March 31, 2023)
  - Total: 3,843
  - Density: 31.46/km^{2} (81.49/sq mi)
- Time zone: UTC+9 (Japan Standard Time)
- Phone number: 0233-55-2111
- Address: 2003-7 Sado, Sakegawa-mura, Mogami-gun, Yamagata-ken 999-5202
- Website: Official website
- Symbols
- Flower: Lily
- Tree: Maple

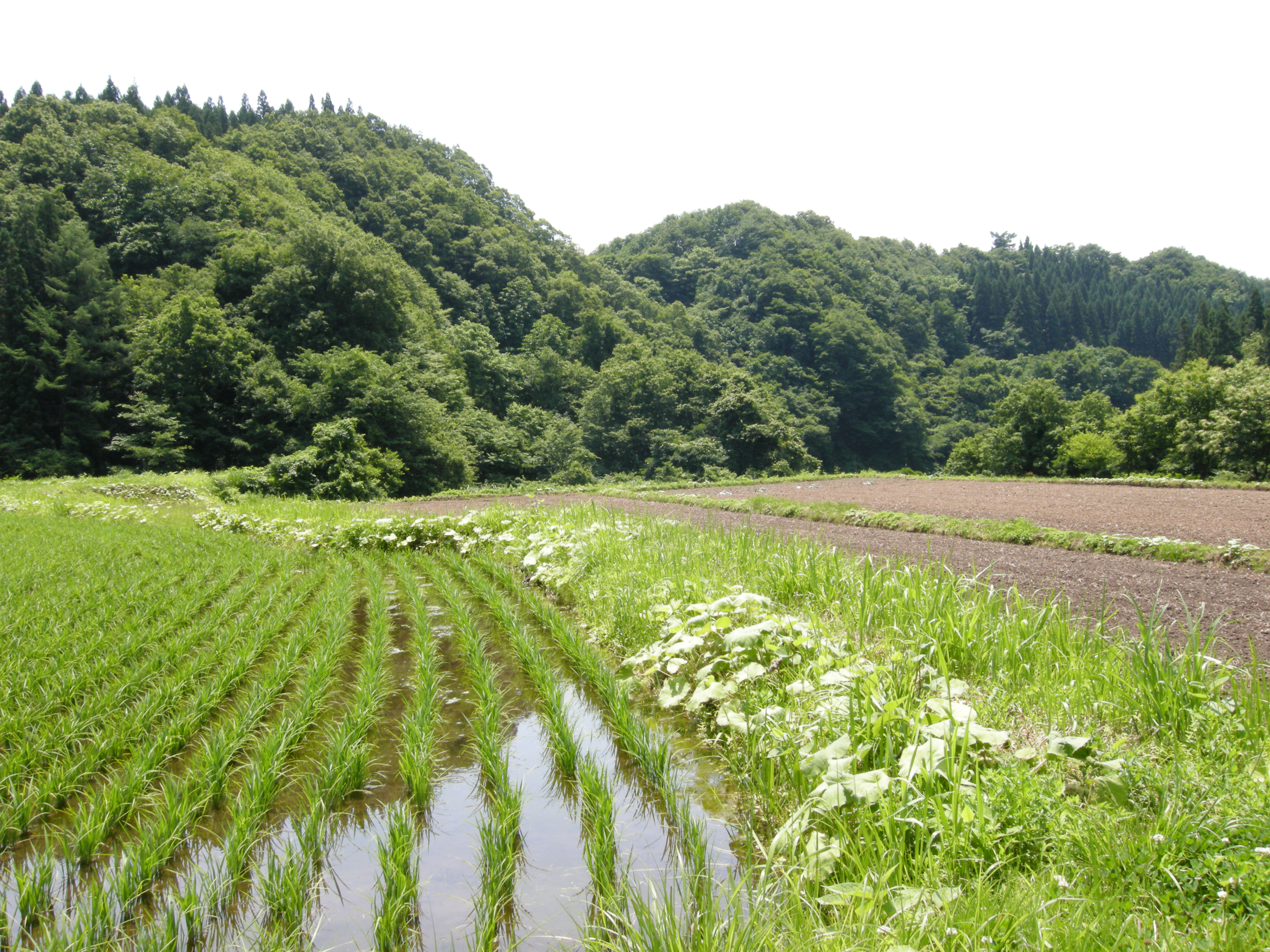
Rice paddies in Sakegawa

Sakegawa (鮭川村, Sakegawa-mura) is a village located in Yamagata Prefecture, Japan. As of 31 March 2023, the village had an estimated population of 3843 in 1329 households, and a population density of 31 persons per km^{2}. The total area of the village is 122.15 square kilometres (47 sq mi).

== Geography ==
Sakegawa is located in northern Yamagata Prefecture, bordered to the west by the Dewa Mountains. The area is known for its heavy snowfalls in winter.

=== Neighboring municipalities ===
Yamagata Prefecture

- Mamurogawa
- Sakata
- Shinjō
- Tozawa

=== Climate ===
Sakegawa has a humid continental climate (Köppen climate classification Cfa) with large seasonal temperature differences, with warm to hot (and often humid) summers and cold (sometimes severely cold) winters. Precipitation is significant throughout the year, but is heaviest from August to October. The average annual temperature in Sakegawa is 10.6 °C. The average annual rainfall is 1902 mm with September as the wettest month. The temperatures are highest on average in August, at around 24.2 °C, and lowest in January, at around -1.7 °C.

== Demographics ==
Per Japanese census data, the population of Sakegawa has declined by more than half from its peak around 1950.

Historical population
Year	Pop.	±% p.a.
1920	6,678	—
1930	7,571	+1.26%
1940	7,608	+0.05%
1950	9,056	+1.76%
1960	8,374	−0.78%
1970	7,057	−1.70%
1980	6,645	−0.60%
1990	6,396	−0.38%
2000	5,829	−0.92%
2010	4,862	−1.80%
2020	3,902	−2.18%

== History ==
The area of present-day was Sakegawa part of ancient Dewa Province. After the start of the Meiji period, the area became part of Mogami District, Yamagata Prefecture. The village of Sakegawa was established on December 1, 1954 by the merger of the villages of Toyota and Toyosato, both from Mogami District.

== Economy ==
The economy of Sakegawa is based on agriculture. The town is famous for nameko mushrooms, of which it produces a substantial percentage for Yamagata Prefecture. The town's other main exports are rice and flowers, such as roses and gentians. Sakegawa is also well known for fishing, with the Salmon Festival (鮭祭り) being held at Eco Park every October. The village is promoting agritourism ("green tourism") to increase revenues. Commerce is strongly dependent on the neighboring Shinjo city, but many residents also go to Mamurogawa town for shopping as there are no large commercial facilities such as supermarkets in the village.

== Education ==
Sakegawa has one public elementary school and one public middle school operated by the village government. The village does not have a high school.

== Transportation ==
=== Railway ===
East Japan Railway Company - Ōu Main Line

- Uzen-Toyosato

=== Highway ===
- National Route 458

== Sister cities ==
- Kawit, Cavite, Philippines

== Local attractions ==
=== Kabuki ===
Public kabuki theater performances are given on the first Sunday of July every year.

=== Niwazuki Kannon Lantern Festival ===
Held in August. Floating lanterns are sent down the river beginning at the Niwazuki Buddhist temple.

=== Salmon Festival ===
Held on the last Sunday of October every year. During this festival people pay a set price to attempt to catch salmon out of the river with their bare hands.
