= Innai Station =

Railway station in Yuzawa, Akita Prefecture, Japan

Innai Station 院内駅
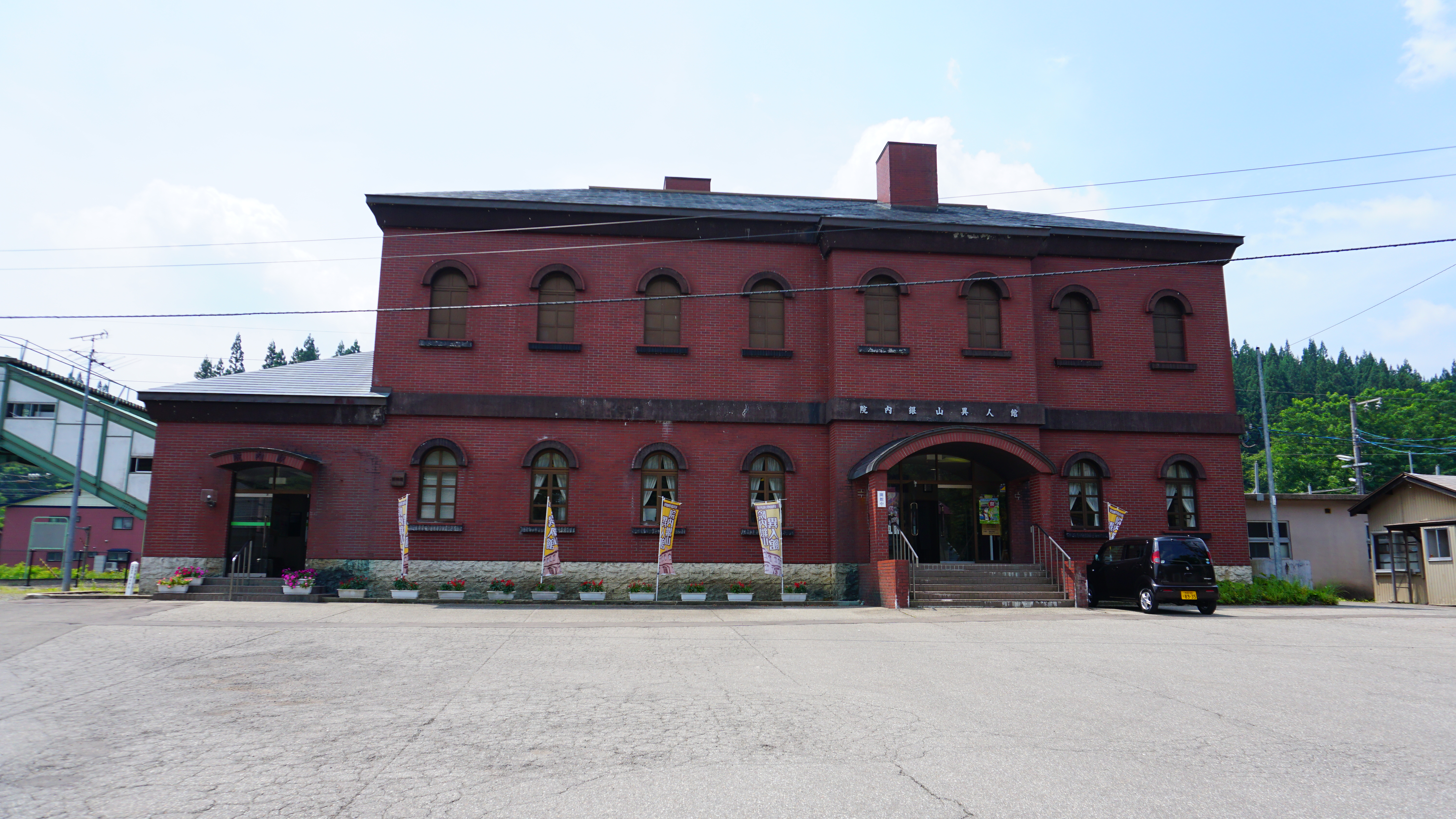
- Innai Station in July 2018

General information
- Location: Kozawa-115 Kamiinnai Yuzawa-shi, Akita-ken 019-0111; Japan
- Coordinates: 39°2′58.5″N 140°24′50.1″E
- Operator: JR East
- Line: ■ Ōu Main Line
- Distance: 194.4 kilometers from Fukushima
- Platforms: 1 side + 1 island platform

Other information
- Status: Unstaffed
- Website: Official website

History
- Opened: October 21, 1904

Passengers
- FY2007: 47

Services
Preceding station	JR East	Following station
Nozoki towards Shinjō	Ōu Main Line Local	Yokobori towards Aomori
Location
- Location within Akita Prefecture Location within Japan

Innai Station (院内駅, Innai eki) is a railway station on the Ōu Main Line in the city of Yuzawa, Akita Prefecture, Japan, operated by JR East.

== Lines ==
Innai Station is served by the Ōu Main Line, and is located 194.4 km from the terminus of the line at Fukushima Station.

== Station layout ==
The station consists of one side platform and one island platform connected to the station building by a footbridge. The station is unattended.

=== Platforms ===
1	■ Ōu Main Line	for Ōmagari and Akita
2	■ Ōu Main Line	for Shinjō and Yamagata
3	■ Ōu Main Line	for occasional service

== History ==
Innai Station opened on October 21, 1904, as a station on the Japanese Government Railways (JGR). The JGR became the Japan National Railways (JNR) after World War II. The station has been unattended since December 1979. The station was absorbed into the JR East network upon the privatization of the JNR on April 1, 1987. The original station building was destroyed by a fire on February 2, 1988. The current building, completed in March 1989, also serves as a local history museum.

== Passenger statistics ==
In fiscal 2007, the station was used by an average of 47 passengers daily (boarding passengers only).

== Surrounding area ==
Innai Station is located in the small hamlet of Innai, in the Ogachi area of southern Yuzawa City. Innai itself has few businesses, though central Ogachi, just to the north, has many. About 12 kilometers to the southeast lies Akinomiya Onsen, a popular hot spring resort area.

== See also ==
- List of railway stations in Japan
