= Shinjō, Yamagata =

Shinjō 新庄市
- City
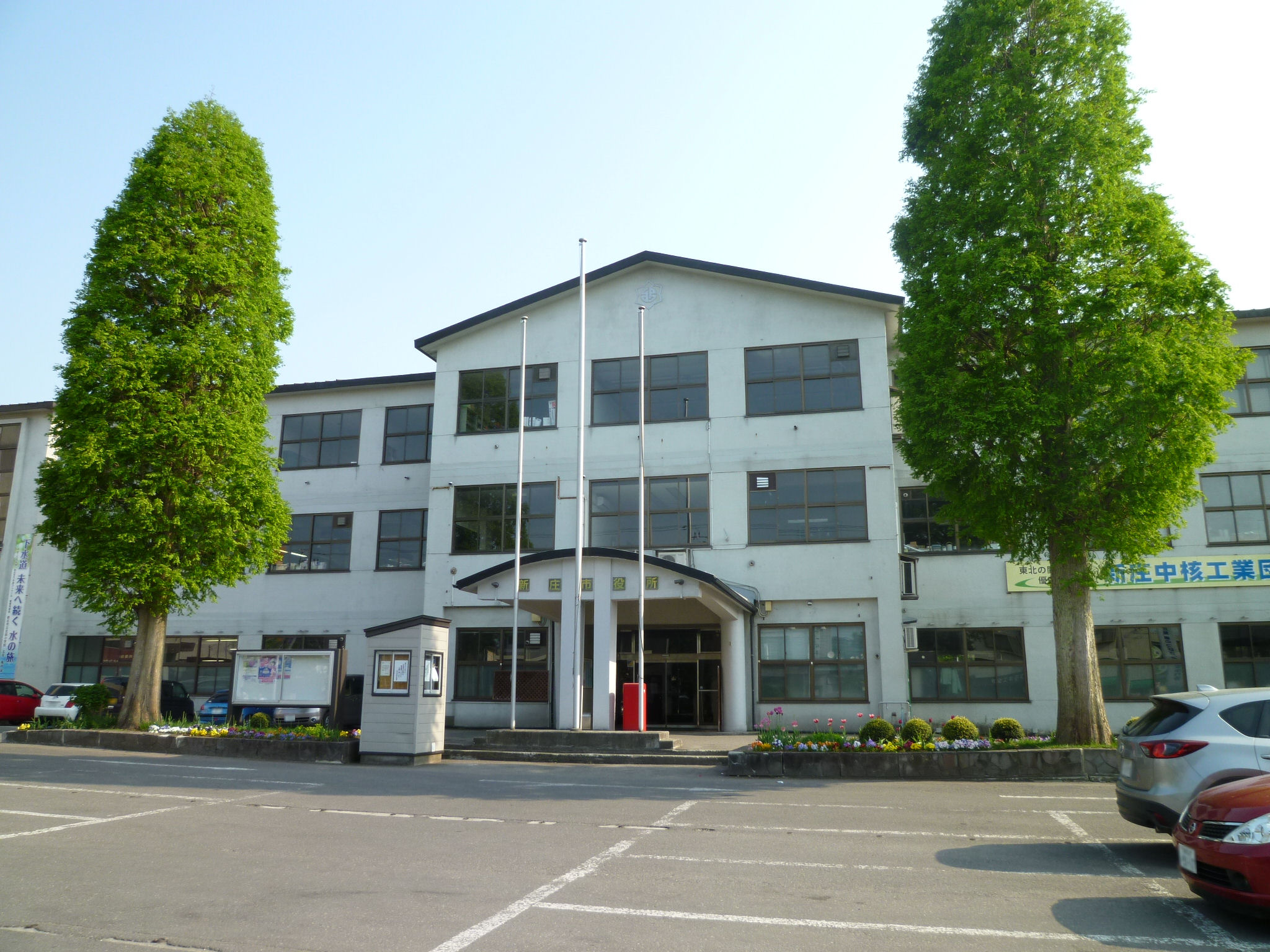
- Shinjō City Hall

- Flag Emblem

- Location of Shinjō in Yamagata Prefecture

- Coordinates: 38°46′N 140°18′E
- Country: Japan
- Region: Tōhoku
- Prefecture: Yamagata
- Town Settled: April 1, 1889
- City Settled: April 1, 1949

Government
  - Mayor: Tomonori Yamashina (from September 2023)

Area
  - Total: 223.08 km^{2} (86.13 sq mi)

Population (January 2020)
  - Total: 34,937
  - Density: 156.61/km^{2} (405.62/sq mi)
- Time zone: UTC+9 (Japan Standard Time)
- Phone number: 0233-22-2111
- Address: 10-37 Okinomachi, Shinjō-shi, Yamagata-ken 996-8501
- Climate: Cfa/Dfa
- Website: Official website
- Symbols
- Flower: Hydrangea
- Tree: Momi Fir

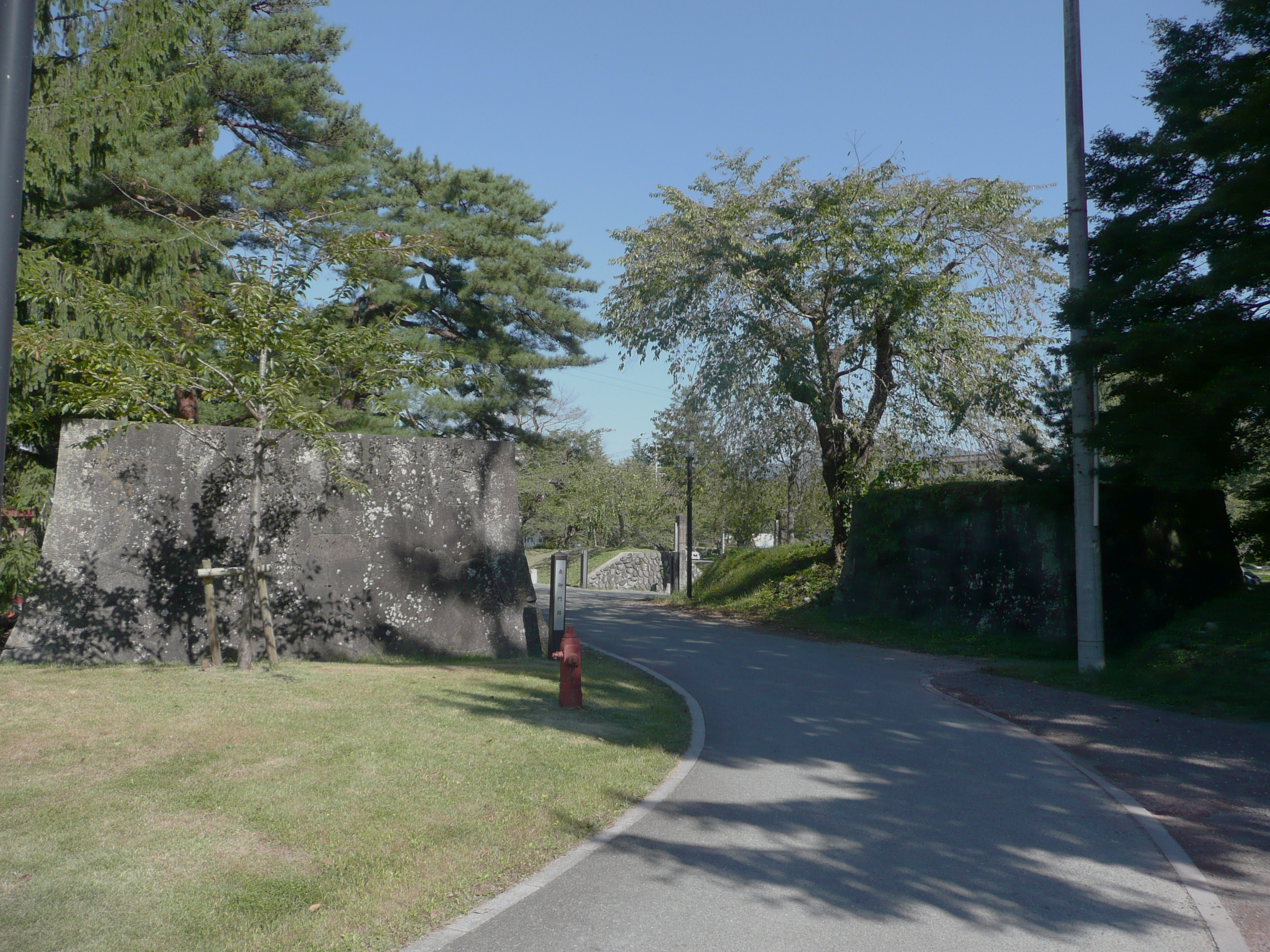
Ruins of Shinjō Castle

Shinjō (新庄市, Shinjō-shi) is a city in Yamagata Prefecture, Japan. As of 1 January 2020, the city had an estimated population of 34,937, and a population density of 160 persons per km^{2}. The total area of the city is 223.08 km^{2}.

== Geography ==
Shinjō is located in a mountain basin in northeast Yamagata Prefecture, north of Yamagata City. The Mogami River runs through the southwestern portion of city and the Masugata River flows through the city center. To the east of the city center is the Kamuro Mountain Range.

=== Neighboring municipalities ===
- Akita Prefecture
  - Yuzawa
- Yamagata Prefecture
  - Funagata
  - Kaneyama
  - Mamurogawa
  - Mogami
  - Okura
  - Sakegawa
  - Tozawa

== Climate ==
Shinjō has a humid continental climate (Köppen climate classification Dfa) with large seasonal temperature differences, with warm to hot (and often humid) summers and cold (sometimes severely cold) winters. Precipitation is significant throughout the year, but is heaviest from August to October. The average annual temperature in Shinjō is 11.0 °C (51.8 °F). The average annual rainfall is 2,005.6 mm (78.96 in) with December as the wettest month. The temperatures are highest on average in August, at around 24.2 °C (75.6 °F), and lowest in January, at around −0.8 °C (30.6 °F).

Climate data for Shinjō (elevation 105.1 m, 1991–2020 normals, extremes 1957–present)
Month	Jan	Feb	Mar	Apr	May	Jun	Jul	Aug	Sep	Oct	Nov	Dec	Year
Record high °C (°F)	13.3 (55.9)	17.3 (63.1)	21.0 (69.8)	30.2 (86.4)	33.9 (93.0)	33.8 (92.8)	37.3 (99.1)	37.8 (100.0)	35.8 (96.4)	30.1 (86.2)	22.5 (72.5)	19.0 (66.2)	37.8 (100.0)
Mean maximum °C (°F)	6.9 (44.4)	9.0 (48.2)	15.0 (59.0)	24.1 (75.4)	28.9 (84.0)	30.9 (87.6)	33.5 (92.3)	34.7 (94.5)	31.4 (88.5)	25.1 (77.2)	18.5 (65.3)	11.1 (52.0)	35.1 (95.2)
Mean daily maximum °C (°F)	2.0 (35.6)	3.0 (37.4)	7.1 (44.8)	14.5 (58.1)	20.9 (69.6)	24.7 (76.5)	27.7 (81.9)	29.4 (84.9)	25.1 (77.2)	18.4 (65.1)	11.1 (52.0)	4.4 (39.9)	15.7 (60.3)
Daily mean °C (°F)	−0.8 (30.6)	−0.5 (31.1)	2.4 (36.3)	8.5 (47.3)	14.8 (58.6)	19.3 (66.7)	23.0 (73.4)	24.2 (75.6)	19.9 (67.8)	13.2 (55.8)	6.7 (44.1)	1.5 (34.7)	11.0 (51.8)
Mean daily minimum °C (°F)	−3.7 (25.3)	−3.9 (25.0)	−1.6 (29.1)	3.1 (37.6)	9.5 (49.1)	14.9 (58.8)	19.3 (66.7)	20.2 (68.4)	15.9 (60.6)	9.1 (48.4)	3.0 (37.4)	−1.2 (29.8)	7.1 (44.8)
Mean minimum °C (°F)	−10.2 (13.6)	−9.9 (14.2)	−6.9 (19.6)	−2.2 (28.0)	3.0 (37.4)	9.4 (48.9)	15.0 (59.0)	15.3 (59.5)	9.0 (48.2)	2.6 (36.7)	−2.3 (27.9)	−6.5 (20.3)	−11.1 (12.0)
Record low °C (°F)	−19.6 (−3.3)	−20.2 (−4.4)	−16.5 (2.3)	−9.3 (15.3)	−2.1 (28.2)	3.7 (38.7)	7.6 (45.7)	10.9 (51.6)	4.1 (39.4)	−0.8 (30.6)	−5.8 (21.6)	−15.2 (4.6)	−20.2 (−4.4)
Average precipitation mm (inches)	238.4 (9.39)	154.0 (6.06)	126.7 (4.99)	97.5 (3.84)	107.7 (4.24)	126.0 (4.96)	219.6 (8.65)	196.4 (7.73)	140.5 (5.53)	156.5 (6.16)	187.3 (7.37)	264.0 (10.39)	2,005.6 (78.96)
Average snowfall cm (inches)	233 (92)	165 (65)	77 (30)	6 (2.4)	0 (0)	0 (0)	0 (0)	0 (0)	0 (0)	0 (0)	12 (4.7)	148 (58)	637 (251)
Average precipitation days (≥ 0.5 mm)	26.4	22.5	20.2	15.3	13.1	11.7	14.7	12.8	14.4	15.9	19.9	25.2	212.4
Average snowy days	29.4	25.1	20.3	4.6	0.0	0.0	0.0	0.0	0.0	0.0	8.3	24.7	113.0
Average relative humidity (%)	86	83	77	71	73	77	81	80	82	83	85	87	80
Mean monthly sunshine hours	37.1	59.9	107.6	154.5	176.2	158.0	132.7	164.8	125.2	104.7	66.6	36.8	1,324.6
Source: Japan Meteorological Agency (1991–2020 normals, extremes 1957–present)

== Demographics ==
Per Japanese census data, the population of Shinjō has declined in recent decades.

Historical population
Year	Pop.	±%
1920	26,003	—
1930	30,192	+16.1%
1940	31,730	+5.1%
1950	41,358	+30.3%
1960	43,550	+5.3%
1970	42,120	−3.3%
1980	42,911	+1.9%
1990	43,125	+0.5%
2000	42,151	−2.3%
2010	38,850	−7.8%
2020	34,432	−11.4%

== History ==
The rivers and deciduous forests around Shinjo have provided sufficient game and edible plants for human habitation since prehistoric times. Fragments of pottery and flints from the Jomon period (12,000 BC – 400 BC) continue to be found on building sites.

Two notable earthenware Jomon figures that are Nationally Designated Cultural Properties were found near Shinjo. One is a 4,500 year-old clay figure of a woman (45 cm) referred to as the Venus of the Jomon period (縄文時代の女神), excavated in Funagata Town. The other is the approximately 3,000 year-old Keppatsu Dogū 結髪土偶 (23.4 cm) found in Kamebuchi, Mamurogawa.

During the Yayoi period (400 BC – 300 AD) rice cultivation spread to the area now called Yamagata.

In 712, when Nara became the capital of Japan, the Dewa district was separated from Echigo Province to establish the Dewa Province. Later, the districts of Mogami (present day Mogami and Murayama) and the Okitama district of Mutsu Province were incorporated into Dewa Province.

Dewa Province had roughly the same borders as present-day Yamagata Prefecture, plus much of present-day Akita Prefecture, and Kinowanosaku Castle in Sakata City is believed to have been the center of the Dewa Province government.

Several important temples in Yamagata were founded during this period, including religious centers established by mountain ascetics on the three sacred mountains known as the Dewa Sanzan.

From the Asuka period (538–710) through the Heian period (794–1192), Yamagata had been shifting towards inclusion in the centralized government located in Kyoto and Nara. However, near the end of the Heian period, conflict arose and Yamagata was recognized as being under the rule of the Oshu Fujiwara Clan. Legends about the famous warrior, Minamoto Yoshitsune, have been passed down in the Shonai and Mogami regions of Yamagata ever since.

At the start of the Kamakura period (1192–1333), the Oshu Fujiwara Clan were defeated by the Kanto Bushi warriors. This led to the Oe Clan (including the Sagae Clan and Nagai Clan) controlling the regions of Murayama and Okitama, and the Mutou Clan (including the Daihoji Clan) controlling the Shonai region.

At the start of the Muromachi period (1338–1573), during the era of conflict between the Northern and Southern Imperial Courts, the Shiba Clan, based in what is now northern Miyagi Prefecture, ruled the Oshu region. In 1356, they dispatched Shiba Kaneyori to govern the Ushu area of Yamagata. The Shiba Clan established its base in Mogami (now Yamagata City). They changed the clan name from Shiba to Mogami and expanded control over the region. During the Warring States period (15th–17th centuries), Mogami Yoshiaki (最上義光) moved his forces northward and expanded the Mogami Clan's territory to include the Murayama, Mogami, and Shonai regions.

The decisive battle of Sekigahara (1600) resulted in the establishment of the Tokugawa Shogunate, the final feudal regime to rule over Japan. Under the Tokugawa Shogunate, most of Yamagata was controlled by the great feudal lord Mogami Yoshiaki. The Mogami fief became the fifth largest in Japan, excluding lands held by the Tokugawa. Mogami Yoshiaki developed flood control of the Mogami River to allow for safer navigation and for irrigation to increase rice farming. He also reconstructed and expanded Yamagata Castle and the surrounding castle town.

Mogami Yoshiaki died at Yamagata Castle in 1614. Internal struggles for control within the Tokugawa Shogunate resulted in the 1622 seizure of most of the Mogami Clan territory. The Mogami family survived and still exists as a koke (高家). The area formerly administered by the Mogami Clan was divided into regions directly ruled or controlled by feudal lords close to the Tokugawa Shogunate. The Sakai Clan was given control of the Shonai region, and the Tozawa Clan controlled the Shinjo region until the end of the Tokugawa Shogunate in 1868.

Shipments of products, especially rice and Mogami safflower (benihana, 紅花, used for the classic Japanese red dye), led to a flourishing trade along the Mogami River and Sakata became one of the most active ports along the Sea of Japan. Remarkably, the Honma family of Sakata, rich from the shipping business 北船, were for a time the biggest landowners in all Japan.

In 1871, when clans were abolished and prefectures established, Yamagata was initially divided into seven separate areas (Yamagata, Yonezawa, Kaminoyama, Tendo, Shinjo, Oizumi and Matsumine). In 1876 these districts were finally merged to create Yamagata Prefecture.

During the Edo period, present-day Shinjō was the center of the Shinjō Domain, a 65,000 koku Tokugawa feudal domain controlled by the Tozawa Clan (1622–1871) who built Shinjō Castle. Part of the stone wall and the moat are all that remain of the castle that was completely destroyed in the Battle of Shinjō during the Boshin War for the Meiji restoration.

From 1878, the area was administered as Shinjō Town within the Mogami District of Yamagata Prefecture and prospered as a center for horse farms providing mounts for Imperial Japanese Army cavalry regiments. Shinjo was not bombed during World War II except for a single air raid that killed six people.

Shinjō became a city on April 1, 1946, merging with the neighboring villages of Hagino on April 1, 1955, and Yamuki on September 30, 1956. Shinjo Station first opened in 1903 with the extension of the (奥羽本線, Ōu-honsen) rail line from Yamagata City. Shinjo is the terminus for the Tohoku Shinkansen and a transportation hub with four railway lines.

== Economy ==
The economy of Shinjō is based on light manufacturing, agriculture and wood products.

== Government ==
Shinjō has a mayor-council form of government with a directly elected mayor and a unicameral city legislature of 18 members. The city contributes two members to the Yamagata Prefectural Assembly. In terms of national politics, the city is part of Yamagata District 2 of the lower house of the Diet of Japan.

== Education ==
Shinjō has six public elementary schools and four public middle schools operated by the city government and three public high schools operated by the Yamagata Prefectural Board of Education. There is also one private high school. The prefecture also operates one special education school for the handicapped.

== Transportation ==
=== Railway ===
East Japan Railway Company – Yamagata Shinkansen

- Shinjō

East Japan Railway Company – Ōu Main Line

- Shinjō – Izumita

East Japan Railway Company – Rikuu East Line

- Minami-Shinjō – Shinjō

East Japan Railway Company – Rikuu West Line

- Shinjō – Masukata – Uzen-Zennami

=== Highways ===
- Tōhoku-Chūō Expressway – Shinjō Interchange
- National Route 13
- National Route 47
- National Route 458

== Local attractions ==
=== Shinjō Matsuri ===
One of the premier festivals of Yamagata Prefecture, Shinjō Matsuri (or Shinjō Festival) is a summer-time celebration held annually from August 24–26. Held since 1755, the festival was established by the local daimyō (feudal lord) to lift the spirits of the common people after a particularly bad harvest. The current incarnation of the festival includes traditional dancing, a reenactment of the first "Daimyō Parade", traditional festival vending stalls, and the Yattai Parade, in which each neighborhood in the city constructs large, vivid scenes from Japanese/local history, folklore, and/or fairy tales on wide floats. These are then pulled throughout the city by children both at day and at night for the three days of the festival. A traditional hayashi band of taiko drums, cymbals, shamisen, and Japanese flute follow behind. The hands, feet, and faces of the figures on the floats are based on traditional Noh design. The floats are judged and the three winners displayed in Shinjō Station, and the Shinjō History Center. The rest are dismantled. In 2017, the Shinjō Matsuri was added to the list of UNESCO Intangible Cultural Heritage.

== Notable people from Shinjō ==
- Yoshihiro Togashi, Manga artist
