= 719 series =

Japanese train type

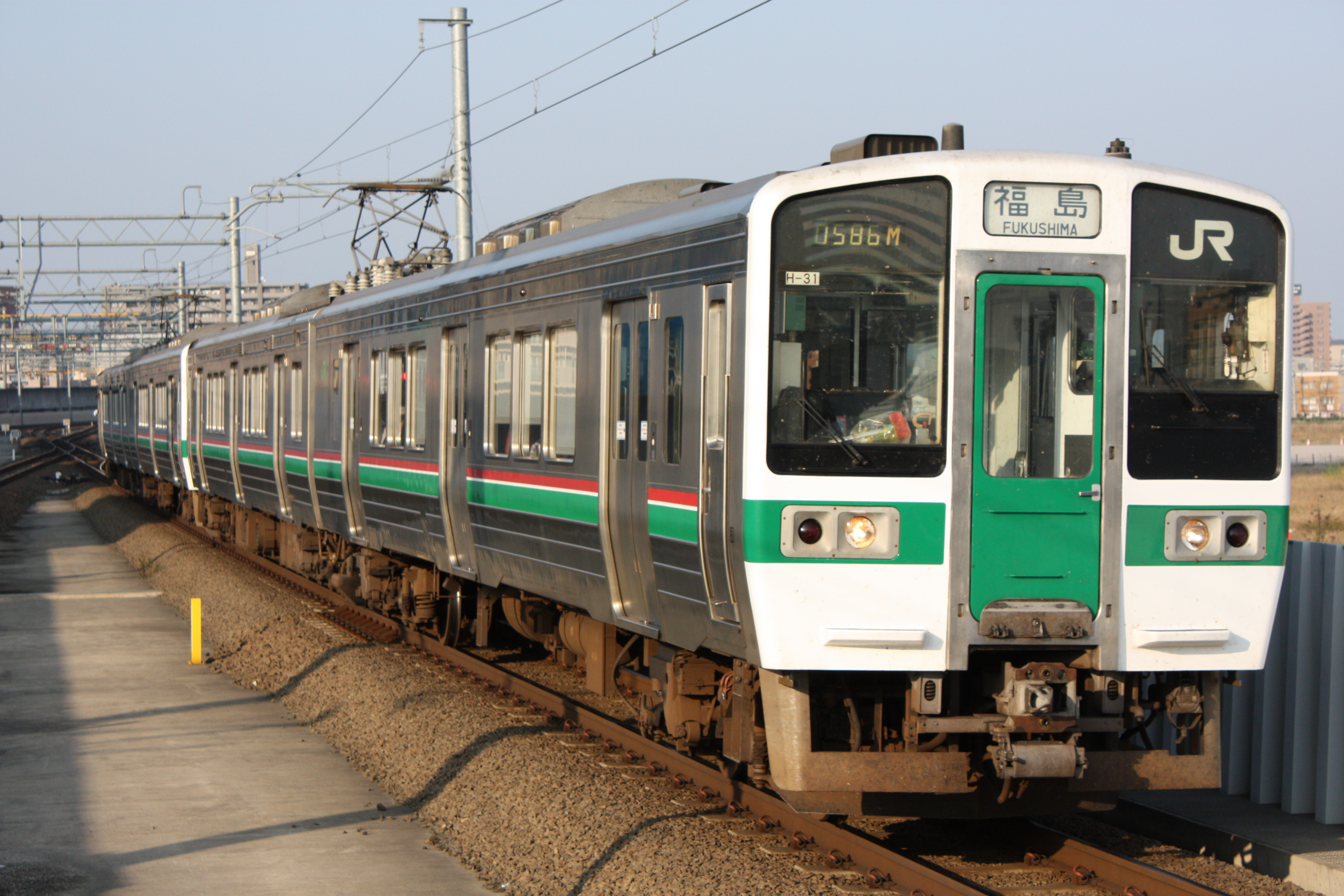
- A 719-0 series set in the Sendai area in July 2008
- Manufacturers: Nippon Sharyo, Tokyu Car Corporation
- Constructed: 1989–1991
- Entered service: 5 November 1991
- Scrapped: 2016-
- Number built: 108 vehicles (54 sets)
- Number in service: 24 vehicles (12 sets) (as of 1 April 2026)
- Number scrapped: 84 vehicles (42 sets)
- Successor: E721-1000 series, E723-5000 series (planned)
- Formation: 2 cars per set
- Fleet numbers: H1 – H26, H28 – H42, S27, Y1 – Y12
- Operator: JR East
- Depots: Sendai, Yamagata, Akita
- Lines served: Tohoku Main Line, Ōu Main Line, Senzan Line, Banetsu West Line

Specifications
- Car body construction: Stainless steel
- Car length: 20,000 mm (65 ft 7 in)
- Width: 2,950 mm (9 ft 8 in)
- Floor height: 1,180 mm (3 ft 10 in)
- Doors: 3 pairs per side (719-700 series has one pair per side)
- Maximum speed: 110 km/h (70 mph)
- Traction system: Thyristor drive
- Electric system: 20 kV AC (50 Hz)
- Current collection: overhead catenary
- Safety systems: ATS-Ps (719-0 series); ATS-P (719-5000 series)
- Track gauge: 1,067 mm (3 ft 6 in) (719-0 series); 1,435 mm (4 ft 8 1/2 in) (719-5000 series)

The 719 series (Japanese: 719系) is an AC electric multiple unit (EMU) train type introduced in 1989 by East Japan Railway Company (JR East) on services in the Miyagi, Yamagata, and Fukushima areas of Japan.

Built jointly by Nippon Sharyo and Tokyu Car, the type is based on the 415-1500 series EMU design, with all units formed as 2-car sets.

== Variants ==
- 719-0 series: 1,067 mm (3 ft 6 in) narrow-gauge type based at Sendai and Akita depots
- 719-5000 series: 1,435 mm (4 ft 8 1/2 in) standard-gauge type based at Yamagata Depot

As of 1 April 2017, the fleet consists of 34 719-0 series two-car sets based at Sendai, two 719-0 series two-car sets based at Akita, and 12 719-5000 series two-car sets based at Yamagata.

== 719-0 series ==
The 719-0 series consists of 1,067 mm (3 ft 6 in) narrow-gauge two-car sets based at Sendai Depot for use on the Tohoku Main Line, Senzan Line, and Banetsu West Line, and at Akita Depot for use on the Ou Main Line. 42 sets were built by Tokyu Car Corporation between December 1989 and August 1991. The trains reused some equipment from withdrawn JNR-era EMUs, including the DT32 (motored) and TR69 (trailer) bogies, as well as the pantographs.

Some sets (H10 to H15) were reliveried in an "Akabe" colour scheme for Banetsu West Line services from 2007. One set, H27, was converted to become the 719-700 series FruiTea excursion train in 2015.

Sets H10 and H13 were transferred from Sendai to Akita in March 2017, entering revenue service on Akita area services on 28 July 2017. These sets were reliveried with a pink bodyline stripe to match the 701 series trains already used in the area.

Due to lacking of spare train components, the 719-0 series was gradually replaced by the E721-1000 series from 2017. As of March 2020, all sets were withdrawn from revenue services except sets H10, H13 and H27.

=== Formations ===
The 719-0 series sets are numbered H1 to H42, and are formed as follows, with one motored "Mc" car and one non-powered trailer ("Tc") car, and the KuHa 718 car at the southern end.

Designation	Tc'	Mc
Numbering	KuHa 718	KuMoHa 719
Weight (t)	32.7	43.0
Capacity (total/seated)	131/59	134/62

The KuMoHa 719 cars have one PS16 lozenge-type pantograph. Sets H10 to H18 have single-arm pantographs. The KuHa 718 cars have a toilet.

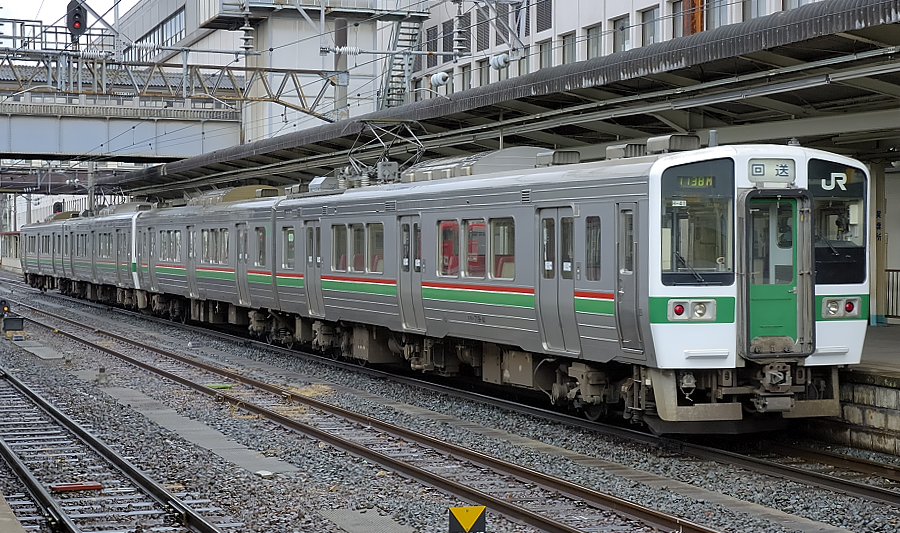
A pair of 719-0 series sets at Koriyama Station in March 2007

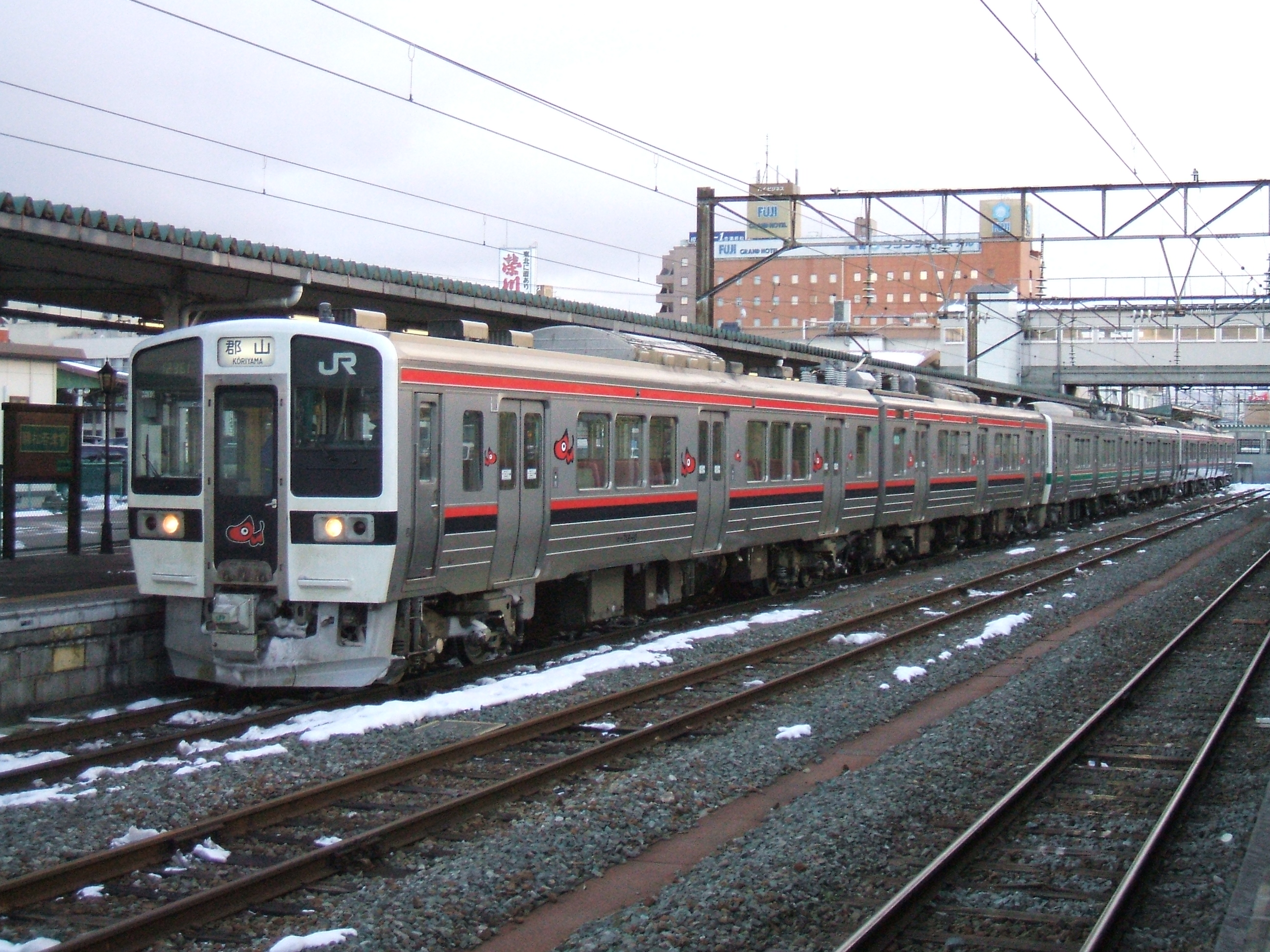
A 719-0 series in Banetsu West Line "Akabe" livery in January 2008

=== Interior ===
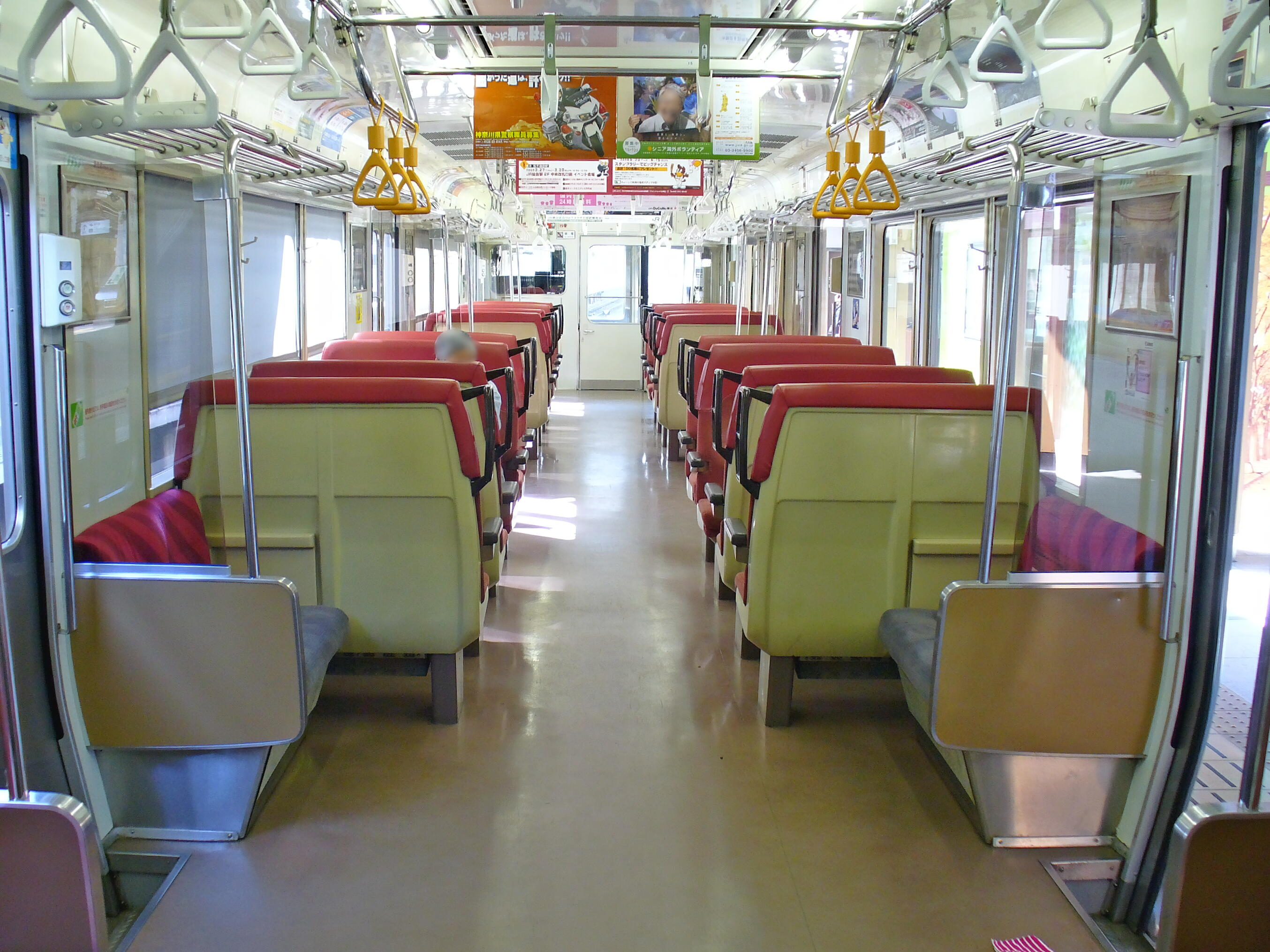
Interior of a 719-0 series car in April 2008

== 719-5000 series ==
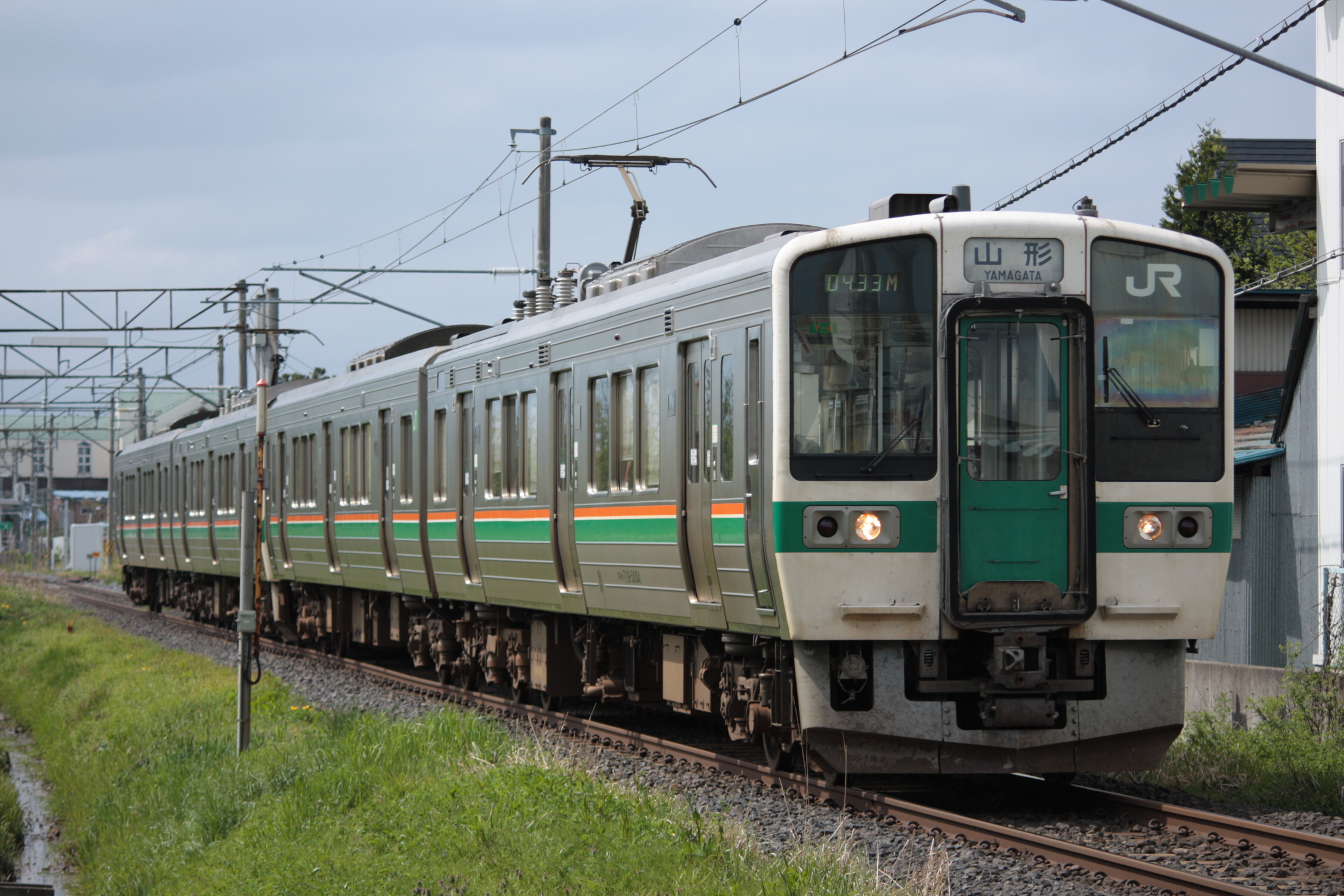
A standard-gauge 719-5000 series set in May 2009

The 719-5000 series consists of 1,435 mm (4 ft 8 1/2 in) standard gauge two-car sets based at Yamagata Depot for use on the Ōu Main Line. Twelve sets were built between September and October 1991. These entered service in November 1991 on the re-gauged Ōu Main Line, replacing the trains previously formed of 50 series coaches hauled by Class EF71 AC electric locomotives.

=== Formations ===
The 719-5000 series sets are numbered Y1 to Y12, and are formed as follows, with one motored "Mc" car and one non-powered trailer ("Tc") car, and the KuHa 718 car at the southern end.

Designation	Tc'	Mc
Numbering	KuHa 718-5000	KuMoHa 719-5000
Weight (t)	31.0	41.0
Capacity (total/seated)	135/59	138/62

The KuMoHa 719 cars have one PS104 single-arm pantograph. The KuHa 718 cars have a toilet.

=== Interior ===
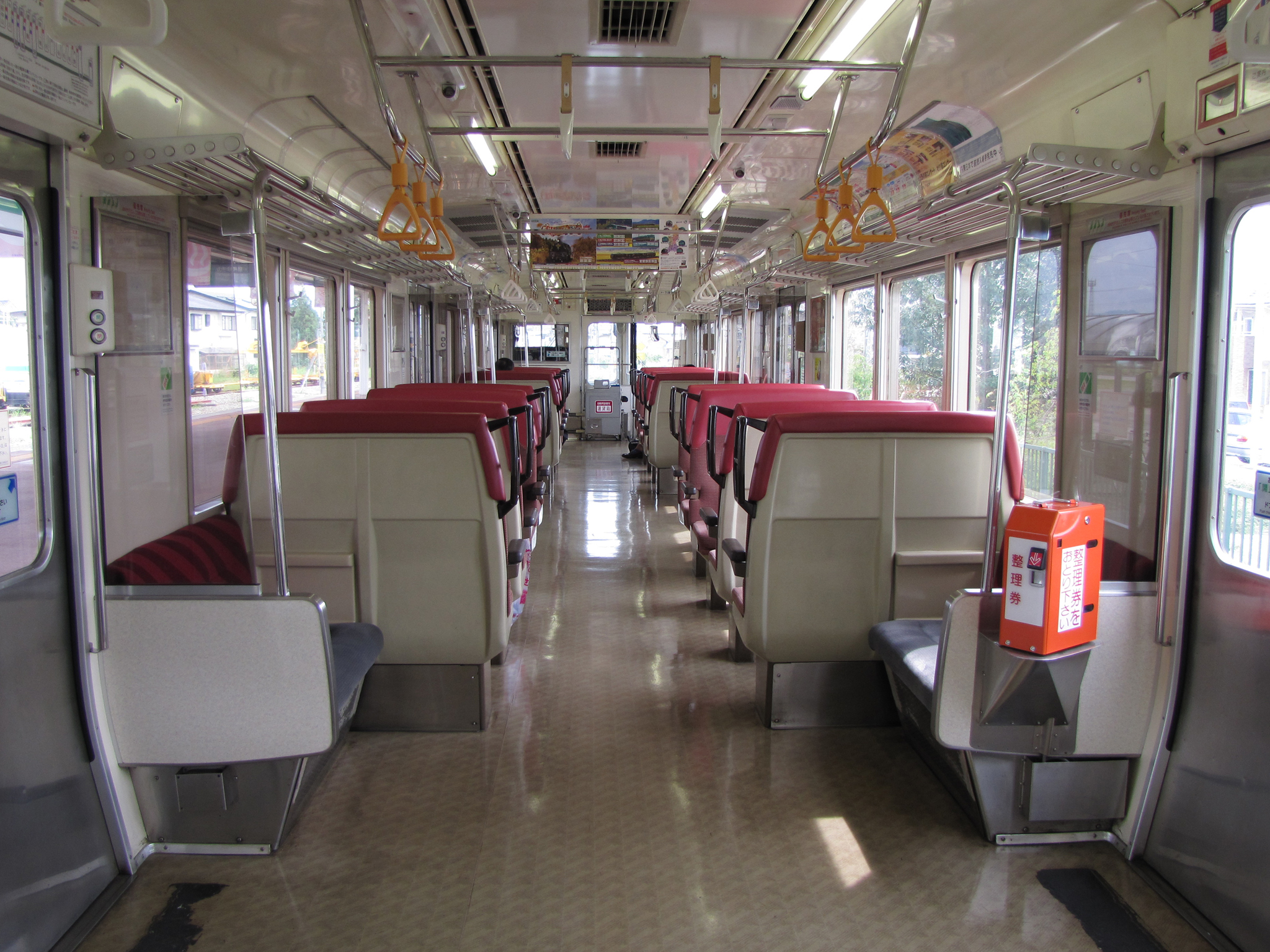
Interior of a KuHa 718-5000 car in September 2012

=== Future plans ===
New E723 series trainsets were introduced in September 2026 to replace the 719-5000 series.

== FruiTea excursion train ==
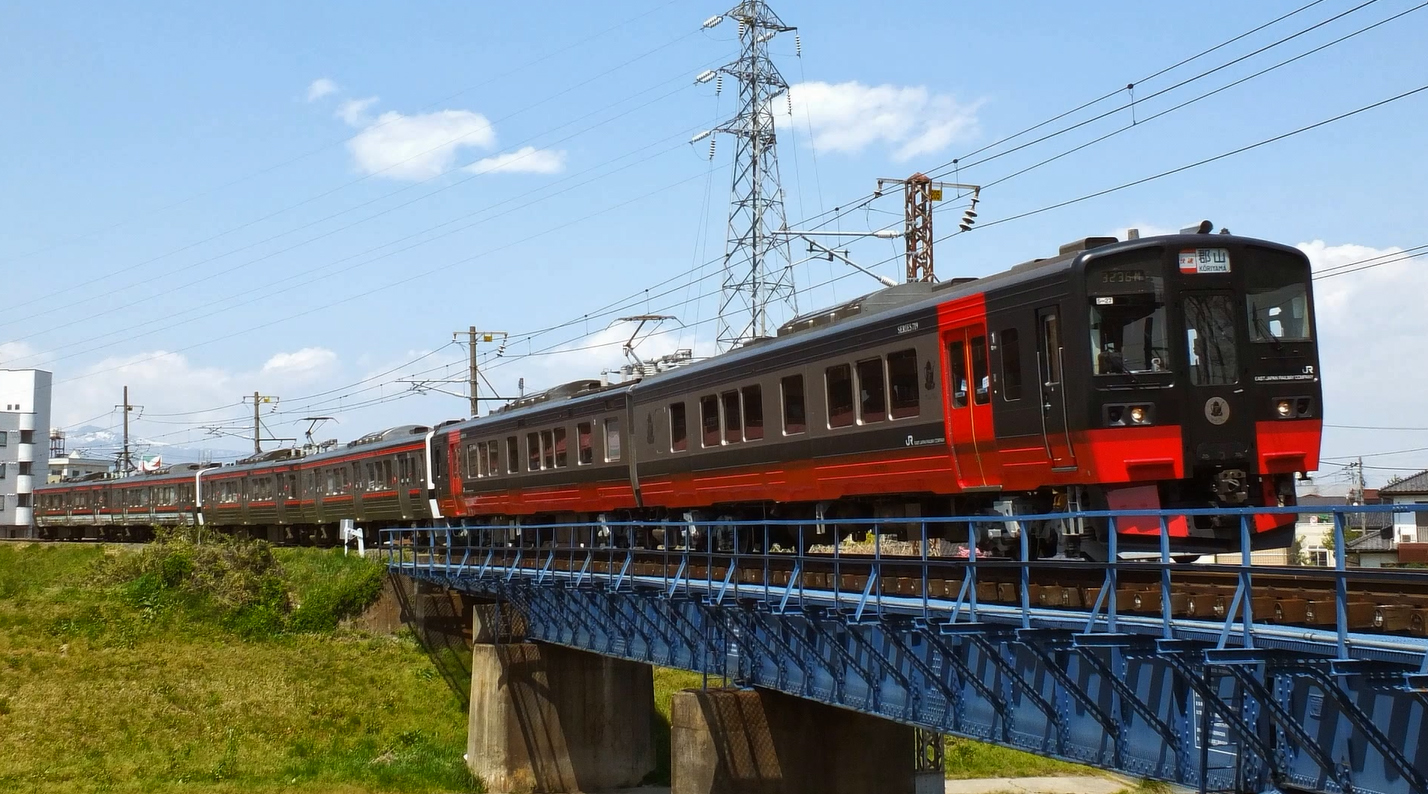
The 719-700 series "FruiTea" trainset in April 2015

In 2015, one 719-0 series set, H27, was converted to become the 719-700 series excursion train branded "FruiTea" (フルーティア). This entered service on 25 April 2015, operating on the Banetsu West Line between Koriyama and Aizu-Wakamatsu. The train consists of a cafe car and seating car, with accommodation for 36 passengers. The FruiTea service ended on 24 December 2023.

=== Formation ===
The two car set is formed as follows. Car KuShi 718-701 was renumbered from former car number KuHa 718-27, and car KuMoHa 719-701 was renumbered from former KuMoHa 719-27.

Car No.	1	2
Numbering	KuShi 718-701	KuMoHa 719-701
Weight (t)	35.7	46.0
Seating	0 (Note: Six bar stools are provided.)	36

=== Interior ===
Car KuShi 718-701 has a long curved bar counter and six bar stools. Car KuMoHa 719-701 has cafe-style seating with four- and two-person seating bays facing tables.

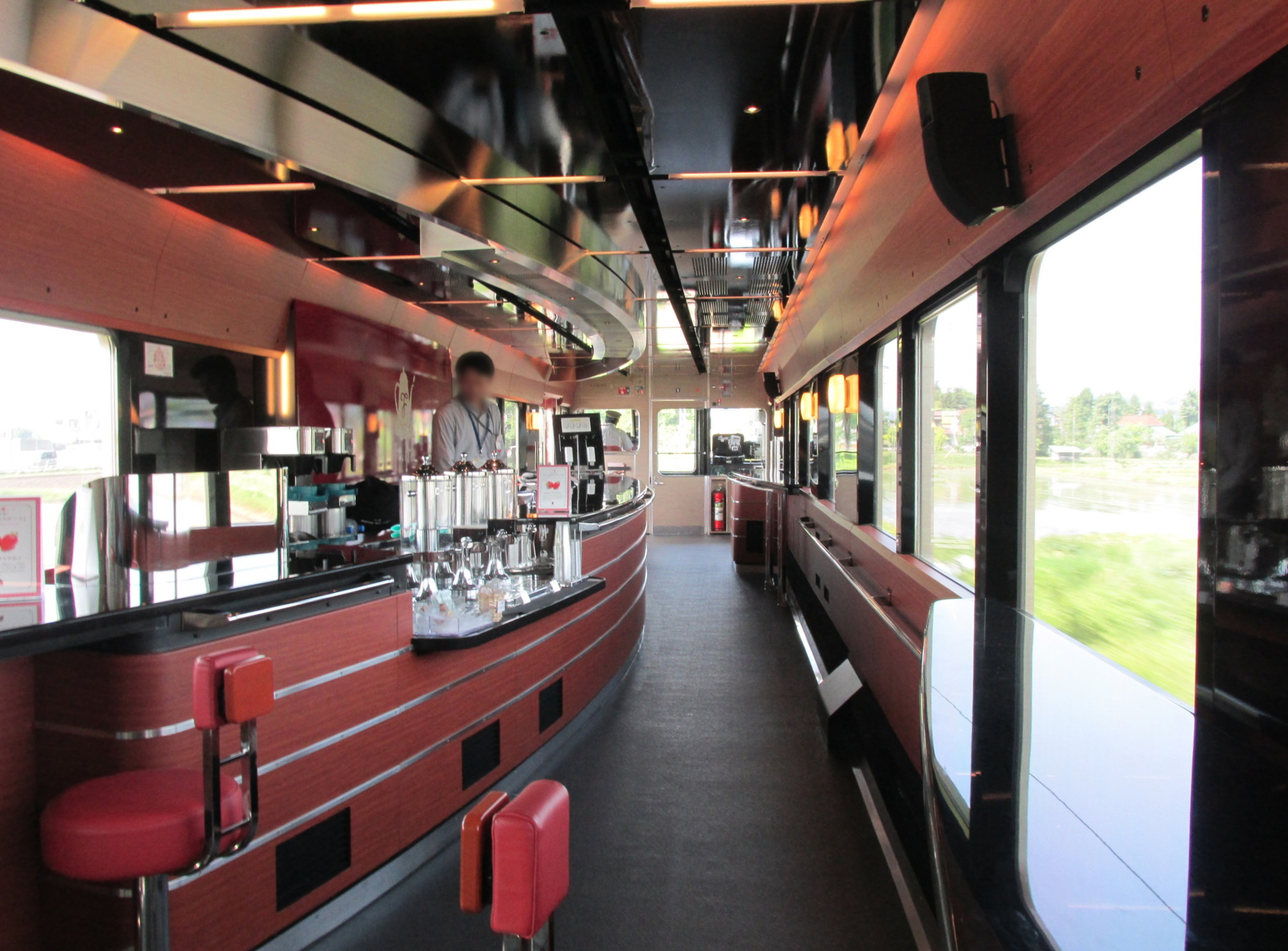
The interior of KuShi 718-701 in May 2015

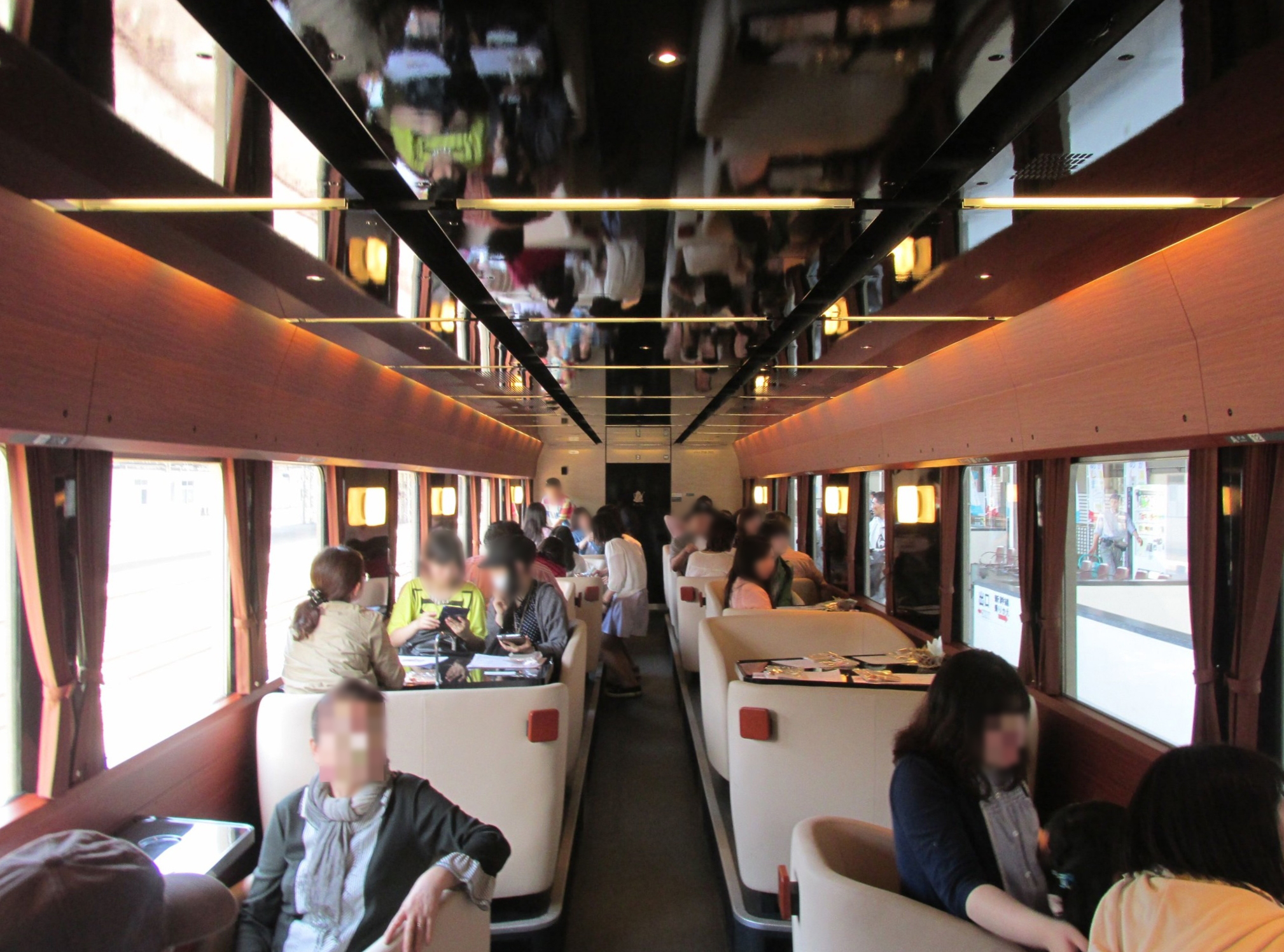
The interior of KuMoHa 719-701 in May 2015

== History ==
The first 719-0 series sets were delivered from Tokyu Car in Yokohama in December 1989. The 719-5000 series sets entered service from 5 November 1991 on the re-gauged Ou Main Line between Fukushima and Yamagata. The original pantographs on the 719-5000 series sets were replaced with single-arm pantographs in 2001.

Withdrawals commenced in 2016 with the entry into service of new E721-1000 series EMUs.

== Fleet details ==
The fleet histories and build details are as follows.

=== 719-0 series ===
Set No.	Manufacturer	Date delivered	Date withdrawn	Notes
H1	Tokyu Car	25 December 1989	14 April 2018	
H2	Tokyu Car	25 December 1989	25 August 2017	
H3	Tokyu Car	25 December 1989	15 May 2018	
H4	Tokyu Car	19 January 1990	27 July 2019	
H5	Tokyu Car	19 January 1990	29 November 2017	
H6	Tokyu Car	19 January 1990	12 July 2018	
H7	Tokyu Car	8 February 1990	7 July 2018	
H8	Tokyu Car	8 February 1990	23 June 2018	
H9	Tokyu Car	8 February 1990	4 June 2019	
H10	Tokyu Car	27 April 1990	14 March 2020	
H11	Tokyu Car	26 April 1990	6 April 2018	
H12	Tokyu Car	27 April 1990	4 June 2019	
H13	Tokyu Car	26 April 1990	14 March 2020	
H14	Tokyu Car	27 April 1990	13 April 2018	
H15	Tokyu Car	24 May 1990	27 July 2019	
H16	Tokyu Car	24 May 1990	10 August 2019	
H17	Tokyu Car	25 May 1990	9 May 2020	
H18	Tokyu Car	25 May 1990	25 August 2017	
H19	Tokyu Car	25 May 1990	1 June 2020	
H20	Tokyu Car	13 July 1990	15 May 2020	
H21	Tokyu Car	13 July 1990	5 November 2016	
H22	Tokyu Car	13 July 1990	10 August 2019	
H23	Tokyu Car	27 July 1990	1 March 2017	
H24	Tokyu Car	27 July 1990	20 December 2016	
H25	Tokyu Car	27 July 1990	22 June 2018	
H26	Tokyu Car	13 August 1990	25 August 2017	
H27	Tokyu Car	13 August 1990		Converted to 719-700 series
H28	Tokyu Car	13 August 1990	21 November 2017	
H29	Tokyu Car	24 August 1990	1 March 2017	
H30	Tokyu Car	24 August 1990	18 April 2019	
H31	Tokyu Car	24 August 1990	20 April 2019	
H32	Tokyu Car	29 July 1991	27 December 2016	
H33	Tokyu Car	29 July 1991	27 December 2016	
H34	Tokyu Car	30 July 1991	25 August 2017	
H35	Tokyu Car	30 July 1991	23 November 2017	
H36	Tokyu Car	31 July 1991	15 May 2019	
H37	Tokyu Car	21 August 1991	30 November 2017	
H38	Tokyu Car	21 August 1991	12 May 2018	
H39	Tokyu Car	KuHa 718-39: 22 August 1991; KuMoHa 719-39: 21 August 1991	7 April 2018	
H40	Tokyu Car	30 August 1991	14 March 2019	
H41	Tokyu Car	30 August 1991	9 May 2020	
H42	Tokyu Car	31 August 1991	31 January 2018	

=== 719-5000 series ===
Set No.	Manufacturer	Date delivered
Y1	Nippon Sharyo	4 September 1991
Y2	Nippon Sharyo	5 September 1991
Y3	Nippon Sharyo	13 October 1991
Y4	Nippon Sharyo	13 October 1991
Y5	Nippon Sharyo	13 October 1991
Y6	Nippon Sharyo	14 October 1991
Y7	Nippon Sharyo	14 October 1991
Y8	Nippon Sharyo	14 October 1991
Y9	Nippon Sharyo	22 October 1991
Y10	Nippon Sharyo	22 October 1991
Y11	Nippon Sharyo	22 October 1991
Y12	Nippon Sharyo	22 October 1991

=== 719-700 series ===
Set No.	Manufacturer	Date converted	Date withdrawn	Notes
S27 (KuShi 718-701+KuMoha 719-701)	(Tokyu Car)	6 March 2015	11 January 2024	Converted from Set H27
