= Aoimori 703 series =

Japanese train type

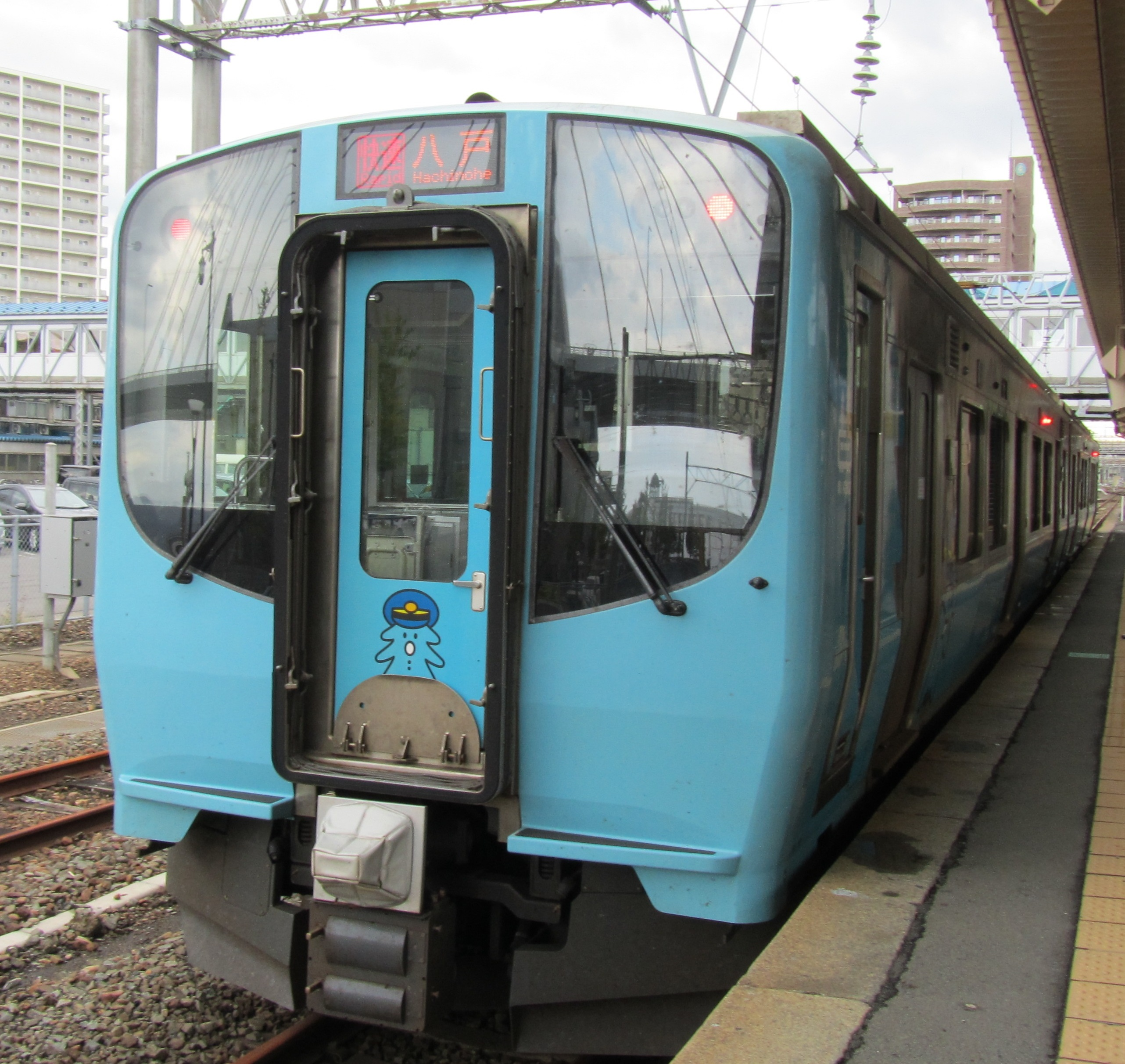
- A 703 series set at Aomori Station in October 2015
- Manufacturer: J-TREC
- Built at: Yokohama
- Constructed: 2013
- Entered service: 15 March 2014
- Number built: 4 vehicles (2 sets)
- Number in service: 4 vehicles (2 sets)
- Formation: 2 cars per trainset
- Capacity: 270 per set
- Operators: Aoimori Railway
- Lines served: Aoimori Railway Line

Specifications
- Car body construction: Stainless steel
- Car length: 20,000 mm (65 ft 7 in)
- Width: 2,950 mm (9 ft 8 in)
- Height: 43,550 mm (142 ft 11 in)
- Doors: 3 pairs per side
- Maximum speed: 110 km/h (68 mph) (service); 120 km/h (75 mph) (design)
- Electric system(s): 20 kV AC, 50 Hz
- Current collector(s): Overhead lines
- Track gauge: 1,067 mm (3 ft 6 in)

The Aoimori 703 series (青い森703系) is an electric multiple unit (EMU) train type operated by the third-sector railway operator Aoimori Railway on the Aoimori Railway Line in Aomori Prefecture, Japan, since March 2014.

== Overview ==
Based on the JR East E721 series EMUs first introduced in 2006, two two-car 703 series trains were manufactured by J-TREC in Yokohama, Kanagawa. Built at a total cost of 800 million yen, one set was purchased directly by the Aoimori Railway, and one set is leased.

== Formation ==
The two two-car sets consist of one motored ("Mc") car and one unpowered trailer ("Tc") car, and are formed as shown below.

Car No.	1	2
Designation	Tc	Mc
Numbering	Aoimori 702-1x	Aoimori 703-1x

The "Mc" car is fitted with one single-arm pantograph.

== Interior ==
Passenger accommodation consists of a mixture of transverse seating bays and longitudinal bench seating. Passenger information is provided by LED displays above the doorways. The trains are equipped with universal access toilets.

== History ==
The two sets on order were delivered from J-TREC's Yokohama factory to Aomori in November 2013. The two sets entered revenue service from the start of the revised timetable on 15 March 2014.

=== Future plans ===
Effective the timetable revision on 18 March 2023, 703 series will operate as far south as Sannohe Station on the Aoimori Railway Line. Trains currently only operate as far south as Hachinohe Station.

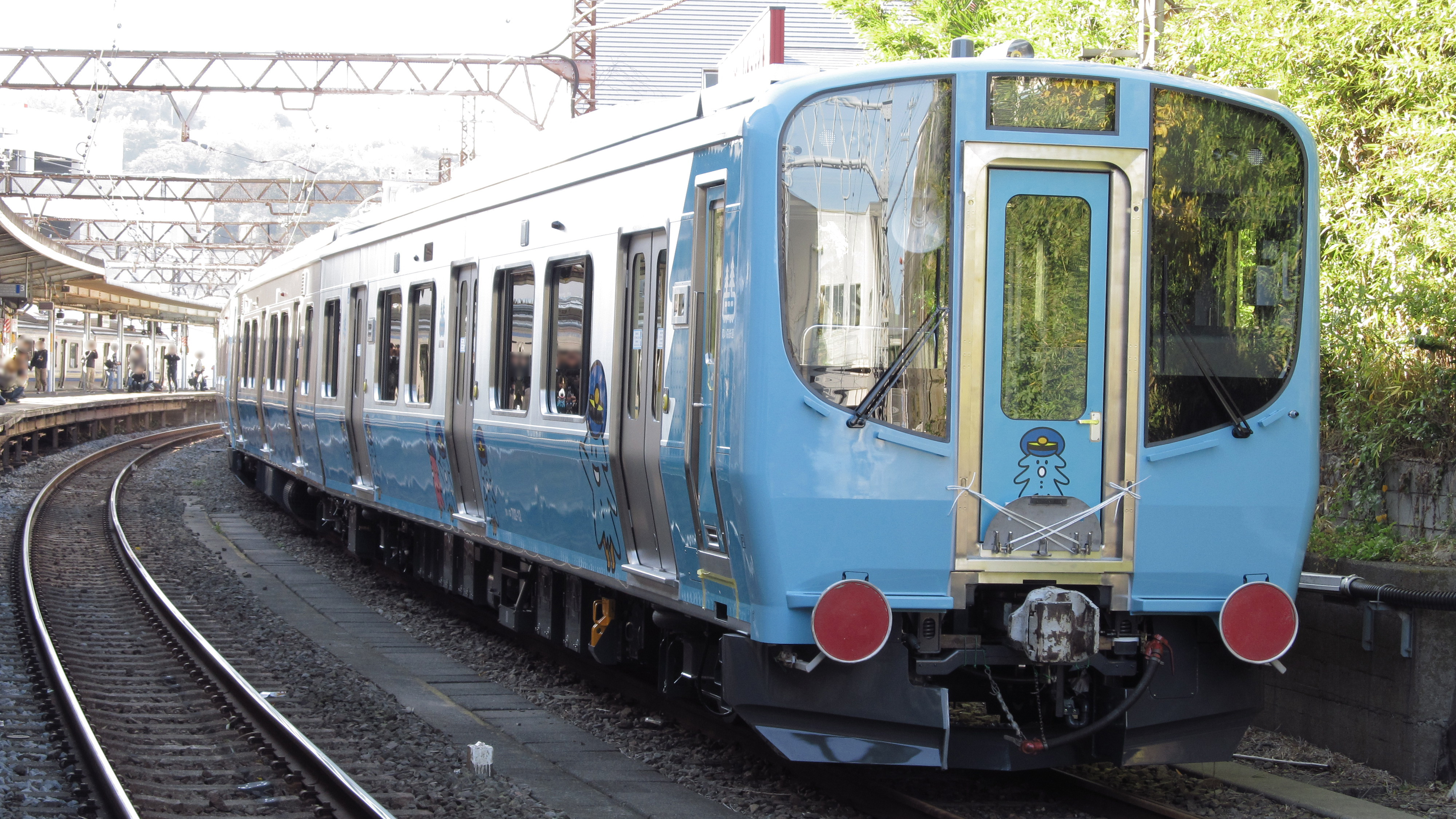
The first two sets on delivery from J-TREC in November 2013

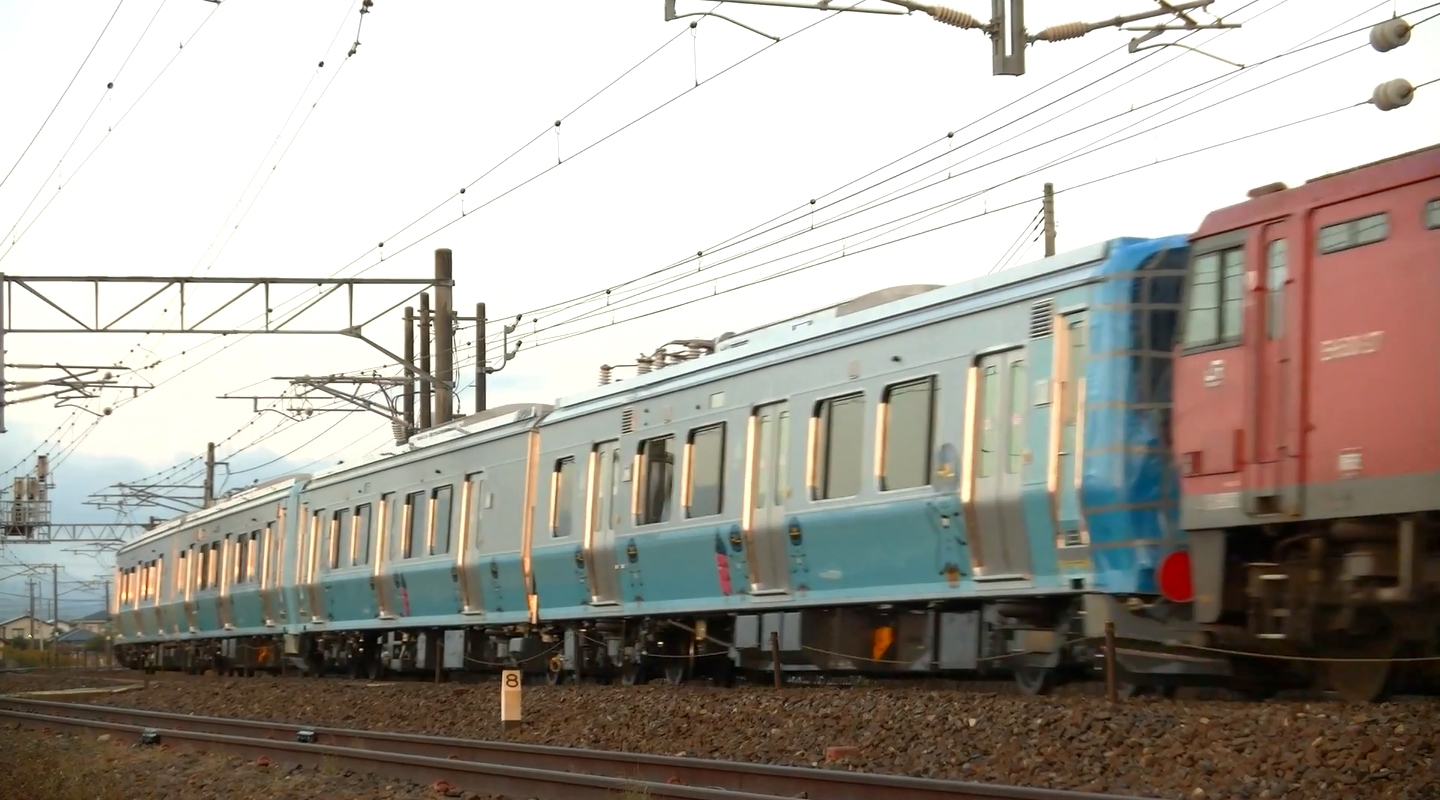
The first two sets being delivered in November 2013

== See also ==
- 701 series
