= E721 series =

Japanese train type

E721 / SAT721 / AB900 series
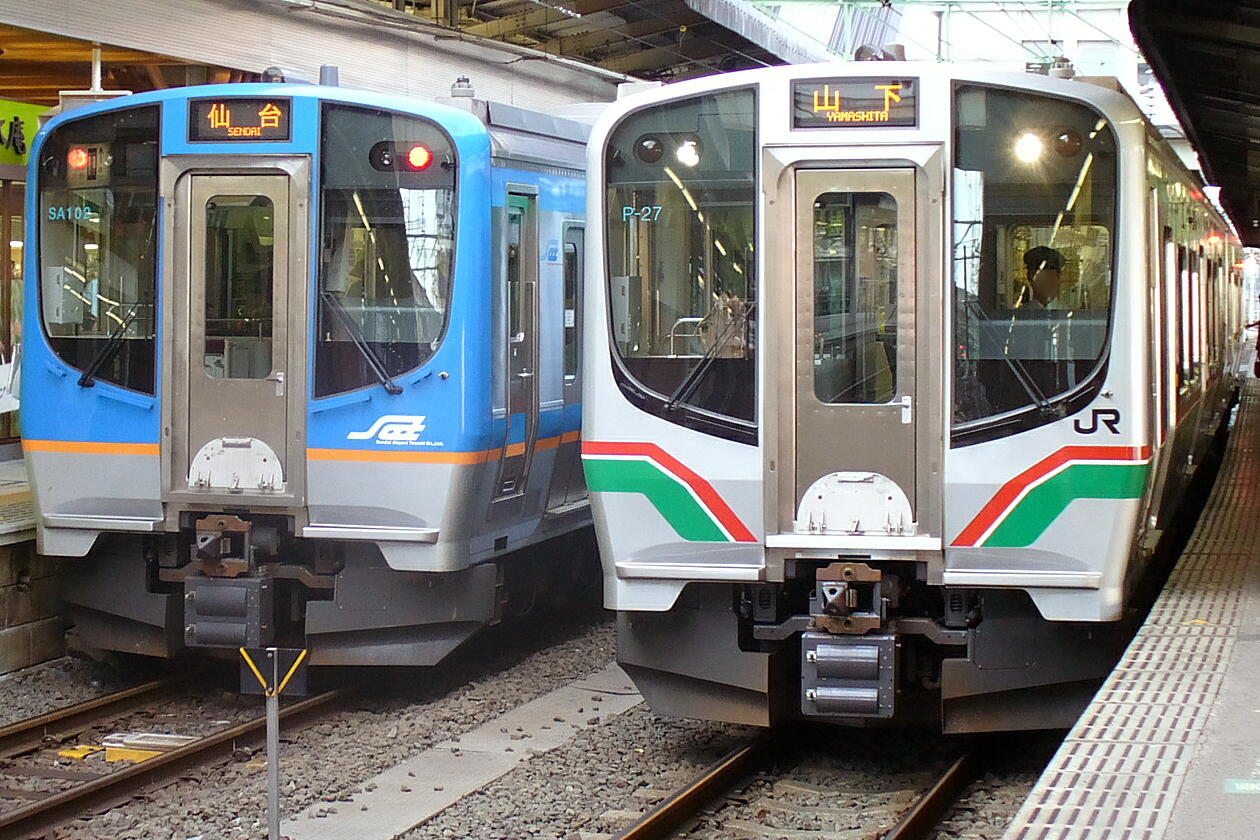
- E721-0 series (right) and the SAT721 series variant (left), August 2007
- Stock type: electric multiple unit
- Manufacturers: Kawasaki Heavy Industries, Tokyu Car Corporation, J-TREC
- Replaced: 417, 455, 717 and 719 series
- Constructed: 2006–
- Entered service: February 2007
- Number under construction: 36 vehicles (9 sets)
- Number built: 146 vehicles (63 sets)
- Number in service: 142 vehicles (61 sets)
- Number scrapped: 4 vehicles (2 sets, tsunami damage)
- Formation: 2 or 4 cars per set
- Fleet numbers: P1–P44, P501–P504, P4-1–P4-19, SA101–SA103
- Operators: JR East; Sendai Airport Transit (SAT721); Abukuma Express (AB900)
- Depot: Sendai
- Lines served: Tōhoku Main Line; Jōban Line; Senzan Line; Sendai Airport Line; Abukuma Express Line

Specifications
- Car body construction: Stainless steel
- Car length: 20,000 mm (65 ft 7 in)
- Width: 2,950 mm (9 ft 8 in)
- Floor height: 950 mm (3 ft 1 in)
- Doors: 3 pairs per side
- Maximum speed: 120 km/h (75 mph)
- Power output: 125 kW (168 hp) per motor
- Electric system: Overhead line, 20 kV 50 Hz AC
- Current collection: Pantograph
- Bogies: DT72 (motored), TR256 (trailer)
- Safety system: ATS-Ps
- Multiple working: 701 series
- Track gauge: 1,067 mm (3 ft 6 in)

The E721 series (Japanese: E721系) is an AC electric multiple unit (EMU) train type operated by East Japan Railway Company (JR East) on services in the Sendai area of Japan since February 2007.

== Variants ==
- E721-0 series 2-car sets, since February 2007
- E721-500 series 2-car sets, since March 2007
- E721-1000 series 4-car sets, since November 2016
- SAT721 series 2-car sets, since March 2007 (owned by Sendai Airport Transit)
- AB900 series 2-car sets, since July 2019
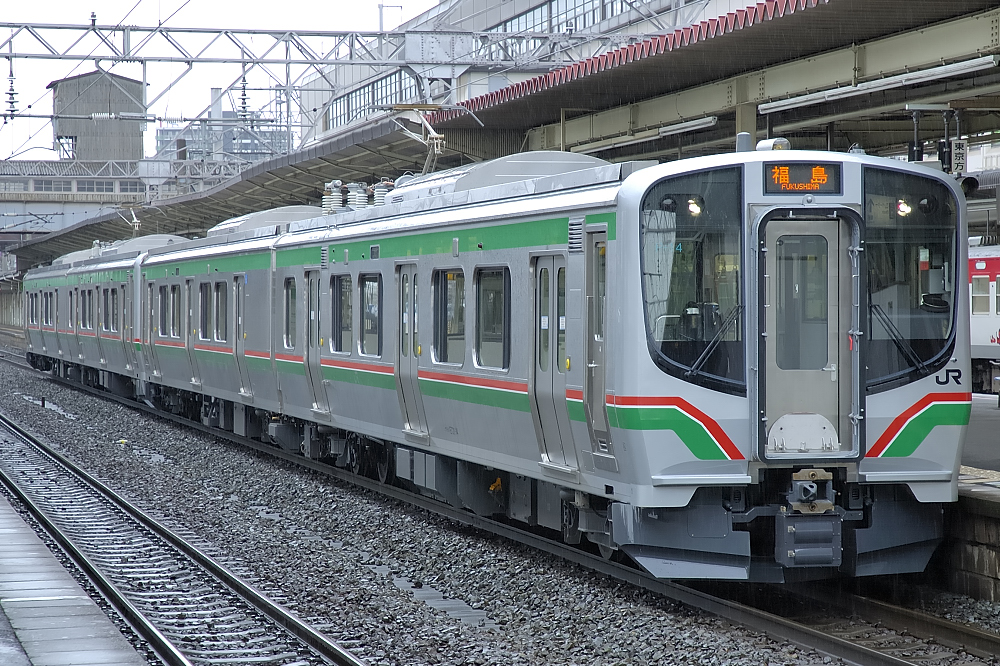
E721-0 series set P-4 in March 2007

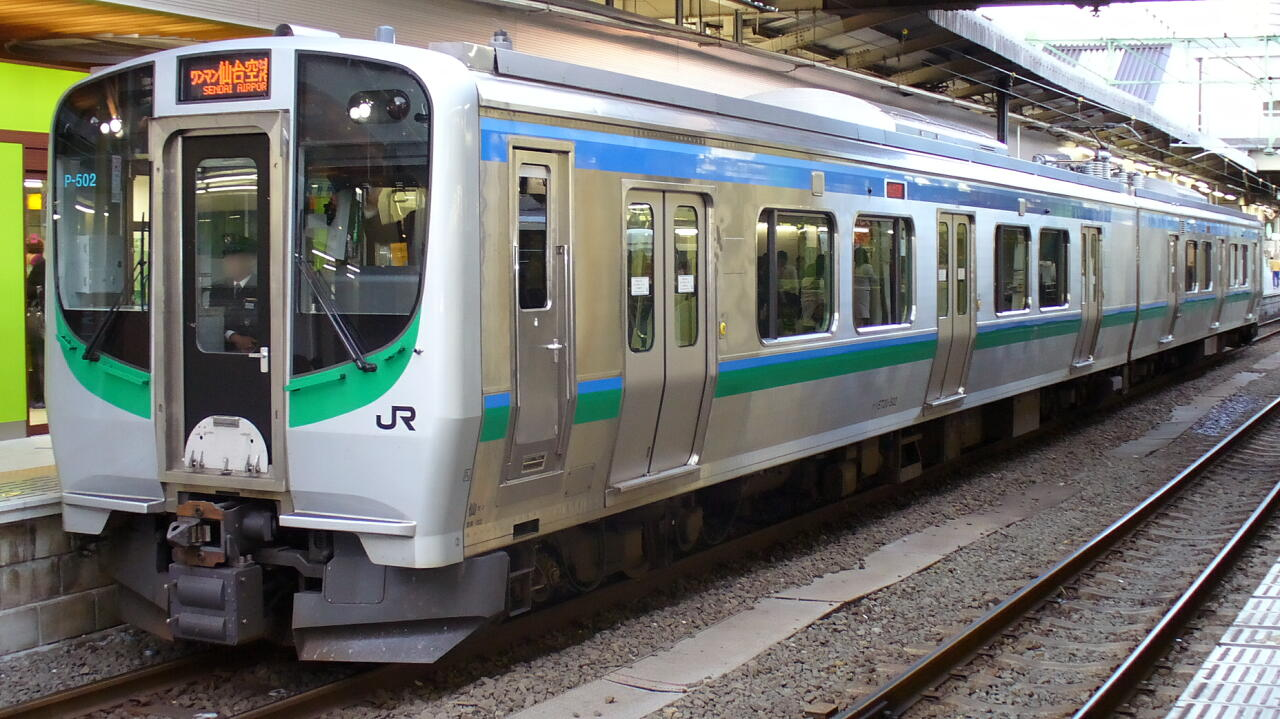
E721-500 series set P-502 in November 2007

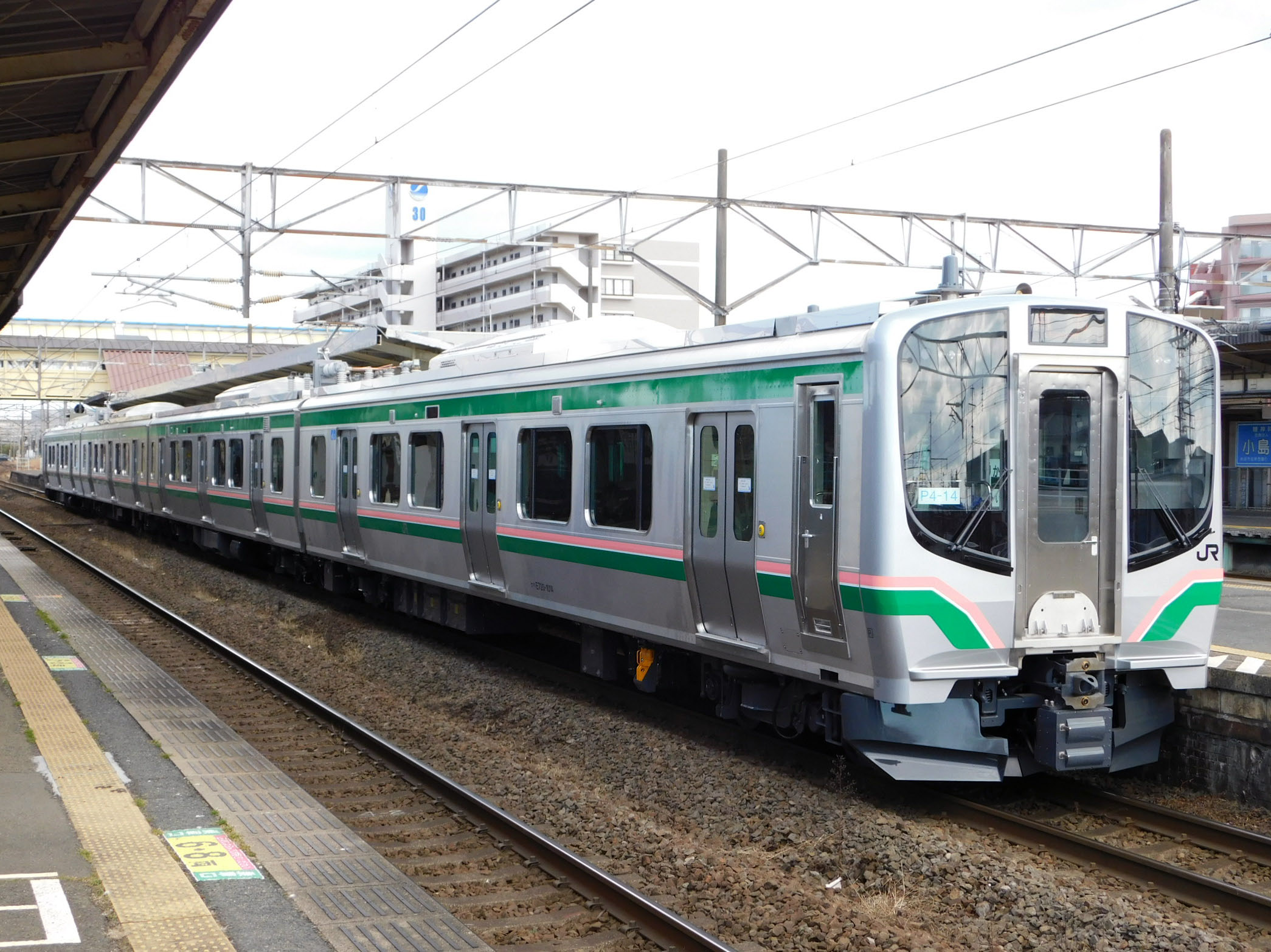
E721-1000 series set P4-14 in January 2017

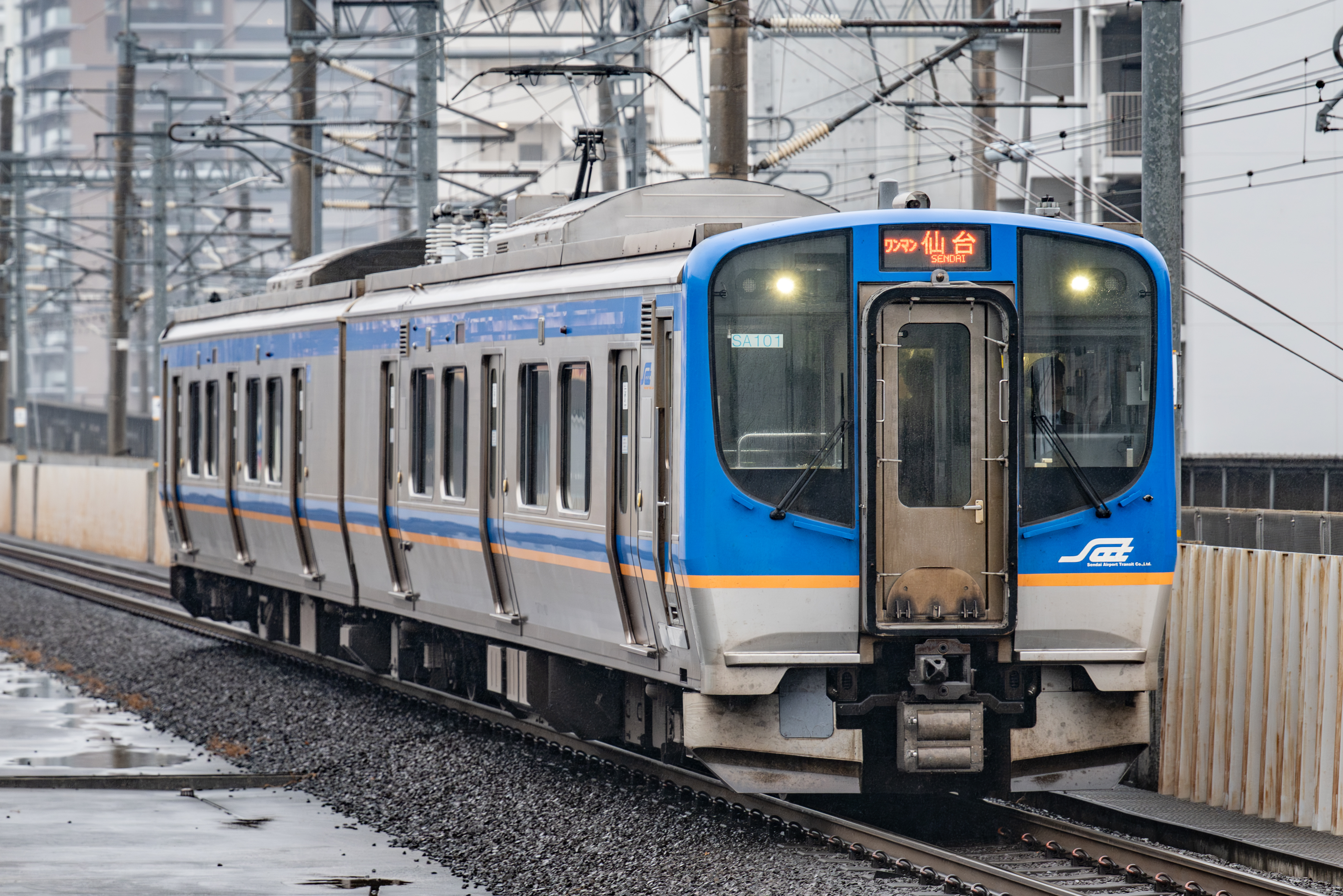
SAT721 series set SA101 in December 2025

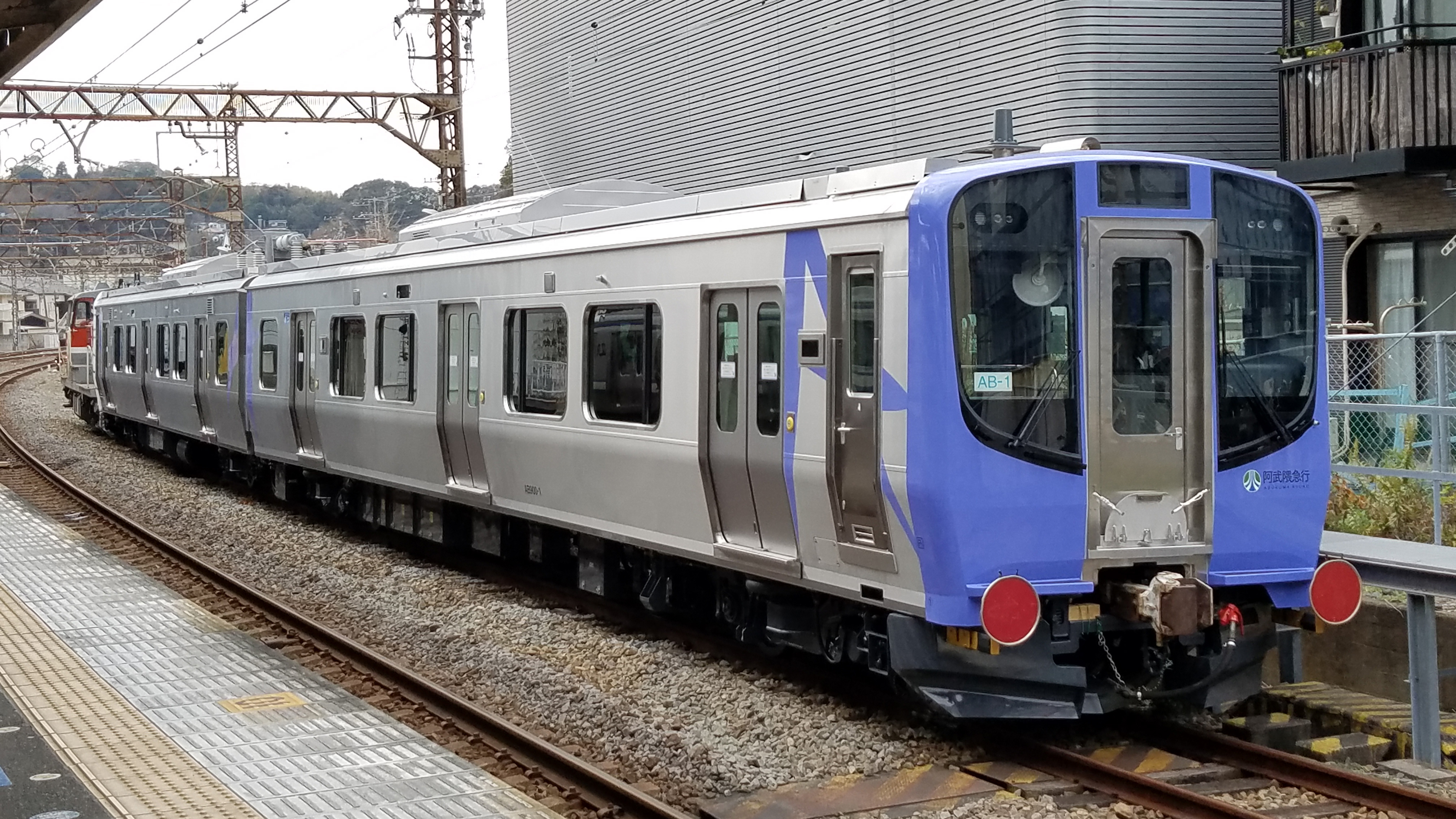
AB900 series set AB-1 on delivery at Zushi Station in February 2019

== Operations ==
- ■ Banetsu West Line (since March 2017)
- ■ Joban Line
- ■ Senzan Line
- ■ Sendai Airport Line (E721-500 series and SAT721 series only)
- ■ Tohoku Main Line
- ■ Abukuma Express Line (AB900 series)

== Formations ==
As of 1 October 2015, the fleet consists of 42 two-car E721-0 series sets (P-2 to P-44), four E721-500 series two-car sets (P-501 to P-504), and three SAT721 series two-car sets (SA101 to SA103), formed as follows with one motored (Mc) and one trailer (Tc') car.

=== E721-0 series ===
Designation	Mc	Tc'
Numbering	KuMoHa E721-xx	KuHa E720-xx

The KuMoHa cars have one PS109 single-arm pantograph. The KuHa cars have a toilet.

=== E721-500 series ===
Designation	Mc	Tc'
Numbering	KuMoHa E721-50x	KuHa E720-50x

The KuMoHa cars have one PS109 single-arm pantograph. The KuHa cars have a toilet.

=== E721-1000 series ===
The 19 four-car E721-1000 series sets (P4-1 to P4-19) are formed as follows, with two motored ("M") cars and two non-powered trailer ("T") cars. The KuHa E720 is located at the southern end.

Designation	Tc'	M	T	Mc
Numbering	KuHa E720-10xx	MoHa E721-10xx	SaHa E721-10xx	KuMoHa E7210-10xx
Weight (t)	34.3	32.0	37.2	39.1
Capacity (seated/total)	50/132	62/152	62/152	56/138

The two motored cars (KuMoHa and MoHa) each have one PS109 single-arm pantograph. The KuHa cars have a toilet.

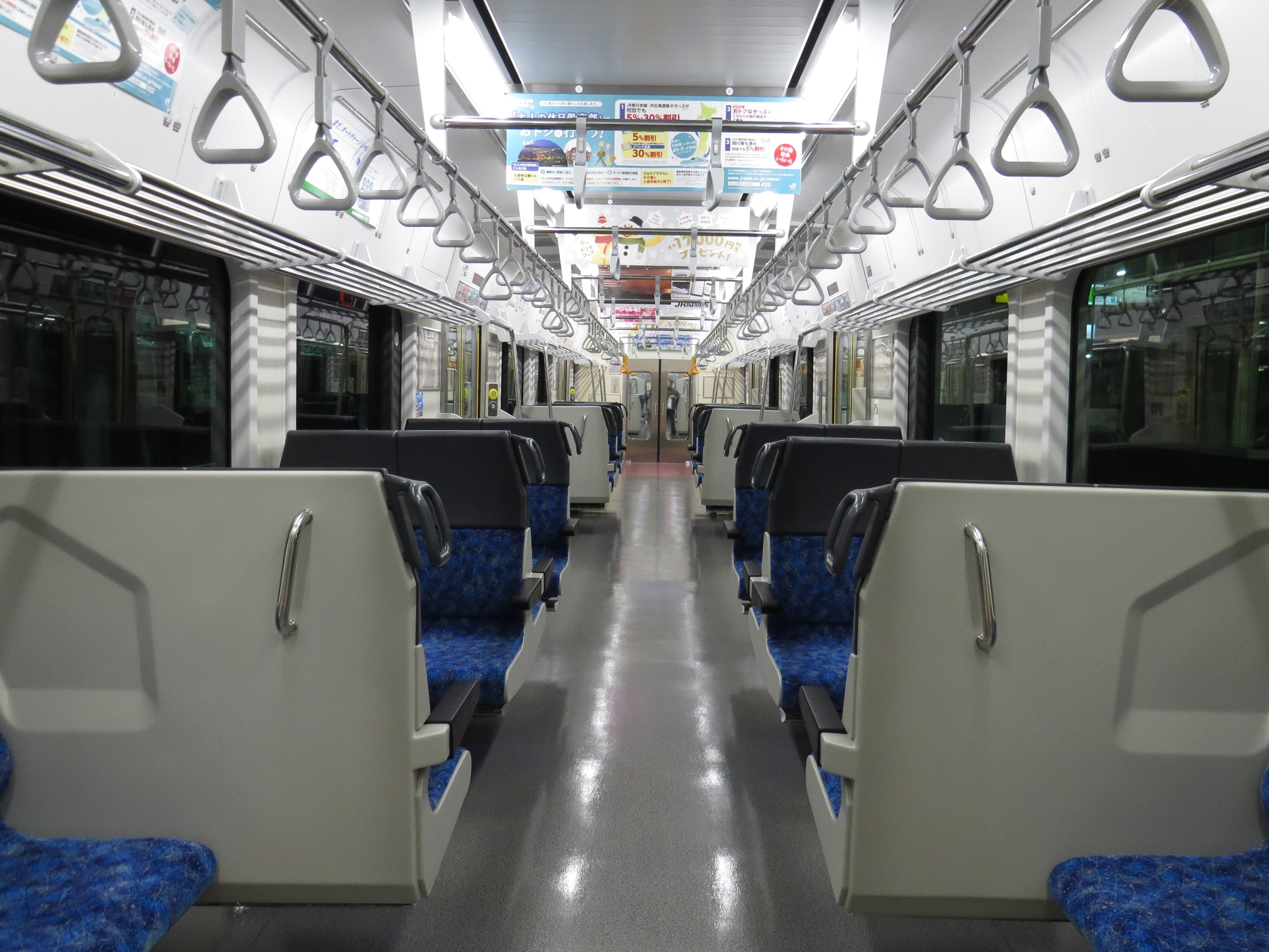
The interior of car KuMoHa E721-1005 of set P4-5 in January 2017

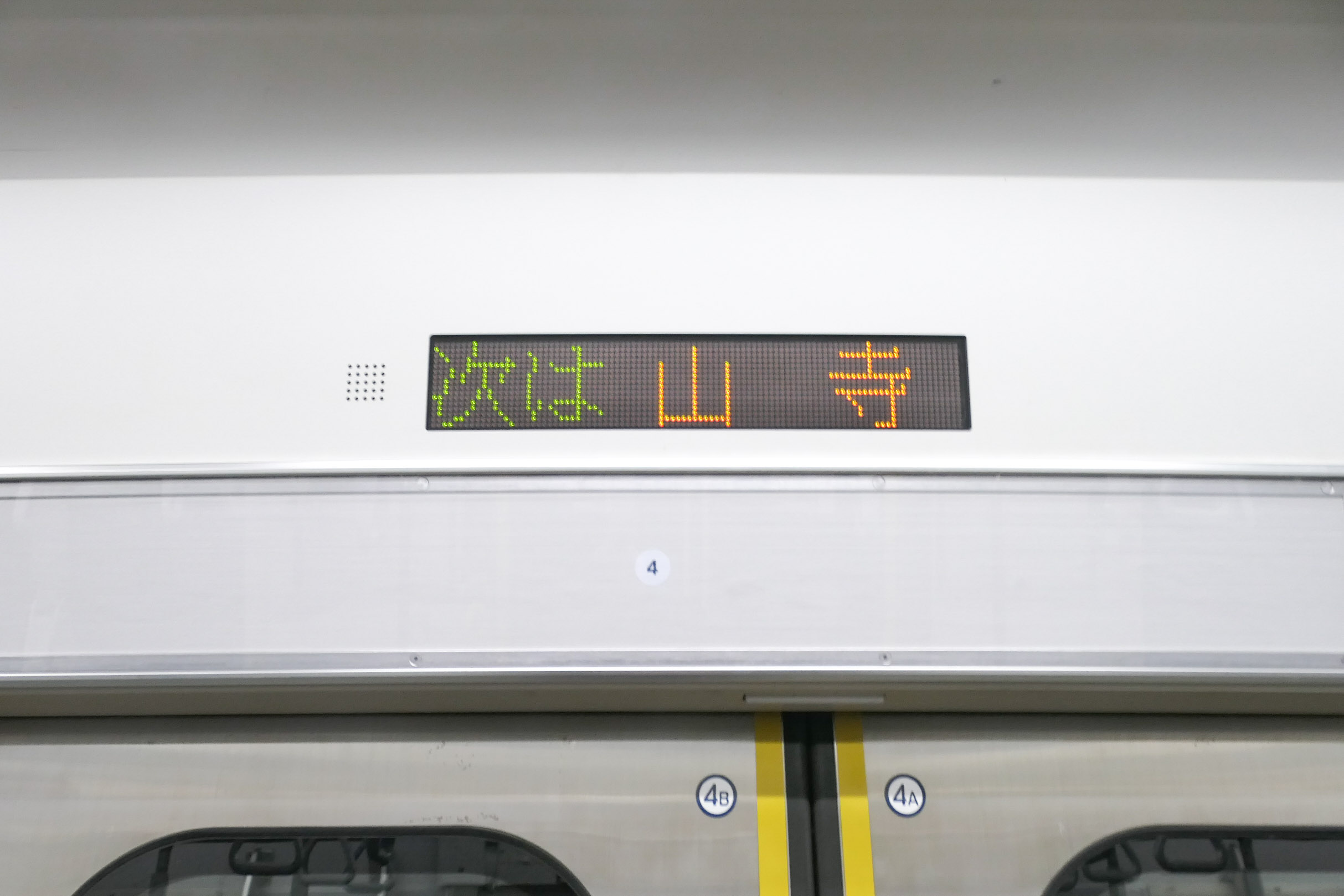
An LED passenger information panel above the doorway in car KuMoHa E721-1006 of set P4-6 in February 2026

=== SAT721 series ===
The two-car SAT721 series sets are formed as follows.

Designation	Mc	Tc'
Numbering	SAT721-10x	SAT720-10x

The KuMoHa cars have one PS109 single-arm pantograph. The KuHa cars have a toilet.

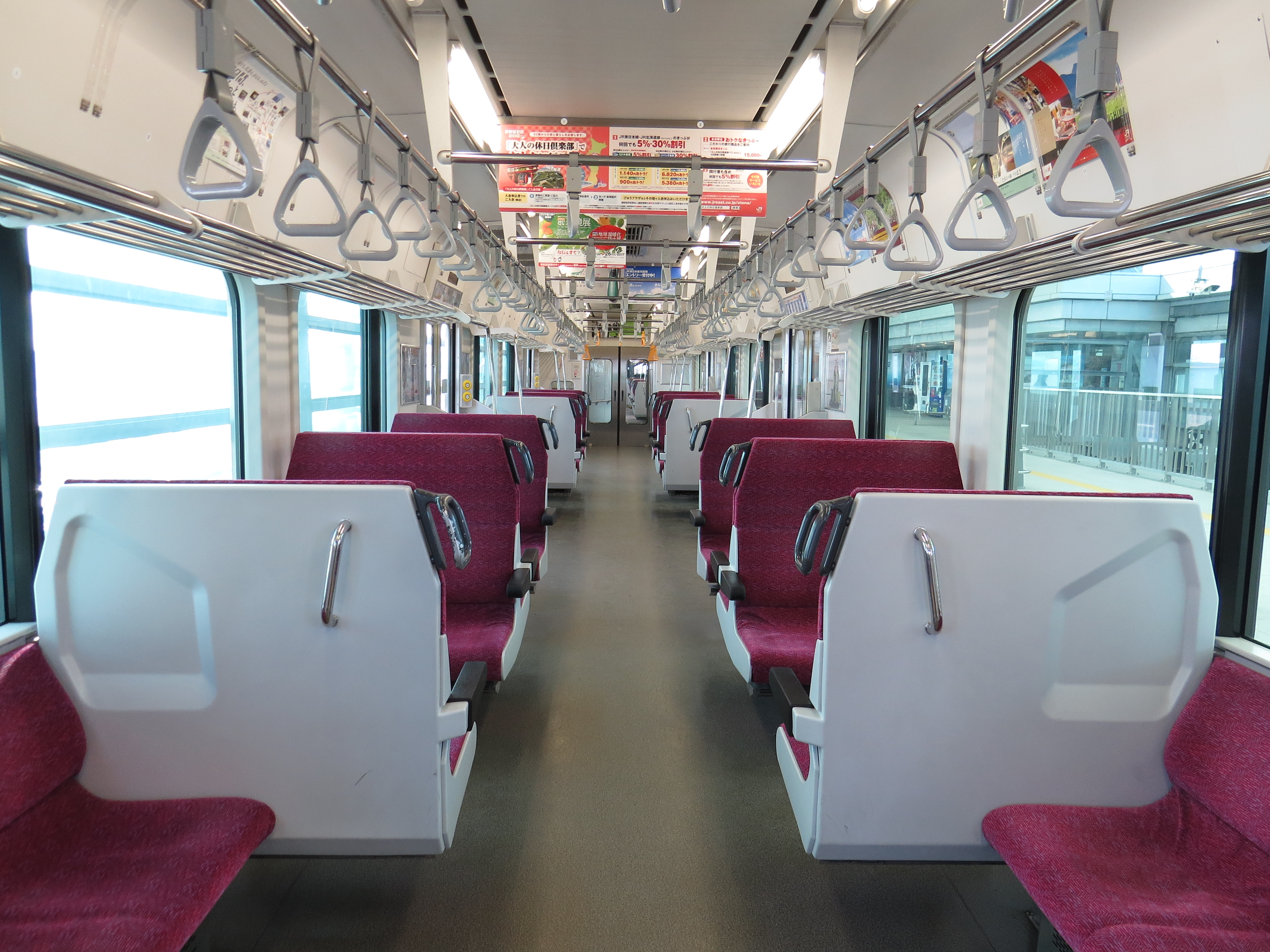
The interior of car SAT721-101 in April 2017

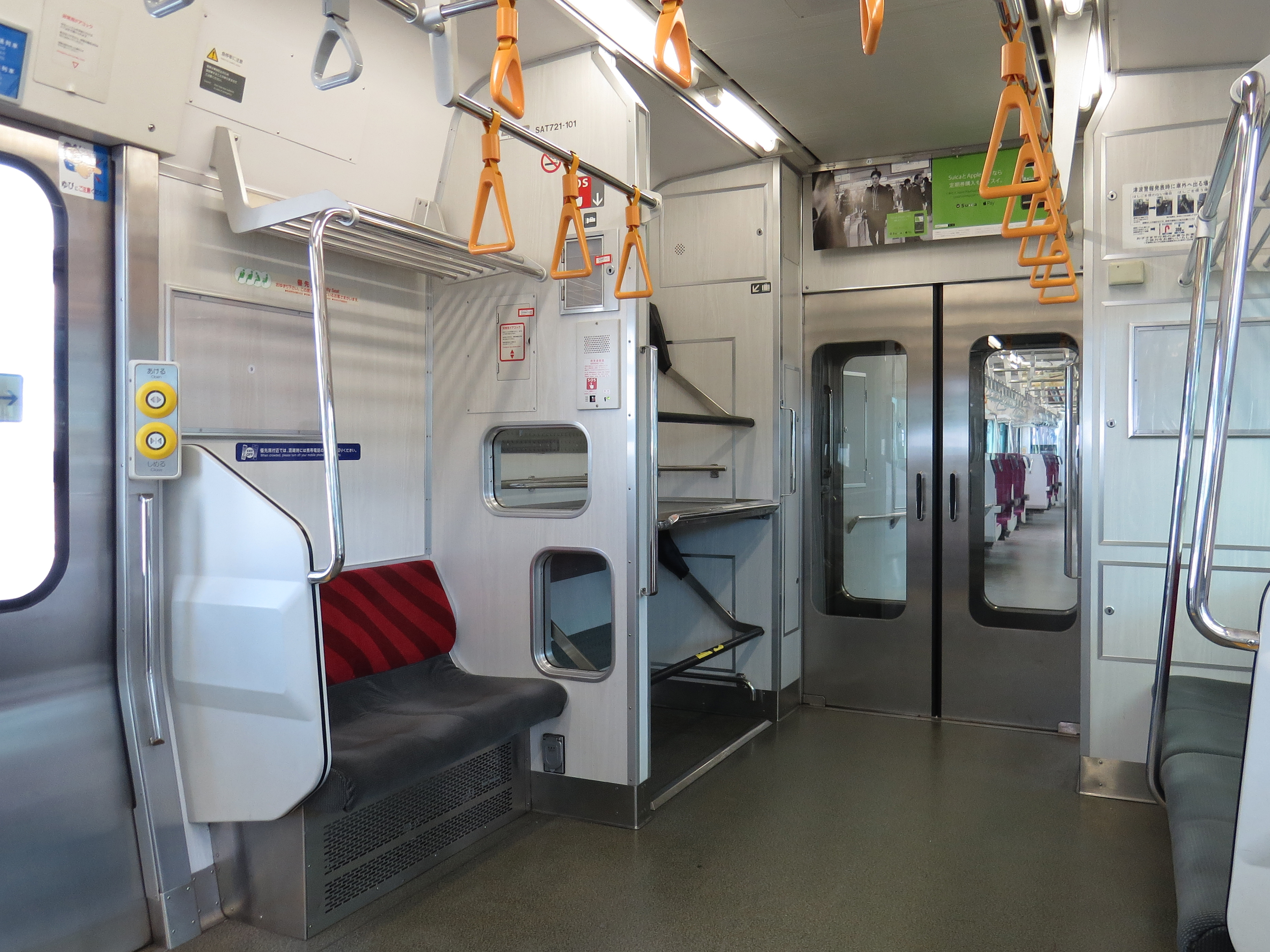
Priority seating and luggage space in car SAT721-101 in April 2017

=== AB900 series ===
The Abukuma Express AB900 series are derived from the E721-500 and SAT721 series used for JR East.

Sets are formed as follows.

Set	Numbering	
AB-1	AB901-1	AB900-1
AB-2	AB901-2	AB900-2
AB-3	AB901-3	AB900-3
AB-4	AB901-4	AB900-4
AB-5	AB901-5	AB900-5

== History ==
The first E721-0 series sets were delivered from December 2006, and entered service on 1 February 2007 on Tohoku Main Line services. The first E721-500 and SAT721 series sets were delivered from February 2006 and entered service on Sendai Airport services on 18 March 2007.

Two sets, P-1 and P-19, were derailed and badly damaged by the 2011 Tōhoku earthquake and tsunami on 11 March 2011 while at Shinchi Station. Both sets were written off and scrapped.

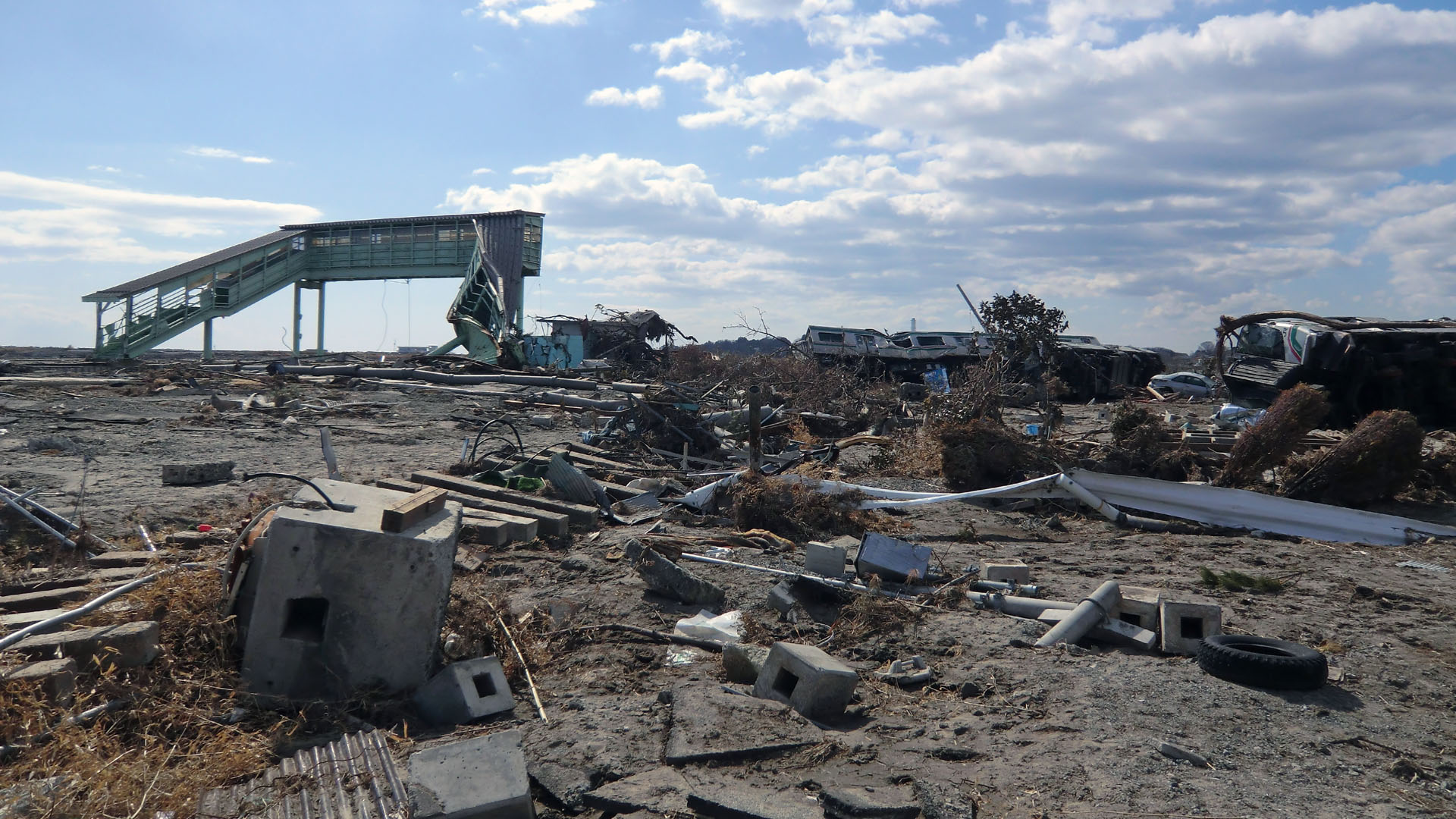
The remains of sets P-1 and P-19 at Shinchi Station after the tsunami in 2011

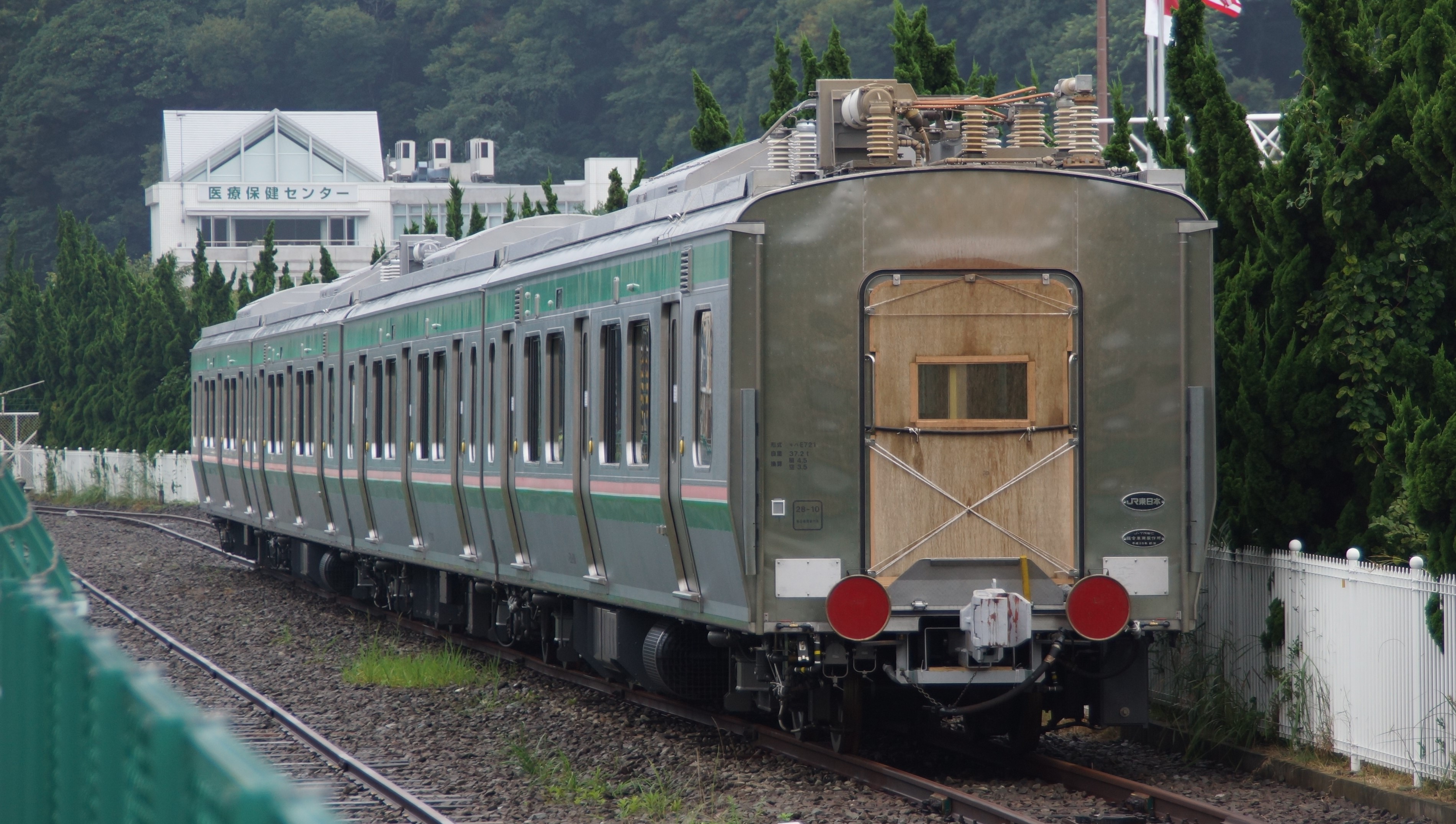
Intermediate cars for the first two E721-1000 sets on delivery from J-TREC Niitsu in September 2016

The first of a fleet of 19 new four-car E721-1000 sets (76 vehicles in total) was introduced on 30 November 2016 on Tohoku Main Line, Joban Line, and Senzan Line services, replacing older 719 series units. The new trains are built by J-TREC, with construction shared between the company's Yokohama and Niitsu factories. These trains feature LED interior lighting.

The first four E721-1000 series intermediate cars were delivered from J-TREC's Niitsu factory to its Yokohama factory in September 2016 to be combined with driving cars built there.

In order to replace their 8100 series trains, Abukuma Express announced the order of new AB900 series trains in summer 2018. They are based on the E721 series, and are the first new trains for Abukuma Express since 1988. The first AB900 series set was delivered in February 2019. It entered service on 1 July 2019.

== Fleet/build details ==
The manufacturers and delivery dates for the fleet are as shown below.

=== E721-0 series ===
Set No.	Manufacturer	Date delivered	Date withdrawn
P-1	Kawasaki Heavy Industries	28 November 2006	12 March 2011 (Note: Destroyed by tsunami on 11 March 2011.)
P-2	Kawasaki Heavy Industries	17 January 2007	
P-3	Kawasaki Heavy Industries	17 January 2007	
P-4	Kawasaki Heavy Industries	17 January 2007	
P-5	Tokyu Car	18 December 2006	
P-6	Tokyu Car	18 December 2006	
P-7	Kawasaki Heavy Industries	15 January 2007	
P-8	Kawasaki Heavy Industries	6 February 2007	
P-9	Kawasaki Heavy Industries	6 February 2007	
P-10	Kawasaki Heavy Industries	23 February 2007	
P-11	Kawasaki Heavy Industries	23 February 2007	
P-12	Tokyu Car	15 January 2007	
P-13	Tokyu Car	15 January 2007	
P-14	Kawasaki Heavy Industries	28 February 2007	
P-15	Kawasaki Heavy Industries	28 February 2007	
P-16	Kawasaki Heavy Industries	8 March 2007	
P-17	Kawasaki Heavy Industries	8 March 2007	
P-18	Kawasaki Heavy Industries	23 March 2007	
P-19	Kawasaki Heavy Industries	23 March 2007	12 March 2011
P-20	Kawasaki Heavy Industries	23 March 2007	
P-21	Kawasaki Heavy Industries	23 March 2007	
P-22	Kawasaki Heavy Industries	17 April 2007	
P-23	Kawasaki Heavy Industries	17 April 2007	
P-24	Kawasaki Heavy Industries	27 April 2007	
P-25	Kawasaki Heavy Industries	27 April 2007	
P-26	Kawasaki Heavy Industries	27 April 2007	
P-27	Kawasaki Heavy Industries	27 April 2007	
P-28	Kawasaki Heavy Industries	31 May 2007	
P-29	Kawasaki Heavy Industries	31 May 2007	
P-30	Kawasaki Heavy Industries	31 May 2007	
P-31	Kawasaki Heavy Industries	31 May 2007	
P-32	Kawasaki Heavy Industries	6 July 2007	
P-33	Kawasaki Heavy Industries	6 July 2007	
P-34	Tokyu Car	30 August 2007	
P-35	Tokyu Car	30 August 2007	
P-36	Tokyu Car	26 September 2007	
P-37	Tokyu Car	26 September 2007	
P-38	Kawasaki Heavy Industries	2 November 2007	
P-39	Kawasaki Heavy Industries	2 November 2007	
P-40	Kawasaki Heavy Industries	13 September 2010	
P-41	Kawasaki Heavy Industries	13 September 2010	
P-42	Kawasaki Heavy Industries	13 September 2010	
P-43	Kawasaki Heavy Industries	13 September 2010	
P-44	Kawasaki Heavy Industries	13 September 2010	

=== E721-500 series ===
The delivery of E721-500 series cars are as follows:

Set No.	Manufacturer	Date delivered
P-501	Kawasaki Heavy Industries	17 February 2006
P-502	Kawasaki Heavy Industries	30 September 2006
P-503	Kawasaki Heavy Industries	30 September 2006
P-504	Tokyu Car	25 October 2006

=== E721-1000 series ===
All manufactured by J-TREC.

Set No.	Date delivered
P4-1	21 October 2016
P4-2	26 October 2016
P4-3	11 November 2016
P4-4	16 November 2016
P4-5	28 November 2016
P4-6	1 December 2016
P4-7	6 December 2016
P4-8	14 December 2016
P4-9	27 December 2016
P4-10	26 December 2016
P4-11	
P4-12	
P4-13	
P4-14	
P4-15	
P4-16	
P4-17	
P4-18	
P4-19	

=== SAT721 series ===
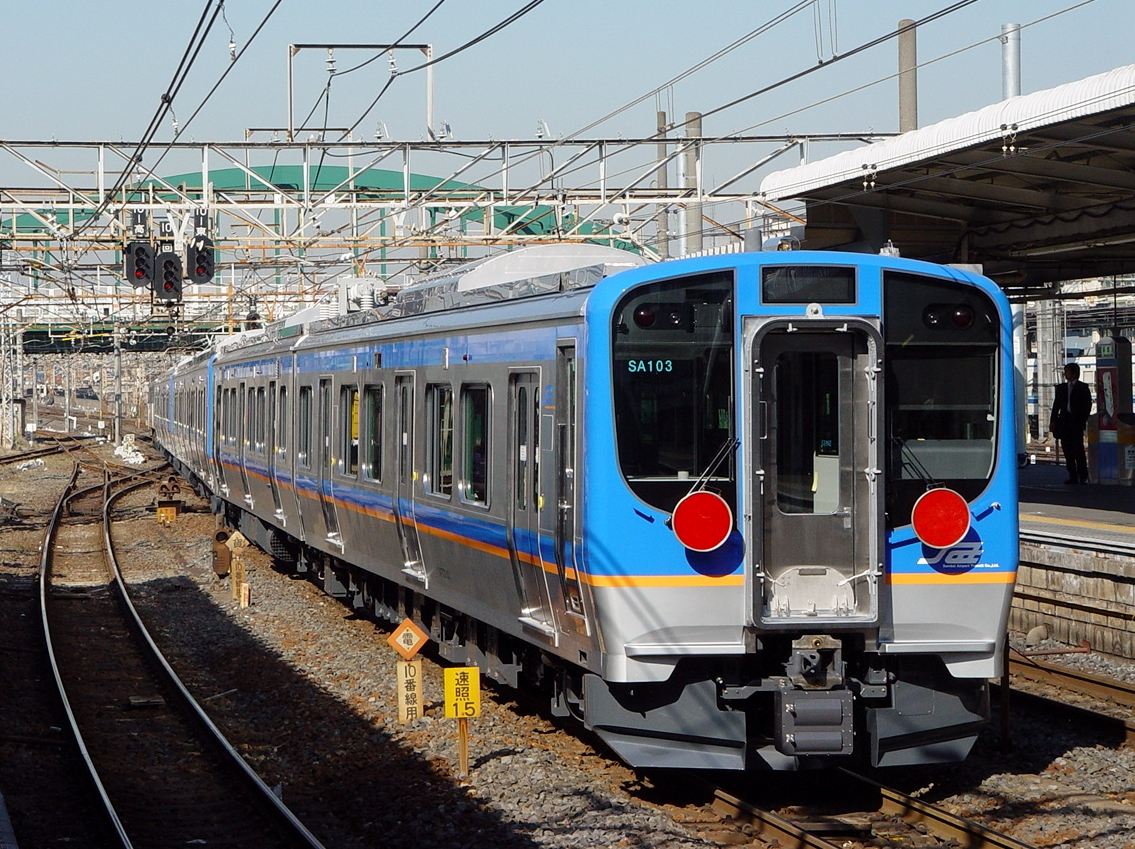
The three SAT721 series units being delivered in November 2006

All sets are manufactured by Kawasaki and delivered as of 20 November 2006.

Set No.
SA101
SA102
SA103

=== AB900 series ===
All sets are manufactured by J-TREC.

Set No.	Date delivered
AB-1	21 February 2019
AB-2	February 2020
AB-3	25 January 2022
AB-4	
AB-5	

== See also ==
- Aoimori 703 series, a derivative for use on the Aoimori Railway
- Railway electrification in Japan
