= E723 series =

Japanese electric multiple unit train type

- In service: 2026–present
- Manufacturer: Kawasaki Railcar Manufacturing
- Replaced: 719-5000 series
- Entered service: 19 September 2026
- Number under construction: 18 vehicles (9 sets)
- Number built: 4 vehicles (2 sets)
- Formation: 2 cars per trainset
- Fleet numbers: B-1 – B-11
- Operator: JR East
- Line served: ■ Ōu Main Line

Specifications
- Car body construction: Stainless steel
- Car length: 19,500 mm (64 ft 0 in)
- Width: 2,800 mm (9 ft 2 in)
- Doors: 3 per side
- Traction system: Variable-frequency
- Track gauge: 1,435 mm (4 ft 8 1/2 in)

Notes/references
- Specifications

The E723 series (E723系, E723-kei) is an electric multiple unit train type operated by East Japan Railway Company (JR East) on Ōu Main Line services between Yamagata and Shinjo since 2026. Eleven two-car sets are to be built to replace the 719-5000 series fleet.

== E723-5000 series ==
The E723-5000 series was developed for use on the standard-gauge section of the Ōu Main Line. The first two sets, B-1 and B-2, were delivered from the Kawasaki Railcar Manufacturing Hyogo plant in April 2026.

The E723-5000 series entered service on 19 September 2026.

=== Interior ===
Passenger accommodation consists of longitudinal seating throughout. Both cars have an accessible "free space".
