= List of mergers in Yamagata Prefecture =

Here is a list of mergers in Yamagata Prefecture, Japan since the Heisei era.

== Mergers from April 1, 1999 to Present ==
- On July 1, 2005 - The towns of Amarume and Tachikawa (both from Higashitagawa District) were merged to create the town of Shōnai.
- On October 1, 2005 - The old city of Tsuruoka absorbed the towns of Fujishima, Haguro and Kushibiki, the village of Asahi (all from Higashitagawa District) and the town of Atsumi (from Nishitagawa District) to create the new and expanded city of Tsuruoka. Nishitagawa District was dissolved as a result of this merger. (Merger Information Page)
- On November 1, 2005 - The old city of Sakata absorbed the towns of Hirata, Matsuyama and Yawata (all from Akumi District) to create the new and expanded city of Sakata. (Merger Information Page)
