= Higashitagawa District =

District in Yamagata prefecture, Japan

Coordinates: 38.785°N 139.966°E

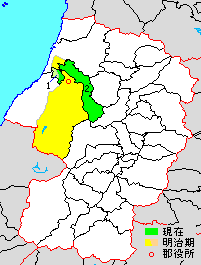
Map showing original extent of Higashitagawa District in Yamagata Prefecture yellow & green area=original extent in Meiji period; green=present area. 1=Mikawa, 2=Shōnai

Higashitagawa District (東田川郡, Higashitagawa-gun) is a rural district located in Yamagata Prefecture, Japan. As of October 2013, the district has an estimated population of 29,957 and an area of 282.47 km^{2}. Much of the city of Tsuruoka and a portion of the city of Sakata was formerly part of Higashitagawa District.

== Towns and villages ==
- Mikawa
- Shōnai

== History ==
Tagawa County was an ancient place name in part of Dewa Province. It was divided into Higashitagawa District and Nishitagawa District after the Meiji restoration. Under the Tokugawa shogunate, much of the area of both districts were ruled as part of Tsuruoka Domain. The area became part of Yamagata Prefecture in 1876. At that time, Higashitagawa District consisted of 259 villages.

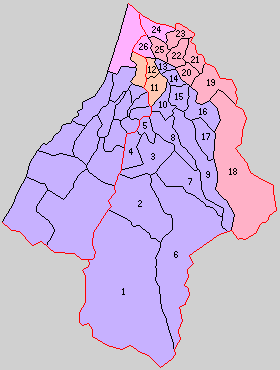
Historic Map of Higashitagawa District: 1. Ōizumi; 2. Hongō; 3. Yamazoe; 4. Kogane; 5. Itsuki; 6. Azuma; 7. Kurokawa; 8. Hirose; 9. Izumi; 10. Watamae; 11. Yokoyama; 12. Oshikiri; 13. Naganuma; 14. Yaejima; 15. Fujishima; 16. Tōei; 17. Toge; 18. Tachiyazawa; 19. Karikawa; 20. Izaai; 21. Yamato; 22. Shōman; 23. Amarume; 24. Niibori; 25. Sakae; 26. Hirono; Purple=Tsuruoka City Pink=Sakata City Red=Shōnai Town Orange=Mikawa Town

With the establishment of the municipality system on April 1, 1889, the district was consolidated into 26 villages.

- On May 5, 1918, Amarume was raised to town status
- On May 19, 1922, Fujishima was raised to town status
- On April 1, 1937, Karikawa was raised to town status
- On October 1, 1954, Karikawa merged with the neighboring villages of Kiyokawa and Tachiyazawa to become the town of Tachikawa

On February 1, 1955, the villages of Izumi, Hirose and Toge merged to form the town of Haguro.

- On December 1, 1966, Kushibiki was raised to town status
- On June 1, 1968, Mikawa was raised to town status
- On July 1, 2005 the towns of Amarume and Tachikawa merged to form the new town of Shōnai.
- On October 1, 2005 the city of Tsuruoka, the towns of Fujishima, Haguro and Kushibiki and the village of Asahi, and the town of Atsumi from Nishitagawa District merged into Tsuruoka.
