= Shonai Airport =

Shonai Airport 庄内空港
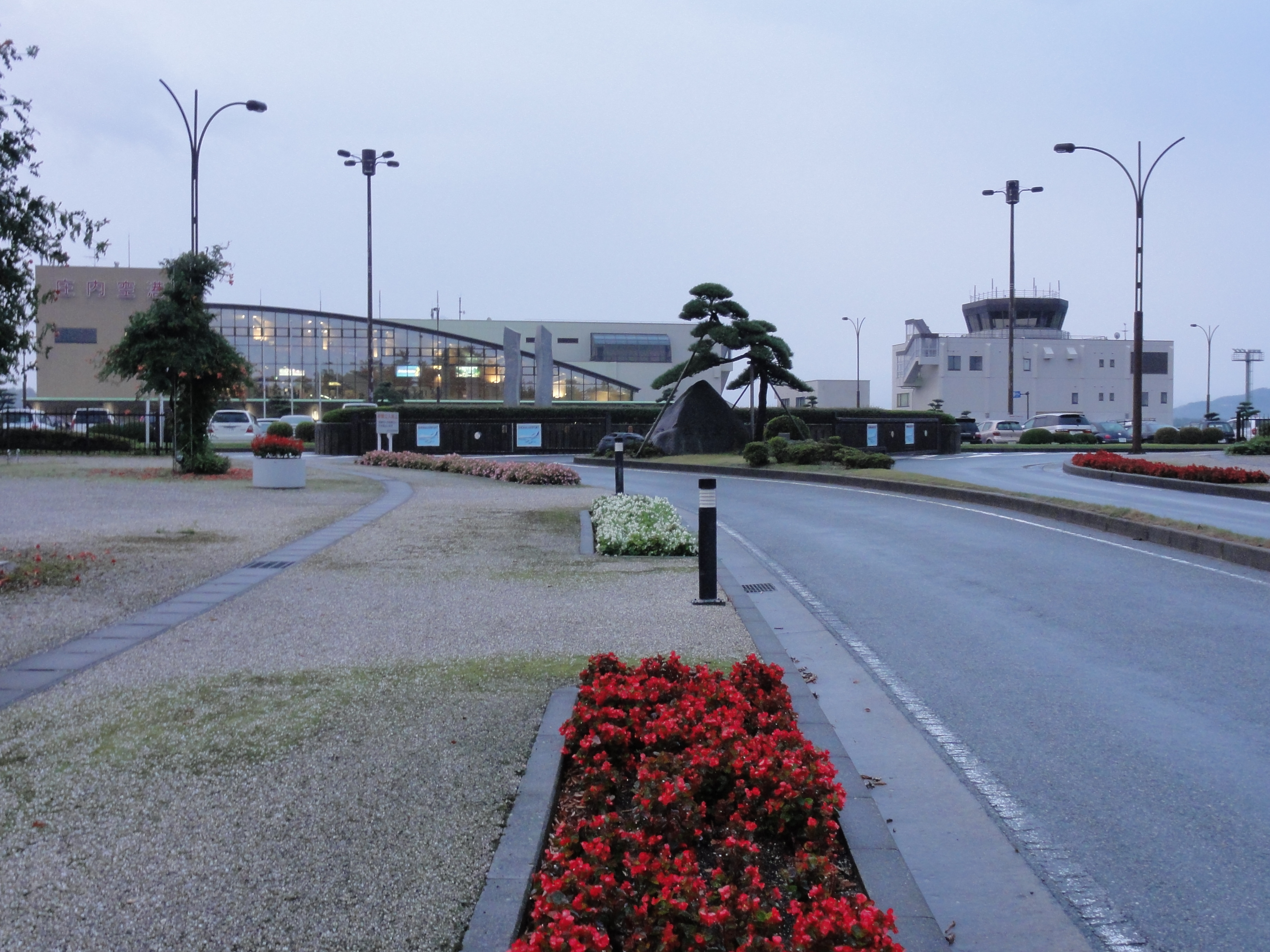
- IATA: SYO; ICAO: RJSY

Summary
- Airport type: Public
- Serves: Sakata, Yamagata
- Location: Sakata, Yamagata, Japan
- Elevation AMSL: 72 ft (22 m)
- Coordinates: 38°48′44″N 139°47′14″E
- Website: www.shonai-airport.co.jp

Map
- Location in Japan RJSY (Japan)

Runways
Direction	Length		Surface
Direction	m	ft	Surface
09/27	2,000	6,562	Asphalt concrete

Statistics (2015)
- Passengers: 364,815
- Cargo (metric tonnes): 533
- Aircraft movement: 4,211
- Source: Japanese Ministry of Land, Infrastructure, Transport and Tourism

Shonai Airport (庄内空港, Shōnai Kūkō) (IATA: SYO, ICAO: RJSY) is an airport, located in Sakata and Tsuruoka, which are cities facing the Sea of Japan in Yamagata Prefecture, Japan.

== History ==
The airport opened in 1991 after lobbying efforts by local chambers of commerce, as the area was highly isolated from the major cities of Tokyo and Osaka, requiring half a day of travel to reach either. All Nippon Airways (ANA) initially operated service to both Tokyo (Haneda) and Osaka (Itami), but cancelled the Osaka service in 2009. There was also nonstop service to Sapporo from 1995 to 2007.

Seiko Epson has also used the airport for weekly employee charter flights to and from Matsumoto since 1997.

In December 2012, an ANA flight landing from Tokyo overran the runway at Shonai. There were no fatalities, but the airport was closed for the following day.

== Airlines and destinations ==
Airlines	Destinations
All Nippon Airways	Tokyo–Haneda

== Transportation ==
Bus transportation servicing Shonai Airport
Bus stop	No.	Via	Destination	Company	Note
Airport Terminal bus stop	Sakata―Yunohama Line	Tohoku University of Community Service and Science	Sakata Station (Yamagata)	Shonai Kotsu	
Airport Terminal bus stop	Sakata―Yunohama Line		Tsuruoka Station	Shonai Kotsu	
Hamanaka Gakko mae bus stop	Airport Limousine Bus	Sakata Station (Yamagata)	Sakata Koryo Koko mae	Shonai Kotsu	It takes about 10 minutes from here to the bus stop on foot.
Hamanaka Gakko mae bus stop	Airport Limousine Bus		Yunohama Onsen	Shonai Kotsu	It takes about 10 minutes from here to the bus stop on foot.
