= Makiko Mori =

Makiko Mori (森 万紀子; December 19, 1934 – before November 17, 1992) was a Japanese novelist. She won the 1980 Izumi Kyōka Prize for Literature for her book Yuki Onna (雪女).

== Early life and education ==
Mori was born Eiko Matsuura on December 19, 1934 in Sakata, Japan. She was the second of three children. Her father was a physician and died when she was six years old. Mori began suffering from rheumatism when she was 10 years old. She graduated from Yamagata Prefectural Sakata Higashi High School in 1953. Her mother died when she was 19 years old. Mori left home after her mother's death and moved to Kobe, then Tokyo. She began reading a lot, especially the works of Jean-Paul Sartre, Franz Kafka, Kōbō Abe, and Yutaka Haniya.

== Career ==
Mori made her debut as a writer in 1965 with the novel Tandokusha (単独者), which won the Bungakukai New Writer's Award and was nominated for the Akutagawa Prize. Several of her other books were also nominated for this award, such as Kyori (距離) in 1965, Mitsuyaku (密約) in 1969, and Kiiroi Shōfu (黄色い娼婦) in 1971. Three of her works were nominated for the Women's Literature Award. In 1980 her book Yuki Onna (雪女) won the Izumi Kyōka Prize for Literature.

Mori lived a solitary life. Her death was discovered on November 17, 1992. Throughout her career she wrote nine books. Mitsuko Takahashi later wrote a book about her life titled "Yuki Onna" Densetsu Nazo no Sakka Mori Makiko (「雪女」伝説 謎の作家・森万紀子).

== Style ==
Mori's style was known for her isolated female protagonists who live depressing lives with nihilistic outlooks. They are often emotionally adrift and wander with little sense of identity. Many of her works are about isolation and the inevitability of death.
