= Ogisai Kurokawa Noh =

Coordinates: 38.6654°N 139.8742°E

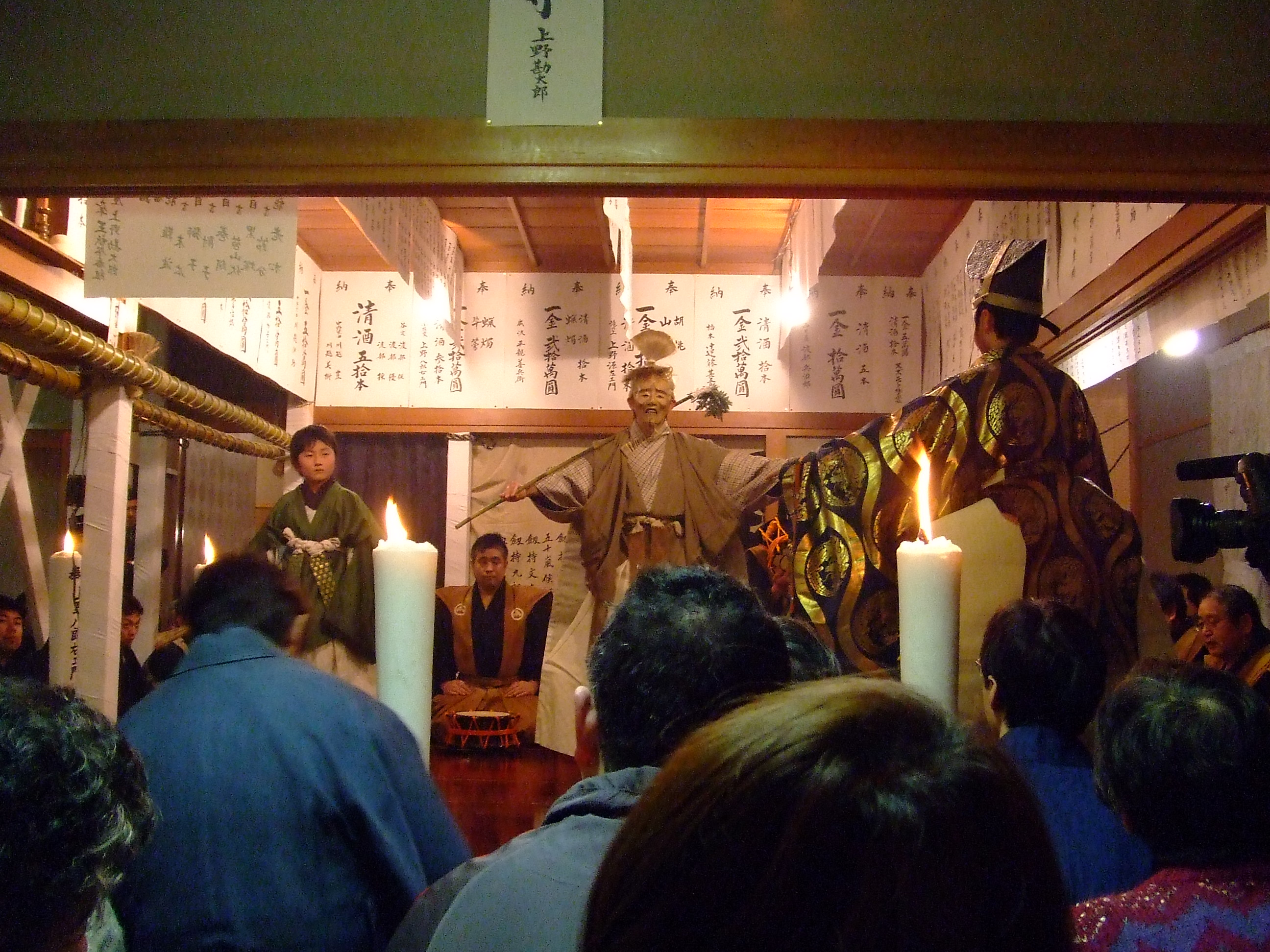
A performance held in a specially modified residential house during the February 2007 Kurokawa nō festival.

Ogisai Kurokawa noh (王祗祭黒川能, Ōgisai Kurokawa nō) (or simply Kurokawa noh) is a noh festival in Kushibiki in Tsuruoka, Yamagata Prefecture, Japan. It became an official Intangible Cultural Asset in 1976.
