= Mikawa, Yamagata =

Mikawa 三川町
- Town
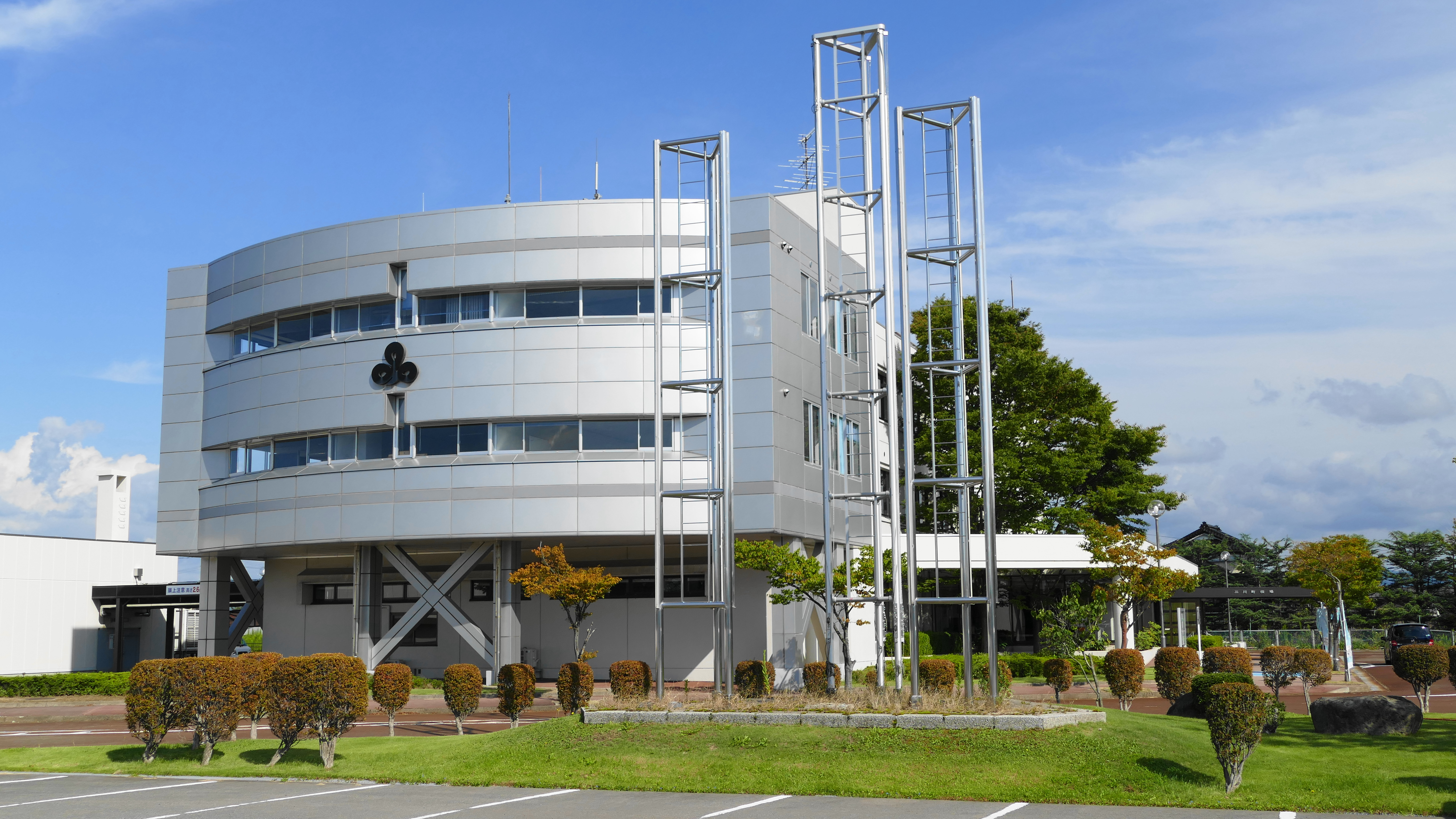
- Mikawa town hall

- Flag Seal
- Interactive map of Mikawa
- Coordinates: 38°47′40.5″N 139°50′58.9″E
- Country: Japan
- Region: Tōhoku
- Prefecture: Yamagata
- District: Higashitagawa

Area
  - Total: 33.22 km^{2} (12.83 sq mi)

Population (March 31, 2023)
  - Total: 7,282
  - Density: 219.2/km^{2} (567.7/sq mi)
- Time zone: UTC+9 (Japan Standard Time)
- Phone number: 0235-66-3111
- Address: 85 Nishida, Yokoyama Aze Mikawa-machi, Higashitagawa-gun, Yamagata-ken 997-1301
- Climate: Cfa
- Website: Official website
- Symbols
- Flower: Brassica rapa
- Tree: Zelkova serrata

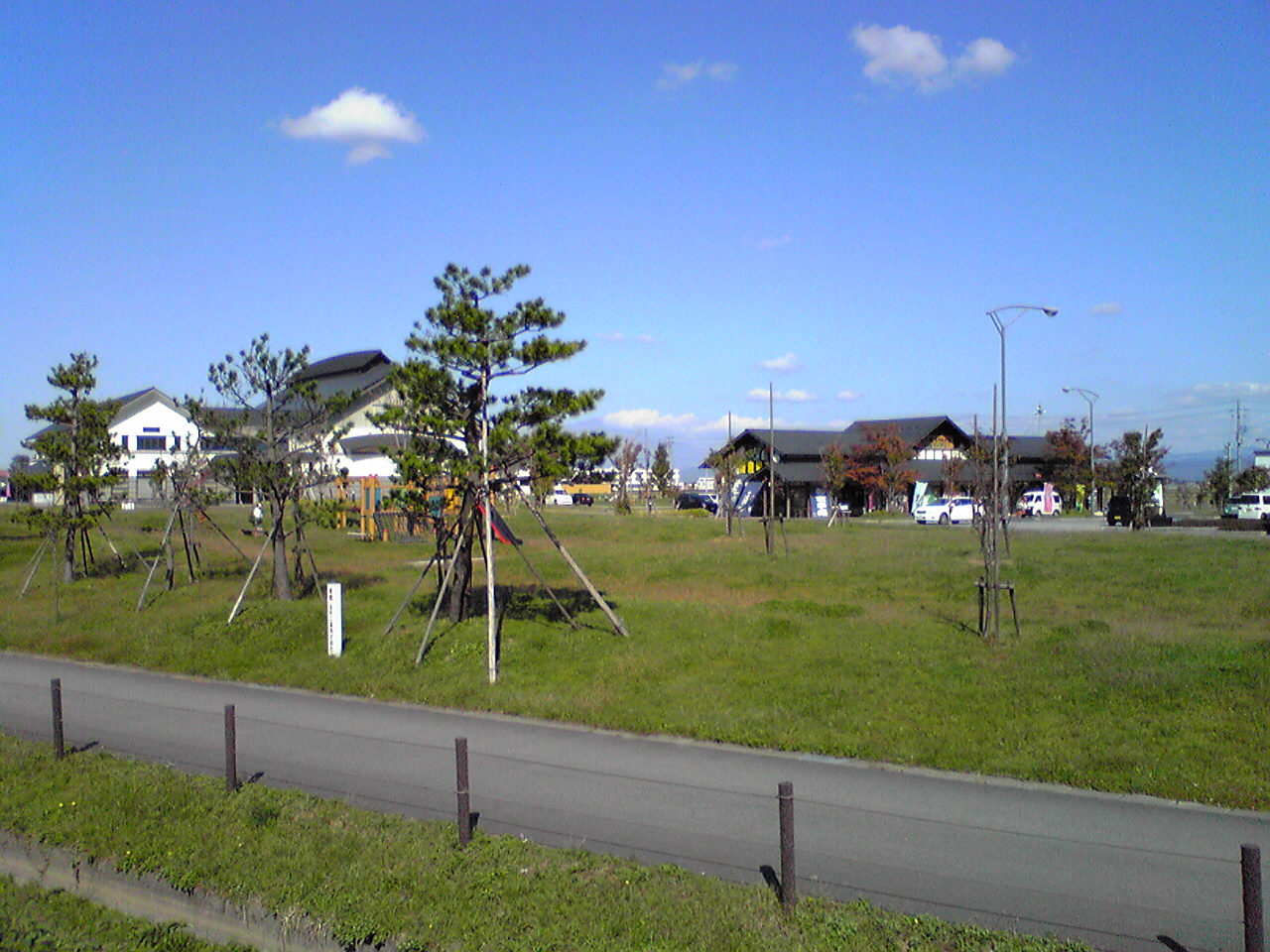
Shonai Roadside Station

Mikawa (三川町, Mikawa-machi) is a town located in Yamagata Prefecture, Japan. As of 31 March 2023, the town had an estimated population of 7,282 in 2478 households, and a population density of 220 persons per km^{2}. The total area of the town is 33.22 square kilometres (13 sq mi). Mikawa is the seat of the Yamagata Prefectural Government's |"general branch office" responsible for the unofficial "Shōnai Region", corresponding to northwestern Yamagata. It is also the seat of the central government's MLIT transportation branch office that licenses the Shōnai vehicle registration plate for the same region.

== Geography ==
Mikawa is located in the coastal plains of northeast Yamagata Prefecture, sandwiched between much larger Tsuruoka and Sakata. There are no mountains the entire town is located in the Shōnai Plain. Mount Chōkai to the north and Mount Gassan relocated to the east-southeast. The main urban center is concentrated near Yamagata Prefectural Route 333 (formerly Japan National Route 7), which runs along the Akagawa River. The border with the former Fujishima Town was set along the Fujishima River at the eastern end of the town, and the boundaries with Sakata City and Tsuruoka City in the west are along the flow of the Oyama River.

=== Neighboring municipalities ===
Yamagata Prefecture

- Sakata
- Shōnai
- Tsuruoka

=== Climate ===
Mikawa has a humid continental climate (Köppen climate classification Cfa) with large seasonal temperature differences, with warm to hot (and often humid) summers and cold (sometimes severely cold) winters. Precipitation is significant throughout the year, but is heaviest from August to October. The average annual temperature in Mikawa is 12.5 °C (54.5 °F). The average annual rainfall is 1,810.7 mm (71.29 in) with July as the wettest month. The temperatures are highest on average in August, at around 24.9 °C (76.8 °F), and lowest in January and February, at around 1.8 °C (35.2 °F).

Climate data for Mikawa (2003−2020 normals, extremes 2003−present)
Month	Jan	Feb	Mar	Apr	May	Jun	Jul	Aug	Sep	Oct	Nov	Dec	Year
Record high °C (°F)	15.3 (59.5)	21.7 (71.1)	24.1 (75.4)	27.9 (82.2)	30.9 (87.6)	34.2 (93.6)	37.1 (98.8)	38.4 (101.1)	36.3 (97.3)	30.6 (87.1)	24.3 (75.7)	17.7 (63.9)	38.4 (101.1)
Mean daily maximum °C (°F)	4.4 (39.9)	5.0 (41.0)	8.7 (47.7)	14.1 (57.4)	19.7 (67.5)	23.7 (74.7)	26.8 (80.2)	29.1 (84.4)	25.5 (77.9)	19.5 (67.1)	13.6 (56.5)	7.5 (45.5)	16.5 (61.7)
Daily mean °C (°F)	1.8 (35.2)	1.8 (35.2)	4.7 (40.5)	9.3 (48.7)	15.1 (59.2)	19.5 (67.1)	23.1 (73.6)	24.9 (76.8)	21.1 (70.0)	15.1 (59.2)	9.6 (49.3)	4.3 (39.7)	12.5 (54.5)
Mean daily minimum °C (°F)	−1.2 (29.8)	−1.6 (29.1)	0.5 (32.9)	4.4 (39.9)	10.5 (50.9)	15.6 (60.1)	19.9 (67.8)	21.2 (70.2)	17.0 (62.6)	10.5 (50.9)	5.3 (41.5)	1.0 (33.8)	8.6 (47.5)
Record low °C (°F)	−9.0 (15.8)	−11.3 (11.7)	−7.6 (18.3)	−2.5 (27.5)	1.6 (34.9)	7.3 (45.1)	10.0 (50.0)	13.6 (56.5)	6.5 (43.7)	1.7 (35.1)	−3.2 (26.2)	−5.6 (21.9)	−11.3 (11.7)
Average precipitation mm (inches)	110.9 (4.37)	72.8 (2.87)	97.3 (3.83)	95.4 (3.76)	97.8 (3.85)	102.7 (4.04)	220.4 (8.68)	205.1 (8.07)	172.9 (6.81)	186.6 (7.35)	194.3 (7.65)	192.9 (7.59)	1,810.7 (71.29)
Average precipitation days (≥ 1.0 mm)	18.8	14.9	15.5	12.0	10.8	9.3	14.1	11.8	12.4	14.9	18.8	22.3	175.6
Source: Japan Meteorological Agency

== Demographics ==
Per Japanese census data, the population of Mikawa has declined gradually over the past 70 years.

Historical population
Year	Pop.	±% p.a.
1920	9,202	—
1930	9,714	+0.54%
1940	9,678	−0.04%
1950	10,593	+0.91%
1960	10,323	−0.26%
1970	8,864	−1.51%
1980	8,479	−0.44%
1990	8,263	−0.26%
2000	7,879	−0.47%
2010	7,731	−0.19%
2020	7,601	−0.17%

== History ==
The area of present-day Mikawa was part of ancient Dewa Province. After the start of the Meiji period, the area became part of Higashitagawa District, Yamagata Prefecture. The villages of Yokoyama and Oshikiri and the village of Togō Village in Nishitagawa District were established with the creation of the modern municipalities system on April 1, 1889. The three villages merged to form the village of Mikawa on January 1, 1955. Mikawa was elevated to town status on June 1, 1968.

== Government ==
Mikawa has a mayor-council form of government with a directly elected mayor and a unicameral city council of ten members. Mikawa, collectively with the town of Shōnai, contributes one member to the Yamagata Prefectural Assembly. In terms of national politics, the town is part of the Yamagata 3rd district of the lower house of the Diet of Japan.

== Economy ==
The economy of Mikawa is based on agriculture.

== Education ==
Mikawa has three public elementary schools and one public middle school operated by the town government. The town does not have a high school.

== Transportation ==
=== Railway ===
Mikawa does not have any passenger railway service. The nearest stations are Tsuruoka Station, Fujishima Station, and Nishibukuro Station on the JR East Uetsu Main Line.

=== Highway ===
- National Route 7

== International relations ==
=== Sister cities ===
- Aga, Niigata, Japan
- (United States) McMinnville, Tennessee, USA

== Noted people from Mikawa ==
- Kōsō Abe – Imperial Japanese Navy admiral
- Hikaru Okuizumi – author
