= Port of Sakata =

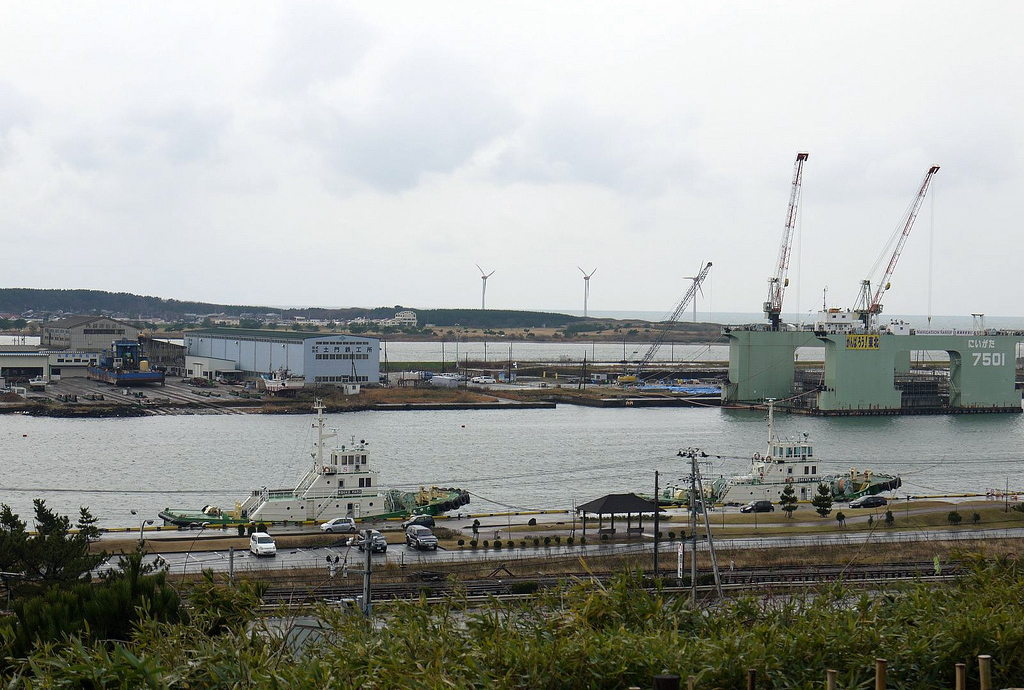
- Interactive map of Port of Sakata

Location
- Country: Japan
- Location: Sakata
- Coordinates: 38°55′52″N 139°49′08″E

Details
- Operated by: Yamagata Prefecture
- Type of Harbor: Seaport
- Land area: 662.5 hectares

Statistics
- Annual cargo tonnage: 3,152,342t
- Annual container volume: 5,486 TEU

The Port of Sakata (酒田港, Sakata-kō) is a seaport on the Sea of Japan coast of Yamagata Prefecture, to the west of the city center of Sakata at the mouth of the Mogami River in the Tōhoku region of northern Honshū, Japan. It is classified as a Major Port (重要港湾, Jūyō-kōwan) and as a Special Port (特定港, Tokutei-kō) by the Japanese government.

== History ==
The Port of Sakata is located at the mouth of the Mogami River and has existed since the Kamakura period. Sakata City was developed during the Edo period, as one of the most important ports of call on the Kitamaebune trading routes of coastal from Osaka to Hokkaido, rivaling Sakai in revenue. This region thrived off of its safflower and rice trade and developed a thriving relationship with Kyoto City. This trade also brought about the development of a thriving entertainment district in the downtown area. This included many high-class restaurants and even a maiko teahouse called Somaro.

Much of the trade was under the control of the local Homma clan, which became the largest landowners in Japan during Meiji period. During the Meiji period, the port facilities were gradually improved and enlarged, with international shipping routes established by Nippon Yusen in 1885, and a lighthouse established in 1895. The port received the designation of “major port” from the Japanese government on January 19, 1951. In 1957, Sakata was designated a port for the import of timber. The first timber ship from the Soviet Union called on the port in 1958. A 10,000 ton quay was completed in 1962. In 1966, development began on Sakata North Port, which opened in 1974. A thermal power plant was completed in 1977, with the part of the power for an aluminum mill by Sumitomo Light Metals nearby. The aluminum mill closed in 1982. In 2004, Japan's first offshore wind power plant started operation off of the Sakata North Port.

From 2017, The Port of Sakata has begun to welcome international cruise ships into its port. This included the Neo Costa Romantica in 2017 and two visits by the Diamond Princess in 2018. This port has welcomed the MSC Splendida vessel on September 16, 2019, and will host return visits by the Diamond Princess in the future. On April 8th 2024 it hosted the Holland America Line vessel Westerdam.

== Access ==
The Port of Sakata is located approximately 10 to 20 minutes by car from the city center of Sakata City. While there are no public transportation options to and from the port, taxis and privately arranged bus services are available for when cruise ships visit the port area.

The port itself is located in the industrial sector of Sakata City, walking through this area is not recommended due to this.
