= Tobishima, Yamagata =

Island in Yamagata Prefecture, Japan

Tobishima
Native name: Japanese: 飛島
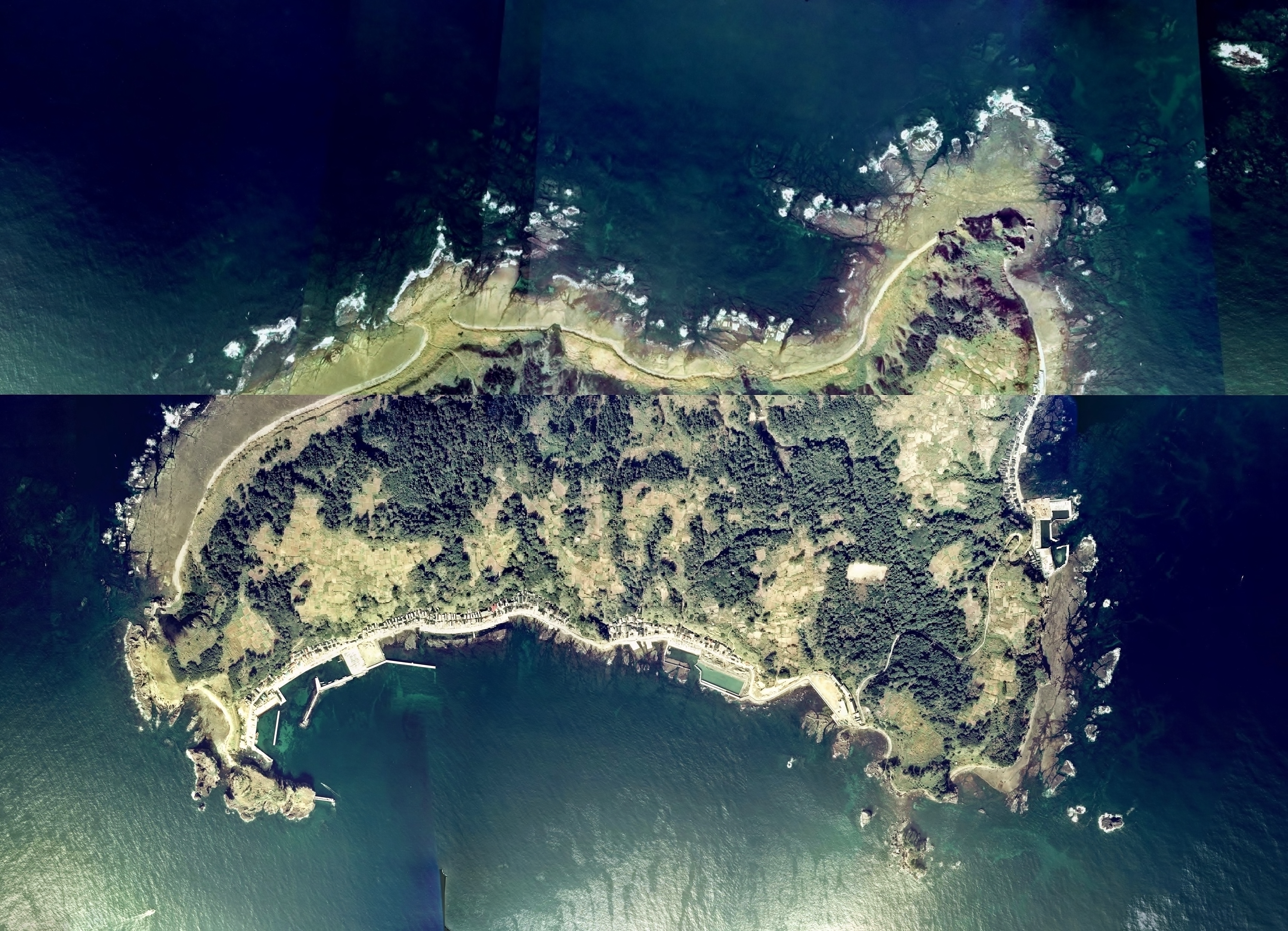
- Aerial photograph of Tobishima in 1976

- Location within Japan

Geography
- Location: Sea of Japan
- Coordinates: 39°11′40″N 139°32′56″E
- Area: 2.75 km^{2} (1.06 sq mi)
- Length: 2 km (1.2 mi)
- Width: 1 km (0.6 mi)
- Coastline: 10.2 km (6.34 mi)
- Highest elevation: 68 m (223 ft)
- Highest point: Takamoriyama

Administration
- Japan
- Prefecture: Yamagata
- City: Sakata

Demographics
- Population: 158 (2020)
- Pop. density: 57/km^{2} (148/sq mi)
- Ethnic groups: Japanese

Tobishima (飛島), is an inhabited island located in the Sea of Japan, administered as part of Sakata, Yamagata Prefecture, Japan. The island, 2.75 km² in area, had 158 inhabitants as of 2020. The island has no airport, and access is normally by ferry to the city of Sakata on the mainland. The islanders are dependent mainly on commercial fishing and seasonal tourism.

== Geography ==
Tobishima is approximately 3 kilometres (1.9 mi) by 1 kilometre (0.62 mi). It is located 39 kilometres (21 nmi) west of Honshu. The highest point is Takamori-yama ( 高森山 ) at 68 metres (223 ft). The island is mostly flat, with a gentle rise from the east coast to the west coast, the west coast is characterized by steep cliffs. The port facilities are therefore located on the east coast and along with most of the population. Due to the effects of the warm Tsushima current, the island has relatively mild weather year-round average annual temperatures of 12 °C; even snowfall of 10 cm is rare. The island is covered with evergreen deciduous trees, including Eurya japonica.

=== Important Bird Area ===
Tobishima serves as an important site for some 270 species of migratory birds. It, with neighbouring, and much smaller, Oshakujima, have been recognised as an Important Bird Area (IBA) by BirdLife International for their colonies of black-tailed gulls.

=== Climate ===
Climate data for Tobishima, elevation 58 m (190 ft), (1991−2020 normals, extremes 1978−present)
Month	Jan	Feb	Mar	Apr	May	Jun	Jul	Aug	Sep	Oct	Nov	Dec	Year
Record high °C (°F)	13.4 (56.1)	16.1 (61.0)	18.0 (64.4)	24.9 (76.8)	28.1 (82.6)	32.0 (89.6)	34.0 (93.2)	35.1 (95.2)	33.1 (91.6)	27.3 (81.1)	21.6 (70.9)	18.5 (65.3)	35.1 (95.2)
Mean daily maximum °C (°F)	4.7 (40.5)	5.3 (41.5)	8.6 (47.5)	13.6 (56.5)	18.5 (65.3)	22.7 (72.9)	26.1 (79.0)	28.4 (83.1)	24.8 (76.6)	19.2 (66.6)	13.3 (55.9)	7.6 (45.7)	16.1 (60.9)
Daily mean °C (°F)	2.1 (35.8)	2.3 (36.1)	4.9 (40.8)	9.4 (48.9)	14.1 (57.4)	18.4 (65.1)	22.4 (72.3)	24.4 (75.9)	21.0 (69.8)	15.6 (60.1)	10.0 (50.0)	4.8 (40.6)	12.5 (54.4)
Mean daily minimum °C (°F)	−0.1 (31.8)	−0.2 (31.6)	1.9 (35.4)	6.1 (43.0)	10.8 (51.4)	15.3 (59.5)	19.8 (67.6)	21.5 (70.7)	18.1 (64.6)	12.7 (54.9)	7.2 (45.0)	2.3 (36.1)	9.6 (49.3)
Record low °C (°F)	−8.3 (17.1)	−7.5 (18.5)	−3.9 (25.0)	−0.6 (30.9)	3.7 (38.7)	8.1 (46.6)	12.4 (54.3)	14.7 (58.5)	9.7 (49.5)	4.7 (40.5)	−1.9 (28.6)	−6.7 (19.9)	−8.3 (17.1)
Average precipitation mm (inches)	111.0 (4.37)	79.6 (3.13)	84.2 (3.31)	84.1 (3.31)	86.4 (3.40)	91.4 (3.60)	157.1 (6.19)	161.1 (6.34)	144.1 (5.67)	148.3 (5.84)	152.6 (6.01)	148.8 (5.86)	1,428.7 (56.25)
Average precipitation days (≥ 1.0 mm)	20.0	15.8	14.7	11.3	10.0	8.5	11.5	9.6	12.2	14.6	18.6	22.0	168.8
Mean monthly sunshine hours	62.2	92.0	167.1	225.3	240.2	224.2	199.8	234.7	194.2	171.1	112.4	62.5	1,988.4
Source: Japan Meteorological Agency

== History ==
Tobishima has been populated for several thousand years, with archaeological finds from the early Jōmon period dated to 6000–7000 years ago. In the late Heian period, the island was controlled by the Abe clan, followed by the Kiyohara clan. In the Edo period, it was part of the holdings of the Sakai clan at Shonai Domain and an occasional port for the kitamaebune coastal trading vessels.

As of April 1950, the village of Tobishima and thus the island was annexed by the city of Sakata, Yamagata.
