= Teiji Honma =

Japanese ice hockey player

- Teiji Honma used a distinctive mask in his appearance at the 1936 Winter Olympics.
- Born: April 14, 1911 Sakata, Yamagata Prefecture, Empire of Japan
- Position: Goaltender
- Caught: Left
- National team: Japan
- Playing career: 1936–1936

Teiji Honma (本間 悌次, Honma Teiji; born April 14, 1911) was an ice hockey goaltender who represented Japan at the 1936 Winter Olympics, held in Garmisch-Partenkirchen, Bavaria, Germany.

== Biography ==
Honma was 25 years old when he represented Japan as a member of the Manchurian Medical University ice hockey team. Honma was born in Sakata, Yamagata Prefecture, Japan. He attended medical school in Manchuria, which had been occupied by Japan since 1931, at Manchurian Medical Science University in Mukhden.

During the Olympics, Honma was one of the first goaltenders to wear a goaltender mask. In 1927, Elizabeth Graham, playing for the Queen's University women's ice hockey team, used a fencing mask at the insistence of her father. Three years later, Clint Benedict, playing for the Montreal Maroons of the National Hockey League, used a leather mask to protect his broken nose. He quickly discarded it, as the nosepiece obstructed his vision. In contrast, Jacques Plante invented and started regularly using the first practical goaltender mask in 1959. The last North American professional goaltender not to regularly wear a mask was Andy Brown, who played his last game maskless in 1974 (he retired in 1977).

His mask was similar to what a baseball catcher wore. It was made of leather and had a wire cage to protect the face. Honma wore glasses when in nets, and the wire cage had two circular eyeholes designed to fit over the glasses and to be narrower than the puck. Honma played both of Japan's two games. He lost his first game 3–0 against Great Britain, who would go on to win the gold medal. He lost his second game against Sweden 2–0. Both of the games were played outdoors, and snowstorms caused interruptions in the game.
