= 1894 Shōnai earthquake =

Earthquake 1894 in Sakata, Japan

- 庄内地震
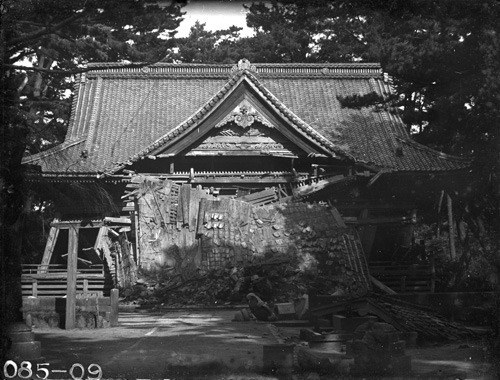

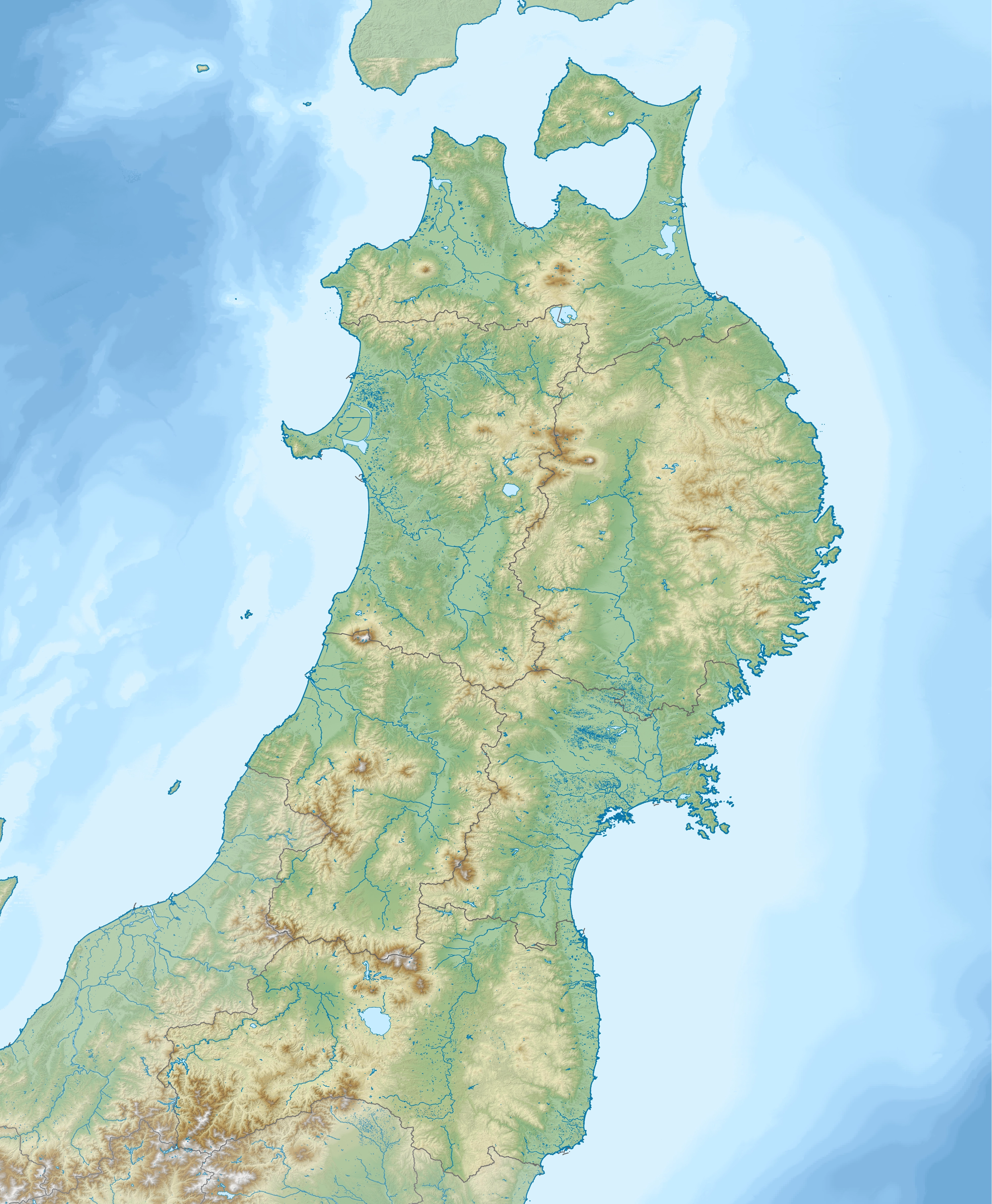
- Location within Tohoku, Japan Location within Yamagata Prefecture
- Local date: October 22, 1894
- Magnitude: 7.0 M_{L}
- Epicenter: 38.9°N 139.9°E
- Casualties: 726 (Death toll)

The 1894 Shōnai earthquake (Japanese: 庄内地震) is an earthquake occurred on October 22, 1894 at Sakata, Yamagata Prefecture in Japan. It was caused by the movement of the Shonai Plain Eastern Margin Fault Zone (庄内平野東縁断層帯).

== Damage ==
According to the official confirmed report, 14,118 houses and buildings were damaged and 2,148 were burned. There were 726 fatalities and 8,403 injuries in the damaged area. A large-scale fire broke out in Sakata, and around the Shonai plain area, many instances of cracked earth, sinking ground, sand boils, and fountains were observed.
