= Sakata Kyodo Thermal Power Station =

Power station in Sakata, Yamagata prefecture, Japan

Sakata Kyodo Thermal Power Station 酒田共同火力発電所
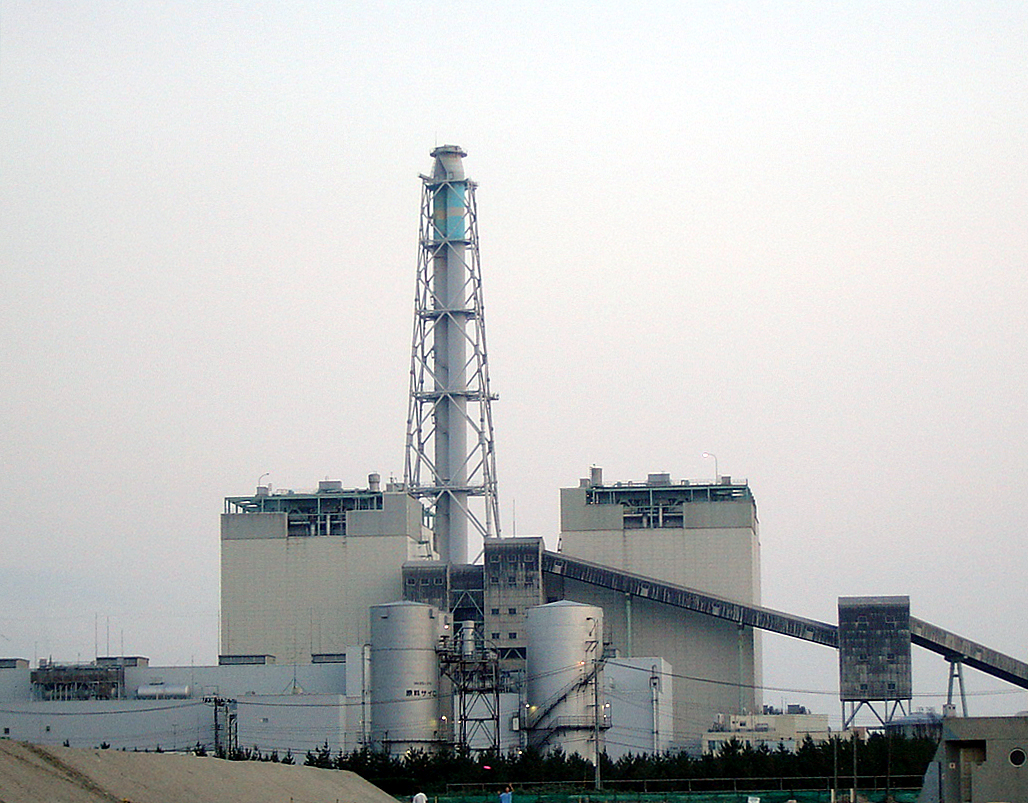
- Sakata Joint Thermal Power Station
- Country: Japan Yamagata Prefecture#Japan
- Location: Sakata, Yamagata, Japan
- Coordinates: 38°58′10″N 139°49′59″E
- Status: Operational
- Commission date: 1977
- Owners: Sakata Kyodo Power Co., Ltd
- Operator: Sakata Kyodo Power

Thermal power station
- Primary fuel: Coal
- Secondary fuel: Biomass

Power generation
- Units operational: 2
- Nameplate capacity: 700 MW

External links
- Commons: Related media on Commons

The Sakata Kyodo Thermal Power Station (酒田共同火力発電所, Sakai Kyodo Karyoku Hatsudensho) is a coal-fired thermal power station operated by the Sakai Joint Power Co., Ltd in the city of Sakata, Yamagata, Japan. The facility is located on the Sea of Japan coast of Honshu. The Sakata Joint Power Co., Ltd is a joint venture between Tohoku Electric and Sumitomo Light Aluminum Company,

== History ==
Unit 1 of the Sakata Kyodo Thermal Power Station started operation in October 1977, followed by Unit 2 in October 1978. Initially, both units were designed to burn heavy oil; however, Unit 1 was converted to coal in 1984 and Unit 2 was converted to coal in October 1978 and a mixture of coal and biomass (wood pellets) in May 2011, with heavy oil and light oil also usable as auxiliary fuel.

Coal ash from the plant is recycled into raw materials for cement and into fertilizers.

== Plant details ==
Unit	Fuel	Type	Capacity	On line	Status
1	Coal	Steam turbine	350 MW	October 1977	operational
2	Coal / Biomass	Steam turbine	350 MW	October 1978	operational

== See also ==
- Energy in Japan
- List of power stations in Japan
