= Haguro, Yamagata =

Dissolved municipality in Yamagata prefecture, Japan

Coordinates: 35°21′N 136°57′E

Haguro (羽黒町, Haguro-machi) was a town located in Higashitagawa District, Yamagata Prefecture, Japan.

As of 2003, the town had an estimated population of 9,499 and a density of 86.66 persons per km^{2}. The total area was 109.61 km^{2}.

On October 1, 2005, Haguro, along with the towns of Fujishima and Kushibiki, the village of Asahi (all from Higashitagawa District), and the town of Atsumi (from Nishitagawa District), was merged into the expanded city of Tsuruoka, and no longer exists as an independent municipality.
