= Tsuruoka National College of Technology =

Japanese college

Coordinates: 38°42′35.4″N 139°47′50.9″E

- 鶴岡工業高等専門学校
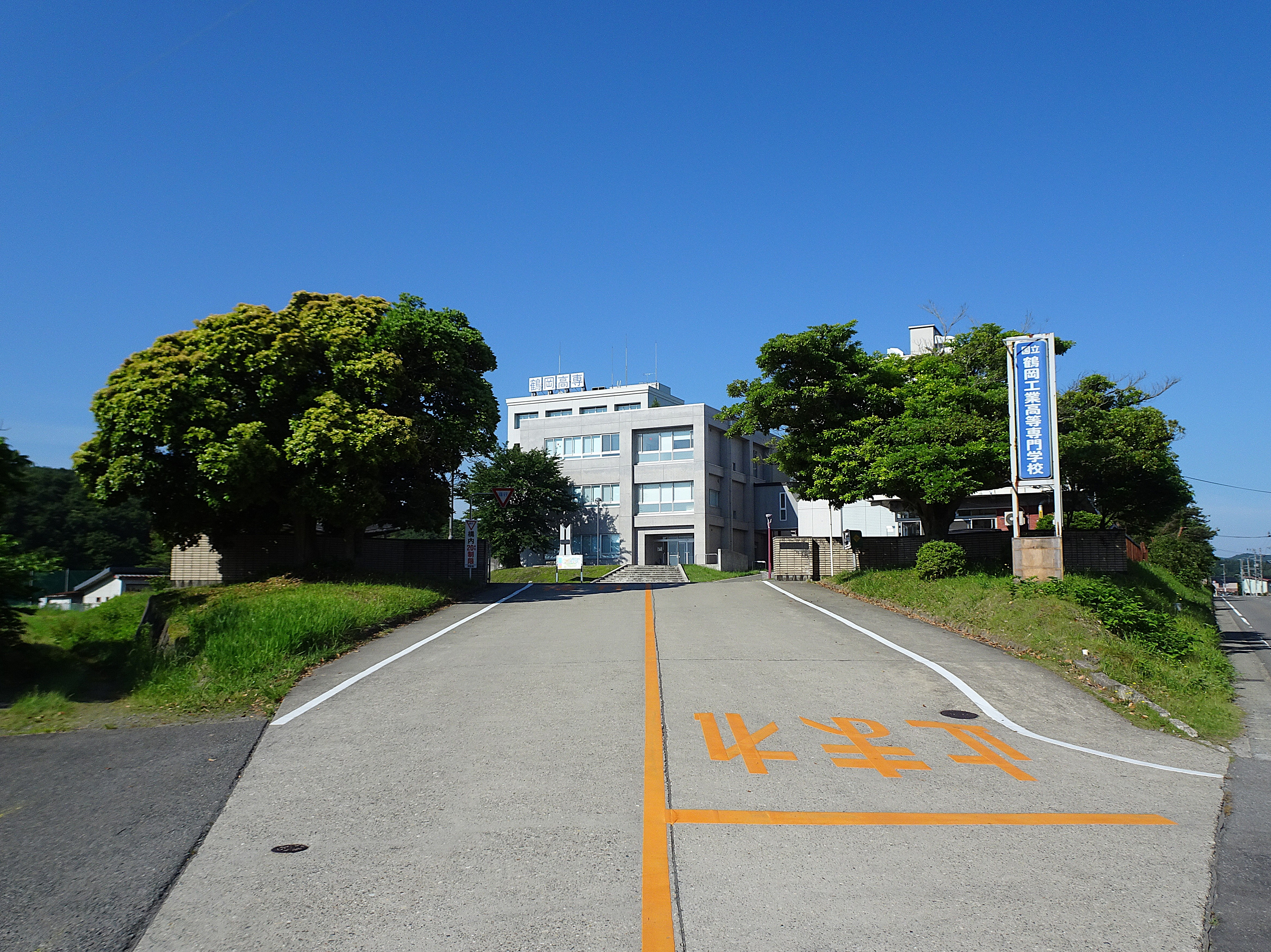
- Type: public
- Established: 1997 (junior college), 2000 (university)
- President: Masaaki Yokoyama
- Administrative staff: 82 (2007)
- Undergraduates: 832 (2008)
- Postgraduates: 44 (2008)
- Location: Tsuruoka, Yamagata, Japan

Tsuruoka National College of Technology (鶴岡工業高等専門学校, Tsuruoka Kougyou Koutousenmongakkou) is a Japanese National College of Technology that is located in Tsuruoka, Yamagata. The abbreviated name is TNCT (Japanese: 鶴岡高専; Tsuruoka Kousen)。

== History ==
- 1963 Tsuruoka National College of Technology was founded on April 1, 1963 (the two-class Department of Mechanical Engineering class and Department of Electronic Engineering).
- 1967 Department of Industrial Chemistry established.
- 1990 Department of Control and Information Systems Engineering came into being by reorganizing the two-class Department of Mechanical Engineering.
- 1993 Department of Industrial Chemistry was reorganized into Department of Material Engineering.
- 2003 Advanced Engineering Course was established.
- 2004 After the "Institution of National Colleges of Technology Japan" Act was enacted, this college has become the Tsuruoka College of Technology of the Institute of National Colleges of Technology Japan.
- 2005 Department of Electrical Engineering was renamed Department of Electrical and Electronics Engineering.

== Departments ==
=== Regular Course (Associate's degree Course) ===
Five years' course.

- Department of Mechanical Engineering
- Department of Electrical and Electronics Engineering
- Department of Control and Information Systems Engineering
- Department of Material Engineering

=== Advanced Engineering Course (Bachelor's Degree Course) ===
Two years' course. Graduated regular course student can enter this course after entrance examination acceptance.

- Department of Mechanical and Electrical Engineering
- Department of Chemical and Biological Engineering

== See also ==
- Colleges of technology in Japan

== Presidents ==
1. Mosuke Hayashi (1963–1971)
2. Shingi Saito (1971–1976)
3. Shozo Watarai (1976–1981)
4. Mayumi Someno (1981–1986)
5. Jiro Shimizu (1986–1993)
6. Mitsuo Abe (1993–2001)
7. Tsutomu Nonaka (2001–2006)
8. Masaaki Yokoyama (2006–2011)
9. Yasushi Kato (2011–2016)
10. Koji Takahashi (2016–present)
