= Yamagata Prefectural Sakata Higashi High School =

School in Sakata, Yamagata, Japan

Coordinates: 38.9096°N 139.8417°E

Yamagata Prefectural Sakata Higashi High School (山形県立酒田東高等学校) is a high school in Sakata, Yamagata, Japan. It was established in 1920, and is located close to the center of Sakata on the site of a former Edo period fortification called Kamegaseki. There are approximately 600 students enrolled in the school.

== Notable alumni ==
- Makiko Mori, novelist
