= Asahi, Yamagata (Higashitagawa) =

Dissolved municipality in Yamagata prefecture, Japan

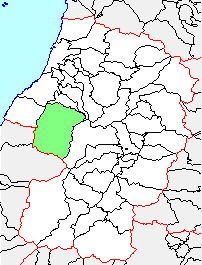

Asahi (朝日村, Asahi-mura) was a village located in Higashitagawa District, Yamagata Prefecture, Japan. The village was not related to the town of Asahi in the same prefecture or the adjacent Asahi in Niigata Prefecture.

On October 1, 2005, Asahi, along with the towns of Fujishima, Haguro and Kushibiki (all from Higashitagawa District), and the town of Atsumi (from Nishitagawa District), was merged into the expanded city of Tsuruoka, and no longer exists as an independent municipality.

Asahi literally means "morning sun". The village is named after Asahi Mountains, which shine bright in the morning light.

The village was established in 1954 by the merger of the villages of Oizumi, Hongo and Azuma.
