= Tsuruoka =

Tsuruoka 鶴岡市
- City
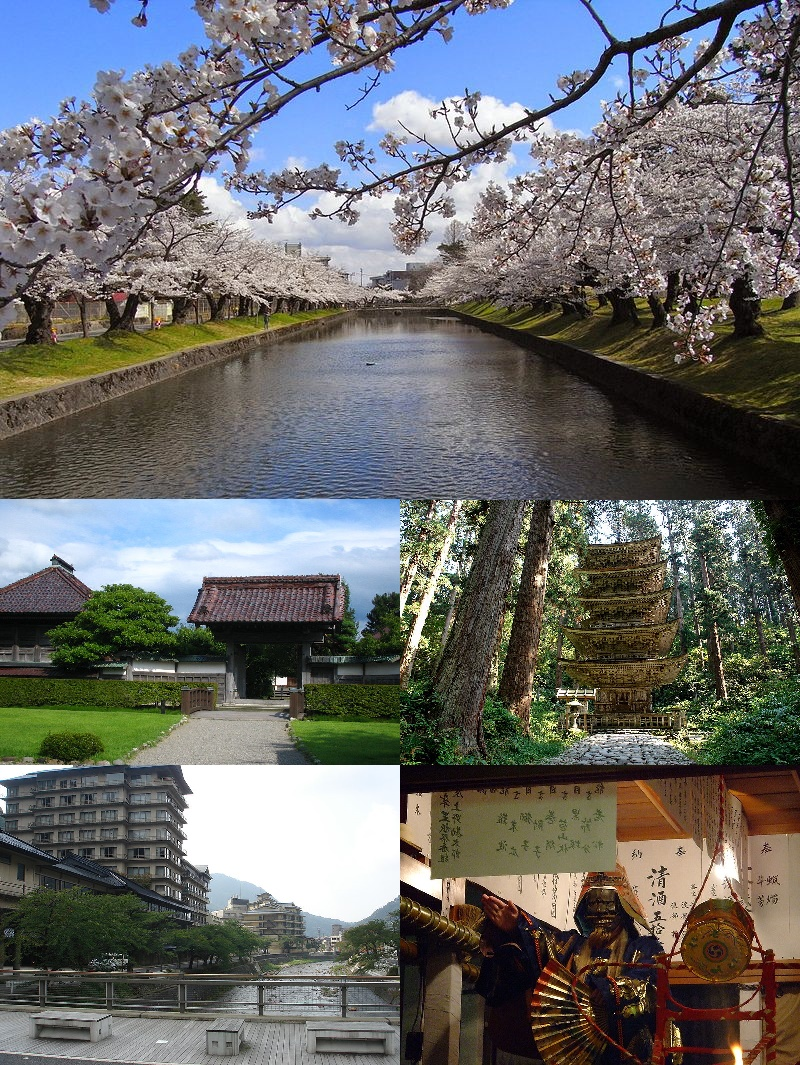
- Top:Cherry blossom in Tsuruoka Park, Middle left:Chido hall of Tsuruoka, Middle right:Five story pagoda in Mount Haguro, Bottom left:Atsumi Spa, Bottom right:Ogisai Kurokawa Noh

- Flag Seal

- Location of Tsuruoka in Yamagata Prefecture

- Coordinates: 38°43′38″N 139°49′36″E
- Country: Japan
- Region: Tōhoku
- Prefecture: Yamagata
- First official recorded: 593 AD
- City Settled: October 1, 1924

Government
  - Mayor: Satoshi Satō (佐藤聡) - from October 2025

Area
  - Total: 1,311.53 km^{2} (506.38 sq mi)

Population (February 2020)
  - Total: 125,389
  - Density: 95.6051/km^{2} (247.616/sq mi)
- Time zone: UTC+9 (Japan Standard Time)
- Phone number: 0235-25-2111
- Address: 9-25, Babachō, Tsuruoka-shi, Yamagata-ken 997-8601
- Climate: Cfa
- Website: Official website
- Symbols
- Flower: Sakura
- Tree: Japanese beech

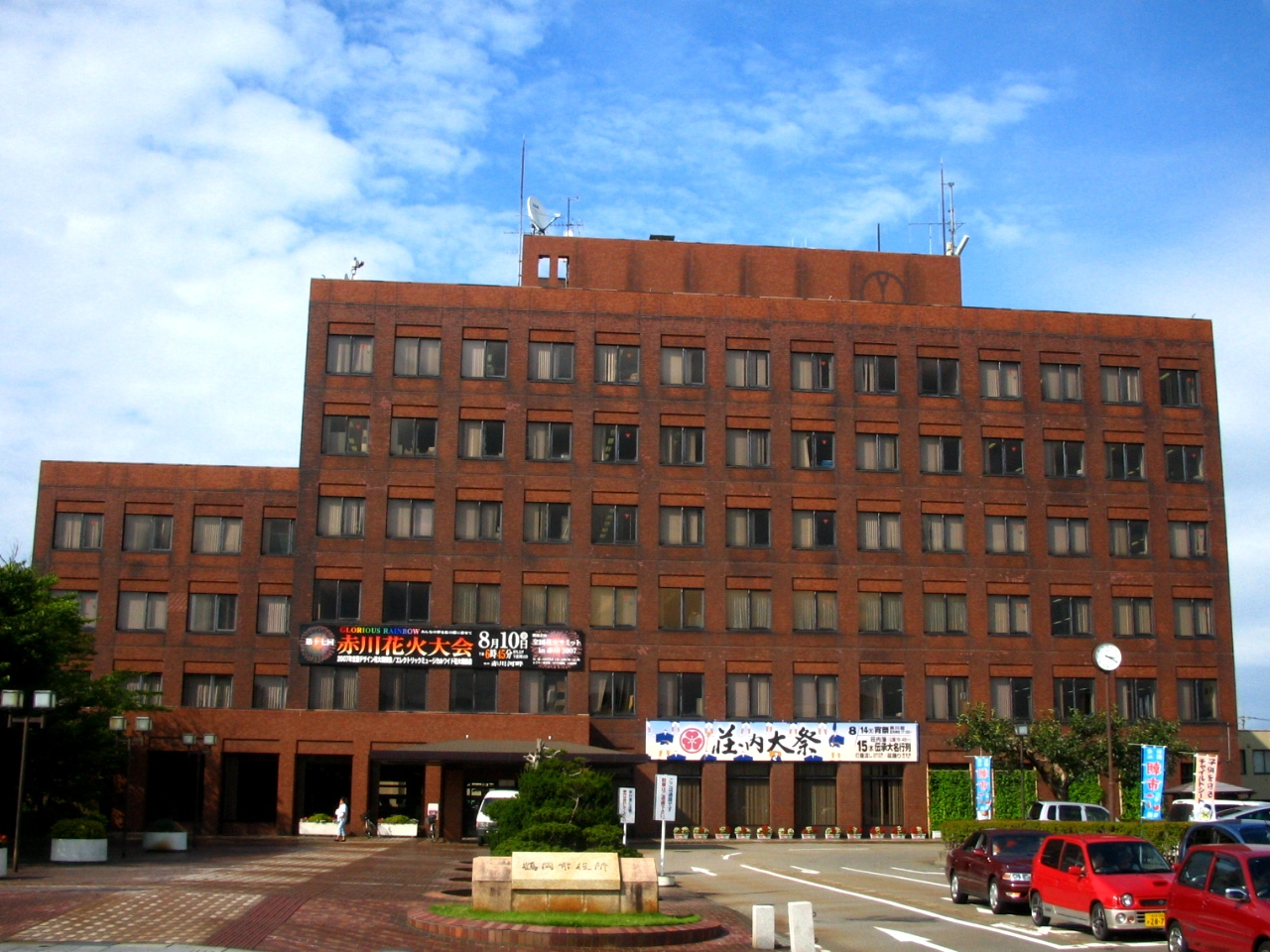
View of Tsuruoka City Office

Tsuruoka (鶴岡市, Tsuruoka-shi) is a city in Yamagata Prefecture, Japan. As of 31 January 2020, the city had an estimated population of 125,389 in 49,024 households, and a population density of 95.74 persons per km^{2}. The total area of the city is 1,311.53 square kilometres (506.38 square miles). Tsuruoka is the biggest city in Tōhoku region in terms of land area.

Today's Tsuruoka is the result of the fusion of several neighborhoods around the center of the city such as Atsumi, Asahi, Fujishima, Kushibiki, and Haguro in 1953.

== Geography ==
Tsuruoka is located on the coast of Yamagata Prefecture bordering the Sea of Japan and has some locally popular beaches such as Yunohama and Sanze. All three of the Three Mountains of Dewa are at least partially within the city limits.

Two main rivers run through Tsuruoka, the Akagawa River (赤川, literally "Red River"), and the Mogami River.

=== Neighboring municipalities ===
- Niigata Prefecture
  - Murakami
- Yamagata Prefecture
  - Mikawa
  - Nishikawa
  - Sakata
  - Shōnai

=== Climate ===
Tsuruoka has a humid subtropical climate (Köppen Cfa) with large seasonal temperature differences, featuring warm to hot (and often humid) summers and cold (sometimes severely cold) winters. Precipitation is significant throughout the year but is heaviest from July to January. The average annual temperature in Tsuruoka is 12.9 °C (55.2 °F). The average annual precipitation is 2,191.4 mm (86.28 in) with December as the wettest month. Temperatures are highest on average in August, at around 25.3 °C (77.5 °F), and lowest in January, at around 1.7 °C (35.1 °F). The region is known for its heavy snowfalls during the winter, and people living in Sekigawa and Atsumi's neighborhoods can expect up to 2 meters of snow which after removal creates very particular snow walls standing high along the road. The first snows usually come in late November but the real peak is generally around January. The red leaves appear generally at the end of October and end in mid-November.

Climate data for Tsuruoka, elevation 16 m (52 ft), (1991–2020 normals, extremes 1976–present)
Month	Jan	Feb	Mar	Apr	May	Jun	Jul	Aug	Sep	Oct	Nov	Dec	Year
Record high °C (°F)	15.2 (59.4)	21.4 (70.5)	26.1 (79.0)	30.4 (86.7)	32.3 (90.1)	33.8 (92.8)	37.8 (100.0)	39.9 (103.8)	38.2 (100.8)	31.7 (89.1)	26.3 (79.3)	19.5 (67.1)	39.9 (103.8)
Mean daily maximum °C (°F)	4.4 (39.9)	5.1 (41.2)	9.1 (48.4)	15.7 (60.3)	21.2 (70.2)	24.8 (76.6)	28.2 (82.8)	29.9 (85.8)	26.0 (78.8)	20.0 (68.0)	13.7 (56.7)	7.5 (45.5)	17.1 (62.9)
Daily mean °C (°F)	1.7 (35.1)	1.9 (35.4)	4.9 (40.8)	10.4 (50.7)	16.0 (60.8)	20.1 (68.2)	23.9 (75.0)	25.3 (77.5)	21.3 (70.3)	15.3 (59.5)	9.5 (49.1)	4.2 (39.6)	12.9 (55.2)
Mean daily minimum °C (°F)	−0.9 (30.4)	−1.1 (30.0)	1.0 (33.8)	5.3 (41.5)	11.1 (52.0)	16.0 (60.8)	20.3 (68.5)	21.4 (70.5)	17.3 (63.1)	11.0 (51.8)	5.3 (41.5)	1.2 (34.2)	9.0 (48.2)
Record low °C (°F)	−9.6 (14.7)	−11.6 (11.1)	−11.0 (12.2)	−4.3 (24.3)	2.2 (36.0)	6.9 (44.4)	11.5 (52.7)	13.7 (56.7)	7.2 (45.0)	1.5 (34.7)	−3.3 (26.1)	−11.3 (11.7)	−11.6 (11.1)
Average precipitation mm (inches)	218.3 (8.59)	134.8 (5.31)	130.0 (5.12)	106.8 (4.20)	119.9 (4.72)	124.3 (4.89)	220.2 (8.67)	198.9 (7.83)	184.6 (7.27)	207.7 (8.18)	267.0 (10.51)	278.7 (10.97)	2,191.4 (86.28)
Average precipitation days (≥ 1.0 mm)	25.4	20.8	18.8	13.5	11.9	11.2	13.8	12.2	13.9	15.8	20.2	24.9	202.4
Mean monthly sunshine hours	24.6	44.7	109.2	171.1	199.3	177.1	155.0	198.5	150.8	121.5	77.7	35.8	1,465.3
Source: Japan Meteorological Agency

Climate data for Nezugaseki Pass, Tsuruoka, elevation 18 m (59 ft), (1991–2020 normals, extremes 1976–present)
Month	Jan	Feb	Mar	Apr	May	Jun	Jul	Aug	Sep	Oct	Nov	Dec	Year
Record high °C (°F)	15.3 (59.5)	20.4 (68.7)	25.3 (77.5)	28.8 (83.8)	29.0 (84.2)	33.1 (91.6)	37.6 (99.7)	40.4 (104.7)	39.1 (102.4)	30.6 (87.1)	27.0 (80.6)	20.7 (69.3)	40.4 (104.7)
Mean daily maximum °C (°F)	5.1 (41.2)	5.5 (41.9)	8.8 (47.8)	14.5 (58.1)	19.7 (67.5)	23.2 (73.8)	26.9 (80.4)	28.9 (84.0)	25.3 (77.5)	19.6 (67.3)	13.9 (57.0)	8.4 (47.1)	16.7 (62.0)
Daily mean °C (°F)	2.5 (36.5)	2.5 (36.5)	5.1 (41.2)	10.0 (50.0)	15.2 (59.4)	19.2 (66.6)	23.3 (73.9)	24.9 (76.8)	21.1 (70.0)	15.5 (59.9)	10.1 (50.2)	5.2 (41.4)	12.9 (55.2)
Mean daily minimum °C (°F)	−0.1 (31.8)	−0.3 (31.5)	1.5 (34.7)	5.6 (42.1)	10.9 (51.6)	15.6 (60.1)	20.3 (68.5)	21.6 (70.9)	17.6 (63.7)	11.8 (53.2)	6.5 (43.7)	2.2 (36.0)	9.4 (49.0)
Record low °C (°F)	−6.3 (20.7)	−7.5 (18.5)	−6.7 (19.9)	−3.7 (25.3)	1.8 (35.2)	7.0 (44.6)	10.7 (51.3)	12.9 (55.2)	7.2 (45.0)	2.8 (37.0)	−1.3 (29.7)	−6.3 (20.7)	−7.5 (18.5)
Average precipitation mm (inches)	171.0 (6.73)	107.5 (4.23)	118.4 (4.66)	115.0 (4.53)	130.4 (5.13)	137.7 (5.42)	225.4 (8.87)	201.3 (7.93)	187.6 (7.39)	198.6 (7.82)	227.7 (8.96)	217.3 (8.56)	2,037.9 (80.23)
Average precipitation days (≥ 1.0 mm)	24.3	19.0	17.2	13.0	11.9	10.7	13.7	11.1	13.5	15.5	19.2	23.1	192.2
Mean monthly sunshine hours	31.3	52.3	108.7	161.8	194.4	182.0	157.5	194.5	147.6	126.3	79.1	37.6	1,473.2
Source: Japan Meteorological Agency

== Demographics ==
Per Japanese census data, the population of Tsuruoka has declined in recent decades.

Historical population
Year	Pop.	±%
1920	126,228	—
1930	136,332	+8.0%
1940	142,150	+4.3%
1950	172,467	+21.3%
1960	167,810	−2.7%
1970	153,173	−8.7%
1980	153,330	+0.1%
1990	150,840	−1.6%
2000	147,546	−2.2%
2010	136,623	−7.4%
2020	125,347	−8.3%

== History ==
The area of present-day Tsuruoka was part of ancient Dewa Province. In the Edo period, it served as the capital of the Shōnai Domain. It was a minor port for the kitamaebune coastal trade.

After the start of the Meiji period, the area organized as Tsuruoka Town under Nishitagawa District, Yamagata Prefecture in 1878. It was elevated to city status on October 1, 1924, becoming Japan's 100th city. In 1955, the city expanded by annexing the town of Kamo and nine neighboring villages. The town of Oyama was annexed by Tsuruoka in 1963.

On October 1, 2005, the towns of Fujishima, Haguro and Kushibiki, and the village of Asahi (all from Higashitagawa District), and the town of Atsumi (from Nishitagawa District) were merged into Tsuruoka.

== Government ==
Tsuruoka has a mayor-council form of government with a directly elected mayor and a unicameral city legislature of 24 members. The city contributes five members to the Yamagata Prefectural Assembly. In terms of national politics, the city is part of Yamagata District 3 of the lower house of the Diet of Japan.

== Economy ==
Tsuruoka has a mixed economy based on light manufacturing, commercial services, agriculture, and commercial fishing.

== Education ==
Tsuruoka has 26 public elementary schools and 11 public middle schools operated by the city government and six public high schools operated by the Yamagata Prefectural Board of Education. There are also two private high schools. The prefecture also operates two special education schools for the handicapped.

=== Colleges and universities ===
- Keio University, Institute for Advanced Biosciences (Tsuruoka Town Campus and Metabolome Campus)
- Tohoku University of Community Service and Science (Tsuruoka Campus)
- Tsuruoka National College of Technology
- Yamagata University, Faculty of Agriculture

=== High schools ===
- Tsuruoka Minami High School
- Tsuruoka Kita High School
- Tsuruoka Kamo Fisheries High School
- Tsuruoka Higashi High School
- Tsuruoka Kogyo High School
- Tsuruoka Chuo High School
- Yamazoe High School
- Shonai Agricultural High School
- Haguro High School

=== Junior high schools ===
- Tsuruoka Daiichi Junior High School
- Tsuruoka Daini Junior High School
- Tsuruoka Daisan Junior High School
- Tsuruoka Daiyon Junior High School
- Tsuruoka Daigo Junior High School
- Tsuruoka Toyoura Junior High School
- Tsuruoka Fujishima Junior High School
- Tsuruoka Haguro Junior High School
- Tsuruoka Kushibiki Junior High School
- Tsuruoka Asahi Junior High School
- Tsuruoka Atsumi Junior High School

=== Elementary schools ===
- Tsuruoka Choyo Daiichi Elementary School
- Tsuruoka Choyo Daini Elementary School
- Tsuruoka Choyo Daisan Elementary School
- Tsuruoka Choyo Daiyon Elementary School
- Tsuruoka Choyo Daigo Elementary School
- Tsuruoka Choyo Dairoku Elementary School
- Tsuruoka Itsuki Elementary School
- Tsuruoka Kogane Elementary School
- Tsuruoka Oizumi Elementary School
- Tsuruoka Yutagawa Elementary School
- Tsuruoka Kyoden Elementary School
- Tsuruoka Tagawa Elementary School
- Tsuruoka Sanze Elementary School
- Tsuruoka Kogata Elementary School
- Tsuruoka Yura Elementary School
- Tsuruoka Kamo Elementary School
- Tsuruoka Yunohama Elementary School
- Tsuruoka Oyama Elementary School
- Tsuruoka Nishigo Elementary School
- Tsuruoka Kamigo Elementary School
- Tsuruoka Fujishima Elementary School
- Tsuruoka Toei Elementary School
- Tsuruoka Watamae Elementary School
- Tsuruoka Haguro Elementary School
- Tsuruoka Hirose Elementary School
- Tsuruoka Kushibiki Higashi Elementary School
- Tsuruoka Kushibiki Nishi Elementary School
- Tsuruoka Kushibiki Minami Elementary School
- Tsuruoka Otsuna Elementary School
- Tsuruoka Asahi Elementary School
- Tsuruoka Atsumi Elementary School
- Tsuruoka Iragawa Elementary School
- Tsuruoka Nezugaseki Elementary School
- Tsuruoka Fukuei Elementary School
- Tsuruoka Yamato Elementary School

== Health care ==
- Tsuruoka Shonai Hospital
- Tsuruoka Kyoritsu Hospital
- Yutagawa Onsen Rehabilitation Medical Center

== Transportation ==
=== Airports ===
- Shonai Airport

=== Railway ===
East Japan Railway Company - Uetsu Main Line

- Nezugaseki - Koiwagawa - Atsumi Onsen - Iragawa - Kobato - Sanze - Uzen-Mizusawa - Uzen-Ōyama - Tsuruoka - Fujishima

=== Highway ===
- Yamagata Expressway: Yudonosan, Shōnai Asahi, Tsuruoka interchanges
- Nihonkai-Tōhoku Expressway
- National Route 7
- National Route 112
- National Route 345

== Media ==
=== TV ===
- NHK Tsuruoka Broadcast Station

=== Newspapers ===
- Shonai Nippo

== Culture ==
=== The mountain spirit ===
Tsuruoka is mostly known for its "Three Mountains of Dewa", which refers to Mt. Haguro, the smallest mount that culminates at only 436m high; Mt. Gassan, the highest mount at 1984m; and Mt. Yudono, at 1500m.

==== Yamabushi and Shugendô ====
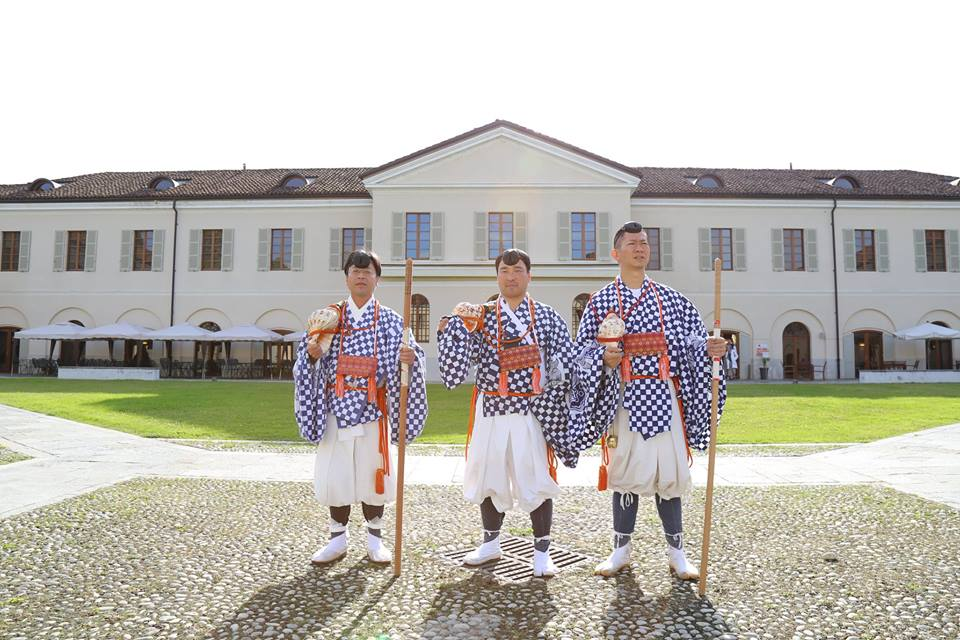
Tsuruoka's Yamabushi outfit

Those three mounts are considered the core of the Shugendô practice. Shugendô (修験道, lit. The way of the ascetic practice) is often perceived as a form of syncretism of Shintô and Buddhism. The Yamabushi (山伏, lit. "the men who sleep in the Mountain"), or men who practice shugendô, believe in Buddha but also believe that a god resides in all things that exist in nature. Yamabushi wear checkered vests and blow trumpet shells to communicate with their peers and to keep the bad spirits away. They aim to protect the mountain and to live a sinless life connected to nature.

The pilgrimage of all three mountains is done in that way The three mountains symbolically represent death and rebirth. By going down and up the 2446 stone stairs of Mt. Haguro, visitors can experience a symbolic "death" and "rebirth," after which they can gain access to the world of the dead represented by Mt. Gassan and its foggy landscapes. Lastly, they can purify their body and soul in Mt. Yudono's natural hot springs.

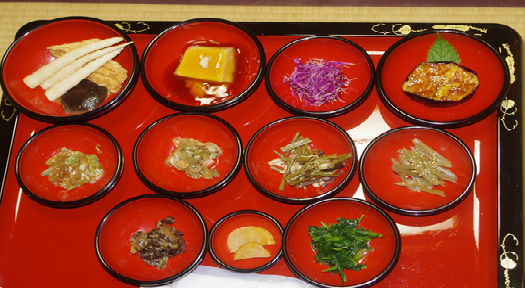
Shôjin ryôri at Saikan (Mt. Haguro)

Shôjin ryôri (精進料理, lit. "food for spiritual elevation"), a vegan food traditionally consumed by Yamabushi, uses no animal product but sansai 山菜 ("Mountain vegetables") instead, as well as local rice, handmade gomadôfu (sesame-flavoured tôfu), bamboo shoots, vinegared chrysanthemum flowers and mushrooms. There exist many different types of shôjin ryôri depending on the shukubo (temples that also welcome travellers for the night) that is serving it, but it usually consists of many small dishes accompanied with miso soup and white rice.

==== National treasures ====
Mt. Haguro hosts The Five-Storied Pagoda (gojûnotô 五重塔), one of Japan's National Treasures. The pagoda's central pillar protects it from earthquakes, which inspired Tokyo's Skytree's architecture. Also in the grounds of Mt. Haguro is the Jiji-sugi 爺杉 ("Grandpa cedar"), a 30m high cedar that is more than 1000 years old.

=== Culinary culture ===
==== Heritage and creativity ====
In 2014 Tsuruoka was registered as a UNESCO Creative City of Gastronomy. It's more than 50 species of "ancestral food" (zairai sakumotsu 在来作物) that exist and have remained intact for several centuries now are one of the reasons why the city has received this title. Among these there are: minden nasu 民田なす (a round eggplant with a long and thin hat), karatori imo からとりいも (spiciness-reducer potato), atsumi kabu 温海かぶ (Atsumi turnip, a red turnip that grows on steep slopes), ootaki carrot 大滝ニンジン, etc. The presence of such heritage foods is not the only reason why Tsuruoka has been registered as a Creative City of Gastronomy. Its particular way to cook these ingredients was even more persuasive. Tsuruoka's best known specialties are kandarajiru 寒鱈汁 (a soup containing black cod fished during the winter – the period when it is supposed to be tastiest), gomadôfu ごま豆腐 (sesame-flavoured tôfu), tochimochi とちもち (chestnut flavoured pounded rice cake), kitsunemen キツネ面 (fox mask shaped brown sugar biscuit), etc.

The city is also known for its large variety of soups (it is said that the harsh winters is the reason why there are so many types), apart from kandarajiru, there is takenokojiru タケノコ汁 (Mt Gassan bamboo shoot soup), imoni 芋煮 (potato soup), nattôjiru 納豆汁 (nattô based soup), môsô jiru (another type of bamboo soup).

==== Beans ====
Tsuruoka is known for dadacha-mame (だだちゃ豆), a species of soybean, which have been called "the king of edamame"; they are also used for other products such as nattō and in manjū. There are two theories as to the origin of the name: one is that it derives from dadacha, the Shonai dialect word for "father" – gagacha is the dialectical word for "mother", while the other is that the beans came from Date, Fukushima, and were originally called Date-no-chamame, which became Date-chamame and then Dadacha-mame.

Dadachamame are served in many ways: sweet, salty, spicy, bitter, sour, just boiled, crushed, grilled, and in sauces.

Dadakko (だだっ子), are small cakes which contain a sweet dadachamame paste. Dadappai (だだっパイ) are small dadachamame pasted inside a puff pastry. There are also dadachamame flavored ice creams, cookies, biscuits, and creams.

==== Seafood ====
Tsuruoka and the whole region of Shônai benefit from a variety of fishes and seafood coming from the Sea of Japan. Among all the local seafoods are: Cherry salmon, Japanese seabream, blue crab, littlemouth flounder, flatfish, black rockfish, tonguefish, flying squid, oyster, sea robin, sandfish, Japanese codfish, and others. The variety of fresh local fish and seafood in Tsuruoka had contributed to the local sushi shops' reputation, but it has also helped constitute a particular kind of "family gastronomy," where fish hold an important place.

==== Rice ====
The rice cultivated in Tsuruoka and more generally in the Shonai region has been recognized for its strong umami taste. In 2010, researchers from Keiô University's Institute for Advanced Biosciences 慶應義塾大学先端生命科学研究所 demonstrated that Tsuyahime, the local rice variety, contained 1.5x more umami taste than the common other variety of rice thanks to the studies of metabolomes.

=== Arts and crafts ===
The city is surrounded by plains, forests and mountains. Thus, wood and grass were widely used in all kinds of crafts. As for architecture, thatch-roofed houses (kayabukiyane かやぶき屋根) are one of the symbols of the city. Some of them remained in good condition through centuries now, as for example, the Tasôminka 多層民家 (the many-layered house), a traditional farm house from the Meiji period, and the house on display at the Chidô Museum 致道博物館.

Concerning clothing, shinaori しな織り, is a traditional weaving style from tree bark that is still practiced these days. The items created with this solid and firm thread are very resistant and waterproof.

== Local attractions ==
- Yamabushi Training at the Ideha Culture Museum (いでは文化記念館, "Ideha Bunka Kinenkan")
- Mt. Haguro
- Zenpō Temple (善宝寺, - Where, in 1990, a carp with a human-like face was seen in a pond on the temple grounds.)
- Chido Museum (到道博物館,“Chido Hakubutsukan”)
- Shōnai Shrine
- Yutagawa Hot Spring
- Yunohama Hot Spring
- Atsumi Hot Spring
- Dewa-no-Yuki Shuzō Museum (Dewanoyuki Sake Brewing Museum)
- Tsuruoka Art Forum
- Dewa Shōnai Kokusai Mura International Forum and the Amazon Folk Museum
- Gassan Asahi Museum
- Tsuruoka Kamo Aquarium (加茂水族館, “Kamo-Suizokukan”.This is registered in Guinness for the number of jellyfish exhibits.)

== Local events ==
- Saitansai (New Year Ceremony) in Mt. Haguro Shrine - January 1
- Ogisai Kurokawa Noh (Noh Festival) in Kushibiki - February 1 to 2
- Oyama Sake Festival - Middle of February
- Mt. Yudono Ski Festival in Mt. Yudono - From middle to late February
- Tsuruoka Hinamatsuri in Shonai Temple and Chido Museum - March
- Tsuruoka Sakura Festival in Tsuruoka Park - From middle to late April
- Tulip Festival in Ikoi Village Shonai - From late April to Early May
- Amazon Kid Festival in Gassan Asahi Village - May 3 to 5
- Ceremony for Women and Children in Mt. Haguro Shrine - May 5
- Kinen-sai (Prayer service for a good crop) in Mt. Haguro Shrine - May 8
- International Nordic Walk in Yunohama - Middle of May
- Tenjin Festival - May 25
- Oyama Dog Festival - June 5
- Yutagawa Hot Spring Hotaru Matsuri (Firefly Festival) - June 15 to August 10
- Flower Festival in Mt. Haguro - July 15
- Gassan Shrine Festival in Mt. Gassan - July 15
- International Bungee jumping in Gassan Asahi Village - Middle of July
- Edamame Shop Open in Shirayama - Late July to Late August
- Akagawa Fireworks Festival - Middle of August
- Oku no Hosomichi National Haiku Competition at Ideha Bunka Kinenkan - Middle of September
- Experience:Yamabushi Training at Ideha Bunka Kinenkan - Middle of September
- Miss Shonai Contest - Late October
- Shonai Hyakuman-goku Festival - Early November
- Shôreisai 松例祭 - Last day of December. Through different rites involving trees and fire, Yamabushi pray for a good rice harvest and the good health of crops.

== International relations ==
=== Sister cities ===
Tsuruoka is twinned with:

- Kagoshima, Kagoshima, Japan
- (Japan) Kikonai, Hokkaido, since April 27, 1989
- La Foa, New Caledonia
- New Brunswick, New Jersey, United States, since June 10, 1960
- Shangzhi, Heilongjiang, China

== Notable people from Tsuruoka ==
- Ryo Chonan, mixed martial artist
- Shuhei Fujisawa, writer
- Takashi Ishikawa, sumo wrestler
- Kanji Ishiwara, general in the Imperial Japanese Army
- Yuya Hasegawa, professional baseball player
- Ishirō Honda, movie director
- Koichi Kato, politician
- Rentaro Kita, musician
- Saiichi Maruya, writer and literary critic
- Satō Tetsutarō, admiral in the Imperial Japanese Navy
- Shin Togashi, movie director
- Kashiwado Tsuyoshi, sumo wrestler
- Shōichi Watanabe, English scholar
- Tomegoro Yoshizumi, spy and defector to Indonesia
