= Amarume, Yamagata =

Dissolved municipality in Higashitagawa district, Yamagata prefecture, Japan

Coordinates: 38°50′N 139°53′E

Amarume (余目町, Amarume-machi) was a town located in Higashitagawa District, Yamagata Prefecture, Japan.

On 1 July 2005, Amarume, along with the town of Tachikawa (also from Higashitagawa District), was merged to create the town of Shōnai.
