= Tachikawa, Yamagata =

Dissolved municipality in Yamagata prefecture, Japan

Tachikawa (立川町, Tachikawa-machi) was a town located in Higashitagawa District), Yamagata Prefecture, Japan.

On July 1, 2005, Tachikawa, along with the town of Amarume (also from Higashitagawa District, was merged to create the town of Shōnai.
