= Akumi District =

District in Yamagata prefecture, Japan

Coordinates: 39°01′N 139°54′E

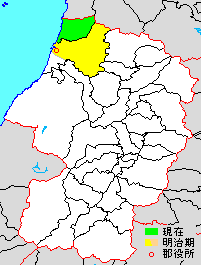
Map showing the original extent of Akumi District in Yamagata Prefecture colored area=original extent in Meiji period; green=present area

Akumi District (飽海郡, Akumi-gun) is a rural district located in Yamagata Prefecture, Japan.

In August 2013, the district had an estimated population of 14,695 and an area of 208.41 km^{2}. All of the city of Sakata north of the Mogami River was formerly part of the Akumi District.

== Towns and villages ==
- Yuza

== History ==
Akumi County was formerly part of Dewa Province, and was mentioned in the Engishiki records of the early Heian period. The area came to be known as Yuza District from the Sengoku period through the Edo period. Under the Tokugawa shogunate, much of the area was ruled as part of Tsuruoka Domain or its subsidiary domain, Matsumine Domain. Following the Meiji restoration it came under the new province of Uzen Province, which became part of Yamagata Prefecture in 1876. At that time, the area consisted of two towns and 154 villages. The area became and was organized as Akumi District in 1878.

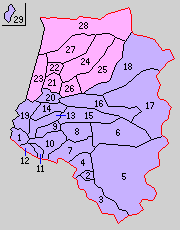
Historic Map of Akumi District: Purple= Sakata City: 1. Sakata; 2. Matsumine; 3. Kamigō; 4. Uchigō; 5. Tazawa; 6. Kitamata; 7. Minami-Hirata; 8. Higashi-Hirata; 9. Kita-Hirata; 10. Naka-Hirata; 11. Nishi-Hirata; 12. Udogawara; 13. Ueda; 14. Mototake; 15. Ichijō; 16. Kannonji; 17. Ozawa; 18. Nikkō; 19. Nishi-Arase; 20. Minami-Arase; Pink=Yuza Town: 21. Inada; 22. Kawatsura; 23. Nishi-Yusa; 24. Yusa; 25. Warabioka; 26. Ichigo; 27. Takase; 28. Fukura; 29. Tobishima

With the establishment of the municipality system on April 1, 1889, two towns (Sakata and Matsumine) and 27 villages were established. akata was raised to city status on April 1, 1933, and Yura was raised to town status on April 1, 1941. The town of Yawata was created on December 1, 1954, and Hirata was elevated to town status on August 1, 1964. On November 1, 2005, as part of the Heisei period Municipal mergers and dissolutions in Japan, the city of Sakata and the towns of Hirata, Matsuyama and Yawata merged to form the new city of Sakata.
