= Atsumi, Yamagata =

Dissolved municipality in Yamagata prefecture, Japan

Coordinates: 38.622°N 139.600°E

Atsumi (温海町, Atsumi-machi) was a town located in Nishitagawa District, Yamagata Prefecture, Japan.

As of 2003, the town had an estimated population of 9,921 and a density of 38.84 persons per km^{2}. The total area was 255.40 km^{2}.

On 1 October 2005, Atsumi, along with the towns of Fujishima, Haguro and Kushibiki, and the village of Asahi (all from Higashitagawa District), was merged into the expanded city of Tsuruoka, and no longer exists as an independent municipality.
