= Kushibiki, Yamagata =

Dissolved municipality in Yamagata prefecture, Japan

Kushibiki (櫛引町, Kushibiki-machi) was a town located in Higashitagawa District, Yamagata Prefecture, Japan.

As of 2003, the town had an estimated population of 8,213 and a density of 102.43 persons per km^{2}. The total area was 80.18 km^{2}.

On October 1, 2005, Kushibiki, along with the towns of Fujishima and Haguro, the village of Asahi (all from Higashitagawa District), and the town of Atsumi (from Nishitagawa District), was merged into the expanded city of Tsuruoka, and no longer exists as an independent municipality.
