= Fujishima Station =

Railway station in Tsuruoka, Yamagata Prefecture, Japan

Fujishima Station 藤島駅
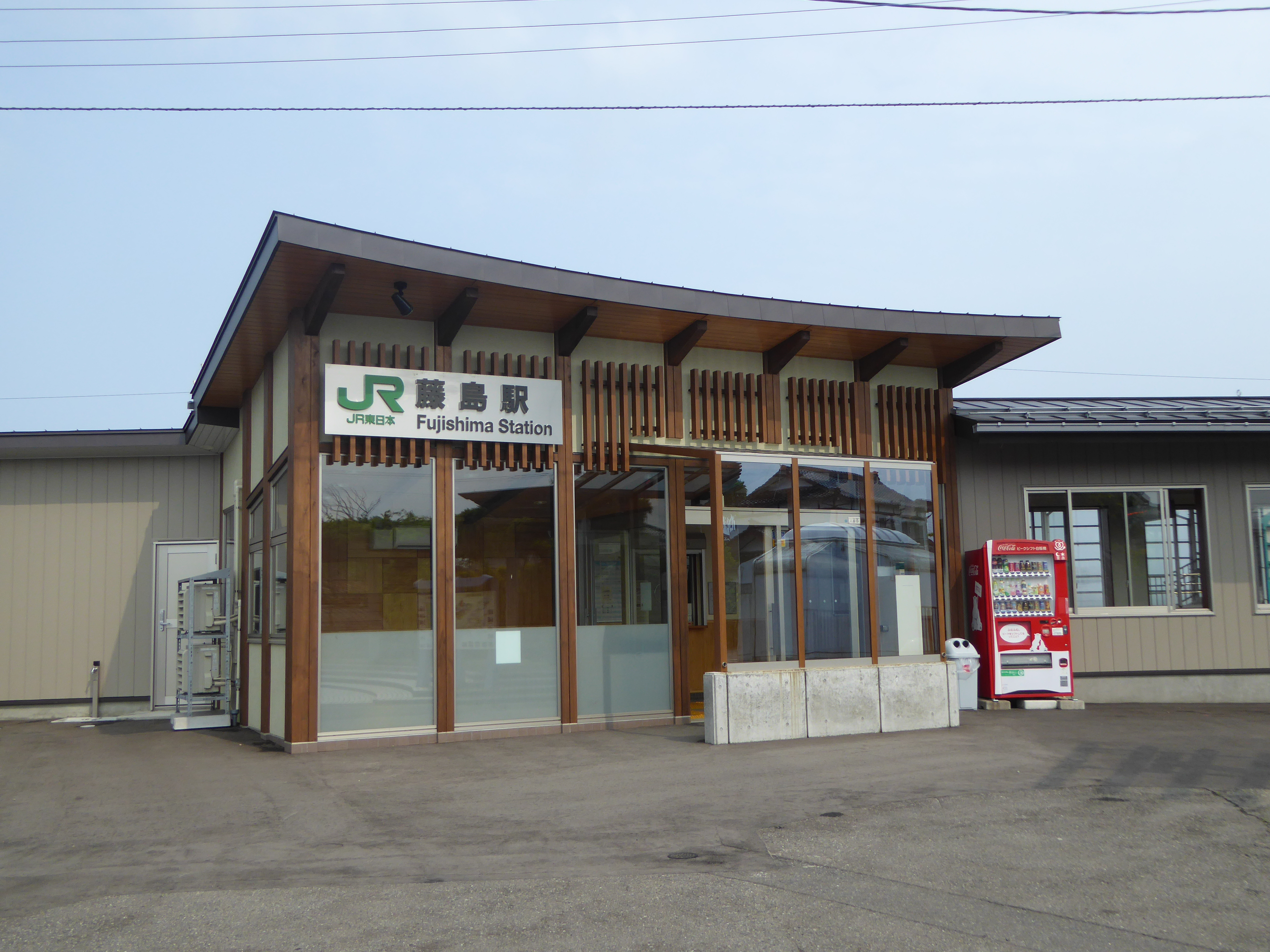
- Fujishima Station Building, 2017

General information
- Location: Kami-Fujishima, Tsuruoka-shi, Yamagata-ken; Japan
- Coordinates: 38°46′7.1″N 139°53′38.7″E
- Operator: JR East
- Line: ■ Uetsu Main Line
- Distance: 146.0 kilometers from Niitsu
- Platforms: 1 island platform

Other information
- Status: Staffed
- Website: Official website

History
- Opened: September 1, 1918

Passengers
- FY2018: 280

Services
Preceding station	JR East	Following station
Tsuruoka towards Niitsu	Uetsu Main Line	Nishibukuro towards Akita
Location
- Location within Yamagata Prefecture Location within Japan

Fujishima Station (藤島駅, Fujishima eki) is a railway station located in the city of Tsuruoka, Yamagata, Japan, operated by the East Japan Railway Company (JR East).

== Lines ==
Fujishima Station is served by the Uetsu Main Line, and is located 146.0 kilometres (90.7 mi) rail kilometers from the terminus of the line at Niitsu Station.

== Station layout ==
The station has a single island platform connected to the station building by a footbridge. The station is staffed.

=== Platforms ===
1	■ Uetsu Main Line	for Tsuruoka, Atsumi Onsen and Murakami
2	■ Uetsu Main Line	for Amarume, Sakata and Akita

== History ==
Fujishima Station was opened on September 1, 1918. With the privatization of the JNR on April 1, 1987, the station came under the control of the East Japan Railway Company. The station building was rebuilt in 2016.

== Passenger statistics ==
In fiscal 2018, the station was used by an average of 280 passengers daily (boarding passengers only),

== Surrounding area ==
- Former Fujishima Town Hall
- Shonai Agricultural High School
- Fujishima Post Office

== See also ==
- List of railway stations in Japan
