= Yawata, Yamagata =

Dissolved municipality in Yamagata prefecture, Japan

Yawata (八幡町, Yawata-machi) was a town located in Akumi District, Yamagata Prefecture, Japan.

As of 2003, the town had an estimated population of 7,114 and a density of 34.74 persons per km^{2}. The total area was 204.76 km^{2}.

On November 1, 2005, Yawata, along with the towns of Hirata and Matsuyama (all from Akumi District), was merged into the expanded city of Sakata.
