= Hirata, Yamagata =

Dissolved municipality in Yamagata prefecture, Japan

Hirata (平田町, Hirata-machi) was a town located in Akumi District, Yamagata Prefecture, Japan.

As of 2003, the town had an estimated population of 7,065 and a population density of 39.42 persons per km^{2}. The total area was 179.22 km^{2}.

On November 1, 2005, Hirata, along with the towns of Matsuyama and Yawata (all from Akumi District), was merged into the expanded city of Sakata.
