= Matsuyama, Yamagata =

Dissolved municipality in Yamagata prefecture, Japan

Matsuyama (松山町, Matsuyama-machi) was a town located in Akumi District, Yamagata Prefecture in Japan.

In 2003, the town had an estimated population of 5,426 and a population density of 126.42 per square kilometre (327.4/sq mi). The total area was 42.92 square kilometres (16.57 sq mi).

On November 1, 2005, Matsuyama, along with the towns of Hirata and Yawata (all from Akumi District), was merged into the expanded city of Sakata.
