= Tohoku University of Community Service and Science =

Private university in Yamagata, Japan

Coordinates: 38°53′35.9″N 139°49′10.3″E

Koeki University (Tohoku University of Community Service and Science)
- 東北公益文科大学
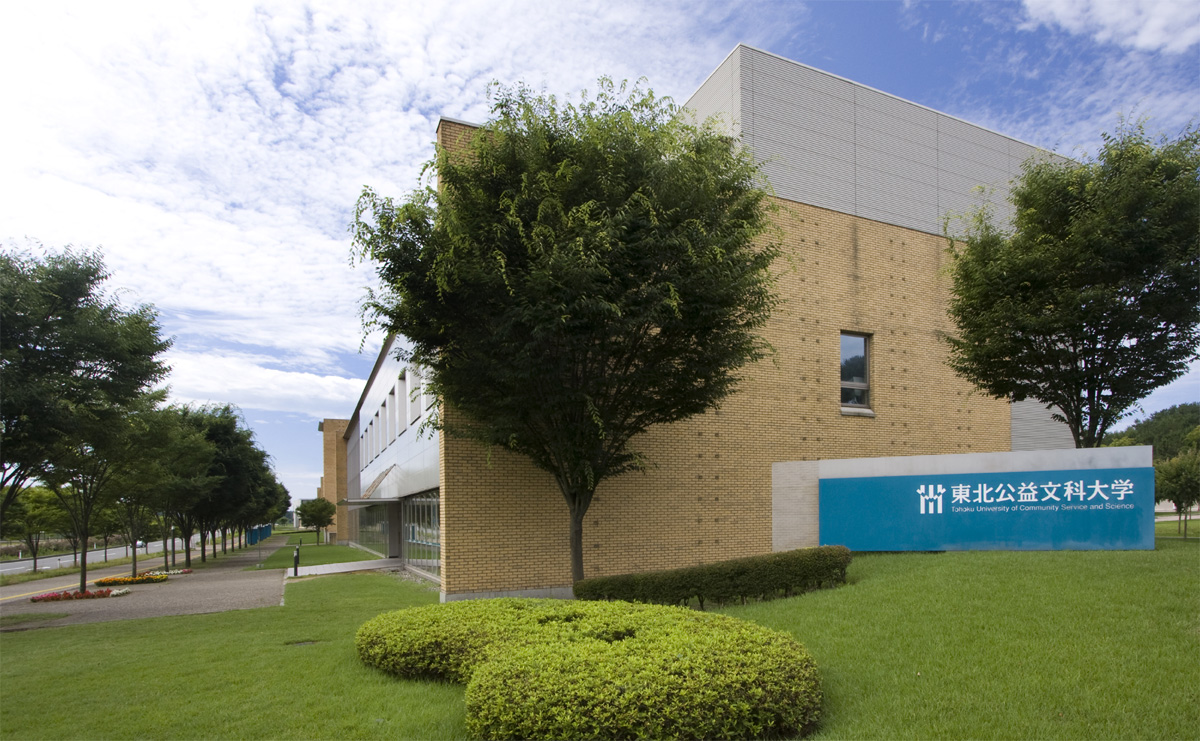
- Type: Private
- Established: 2001
- Chairman: Kaichi Nitta
- President: Noboru Yoshimura
- Location: Sakata, Yamagata, Japan
- Website: http://www.koeki-u.ac.jp/

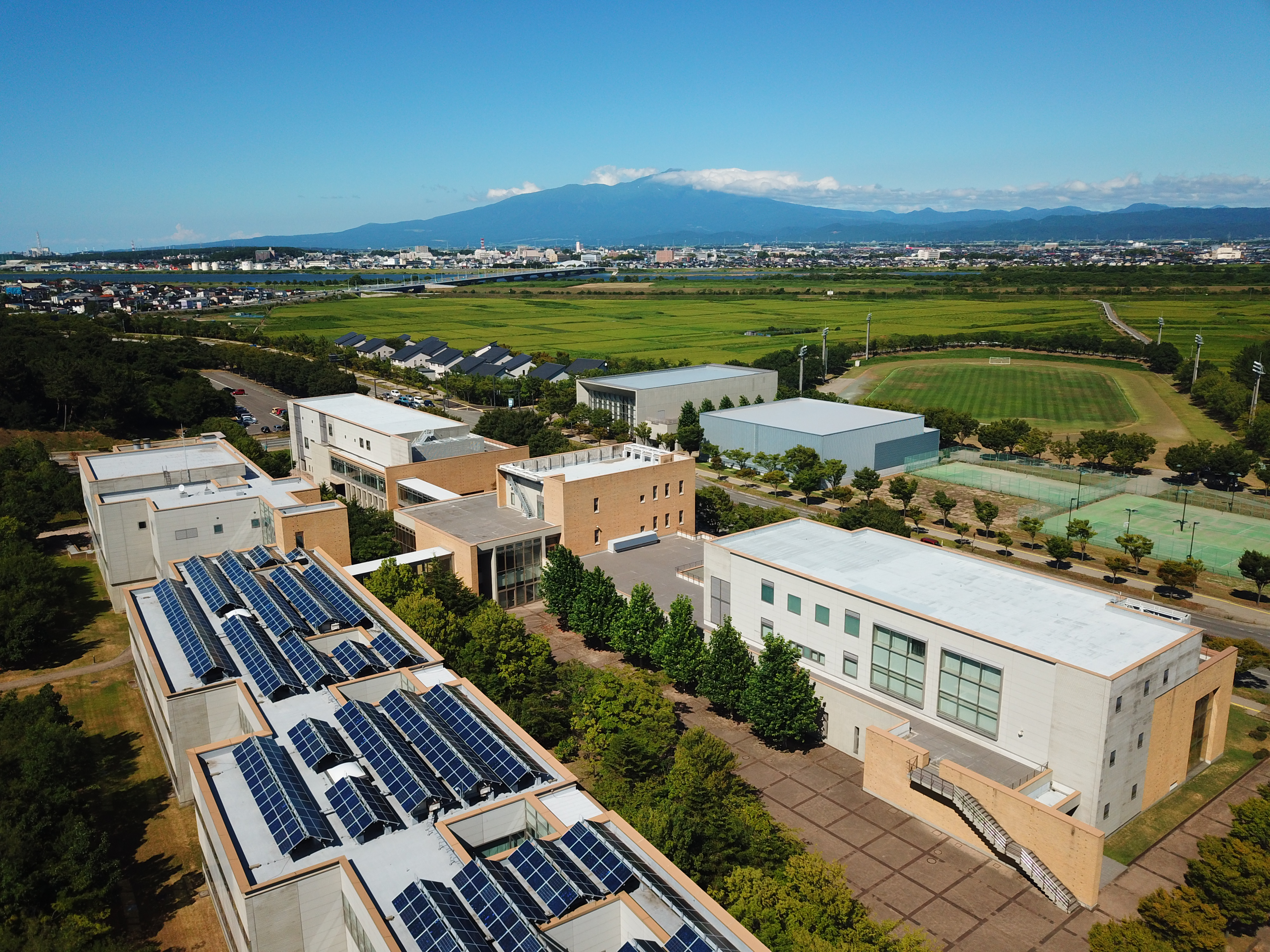

Koeki University (Tohoku University of Community Service and Science) (東北公益文科大学, Tōhoku kōeki bunka daigaku) is a Japanese private university, located in Sakata, Yamagata, Japan.

== History ==
Koeki University (The Tohoku University of Community Service and Science) was established in 2001 by the prefectural government of Yamagata Prefecture, and 14 municipalities in the Shonai region of northwestern Yamagata, with the assistance of Keio University in Tokyo. A graduate program was established in 2005 and a research institute in 2006. A doctoral program was established in 2007.
