= Sakata, Yamagata =

Sakata 酒田市
- City
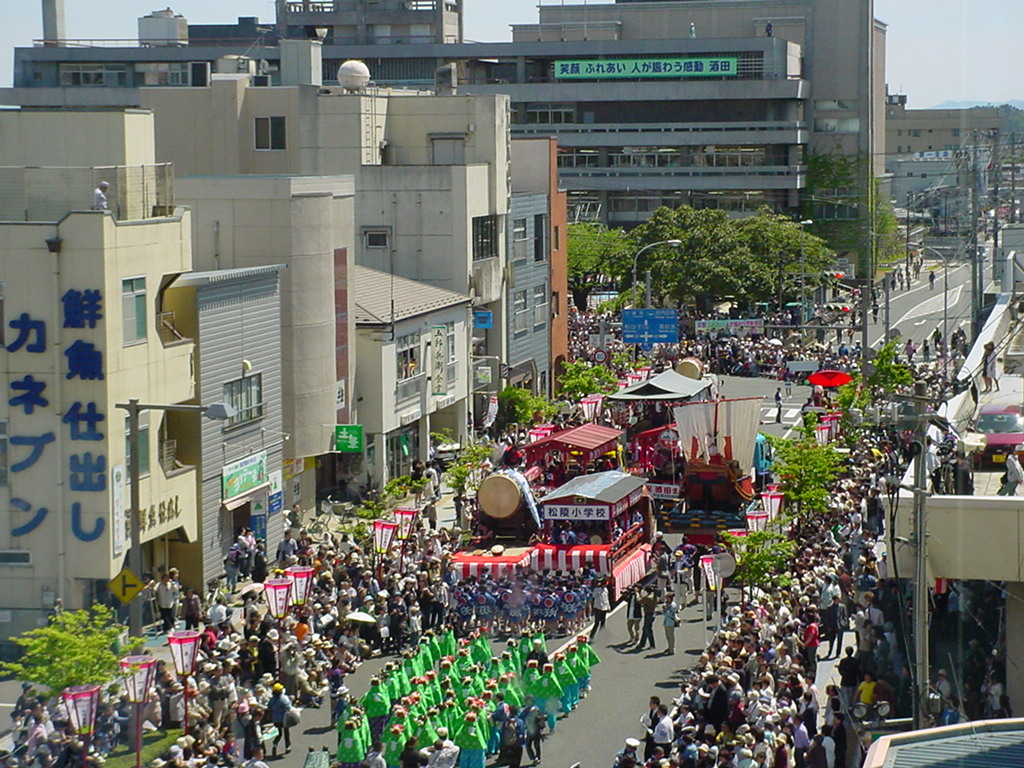
- Sakata Festival, held annually in May

- Flag Seal
- Location of Sakata in Yamagata Prefecture

- Coordinates: 38°54′52.1″N 139°50′11.2″E
- Country: Japan
- Region: Tōhoku
- Prefecture: Yamagata

Government
  - Mayor: Itaru Maruyama (from September 2015)

Area
  - Total: 602.97 km^{2} (232.81 sq mi)

Population (March 31, 2023)
  - Total: 96,777
  - Density: 160.50/km^{2} (415.69/sq mi)
- Time zone: UTC+9 (Japan Standard Time)
- Phone number: 0234-22-5111
- Address: 2-2-45, Honchō, Sakata-shi, Yamagata-ken 998-8540
- Climate: Cfa
- Website: Official website
- Symbols
- Bird: Aquila chrysaetos
- Flower: Hemerocallis
- Tree: Zelkova

Sakata (酒田市, Sakata-shi) is a city located in Yamagata Prefecture, Japan. As of 31 March 2023, the city had an estimated population of 96,777 in 42,600 households, and a population density of 180 people per km^{2}. The total area of the city is 602.97 km^{2} (232.81 sq mi).

== Geography ==
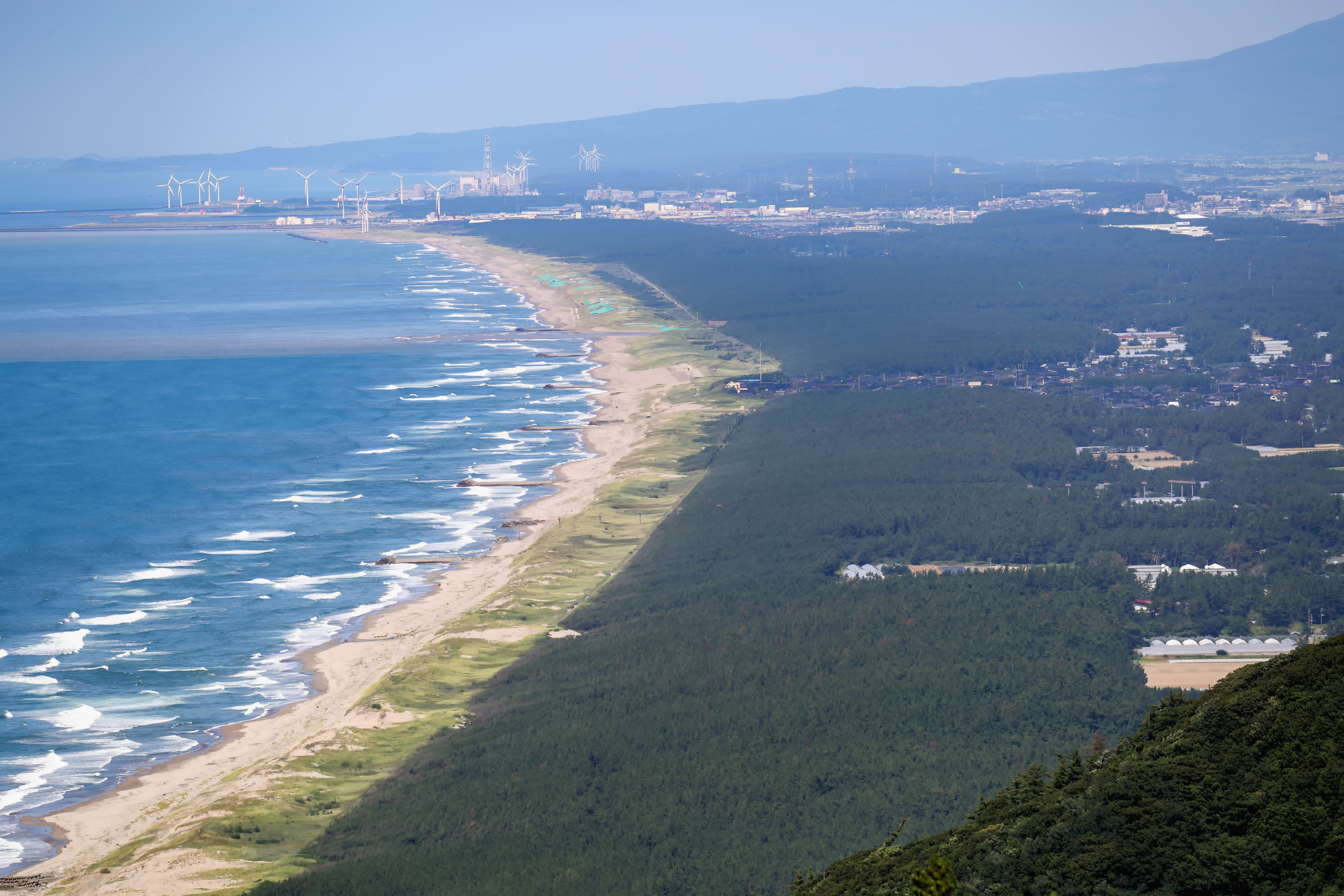
Shonai Sand Dunes

Sakata is located in the coastal plains of the northwest corner of Yamagata Prefecture, bordered by the Sea of Japan to the west, and by Akita Prefecture to the north. The city has Mount Chōkai on its northern border; however, the urban center is in the flatlands of the Shōnai Plains on the right bank of the Mogami River. The inhabited island of Tobishima, approximately 38 kilometres (24 mi) off the coast of the mainland, is within the administrative borders of the city. The island, as well as part of the mainland portion of the city, is within the borders of the Chōkai Quasi-National Park.

=== Neighboring municipalities ===
Akita Prefecture

- Nikaho
- Yurihonjō

Yamagata Prefecture

- Mamurogawa
- Mikawa
- Sakegawa
- Shōnai
- Tozawa
- Tsuruoka
- Yuza

=== Climate ===
Sakata has a humid subtropical climate (Köppen climate classification Cfa) with large seasonal temperature differences, with warm to hot (and often humid) summers and cold (sometimes severely cold) winters. Precipitation is significant throughout the year, but is heaviest from August to October. The average annual temperature in Sakata is 13.0 °C (55.4 °F). The average annual rainfall is 1,986.8 mm (78.22 in) with November as the wettest month. The temperatures are highest on average in August, at around 25.5 °C (77.9 °F), and lowest in January, at around 1.9 °C (35.4 °F).

Climate data for Sakata (elevation 3.1 m, 1991–2020 normals, extremes 1937–present)
Month	Jan	Feb	Mar	Apr	May	Jun	Jul	Aug	Sep	Oct	Nov	Dec	Year
Record high °C (°F)	15.5 (59.9)	21.6 (70.9)	22.7 (72.9)	29.9 (85.8)	31.3 (88.3)	34.2 (93.6)	37.7 (99.9)	40.1 (104.2)	36.8 (98.2)	32.1 (89.8)	25.8 (78.4)	19.0 (66.2)	40.1 (104.2)
Mean maximum °C (°F)	10.1 (50.2)	12.4 (54.3)	17.5 (63.5)	23.9 (75.0)	28.2 (82.8)	30.3 (86.5)	33.5 (92.3)	35.0 (95.0)	32.4 (90.3)	26.3 (79.3)	20.5 (68.9)	14.2 (57.6)	35.5 (95.9)
Mean daily maximum °C (°F)	4.5 (40.1)	5.2 (41.4)	8.9 (48.0)	14.8 (58.6)	20.3 (68.5)	24.1 (75.4)	27.6 (81.7)	29.7 (85.5)	25.8 (78.4)	19.8 (67.6)	13.6 (56.5)	7.6 (45.7)	16.8 (62.2)
Daily mean °C (°F)	1.9 (35.4)	2.2 (36.0)	5.1 (41.2)	10.2 (50.4)	15.7 (60.3)	20.0 (68.0)	23.8 (74.8)	25.5 (77.9)	21.6 (70.9)	15.6 (60.1)	9.7 (49.5)	4.5 (40.1)	13.0 (55.4)
Mean daily minimum °C (°F)	−0.6 (30.9)	−0.8 (30.6)	1.4 (34.5)	5.8 (42.4)	11.6 (52.9)	16.5 (61.7)	20.7 (69.3)	22.0 (71.6)	17.8 (64.0)	11.6 (52.9)	5.9 (42.6)	1.6 (34.9)	9.5 (49.1)
Mean minimum °C (°F)	−4.4 (24.1)	−5.0 (23.0)	−2.6 (27.3)	0.2 (32.4)	6.0 (42.8)	11.6 (52.9)	16.4 (61.5)	17.4 (63.3)	11.6 (52.9)	6.0 (42.8)	0.7 (33.3)	−2.4 (27.7)	−5.6 (21.9)
Record low °C (°F)	−16.9 (1.6)	−12.8 (9.0)	−9.9 (14.2)	−3.7 (25.3)	−0.2 (31.6)	7.5 (45.5)	9.5 (49.1)	13.2 (55.8)	7.0 (44.6)	1.4 (34.5)	−5.1 (22.8)	−12.5 (9.5)	−16.9 (1.6)
Average precipitation mm (inches)	177.7 (7.00)	118.4 (4.66)	111.1 (4.37)	103.6 (4.08)	122.6 (4.83)	125.3 (4.93)	218.7 (8.61)	205.6 (8.09)	176.2 (6.94)	188.6 (7.43)	222.0 (8.74)	217.0 (8.54)	1,986.8 (78.22)
Average snowfall cm (inches)	85 (33)	62 (24)	20 (7.9)	0 (0)	0 (0)	0 (0)	0 (0)	0 (0)	0 (0)	0 (0)	3 (1.2)	40 (16)	211 (83)
Average precipitation days (≥ 0.5 mm)	26.3	21.9	19.1	13.6	12.7	11.6	14.0	12.1	14.4	16.1	20.7	25.3	207.9
Average snowy days (≥ 1 cm)	18.3	15.2	5.8	0.3	0.0	0.0	0.0	0.0	0.0	0.0	0.5	9.2	49.2
Average relative humidity (%)	72	70	67	67	71	75	79	76	75	72	71	71	72
Mean monthly sunshine hours	36.8	60.1	115.1	169.0	194.7	181.9	159.5	199.5	156.8	136.1	84.3	41.7	1,538.8
Source: Japan Meteorological Agency (1991–2020 normals, extremes 1937–present)

== Demographics ==
According to Japanese census data, the population of Sakata has declined in recent decades.

Historical population
Year	Pop.	±% p.a.
1920	88,948	—
1930	99,112	+1.09%
1940	99,103	−0.00%
1950	125,734	+2.41%
1960	127,229	+0.12%
1970	120,212	−0.57%
1980	125,622	+0.44%
1990	122,850	−0.22%
2000	121,614	−0.10%
2010	111,151	−0.90%
2020	100,273	−1.02%

== History ==
The area of present-day Sakata was the location of the provincial capital of ancient Dewa Province, although the precise location has yet to be discovered by archaeologists. A port at the mouth of the Mogami River is known to have existed since the Kamakura period. Although silting rendered it less important in the Muromachi period, the area developed as a major center for the kitamaebune coastal trade during the Edo period. By the early Meiji period, the Honma clan, a local merchant clan, dominated trade and emerged as the largest landholder in Japan. Traces of their powerful influence on Sakata City can still be seen across the city. This includes the Honma Museum and The Honma Gardens located in the downtown area.

With the establishment of the modern municipalities system after the start of the Meiji period, the area was organized as Sakata Town under Akumi District, Yamagata Prefecture in 1878. Approximately 80% of the town was destroyed by the 1894 Shōnai earthquake and subsequent fires. The modern city of Sakata was founded on April 1, 1933.

=== World War II ===
The city largely escaped damage during World War II, save for a lone air raid on its port district on August 10, 1945, which left 30 people dead or missing.

On September 20, 1944, over 200 British prisoners of war transfer to the newly created POW camp, known officially as Sakata Branch Camp (Sendai 9-B). The British would later be joined by American, Dutch and Australian POW's. The camp was liberated in September 1945. The camp was originally established as Tokyo 22B, jurisdictional transferred to Sendai on April 14, 1945. The camp roster included:

- 15 Americans, no deaths
- 248 British, 13 deceased
- 5 Dutch, no deaths
- 26 Australians, 5 deceased

Most of the POW's were transferred from camps in the Osaka and Tokyo area and many had survived the sinking of the steamships Kachidoki Maru and Rakuyo Maru. The men were used as forced labor at the Port of Sakata and some worked for Nittsu, also known as Nippon Express, still operating in Japan today.

=== After World War II ===
On October 29, 1976, Sakata suffered from a major fire which gutted 22.5 hectares of its city center, destroying 1,774 buildings and injuring 964 people (and one fatality).

On November 1, 2005, the towns of Hirata, Matsuyama, and Yawata (all from Akumi District) were merged into Sakata.

== Government ==
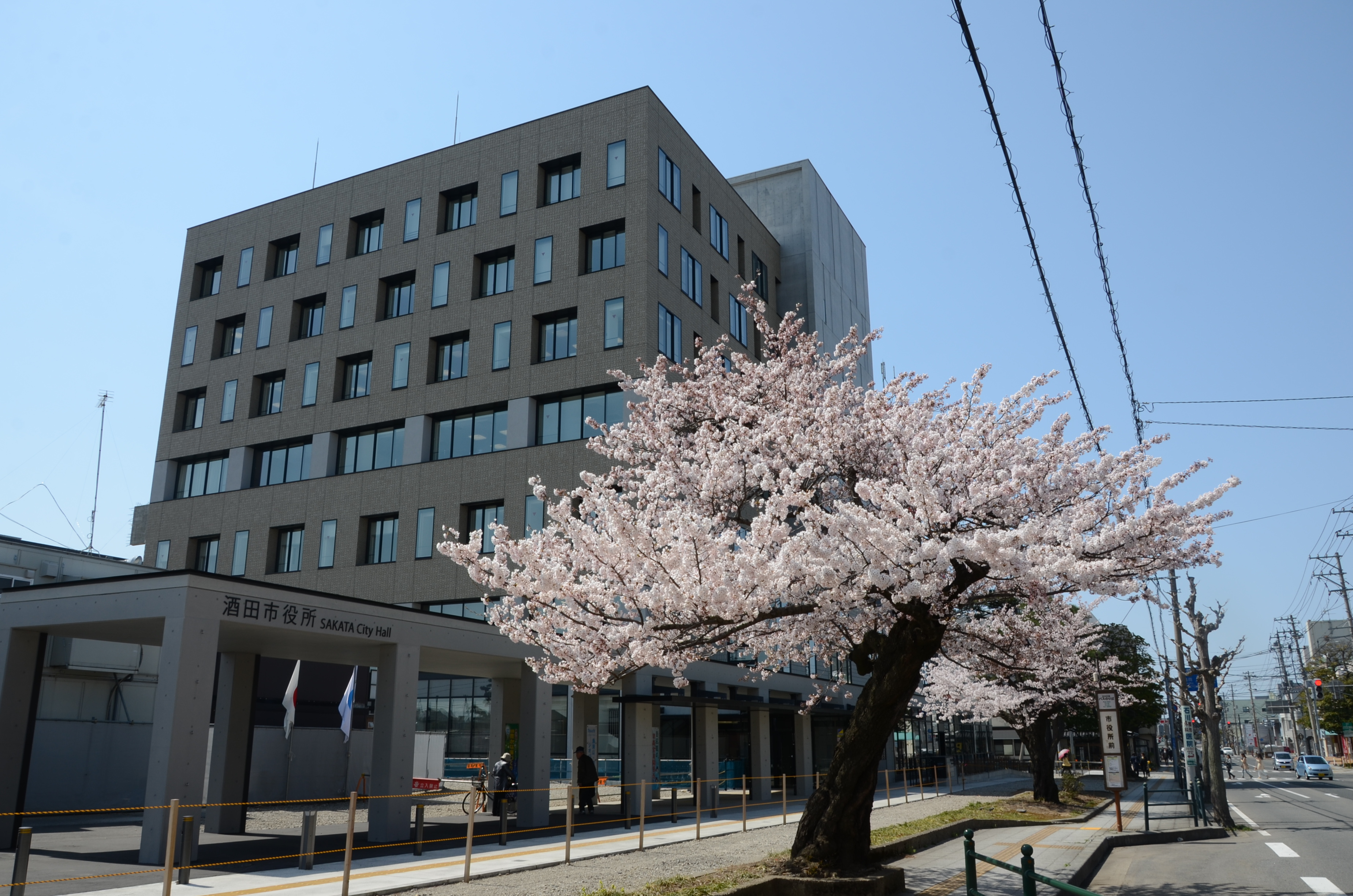
Sakata City Hall

Sakata has a mayor-council form of government with a directly elected mayor and a unicameral city legislature of 28 members. The city contributes five members to the Yamagata Prefectural Assembly. In terms of national politics, the city is part of Yamagata District 3 of the lower house of the Diet of Japan.

== Economy ==
The economy of Sakata is based on light manufacturing, agriculture, and commercial fishing. The Sakata Kyodo Thermal Power Station is a fossil-fueled power station operated by a joint venture of Tohoku Electric and Sumitomo Aluminum in the city.

Major employers include Maeta Seikan, which makes concrete products and has played a major role in supporting reconstruction after the 2011 Tōhoku earthquake and tsunami, Kao, a chemical and cosmetics company and the electronics company, Seiko Epson. Seiko Epson uses the local Shonai Airport for weekly employee charter flights to and from Matsumoto, Nagano since 1997.

== Education ==
=== National universities ===
- Tohoku University of Community Service and Science

=== Vocational schools ===
- Sakata Cooking College
- Sakata Municipal Sakata Nursing College
- Yamagata Prefectural College of Industrial Technology - Shonai Campus

=== High schools ===
- Sakata Minami High School (private)
- Yamagata Prefectural Sakata Higashi High School
- Yamagata Prefectural Sakata Koryo High School
- Yamagata Prefectural Sakata Nishi High School
- Wajunkan High School (private)

=== Junior high schools ===
- Chokai Hachiman Junior High School (private)
- Sakata First Junior High School
- Sakata Second Junior High School
- Sakata Third Junior High School
- Sakata Fourth Junior High School
- Sakata Sixth Junior High School
- Tobu Junior High School (private)

=== Elementary schools ===
- Sakata Chokai Elementary School
- Sakata Fujimi Elementary School
- Sakata Hamada Elementary School
- Sakata Hamanaka Elementary School
- Sakata Hirata Elementary School
- Sakata Hirono Elementary School
- Sakata Ichijo Elementary School
- Sakata Izumi Elementary School
- Sakata Kijo Elementary School
- Sakata Kuromori Elementary School
- Sakata Matsubara Elementary School
- Sakata Matsuryo Elementary School
- Sakata Matsuyama Elementary School
- Sakata Minami Hirata Elementary School
- Sakata Minami Yuza Elementary School
- Sakata Miyanoura Elementary School
- Sakata Niibori Elementary School
- Sakata Nishi Arase Elementary School
- Sakata Takusei Elementary School
- Sakata Tozaka Elementary School
- Sakata Wakahama Elementary School
- Sakata Yawata Elementary School

== Transportation ==
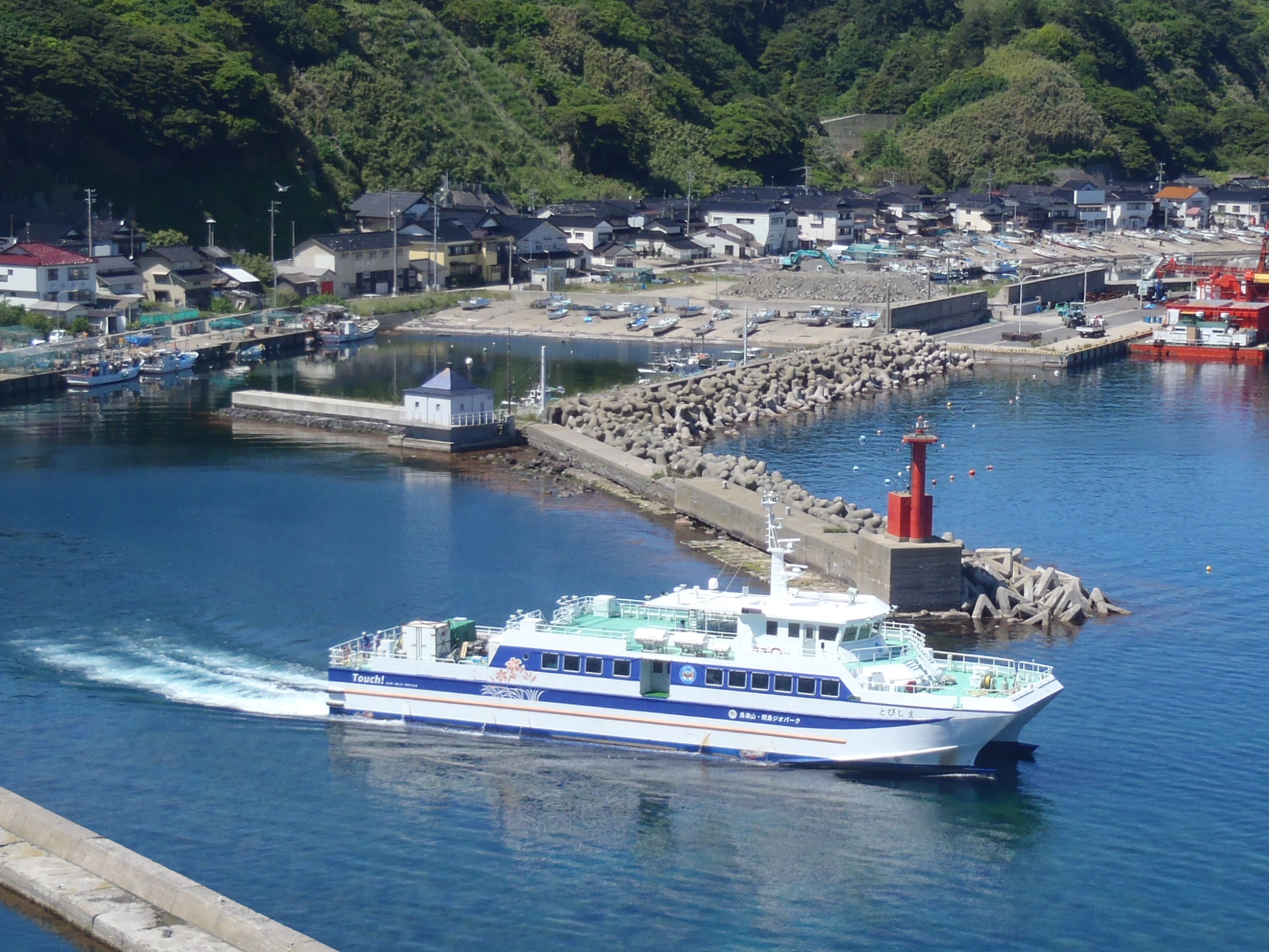
A ferry departing from Tobishima Island

=== Airports ===
- Shonai Airport

=== Railway ===
East Japan Railway Company - Uetsu Main Line

- Sagoshi - Higashi-Sakata - Sakata - Mototate - Minamichōkai

East Japan Railway Company - Rikuu West Line

- Sakata

=== Highway ===
- Nihonkai-Tōhoku Expressway
- Yamagata Expressway: (Sakata, Sakata Minato, and Shōnai Airport interchanges)
- National Route 7
- National Route 47
- National Route 112
- National Route 344
- National Route 345

=== Seaports ===
- Port of Sakata

== Health care ==
- Homma Hospital
- Municipal Sakata Hospital
- Municipal Yawata Hospital
- Prefectural Nihonkai Hospital

== Media ==
=== Cinemas ===
- Sakata Minato-za

=== Newspaper ===
- Shonai Nippo (荘内日報)

=== Television ===
- NHK Sakata Broadcast Station
- TV-U Yamagata Sakata Station
- Sakata Cable Television Station

=== Radio ===
- Sakata FM Radio

== Sister cities ==
- Tangshan, Hebei, China, since July 26, 1990
- Zheleznogorsk-Ilimsky, Irkutsk Oblast, Russia, since October 8, 1979
- Delaware, Ohio, United States, since April 19, 2017
- Pontianak, West Kalimantan, Indonesia

== Culture ==
=== Festivals ===
The Sakata Festival is a major historical festival held every year between May 19 and May 21. The first festival was held in 1609, during the Edo period, and was called the Sannō Matsuri (山王祭, lit. 'Sannō Festival'). However, after a large fire damaged much of Sakata in 1976, the festival became a memorial event and was renamed Sakata Matsuri (酒田祭, lit. 'Sakata Festival'). There is a large parade in the central streets of the city, which features festival floats and dancers from schools, local companies, and community organizations. Huge shishi gashira (獅子頭, lit. 'lion heads') are symbols of the festival. It is said that children chewed by the shishi gashira will become smart and healthy. About 350 stalls line the side of the main street selling snacks, drinks, and crafts.

The celebration of the Sakata Festival was not interrupted by the eruption of Mount Chōkai in 1801, the 1894 Shōnai earthquake, the 1796 and 1976 Great Fires in Sakata, World War I, or World War II; however, it was interrupted in 2020 and 2021, due to prevention measures associated with the worldwide COVID-19 pandemic.

=== Films ===
Sakata was the shooting location for the following movies:

- Okuribito (English title Departures), 2008, winner of the Oscar for best foreign film. Set in present time, a newly unemployed cellist takes a job preparing the dead for funerals.
- Silk, 2007, a film set in the 19th century, about a silkworm merchant and his love life, based on the novel by Alessandro Baricco
- Oshin, 2013, a film about the life of a young girl named Oshin who grew up in poverty in the Sakata region. The film was directed by Shin Togashi.

== Local attractions ==
=== Art and historical museums ===
- Domon Ken Photography Museum – a museum dedicated to Ken Domon, one of the most famous photographers in Japanese history. This is also the only museum in the world that is dedicated to a single photographer.
- Homma Museum of Art – the Honma Museum of Art is a converted old villa which once belonged to the Honma clan. The villa was used by the lords of the Sakai family in the Edo period. Some of the fine arts items in the museum's collection were donated by other clans in Japan, other furniture and fixings belonged to the Honma clan. The museum has a garden from which Mount Chokai can be seen.
- The Historic Abumiya Residence – this museum is a restored home of one of the most famous merchant families in Sakata City. During the 1800s, this city played a key role in domestic trade within Japan. The Abumiya Residence is open for visitors to see how merchants conducted business and how the servants for this family supported them behind the scenes.
- Sakata City Museum of Art – this museum contains a permanent collection which mainly focuses on the work of sculptor Takahashi Go and painter Saito Chozo. The museum is located 20 minutes from Sakata Station and has views of nearby Mount Chōkai.
- Dewa-yushinkan – a Tea House complex located beside Sakata City Museum of Art. It was built in 1994 and has a traditional Japanese design.
- Somaro – a traditional Japanese restaurant dating from the Edo period. The culture of maiko dancing in Sakata is a result of the city's close trading relationship with Osaka and Kyoto. The building has been carefully renovated and contains many traditional features. It also features an art gallery with the personal collection of Hirata Bokujo, a large pork company that is based in Sakata City.
- Sake Museum

=== Famous and historical sites ===
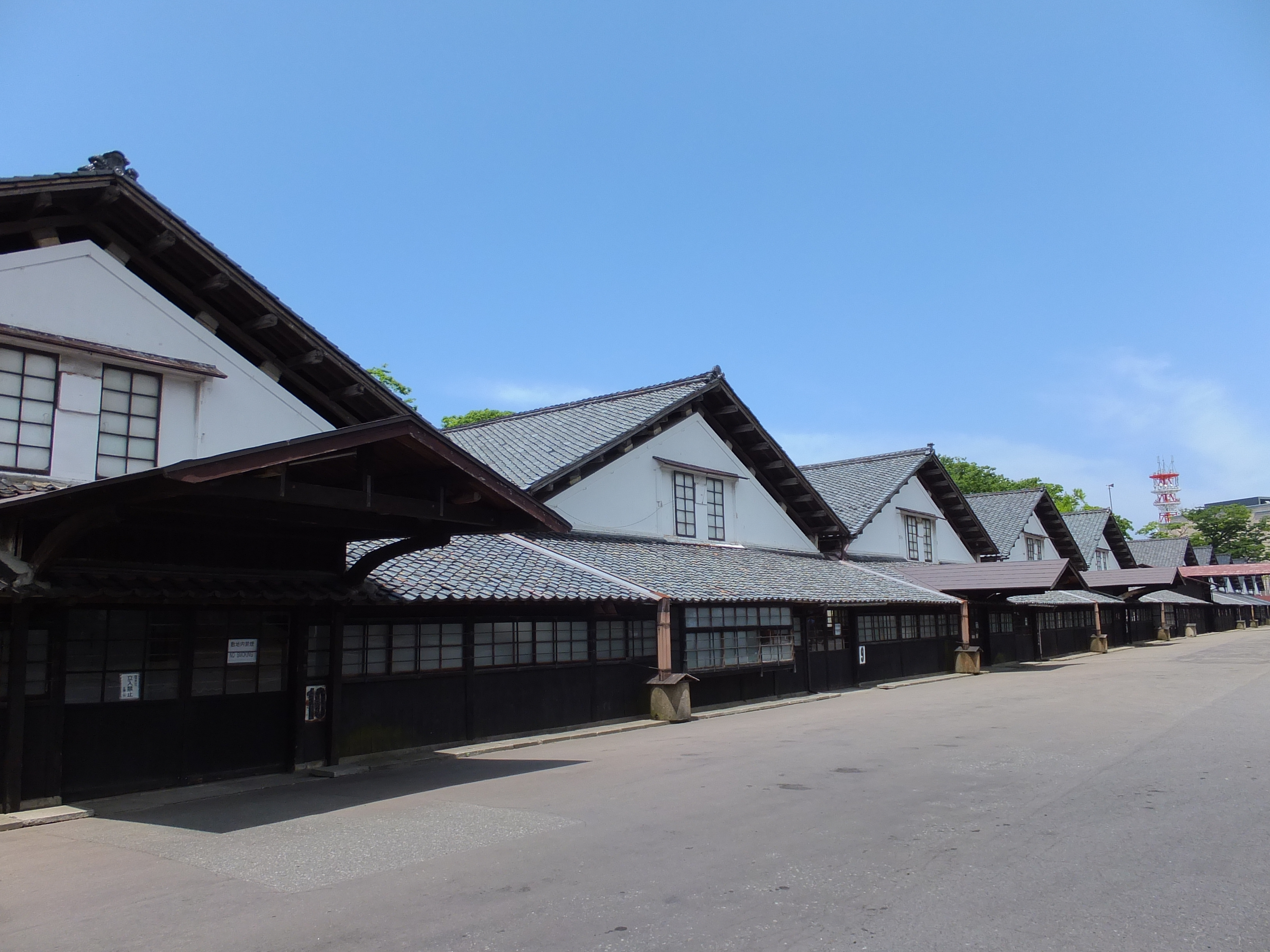
Sankyo Storehouse

- Sankyo Storehouse – this kura was built in 1893 to store rice. On the storehouse's southern side, there is a line of 41 Zelkova trees, which were planted over 150 years ago to help keep the temperature of the storehouses low during the hot summer months. The modern day storehouse contains a small museum with information regarding the history and culture of Sakata, a restaurant and a souvenir shop which sells local foods and sake.
- Hiyoriyama Park – a park located close to the city center which offers panoramic views of the Port of Sakata. There are over 400 cherry trees in the park and it is home to a cherry blossom festival in late April.
- The Historical Honma Residence – a historic residence of a famous merchant clan. This home is located nearby the Historic Abumiya Residence and has many rooms and displays.
- The Kinowa Wall Site
- The Historical Shirasaki Clinic

=== Shrines and temples ===
- Jofuku Temple
- Kaikou-ji Temple – Shingon Buddhism temple located in the centre of Sakata near Hiyoriyama Park. The temple contains the remains of two priests who starved themselves to death through a process of self-mummification called sokushinbutsu.
- Jichi-in Temple – a Buddhist temple at the heart of Sakata City located right next to Hiyoriyama Park and the historic entertainment district of this port city. This temple offers zazen meditation led by the head priest who can speak English.

== Notable people ==
- Chris Broad, British YouTuber, former English instructor from the JET Programme who was assigned to teach in Sakata
- Ken Domon, photographer
- Teiji Honma, ice hockey goaltender
- Kumiko Ikeda, long jumper
- Homma Munehisa, legendary 18th century rice trader
- Haruo Nakajima, Japanese actor, best known for portraying Godzilla from the 1950s through the early 1970s
- Kinnosuke Ogura, mathematician
- Shūmei Ōkawa, nationalist author and politician
- Seiko Shimakage, volleyball player and golfer
- Seizo Sugawara, Lacquer artist
