= Nishitagawa District =

Former district in Yamagata prefecture, Japan

Nishitagawa (西田川郡, Nishitagawa-gun) was a district located in Yamagata, Japan.

As of 2003, the district had an estimated population of 9,921 and a density of 38.84 persons per km^{2}. The total area is 255.40 km^{2}.

The district dissolved when Atsumi become part of the new city of Tsuruoka on October 1, 2005.

== Towns and villages ==
- Atsumi
