= Japan National Route 112 =

Road in Yamagata Prefecture, Japan

National Route 112
- 国道112号
- Japan National Route 112 highlighted in red

Route information
- Length: 139.2 km (86.5 mi)
- Existed: 1953–present

Major junctions
- South end: National Route 13 / National Route 48 in Yamagata
- North end: National Route 7 in Sakata

Location
- Country: Japan

Highway system
- National highways of Japan; Expressways of Japan
← National Route 108	→ National Route 113

National Route 112 (国道112号, Kokudō Hyaku jūnigō) is a national highway of Japan that traverses the prefecture of Yamagata in a southeast–northwest routing. It connects the prefecture's capital city, Yamagata in eastern Yamagata Prefecture to the city of Sakata on the prefecture's western coast. It has a total length of 139.2 kilometers (86.5 mi).

== Route description ==
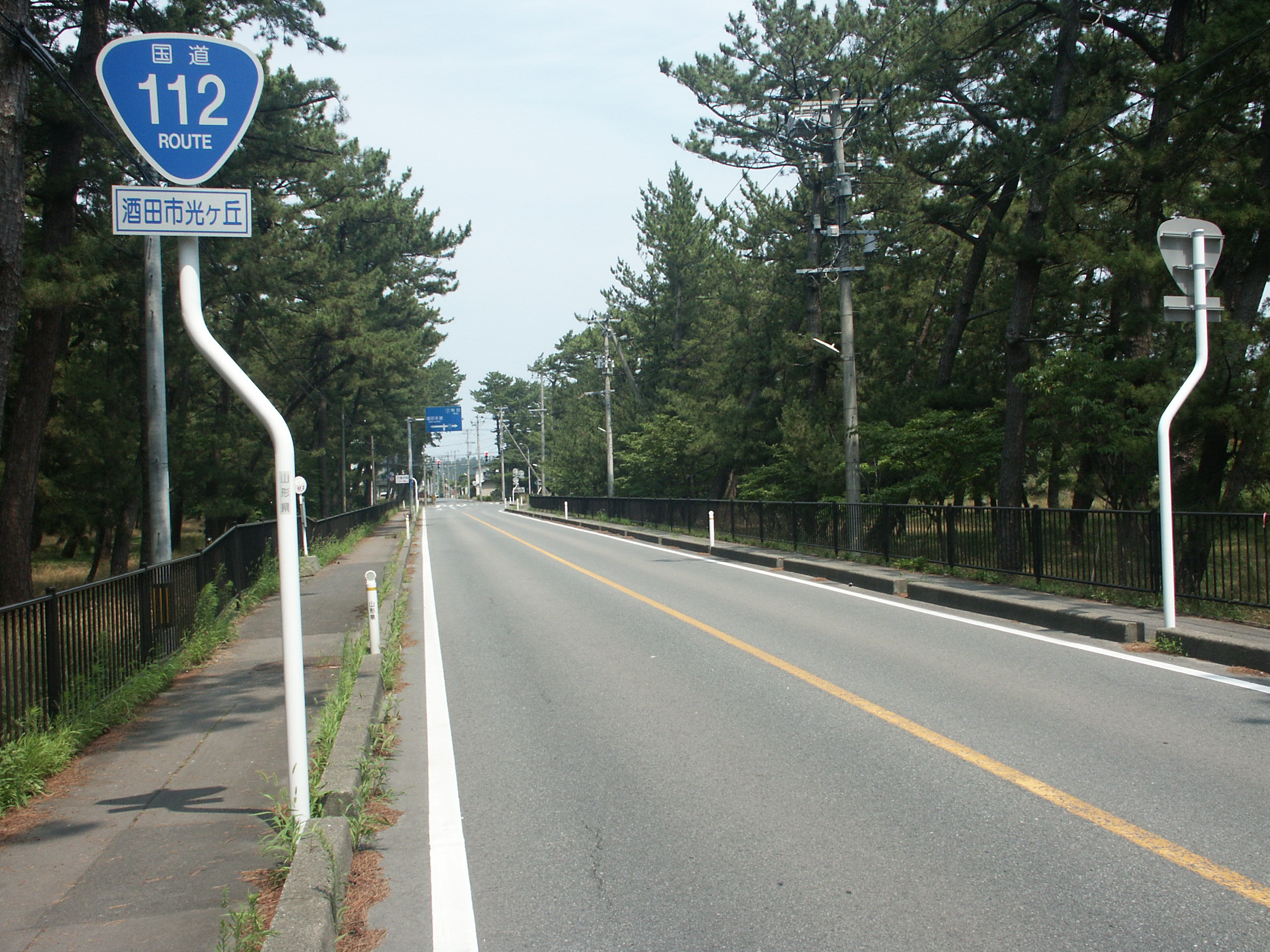
National Route 112 in Sakata

National Route 112 begins at a junction with National Route 13 and National Route 48 in Yamagata Prefecture's capital city, Yamagata in the eastern part of the prefecture. The highway passes through Yamagata's city center. A part of this National Route 112 in central Yamagata is closed to auto traffic during the annual Yamagata Hanagasa Festival and is utilized as a part of the primary venue for the festival. After passing through the capital city's central district, the highway curves to the northwest, passing through the town of Nakayama on the way to the city of Sagae. The highway bypasses the city's central district, traveling along the eastern and northern edge of the city. On the western fringe of Sagae the highway shares a brief concurrency with National Route 458. In the city of Tsuruoka, the highway shares concurrencies with National Route 345 and then National Route 7. After passing through the central district of Sakata, the highway ends at a junction with National Route 7 on the northern side of the city. National Route 112 has a total length of 139.2 kilometers (86.5 mi).

== History ==
National Route 112 was established by the Cabinet of Japan on 18 May 1954 as Secondary National Route 112 between the cities of Yamagata and Tsuruoka. The highway was reclassified as General National Route 112 on 1 April 1965. On 1 April 1993, the highway's ending point was shifted from Tsuruoka to Sakata following an order from the Cabinet of Japan.

== Major junctions ==
The route lies entirely within Yamagata Prefecture.

Location	km	mi	Destinations	Notes
Yamagata	0.0	0.0	National Route 13 / National Route 48 east (Yamagata Bypass) – to Yamagata Expressway, Shinjō, Tendō, Yonezawa, Nan'yō; Yamagata Prefecture Route 267 south – Zao Onsen	Southern terminus; roadway continues south as Yamagata Prefecture Route 267; interchange
Yamagata	2.4	1.5	National Route 286 east – to Yamagata Expressway, Sendai, Yamagata Prefecture Office; National Route 348 west – to Tōhoku-Chūō Expressway, Tsuruoka, Nagai	
Yamagata	3.1	1.9	Yamagata Prefecture Route 17 west	
Yamagata	3.6	2.2	Yamagata Prefecture Route 16 – to National Route 13, Yamagata Station, Yamagata Prefecture Office	
Yamagata	4.6	2.9	Yamagata Prefecture Route 19 north	
Yamagata	4.8	3.0	Yamagata Prefecture Route 18 south	
Yamagata	5.1	3.2	Yamagata Prefecture Route 22 north – Tendō; Yamagata Prefecture Route 49 east – Kojirakawa	Southern end of Yamagata Prefecture Route 49 concurrency
Yamagata	6.5	4.0	Yamagata Prefecture Route 49 west – to Tōhoku-Chūō Expressway, Tsuruoka, Sagae	Northern end of Yamagata Prefecture Route 49 concurrency
Yamagata	9.0	5.6	Yamagata Prefecture Route 49 east – to Tōhoku-Chūō Expressway, Sendai, Yonezawa; Yamagata Prefecture Route 20 north – Higashine, Tendō	Southern end of Yamagata Prefecture Route 49 concurrency
Yamagata	9.4	5.8	Yamagata Prefecture Route 49 west – Yamanobe	Northern end of Yamagata Prefecture Route 49 concurrency
Yamagata	10.4	6.5	Yamagata Prefecture Route 174 east – Dainome	
Yamagata	12.8	8.0	Yamagata Prefecture Route 275 east – to National Route 13, Tendō, Driver's License Center	
Nakayama	14.1	8.8	Yamagata Prefecture Route 168 south – Yamanobe; Yamagata Prefecture Route 277 north – Darumaji	
Nakayama	16.0	9.9	Yamagata Prefecture Route 24 east – Central Nakayama; Yamagata Prefecture Route 105 south – Yamanobe	Southern end of Yamagata Prefecture Route 24 concurrency
Nakayama	16.8	10.4	Yamagata Prefecture Route 178 west – Nakayama Museum of Local History	
Nakayama	17.2	10.7	Yamagata Prefecture Route 24 west – Ōe, Asahi; Yamagata Prefecture Route 277 east – Tendō	Northern end of Yamagata Prefecture Route 24 concurrency
Sagae	17.9	11.1	Yamagata Prefecture Route 282 north – Central Sagae	
Sagae	19.8	12.3	Yamagata Expressway – to Tōhoku-Chūō Expressway, Sendai, Fukushima, Sakata, Tsuruoka	Sagae Interchange (E48 exit 7)
Sagae	20.5	12.7	Yamagata Prefecture Route 144 west – Sagae Station	
Sagae	21.3	13.2	Yamagata Prefecture Routes 23 / 282 – Sagae Station, Tendō	
Sagae	24.3	15.1	Yamagata Prefecture Route 25 – Sagae Station, Kahoku	
Sagae	26.5	16.5	Yamagata Prefecture Route 26 east – Central Sagae	Southern end of Yamagata Prefecture Route 26 concurrency
Sagae	27.0	16.8	National Route 287 / National Route 347 east – Higashine, Kahoku, Jionji Temple, Nagai, Asahi, Ōe	Interchange
Sagae	27.7	17.2	Yamagata Prefecture Route 26 west – Shiraiwa	Northern end of Yamagata Prefecture Route 26 concurrency
Sagae	28.7	17.8	Yamagata Prefecture Route 379 – Ōe, Shiraiwa	
Sagae	30.7	19.1	Yamagata Prefecture Route 26 east – Shiraiwa	Southern end of Yamagata Prefecture Route 26 concurrency
Sagae	31.6	19.6	National Route 458 south / Yamagata Prefecture Route 26 west – Nagai, Ōe	Southern end of National Route 458 concurrency, northern end of Yamagata Prefecture Route 26 concurrency
Sagae	32.4	20.1	National Route 458 north – Ōkura, Sachu	Northern end of National Route 458 concurrency
Nishikawa	35.3	21.9	Yamagata Prefecture Route 291 south – Kaishu, Yoshikawa	
Nishikawa	36.0	22.4	Yamagata Expressway – Sendai, Fukushima, Sakata, Tsuruoka	Nishikawa Interchange (E48 exit 8)
Nishikawa	38.4	23.9	Yamagata Prefecture Route 26 east / 54 south – Mazawa	
Nishikawa	40.3	25.0	Yamagata Prefecture Route 292 north – Iwanezawa	
Nishikawa	53.0	32.9	Yamagata Expressway east – Sendai, Fukushima	Gassan Interchange (E48 exit 9)
Tsuruoka	63.0	39.1	Mount Yudono Toll Road east – Mount Yudono	Interchange
Tsuruoka	73.2	45.5	Yamagata Expressway west – Sakata	Yudonosan Interchange (E48 exit 10); northbound exit, southbound entrance
Tsuruoka	77.8	48.3	Yamagata Prefecture Route 351 north – Ōami	
Tsuruoka	83.9	52.1	Yamagata Prefecture Route 44 – to Yamagata Expressway, Otori, Arasawa Dam, Fujishima, Haguro	
Tsuruoka	87.1	54.1	Yamagata Prefecture Route 349 south – to Yamagata Expressway	Southern end of Yamagata Prefecture Route 349 concurrency
Tsuruoka	87.7	54.5	Yamagata Prefecture Route 349 north	Northern end of Yamagata Prefecture Route 349 concurrency
Tsuruoka	89.1	55.4	Yamagata Prefecture Route 349 – Mount Kinbo, Shoryuji, Kawarada	
Tsuruoka	94.6	58.8	Yamagata Prefecture Route 350 north – Central Tsuruoka	
Tsuruoka	94.9	59.0	National Route 345 south (Tsuruoka-minami Bypass) – to National Route 7, Niigata, Central Tsuruoka	Southern end of National Route 345 concurrency
Tsuruoka	95.6	59.4	Yamagata Prefecture Route 350 south – Kurokawa	
Tsuruoka	97.2	60.4	Yamagata Prefecture Route 47 – Central Tsuruoka, Mount Haguro	
Tsuruoka	99.0	61.5	National Route 345 north – to National Route 47, Shinjō; Yamagata Prefecture Route 349 south – to National Route 7, Niigata, Central Tsuruoka	Northern end of National Route 345 concurrency
Tsuruoka	100.4	62.4	Yamagata Prefecture Route 350 – Central Tsuruoka, Mikawa	
Tsuruoka	102.4	63.6	National Route 7 north (Mikawa Bypass) – to Shonai Airport, Akita, Sakata; Yamagata Prefecture Route 350 south (Tsuruoka Bypass) – Takarada, Hodashi	Southern end of National Route 7 concurrency
Tsuruoka	103.7	64.4	Yamagata Prefecture Route 332 – Yunohama, Central Tsuruoka	
Tsuruoka	105.9	65.8	National Route 7 south (Tsuruoka Bypass) – to Nihonkai-Tōhoku Expressway, Yamagata Expressway, Niigata, Murakami; Yamagata Prefecture Route 47 east – Mount Haguro, Tsuruoka City Office	Northern end of National Route 7 concurrency
Tsuruoka	109.1	67.8	Yamagata Prefecture Route 38 north / 50 east – to Shonai Airport, Sakata, Yunohama; Yamagata Prefecture Route 338 south – to National Route 7, Yutagawa	Southern end of concurrency with Yamagata Prefecture Routes 38 and 50
Tsuruoka	109.8	68.2	Yamagata Prefecture Route 38 south – Mizusawa	Northern end of Yamagata Prefecture Route 38 concurrency
Tsuruoka	110.6	68.7	Yamagata Prefecture Route 336 west – to National Route 7, Niigata	
Tsuruoka	113.3	70.4	Yamagata Prefecture Route 43 ends Yamagata Prefecture Route 50 west – Kamo Port, Yura	Southern end of Yamagata Prefecture Route 43 concurrency, northern end of Yamagata Prefecture Route 50 concurrency
Tsuruoka	117.8	73.2	Yamagata Prefecture Route 43 east – Mikawa, Oyama	Northern end of Yamagata Prefecture Route 43 concurrency
Sakata	121.8	75.7	Yamagata Prefecture Route 118 east – to Nihonkai-Tōhoku Expressway, National Route 7, Shonai Airport, Mikawa	
Sakata	122.6	76.2	Yamagata Prefecture Route 357 east – to National Route 7, Mikawa	
Sakata	131.6	81.8	Yamagata Prefecture Route 355 – Miyanoura, Ken Domon Museum of Photography, Tohoku University of Community Service and Science	
Sakata	133.4	82.9	Yamagata Prefecture Route 353 – to Nihonkai-Tōhoku Expressway, National Route 7, Sakata Station, Yurihonjō	
Sakata	134.1	83.3	Yamagata Prefecture Route 42 – Sakata Port, Matsuyama	
Sakata	134.9	83.8	Yamagata Prefecture Route 41 east – Sakata Station	
Sakata	135.3	84.1	Yamagata Prefecture Route 353 south	Southern end of Yamagata Prefecture Route 353 concurrency
Sakata	136.2	84.6	Yamagata Prefecture Route 353 north	Northern end of Yamagata Prefecture Route 353 concurrency
Sakata	139.2	86.5	National Route 7 (Sakata Bypass) – to Nihonkai-Tōhoku Expressway, Niigata, Tsuruoka, Akita, Yurihonjō	Northern terminus
1.000 mi = 1.609 km; 1.000 km = 0.621 mi: Concurrency terminus; Incomplete access; Route transition
