= Akita Expressway =

Expressway in Iwate and Akita prefectures in Japan

Akita Expressway

- 秋田自動車道

Route information
- Length: 229.2 km (142.4 mi) Akita Sotokanjō Expressway: 9.5 km (5.9 mi); Kotooka Noshiro Road: 33.8 km (21.0 mi)
- Existed: 1991–present
- Component highways: National Route 7 Akita Expressway; Akita Expressway

Major junctions
- South end: Kitakami Junction in Kitakami, Iwate (39.2746°N 141.0747°E) Tōhoku Expressway
- Yuzawa-Yokote Road Nihonkai-Tōhoku Expressway
- North end: Kosaka Junction in Kosaka, Akita (40.3714°N 140.7133°E) Tōhoku Expressway

Location
- Country: Japan
- Major cities: Yokote, Daisen, Akita, Noshiro, Ōdate

Highway system
- National highways of Japan; Expressways of Japan

The Akita Expressway (秋田自動車道, Akita Jidōsha-dō) is a national expressway in the Tōhoku region of Japan. The 229.2-kilometer-long (142.4 mi) expressway begins at an interchange with the Tōhoku Expressway in Kitakami, Iwate from where it proceeds northwest towards the capital of Akita Prefecture, Akita. From there, it travels northeast back to another interchange along the Tōhoku Expressway in the town of Kosaka. It is jointly owned and operated by East Nippon Expressway Company and the Ministry of Land, Infrastructure, Transport and Tourism (MLIT). The Akita Expressway is numbered E7 between Kosaka and Kitakami Junctions and E46 between Kitakami and Kawabe Junctions under the MLIT's "2016 Proposal for Realization of Expressway Numbering."

== Route description ==
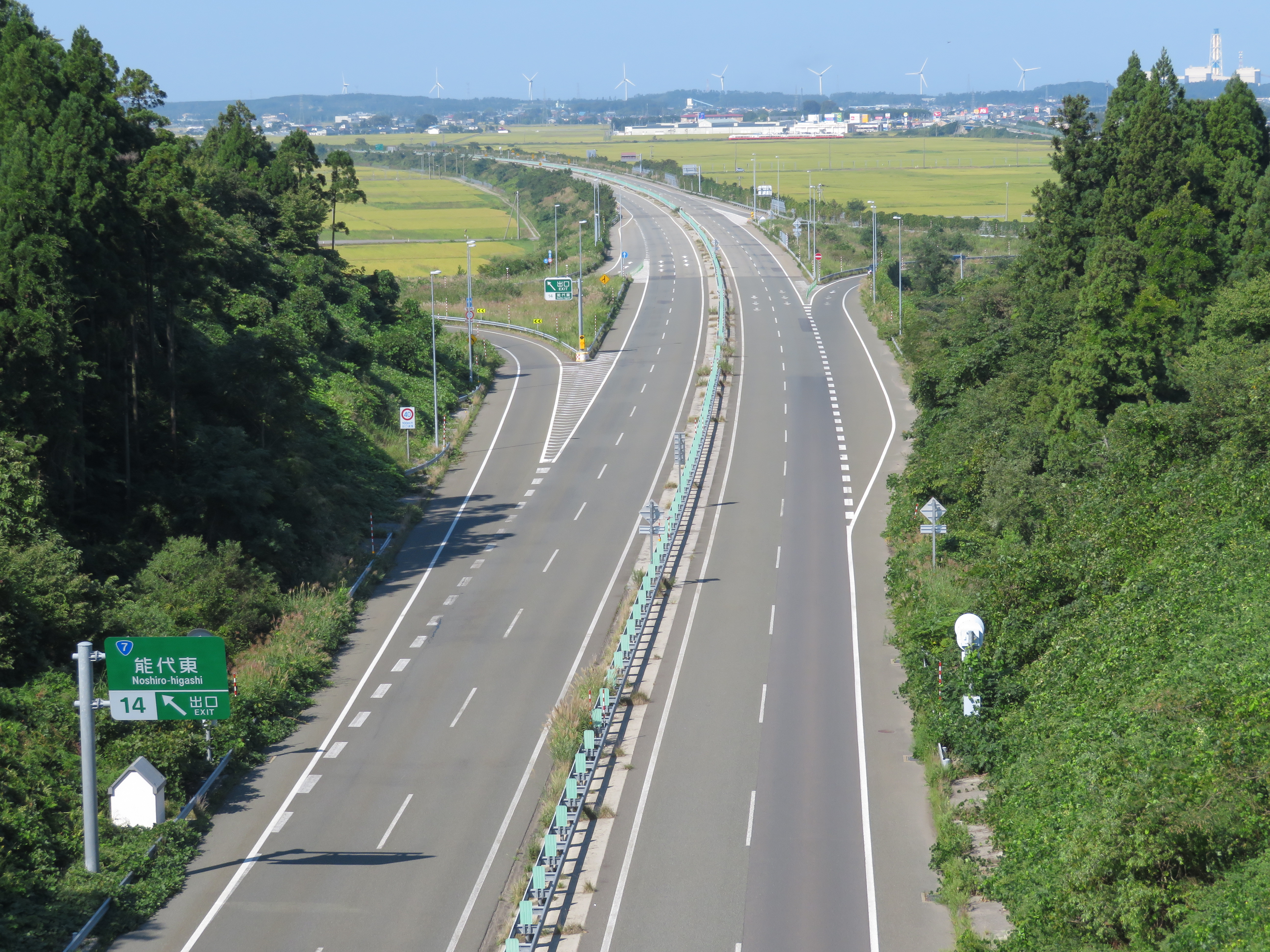
The Akita Expressway in Noshiro, Akita

The expressway begins at a junction with the Tōhoku Expressway in Iwate Prefecture and crosses into Akita Prefecture to the west. The route intersects the Tōhoku-Chūō Expressway in Yokote and the Nihonkai-Tōhoku Expressway in the Akita city area. From this junction, the route follows a northerly course parallel to the Sea of Japan to National Route 7 in Noshiro where the expressway meets a gap in its routing. The expressway resumes its course, heading northeast towards the Tōhoku Expressway near Odate–Noshiro Airport in Kitaakita. The Akita Expressway ends at a junction with the Tōhoku Expressway in the town of Kosaka.

The sections between Hachiryū and Futatsui-Shirakami interchanges and Kanisawa Interchange and Kosaka Junction are toll-free; all other sections assess tolls based on distance traveled in the same manner as most other national expressways.

The expressway was the first highway of its kind to employ a snow-melting system that stores heat in the expressway's embankments during the summer. The system is in place in Daisen outside of the Kyowa Tunnel. The heat is then released during heavy snowfall events to clear snow off the expressway.

=== Official designations ===
The entire route is signed as the Akita Expressway for consistency purposes, however two separate sections of the route are officially designated as the Akita Sotokanjō Expressway and Kotooka Noshiro Road (both bypasses of National Route 7). These sections are not classified as national expressways but rather as national highways for motor vehicles only with national expressway concurrency (高速自動車国道に並行する一般国道自動車専用道路, Kōsoku Jidōsha Kokudō ni Heikōsuru Ippan Kokudō Jidōsha Senyō Dōro).

- Kitakami JCT - Akita-kita IC : Tōhoku Ōdan Expressway Kamaishi Akita Route
- Akita-kita IC - Shōwa-Ogahantō IC : Akita Sotokanjō Expressway
- Shōwa-Ogahantō IC - Kotooka-Moritake IC : Nihonkai Tōhoku Engan Expressway
- Kotooka-Moritake IC - Futatsui-Shirakami IC : Kotooka Noshiro Road

== History ==
Planning for an expressway between the cities of Kitakami and Akita began in 1982. The first section of this expressway was opened on 25 July 1991 after nine years of planning and construction that cost 1.158 trillion yen (about 1 billion US dollars). It was a 52.1-kilometer-long (32.4 mi) section of highway that linked Akita to Yokote. By 1994 the expressway was linked to the Tōhoku Expressway in Kitakami following the opening of Kitakami Junction. The next major connection to the expressway was its linkage to the Nihonkai-Tōhoku Expressway at Kawabe Junction in Akita on 23 July 1997.

An experiment was conducted by MLIT to determine what the effects of lifting tolls along the expressway north of the city of Akita would be. Immediately following the 2011 Tōhoku earthquake and tsunami, the experiment was suspended to raise funds for the repairs of expressways in the Tōhoku region. By August 2011 the expressway had been extended in various stages all the way north from the city of Akita to Futatsui-Shirakami Interchange in Noshiro. In August 2011, following the toll-lifting experiment it was decided by MLIT that much of the aforementioned segment of the expressway, as well as any future segments built along the planned route, would be toll-free. On 30 November 2013, the expressway was linked to its northern terminus in Kosaka along the Tōhoku Expressway following the opening of a 16.1-kilometer (10.0 mi) section of highway. On 13 December 2020, a 5.3-kilometer (3.3 mi) section of the expressway opened in Kitaakita, extending the northern section of the expressway closer to the southern section.

== Future ==
As of December 2020, the entirety of the Akita Expressway is open to traffic except for a section linking the cities of Noshiro and Kitaakita in northern Akita Prefecture. A section of this gap in the route is set to be completed by 2023, however there is no date scheduled for the total completion of the expressway.

== List of interchanges and features ==
- SA - service area, PA - parking area, TB - toll gate

| Prefecture | Location | km | mi | Exit | Name | Destinations | Notes |
|---|---|---|---|---|---|---|---|
| Iwate | Kitakami | 0.0 | 0.0 | – | Kitakami | Tōhoku Expressway – to Kamaishi Expressway, Morioka, Aomori, Sendai, Fukushima | Southern terminus of the Akita Expressway; E4 exit 37; E46 continues north along the Tōhoku Expressway |
| Iwate | Kitakami | 8.7 | 5.4 | 1 | Kitakami-nishi | Iwate Prefecture Route 47 west (Kitakami-nishi Inter Route) – Yokote, Geto; Iwate Prefecture Route 225 east (Kitakami Waga Route) – Central Kitakami, Ōfunato | |
| Iwate | Kitakami–Nishiwaga border | 14.1 17.8 | 8.8 11.1 | Waga-Sennin Tunnel | | | |
| Iwate | Nishiwaga | 21.4 | 13.3 | SA | Kinshūko | | |
| Iwate | Nishiwaga | 30.3 | 18.8 | 2 | Yuda | National Route 107 – Central Yuda, Kitakami, Yokote, Akita | |
| Akita | Yokote | 37.5 39.9 | 23.3 24.8 | Sannai Tunnel | | | |
| Akita | Yokote | 41.0 | 25.5 | PA | Sannai | | |
| Akita | Yokote | 50.6 | 31.4 | 3 | Yokote | Tōhoku-Chūō Expressway north – Yuzawa, Yamagata, Fukushima | junction and interchange |
| Akita | Yokote | 57.1 | 35.5 | 3-1 | Yokote-kita | Akita Prefecture Route 29 – to National Route 13, Central Yokote, Yurihonjō | Smart interchange |
| Akita | Yokote–Daisen border | 66.5– 67.0 | 41.3– 41.6 | First Omonogawa Bridge over the Omono River | | | |
| Akita | Yokote–Daisen border | 68.9 | 42.8 | PA | Ōmori | | |
| Akita | Daisen | 71.5 | 44.4 | 4 | Ōmagari | National Route 105 – Agriculture Science Museum; National Route 105 east (Ōmagari-Nishi Road) – to National Route 13, Central Ōmagari, Kakunodate, Yokote | |
| Akita | Daisen | 87.8 | 54.6 | 4-1 / SA | Nishisenboku | Unnamed city-maintained roads | Smart interchange is built into the service area |
| Akita | Daisen | 90.1– 90.5 | 56.0– 56.2 | Second Omonogawa Bridge over the Omono River | | | |
| Akita | Daisen | 95.4 | 59.3 | 5 | Kyōwa | National Route 341 – Akita Airport, Morioka, Akita, Yokote, Kakunodate | |
| Akita | Akita | 103.8 | 64.5 | 5-1 | Kawabe | Nihonkai-Tōhoku Expressway south – Yurihonjō, Sakata | Northern terminus of E46; Akita Expressway continues north as E7 |
| Akita | Akita | 106.7 | 66.3 | 6 | Akita-minami | National Route 13 – Central Akita, Kawabe | |
| Akita | Akita | 113.7 | 70.6 | 7 | Akita-chūō | Akita Prefecture Route 62 (Akita Kitanoda Route) – Central Akita, Kawabe, Taihei | |
| Akita | Akita | 117.9 | 73.3 | PA | Taiheizan | | |
| Akita | Akita | 122.9 | 76.4 | 8 | Akita-kita | Akita Prefecture Route 72 south (Akita Inter Route) – Akita Station, Akita Port | |
| Akita | Akita | 132.4 | 82.3 | 9 | Shōwa-Ogahantō | National Route 7 / National Route 101 south – Central Akita, Yurihonjō, Ōdate, Noshiro; National Route 101 north – Oga Quasi-National Park, Tennō | |
| Akita | Gojōme | 143.5 | 89.2 | 10 | Gojōme-Hachirōgata | Akita Prefecture Route 15 (Akita Hachirōgata Route) – to National Route 7, National Route 285, Ōdate, Kitaakita, Akita, Noshiro | |
| Akita | Mitane | 150.4 | 93.5 | SA | Hachirōko | | |
| Akita | Mitane | 153.1 | 95.1 | 11 / TB | Kotooka-Moritake | Akita Prefecture Route 37 (Kotooka Kamikoani Route) – to National Route 7, Oga, Kamikoani | The toll gate at Kotooka-Moritake marks the northern end of the tolled section of the Akita Expressway |
| Akita | Mitane | 166.1 | 103.2 | 12 | Hachiryū | National Route 7 – Akita, Noshiro | |
| Akita | Noshiro | 170.2 | 105.8 | 13 | Noshiro-minami | National Route 7 – Akita, Ōdate, Kitaakita | |
| Akita | Noshiro | 176.7 | 109.8 | 14 | Noshiro-higashi | National Route 7 – Yurihonjō, Akita, Ōdate, Kitaakita; Akita Prefecture Route 64 east (Noshiro Futatsui Route) – Happō | |
| Akita | Noshiro | 186.7 | 116.0 | 15 | Futatsui-Shirakami | National Route 7 – Akita, Ōdate, Kitaakita, Shirakami-Sanchi; Akita Prefecture Route 317 east (Nishimeya Futatsui Route) – Futatsui | At grade junction |
| Akita | Gap in the expressway, connection is made by National Route 7 and Akita Prefecture Route 325 | | | | | | |
| Akita | Kitaakita | 198.5 | 123.3 | 21 | Kanisawa | Akita Prefecture Route 325 east (Ōdate–Noshiro Airport West Route) – Kanisawa | |
| Akita | Kitaakita | 200.2 | 124.4 | 22 | Isedōtai | Akita Prefecture Route 197 (Kidoishi–Takanosu Route) – Kidoishi, Isedōtai Ruins | |
| Akita | Kitaakita | 203.8 | 126.6 | 23 | Ōdate-Noshiro Airport | Akita Prefecture Route 324 (Ōdate-Noshiro Airport East Route) – to National Route 285, Kazuno, Hinai; Akita Prefecture Route 325 (Ōdate-Noshiro Airport West Route) – to National Route 7, Noshiro, Futatsui | |
| Akita | Kitaakita | 205.5 | 127.7 | 24 | Takanosu | National Route 105 (Takanosu Bypass) – to National Route 7, Central Takanosu, Ōdate, Akita, Kakunodate | |
| Akita | Kitaakita–Ōdate border | 208.7 211.0 | 129.7 131.1 | Matoyama Tunnel | | | |
| Akita | Ōdate | 217.7 | 135.3 | 25 | Niida-Manaka | Akita Prefecture Route 52 (Hinai Tashiro Route) – to National Route 7, National Route 285, Ōdate, Hayaguchi, Hinai, Ōdate Industrial Area | |
| Akita | Ōdate | 220.3 | 136.9 | 26 | Ōdate-minami | National Route 103 (Ōdate-Minami Bypass) – Towada, Kazuno, Ōdate, Noshiro, Kitaakita | |
| Akita | Ōdate | 224.9 | 139.7 | 27 | Ōdate-kita | National Route 7 – Central Ōdate, Hirosaki, Hirakawa | |
| Akita | Ōdate | 226.5 | 140.7 | PA | Shakanai | | |
| Akita | Ōdate | 229.7– 231.5 | 142.7– 143.8 | Ōshigenai Daiichi Tunnel | | | |
| Akita | Ōdate | 231.7– 234.7 | 144.0– 145.8 | Ōshigenai Daini Tunnel | | | |
| Akita | Ōdate | 235.2– 237.7 | 146.1– 147.7 | Yukisawa Daiichi Tunnel | | | |
| Akita | Ōdate–Kosaka border | 237.9 239.7 | 147.8 148.9 | Yukisawa Daini Tunnel | | | |
| Akita | Kosaka | 240.5 | 149.4 | 28 / TB | Kosaka-kita | Unnamed municipal-maintained road – Kosaka | Northern end of free section; Kosaka-bound exit, Ōdate-bound entrance only |
| Akita | Kosaka | 241.0 | 149.8 | – | Kosaka | Tōhoku Expressway – Aomori, Morioka, Sendai | Northern terminus; E4 exit 49-2 |
1.000 mi = 1.609 km; 1.000 km = 0.621 mi: Electronic toll collection; Incomplete access; Route transition; Unopened
