= Japan National Route 48 =

National highway in Japan

National Route 48
- 国道48号
- Japan National Route 48 highlighted in red

Route information
- Length: 75.0 km (46.6 mi)
- Existed: 1963–present
- History: Formerly National Route 110 from 1953-1963

Major junctions
- East end: National Route 45 / National Route 346 in Aoba-ku, Sendai
- National Route 286; Tōhoku Expressway; National Route 457; National Route 13; Yamagata Expressway; National Route 286
- West end: National Route 13 / National Route 112 in Yamagata

Location
- Country: Japan

Highway system
- National highways of Japan; Expressways of Japan
← National Route 47	→ National Route 49

National Route 48 (国道48号, Kokudō yonjūhachigō) is a national highway of Japan that connects the capital cities of Miyagi Prefecture and Yamagata Prefecture, Sendai and Yamagata. It has a total length of 75.0 kilometers (46.6 mi).

== Route description ==
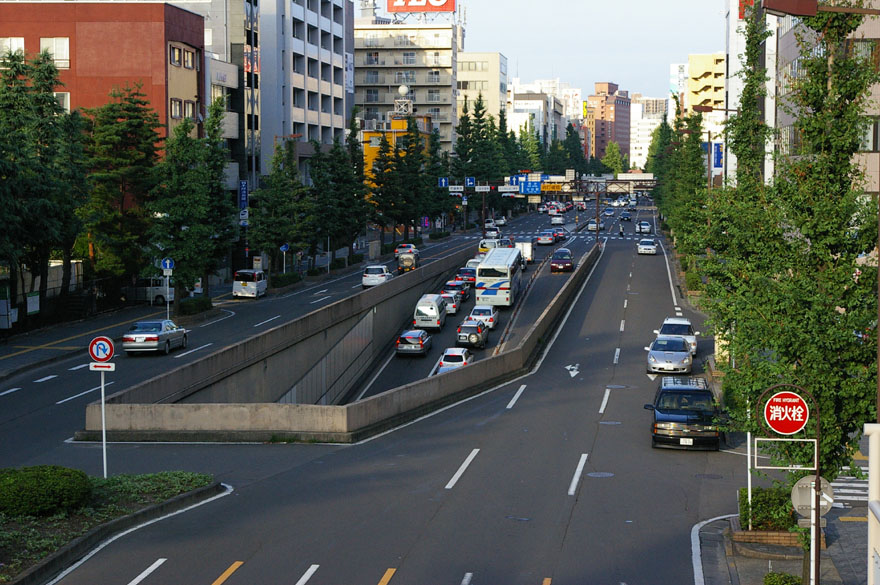
The eastern entrance to the Sendai Nishi Road

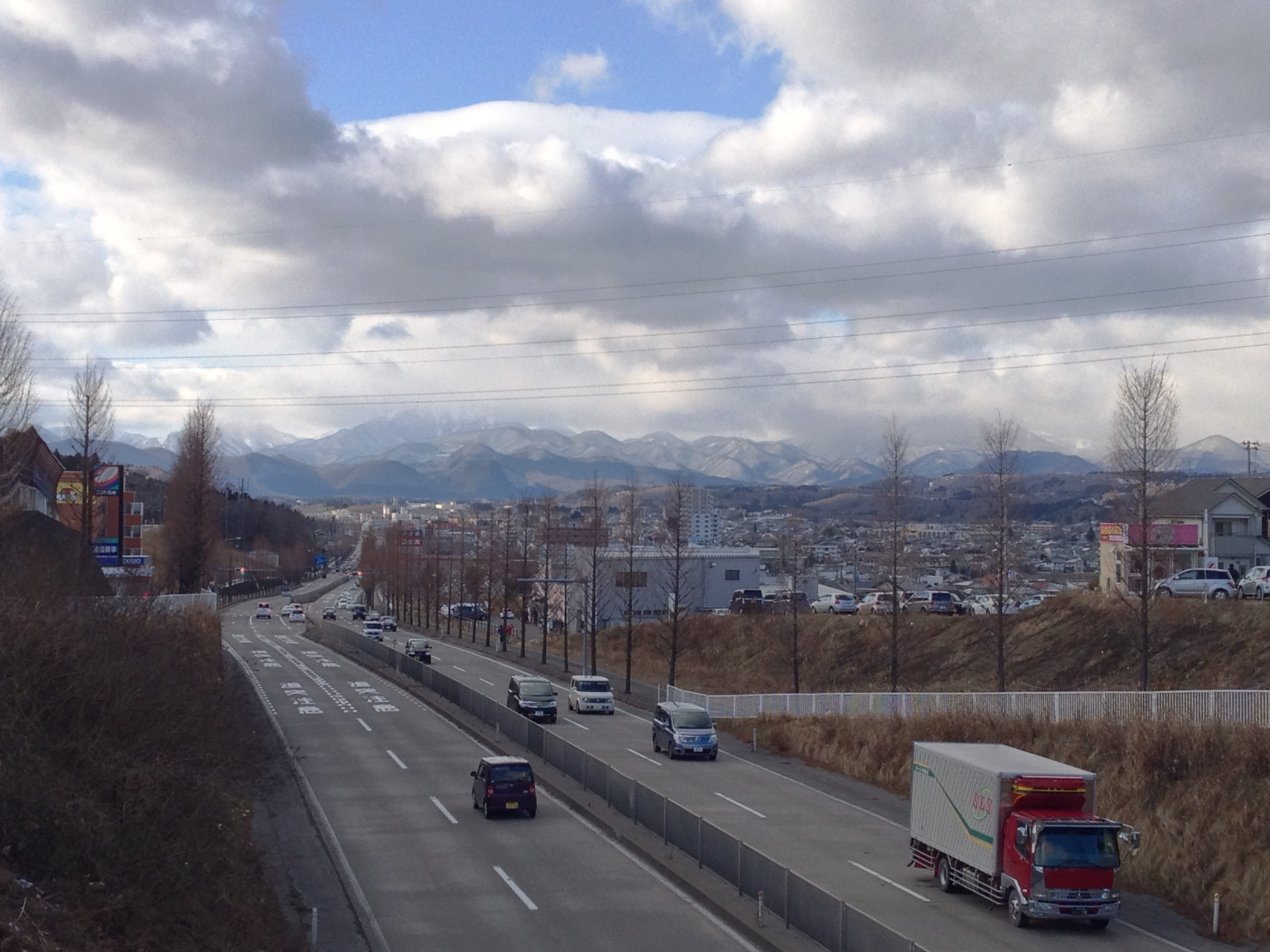
The Ayashi Bypass section of the highway in Sendai looking west towards the Ōu Mountains

National Route 48 is one of the primary east-west highways in the prefectures of Miyagi and Yamagata and is the main toll-free route between the city of Sendai on the Pacific coast and the city of Yamagata in Yamagata Prefecture's interior plains. It carries traffic across the Ōu Mountains that separate the two cities. The highway's eastern terminus lies at a junction with National Route 45 in Sendai's Aoba ward. Its first stretch is a brief concurrency with National Route 286. Leaving National Route 286 and central Sendai, a 5.4-kilometer-long (3.4 mi) section of the highway, the Sendai Nishi Road, is a limited-access road that connects central Sendai to the cross-country Tōhoku Expressway via 3.13 kilometers (3,130 m) of tunnels. Continuing west from the highway's junction with the Tōhoku Expressway, the highway is known as the Ayashi Bypass. The highway meets National Route 457, which is shares a brief concurrency with before that route continues to the south. Crossing into Yamagata Prefecture the highway shares a significant concurrency with National Route 13 in the Yamagata cities of Tendō and Yamagata. The highway while running concurrently with National Route 13, meets its western terminus at a junction with National Route 112 to the south of central Yamagata. The highway has a total length of 75.0 kilometers (46.6 mi).

== History ==
National Route 48 was first established as Secondary National Route 110 in 1953 between the cities of Sendai and Yamagata. It was upgraded to National Route 48 in 1963 and National Route 110 was abolished. The Sendai Nishi Road, billed as the "Land Gateway to Sendai", that links central Sendai to Sendai-Miyagi Interchange on the Tōhoku Expressway was partially opened in 1983 and fully opened in 1987 after construction was completed on a series of tunnels. It replaced the original, congested two-lane section of National Route 48 along the Hirose River. The road along the river was redesignated as Miyagi Prefecture Route 31 after the completion of the Sendai Nishi Road. The Ayashi Bypass to the west of the Sendai Nishi Road along the route was opened in 1994.

== Major intersections ==
All junctions listed are at-grade intersections unless noted otherwise.

Prefecture	Location	km	mi	Destinations	Notes
Miyagi	Sendai	0.0	0.0	National Route 45 north (Jōzenji-dōri) / National Route 346 north – Matsushima; Miyagi Prefecture Route 22 north (Kōtodai-dōri) – Yamagata, Morioka	Eastern terminus; eastern end of National Route 286 concurrency
Miyagi	Sendai	0.4	0.25	National Route 286 east (Higashi-Nibanchō-dōri) – Fukushima, Shiroishi	Western end of National Route 286 concurrency
Miyagi	Sendai	5.6	3.5	Tōhoku Expressway – to Yamagata Expressway, Fukushima, Morioka, Tokyo, Aomori	Sendai-Miyagi Interchange (E4 exit 28)
Miyagi	Sendai	6.0	3.7	Miyagi Prefecture Route 31 – to National Route 286, Kawasaki, Moniwa, Michinoku Park, Izumi, Kitasendai	Interchange
Miyagi	Sendai	7.9	4.9	Miyagi Prefecture Route 135 north – Rikuzen-Ochiai Station	
Miyagi	Sendai	10.5	6.5	Miyagi Prefecture Route 132 – Ayashi Station, Akiu Onsen, Nishikigaoka	
Miyagi	Sendai	11.5	7.1	National Route 457 north – Ayashi Station	Eastern end of National Route 457 concurrency
Miyagi	Sendai	17.6	10.9	National Route 457 south – Futakuchi Kyōkoku Prefectural Natural Park, Akiu Onsen	Western end of National Route 457 concurrency
Miyagi	Sendai	20.0	12.4	Miyagi Prefecture Route 263 north – Saihō-ji	
Yamagata	Higashine	47.3	29.4	Yamagata Prefecture Route 29 west – to National Route 112, Tsuruoka, Murayama, Higashine Onsen	
Yamagata	Higashine	47.9	29.8	Yamagata Prefecture Route 296 (Fruits Line) west – Central Higashine	
Yamagata	Tendō	49.6	30.8	Yamagata Prefecture Route 297 south – Iwasaki; Yamagata Prefecture Route 298 north – Central Higashine	
Yamagata	Tendō	53.2	33.1	Yamagata Prefecture Route 110 west – Doman; Yamagata Prefecture Route 281 south – Tendokogen	
Yamagata	Tendō	54.5	33.9	Yamagata Prefecture Route 279 south – Yamamoto	
Yamagata	Tendō	55.8	34.7	National Route 13 (Yamagata Bypass) – to Tōhoku-Chūō Expressway, Yonezawa, Yamagata, Shinjō, Higashine	Eastern end of National Route 13 concurrency
Yamagata	See National Route 13				
Yamagata	Yamagata	75.0	46.6	National Route 13 south (Yamagata Bypass) – Yonezawa, Nan'yō; National Route 112 north – Central Yamagata; Yamagata Prefecture Route 267 south – Zao Onsen	Western terminus; interchange; western end of National Route 13 concurrency
1.000 mi = 1.609 km; 1.000 km = 0.621 mi: Concurrency terminus

== Japan National Route 110 ==
National Route 110
- Location: Sendai, Yamagata
- Existed: 18 May 1953–1 April 1963

National Route 110 (国道110号) is a former secondary national highway of Japan that occupied the same route as National Route 48 from Sendai to Yamagata. It existed from 1953 to 1963, when it was redefined as the National Route 48.
