= Yamagata Expressway =

Expressway in Miyagi and Yamagata Prefectures, Japan

Yamagata Expressway
- 山形自動車道

Route information
- Length: 136.6 km (84.9 mi)
- Existed: 1981–present

Major junctions
- From: Murata Junction in Murata, Miyagi; Tōhoku Expressway
- To: Sakata-Minato Interchange in Sakata, Yamagata; Nihonkai Engan Tōhoku Expressway; Yamagata Prefectural Route 59

Location
- Country: Japan
- Major cities: Yamagata, Sagae, Tsuruoka

Highway system
- National highways of Japan; Expressways of Japan

The Yamagata Expressway (山形自動車道, Yamagata Jidōsha-dō) is a national expressway in the Tōhoku region of Japan. It is owned and operated by East Nippon Expressway Company.

== Naming ==
The expressway is officially referred to as the Tōhoku Ōdan Expressway Sakata Route. From Tsuruoka Junction to Sakata-Minato Interchange the expressway is concurrent with the Nihonkai Engan Tōhoku Expressway, which is planned to extend further north to Akita Prefecture and Aomori Prefecture.

== Overview ==
The expressway begins in southern Miyagi Prefecture at a junction with the Tōhoku Expressway and heads west, crossing over into Yamagata Prefecture. The route passes to the north of the Yamagata city area and subsequently meets the Tōhoku-Chūō Expressway. From here the expressway crosses mountainous areas of western Yamagata Prefecture before reaching the city of Tsuruoka near the Japan Sea coastline. The remainder of the expressway follows a northerly course paralleling the coastline to the terminus in the city of Sakata.

The route is incomplete between Gassan Interchange and Yudonosan Interchange which cuts the route into two physically separate sections. Travellers must use National Route 112 to travel between the two interchanges. As of March 2008 there are no plans to make the Yamagata Expressway a single contiguous expressway.

The expressway is 4 lanes from Murata Junction to Yamagata Junction and 2 lanes for all other sections. The speed limit is 80 km/h for the 4-laned section and 70 km/h for the 2-laned sections.

== List of interchanges and features ==
- IC – interchange, SIC – smart interchange, JCT – junction, SA – service area, PA – parking area, BS – bus stop, TN – tunnel, BR – bridge, TB – toll gate

No.	Name	Connections	Dist. from Origin	Dist. from Terminus	Bus Stop	Notes	Location	
(26)	Murata JCT	Tōhoku Expressway	0.0	83.5			Murata	Miyagi
1	Miyagikawasaki IC	National Route 286; Pref. Route 14 (Watari Ōgarawa Kawasaki Route)	10.4	73.1			Kawasaki	Miyagi
PA	Furuseki PA		18.2	65.3			Kawasaki	Miyagi
2	Sasaya IC	National Route 286	22.3	61.2			Kawasaki	Miyagi
TN	Sasaya Tunnel		↓	↑		Murata-bound - 3,411 m Sakata-bound - 3,286m	Kawasaki	Miyagi
TN	Sasaya Tunnel		↓	↑		Murata-bound - 3,411 m Sakata-bound - 3,286m	Yamagata	Yamagata
3	Sekizawa IC	National Route 286	28.1	55.4		Sakata-bound exit, Murata-bound entrance only	Yamagata	Yamagata
4	Yamagatazaō IC/ PA	National Route 286	35.6	47.9			Yamagata	Yamagata
TN	Sakazukiyama Tunnel		↓	↑		Murata-bound - 1,234 m Sakata-bound - 1,244 m	Yamagata	Yamagata
5	Yamagata-kita IC	National Route 13	41.9	41.6			Yamagata	Yamagata
	Emergency Exit		↓	↑		Access for Yamagata Chūō Hospital; Authorized vehicles only	Yamagata	Yamagata
6	Yamagata JCT	Tōhoku-Chūō Expressway	46.6	36.9			Yamagata	Yamagata
BR	Mogamigawa Bridge		↓	↑		Mogami River crossing	Nakayama	Yamagata
7	Sagae IC	National Route 112	53.0	30.5			Sagae	Yamagata
7-1/SA	Sagae SA/ SIC	National Route 458	55.9	27.6	○		Sagae	Yamagata
8	Nishikawa IC	National Route 112	67.0	16.5	○		Nishikawa	Yamagata
TB	Nishikawa Toll Gate		↓	↑			Nishikawa	Yamagata
TN	Kazeakesan Tunnel		↓	↑		Length - 1,923 m	Nishikawa	Yamagata
PA	Gassanko PA		81.3	2.2			Nishikawa	Yamagata
9	Gassan IC	National Route 112	83.5	0.0			Nishikawa	Yamagata
Through to National Route 112 (Gassan Road)
10	Yudonosan IC	National Route 112	0.0	26.3			Tsuruoka	Yamagata
TN	Tamugimata Tunnel		↓	↑		Length - 1,921 m	Tsuruoka	Yamagata
TN	Miguriya Tunnel		↓	↑		Length - 1,463 m	Tsuruoka	Yamagata
BS	Shōnai-Asahi Bus Stop		9.1	17.2	○		Tsuruoka	Yamagata
11	Shōnai-Asahi IC	Pref. Route 44 (Amarume Atsumi Route)	9.9	16.4			Tsuruoka	Yamagata
PA	Kushibiki PA		13.0	13.3			Tsuruoka	Yamagata
12/TB	Tsuruoka IC/ TB	National Route 7	23.8	2.5			Tsuruoka	Yamagata
17	Tsuruoka JCT	Nihonkai-Tōhoku Expressway	26.3	0		Yamagata Expwy ←→ Atsumi: No access	Tsuruoka	Yamagata
Through to Nihonkai-Tōhoku Expressway
