= Japan National Route 7 =

National highway in Japan

National Route 7
- 国道7号

Route information
- Maintained by Ministry of Land, Infrastructure, Transport and Tourism
- Length: 559.6 km (347.7 mi) Distance includes bypasses signed with the same route number
- Existed: 4 December 1952–present

Major junctions
- North end: National Route 4 / National Route 45 in Aomori, Aomori
- National Route 49; National Route 290; National Route 112; National Route 47; National Route 107; National Route 105; National Route 13; National Route 105; National Route 101; National Route 280
- South end: National Route 8 / National Route 17 / National Route 113 / National Route 116 / National Route 289 / National Route 350 / National Route 402 in Niigata, Niigata

Location
- Country: Japan

Highway system
- National highways of Japan; Expressways of Japan
← National Route 6	→ National Route 8

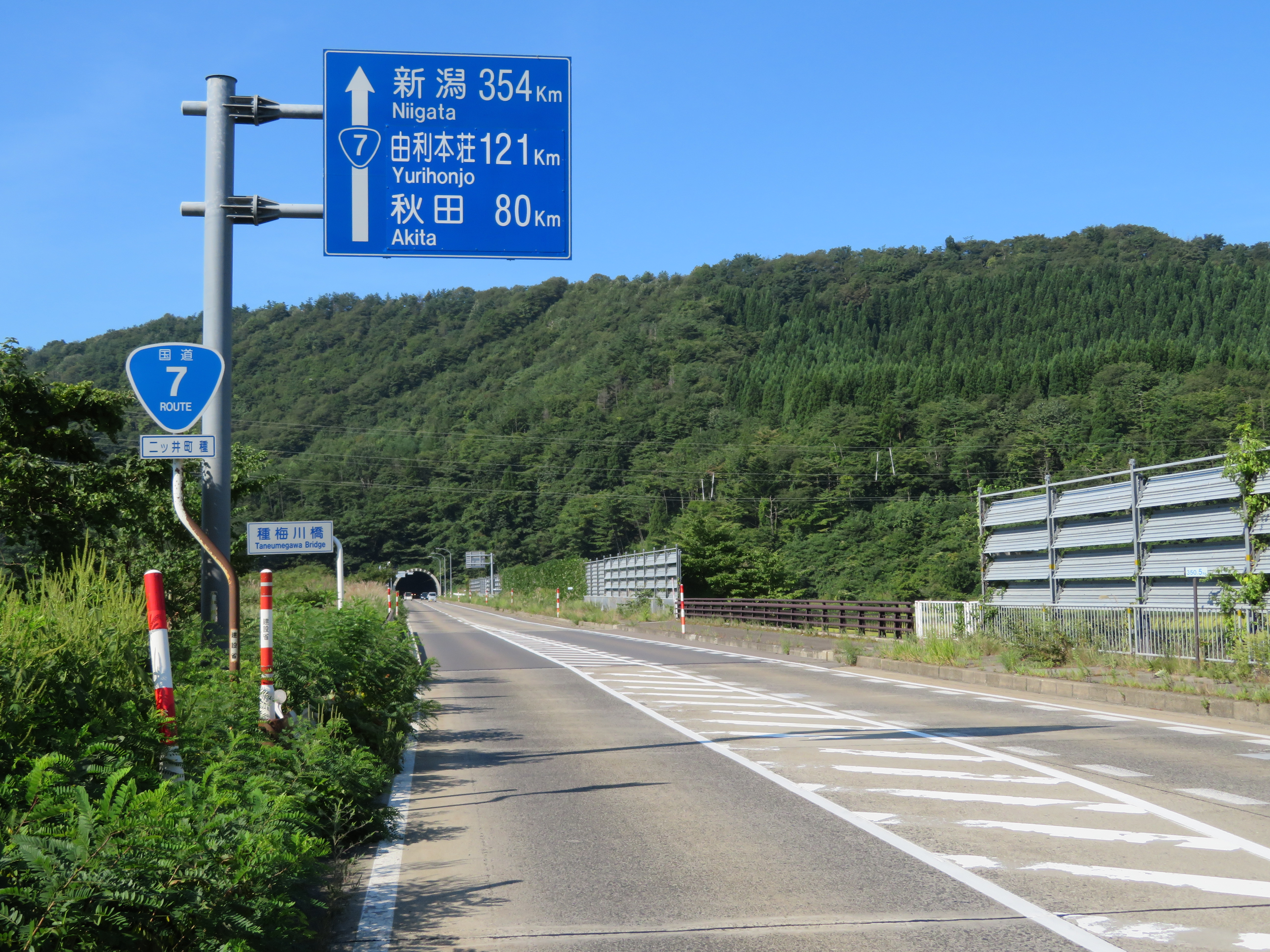
Japan National Route 7 in Noshiro, Akita Prefecture

National Route 7 (国道7号, Kokudō Nana-gō) is a major north-south national highway on the Sea of Japan side of the island of Honshū, Japan. It traverses four prefectures, with Niigata at its southern end, then Yamagata, Akita, and finally, Aomori at its northern end. The 471.8-kilometer (293.2 mi) long highway begins at an intersection with national routes 8, 17, 113, 116, 289, 350, and 402 in the capital of Niigata, Niigata. Travelling north, the highway links the prefectural capitals Akita and Aomori. In central Aomori the highway ends at the northern terminus of National Route 4 and National Route 45.

== Route description ==
The main line of National Route 7 has a length of 471.8 kilometers (293.2 mi). When bypasses signed as National Route 7 are included, its total distance increases to 559.6 kilometers (347.7 mi). The highway's origin and southern terminus lies in Chuo-ku, Niigata at junction with national routes 8, 17, 113, 116, 289, 350, and 402. The highway passes through Shibata, Murakami, Tsuruoka, Sakata, Yurihonjō, Akita, Noshiro, Ōdate, and Hirosaki. Its endpoint and northern terminus lies in Aomori at a junction with national routes 4 and 45.

== History ==
What eventually became National Route 7 between Aburakawa-juku in present-day Aomori and Tsuchizakiminato-juku in Akita was established during the Edo period by Tokugawa Ieyasu as the Ushū Hama Kaidō and Ushū Kaidō, subroutes of the Ōshū Kaidō.

National Route 7 was established by the Cabinet of Japan roughly along the aforementioned section of the Ushū Kaidō as well as a new road south to Niigata on 4 December 1952 as First Class National Highway 7 between Niigata and Aomori. Its designationation was changed to General National Highway 7 on 1 April 1965.

== Major intersections ==
All junctions listed are at-grade intersections unless noted otherwise.

Prefecture	Location	km	mi	Destinations	Notes
Niigata	Niigata	0.0	0.0	National Route 8 south / National Route 17 south / National Route 113 east / National Route 116 south / National Route 289 east / National Route 350 west / National Route 402 south / Niigata Prefecture Route 565 south	Southern terminus; southern end of concurrency with routes 8, 113, and 350
Niigata	Niigata	0.1	0.062	Niigata Prefecture Route 565 north	
Niigata	Niigata	0.9	0.56	National Route 113 east / National Route 350 west	Northern end of concurrency with routes 113 and 350
Niigata	Niigata	1.4	0.87	Niigata Prefecture Route 33 south – Niigata Station	
Niigata	Niigata	2.3	1.4	Niigata Prefecture Route 3 east / Niigata Prefecture Route 464 north – Niigata City Office, Furumachi, Niigata West Port, Taihei Bridge	
Niigata	Niigata	3.1	1.9	Niigata Prefecture Route 51 west – Niigata Station Minamiguchi	
Niigata	Niigata	4.4	2.7	National Route 8 south / National Route 49 east	Shichikuyama Interchange; southern end of limited-access highway; northern end of concurrency with National Route 8
Niigata	Niigata	7.0	4.3	Niigata Prefecture Route 4 (Akamichi) – Yamanoshita, Oroshidanchi	Takeo Interchange
Niigata	Niigata	8.9	5.5	Niigata City Route 3 – Ōgata, Eguchi	Oyachi Interchange; northbound exit, southbound entrance
Niigata	Niigata	9.8	6.1	Niigata Prefecture Route 3 – Ōgata, Taihei Bridge	Ebigase Interchange
Niigata	Niigata	11.1	6.9	Niigata Prefecture Route 17 – Niigata Airport, Mokko Estate, Taihei Bridge, Nihonkai-Tōhoku Expressway	Hitoichi Interchange
Niigata	Niigata	13.1	8.1	Niigata Prefecture Route 27 south – Matsuhama; Niigata Prefecture Route 398 north – Niizaki	Nigorikawa Interchange
Niigata	Niigata	15.7	9.8	Niigata Prefecture Route 324 – Toyosaka Station, Niigata Race Course, Hokubu Industrial Estate	Race Course Interchange
Niigata	Niigata	18.6	11.6	Niigata Prefecture Route 46 – Fukushimagata, Shimamicho	Toyosaka Interchange
Niigata	Niigata	19.5	12.1		Toyosaka Parking Area
Niigata	Seirō	20.6	12.8	Niigata Prefecture Route 556 – Niigata East Port, Fujiyose, National Route 113	Higashiko Interchange; northbound exit, southbound entrance
Niigata	Seirō	21.2	13.2	Unnamed municipal road	Daibukoya Interchange; no southbound exit
Niigata	Seirō	22.7	14.1	Niigata Prefecture Route 204 – License Center, Hasuno, National Route 113	Hasuno Interchange
Niigata	Seirō	24.5	15.2	Niigata Prefecture Route 3 – Shunji Memorial Park, Sasaki	Seiro Interchange
Niigata	Seirō	25.6	15.9	Nihonkai-Tōhoku Expressway – Murakami, Niigata	Seiro-Shibata Interchange (E7 exit 4)
Niigata	Shibata	26.6	16.5	National Route 460 west – Agano, Tsukioka Spa, Central Shibata	Shibata Interchange; northern end of limited-access highway
Niigata	Shibata	29.0	18.0	Niigata Prefecture Route 544 north	
Niigata	Shibata	29.9	18.6	Niigata Prefecture Route 21 – Shunji Memorial Park, Shibata Castle	
Niigata	Shibata	30.4	18.9	National Route 290 south – Gosen, Shibata Hospital	Southern end of National Route 290 concurrency
Niigata	Shibata	32.0	19.9	National Route 290 north – Sugatani	Northern end of National Route 290 concurrency
Niigata	Shibata	33.2	20.6	Niigata Prefecture Route 60 / Niigata Prefecture Route 390	
Niigata	Shibata	33.4	20.8	Niigata Prefecture Route 343 north	
Niigata	Shibata	35.2	21.9	Niigata Prefecture Route 545	
Niigata	Shibata	38.5	23.9	Niigata Prefecture Route 292	
Niigata	Tainai	40.7	25.3	Niigata Prefecture Route 343 south / Niigata Prefecture Route 591 west – Muramatsuhama	
Niigata	Tainai	41.7	25.9	Niigata Prefecture Route 54 (Akane Street) north	
Niigata	Tainai	44.2	27.5	Niigata Prefecture Route 173 north	
Niigata	Tainai	46.4	28.8	Niigata Prefecture Route 53 south – Tarugahashi Park, Tainai Kannon; Niigata Prefecture Route 493 north – Kurokawa	
Niigata	Murakami	50.6	31.4	Niigata Prefecture Route 493 south	
Niigata	Murakami	51.5	32.0	National Route 113 – Momozakihama, National Route 345, Nihonkai-Tōhoku Expressway, Nanyo, Sekikawa	
Niigata	Murakami	53.2	33.1	Niigata Prefecture Route 182 west – Kanaya, Murakami City Arakawa Branch Office	
Niigata	Murakami	53.2	33.1	Niigata Prefecture Route 142 – National Route 290, National Route 345, Nihonkai-Tōhoku Expressway, Sekikawa	
Niigata	Murakami	56.2	34.9	National Route 290 south – Sekikawa; Niigata Prefecture Route 286 west – Central Murakami, Nihonkai-Tōhoku Expressway	Southern end of National Route 290 concurrency
Niigata	Murakami	57.4	35.7	Niigata Prefecture Route 207 east	
Niigata	Murakami	58.6	36.4	Niigata Prefecture Route 3 south – Sasagawanagare, Senami Onsen	Unsigned northern terminus of National Route 290
Niigata	Murakami	64.4	40.0	Niigata Prefecture Route 208 east – Nihonkai-Tōhoku Expressway	
Niigata	Murakami	68.7	42.7	Niigata Prefecture Route 291 south	
Niigata	Murakami	70.7	43.9	Niigata Prefecture Route 310 north	
Niigata	Murakami	83.2	51.7	Niigata Prefecture Route 6 north – Kangawa, National Route 345	
Niigata	Murakami	90.0	55.9	Niigata Prefecture Route 249 north	
Niigata	Murakami	99.2	61.6	National Route 345 south – Sasagawanagare	Southern end of National Route 345 concurrency
Niigata	Murakami	103.5	64.3	Niigata Prefecture Route 52 east – Fuya Station	
Yamagata	Tsuruoka	107.7	66.9	National Route 345 north – Kinomata, Onabe	Northern end of National Route 345 concurrency
Yamagata	Tsuruoka	116.5	72.4	Yamagata Prefecture Route 44 east – Nihonkai-Tōhoku Expressway, Atsumi Onsen, Atsumi Onsen Station, Tsuruoka City Office	
Yamagata	Tsuruoka	123.9	77.0	Yamagata Prefecture Route 61 east – Nihonkai-Tōhoku Expressway, Suganodai, Yamairagawa	
Yamagata	Tsuruoka	129.2	80.3	Yamagata Prefecture Route 334 east – Nihonkai-Tōhoku Expressway, Sanze Station	
Yamagata	Tsuruoka	130.7	81.2	Yamagata Prefecture Route 50 north – Yunohama, Yura	
Yamagata	Tsuruoka	132.3	82.2	Yamagata Prefecture Route 131 west – Yunohama	Southern end of Yamagata Prefecture Route 131 concurrency
Yamagata	Tsuruoka	135.0	83.9	Yamagata Prefecture Route 131 east – Yunohama	Northern end of Yamagata Prefecture Route 131 concurrency
Yamagata	Tsuruoka	137.2	85.3	Yamagata Prefecture Route 335 – Uzen-Mizusawa Station, Yutagawa, Tagawa	
Yamagata	Tsuruoka	137.7	85.6	Yamagata Prefecture Route 38 north – Oyama; Yamagata Prefecture Route 334 west – National Route 345, Tagawa	
Yamagata	Tsuruoka	139.3	86.6	Nihonkai-Tōhoku Expressway – Sakata, Niigata	Tsuruoka-nishi Interchange (E7 exit 16)
Yamagata	Tsuruoka	140.7	87.4	Yamagata Prefecture Route 332 north – Yamagata, Central Tsuruoka, National Route 112	
Yamagata	Tsuruoka	141.4	87.9	Yamagata Prefecture Route 338 – Yunohama, Oyama, Yutagawa	
Yamagata	Tsuruoka	143.2	89.0	Yamagata Expressway – Yamagata, Akita	Tsuruoka Interchange (E48 exit 12)
Yamagata	Tsuruoka	143.9	89.4	National Route 112 north – Yunohama, Ohama; Yamagata Prefecture Route 47 east – Mount Haguro, Tsuruoka City Office	Southern end of National Route 112 concurrency
Yamagata	Tsuruoka	146.1	90.8	Yamagata Prefecture Route 332 – Yunohama, Central Tsuruoka	
Yamagata	Tsuruoka	147.4	91.6	National Route 112 south – Yamagata, Sagae; Yamagata Prefecture Route 350 south – Takarada, Hodashi	Northern end of National Route 112 concurrency
Yamagata	Mikawa	151.0	93.8	Yamagata Prefecture Route 341 – Yunohama, Tachikawa, Fujishima	
Yamagata	Mikawa	153.6	95.4	Yamagata Prefecture Route 33 – Shonai Airport, Nihonkai-Tōhoku Expressway, Tachikawa, Amarume	
Yamagata	Mikawa	154.7	96.1	Yamagata Prefecture Route 356 – Hamnaka, Inoko	
Yamagata	Sakata	157.9	98.1	Yamagata Prefecture Route 357 – Kuromori	
Yamagata	Sakata	160.3	99.6	Nihonkai-Tōhoku Expressway – Yamagata, Niigata, Akita	Sakata Interchange (E7 exit 19)
Yamagata	Sakata	161.7	100.5	Yamagata Prefecture Route 38 west – Yunohama	Southern end of Yamagata Prefecture Route 38 concurrency
Yamagata	Sakata	162.3	100.8	Yamagata Prefecture Route 38 east – to Osaki, Shinjō, National Route 47 east	Interchange; western terminus of unsigned National Route 47, northern end of Yamagata Prefecture Route 38 concurrency
Yamagata	Sakata	164.5	102.2	Yamagata Prefecture Route 353 north – Central Sakata, Sakata Port, Sankyo Warehouse, Honma Art Museum	Partial interchange
Yamagata	Sakata	168.1	104.5	National Route 47 east – Osaki, Shinjō, Nihonkai-Tōhoku Expressway; Yamagata Prefecture Route 40 west – City Hall	Northern end of unsigned National Route 47 concurrency
Yamagata	Sakata	169.6	105.4	Yamagata Prefecture Route 352 – Sakata Station, Oishi	
Yamagata	Sakata	170.6	106.0	National Route 344 east – Kaneyama, Yawata; Yamagata Prefecture Route 40 west – Sakata Station	
Yamagata	Sakata	172.3	107.1	Yamagata Prefecture Route 352 – Central Sakata, Nihonkai-Tōhoku Expressway, Fukura, Yuza	
Yamagata	Sakata	174.0	108.1	National Route 112 south – Sakatakita Port, Ohama Wharf	Interchange
Yamagata	Sakata	175.6	109.1	Yamagata Prefecture Route 59 east – Yawata, Nihonkai-Tōhoku Expressway	
Yamagata	Yuza	178.5	110.9	Yamagata Prefecture Route 369 east – Mutsushinden	
Yamagata	Yuza	179.8	111.7	Yamagata Prefecture Route 374 east	
Yamagata	Yuza	181.2	112.6	Yamagata Prefecture Route 208 east – Ninotaki, Yuza Station	
Yamagata	Yuza	184.2	114.5	Yamagata Prefecture Route 375 east – Shimofujisaki	
Yamagata	Yuza	186.6	115.9	National Route 345 south – Tachikawa, Yawata	Southern end of National Route 345 concurrency
Yamagata	Yuza	187.2	116.3	National Route 345 north – Jūroku Rakan Iwa, Nishihama Bathing Place, Chokaionsenkyo	Northern end of National Route 345 concurrency
Yamagata	Yuza	189.7	117.9	Yamagata Prefecture Route 210 (Chokai Blue Line) – Jūroku Rakan Iwa, Chokaionsenkyo, Mount Chōkai, Odaira Mountain Cottage	Two-quadrant interchange
Yamagata	Yuza	192.2	119.4	National Route 345 south – Jūroku Rakan Iwa, Chokaionsenkyo	Northern terminus of National Route 345
Akita	Nikaho	205.0	127.4	Akita Prefecture Route 58 east – Nikaho City Hall, Nihonkai-Tōhoku Expressway	
Akita	Nikaho	211.9	131.7	Nihonkai-Tōhoku Expressway – Akita Airport, Akita, Kisakata, Sakata,	Konoura Interchange (E7 exit 12)
Akita	Nikaho	212.5	132.0	Akita Prefecture Route 290 – Konoura Station, Koide	Interchange
Akita	Nikaho	218.8	136.0	Akita Prefecture Route 32 east – Yashima, Chōkai Plateau; Akita Prefecture Route 166 north – Nikaho Station	
Akita	Nikaho	219.6	136.5	Nihonkai-Tōhoku Expressway – Akita Airport, Akita, Kisakata, Sakata,	Nikaho Interchange (E7 exit 13)
Akita	Yurihonjō	227.0	141.1	Akita Prefecture Route 43 (Chōkai Green Line) east – Chōkai Plateau, Nishime Station	
Akita	Yurihonjō	231.9	144.1	National Route 105 north / National Route 107 east / National Route 108 east / National Route 341 – Yuzawa, Yokote, Daisen, Akita Prefectural University, Nihonkai-Tōhoku Expressway, Central Honjō	Southern terminus of unsigned National Route 341
Akita	Yurihonjō	241.5	150.1	National Route 341 north – Matsugasaki	Northern end of unsigned National Route 341 concurrency
Akita	Yurihonjō	243.7	151.4	National Route 341 – Matsugasaki, Kameda	Interchange
Akita	Yurihonjō	250.2	155.5	Akita Prefecture Route 44 east – Akita Airport, Yuwa, Nihonkai-Tōhoku Expressway	
Akita	Akita	256.8	159.6	Akita Prefecture Route 43 east – Yuwa, Shimohama industrial area	
Akita	Akita	261.6	162.6	Akita Prefecture Route 56 north – Daisen, National Route 13	Interchange
Akita	Akita	264.5	164.4	Akita Prefecture Route 65 south – Yuwa, Omoriyama Zoo	Interchange
Akita	Akita	266.6	165.7	Akita Prefecture Route 65 – Mukaihama, Wariyama	Interchange
Akita	Akita	269.5	167.5	National Route 13 south / National Route 101 north – Yokote, Daisen; Akita Prefecture Route 26 east – Akita Station, City Office, Prefecture Office	Southern terminus of unsigned National Route 101
Akita	Akita	271.0	168.4	Akita Prefecture Route 65 south – Mukaihama	
Akita	Akita	273.5	169.9	Akita Prefecture Route 56 south – Central Akita, Akita Expressway	Southern end of Akita Prefecture Route 56 concurrency
Akita	Akita	275.2	171.0	Akita Prefecture Route 231 east – Kamishinjo	
Akita	Akita	276.7	171.9	Akita Prefecture Route 56 north (Ohama Street) – Oga Quasi-National Park	Northern end of Akita Prefecture Route 56 concurrency
Akita	Akita	276.9	172.1	Akita Prefecture Route 112 north – Kurokawa	
Akita	Katagami	281.6	175.0	Akita Prefecture Route 124 east – Akita Prefectural Museum, Koizumikata Park	
Akita	Katagami	285.8	177.6	Akita Route 41 south – Soegawa, Takaoka	
Akita	Akita	286.3	177.9	Akita Expressway – Noshiro, Ōdate, Akita, Kitakami; National Route 101 north – Oga, Tenno	Northern end of unsigned National Route 101 concurrency; Continuous green T interchange; E7 exit 9 (Shōwa-Ogahantō Interchange)
Akita	Katagami	287.8	178.8	Akita Prefecture Route 229 – Ōkubo Station, Toyokawa	
Akita	Katagami	292.1	181.5	National Route 285 east – Moriyoshi, Gojōme; Akita Prefecture Route 104 south – Iitagawa	
Akita	Ikawa	293.1	182.1	Akita Prefecture Route 303 south – Iitagawa Branch Office	
Akita	Ikawa	294.9	183.2	Akita Prefecture Route 228 east – Ikawa Town Office	
Akita	Gojōme	296.2	184.1	Akita Prefecture Route 219 north – Hachirōgata Town Office	
Akita	Hachirōgata	298.2	185.3	Akita Prefecture Route 15 north – Akita Expressway	
Akita	Hachirōgata	300.5	186.7	Akita Prefecture Route 220 east – Gojōme	
Akita	Hachirōgata	301.4	187.3	Akita Prefecture Route 219 south – Hachirōgata	
Akita	Mitane	308.0	191.4	Akita Prefecture Route 54 west – Oga, Ōgata; Akita Prefecture Route 37 north – Akita Expressway, Kamikoani	
Akita	Mitane	311.2	193.4	Akita Prefecture Route 217 north – Moritake	
Akita	Mitane	317.0	197.0	Akita Prefecture Route 211 east – Ukawa	
Akita	Mitane	317.2	197.1	Akita Prefecture Route 212 east – Moritake, Moritake Station	
Akita	Mitane	319.0	198.2	National Route 101 south – Ōga, Ōgata	Southern end of National Route 101 concurrency
Akita	Mitane	320.0	198.8	Akita Expressway – Noshiro, Ōdate, Akita, Kitakami	Hachiryū Interchange (E7 exit 12)
Akita	Noshiro	324.7	201.8	Akita Expressway – Ōdate, Aomori, Akita, Kitakami	Noshiro-minami Interchange (E7 exit 13)
Akita	Noshiro	329.3	204.6	National Route 101 north – Central Noshiro, Ajigasawa	Northern end of National Route 101 concurrency
Akita	Noshiro	329.9	205.0	Akita Prefecture Route 205 north – Noshiro Station; Akita Prefecture Route 210 south – Moritake	
Akita	Noshiro	333.5	207.2	Akita Prefecture Route 150 north – Higashinoshiro Station	
Akita	Noshiro	334.4	207.8	Akita Expressway – Ōdate, Aomori, Akita, Kitakami; Akita Prefecture Route 64 east – Happō	Noshiro-higashi Interchange (E7 exit 14)
Akita	Noshiro	335.8	208.7	Akita Prefecture Route 4 south – Moritake, Hiyama Castle Ruins	
Akita	Noshiro	344.1	213.8	Akita Prefecture Route 205 north – Tomine Station	
Akita	Noshiro	346.5	215.3	Akita Expressway south – Akita, Kitakami; Akita Prefecture Route 317 east – Futatsui	Futatsui-Shirakami Interchange (E7 exit 15)
Akita	Noshiro	349.1	216.9	Akita Prefecture Route 202 north – Umenai; Akita Prefecture Route 203 south – Futatsui	
Akita	Noshiro	351.0	218.1	Akita Prefecture Route 322 – Fujisato, Shirakami-Sanchi, Futatsui	Interchange
Akita	Noshiro	352.3	218.9	Akita Prefecture Route 322 north – Futatsui, Kimimachizaka Park	
Akita	Noshiro	353.0	219.3	Akita Prefecture Route 3 south – Moriyoshi	
Akita	Kitaakita	358.8	222.9	Akita Prefecture Route 325 south – Odate–Noshiro Airport	
Akita	Kitaakita	362.0	224.9	Akita Prefecture Route 196 east – Takanosu	
Akita	Kitaakita	366.1	227.5	Akita Prefecture Route 24 south – Takanosu, Kitaakita City Office	
Akita	Kitaakita	367.3	228.2	National Route 105 south – Moriyoshi, Akita Expressway, Odate–Noshiro Airport, Moriyoshizan Dam	
Akita	Kitaakita	369.0	229.3	Akita Prefecture Route 200 north – Iwaya	
Akita	Ōdate	375.8	233.5	Akita Prefecture Route 68 east – Yamase Dam, Koshiyama	
Akita	Ōdate	377.3	234.4	Akita Prefecture Route 52 east – Akita Expressway, Hinai	
Akita	Ōdate	379.3	235.7	National Route 103 north – Akita Expressway, Kazuno, Aomori, Hirosaki	
Akita	Ōdate	382.2	237.5	Akita Prefecture Route 102 south – National Route 103, Kazuno, Hinai	
Akita	Ōdate	383.9	238.5	Akita Prefecture Route 2 (Jukai Line) north – Ōdate Station	
Akita	Ōdate	385.7	239.7	Akita Prefecture Route 2 (Jukai Line) – Ōdate Station, Tōhoku Expressway, Kosaka, Ōdate Jukai Dome	
Akita	Ōdate	387.2	240.6	Akita Prefecture Route 192 north – Hanaoka	
Akita	Ōdate	388.1	241.2	Akita Expressway – Kosaka, Noshiro	Ōdate-kita Interchange (E7 exit 27)
Akita	Ōdate	393.0	244.2	Akita Prefecture Route 68 west – Hanaoka	
Aomori	Hirakawa	406.6	252.6	National Route 282 south – Kazuno, Kosaka	
Aomori	Hirakawa	409.0	254.1	Tōhoku Expressway – Aomori, Morioka, Sendai	Ikarigaseki Interchange (E4 exit 50)
Aomori	Hirakawa	411.2	255.5	Aomori Prefecture Route 202 west – Ikarigaseki Station	
Aomori	Ōwani	415.0	257.9	National Route 454 east – Lake Towada	
Aomori	Ōwani	417.3	259.3	Aomori Prefecture Route 198 (Kuradateoyu Street) west – Ōwani Spa Area	
Aomori	Ōwani	418.4	260.0	Aomori Prefecture Route 201 west – Ōwani Spa Area, Ōwani Onsen Ski Resort	
Aomori	Ōwani	420.1	261.0	Aomori Prefecture Route 201 east – Ōwani Spa Area, Ōwani Onsen Ski Resort	
Aomori	Ōwani	421.3	261.8	Aomori Prefecture Route 13 north – Kuroishi	
Aomori	Hirosaki	422.3	262.4	Aomori Prefecture Route 260 north – Central Hirosaki	
Aomori	Hirosaki	422.6	262.6	Tōhoku Expressway – Aomori, Morioka, Ōdate	Ōwani-Hirosaki Interchange (E4 exit 51)
Aomori	Hirosaki	423.7	263.3	Aomori Prefecture Route 41 (Hirosaki Loop Route) – Ishikawa, Hirakawa	
Aomori	Hirakawa	424.9	264.0	Aomori Prefecture Route 13 – Shirakami-Sanchi (Anmon Falls), Mount Iwaki, Kuroishi, Hirakawa	
Aomori	Hirosaki	427.4	265.6	Aomori Prefecture Route 144 – Hirakawa	
Aomori	Hirosaki	429.9	267.1	National Route 102 east / National Route 339 north – Lake Towada, Kuroishi, Tōhoku Expressway, Inakadate; Aomori Prefecture Route 109 west – Central Hirosaki, Hirosaki Castle	Interchange; southern terminus of unsigned National Route 339
Aomori	Hirosaki	431.5	268.1	Aomori Prefecture Route 3 west – Central Hirosaki; Akita Prefecture Route 268 east – Kuroishi	
Aomori	Hirosaki	433.0	269.1	Kita-Ōdori – Central Hirosaki, Hirosaki Castle, Naijoshi	Interchange
Aomori	Hirosaki	433.7	269.5	Aomori Prefecture Route 41 east – Naijoshi	Southern end of Aomori Prefecture Route 41 concurrency
Aomori	Hirosaki	435.2	270.4	Aomori Prefecture Route 41 west – Ajigasawa	Northern end of Aomori Prefecture Route 41 concurrency
Aomori	Hirosaki	435.8	270.8	Aomori Prefecture Route 260 south	
Aomori	Fujisaki	436.4	271.2	National Route 339 north – Itayanagi	Northern end of unsigned National Route 339 concurrency
Aomori	Fujisaki	437.4	271.8	National Route 339 north (National Route 339 Bypass) – Goshogawara, Itayanagi; Aomori Prefecture Route 110 east – Kawabe Station	
Aomori	Fujisaki	438.1	272.2	Aomori Prefecture Route 285 north – Kita-Tokiwa Station	
Aomori	Fujisaki	438.5	272.5	Aomori Prefecture Route 131	
Aomori	Fujisaki	440.2	273.5	Aomori Prefecture Route 38 – Goshogawara	
Aomori	Aomori	445.0	276.5	Aomori Prefecture Route 285 – Kita-Tokiwa Station	
Aomori	Aomori	446.9	277.7	Aomori Prefecture Route 285 – Namioka Station	
Aomori	Aomori	448.9	278.9	Aomori Prefecture Route 27 east – Aomori Airport	
Aomori	Aomori	452.0	280.9	Tsugaru Expressway – Goshogawara, Tōhoku Expressway	
Aomori	Aomori	453.5	281.8	National Route 101 – Goshogawara	
Aomori	Aomori	455.5	283.0	National Route 101 south – Daishaka	Southern end of unsigned National Route 101 concurrency
Aomori	Aomori	457.2	284.1	Aomori Prefecture Route 247 east – Tsurugasaka	
Aomori	Aomori	462.9	287.6	Aomori Prefecture Route 247 – Shinjō, Tsurugasaka	
Aomori	Aomori	464.3	288.5	National Route 7 north (Aomori Belt Highway) – Towada, Noheji, Lake Towada, Aomori Airport, Tōhoku Expressway,	
Aomori	Aomori	466.4	289.8	Aomori Prefecture Route 234 – Aburakawa, Tsugaru-Shinjō Station	Interchange
Aomori	Aomori	467.4	290.4	National Route 280 north (Uchimanbe Bypass) – Cape Tappi, Sotogahama	
Aomori	Aomori	470.5	292.4	Aomori Prefecture Route 247 west – Ishie	Interchange
Aomori	Aomori	470.9	292.6	National Route 280 north – Sotogahama	
Aomori	Aomori	471.4	292.9	Aomori Prefecture Route 44 east	No access from northbound traffic
Aomori	Aomori	471.6	293.0	Aomori Prefecture Route 120 north	Southern end of Aomori Prefecture Route 120 concurrency
Aomori	Aomori	471.8	293.2	National Route 4 south / National Route 45 south – Noheji, Towada, Morioka	Northern terminus; northern end of concurrency with Aomori Prefecture Route 120 and National Route 101; highway continues as National Route 4, Aomori Prefecture Route 120, and unsigned National Route 45
1.000 mi = 1.609 km; 1.000 km = 0.621 mi: Concurrency terminus; Incomplete access; Route transition

== Gallery ==
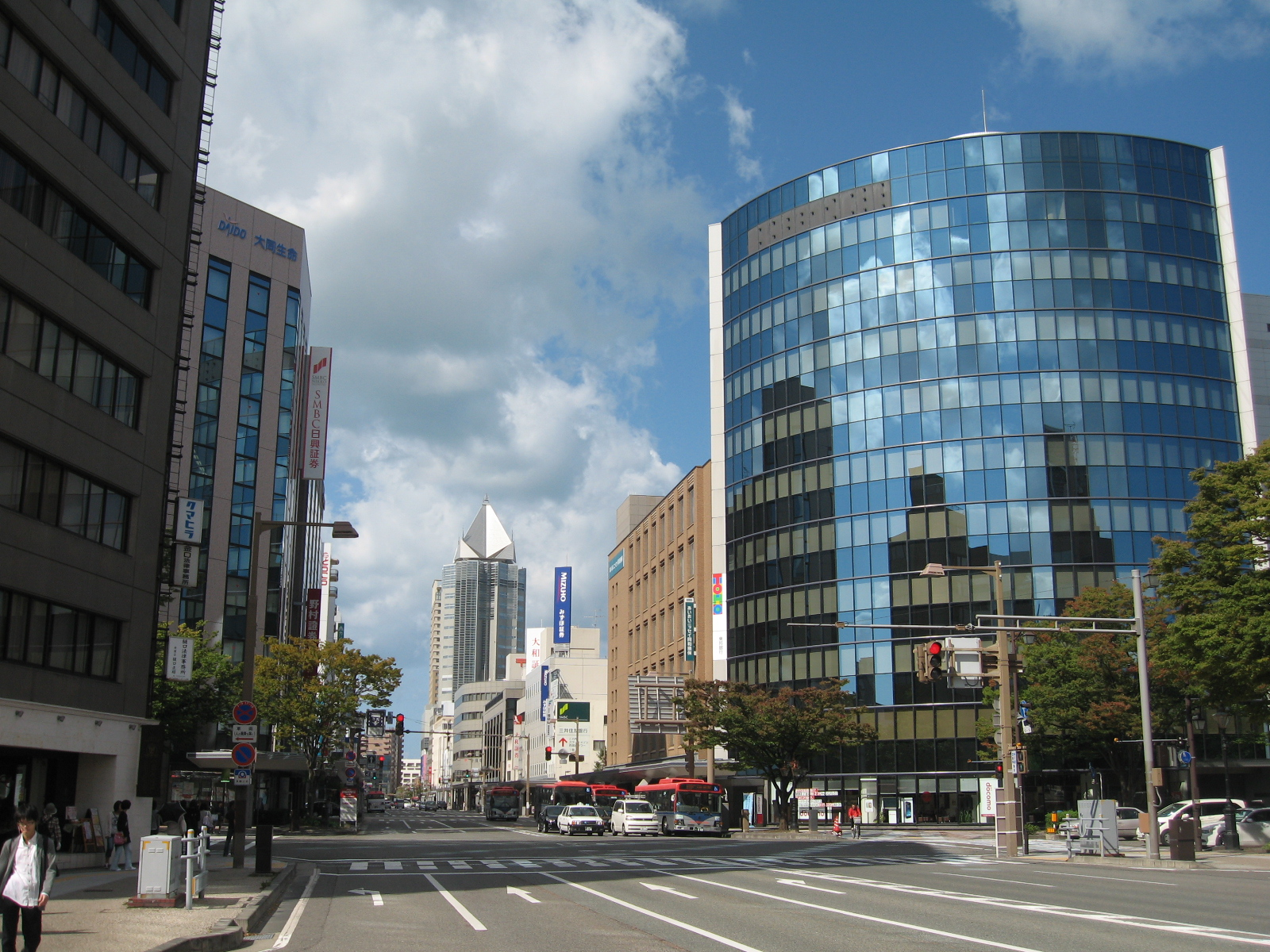
Masaya-koji Street, near the terminus of Route 7 in Niigata City

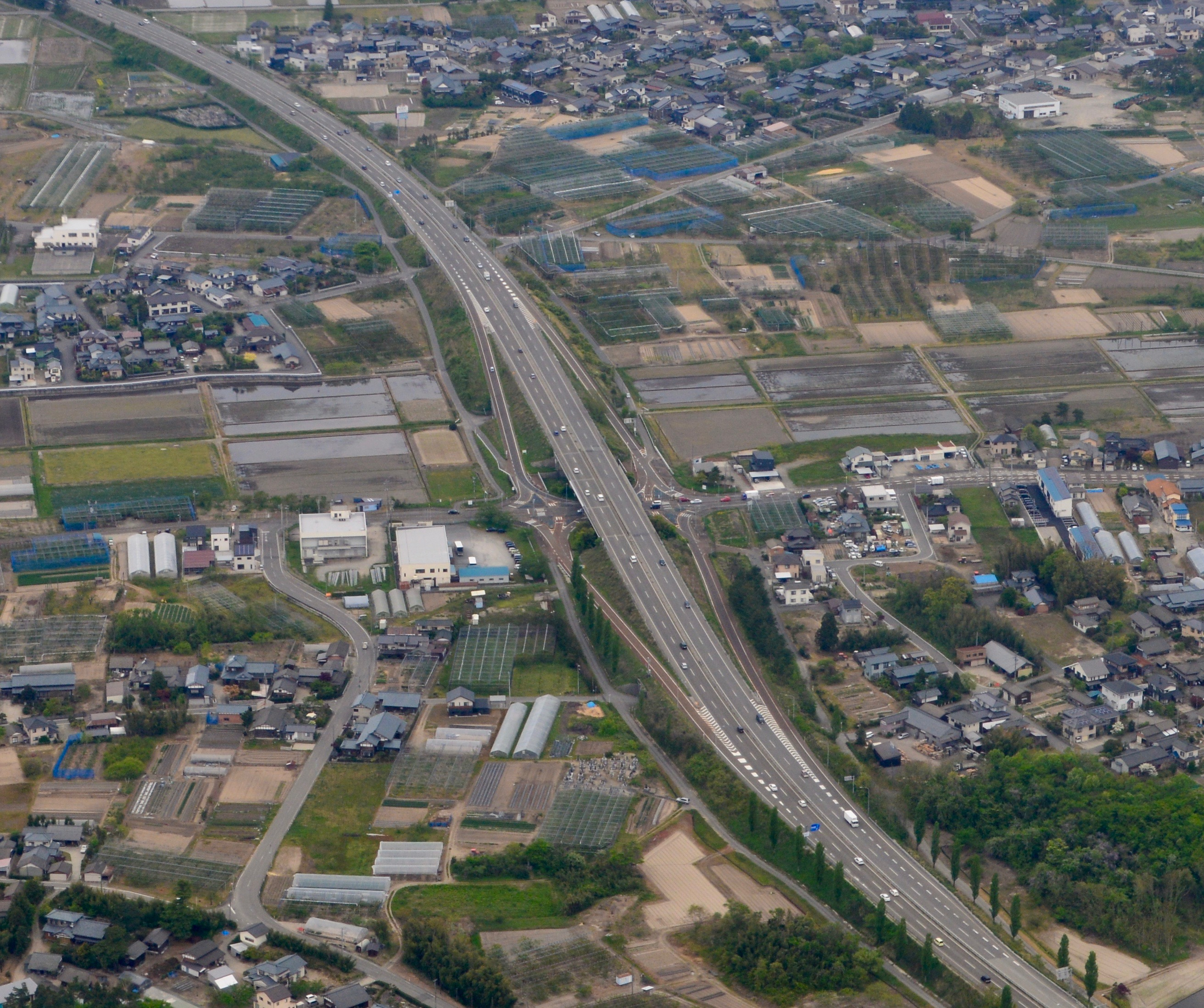
Shin-shin Bypass (limited-access highway) Seiro Interchange in Seirō, Niigata Prefectire

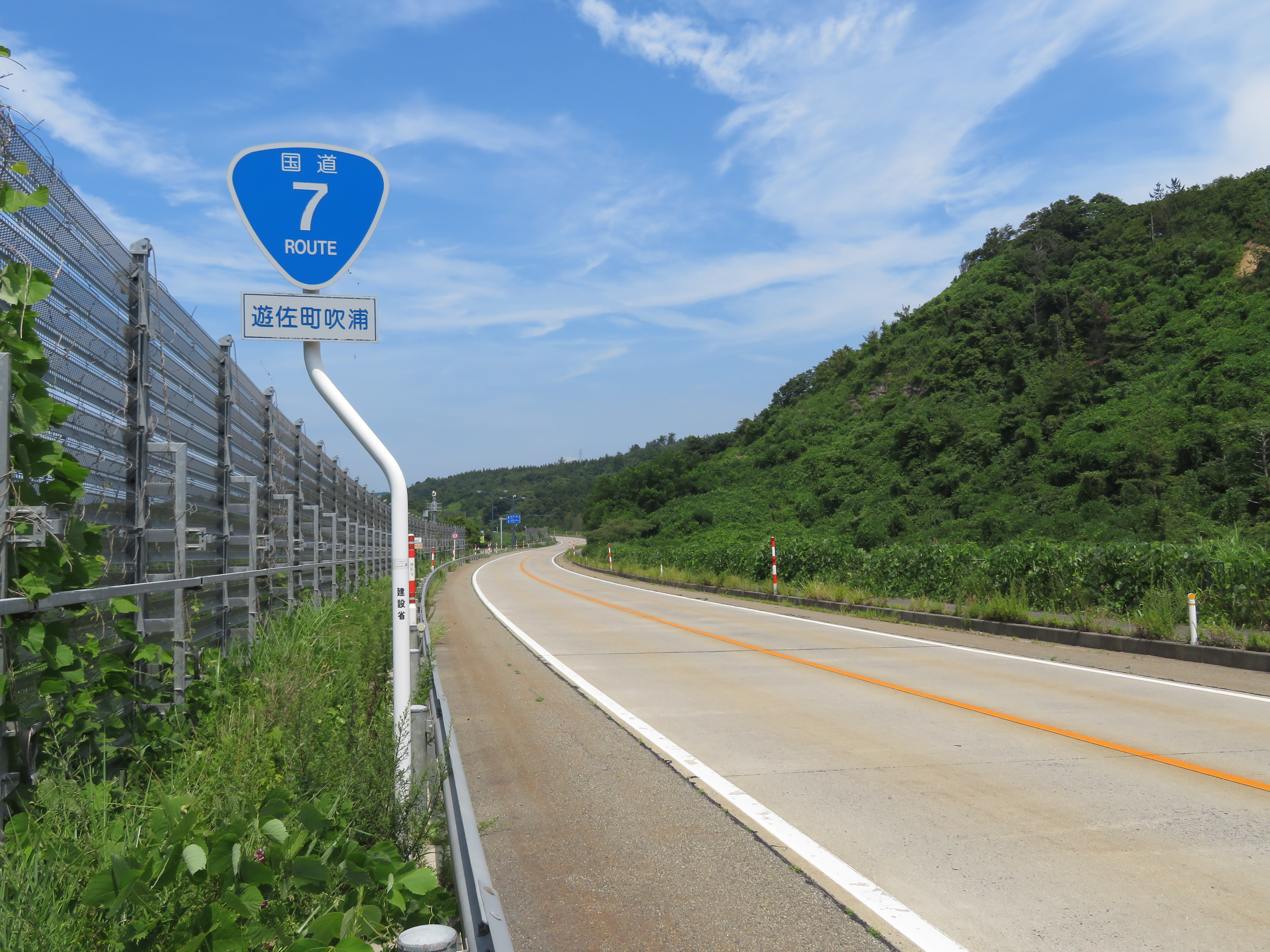
Fukura Bypass in Yuza, Yamagata Prefecture

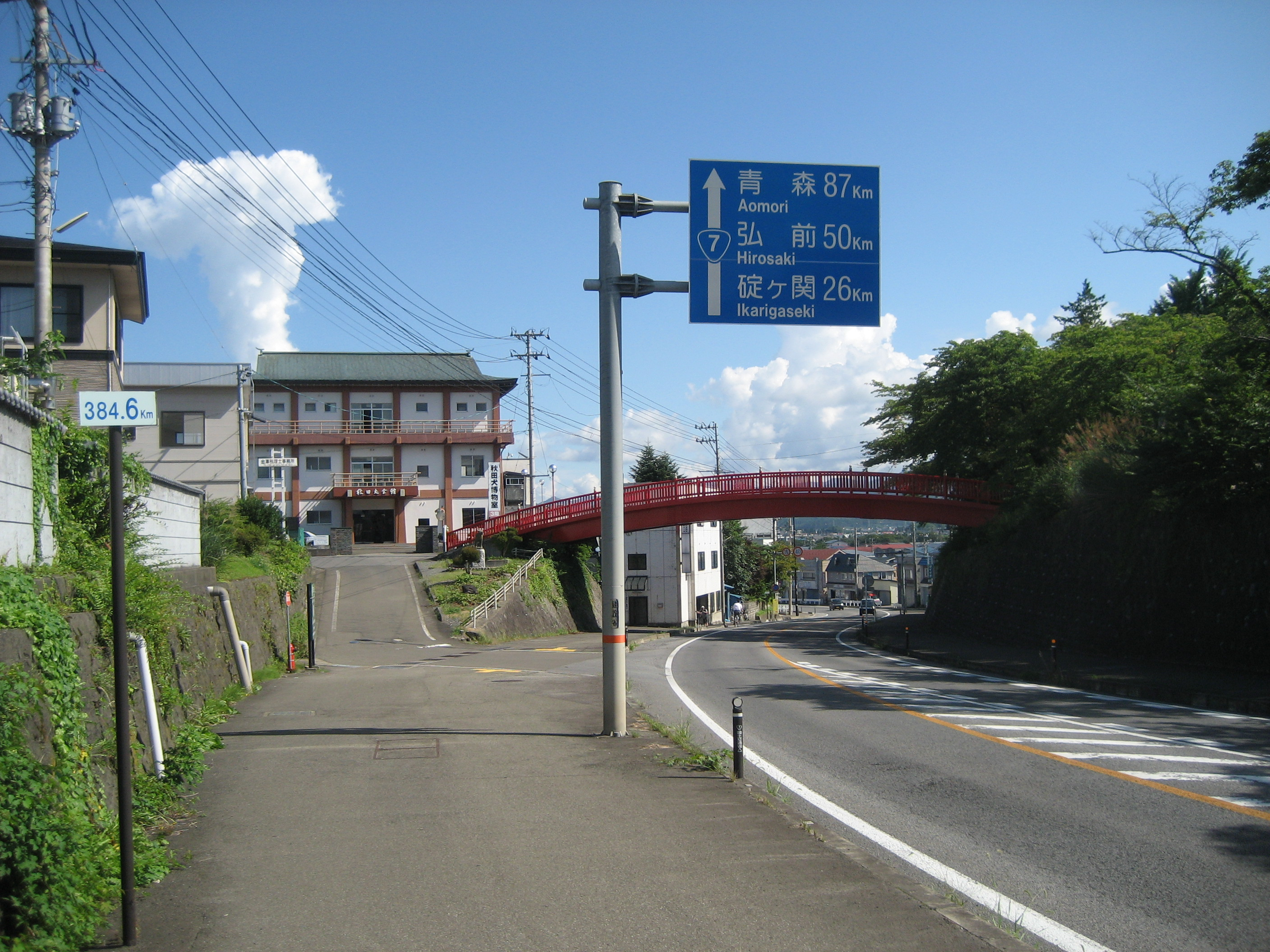
Route 7 in Ōdate, Akita Prefecture

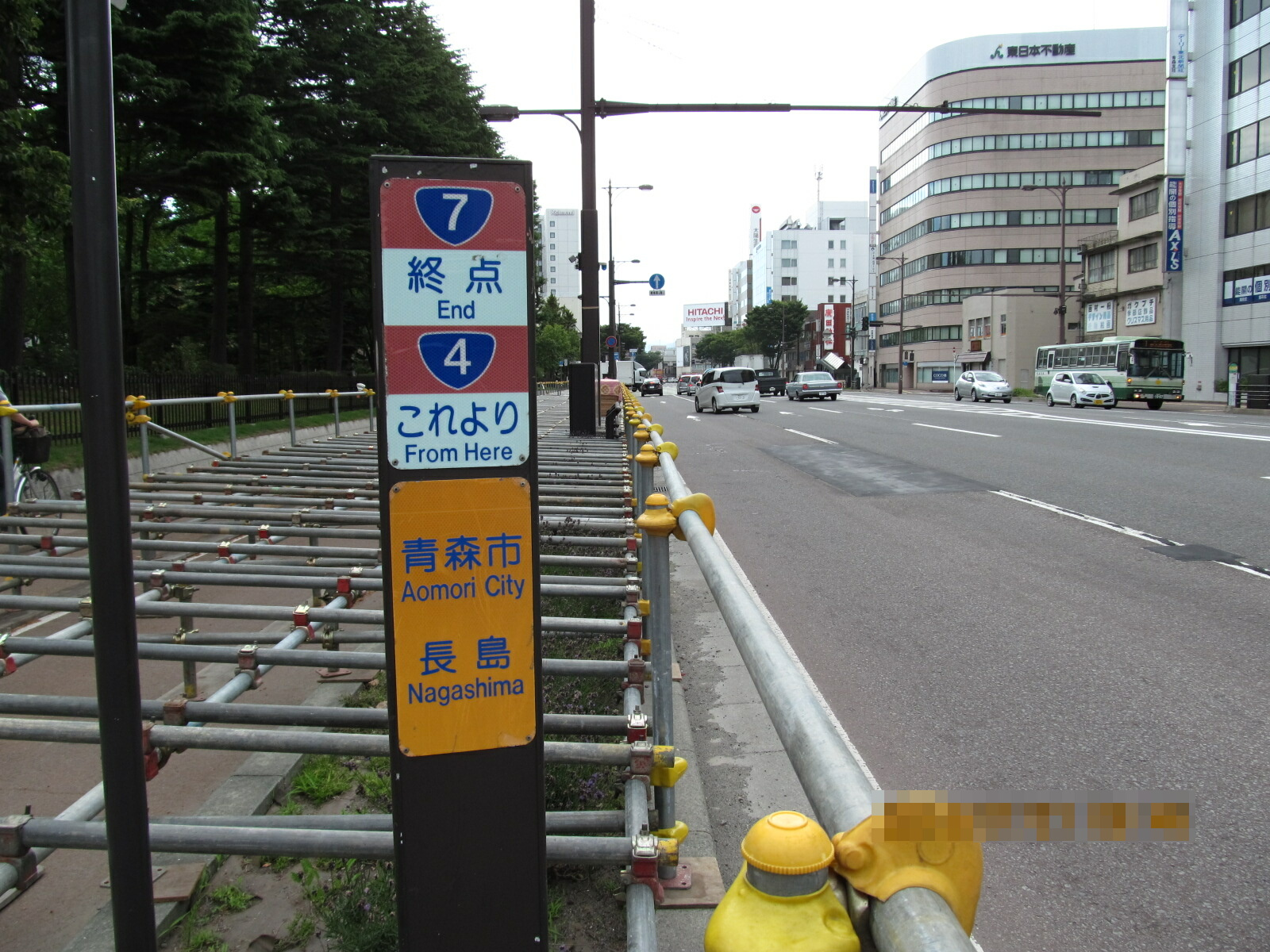
Terminus of Route 7 in Aomori City
