= Yuzawa-Yokote Road =

Road in Akita Prefecture, Japan

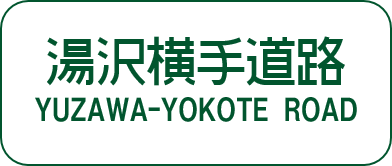
Yuzawa-Yokote Road
- 湯沢横手道路 (Yuzawa-Yokote Dōro)

Route information
- Maintained by East Nippon Expressway Company and Ministry of Land, Infrastructure, Transport and Tourism
- Length: 29.0 km (18.0 mi)
- Existed: July 1991–present
- Component highways: National Route 13

Major junctions
- South end: Ogachikomachi Interchange; National Route 13 in Yuzawa
- North end: Yokote Interchange; Akita Expressway in Yokote

Location
- Country: Japan

Highway system
- National highways of Japan; Expressways of Japan

The Yuzawa-Yokote Road (湯沢横手道路 Yuzawa-Yokote Dōro) is a two-lane partially-tolled road in Akita Prefecture connecting the cities Yuzawa and Yokote while bypassing the original routing of Japan National Route 13. The road is jointly managed by the East Nippon Expressway Company and the Ministry of Land, Infrastructure, Transport and Tourism (MLIT). It is numbered E13 under the MLIT's "2016 Proposal for Realization of Expressway Numbering."

After 30 November 2023, it became a part of Tōhoku-Chūō Expressway, and the motorway section is guided as Tōhoku-Chūō Expressway.

== Route description ==
The total length of Yuzawa-Yokote Road is 29.0 kilometers (18.0 mi). Distance markers on the road are derived from the distance markers of Route 13 rather than starting at zero at the origin of the road, so the beginning of the route at Route 13 in Yuzawa has a marker for 182.0 kilometers (113.1 mi) rather than 0.

== History ==
The first section of Yuzawa-Yokote Road opened in July 1991. The entire road was opened to traffic on 26 August 2007.

== List of major junctions ==
The entire route is in Akita Prefecture. Yuzawa-Yokote Road is a direct extension of National Route 13. Therefore, the distance markers continue from the sequence of Route 13, starting at 182.0 kilometres (113.1 mi).

| Location | km | mi | Exit | Name | Destinations | Notes |
|---|---|---|---|---|---|---|
| Yuzawa | 182.6 | 113.5 | – | Ogachikomachi | National Route 13 – to National Route 108, Shinjo, Yamagata | Southern terminus; at-grade intersection |
| Yuzawa | 186.2 | 115.7 | – | Sukawa | Akita Prefecture Route 51 | |
| Yuzawa | 191.7 | 119.1 | — | Mitsuseki | National Route 13 | |
| Yuzawa | 193.6 | 120.3 | — | Emergency Exit | Akita Prefecture Route 278 | Access for Ogachi Chūō Hospital; Authorized vehicles only |
| Yuzawa | 195.7 | 121.6 | — | Yuzawa | National Route 398 | Southern end of tolled section |
| Yokote | 203.1 | 126.2 | TB | Jūmonji | National Route 13 | |
| Yokote | 203.5 | 126.4 | — | Jūmonji | | |
| Yokote | 210.0 | 130.5 | 3 | Yokote | Akita Expressway – Kitakami, Iwate, Akita | Northern end of tolled expressway section, the road continues as an at-grade arterial |
| Yokote | 211.6 | 131.5 | – | Yokote | National Route 13 / National Route 107 – Akita, Daisen, Yuzawa, Yurihonjō | Northern terminus; at-grade intersection |
Through as National Route 13
1.000 mi = 1.609 km; 1.000 km = 0.621 mi: Incomplete access; Tolled
