= Japan National Route 13 =

National highway in Japan

National Route 13
- 国道13号

Route information
- Length: 306.1 km (190.2 mi)
- Existed: 4 December 1952–present

Major junctions
- North end: National Route 7 in Akita
- South end: National Route 4 in Fukushima

Location
- Country: Japan

Highway system
- National highways of Japan; Expressways of Japan
← National Route 12	→ National Route 14

National Route 13 (国道13号, Kokudō Jūsan-gō) is a highway in Japan on the island of Honshū which runs from Fukushima in Fukushima Prefecture to Akita in Akita Prefecture.

== Route data ==
- Length: 306.1 kilometers (190.2 mi)
- Origin: Fukushima (originates at junction with Route 4)
- Terminus: Akita (ends at Junction with Route 7)
- Major cities: Fukushima, Yonezawa, Yamagata, Akita

== History ==
- 4 December 1952: First Class National Highway 13 (from Fukushima to Akita)
- 1 April 1965: General National Highway 13 (from Fukushima to Akita)

== Municipalities passed through ==
- Fukushima Prefecture
  - Fukushima
- Yamagata Prefecture
  - Yonezawa - Takahata - Nan'yō - Kaminoyama - Yamagata - Tendō - Higashine - Murayama - Obanazawa - Ōishida - Funagata - Shinjō - Kaneyama - Mamurogawa
- Akita Prefecture
  - Yuzawa - Yokote - Misato - Daisen - Akita

== Major intersections ==
- in Fukushima Prefecture
  - Routes 4, 115
- in Yamagata Prefecture
  - Routes 47, 48, 112, 113, 121, 286, 287, 344, 347 and 458
- in Akita Prefecture
  - Routes 7, 46, 105, 107, 108, 341, 342, 397 and 398

== See also ==
- Tōhoku-Chūō Expressway
