= Tōhoku-Chūō Expressway =

Expressway in Fukushima and Yamagata Prefectures, Japan

Tōhoku-Chūō Expressway
- 東北中央自動車道

Route information
- Length: 235.3 km (146.2 mi) Main Route (planned)
- Existed: 1997–present
- Component highways: National Route 13 / National Route 115

Major junctions
- South end: Sōma Junction; Jōban Expressway in Sōma, Fukushima
- North end: Yokote Interchange; Akita Expressway in Yokote, Akita

Location
- Country: Japan
- Major cities: Date, Fukushima, Yonezawa, Yamagata, Tendō, Higashine, Yokote

Highway system
- National highways of Japan; Expressways of Japan

The Tōhoku-Chūō Expressway (東北中央自動車道, Tōhoku-Chūō Jidōsha-dō) (lit. Central Tōhoku Expressway) is a 2-laned national expressway in the Tōhoku region of Japan. It is owned and operated by East Nippon Expressway Company and Ministry of Land, Infrastructure, Transport and Tourism (MLIT). The expressway is numbered E13 under the MLIT's "2016 Proposal for Realization of Expressway Numbering."

== Overview ==
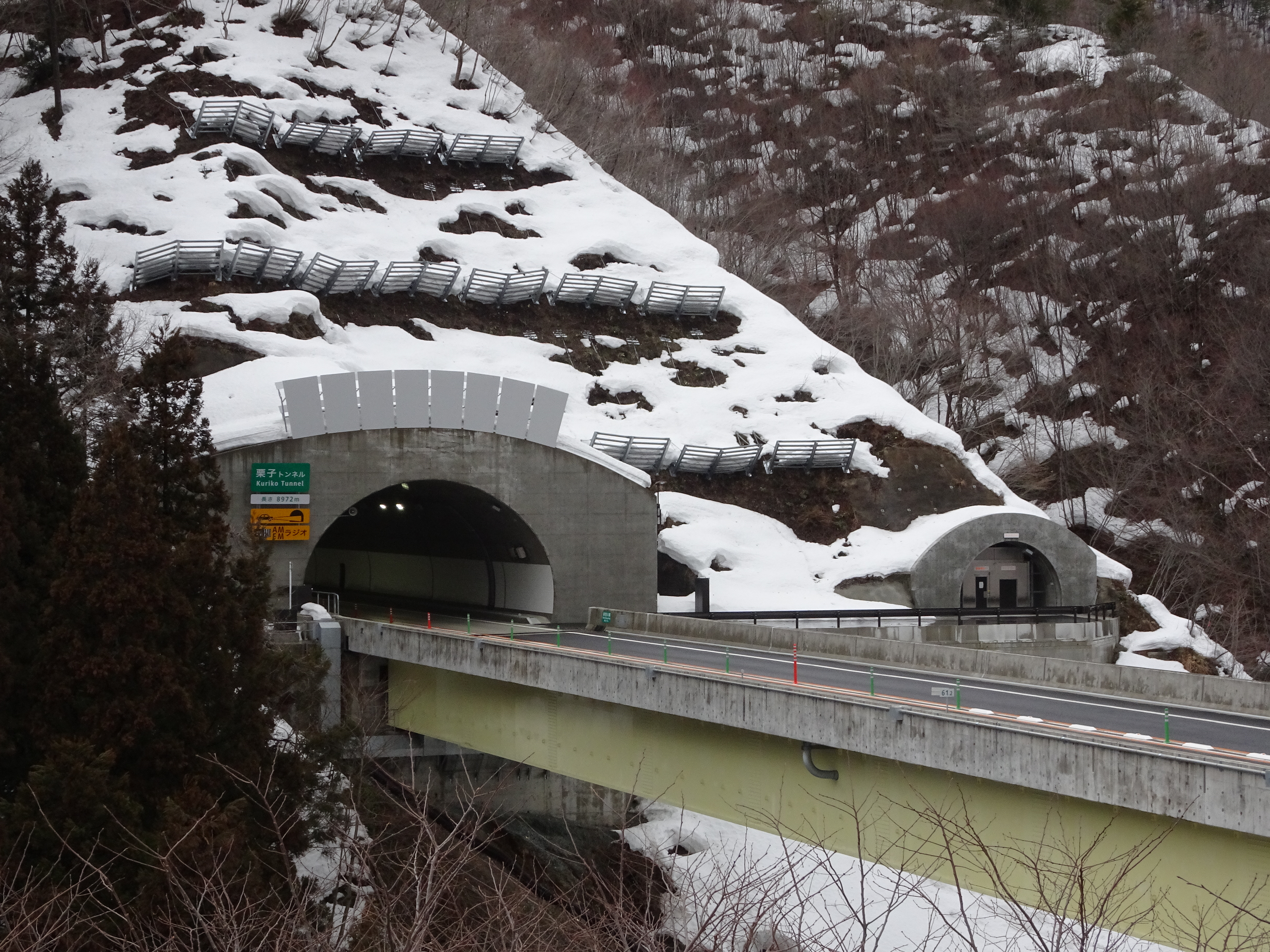
Kuriko Tunnel as seen from the entrance in Fukushima Prefecture

The expressway is incomplete in many areas, however it is planned to eventually be a continuous route spanning northern Fukushima, Yamagata, and southern Akita prefectures. As of July 2019, all gaps in the expressway are in the process of being eliminated, with all gaps in near the border between Yamagata and Akita set to be removed.

The route of the expressway parallels the Ōu Main Line of East Japan Railway Company for most of its length.

The speed limit is 70 km/h along the majority of the route, there are short 80 km/h sections between Yonezawa-kita and Yonezawa-Hachimanbara interchanges and Higashine and Higashine-kita interchanges.

== History ==
After 1984, the roads along this section were sporadically constructed, but in 1987, the Cabinet decided that they would be developed together as the Tohoku Chuo Expressway from Soma, Fukushima to Yokote, Akita. Since then the road has gradually been extended by adding short extensions. The 8.8 km (5.5 mi) long Yonezawa-Nan'yō Road was incorporated into the Tōhoku-Chūō Expressway on 4 November 2017. MLIT began construction on the last gap of the road on 30 March 2018, a 3.5 km (2.2 mi) long section in Kaneyama, Yamagata.

Effective November 30, 2023, the section of Yuzawa-Yokote Road connecting Yuzawa and Yokote, which is an automobile-only road, was incorporated into the Tōhoku-Chūō Expressway.

== List of major junctions ==
- PA - parking area, SA - service area, SIC - smart interchange, TB - toll gate

Prefecture	Location	km	mi	Exit	Name	Destinations	Notes
Fukushima	Sōma	0.0	0.0	23	Sōma	Jōban Expressway – Iwaki, Mito, Sendai, Ishinomaki; National Route 115 – Central Sōma, Fukushima	Southern terminus
Fukushima	Sōma	6.0	3.7	1	Sōma-Yamakami	National Route 115 – Central Sōma, Fukushima	Northbound entrance, southbound exit
Fukushima	Sōma	16.5	10.3	2	Sōma-Tamano	National Route 115 – Sōma, Fukushima	Southbound entrance, northbound exit
Fukushima	Date	21.5	13.4	3	Ryōzen-Iitate	National Route 115 – Sōma, Fukushima	Southbound exit, northbound entrance
Fukushima	Date	33.5	20.8	4	Ryōzen	National Route 115 – Sōma, Fukushima, Central Ryōzen	Temporary at-grade intersection
Fukushima	Date	40.9	25.4	5	Date-chūō		
Fukushima	Date	43.7	27.2	6	Date-Koori	National Route 4 – Shiroishi, Fukushima	
Fukushima	Koori	45.7	28.4	22-1 / TB	Koori	Tōhoku Expressway north – to Yamagata Expressway, Sendai	Southern end of Tōhoku Expressway concurrency
Fukushima	Koori	Tōhoku Expressway concurrency					
Fukushima	Fukushima	49.5 50.0	30.8 31.1	21-1 / TB	Fukushima	Tōhoku Expressway south – Utsunomiya, Tokyo	Northern end of Tōhoku Expressway concurrency
Fukushima	Fukushima	50.9	31.6	7	Fukushima-Ōzasō	Fukushima Prefecture Route 5 (Kaminagura Iizaka Date Route) – to National Route 13, National Route 115, Aizuwakamatsu, Yonezawa, Central Fukushima	
Fukushima/Yamagata border		61.2 69.2	38.0 43.0	Kuriko Tunnel; marking the border between Fukushima and Yamagata prefectures			
Yamagata	Yonezawa	77.5	48.2	8	Yonezawa-Hachimanpara	National Route 13 – Yamagata, Nan'yō, Koriyama, Fukushima	
Yamagata	Yonezawa	82.2	51.1	9	Yonezawa-chūō	Yamagata Prefecture Route 1 (Yonezawa Takahata Route)	
Yamagata	Yonezawa	86.5	53.7	10 / TB	Yonezawa-kita	National Route 13 / National Route 121 (Yonezawa Bypass)	
Yamagata	Takahata	95.3	59.2	11	Nan'yō-Takahata	National Route 13 (Nan'yō Bypass) / National Route 113 (Akayu Bypass)	
Yamagata	Nan'yō	102.4	63.6	PA	Nan'yō		
Yamagata	Kaminoyama	110.6	68.7	12	Kaminoyama Onsen	National Route 13 (Kaminoyama Bypass) / National Route 458 north	
Yamagata	Kaminoyama	119.7	74.4	13	Yamagata-Kaminoyama	National Route 13 (Yamagata Bypass)	
Yamagata	Yamagata	127.0	78.9	PA / SIC	Yamagata		Smart interchange
Yamagata	Yamagata	130.1	80.8	14	Yamagata-chūō	Yamagata Prefecture Route 18 (Yamagata Asahi Route)	
Yamagata	Yamagata	135.2	84.0	15	Yamagata	Yamagata Expressway – to Tōhoku Expressway, Sendai, Sakata	
Yamagata	Tendō	141.8 142.4	88.1 88.5	16 / TB	Tendō	Yamagata Prefecture Route 23 (Tendō Ōe Route)	
Yamagata	Higashine	146.8	91.2	17	Higashine	National Route 287	
Yamagata	Higashine	151.1	93.9	18	Higashine-kita	Yamagata Prefecture Route 25 (Sagae Murayama Route)	
Yamagata	Murayama	154.7	96.1	19	Murayama	Yamagata Prefecture Route 25 (Sagae Murayama Route)	
Yamagata	Murayama	160.0	99.4	20-1	Murayama-Natori	Yamagata Prefecture Route 381 (Murayama Ōishida Route)	Southbound exit, northbound entrance
Yamagata	Murayama	160.3	99.6	20-2	Murayama-Motoiida	Yamagata Prefecture Route 36 (Shinjō Jinengo Murayama Route)	Southbound exit, northbound entrance
Yamagata	Murayama	164.8	102.4	21	Ōishida-Murayama	Yamagata Prefecture Route 189 (Ōishida Tsuchiuda Route)	
Yamagata	Obanazawa	170.1	105.7	22	Obanazawa	National Route 347	
Yamagata	Obanazawa	174.1	108.2	–	Nokurosawa	National Route 13 (Obanazawa Bypass)	Southbound exit, northbound entrance
Yamagata	Obanazawa	176.5	109.7	–	Obanazawa-kita	National Route 13	
Yamagata	Obanazawa	180.2	112.0	–	Kawarago	National Route 13	Southbound exit, northbound entrance
Yamagata	Funagata	184.1	114.4	–	Funagata	Yamagata Prefecture Route 56 (Shinjō-Funagata Route)	
Yamagata	Shinjō	188.3	117.0	27	Shinjō	National Route 47 (Shinjō-minami Bypass) / Yamagata Prefecture Route 34	
Yamagata	Shinjō	193.0	119.9	28	Shinjō-Sakegawa	Yamagata Prefecture Route 308	
Yamagata	Shinjō	201.2	125.0	29	Shinjō-Mamurogawa	Yamagata Prefecture Route 319	At-grade intersection
Yamagata	9.3 km gap in the expressway, connection is made primarily by National Route 13						
Yamagata	Kaneyama	210.5	130.8	–	Kaneyama-kita	National Route 13 north	At-grade intersection
Yamagata	Kaneyama	215.4	133.8	–	Nakada	National Route 13	Southbound exit, northbound entrance
Yamagata	Mamurogawa	220.4	137.0	–	Nozoki	National Route 13 south	At-grade intersection
7.2 km gap in the expressway, connection is made by National Route 13
Akita	Yuzawa	227.6	141.4	–	Kamiinnai	National Route 13 north	Southern terminus; at-grade intersection
Akita	Yuzawa	230.6	143.3	36	Shimoinnai	National Route 13 south	At-grade intersection
Akita	Yuzawa	234.3	145.6	37	Ogachikomachi	National Route 13 south	At-grade intersection
Akita	Yuzawa	237.9	147.8	–	Sukawa	National Route 13 south	
Akita	Yuzawa	243.4	151.2	–	Mitsuseki	National Route 13 south	
Akita	Yuzawa			—	Emergency Exit	Akita Prefecture Route 278	Access for Ogachi Chūō Hospital; Authorized vehicles only
Akita	Yuzawa	247.5	153.8	—	Yuzawa	National Route 398	Southern end of the tolled section
Akita	Yokote	254.9	158.4	TB	Jūmonji		
Akita	Yokote	255.2	158.6	—	Jūmonji	National Route 13	
Akita	Yokote	210.0	130.5	3	Yokote	Akita Expressway – Kitakami, Iwate, Akita	Northern end of tolled expressway section, the road continues as an at-grade arterial
Akita	Yokote	261.0	162.2	–	Yokote	National Route 13 / National Route 107 – Akita, Daisen, Yuzawa, Yurihonjō	Northern terminus; at-grade intersection
Akita	Through as National Route 13						
1.000 mi = 1.609 km; 1.000 km = 0.621 mi: Concurrency terminus; Incomplete access; Unopened

== See also ==
- Yuzawa-Yokote Road
