= Nihonkai-Tōhoku Expressway =

Expressway in Japan

Nihonkai-Tōhoku Expressway
- 日本海東北自動車道

Route information
- Maintained by East Nippon Expressway Company
- Length: 53.6 km (33.3 mi) Tolled sections
- Existed: 2001–present

Major junctions
- From: Niigata-Chūō Junction in Niigata, Niigata; Hokuriku Expressway; Ban-etsu Expressway
- To: Kawabe Junction in Akita, Akita; Akita Expressway

Location
- Country: Japan
- Major cities: Shibata, Tainai, Tsuruoka, Sakata, Nikaho, Yurihonjō

Highway system
- National highways of Japan; Expressways of Japan

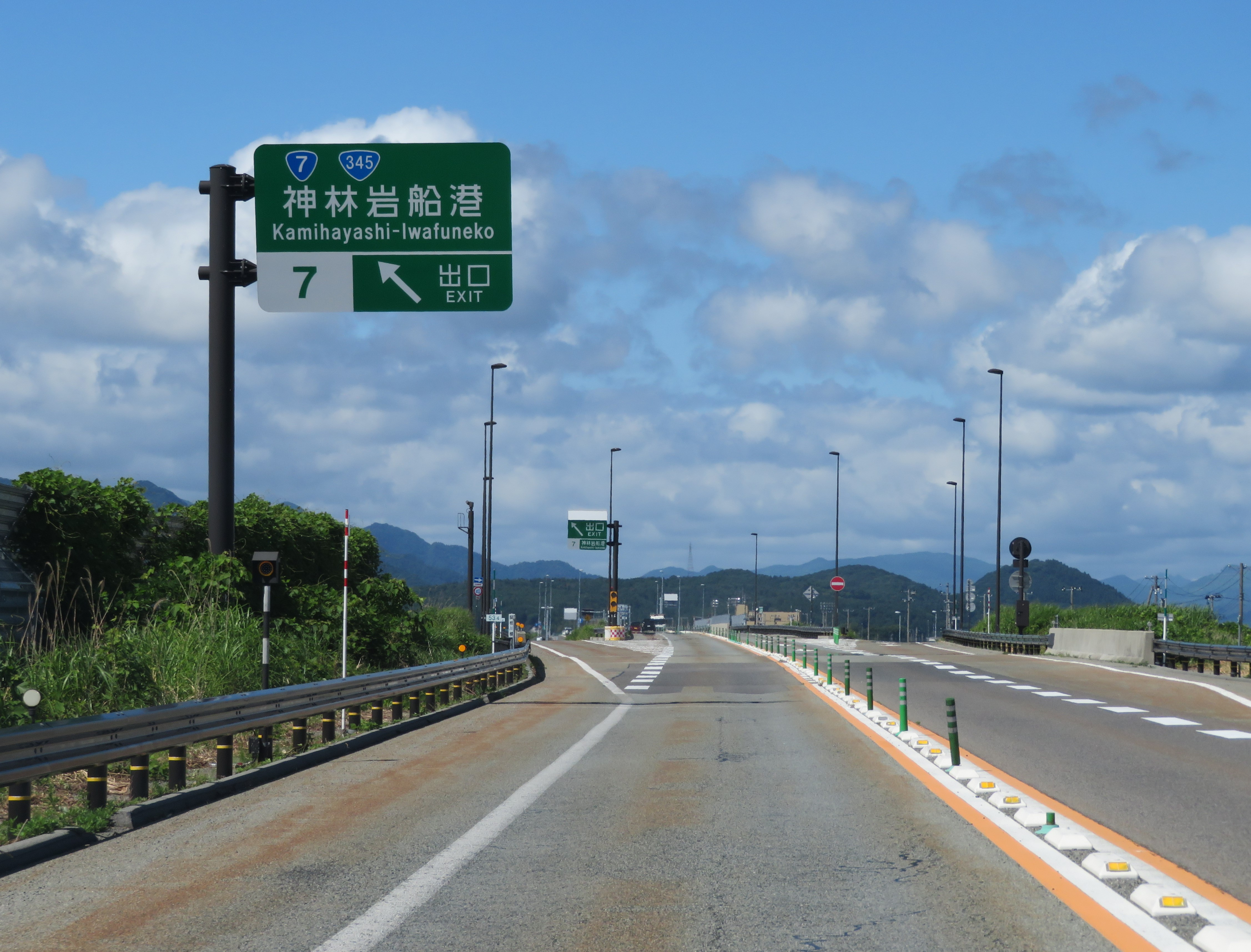
Kamihayashi-Iwafuneko Interchange

The Nihonkai-Tōhoku Expressway (日本海東北自動車道, Nihonkai Tōhoku Jidōsha-dō) is a national expressway in Japan. It is owned and operated by East Nippon Expressway Company.

== Naming ==
The course of the expressway takes it alongside the coastline of the Sea of Japan (Nihonkai) in the Tōhoku region of Japan.

The Nihonkai-Tōhoku Expressway is the operating name for the sections of the Nihonkai Engan Tōhoku Expressway that are operated by East Nippon Expressway Company. The Nihonkai Engan Tōhoku Expressway is an official designation consisting of several routes that link Niigata with Aomori via Yamagata and Akita, reaching a total of approximately 322 km.

== Overview ==
The first section of the expressway was opened to traffic in 2001. As of March 2008 the expressway incomplete in many areas. The next section is scheduled to open in 2009 (Nakajō Interchange to Arakawa Interchange) to coincide with the National Sports Festival which is planned to be held in Niigata that year. After this, all future sections will be built according to the New Direct Control System, whereby the burden for construction costs will be shared by the national and local governments and no tolls will be collected. Currently the section between Honjō Interchange and Iwaki Interchange operates according to this principle.

The expressway is 4 lanes from Niigata-Chūō Junction to Toyosaka Service Area, and 2 lanes for all remaining sections.

The route parallels the Uetsu Main Line of East Japan Railway Company and National Route 7 for much of its length.

== List of interchanges and features ==
- IC - interchange, SIC - smart interchange, JCT - junction, SA - service area, PA - parking area, BS - bus stop, TB - toll gate, BR - bridge, TN - tunnel

=== Niigata section ===
No.	Name	Connections	Dist. from Origin	Dist. from Terminus	Bus Stop	Notes	Location (all in Niigata)
Through to Hokuriku Expressway
(42)	Niigata-Chūō JCT	Ban-etsu Expressway	0.0	67.5			Kōnan-ku, Niigata
1[43]	Niigata-Kameda IC	National Route 49	3.2	64.3			Kōnan-ku, Niigata
1-1/BS	Niigata-Higashi SIC/Nishino Bus Stop	Pref. Route 4 (Niigata Port Yokogo Route)	7.4	60.1	○		Kōnan-ku, Niigata
2[44]	Niigata Airport IC	Pref. Route 16 (Niigata Kameda Uchino Route)	9.2	58.3			Kōnan-ku, Niigata
2-1/SA	Toyosaka SA/SIC	Pref. Route 27 (Niigata Yasuda Route)	11.7	55.8		SIC: Nakajō-bound exit, Niigata-bound entrance only	Kita-ku, Niigata
BS	Kuzutsuka Bus Stop		16.6	50.9	○		Kita-ku, Niigata
3	Toyosaka- Niigatahigashikō IC	Pref. Route 46 (Niigata Chūō Kanjō Route)	18.3	49.2			Kita-ku, Niigata
4	Seirō-Shibata IC	National Route 7 (Niigata Bypass)	25.7	41.8	○		Seirō
BS	Kajikawa-Shiunji Bus Stop		31.6	35.9	○		Shibata
	Emergency Exit		↓	↑		Access for Shibata Hospital; Authorized vehicles only	Shibata
5	Nakajō IC	Pref. Route 591 (Nakajō Inter Route)	36.9	30.6			Tainai
TB	Nakajō Toll Gate		37.0	30.5			Tainai
BS	Tainai Bus Stop		41.4	26.1	○		Tainai
6	Arakawa-Tainai IC	National Route 113	46.6	20.9			Murakami
PA/BS	Arakawa PA/BS		49.1	18.4	X	Bus Stop closed	Murakami
7	Kamihayashi-Iwafunekō IC		53.7	13.8			Murakami
8	Murakami-Senamionsen IC	Pref. Route 286 (Iwafune Port Route); Pref. Route 531 (Murakami Kamihayashi Route)	57.7	9.8			Murakami
9	Murakami-Saberi IC	Pref. Route 207 (Ōkurida Murakami Route)	61.4	6.1		Asahi-bound exit, Murakami-bound entrance only	Murakami
10	Asahi-Miomote IC	Pref. Route 349 (Tsuruoka Murakami Route)	63.7	4.2		Asahi-bound exit, Murakami-bound entrance only	Murakami
11	Asahi-Mahoroba IC	Pref. Route 208 (Koage Sarusawa Route)	67.5	0			Murakami
1.000 mi = 1.609 km; 1.000 km = 0.621 mi: Closed/former; Incomplete access

=== Yamagata section ===
No.	Name	Connections	Dist. from Origin	Dist. from Terminus	Bus Stop	Notes	Location (all in Yamagata)
13	Atsumi-Onsen IC	Pref. Route 348 (Atsumigawa Kinomata Oiwagawa Route)	104.2				Tsuruoka
14	Iragawa IC	Pref. Route 61 (Sugenodai Katanorizawa Route)	112.1			Atsumi-bound exit, Tsuruoka-bound entrance only	Tsuruoka
15	Sanze IC		116.9			Atsumi-bound exit, Tsuruoka-bound entrance only	Tsuruoka
PA	Yabiki PA		121.5; 121.6			Tsuruoka-bound; Atsumi-bound; Ordinary cars only	Tsuruoka
16	Tsuruoka-nishi IC	National Route 7	125.4				Tsuruoka
17	Tsuruoka JCT	Yamagata Expressway	130.1			Atsumi ←→ Yamagata Expwy: No access	Tsuruoka
18	Shōnai Airport IC	Pref. Route 33 (Shōnai Airport Tachikawa Route) – Shonai Airport	138.8				Sakata
19	Sakata IC/Toll Gate	National Route 7 Pref. Route 40 (Sakata Matsuyama Route)	144.9				Sakata
19-1	Sakata-chuo IC	National Route 47	149.7				Sakata
20	Sakata-Minato IC	Pref. Route 59 (Sakata Yahata Route)	156.4				Sakata
	Yuza-Hiko IC	National Route 7				Planned	Yuza
	Yuza-Jurizuka IC	National Route 7				Planned	Yuza
	Yuza-Chokai IC	National Route 345				Planned	Yuza
1.000 mi = 1.609 km; 1.000 km = 0.621 mi: Incomplete access; Unopened

=== Akita section ===
No.	Name	Connections	Dist. from Origin	Dist. from Terminus	Bus Stop	Notes	Location (all in Akita)
11	Kisakata IC	Pref. Route 58 (Kisakata Yashima Route)	0.0	64.5			Nikaho
12	Konoura IC	National Route 7	6.8	57.7			Nikaho
13	Nikaho IC	National Route 7	13.7	50.8			Nikaho
	(Ryōzenji temporary IC)		15.0	49.5		Abolished on 27 October 2012	Nikaho
PA	Nishime PA		20.0	44.5			Yurihonjō
14	Honjō IC	National Route 107	26.2	38.3			Yurihonjō
14-1	Ōuchi JCT	National Route 105	35.4	29.1			Yurihonjō
14-2	Matsugasaki-Kameda IC		40.3	22.2			Yurihonjō
TN	Futago Tunnel		↓	↑			Yurihonjō
15	Iwaki IC	Pref. Route 44 (Yūwa Iwaki Route)	45.8	16.7			Yurihonjō
	Yūwa PA					Open in 2020	Akita
TB	Akita Airport Toll Gate		59.7	2.8			Akita
16	Akita Airport IC	Pref. Route 61 (Akita Goshono Yūwa Route)	60.1	2.4			Akita
5-1	Kawabe JCT	Akita Expressway	64.5	0.0			Akita
1.000 mi = 1.609 km; 1.000 km = 0.621 mi: Closed/former; Unopened
