= Futatsui, Akita =

Futatsui 二ツ井町
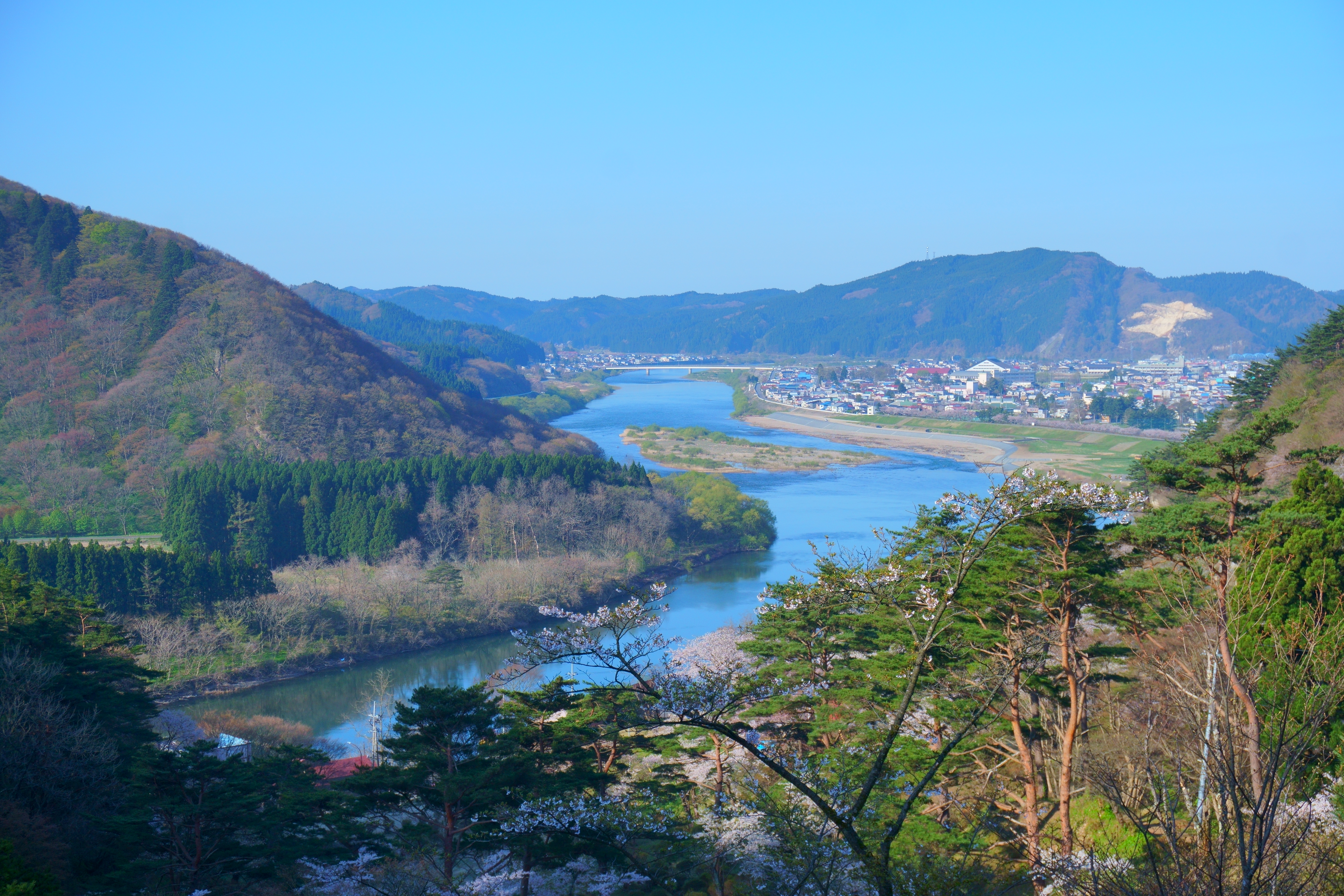

- Location within Japan Location within Akita Prefecture
- Coordinates: 40°12′19.9″N 140°13′54.6″E
- Country: Japan
- Prefecture: Akita
- District: Yamamoto

Futatsui (二ツ井町, Futatsui-machi) was a town located in Yamamoto District, Akita Prefecture, Japan.

As of 2003, the town had an estimated population of 11,421 and a population density of 62.96 persons per km^{2}. The total area was 181.40 km^{2}.

While Futatsui is the name of the settlement at the center of town, Futatsui actually consists of a collection of several villages at its outskirts. To the north is Taneume, to the east Tenjin, to the south is Nibuna and Tashiro, and to the west is Kirishi and Tomine.

Futatsui is famous for having the tallest virgin cedar tree in Japan, as well as a hill, Kimimachi-zaka—named by the Emperor when he came to visit the town. Kimimachi-zaka is especially well known for its autumn leaves, and the park that covers the hill is extensive and well maintained.

The town has several small Shinto shrines, one of which, at the center of town, holds the heaviest portable shrine in the area. Locals carry this shrine across town on Children's Day (May 5) as a climax to Golden Week.

To the east, near the Route 7 overpass is the town's Buddhist temple. The temple was transported on top of a hill to make way for Route 7, as was the graveyard.

The town is home to the 'Million Dollar Toilet,' an unofficial tribute to pork barrel spending, just off of Route 7 on the east side of town.

On the eastern border of Futatsui is Yakushi, a hill that sports a large Sugichi-kun in summer and autumn, and operates as a small ski area in winter. It is one of few ski areas in northern Akita that offers night skiing.

On March 21, 2006, Futatsui was merged into the expanded city of Noshiro.
