= Japan National Route 341 =

Road in Akita prefecture, Japan

National Route 341
- 国道341号
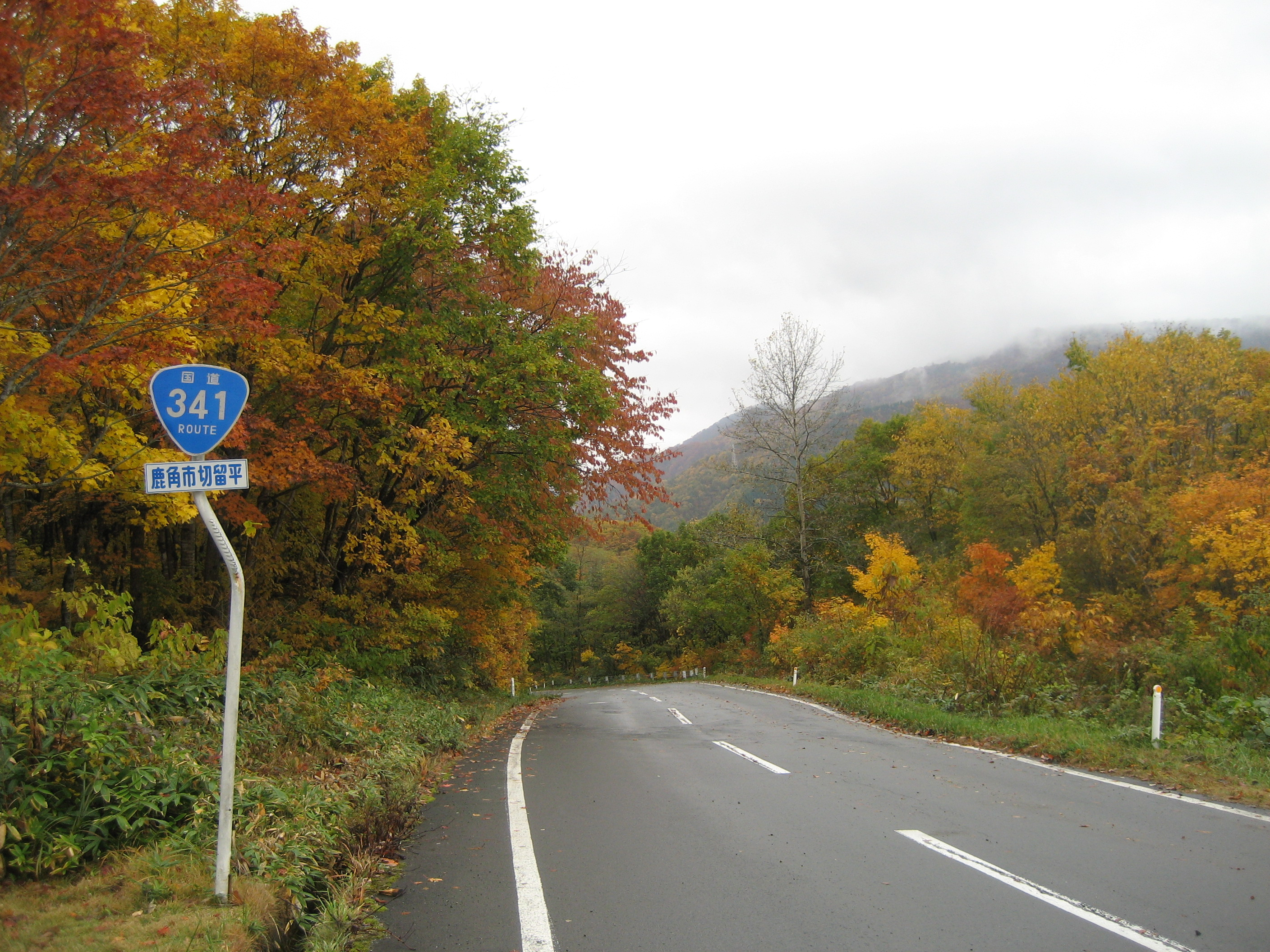

Route information
- Length: 168.7 km (104.8 mi)

Location
- Country: Japan

Highway system
- National highways of Japan; Expressways of Japan
← National Route 340	→ National Route 342

National Route 341 is a national highway of Japan connecting Kazuno, Akita and Yurihonjō, Akita in Japan, with a total length of 168.7 km (104.83 mi).
