= Japan National Route 286 =

National highway in Japan

National Route 286
- 国道286号
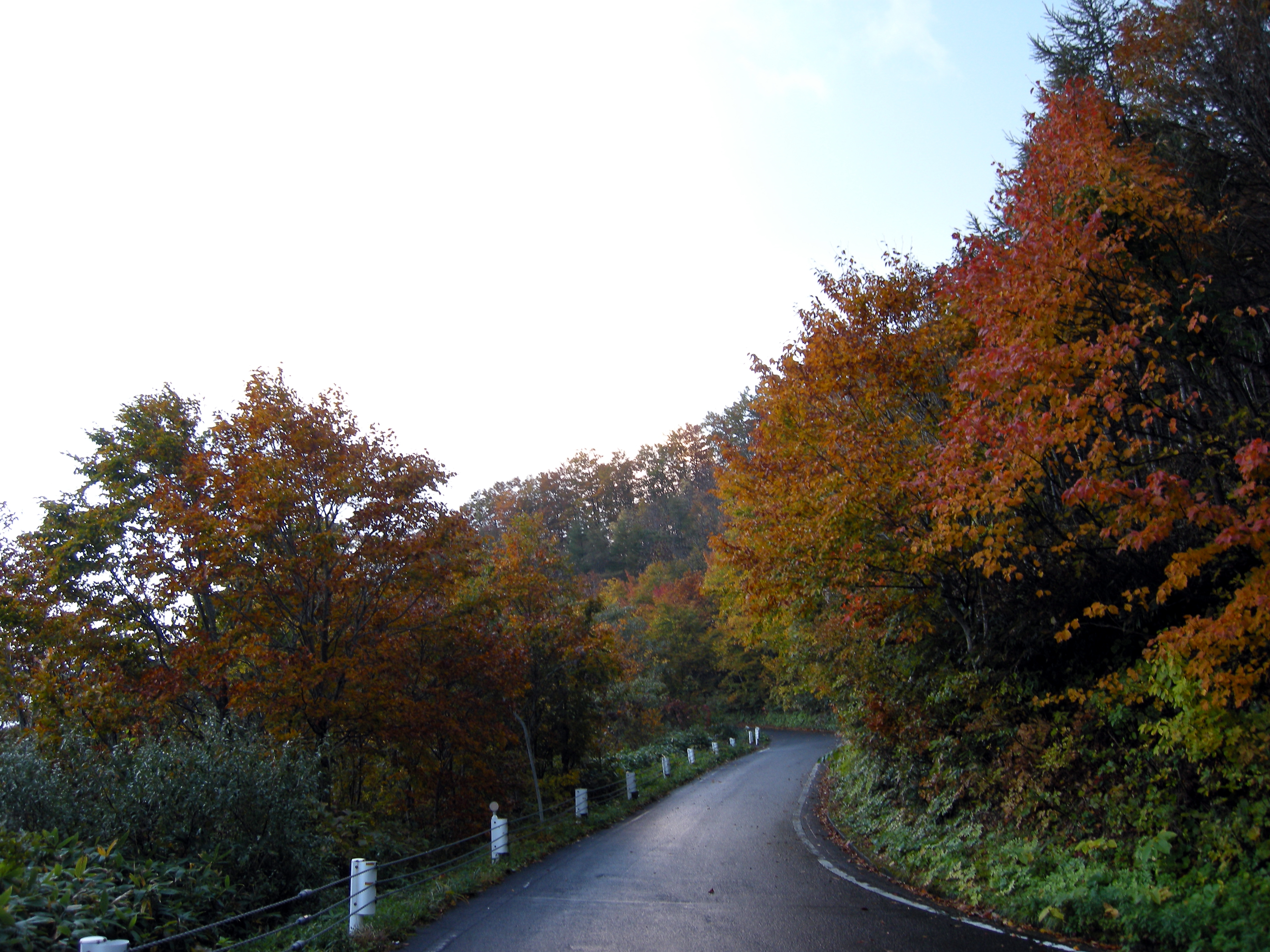

Route information
- Length: 61.9 km (38.5 mi)

Location
- Country: Japan

Highway system
- National highways of Japan; Expressways of Japan
← National Route 285	→ National Route 287

National Route 286 is a national highway of Japan connecting Taihaku-ku, Sendai and Yamagata, Yamagata in Japan, with a total length of 61.9 km (38.46 mi).
