= Japan National Route 458 =

National highway in Japan

National Route 458
- 国道458号
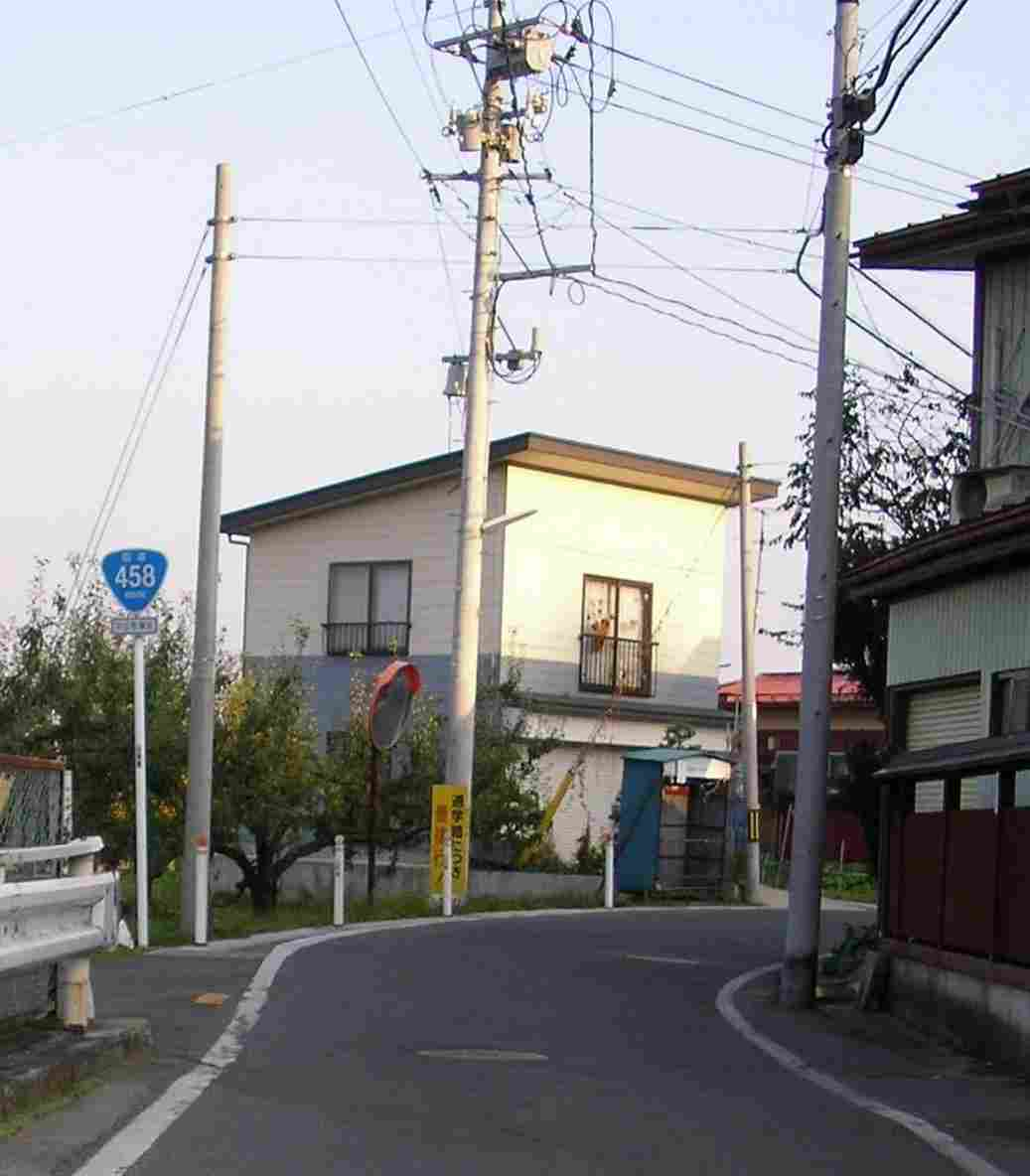

Route information
- Length: 112.5 km (69.9 mi)

Location
- Country: Japan

Highway system
- National highways of Japan; Expressways of Japan
| ← National Route 457 | → National Route 459 |

National Route 458 is a national highway of Japan connecting the towns of Shinjō and Kaminoyama in Yamagata prefecture, with a total length of 112.5 km (69.9 mi).
