= Yamagata Terrsa =

Concert hall in Yamagata Prefecture, Japan

Yamagata Terrsa 山形テルサ
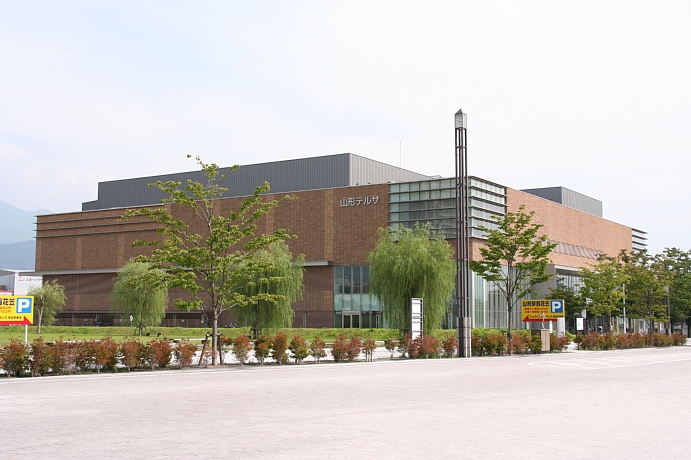

General information
- Location: 1-2-3 Futaba-chō, Yamagata, Yamagata Prefecture, Japan
- Coordinates: 38°14′50″N 140°19′29″E
- Opened: 1 April 2001

Other information
- Seating capacity: 811 (Terrsa Hall); 400 (Applause Hall)

Website
- Official website (in Japanese)

Yamagata Terrsa (山形テルサ, Yamagata Teresa) is a concert hall that opened in Yamagata, Yamagata Prefecture, Japan in 2001. The principal performance venue for the Yamagata Symphony Orchestra, the wood-lined main hall, with 811 seats, lays claim to one of the finest acoustics in Japan.

== See also ==
- Yamagin Kenmin Hall
- Yamagata Prefectural Museum
- Yamagata Museum of Art
- Nagata Acoustics
