= Dewazakura Museum of Art =

- 出羽桜美術館
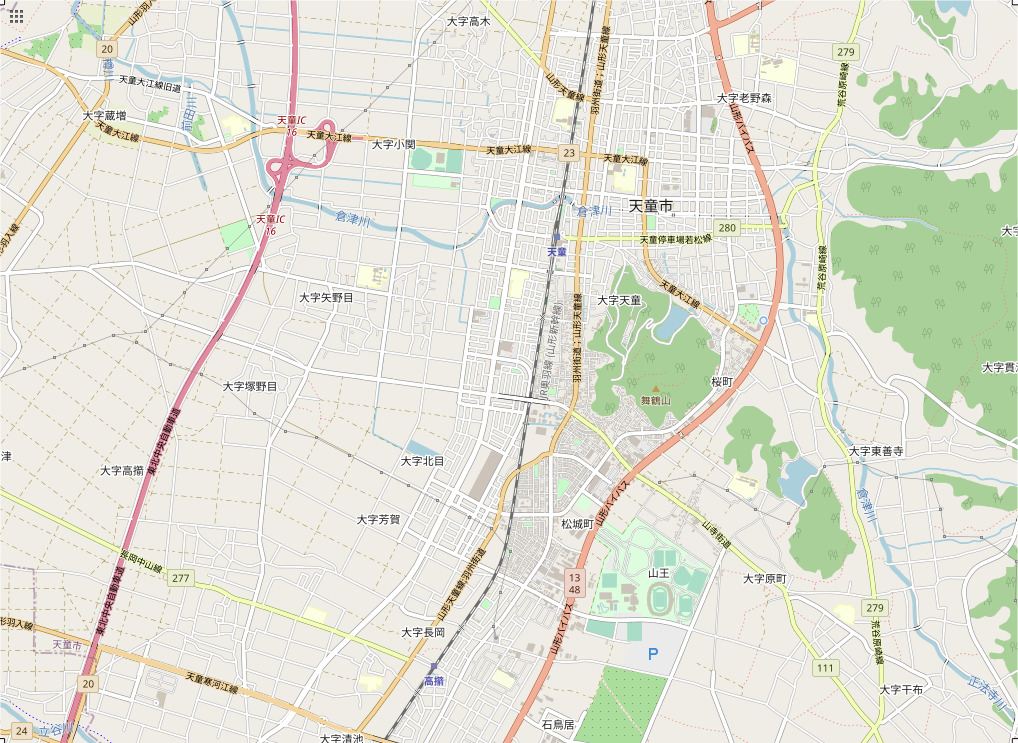
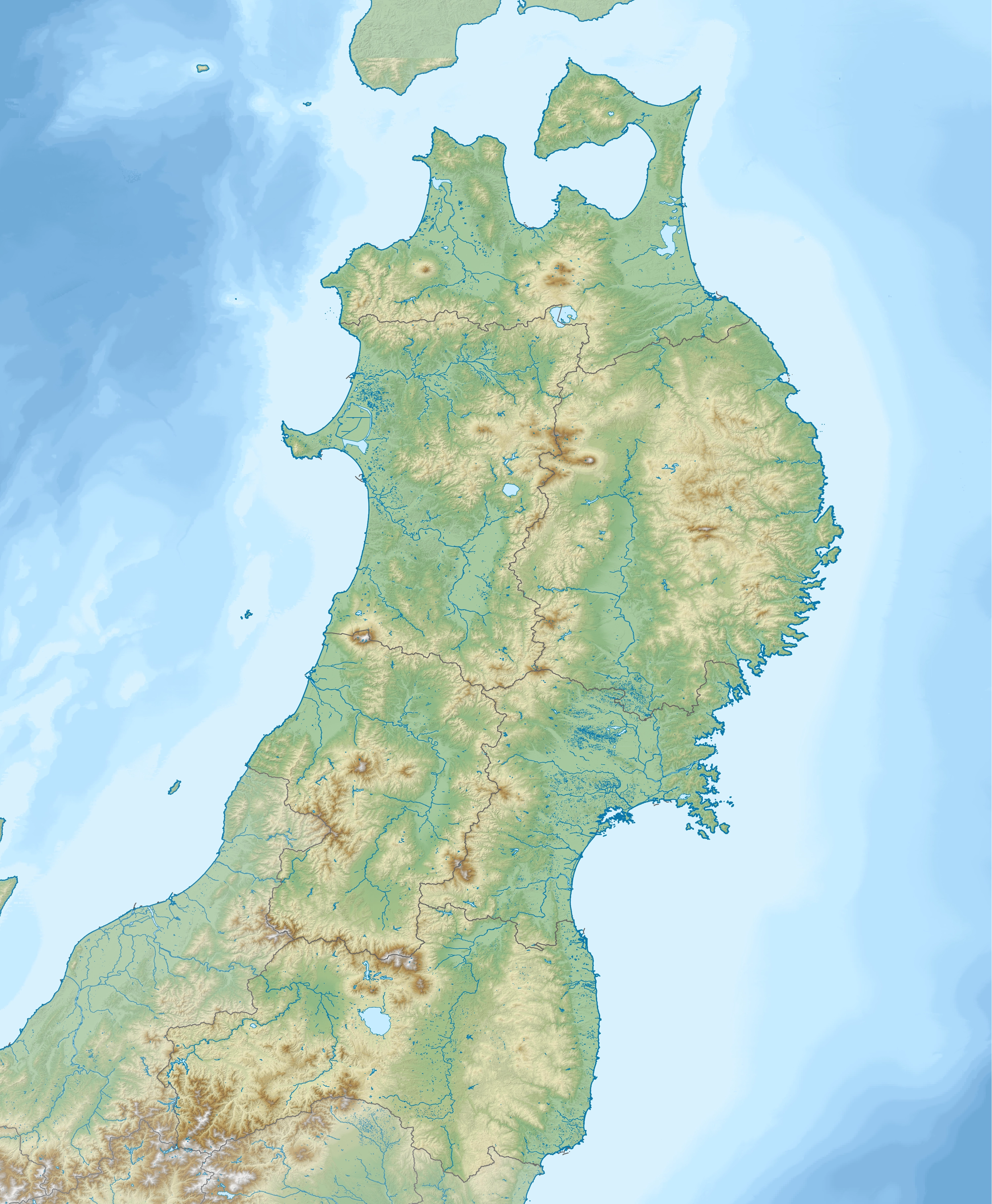
- Location within Tendo, Yamagata Location within Yamagata Prefecture Location within Tohoku, Japan Location within Japan

General information
- Location: 1-4-1 Hitoichi-chō, Tendō, Yamagata Prefecture, Japan
- Coordinates: 38°20′59″N 140°22′15″E
- Opened: October 1988
- Owner: Dewazakura Sake Brewery Corporation

Website
- Official website

Dewazakura Museum of Art (出羽桜美術館, Dewazakura Bijutsukan) opened in Tendō, Yamagata Prefecture, Japan in 1988. Owned and operated by the Dewazakura Sake Brewery Corporation (出羽桜酒造), the collection focuses on traditional Japanese and Korean arts and crafts, including ceramics, paintings, and calligraphy. The museum building dates to the Meiji period.

== See also ==
- List of Cultural Properties of Japan - paintings (Yamagata)
- Homma Museum of Art
- Yamagata Museum of Art
- Hakutsuru Fine Art Museum
