= Sakata City Museum of Art =

- 酒田市美術館
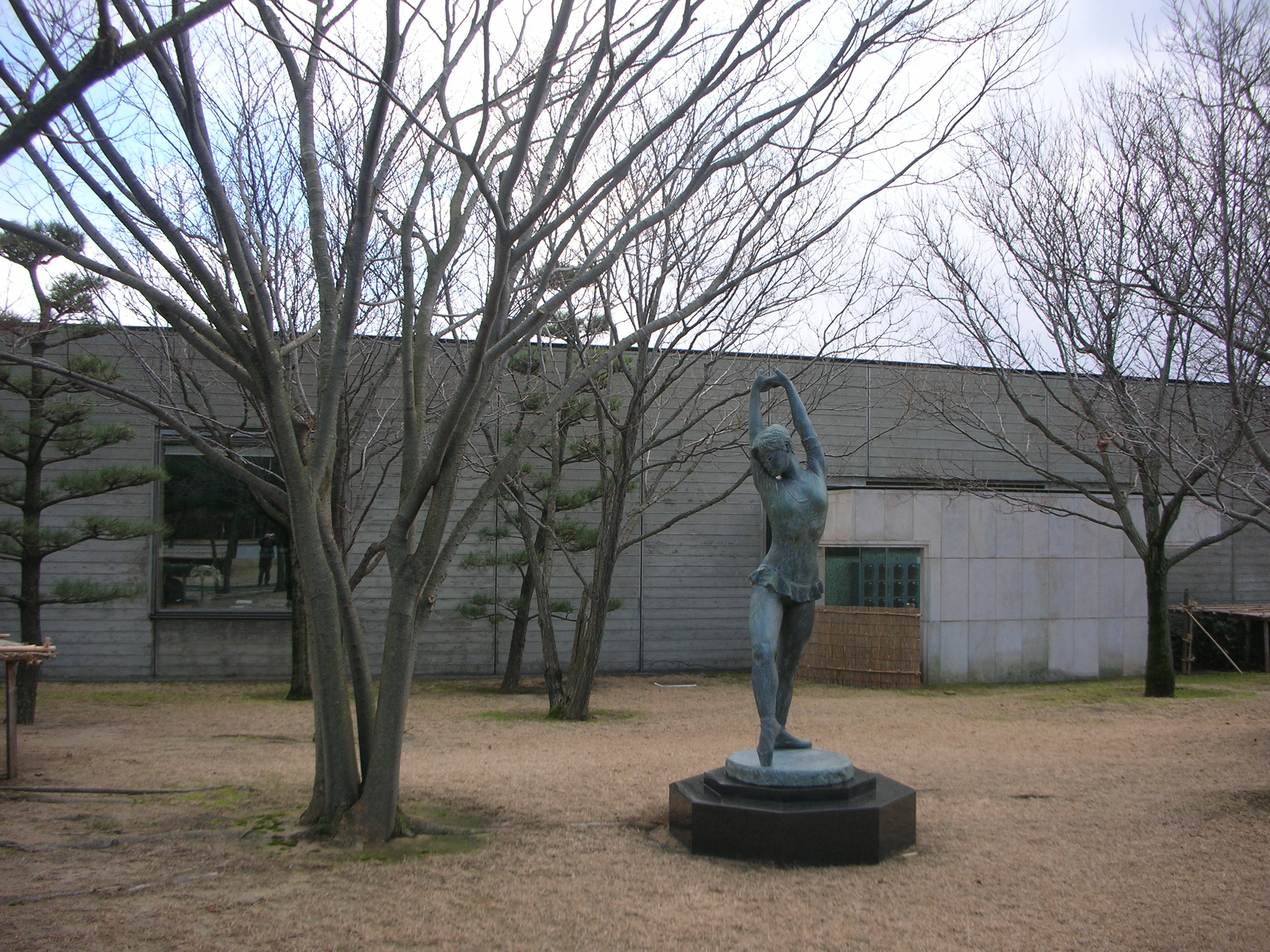

General information
- Location: 3-chōme 17-95 Iimoriyama, Sakata, Yamagata Prefecture, Japan
- Coordinates: 38°53′35″N 139°48′57″E
- Opened: 3 October 1997

Website
- www.sakata-art-museum.jp

Sakata City Museum of Art (酒田市美術館, Sakata-shi Bijutsukan) opened in Sakata, Yamagata Prefecture, Japan in 1997. Located on a small hill with views over the city as well as towards Mount Chōkai and the Mogami River, the collection focuses on works in the western tradition by Japanese artists.

== See also ==
- List of Cultural Properties of Japan - paintings (Yamagata)
- Homma Museum of Art
- Yamagata Museum of Art
