= Yamagin Kenmin Hall =

Concert hall in Yamagata Prefecture, Japan

Yamagin Kenmin Hall やまぎん県民ホール
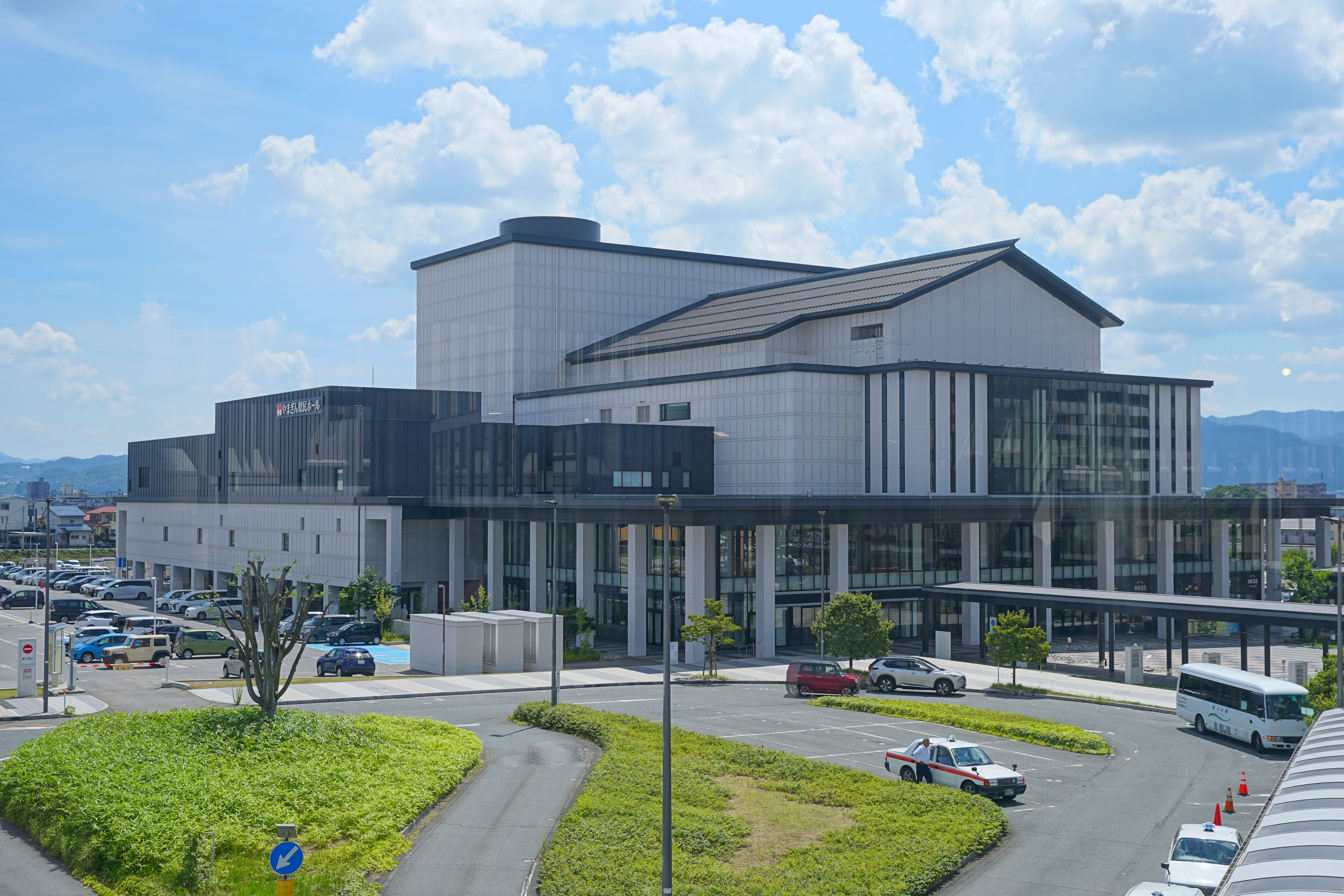
- Alternative names: Yamagata Prefectural Cultural Arts Centre 山形県総合文化芸術館

General information
- Location: 1-2-38 Futaba-chō, Yamagata, Yamagata Prefecture, Japan
- Coordinates: 38°14′53″N 140°19′31″E
- Opened: 12 May 2020

Other information
- Seating capacity: 2,001

Website
- Official website (in Japanese)

Yamagin Kenmin Hall (やまぎん県民ホール, Yamagin Kenmin Hōru), also known as Yamagata Prefectural Cultural Arts Centre (山形県総合文化芸術館, Yamagata-ken Sōgō Bunka Geijutsu-kan), is a concert hall and multi-functional cultural complex that opened in Yamagata, Yamagata Prefecture, Japan in 2020. The main hall has 2,001 seats, making it one of the largest in Tōhoku.

== See also ==
- Yamagata Bank
- Yamagata Terrsa
- Yamagata Symphony Orchestra
- Yamagata Prefectural Museum
- Yamagata Museum of Art
