= Shiba Kōkan =

Japanese artist (1747–1818)

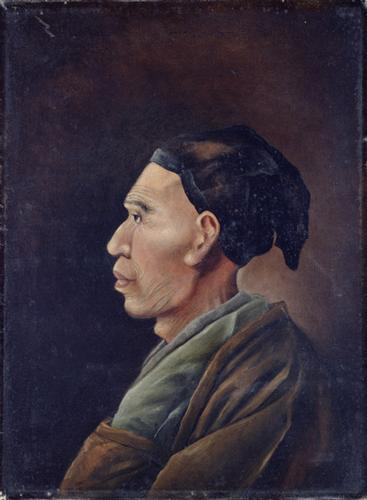
- Portrait of Shiba Kokan by Yuichi Takahashi (1828–1894)
- Born: Andō Kichijirō; 1747; Edo (Tokyo)
- Died: 1818 (aged 70–71); Edo (Tokyo)
- Known for: Ukiyo-e, oil painting, copper engraving
- Movement: Rangaku

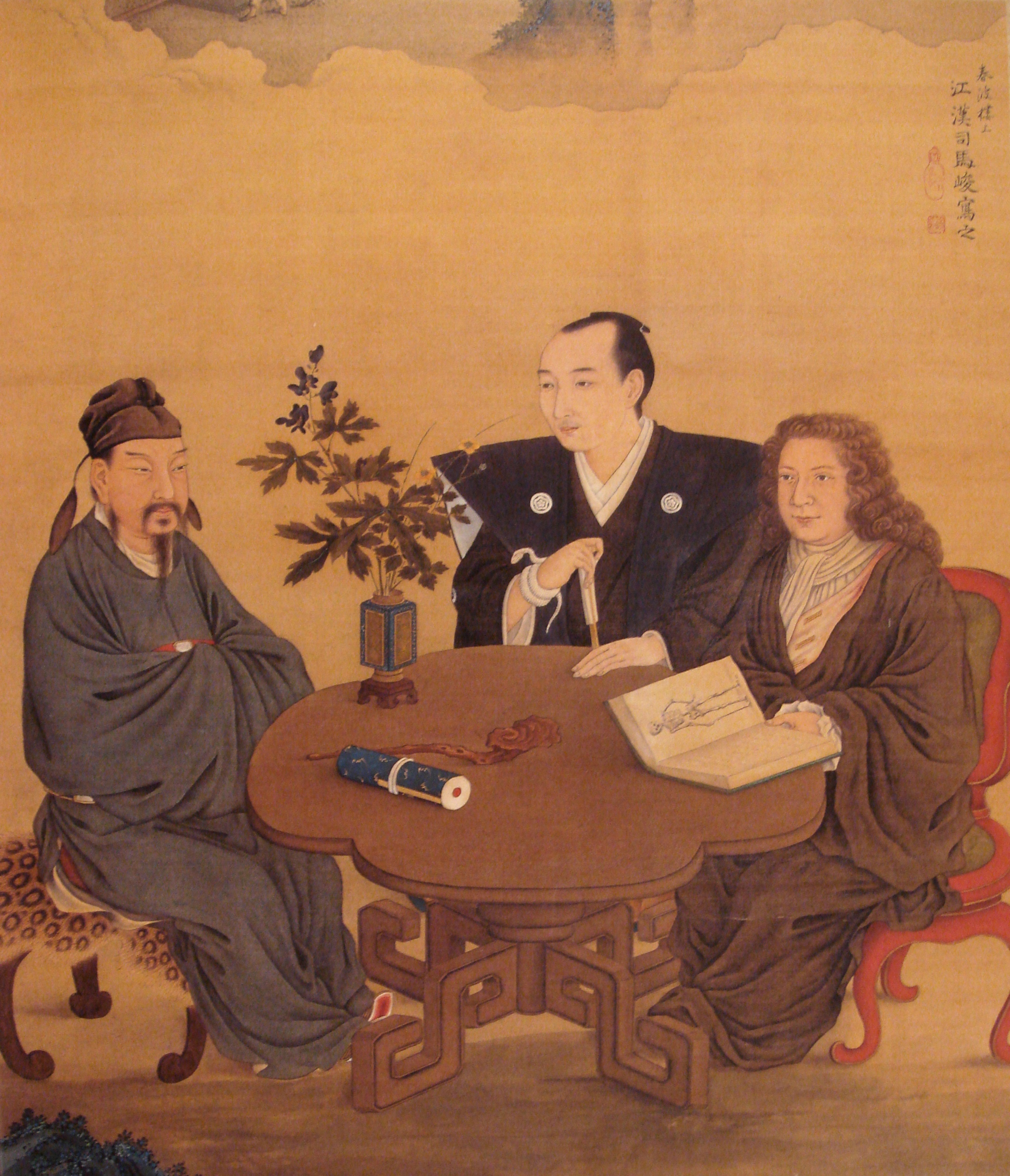
A meeting of Japan, China, and the West, by Shiba Kōkan.

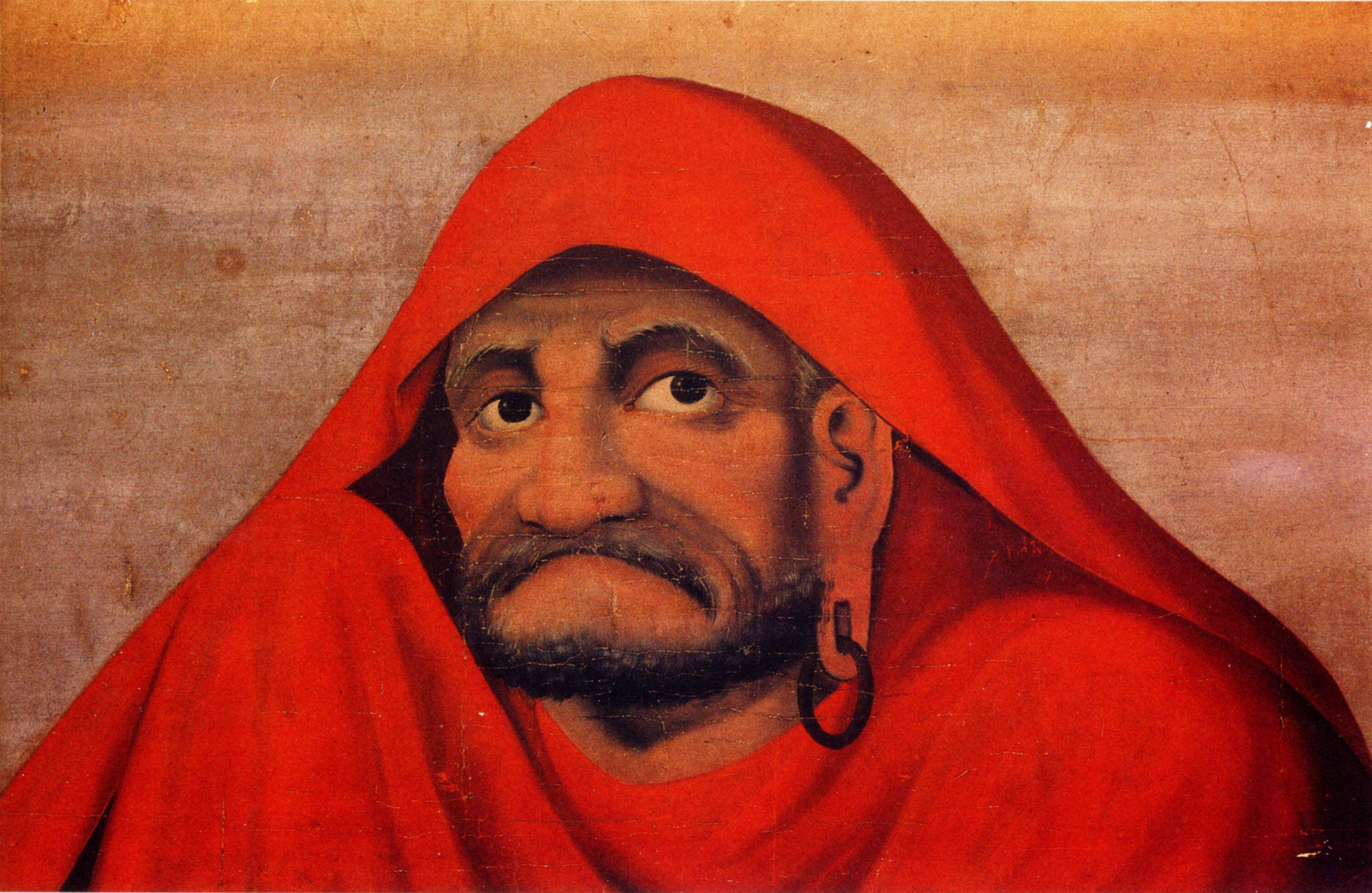
Rakan, by Shiba Kōkan.

Shiba Kōkan (司馬 江漢; 1747 – November 19, 1818), born Andō Kichirō (安藤吉次郎) or Katsusaburō (勝三郎), was a Japanese painter and printmaker of the Edo period, famous both for his Western-style yōga paintings, in imitation of Dutch oil painting styles, methods, and themes, which he painted as Kōkan, and his ukiyo-e prints, which he created under the name Harushige, but also producing forgeries of the works of Suzuki Harunobu. He is said to have boasted of his ability to forge the great master so well. He also was engaged in Western learning (Rangaku) in the field of astronomy. Like many other Edo period artists, Kōkan used a great variety of other names at various points in his career, though "Shiba Kōkan", "Suzuki Harushige", and close variations on those appear far more often. Variations include Shiba Shun (司馬峻) and Suzuki Shun, while his other names include A Fugen-dōjin, Kungaku, Rantei, and as a writer Shumparō (春波楼).

== Early life and training ==
Kōkan started his artistic career at the age of 15 at the Kanō school in Edo, but left the school six years later. He was influenced then by Suzuki Harunobu and Sō Shiseki. In 1773 he met Hiraga Gennai.

== Career ==
Kōkan mastered a number of very different styles, and was also a great innovator, exploring new methods and styles on his own. Following Harunobu's death in 1770, Kōkan placed Harunobu's signature on a number of his own prints, which were supposedly accepted as true works of Harunobu at the time. Today, art historians have noted the distinctive calligraphic style of the faked Harunobu signature, the use of Western-style perspective, and the somewhat less delicate figures in works by "Harunobe" (Kōkan). Although Utagawa Toyoharu's contribution to the introduction of Western-style perspective into ukiyo-e is undisputed, his handling of perspective still showed inaccuracies; it was in fact Kōkan, Toyoharu's contemporary, who as early as 1770 produced genuine linear-perspective prints, both in his forgeries of Harunobu's nishiki-e and in his own designs. He became the first Japanese artist, in 1783, to use copperplate engraving, a print, called View on Mimeguri.

Kōkan, who had contact with the Dutch traders permitted to dock at Nagasaki, is credited with introducing Katsushika Hokusai to Western linear perspective.

== Western learning and cartography ==
Kōkan lived in Edo, was a student of rangaku (Dutch studies) in addition to his pursuits as an artist, and interested in astronomy in particular. He wrote and illustrated a book on Copernicus' theories, entitled Kopperu temmon zukai (刻白爾(コッペル)天文図解, Illustrated Explanation of Copernicus' Astronomy). He met Hendrik Caspar Romberg, the Dutch embassy visiting the Shōgun at Edo, but visited Nagasaki only once, in 1788.

"Shiba Kokan's world map, published in 1792 in two hand-drawn sheets, shows in the surrounding diagrams the Copernicus figures of earth, sun and moon, which his accompanying book explained with more diagrams. Australia is present with an approximation of shape quite unknown to Nagakubo Sekisui; Brazil again stretches eastward in deformity; Japan is at the far east of a sheet, but this is a modern map. The ever-original Shiba Kokan describes himself in the colophon as introducing copper engraving technologies to Japan. Later impressions added considerably to the surrounding decorations, with small scenes of whaling, of hills and harbours and plant dissection; they are also more fully colored, in homage to Willem Blaeu or popular taste. However, Shiba Kokan's spare, early issue still conveys a sense of innovation."

== Gallery ==
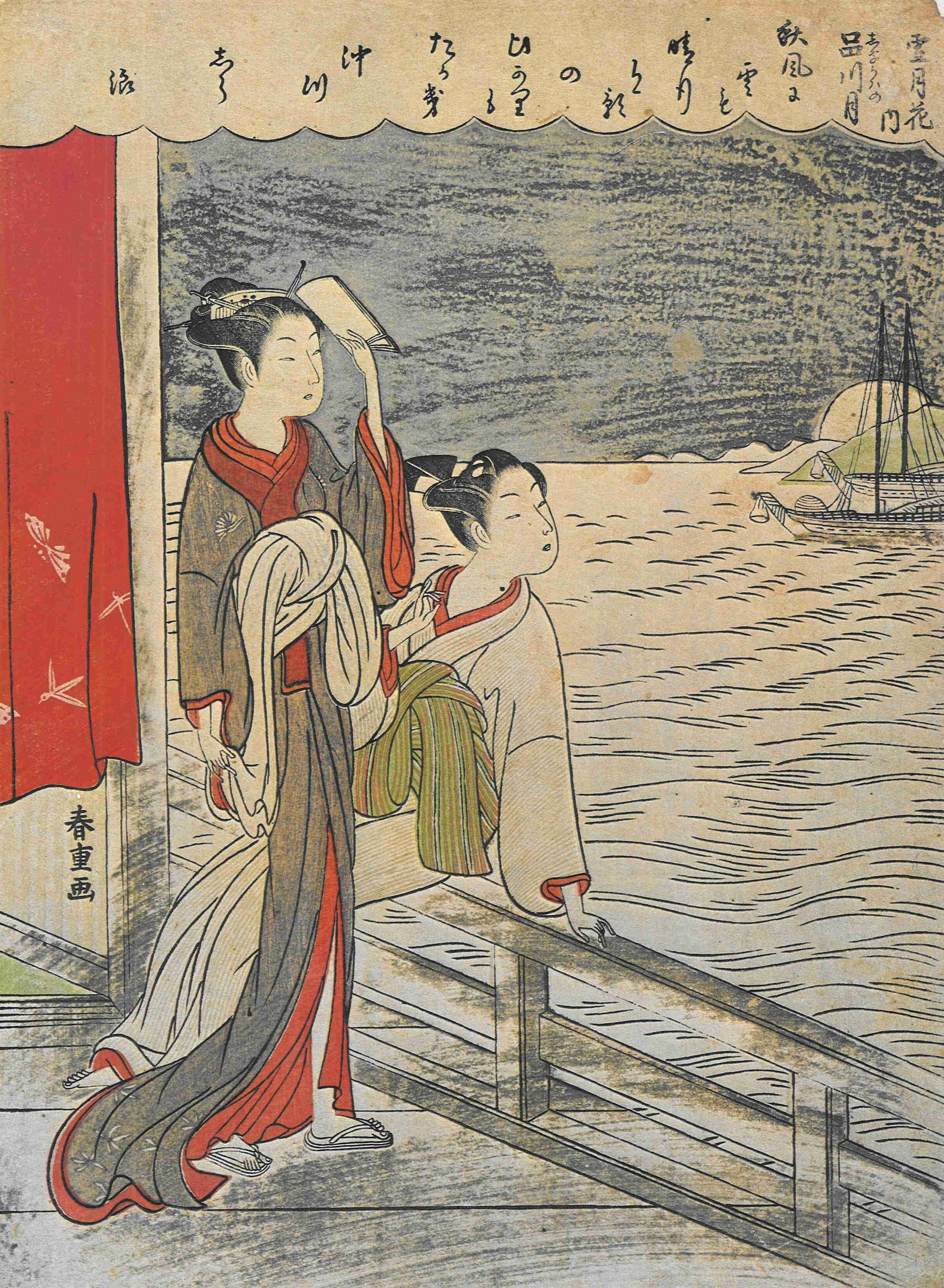
Moon (Note: from the series Snow, Moon and Flowers) above Shinagawa, signed Harushige

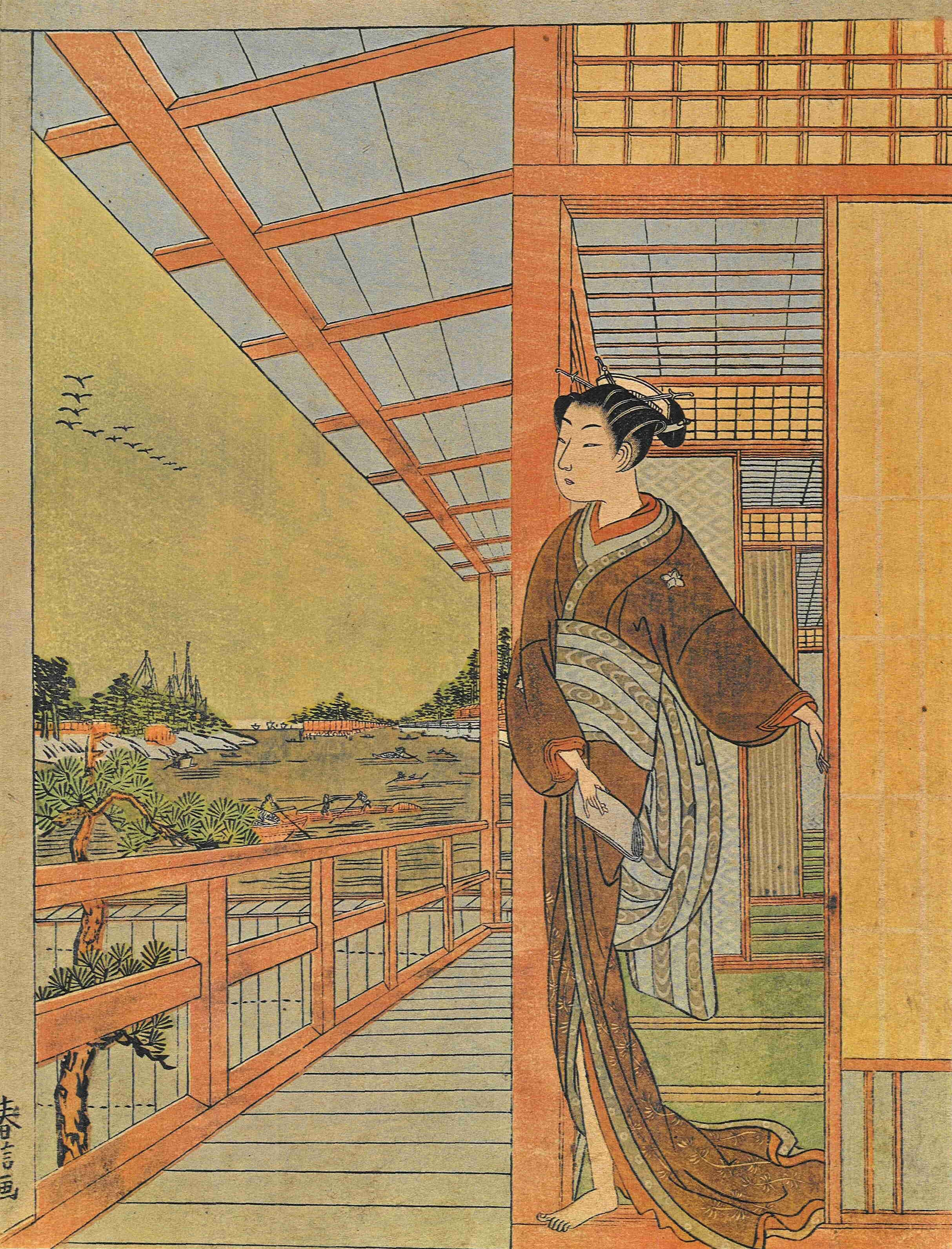
Woman, with faked Harunobu signature

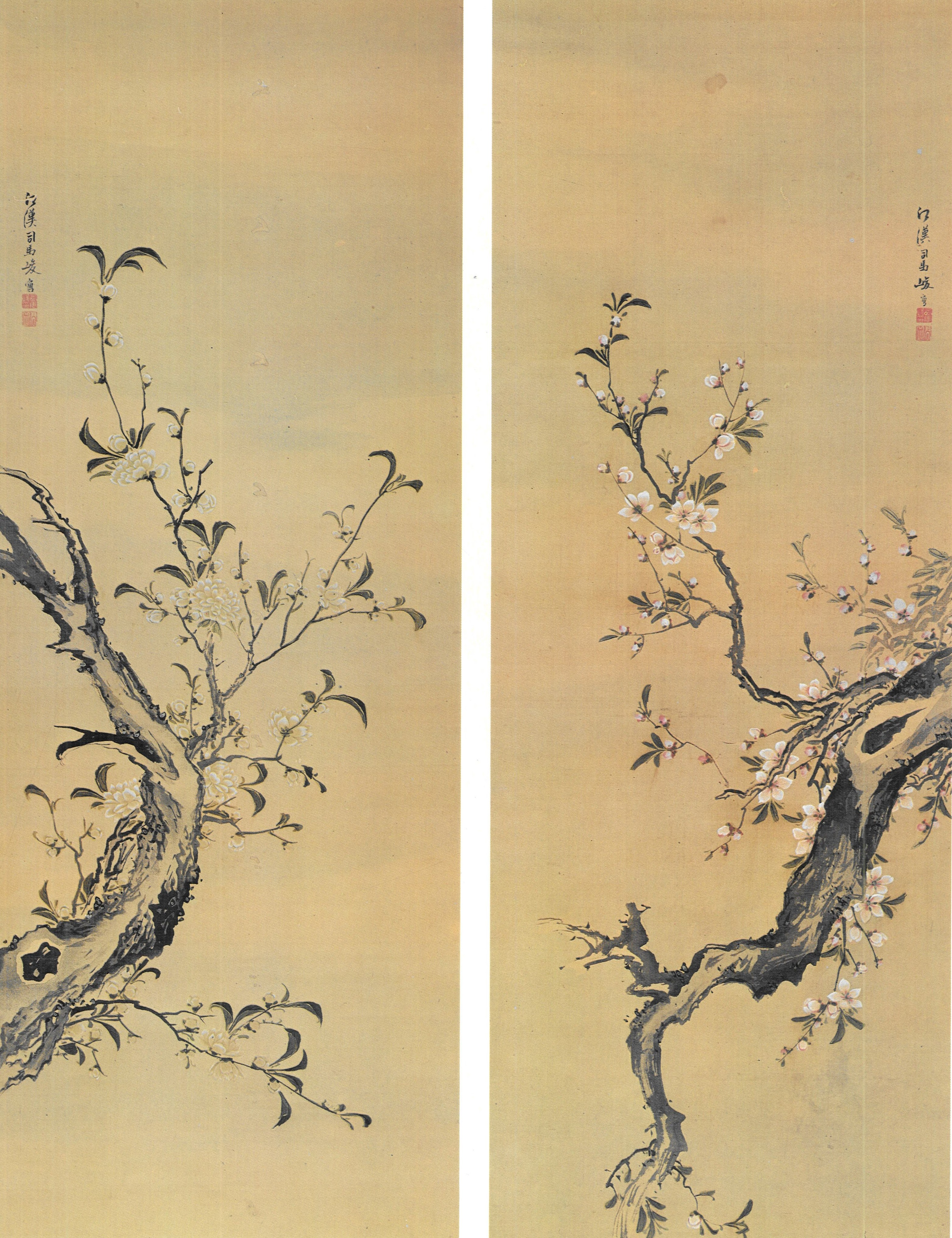
Pair of scrolls in style of Sō Shiseki

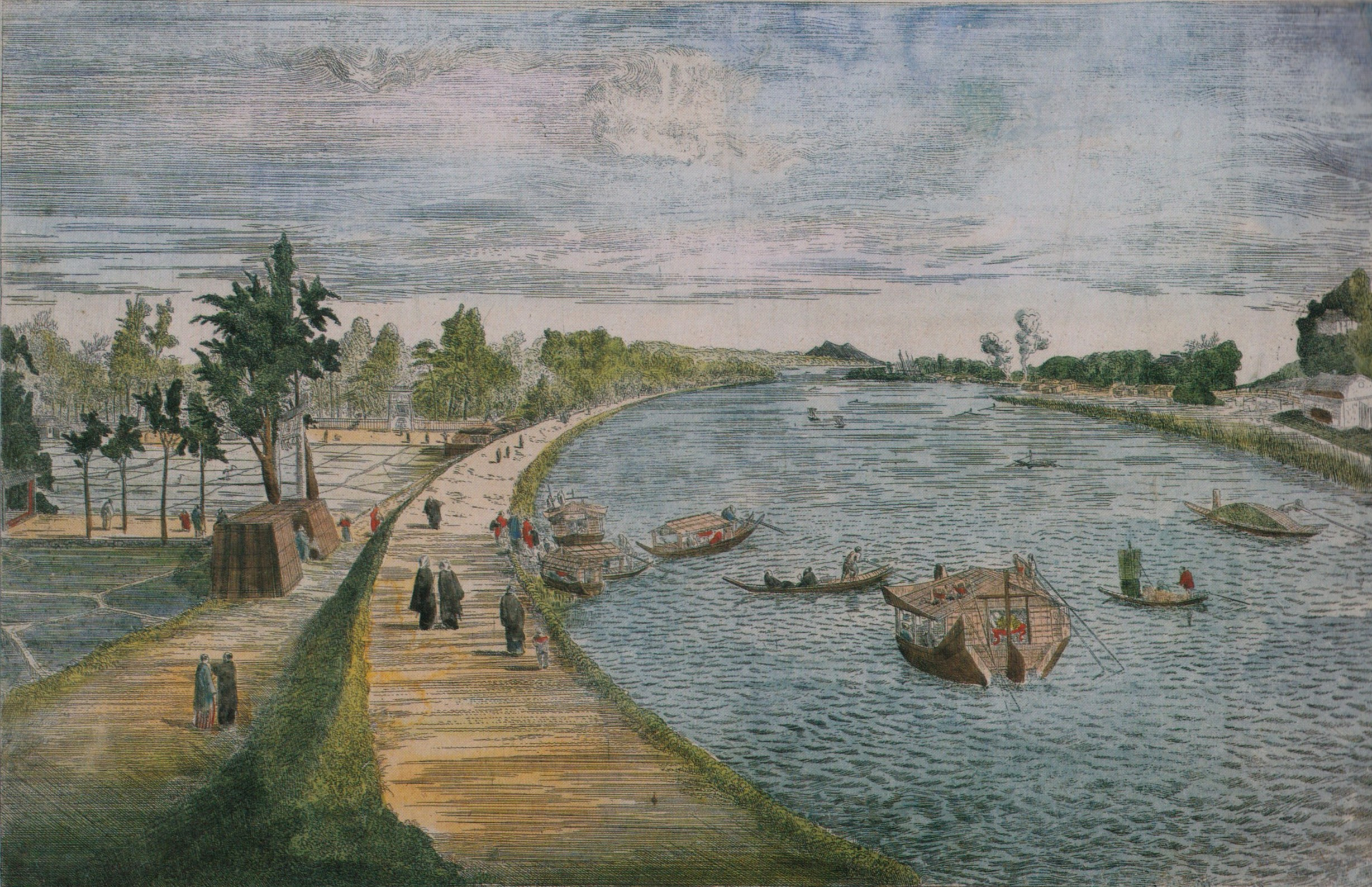
View on Mimeguri; first, copper print by a Japanese, hand coloured

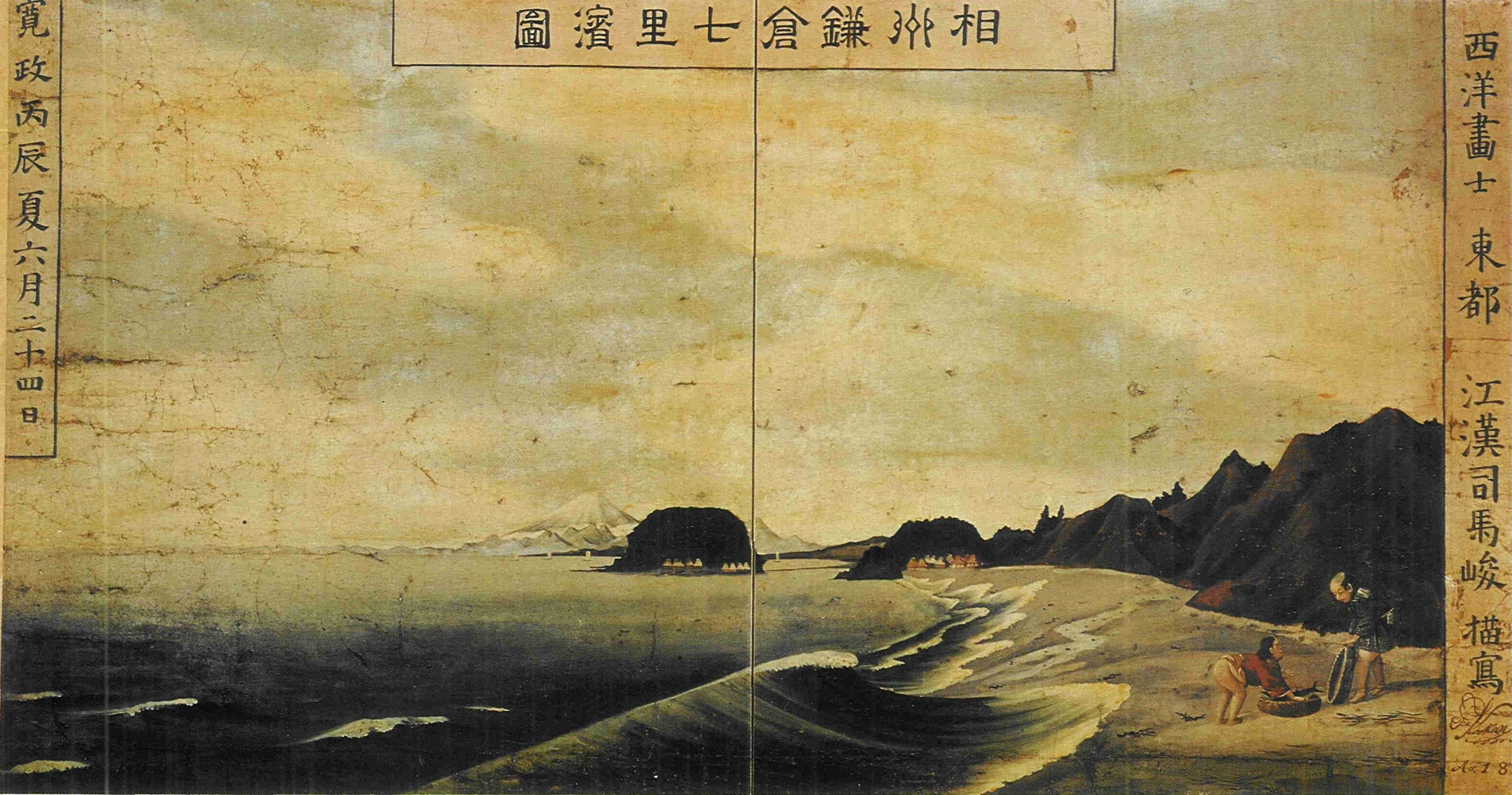
Seven-miles beach with Enoshima and Fuji

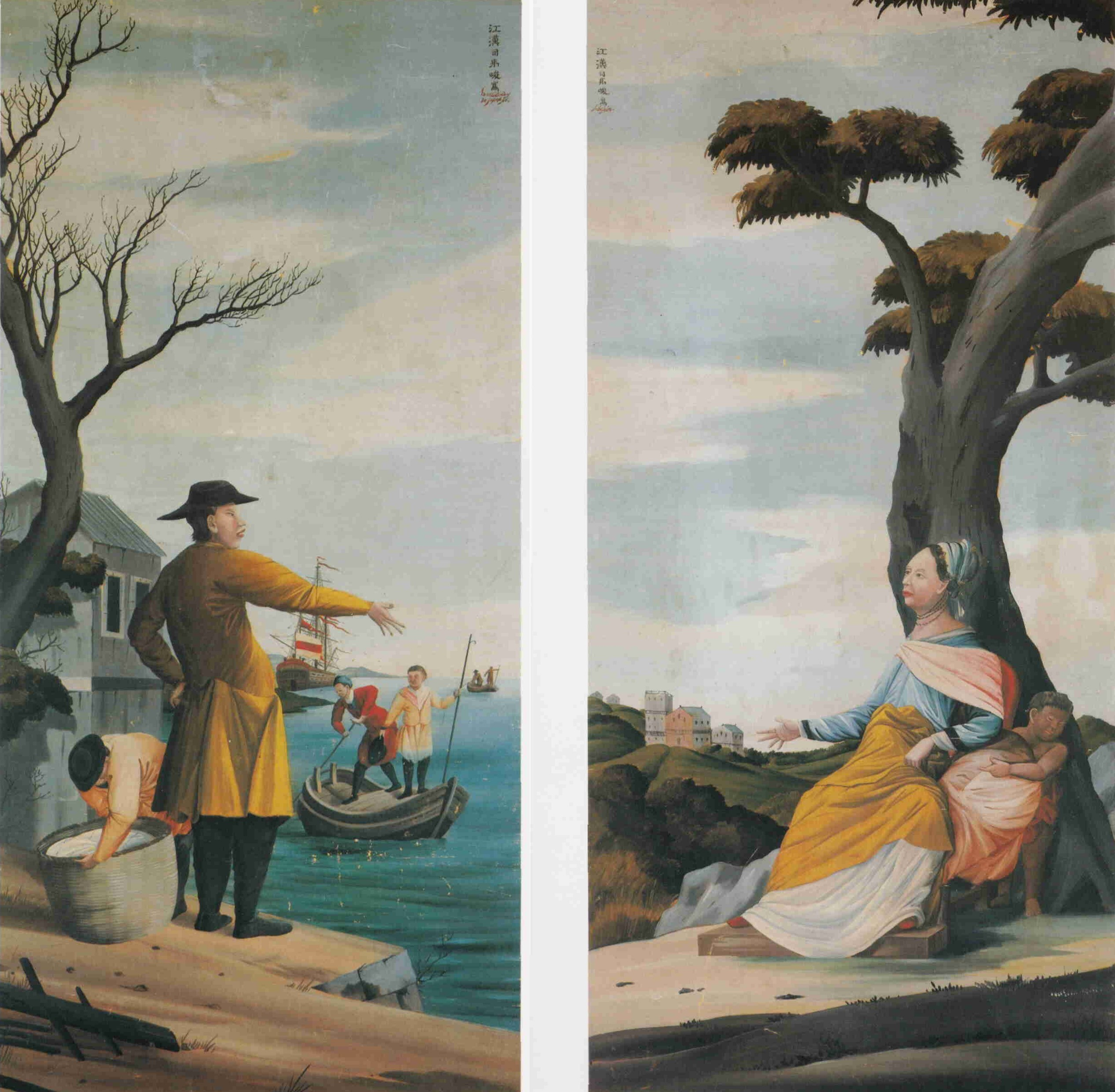
Two oil paintings (Note: Acc. Naruse, prints from the book Het menselyk bedryf by Jan and Caspar Luyken, Amsterdam 1694, were used as models)
(Kōbe City Museum)
