= Yamagata Symphony Orchestra =

- Orchestra
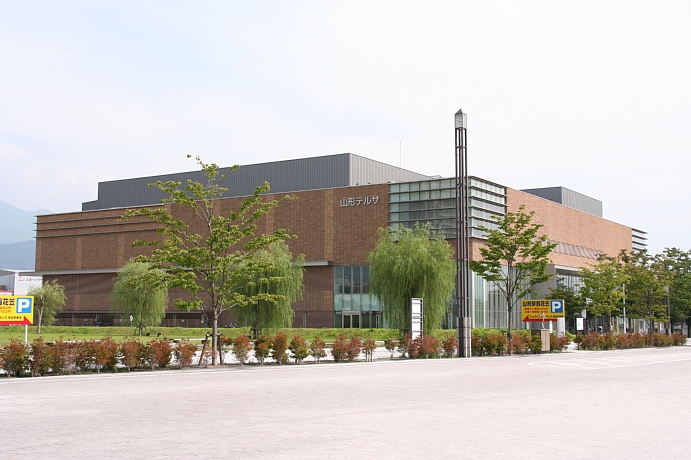
- Yamagata Terrsa
- Native name: 山形交響楽団
- Founded: 1972
- Concert hall: Yamagata Terrsa
- Principal conductor: Tetsurō Ban
- Website: Official website

Yamagata Symphony Orchestra is a Japanese orchestra established in 1972, making it the first professional orchestra to be formed in Tōhoku. It made its Suntory Hall debut in 1987, appeared at the Colorado Music Festival in 1991, and now performs some 150 times a year, at Yamagata Terrsa and Yamagin Kenmin Hall in Yamagata, in Sakata and Tsuruoka, for schools, and at annual "Sakuranbo (Cherry) Concerts" at Tokyo Opera City Concert Hall (since 2003) and in Ōsaka (since 2012). In 2006, the YSO became the first orchestra in Japan to launch its own record label ("YSO live"), and it featured in the 2008 film Departures.

== See also ==
- Orchestra Ensemble Kanazawa
- Yamagata Museum of Art
