= List of cultural properties of Japan – paintings (Yamagata) =

This list is of the cultural properties of Japan designated in the category of paintings (絵画, kaiga) for the Prefecture of Yamagata.

== National Cultural Properties ==
As of 1 July 2019, eight properties have been designated Important Cultural Properties (including one *National Treasure), being of national significance.

Property	Date	Municipality	Ownership	Comments	Image	Dimensions	Coordinates	Ref.
*Scenes in and around the Capital, colours on paper with gold ground, by Kanō Eitoku 紙本金地著色洛中洛外図〈狩野永徳筆／八曲屏風〉 shihon kinji chakushoku rakuchū rakugai zu (Kanō Eitoku hitsu, rokkyoku byōbu)	1562–74	Yonezawa	Yonezawa City Uesugi Museum	pair of six-panel folding screens, given by Oda Nobunaga to Uesugi Kenshin in 1574; the right screen includes a depiction of the Gion Festival		each screen 3.633 metres (11 ft 11.0 in) by 1.594 metres (5 ft 2.8 in)	37°54′27″N 140°06′24″E	
Amida Triad, colours on silk 絹本著色阿弥陀三尊像 kenpon chakushoku Amida sanzon zō	1309	Yonezawa	Uesugi Jinja (上杉神社)	Goryeo Buddhist paintings; three scrolls, with Amida Nyorai in the centre flanked by Kannon and Seishi		each scroll 148 centimetres (4 ft 10 in) by 77 centimetres (2 ft 6 in)	37°54′33″N 140°06′15″E	
Wang Zhaojun, colours on silk, by Hishida Shunsō 絹本著色王昭君図〈菱田春草筆／〉 kenpon chakushoku Ō Shōkun zu (Hishida Shunsō hitsu)	1902	Tsuruoka	Zenpō-ji (善宝寺) (kept at Chidō Museum)	harem scene with the celebrated Han beauty		3.70 metres (12 ft 2 in) by 1.68 metres (5 ft 6 in)	38°46′22″N 139°46′01″E	
Bishamonten, colours on silk 絹本著色毘沙門天像 kenpon chakushoku Bishamonten zō	end of the Heian period	Yonezawa	Uesugi Jinja (上杉神社)	1 hanging scroll; the painting once hung in the Bishamon-dō of Kasugayama Castle		109 centimetres (3 ft 7 in) by 44.6 centimetres (1 ft 5.6 in)	37°54′33″N 140°06′15″E	
Oku no Hosomichi, light colours on paper, by Yosa Buson 紙本淡彩奥の細道図〈与謝蕪村筆／安永八年の年記がある〉 shihon tansai Oku no Hosomichi zu (Yosa Buson hitsu)	1779	Yamagata	Yamagata Museum of Art	six-panel folding screen with the entire text of Matsuo Bashō's haibun		3.490 metres (11 ft 5.4 in) by 1.393 metres (4 ft 6.8 in)	38°15′21″N 140°19′57″E	
Ippen, colours on paper 紙本著色遊行上人絵〈伝狩野宗秀筆／〉 shihon chakushoku Yūgyō shōnin e (den-Kanō Sōshū hitsu)	1594	Yamagata	Kōmyō-ji (光明寺) (kept at Nara National Museum)	ten handscrolls traditionally attributed to Kanō Sōshū (狩野宗秀)		170 metres (557 ft 9 in) by 33.6 centimetres (1 ft 1.2 in)	34°41′01″N 135°50′12″E	
Mandala of the Two Realms, gold paint on violet paper 紫綾金泥両界曼荼羅図 shiryō kindei ryōkai mandara zu	Heian period	Yonezawa	Uesugi Jinja (上杉神社)	pair of hanging scrolls presented to the shrine by the Uesugi clan during the Meiji period; formerly kept at the family temple on Mount Kōya		Diamond Realm Mandala: 108 centimetres (3 ft 7 in) by 88 centimetres (2 ft 11 in); Womb Realm Mandala: 107 centimetres (3 ft 6 in) by 87.8 centimetres (2 ft 10.6 in)	37°54′33″N 140°06′15″E	
Sacred horse, wooden panel, by Kōnome Sadoshige 板絵著色神馬図〈郷目貞繁筆／〉 ita-e chakushoku shinme zu (Kōnome Sadoshige hitsu)	1563	Tendō	Jakushō-ji (若松寺)	ema formed of five wooden boards		182.5 centimetres (5 ft 11.9 in) by 163 centimetres (5 ft 4 in)	38°21′46″N 140°25′08″E	

== Prefectural Cultural Properties ==
As of 2 November 2018, seventy-seven properties have been designated at a prefectural level.

Property	Date	Municipality	Ownership	Comments	Image	Dimensions	Coordinates	Ref.
Shellfish-gathering at Shinagawa Gotenyama; Distant View of Nori-gathering at Okuyama near Nihon Kaian-ji light colours on silk, by Andō Hiroshige 絹本淡彩 御殿山品川汐干狩図 日本海晏寺奥山海苔取遠望図 安藤広重筆 kenpon tansai Gotenyama Shinagawa shiohi gari zu Nihon Kaianji Okuyama nori-tori enbō zu (Andō Hiroshige hitsu)	C19	Tendō	private	pair of scrolls		90.4 centimetres (2 ft 11.6 in) by 30.1 centimetres (11.9 in)	38°21′02″N 140°19′02″E	
Tsukuda-jima Sumiyoshi in Tōkyō; Arashiyama in Kyōto; Beach by the Light of the Rising Moon at Naniwa Sumiyoshi light colours on silk, by Andō Hiroshige 絹本淡彩 東都佃島住よし図 京都嵐山図 浪花住吉月出見の浜図 安藤広重筆 kenpon tansai Tō-to Tsukuda-jima Sumiyoshi zu Kyōto Arashiyama zu Naniwa Sumiyoshi tsuki de mi no hama zu (Andō Hiroshige hitsu)	C19	Yamagata	Jikōmyō-in (慈光明院)	three scrolls		92.0 centimetres (3 ft 0.2 in) by 28.9 centimetres (11.4 in)	38°15′16″N 140°20′16″E	
Landscape, light colours on silk, by Yo Shakuya 絹本淡彩山水図 余夙夜筆 kenpon tansai sansui zu Yo Shakuya hitsu	1796	Sakata	Homma Museum of Art			114.0 centimetres (3 ft 8.9 in) by 35.0 centimetres (1 ft 1.8 in)	38°55′24″N 139°50′32″E	
Aizen Myōō, colours on silk 絹本著色愛染明王像 kenpon chakushoku Aizen Myōō zō	late Kamakura period	Sagae	Hōzō-in (宝蔵院)			82.9 centimetres (2 ft 8.6 in) by 48.2 centimetres (1 ft 7.0 in)	38°24′39″N 140°15′05″E	
Farewell to Sonehara Rokei, ink on paper, by Fukuhara Gogaku 紙本墨画曽根原魯卿叙別図 福原五岳筆 shihon bokuga Sonehara Rokei jobetsu zu Fukuhara Gogaku hitsu	C18	Sakata	Homma Museum of Art			75.8 centimetres (2 ft 5.8 in) by 27.2 centimetres (10.7 in)	38°55′24″N 139°50′32″E	
Twin moons, ink on paper, by Shōkadō Shōjō 紙本墨画対月図 松花堂昭乗筆 江月賛 shihon bokuga taigetsu no zu Shōkadō Shōjō hitsu Kōgestu san	early C17	Yamagata	private	seated monk with comments or san (賛) by Kōgetsu Sōgan (江月宗玩); inscription reads 黒月則隠白月則現江月叟書之		111.0 centimetres (3 ft 7.7 in) by 26.0 centimetres (10.2 in)	38°15′21″N 140°20′13″E	
Landscape with people, flowers, and fruit, light colours on paper, six-fold screen, by Ike no Taiga 紙本墨画淡彩山水人物花果図 池大雅筆 六曲屏風 shihon bokuga tansai sansui jinbutsu kaka zu Ike no Taiga hitsu rokkyoku byōbu	1771	Sagae	private			351 centimetres (11 ft 6 in) by 147 centimetres (4 ft 10 in)	38°22′47″N 140°16′52″E	
Daruma, ink on paper 紙本墨画達磨図 無款 shihon bokuga Daruma zu mukan	Muromachi period	Kahoku	private			66.0 centimetres (2 ft 2.0 in) by 29.0 centimetres (11.4 in)	38°25′29″N 140°18′55″E	
Swallow in flight, ink on paper, by Kō Saidō 紙本墨画飛燕図 康西堂筆 shihon bokuga hien zu Kō Saidō hitsu	C15	Sakata	private			42.6 centimetres (1 ft 4.8 in) by 31.2 centimetres (1 ft 0.3 in)	38°55′05″N 139°50′41″E	
Fuke Zenji, ink on paper, by Seta Kamon 紙本墨画普化禅師像 瀬田掃部筆 雲居禅師賛 shihon bokuga Fuke Zenji zō Seta Kamon hitsu Unkyo Zenji san	C16/17	Sakata	private	with comments or san (賛) by Ungo Kiyo (雲居希膺) (1582-1659)		75.7 centimetres (2 ft 5.8 in) by 21.3 centimetres (8.4 in)	38°55′05″N 139°50′41″E	
Grapes and squirrel, ink on paper, by Miyamoto Musashi 紙本墨画葡萄栗鼠図 宮本武蔵筆 shihon bokuga budō risu zu Miyamoto Musashiō hitsu	C17	Tendō	Dewazakura Museum of Art			126.5 centimetres (4 ft 1.8 in) by 46.5 centimetres (1 ft 6.3 in)	38°20′59″N 140°22′15″E	
Landscape in the beiten style, ink on paper, by Okada Hankō 紙本墨画米点山水図 岡田半江筆 shihon bokuga beiten sansui zu Okada Hankō hitsu	1830	Yamagata	Yamagata Museum of Art			134.8 centimetres (4 ft 5.1 in) by 38.2 centimetres (1 ft 3.0 in)	38°15′21″N 140°19′57″E	
Landscape in the beihō style, ink on paper, by Okada Hankō 紙本墨画米法山水図 岡田半江筆 shihon bokuga beihō sansui zu Okada Hankō hitsu	early C19	Sakata	Homma Museum of Art			227.0 centimetres (7 ft 5.4 in) by 46.8 centimetres (1 ft 6.4 in)	38°55′24″N 139°50′32″E	
Hōnen, ink on paper, by Reizei Tamachika 紙本墨画法然上人像 冷泉為恭筆 shihon bokuga Hōnen shōnin-zō Reizei Tamachika hitsu	mid-C19	Ōishida	private			92.3 centimetres (3 ft 0.3 in) by 29.5 centimetres (11.6 in)	38°35′38″N 140°22′22″E	
Pasturing cattle, ink on paper 紙本墨画牧牛図 無款 shihon bokuga bokugyū-zu mukan	C14	Sakata	private	thought to be of Yuan origin		50.0 centimetres (1 ft 7.7 in) by 29.5 centimetres (11.6 in)	38°54′23″N 139°50′07″E	
Bamboo, ink on paper, by Yanagisawa Kien 紙本墨画墨竹図 柳里恭筆 shihon bokuga bokuchiku-zu Ryūrikō hitsu	C18	Sakata	private			111.5 centimetres (3 ft 7.9 in) by 27.0 centimetres (10.6 in)	38°54′22″N 139°50′30″E	
Daruma, ink on paper, by Kaihō Yūshō 紙本墨画面壁達磨図 海北友松筆 shihon bokuga menpeki Daruma-zu Kaihō Yūshō hitsu	C16/17	Sakata	private (kept at Homma Museum of Art)			104.0 centimetres (3 ft 4.9 in) by 39.0 centimetres (1 ft 3.4 in)	38°55′24″N 139°50′32″E	
Goose among reeds, ink on paper by Kōnome Sadashige 紙本墨画芦雁図 郷目貞繁筆 shihon bokuga rogan-zu Kōnome Sadashige hitsu	mid-C16	Kahoku	private			58.2 centimetres (1 ft 10.9 in) by 44.5 centimetres (1 ft 5.5 in)	38°23′41″N 140°18′35″E	
Views of Yamagata City, oil painting by Takahashi Yuichi 油彩山形市街図 高橋由一筆 yusai Yamagata-shi gai-zu (Takahashi Yuichi hitsu)	1885	Yamagata	Yamagata Prefecture (kept at Yamagata Museum of Art)	in 1881 and 1884 Takahashi Yuichi was commissioned by Mishima Michitsune to paint scenes of public works in Yamagata Prefecture; in the centre is the Yamagata Prefecture Office of 1877, on the right a school and the police headquarters, and on the left a museum		151.1 centimetres (4 ft 11.5 in) by 104.4 centimetres (3 ft 5.1 in)	38°15′21″N 140°19′57″E	

== Municipal Cultural Properties ==
Properties designated at a municipal level include:

Property	Date	Municipality	Ownership	Comments	Image	Dimensions	Coordinates	Ref.
Jizō with the Ten Kings of Hell 地蔵十王図; Jizō jūō zu	C14	Sagae	Kezō-in (華蔵院)	Goryeo Buddhist painting		115.2 centimetres (3 ft 9.4 in) by 59.1 centimetres (1 ft 11.3 in)	38°24′37″N 140°15′07″E	
Mount Fuji, byōbu, by Takeuchi Seihō 竹内棲鳳筆 冨士図 六曲屏風; Takeuchi Seihō hitsu Fuji zu rokkyoku byōbu	late C19	Sakata	Homma Museum of Art	pair of six-fold screens			38°55′24″N 139°50′32″E	
Peonies, by Takahashi Sōhei 高橋草坪筆 牡丹図; Takahashi Sōhei hitsu botan zu	C19	Sakata	private					
Copperplate Landscapes, by Shiba Kōkan 司馬江漢筆 銅版風景図; Shiba Kōkan hitsu dōban fūkei zu	Edo period	Sakata	Homma Museum of Art	seven prints			38°55′24″N 139°50′32″E	
American Ship, by Honma Hokuyō 本間北曜筆 アメリカ船図; Honma Hokuyō hitsu Amerika-fune zu	1853	Sakata	Homma Museum of Art	from Perry's first visit			38°55′24″N 139°50′32″E	
Four Asleep, by Nagasawa Rosetsu 長沢芦雪筆 四睡図; Nagasawa Rosetsu hitsu shi-sui zu	C18	Sakata	Homma Museum of Art	the four sleeping figures are Hanshan, Shide, Fenggan, and a tiger			38°55′24″N 139°50′32″E	
Figures of Foreigners, emakimono, by Ohara Keizan 小原慶山筆 異人形容図巻; Ohara Keizan hitsu Ijin keiyō zu maki	C18	Sakata	Homma Museum of Art				38°55′24″N 139°50′32″E	
Tao Yuanming, by Maruyama Ōkyo 円山応挙筆 五柳先生図; Maruyama Ōkyo hitsu Goryū Sensei zu	C18	Sakata						
Mañjuśrī in the Clouds, by Kanō Tsunenobu 狩野常信筆 雲中文殊之図; Kanō Tsunenobu hitsu kumo naka Monju no zu	early Edo period	Sakata						
Broom, by Yosa Buson 與謝蕪村筆 箒図; Yosa Buson hitsu hōki zu	C18	Sakata						
Hotei, by Itō Jakuchū 伊藤若冲筆 布袋図; Itō Jakuchū hitsu Hotei zu	C18	Sakata	Homma Museum of Art				38°55′24″N 139°50′32″E	
Fierce Tiger, by Ganku 岸駒筆 猛虎図; Ganku hitsu mōko zu	Edo period	Sakata	Homma Museum of Art				38°55′24″N 139°50′32″E	
Fishing-Folk, by Watanabe Kazan 渡辺崋山筆 漁民図 画賛; Watanabe Kazan hitsu Gyomin zu gasan	C19	Sakata						
Revenge of the Loyal Samurai of Akō, by Yasuda Raishū 安田雷洲筆 赤穂義士復讐図; Yasuda Raishū hitsu Akō gishi fukushū zu	C19	Sakata	Homma Museum of Art	iconography borrowed from the Adoration of the Shepherds			38°55′24″N 139°50′32″E	
Sakata Sannō Festival, byōbu, by Igarashi Unrei 五十嵐雲嶺筆 酒田山王例祭図 六曲屏風; Igarashi Unrei hitsu Sakata Sannō reisai rokkyoku byōbu	1851	Sakata	private	pair of six-fold screens (detail pictured)				
Salted Salmon, by Ikeda Kametarō 池田亀太郎筆 塩鮭図; Ikeda Kametarō hitsu shiozake zu	C19/20	Sakata	Sakata City Museum of Art	cf. Takahashi Yuichi			38°53′35″N 139°48′57″E	
Distant View of Matsuyama Castle, by Tanaka Seikyo 松山城遠望図 田中静居筆; Matsuyama-jō enbō zu Tanaka Seikyo hitsu	C19	Sakata						

== See also ==
- Cultural Properties of Japan
- List of National Treasures of Japan (paintings)
- Japanese painting
- List of Historic Sites of Japan (Yamagata)
