= Jan Luyken =

Dutch engraver (1649–1712)

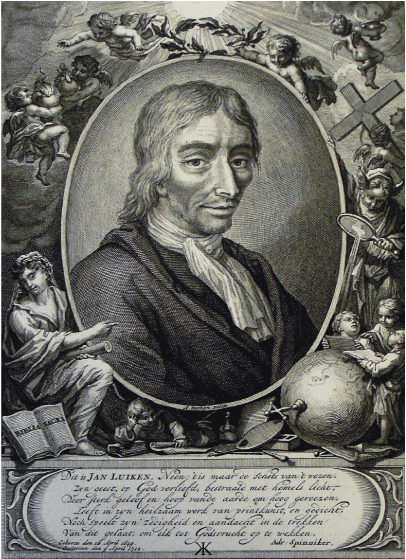
Jan Luyken from the Bowyer Bible

Johannes or Jan Luyken (16 April 1649 – 5 April 1712) was a Dutch poet, illustrator, and engraver.

== Biography ==
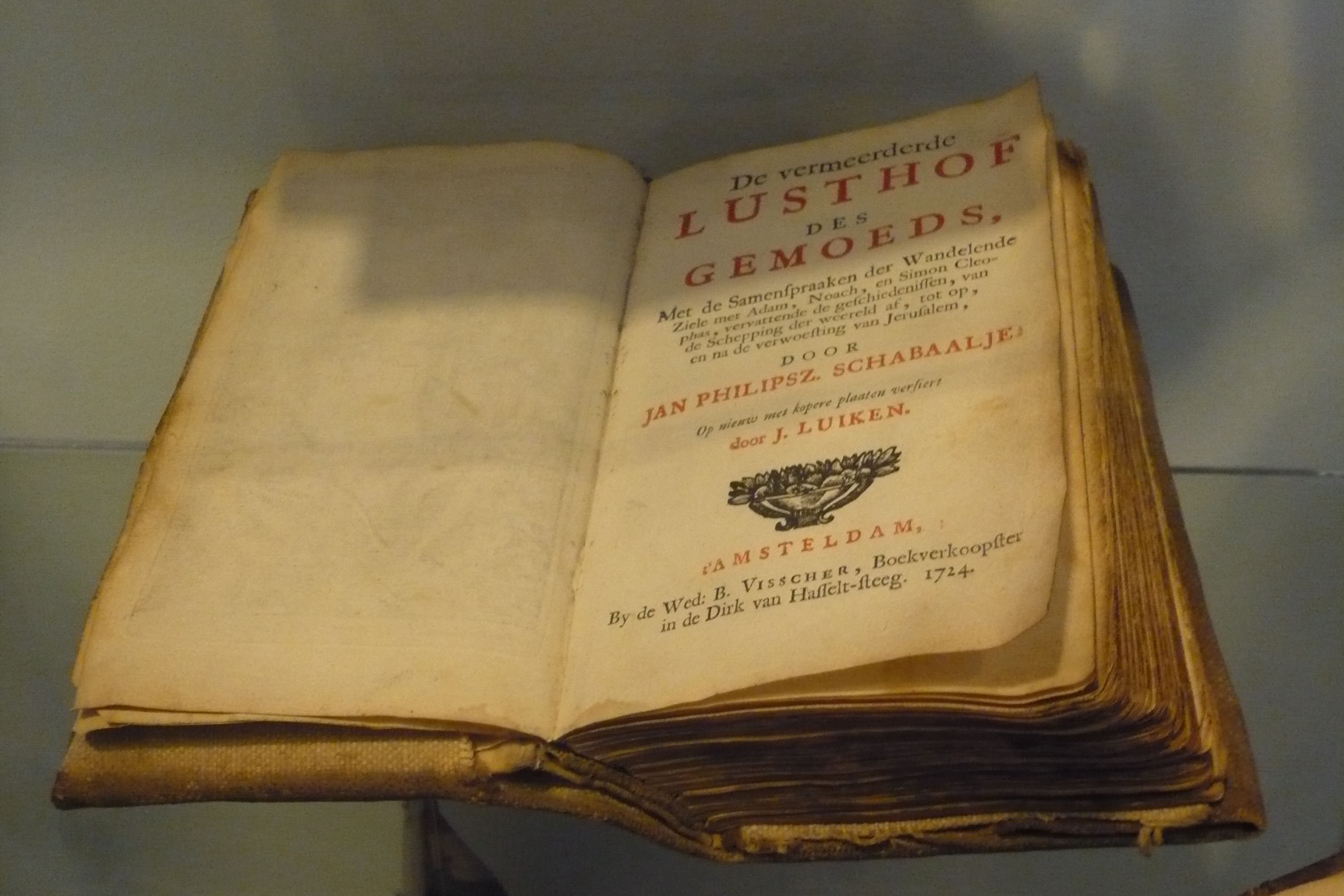
Jan Luiken made the engravings for the popular "sailor's bible" called "Lusthof des Gemoeds", by Jan Philipsz Schabaalje, 1714

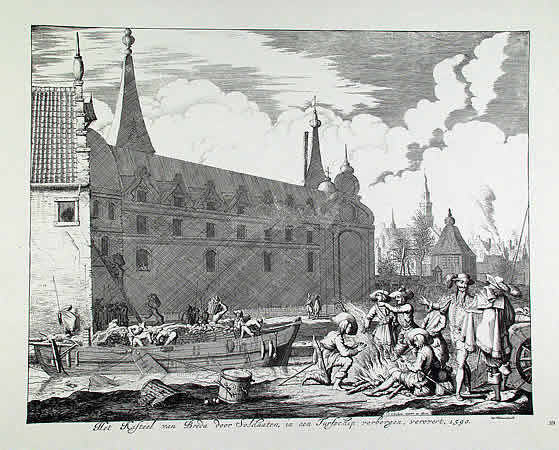
Jan Luyken's print of the peat boat used as a ruse by the Dutch to gain possession of Breda from the Spanish in 1590

He was born and died in Amsterdam, where he learned engraving from his father Kaspar Luyken. He was a child prodigy.

Luyken married at 19 and had several children, including renowned engraver Caspar Luyken. At age 26, Luyken converted to the Mennonite church, which inspired him to write moralistic poetry.

== Works ==
Luyken illustrated the 1685 edition of the Martyrs Mirror with 104 copper etchings. Thirty of these plates survive and were part of The Mirror of the Martyrs exhibit.

He also published Het Menselyk Bedryf ("The Book of Trades") in 1694, which contains numerous engravings of 17th-century trades by Luiken and his son Caspar (Caspaares).

== Cultural references ==
Joris-Karl Huysmans' anti-hero Des Esseintes in À rebours was an admirer of Luyken's engravings and had prints from his Religious Persecutions hung in his boudoir. He described them as "a collection of appalling plates displaying all the tortures which religious fanaticism has invented." Des Esseintes was enthralled not just by Luyken's graphic depictions, but also his ability to reconstruct times and places in his works.

== Gallery ==
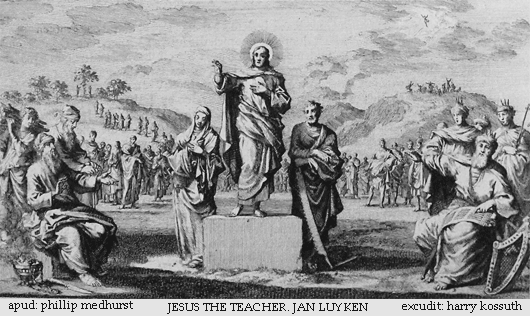
Jesus the Teacher

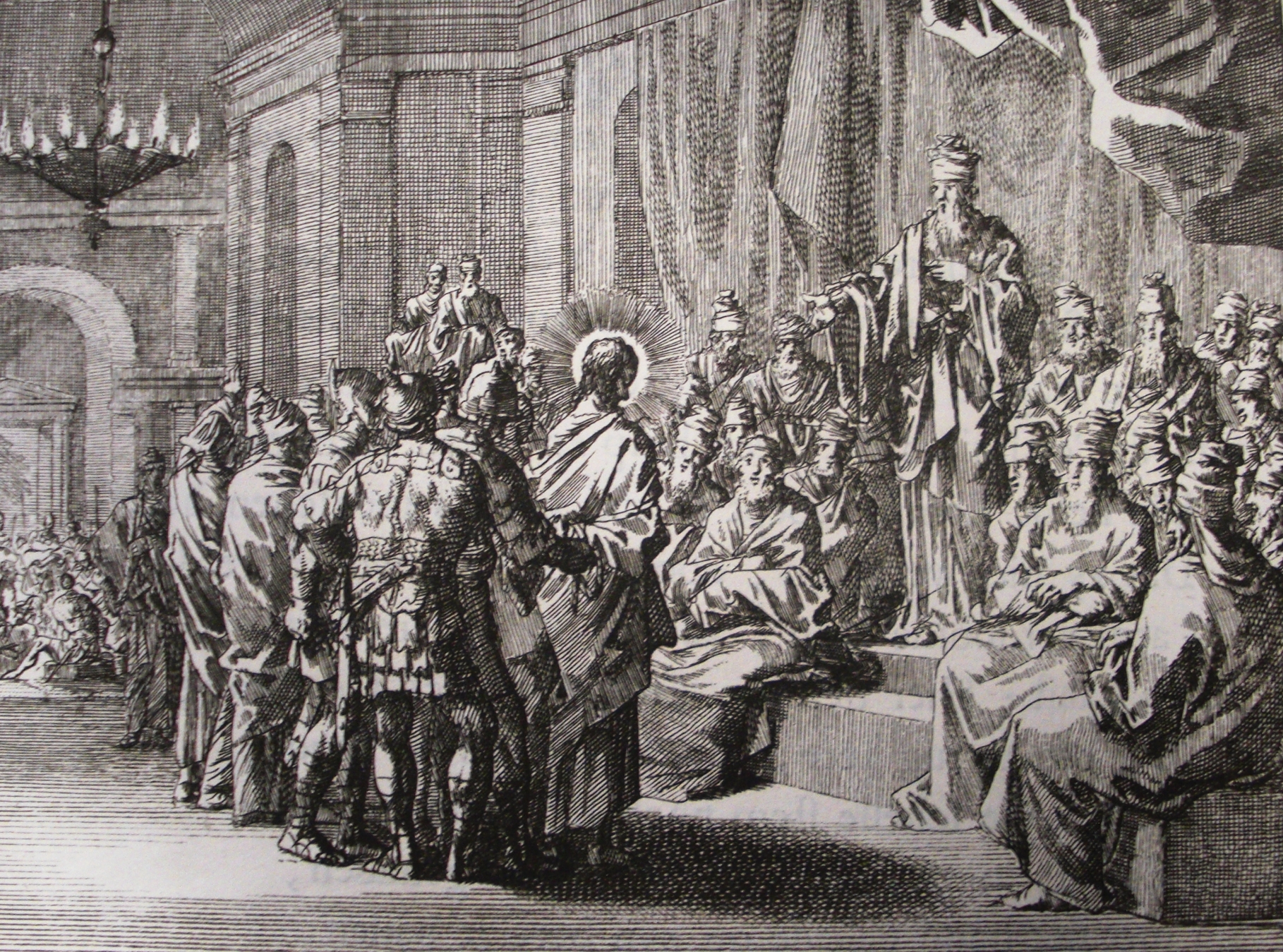
Caiaphas

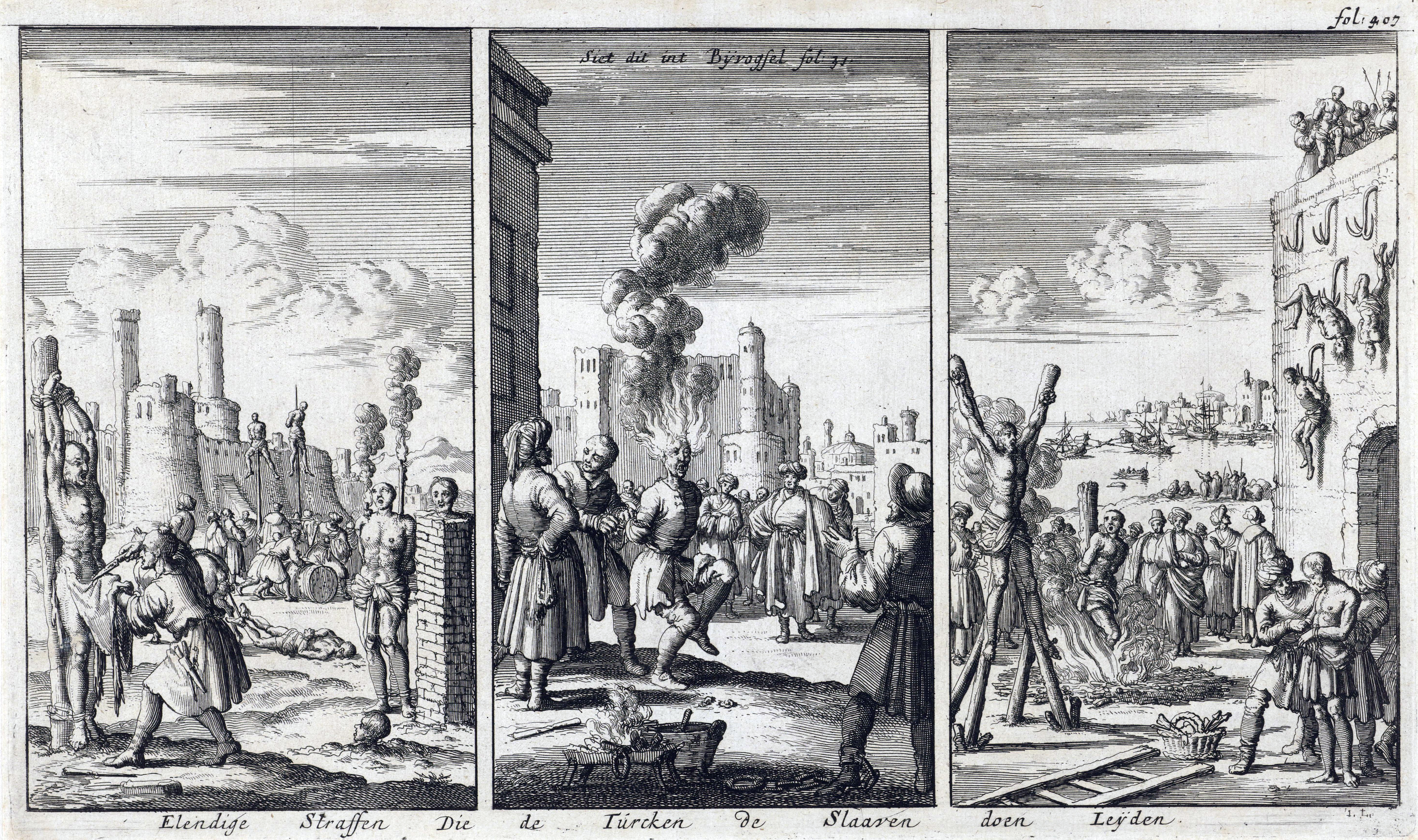
Serious mistreatment of Christian slaves by the Turks

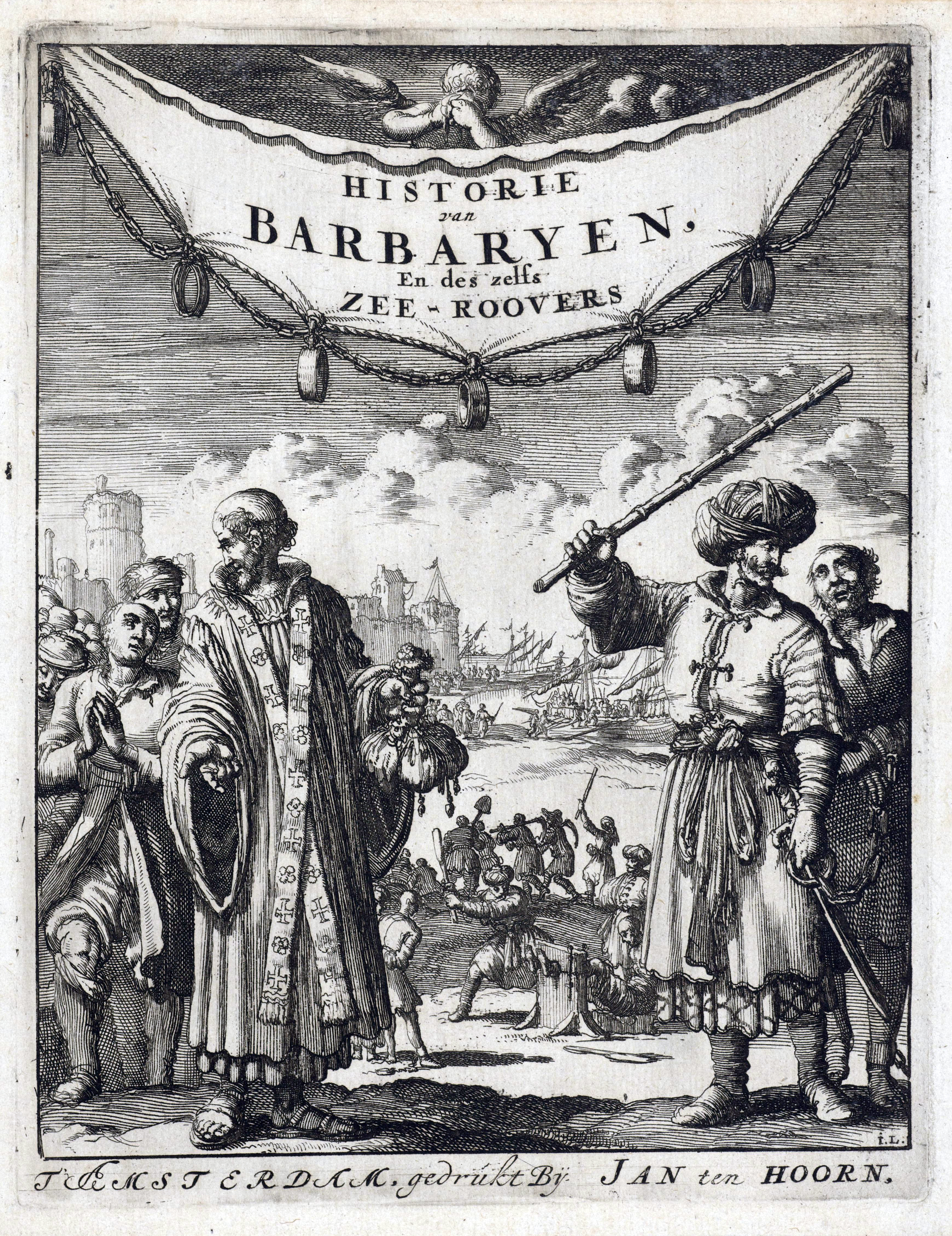
Turk and clergyman with Christian slaves (1684)

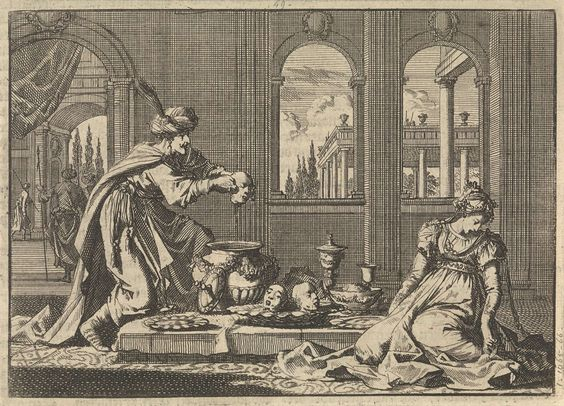
The Cruelty of Shah Safi (1697)

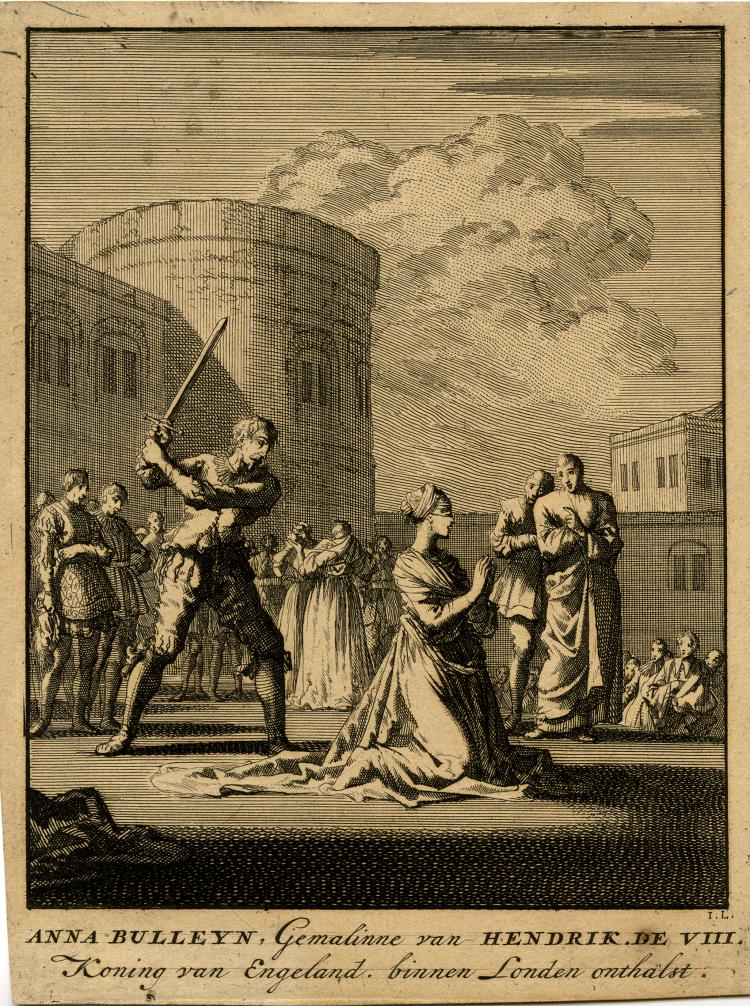
Anne Boleyn's Execution

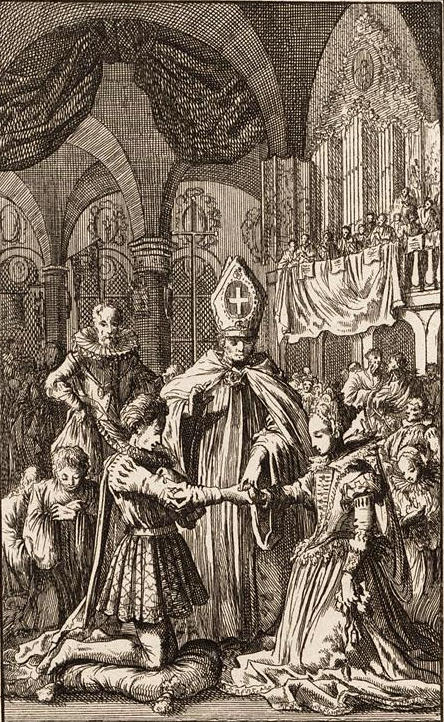
Alexander Farnese marries Maria Princess of Portugal (1720)
