= Caspar Luyken =

Dutch illustrator and engraver (1672–1708)

Caspar Luyken (18 December 1672 – 4 October 1708) was a Dutch illustrator and engraver. He was the son of Jan Luyken, with whom he collaborated extensively.

Luyken worked mostly in Amsterdam and produced Het Menselyk Bedryf ("The Book of Trades") with his father in 1694.

In 1699, he moved to Nuremberg to work with Christoph Weigel the Elder. He stayed there until 1705. He published his Gallery of Late 17th-century Costume there in 1703. In 1708, Jan and Caspar Luyken illustrated Weigel's Historiae Celebriores Veteris Testamenti Iconibus Representatae.
