= Het Menselyk Bedryf ("The Book of Trades") =

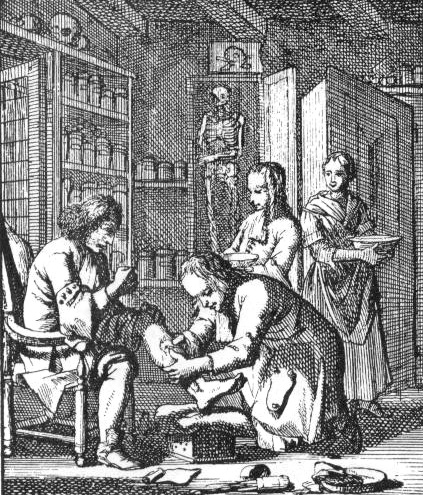
Surgery in Amsterdam (ca. 1690)

Het Menselyk Bedryf ("The Book of Trades") is an emblem book of 100 engravings by Jan Luyken and his son Caspar published in 1694, illustrating various trades in Amsterdam during the Dutch Golden Age. The majority of the trades shown are from the textile industry (12), followed by marine pursuits (8). The book follows the moralist contemporary style of the then hugely popular emblem books of Jacob Cats, containing a moralistic poem per trade.

== Trade titles by page number ==
- 1 Baker – Backer
- 2 Tailor – Kleermaker
- 3 Carpenter – Timmerman
- 4 Bricklayer – Metselaar
- 5 Glazier – Glasemaaker
- 6 Plumber – Lootgieter
- 7 Cabinet-maker – Schrijnwerker
- 8 Brush-maker – Schuyermaaker
- 9 Broom-maker – Beesemmaaker
- 10 Basket-maker – Mandemaaker
- 11 Sieve maker – Seevemaaker
- 12 Chair-maker – Stoelemaaker
- 13 Spinner (thread twister) – Gaarentwynder
- 14 Silk maker – Syreeder
- 15 Wool-dresser – Wolbereider
- 16 Weaver – Weever
- 17 Cloth-shearer – Droogscheerder
- 18 Dyer – Veruwer
- 19 Shoemaker – Schoenmaaker
- 20 Comb maker – Kammemaaker
- 21 Optician – Brillemaaker
- 22 Needle maker – Naaldemaaker
- 23 Pin-maker – Speldemaaker
- 24 Gold-wire drawer – Gouddraadtrecker
- 25 Bronze-founder – Geelgieter
- 26 Tin-founder – Tinnegieter
- 27 Scales maker – Balansemaaker
- 28 Smith – Smit
- 29 Coppersmith – Kooperslaager
- 30 Lantern-maker – Lantaarenmaaker
- 31 Cutler – Messemaaker
- 32 Armourer – Swaardveeger
- 33 Gunsmith – Roeremaaker
- 34 Skate-maker – Schaatsemaaker
- 35 Pole-maker – Boommaaker
- 36 Cannon-maker – Pompemaaker
- 37 Ship's carpenter – Scheepstimmerman
- 38 Rope maker – Lyndraaier
- 39 Sail-maker – Seilemaaker
- 40 Cooper – Kuiper
- 41 Oil-maker – Olislaager
- 42 Candle-maker – Kaarsemaaker
- 43 Butcher – Vleeshouwer
- 44 Pastry-chef – Pasteibacker
- 45 Confectioner (Sugar manufacture) – Suikerbacker
- 46 Apothecary – Apotheeker
- 47 Gardener (Horticulturist) – Hovenier
- 48 Miller – Moolenaar
- 49 Brewer – Brouwer
- 50 Grocer – Grutter
- 51 Wagonwright – Waagemaaker
- 52 Saddler – Saalemaaker
- 53 Bellows-maker – Blaasbalckemaaker
- 54 Turner – Draaier
- 55 Instrument-maker – Instrumentmaaker
- 56 Barber-surgeon – Chirurgyn
- 57 Wig-maker – Pruikemaaker
- 58 Hatter – Hoedemaaker
- 59 Tanner – Leerbereider
- 60 Paper maker – Papiermaaker
- 61 Book-printer – Boeckdrucker
- 62 Copperplate printer – Plaatdrucker
- 63 Bookbinder – Boeckbinder
- 64 Schoolmaster – Schoolmeester
- 65 Clockmaker – Orlosimaaker
- 66 Mirror-maker – Spiegelmaaker
- 67 Glass-blower – Glasblaaser
- 68 Bleacher (for linen and wool) – Bleeker
- 69 Stone-sawyer – Steensager
- 70 Stonemason – Steenhouwer
- 71 Brick-maker – Tichgellaar
- 72 Potter – Pottebacker
- 73 Glue maker (for furniture and sizing) – Lymmaaker
- 74 Peat-cutter – Veender
- 75 Miner – Bergwercker
- 76 Minter (coin maker) – Munter
- 77 Goldbeater – Goudslager
- 78 Silversmith – Silversmit
- 79 Goldsmith – Goudsmit
- 80 Diamond-cutter – Diamantslyper
- 81 Pearl hole-maker – Peerelgaater
- 82 Embroiderer – Borduurder
- 83 Tapestry-maker – Tapeitwerker
- 84 Painter – Schilder
- 85 Engraver – Plaatsnyder
- 86 Sculptor – Beeldhouwer
- 87 Musician – Musikant
- 88 Astrologer – Astrologist
- 89 Lawyer – Advokaat
- 90 Chemist – Scheider
- 91 Doctor (Physician) – Docter
- 92 Teacher (Preacher) – Leeraar
- 93 Farmer (Landowner) – Landman
- 94 Sailor – Zeeman
- 95 Fisherman – Visser
- 96 Hunter – Jaager
- 97 Merchant (Banker) – Koopman
- 98 Soldier (Officer) – Krygsman
- 99 Ruler (Prince) – Heerscher
- 100 Grave-digger – Doodgraaver
