= Homma Museum of Art =

Museum in Yamagata Prefecture, Japan

- 本間美術館
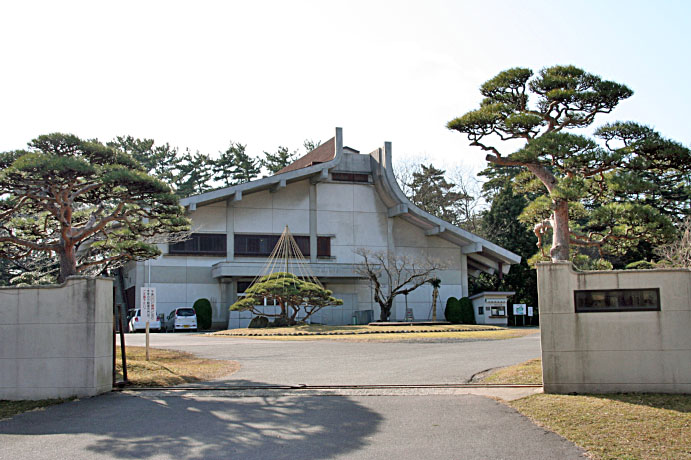

General information
- Location: 7-7 Onari-chō, Sakata, Yamagata Prefecture, Japan
- Coordinates: 38°55′24″N 139°50′32″E
- Opened: 1947

Website
- www.homma-museum.or.jp

Homma Museum of Art (本間美術館, Homma bijutsukan) opened in Sakata, Yamagata Prefecture, Japan, in 1947.

== Setting ==
The Seienkaku (清遠閣) residence was built in 1813 by the fourth head of the Homma family (本間氏), Junji Homma, who was a noted collector of Japanese swords and chairman of the Nihon Bijutsu Token Hozon Kyokai. The Homma family was one of the great merchant houses of Sakata during the Edo Period, growing rich on the kitamaebune coastal trade and by moneylending. During the Meiji period, they were one of then largest landowners in the Tohoku region of Japan. The Seienkaku villa was built as a secondary residence and guest house. Visitors include members of the Sakai and Uesugi clans, former daimyō of the Shōnai and Yonezawa Domains, as well as in 1925 the future Shōwa emperor. A second story was added to the wooden building in 1908 in advance of a planned visit by the future Taishō emperor. It was opened as an art museum from 1947, and a modern annex was added in 1968.

== Collection ==
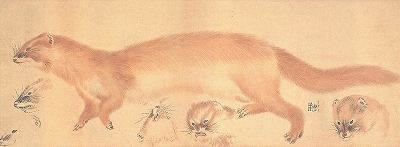
Weasels (鼬図), attributed to Maruyama Ōkyo

The collection of some 2,500 objects includes a Kamakura-period edition of Ise Monogatari and three other Important Cultural Properties, works by Kanō Tan'yū, Nagasawa Rosetsu, Itō Jakuchū, Shiba Kōkan, Matsumura Goshun, Okada Hankō, Kishi Ganku, Kita Genki (喜多元規), Fukuhara Gogaku (福原五岳), Minagawa Kien (皆川淇園), Yasuda Raishū (安田雷洲), and Kuroda Seiki, as well as Goryeo celadons, raku ware by Chōjirō, lacquerware, sculptures, and Japanese traditional dolls.

== Kakubu-en gardens ==
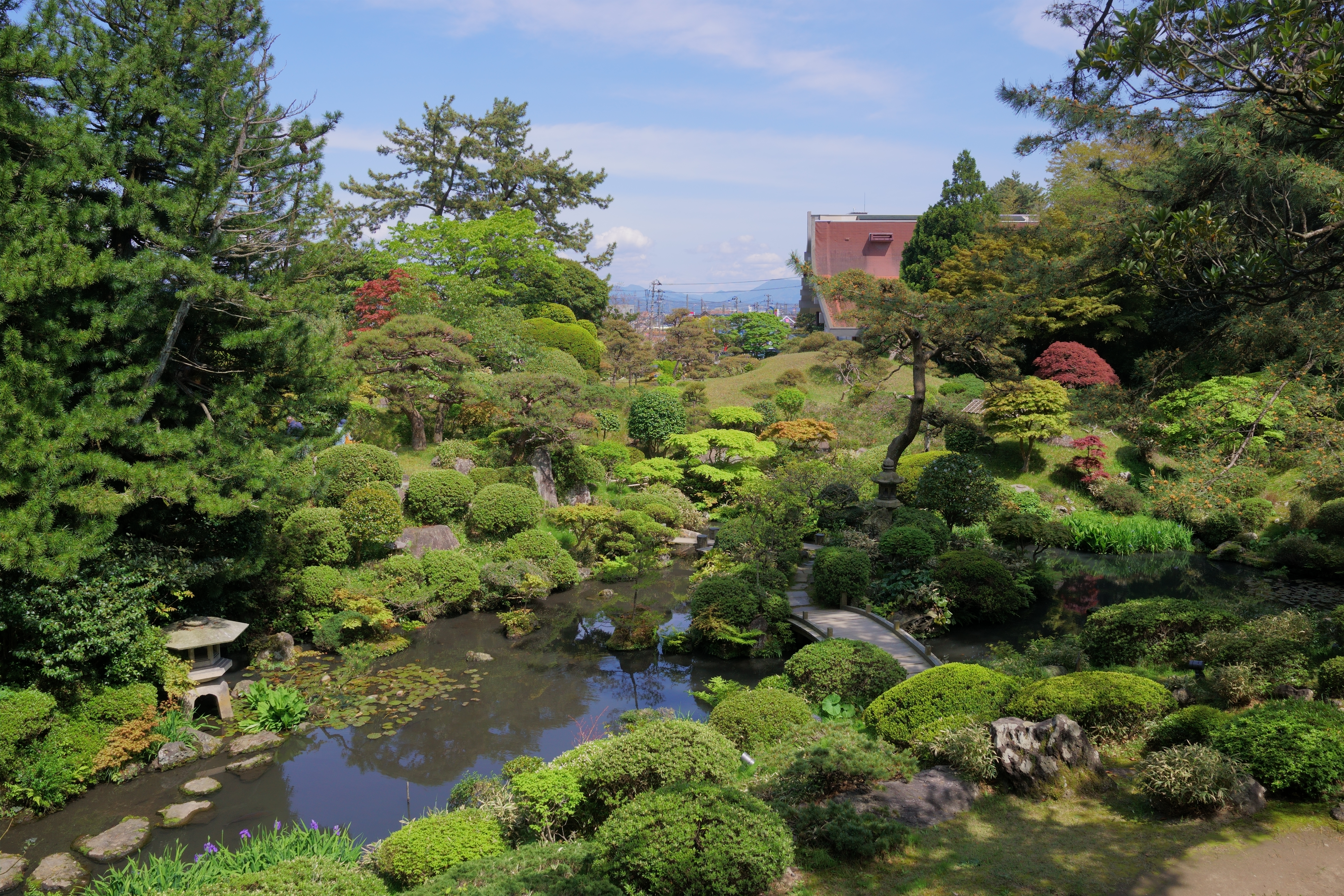
Kakubu-en

The Kakubu-en (鶴舞園) or "Dancing Crane" Gardens, is designated a National Place of Scenic Beauty. It incorporates Mount Chōkai by way of borrowed scenery.

== Folk song ==
The folk song 'Homma Sama is out of our reach but we wanna be Tonosama at least' shows the prosperity of the Homma family when "Tonosama" as the top of warrior class was ranked highest according to the social class system (Emperor, Court Nobility, Shōgun, Daimyō, Samurai, Peasants, Craftsmen and Merchants) established in the early Edo period (See also Edo period#Society).

== See also ==
- List of Places of Scenic Beauty of Japan (Yamagata)
- List of Cultural Properties of Japan - paintings (Yamagata)
