= Yamagata Museum of Art =

- 山形美術館
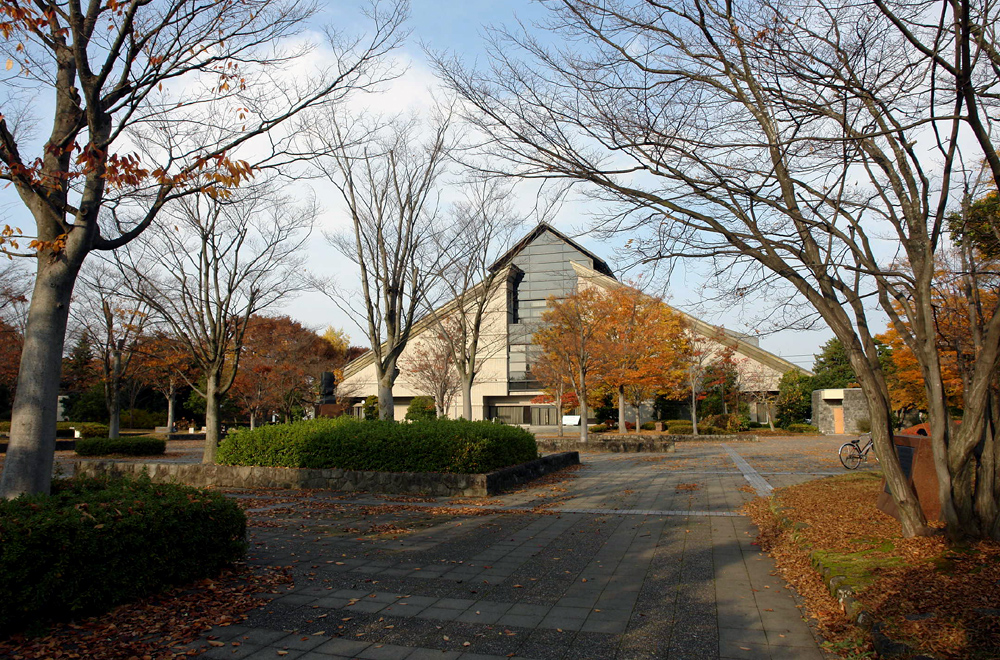

General information
- Location: 1-63 Ōte-machi, Yamagata, Yamagata Prefecture, Japan
- Coordinates: 38°15′21″N 140°19′57″E
- Opened: August 1964
- Renovated: 10 August 1985

Website
- www.yamagata-art-museum.or.jp/en

Yamagata Museum of Art (山形美術館, Yamagata bijutsukan) opened in Yamagata, Yamagata Prefecture, Japan, in 1964. The Museum's annex opened in 1968. In 1985 the new three-story main building opened; the annex was renovated the following year. The collection includes works by Manet, Monet, Renoir, Cézanne, and Takahashi Yuichi, as well as Yosa Buson's six-panel byōbu of 1779, Oku no Hosomichi (Important Cultural Property). Many of these Impressionist works are from the collection of Yoshino Gypsum Co., Ltd (吉野石膏), deposited at the Museum.

== See also ==
- Yamagata Prefectural Museum
- Homma Museum of Art
- List of Cultural Properties of Japan - paintings (Yamagata)
