= Yamagata Prefectural Museum =

- 山形県立博物館
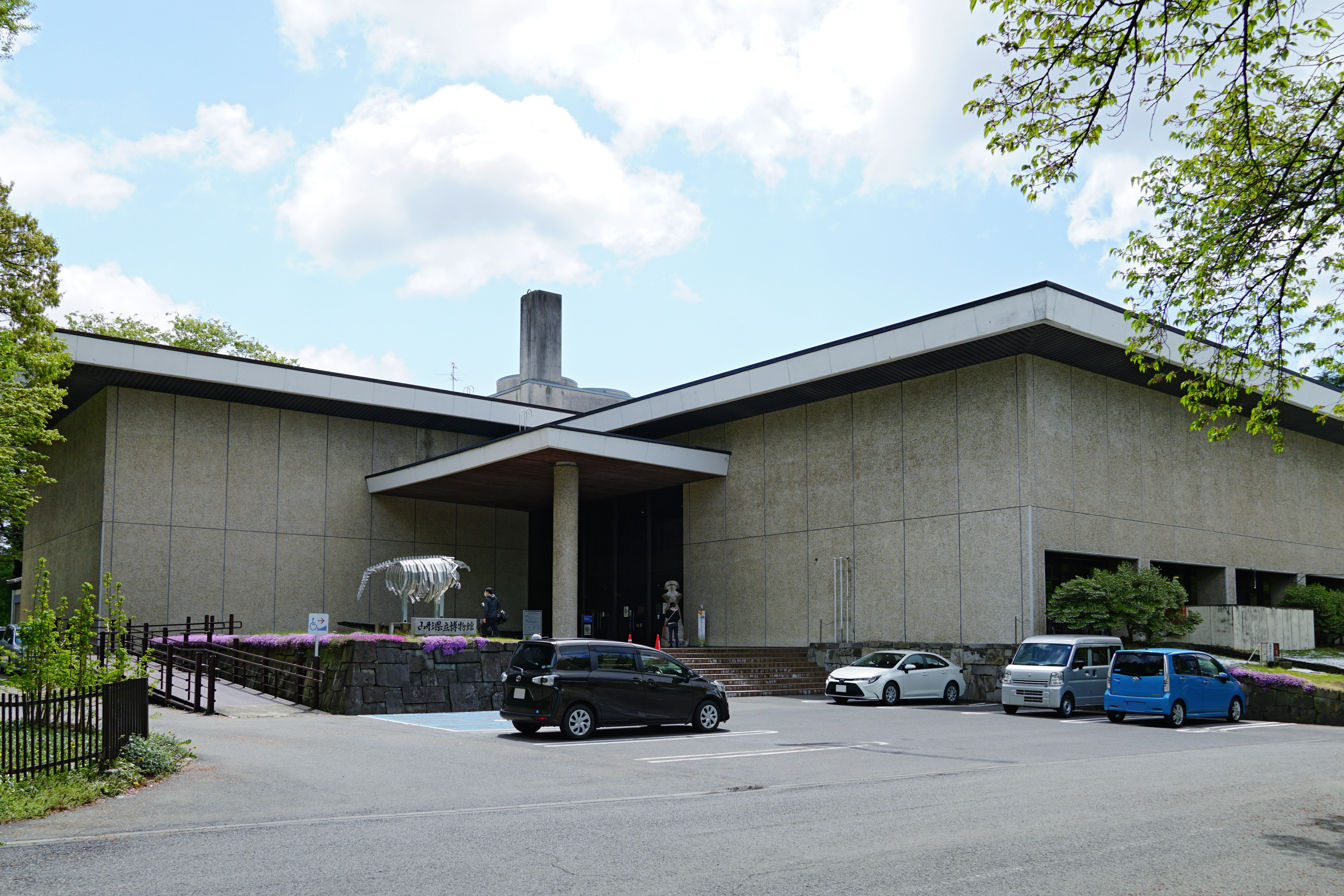

General information
- Location: 1-8 Kajō-machi, Yamagata, Yamagata Prefecture, Japan
- Coordinates: 38°15′16″N 140°19′46″E
- Opened: 1971

Website
- homepage

Yamagata Prefectural Museum (山形県立博物館, Yamagata Kenritsu Hakubutsukan) is a prefectural museum in Yamagata, Japan, dedicated to the natural history and history of Yamagata Prefecture. The museum opened in Kajō Park (霞城公園) in 1971.

== See also ==
- List of Historic Sites of Japan (Yamagata)
- Dewa Province
