= Fukura Station =

Railway station in Yuza, Yamagata Prefecture, Japan

Fukura Station 吹浦駅
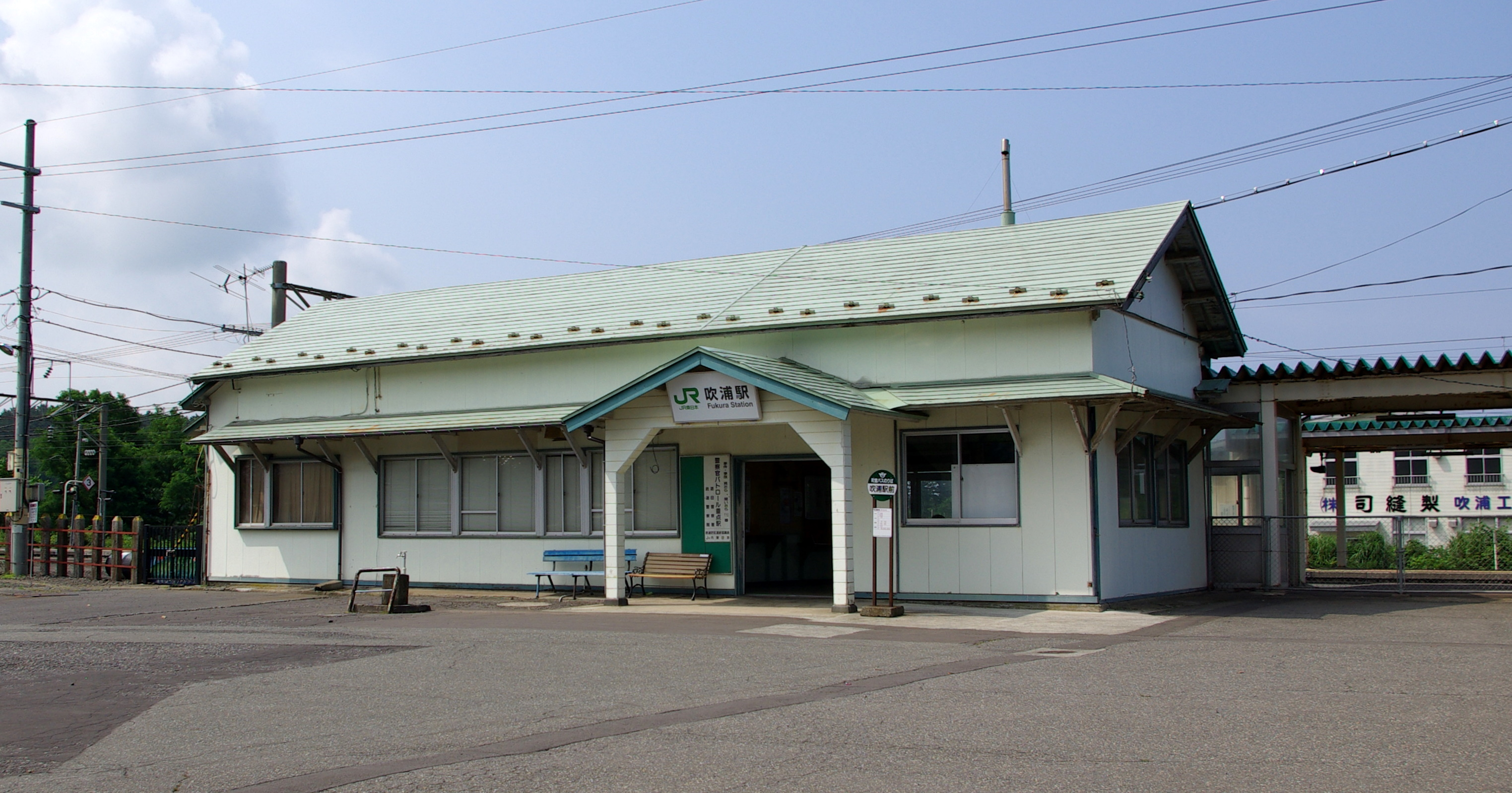
- Fukura Station, July 2009

General information
- Location: 45 Kamikawahara, Fukura, Yuza-machi, Akumi-gun, Yamagata-ken 999-8521; Japan
- Coordinates: 39°4′11.7″N 139°52′43.5″E
- Operator: JR East
- Line: ■ Uetsu Main Line
- Distance: 186.1 kilometers from Niitsu
- Platforms: 1 side + 1 island platform

Other information
- Status: Unstaffed
- Website: Official website

History
- Opened: July 30, 1920

Passengers
- FY2007: 102

Services
| Preceding station | JR East | Following station |
|---|---|---|
| Yuza towards Niitsu | Uetsu Main Line | Mega towards Akita |
Location
- Location within Yamagata Prefecture Location within Japan

Fukura Station (吹浦駅, Fukura-eki) is a railway station in the town of Yuza, Yamagata, Japan, operated by East Japan Railway Company (JR East).

== Lines ==
Fukura Station is served by the Uetsu Main Line, and is located 186.1 km from the starting point of the line at Niitsu Station.

== Station layout ==
The station has one side platform and one island platform connected by a footbridge. The station is unattended.

=== Platforms ===
| 1 | ■ Uetsu Main Line | for Tsuruoka and Sakata |
| 2 | ■ Uetsu Main Line | (through trains) |
| 3 | ■ Uetsu Main Line | for Ugo-Honjō and Akita |

== History ==
Fukura Station opened on July 30, 1920. The station has been unattended since October 1981. With the privatization of JNR on April 1, 1987, the station came under the control of JR East.

== Surrounding area ==
- Jūroku Rakan Iwa
- National Route 345
