= 100 Fishing Village Heritage Sites (Japan) =

The 100 Fishing Village Heritage Sites, more fully the 100 Select Fishing Industry Fishing Village Historical and Cultural Heritage Sites to be Preserved for the Future (未来に残したい漁業漁村の歴史文化財産百選), is an initiative of the National Association of Fisheries Infrastructure (全国漁港漁場協会) endorsed by the Ministry of Agriculture, Forestry and Fisheries, Japan.

Out of the original 350 submissions, a committee selected the final 100 fishing villages in 2006. The purpose of the initiative is to promote interest in and reuse of the historic and culturally important facilities of the fishing industry and their traditional styles and methods of construction. At the time of selection, some 6,291 fishing villages were recognized, one for every 5.5 km of the coast.

== Sites ==
Site	Prefecture	Municipality	Comments	Image	Coordinates	Ref
Herring Fishery Architecture 鰊漁場建築 nishin gyoba kenchiku	Hokkaidō	Ishikari, Obira, Otaru, Rumoi, Suttsu, Tomari, Yoichi	seven elements: the Former Hanada Family Banya (旧花田家番屋) (ICP dating to 1905, pictured); Former Rumoi Saga Family Fishery (旧留萌佐賀家漁場) (in use from 1844 to 1957, Historic Site, a collection of 3,745 related tools is an Important Tangible Folk Cultural Property); Ishikari City Hamamasu Folk Museum (石狩市はまます郷土資料館); Otaru Nishin Goten (小樽市鰊御殿) (Former Tanaka Family Banya (旧田中家番屋)); Former Yoichi Fukuhara Fishery (旧余市福原漁場); Tomari Nishin Goten (鰊御殿とまり) (Former Kawamura Family Banya (旧川村家番屋), Former Takei Family Lodge (旧武井邸客殿)); Suttsu Nishin Goten (鰊御殿)		44°08′14″N 141°39′19″E	
Former Shimo-Yoichi Unjōya 旧下ヨイチ運上家 kyū-Shimo-Yoichi unjōya	Hokkaidō	Yoichi	built by the Matsumae Domain to facilitate trade and exchange between the Wajin and the Ainu		43°11′52″N 140°47′17″E	
Shimamaki Fukuroma 袋澗 fukuroma	Hokkaidō	Shimamaki	temporary herring storage facility		42°44′02″N 140°05′26″E	
Yokoyama House 横山家; Yokoyama-ke	Hokkaidō	Esashi			41°52′01″N 140°07′31″E	
Ishizaki Fishing Port Tunnel 石崎漁港トンネル航路; Ishizaki gyokō tonneru kōro	Hokkaidō	Kaminokuni			41°42′19″N 140°01′19″E	
Hakodate Fishing Port Entrance Breakwater 函館漁港船入澗防波堤; Hakodate gyokō funairima bōhatei	Hokkaidō	Hakodate			41°46′24″N 140°42′00″E	
Collection of 67 mudamahagi-type Fishing Boats from the Tsugaru Strait and Surrounding Areas 津軽海峡及び周辺地域のムダマハギ型漁船コレクション67隻; Tsugaru-kaikyō oyobi shūhen chiiki no mudamahagi-gata gyosen korekushon 67-seki	Aomori	Aomori	Important Tangible Folk Cultural Property; at the Aomori Museum of History		40°50′15″N 140°43′32″E	
Fishing Gear and Beach Hut 漁撈用具と浜小屋 gyorō-yō gu to hama-goya	Aomori	Hachinohe			40°29′42″N 141°37′47″E	
Tsukuehama Fishing Village Banya 机浜漁村番屋群; Tsukuehama gyoson banya-gun	Iwate	Tanohata			39°58′27″N 141°56′30″E	
Sanriku Tsunami Facilities 三陸津波伝承施設; Sanriku tsunami denshō shisetsu	Iwate	Kamaishi, Miyako	two elements: the Tarō Sea Wall (田老防潮堤) and Ryōishi Tsunami Memorials (両石津波記念碑)		39°44′06″N 141°58′26″E	
Cape Ne Tiger-Ladder Dance and Kurosaki Jinja 根岬はしご虎舞と黒崎神社; Ne-saki hashi go-tora-mai to Kurosaki Jinja	Iwate	Rikuzentakata	the shrine was founded in 1172; the festival takes place every four years on the tenth day of the ninth month of the old lunar calendar, using ladders twenty metres long		38°57′16″N 141°43′24″E	
Shiogama Minato Matsuri and Parade Boat みなと祭りと御座船; Minato matsuri to go-zasen	Miyagi	Shiogama			38°19′09″N 141°01′44″E	
Yuri Coast Sea Wall 由利海岸波除石垣; Yuri-kaigan nami-yoke ishigaki	Akita	Nikaho			39°16′51″N 139°55′18″E	
Jūroku Rakan Iwa 十六羅漢岩; Jūroku Rakan iwa	Yamagata	Yuza			39°04′24″N 139°52′05″E	
Matsukawa Bay Entrance 松川浦の浦口; Matsukawa-ura no ura-guchi	Fukushima	Sōma			37°49′34″N 140°58′32″E	
Hitachi Ōtsu Ofuna-matsuri and Festival Boats 常陸大津の御船祭と祭事船; Hitachi Ōtsu no ofuna-matsuri to saiji-sen	Ibaraki	Kitaibaraki			36°49′39″N 140°47′02″E	
Hobiki-bune 帆びき船; Hobiki-bune	Ibaraki	Itako, Kasumigaura, Namegata, Tsuchiura			36°04′40″N 140°12′31″E	
Yamamoto Family Residence 山本家住宅; Yamamoto-ke jūtaku	Ibaraki	Kamisu			35°53′06″N 140°40′42″E	
History of the Development of the Fishing Industry in Chōshi 銚子漁業開拓の歴史; Chōshi gyogyō kaitaku no rekishi	Chiba	Chōshi	three elements: Kawaguchi Jinja (川口神社), Senninzuka (千人塚), and Tokawa Fishing Village (外川漁村)		35°44′18″N 140°51′20″E	
Iwafune Jizō 岩船地蔵尊; Iwafune Jizō-son	Chiba	Isumi			35°12′27″N 140°23′35″E	
Minamibōsō Whaling Tradition Facilities 南房総捕鯨伝承施設; Minamibōsō hogei denshō shisetsu	Chiba	Kyonan, Minamibōsō	three elements: the Wada Bay Whale Body Treatment Area (和田浦鯨体処理場), Chōshō-ji (長性寺ほか), and Daigo Shinbee Graves and Whale Mound (醍醐新兵衛墓所、鯨塚ほか)		35°02′09″N 140°00′54″E	
Funabashi Daijingū Lighthouse 船橋大神宮灯明台; Funabashi Daijingū tōmyō-dai	Chiba	Funabashi	built in 1880 in the grounds of Ōhi Jinja		35°12′27″N 140°23′35″E	
Sites Related to the Fishing Industry of Edo-Tōkyō: Tsukuda-jima, Nihonbashi, Tsukiji 江戸東京漁業ゆかりの地 佃島・日本橋・築地; Edo Tōkyō gyogyō yukari no chi	Tōkyō	Chūō			35°41′03″N 139°46′37″E	
Takamori Lighthouse 高森灯台; Takamori tōdai	Tōkyō	Niijima			34°19′56″N 139°13′13″E	
Five Wasen 和船5艘 wasen go-sō	Kanagawa	Yokosuka			35°16′28″N 139°40′25″E	
Fishing Tradition of Manazuru 真鶴の漁業伝統; Manazuru no gyogyō dentō	Kanagawa	Manazuru	two elements: the Kibune Festival Kobaya-bune (貴船まつりの小早船) and Uotsuki Protected Forest (魚つき保安林) (in 1672, concerned by deforestation, the Odawara Domain gave 150,000 pine saplings to each village)		35°08′43″N 139°09′10″E	
Ado-ike 安戸池; Ado-ike	Kagawa	Higashikagawa	popular for mullet-fishing until the Meiji period		34°14′31″N 134°23′45″E	
Minoura Fishing Port 箕浦漁港; Minoura gyokō	Kagawa	Kan'onji			34°14′31″N 134°23′45″E	
Monument to Kathleen Mary Drew-Baker ドゥルー女史記念碑; Dōrū-jo shi kinen-hi	Kumamoto	Uto			32°42′31″N 130°35′25″E	
Utase-bune うたせ船 ofuna-yori	Kumamoto	Ashikita			32°18′05″N 130°28′52″E	
Sakitsu Church 﨑津天主堂; Sakitsu tenshūdō	Kumamoto	Amakusa	Sakitsu Village (崎津集落) is inscribed on the UNESCO World Heritage List as one of the Hidden Christian Sites in the Nagasaki Region		32°18′45″N 130°01′33″E	
Ofuna-yori 御船寄 ofuna-yori	Ōita	Nakatsu			33°36′41″N 131°11′34″E	
Seven Wonders of Hime-shima 姫島七不思議; Hime-shima nana fushigi	Ōita	Kunisaki	two elements: Ukisu (浮洲) and Sennindō (千人堂)		33°44′06″N 131°39′10″E	
Hoto-jima Village 保戸島集落; Hoto-jima shūraku	Ōita	Tsukumi			33°06′18″N 132°00′25″E	
Story of Abaratsu Port 油津の港物語; Abaratsu no minato monogatari	Miyazaki	Nichinan	three elements: the Horikawa Canal (堀川運河); Sugimura Hardware Store Main Building and Storehouse (杉村金物本店主家・倉庫); Choro-bune (チョロ船)		31°35′05″N 131°24′07″E	
Outrigger Utase-bune 桁打瀬船 keta-utase-bune	Kagoshima	Izumi	by 2005 their number had dwindled to 5		32°06′56″N 130°17′40″E	
Kashima Island Resident Life Centre 鹿島離島住民生活センター; Kashima ritō jūmin seikatsu sentā	Kagoshima	Satsumasendai	former headquarters of the local fishing cooperative		31°46′38″N 129°47′35″E	
Hashima Fishing Port 羽島漁港; Hashima gyokō	Kagoshima	Ichikikushikino			31°45′12″N 130°11′53″E	
Statues of Hara Kō, Developer of the Southern Fisheries 南方漁場の開拓者原耕の像 nanpō gyojō no kaitaku-sha Hara Kō no zō	Kagoshima	Makurazaki, Minamisatsuma			31°16′14″N 130°17′21″E	
Santinmō - Hakugindō 山巓毛と白銀堂; Santinmō to Hakugindō	Okinawa	Itoman			26°07′48″N 127°40′13″E	
Fish Wall 魚垣 nagaki	Okinawa	Miyakojima			24°50′09″N 125°08′43″E	
