= Yuza Station =

Railway station in Yuza, Yamagata Prefecture, Japan

Yuza Station 遊佐駅
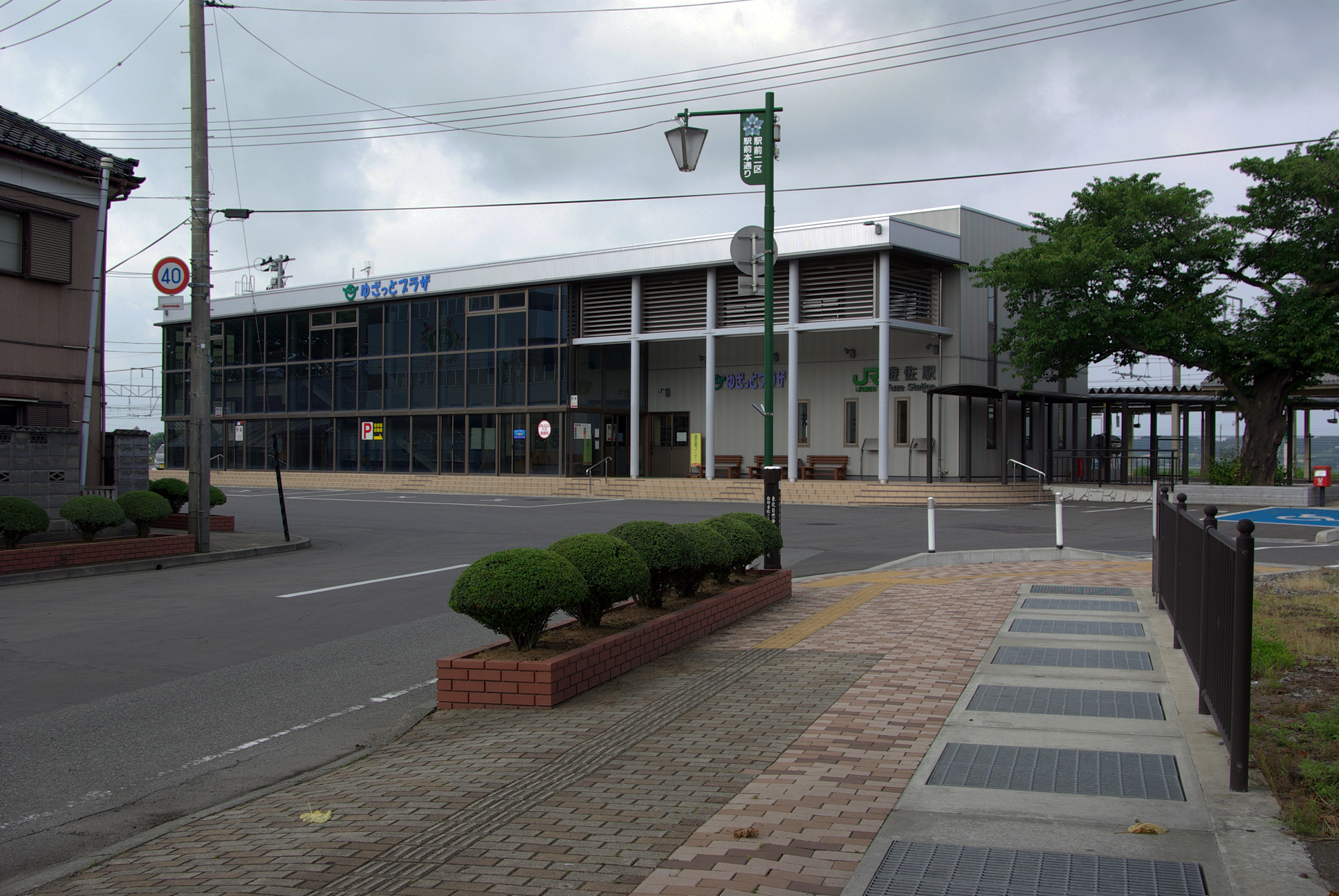
- Yuza Station, July 2009

General information
- Location: Yuza, Yuza-machi, Akumi-gun, Yamagata-ken 999-8301; Japan
- Coordinates: 39°0′57.5″N 139°54′18.5″E
- Operator: JR East
- Line: ■ Uetsu Main Line
- Distance: 179.1 kilometers from Niitsu
- Platforms: 1 side + 1 island platform

Other information
- Status: Staffed
- Website: Official website

History
- Opened: December 5, 1919

Passengers
- FY2018: 169

Services
Preceding station	JR East	Following station
Sakata towards Niigata	Inaho	Kisakata towards Akita
Minamichōkai towards Niitsu	Uetsu Main Line	Fukura towards Akita
Location
- Location within Yamagata Prefecture Location within Japan

Yuza Station (遊佐駅, Yuza eki) is a railway station located in the town of Yuza, Yamagata Prefecture, Japan, operated by the East Japan Railway Company (JR East).

== Lines ==
Yuza Station is served by the Uetsu Main Line and is located 179.1 rail kilometers from the terminus of the line at Niitsu Station.

== Station layout ==
The station has one side platform and one island platform connected by a footbridge. The station is staffed.

=== Platforms ===
1	■ Uetsu Main Line	for Tsuruoka and Sakata
2	■ Uetsu Main Line	for through trains
3	■ Uetsu Main Line	for Ugo-Honjō and Akita

== History ==
Yuza Station opened on December 5, 1919, as a station on the Japanese Government Railways (JGR). The JGR became the JNR (Japan National Railway) after World War II. With the privatization of the JNR on April 1, 1987, the station came under the control of the East Japan Railway Company. A new station building was completed on March 1, 2008.

== Passenger statistics ==
In fiscal 2018, the station was used by an average of 169 passengers daily (boarding passengers only).

== Surrounding area ==
- Yuza Town Hall
- Yuza High School
- National Route 345

== See also ==
- List of railway stations in Japan
