= Jūroku Rakan Iwa =

Monument in Yuza, Japan

Coordinates: 39°4′24″N 139°52′5″E

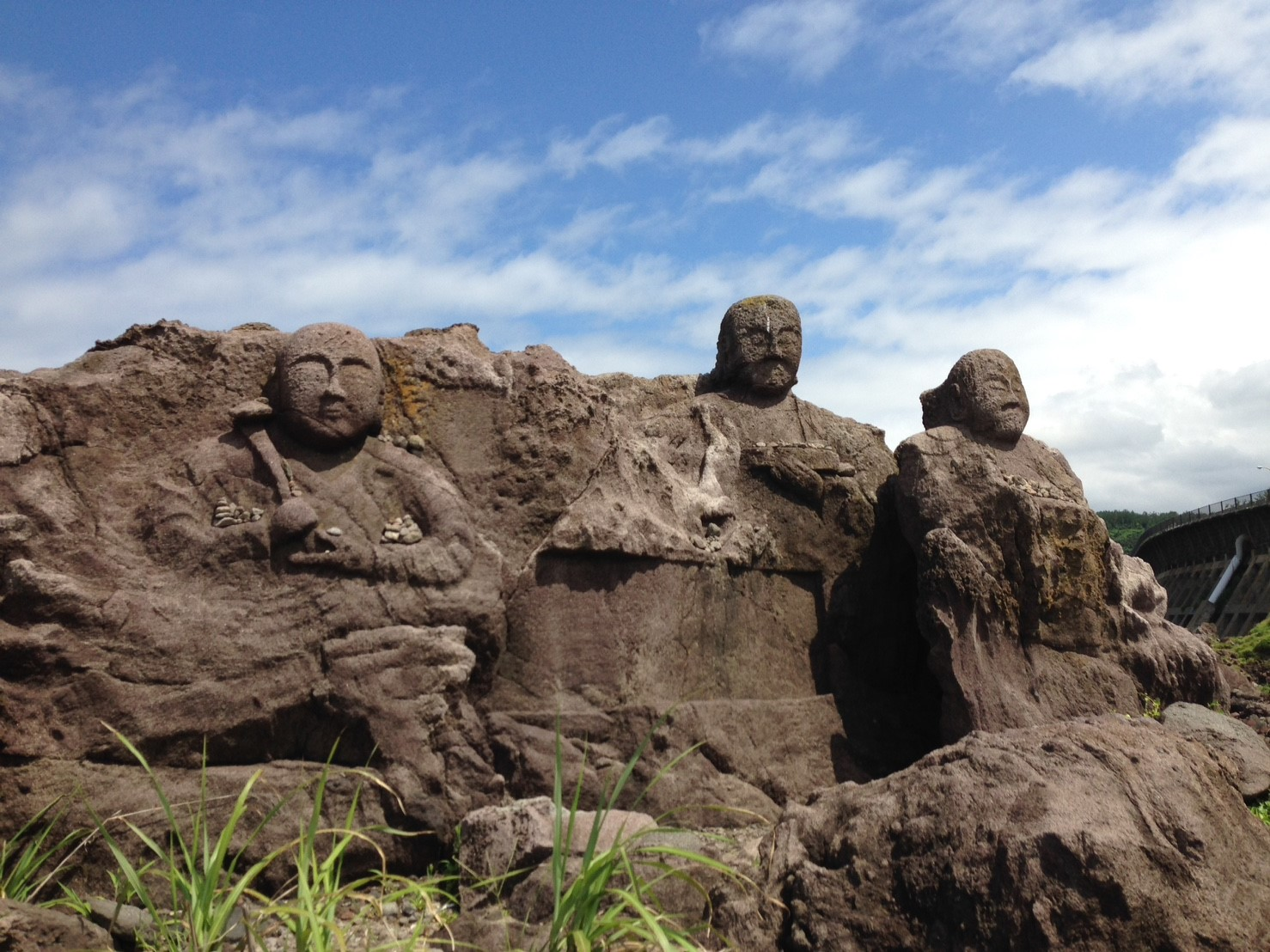
Jūroku Rakan Iwa

The Jūroku Rakan Iwa (十六羅漢岩) or "Sixteen Rakan Rocks" is a monument to the local fishermen in Yuza, Yamagata Prefecture, Japan. Carved from volcanic rock by a Buddhist monk between 1864 and 1868, there are in total twenty-two figures: the Sixteen Arhats along with Shakyamuni, Manjusri, Fugen and his consort, Avalokitesvara, and the Sarira. A little to the south of the carvings is Dewa Futami, or the Wedded rocks of Dewa Province.

The Jūroku Rakan Iwa are among the 100 Fishing Village Heritage Sites sponsored by the National Association of Fisheries and endorsed by the Ministry of Agriculture, Forestry and Fisheries.

There is an annual ceremony in late July, when the sculptures are illuminated at night.

== See also ==
- Japanese sculpture
- Arhat
- Sixteen Arhats
- Fukura Station
