= Japan National Route 342 =

Road in Japan

National Route 342
- 国道342号
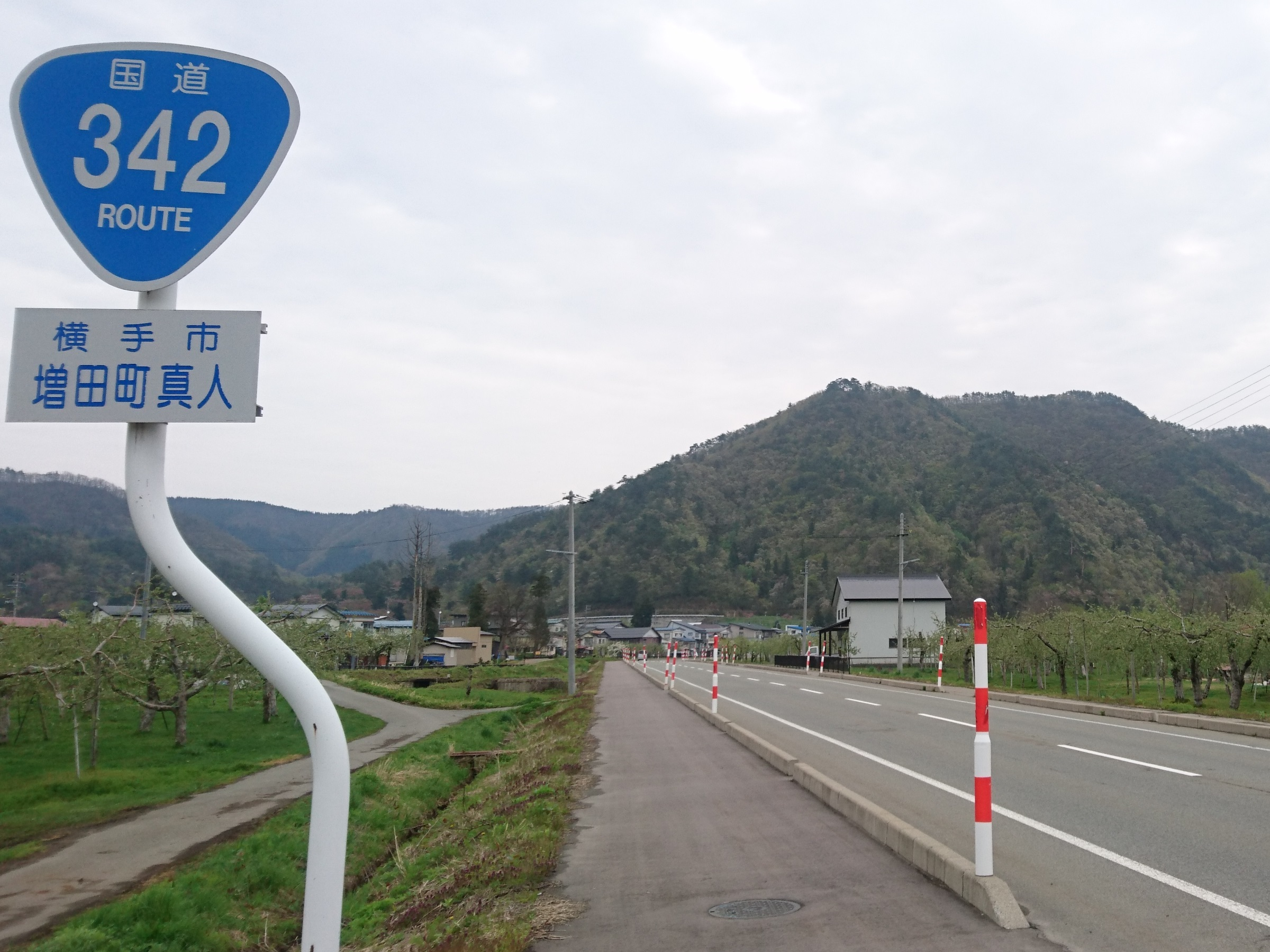

Route information
- Length: 148.9 km (92.5 mi)

Location
- Country: Japan

Highway system
- National highways of Japan; Expressways of Japan
← National Route 341	→ National Route 343

National Route 342 is a national highway of Japan connecting Yokote, Akita and Tome, Miyagi in Japan, with a total length of 148.9 km (92.5 mi).
