= Japan National Route 343 =

Road in Iwate prefecture, Japan

National Route 343
- 国道343号
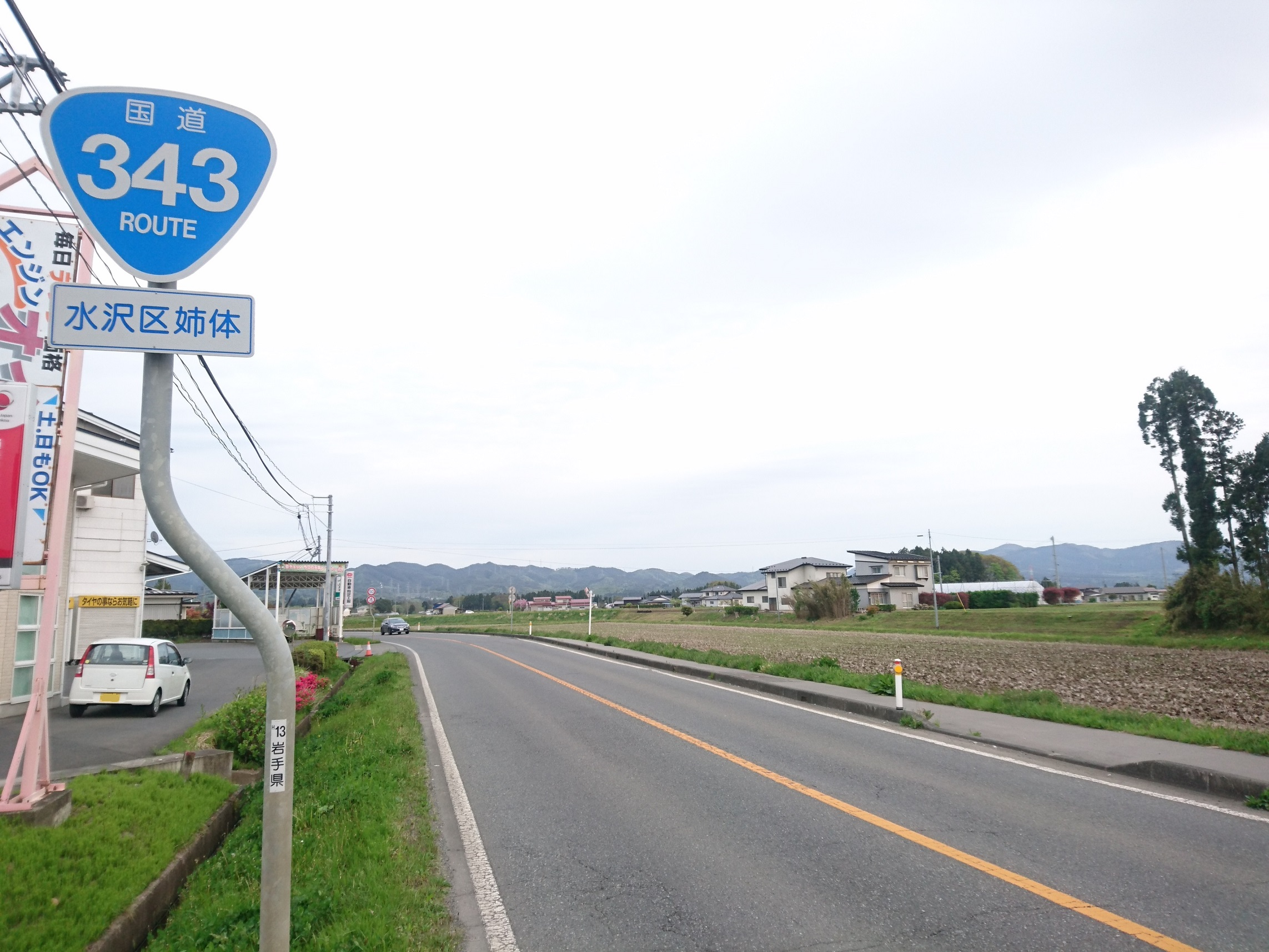

Route information
- Length: 65.1 km (40.5 mi)

Location
- Country: Japan

Highway system
- National highways of Japan; Expressways of Japan
← National Route 342	→ National Route 344

National Route 343 is a national highway of Japan connecting Rikuzentakata, Iwate and Ōshū, Iwate in Japan, with a total length of 65.1 km (40.45 mi).
