= 2019 Yamagata earthquake =

Earthquake in Japan

- 山形県沖地震
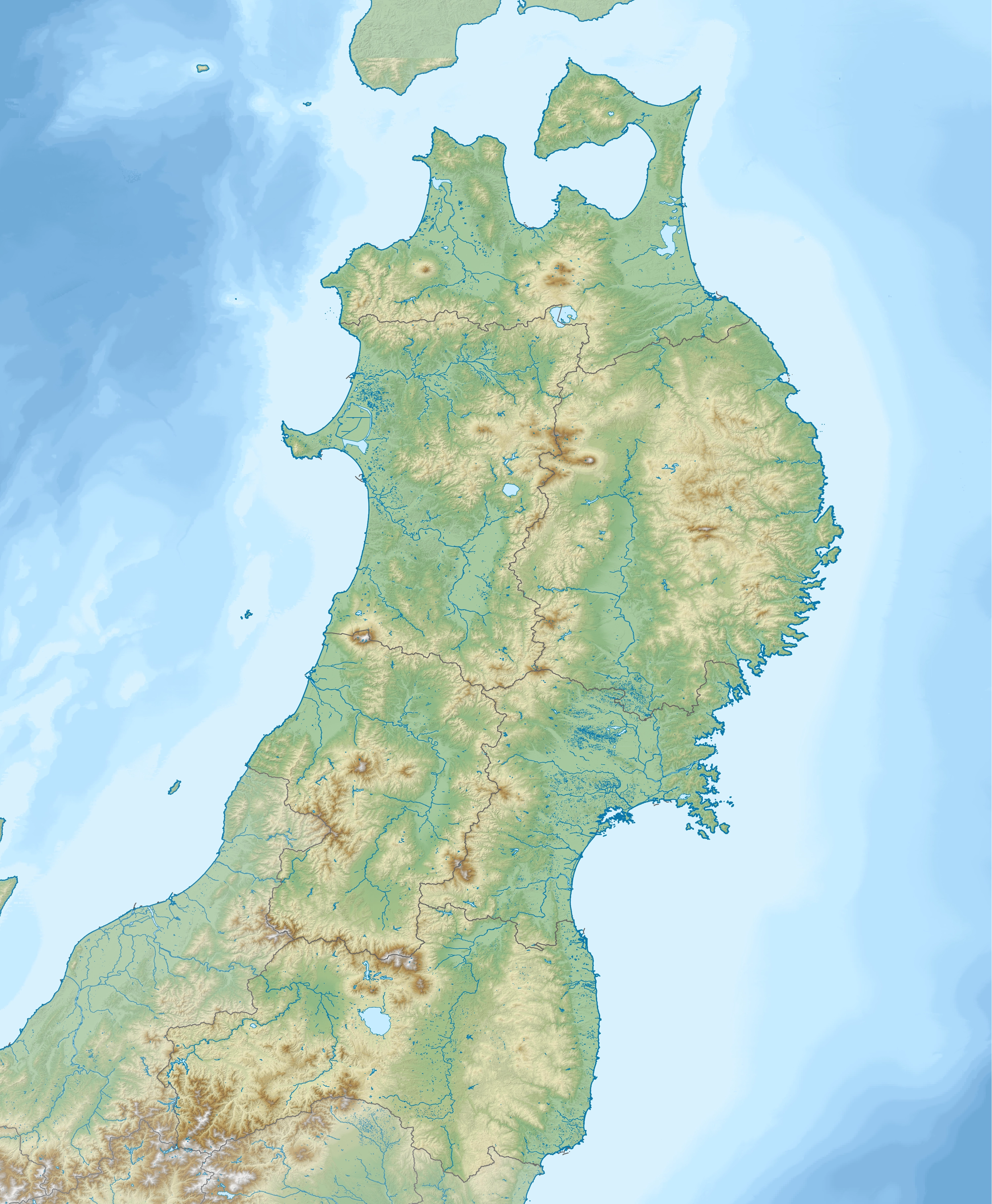
- Location within Tohoku, Japan
- UTC time: 2019-06-18 13:22:20
- ISC event: 615958611
- USGS-ANSS: ComCat
- Local date: June 18, 2019
- Local time: 10:22 p.m. JST
- Magnitude: 6.4 M_{w} (USGS); 6.7 M_{JMA} (JMA)
- Depth: 10 km (6 mi)
- Epicenter: 38.635°N 139.454°E
- Type: Reverse
- Areas affected: Ishikawa Prefecture, Miyagi Prefecture, Niigata Prefecture, Yamagata Prefecture, and southern Akita Prefecture
- Max. intensity: MMI VII (Very strong) JMA 6+
- Tsunami: Yes (up to 10 cm (4 in))
- Casualties: 26 injured

The 2019 Yamagata earthquake (山形県沖地震, Yamagata-ken Oki Jishin) was an earthquake of magnitude 6.4 M_{w} which struck primarily the Hokuriku region in Japan on 18 June 2019 at 22:22 JST (13:22 UTC). The epicenter was close to the city of Tsuruoka, Yamagata. A tsunami warning was also issued.

== Geology ==
The northwestern side of Honshu lies on the southeastern margin of the Sea of Japan, an area of oceanic crust created by back-arc spreading from the late Oligocene to middle Miocene. The extensional tectonics associated with the spreading formed a series of N–S trending extensional faults and associated basins. The crust in this area is subjected to east–west compression associated with the convergent boundary between the Amur Plate and the Okhotsk microplate (Note: These minor plates are arguably part of the Eurasian plate and North American plate, respectively.). As a result of this strain, the north–south trending extensional faults are reactivated in a reverse sense. The 1964 Niigata earthquake, the 1983 Sea of Japan earthquake, and the 1993 Hokkaidō earthquake were all a result of similar processes.

== Damage and effects ==
The magnitude 6.4 earthquake triggered a tsunami advisory for three prefectures in Japan. A tsunami with a height of 10 cm was reported in Niigata. The earthquake damaged a total of 149 homes in Akita, Niigata, and Yamagata prefectures.

=== Casualties ===
Twenty-six people were reported to be injured, mostly by fallen debris.

=== Transportation ===
Sections of the Nihonkai-Tōhoku Expressway and Yamagata Expressway were closed by the East Nippon Expressway Company. National Route 345 was blocked by fallen debris in Murakami.

=== Utilities ===
Tohoku Electric Power announced that a blackout occurred in parts of Yamagata and Niigata prefectures because of the earthquake, with 1000 customers impacted in Tsuruoka and 200 customers impacted in Sakata. As a safety precaution, gas services were interrupted in Niigata Prefecture.

== Seismic intensity ==
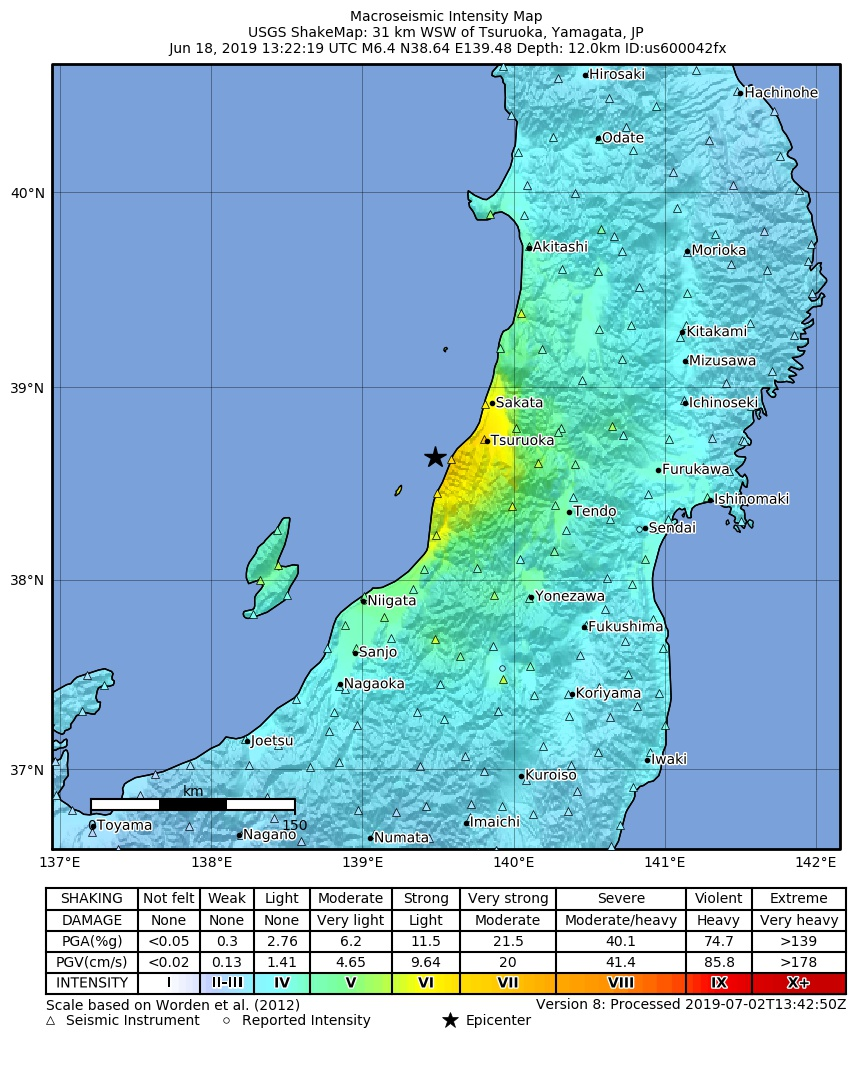
USGS ShakeMap for the event

This chart describes the maximum perceived shaking using the Japan Meteorological Agency seismic intensity scale, or Shindo scale, for the earthquake throughout the impacted area.

Cities and municipalities impacted by a seismic intensity level of 5 or more
Intensity	Prefecture	City or municipality name
6+	Niigata	Murakami
6-	Yamagata	Atsumigawa, Tsuruoka
5+	Yamagata	Atsumi, Tsuruoka, Michidamachi, Tsuruoka
5-	Niigata	Nagaoka, Kashiwazaki, Aga
5-	Yamagata	Other areas in Tsuruoka, Sakata, Ōkura, Mikawa
5-	Akita	Yurihonjō

== See also ==
- 2018 Hokkaido Eastern Iburi earthquake
