= Koyamazaki Site =

Jōmon period archaeological site in Yuza, Yamagata, Japan

Koyamazaki ruins
- 小山崎遺跡 (Japanese)
- Koyamazaki ruins Koyamazaki Site (Japan)
- Interactive map of Koyamazaki ruins
- 39°04′18″N 139°53′20″E
- Type: settlement
- Periods: Jōmon period
- Location: Yuza, Yamagata, Japan
- Region: Tōhoku region

Site notes
- Public access: Yes (no facilities)

The Koyamazaki ruins (小山崎遺跡, Koyamazaki iseki) is an archaeological site containing the ruins of a Jōmon period settlement located in what is now the Nanamagarihigashi, Fukiura neighborhood of the town of Yuza, Yamagata in the Tōhoku region of northern Japan. The site was designated a National Historic Site of Japan on March 10, 2020.

== Overview ==
The Koyamazaki site spreads out on the southwestern foot of Mount Chōkai, on the right bank of the Ushiwatari River. The main remains are on the hill slopes to the north and the lowlands to the west, centering on a tongue-shaped plateau about 5 meters above sea level which protrudes from the foot of the mountain into the plains. The Ushiwata River flows westward to the south of the ruins. This is a river with a salmon run, and salmon bones have been detected in the soil of the ruins. In the virgin forest on the east side of the ruins is Maruike Pond, which has existed since the Jōmon period and is still worshiped as a sacred site today. It has a diameter of 30 meters and a depth of 3 to 4 meters.

The site was inhabited over a period of time, from the early Jōmon period to the late Jōmon period, with the major concentration of remains from the late-middle to final period. The length of continuous occupation provides valuable insight into how land use evolved with changes in the natural environment, such as major changes in sea levels and climate in the "Jōmon transgression" and "Jōmon regression". It provides insight into differences between villages located on the slopes of the hills and the waterside remains located in the lowlands. A large amount of both animal and plant remains have been unearthed from this site, and since these were unearthed stratigraphically together with earthenware, stone tools, and wooden products, the evolution the Jōmon diet can also be surmised.

According to analysis of diatom fossils, the lowland around the tongue-shaped plateau, which is the center of the site, was a lagoon during the Jomon transgression in the early Jōmon period, but became a tidal flat and then a low marsh after the middle Jomon period. Relics from the early Jomon period have been unearthed from a slightly elevated area on the east side of the site, and three shell middens and one Prehistoric storage pit for storage of acorns (Quercus serrata) can be seen in these lowlands. The shell middens contained mainly clams that lived in brackish water. Acorns have traces of processing to prevent germination during storage. During the middle Jōmon period, the coastline receded (the Jōmon regression) to almost its present position due to the effects of climate cooling. In the middle to late period, a settlement was formed on the hillside on the north side of the site (northwest of Maruike Pond). Cultivated species such as hemp, millet, and burdock-like species have been unearthed from the inclusion layer of the late period. Also in the late period, the lowland on the west side of the ruins was developed, and the so-called "waterside remains" (described below) were built. By the middle of the late period, the use of the "waterside remains" had ended, and traces of settlement declined, leading to the speculation that the settlement was gradually abandoned.

The "waterside remains" that characterize this site are a series of facilities that were built in the late Jōmon period in the lowlands on the west side of the site, connected to the former channel of the Ushiwatari River. It consists of paving stones, driven piles, wooden paving remains, and road-like remains with a length of 23 metes and width of up to two meters. The structure also appeared to function as a levee. Similar facilities have been found in other Jōmon period settlements and were used to process acorns to remove the bitterness and make them more palatable. There was also a separate 4x 6 meter platform made of andesite paving stones on a wooden foundation to prevent uneven settling. The presence of a grinding stone with red iron oxide powder along with unfinished wooden products in this area suggests that this was connected with a workshop used to produce the red lacquered wooden products have also been unearthed at the Koyamazaki site.

== See also ==
- List of Historic Sites of Japan (Yamagata)
