= Japan National Route 344 =

Road in Japan

National Route 344
- 国道344号

Route information
- Length: 115 km (71 mi)

Location
- Country: Japan

Highway system
- National highways of Japan; Expressways of Japan
← National Route 343	→ National Route 345

National Route 344 is a national highway of Japan connecting Yuzawa, Akita and Sakata, Yamagata in Japan, with a total length of 115 km (71.46 mi).
