= Minamichōkai Station =

Railway station in Sakata, Yamagata Prefecture, Japan

Minamichōkai Station 南鳥海駅
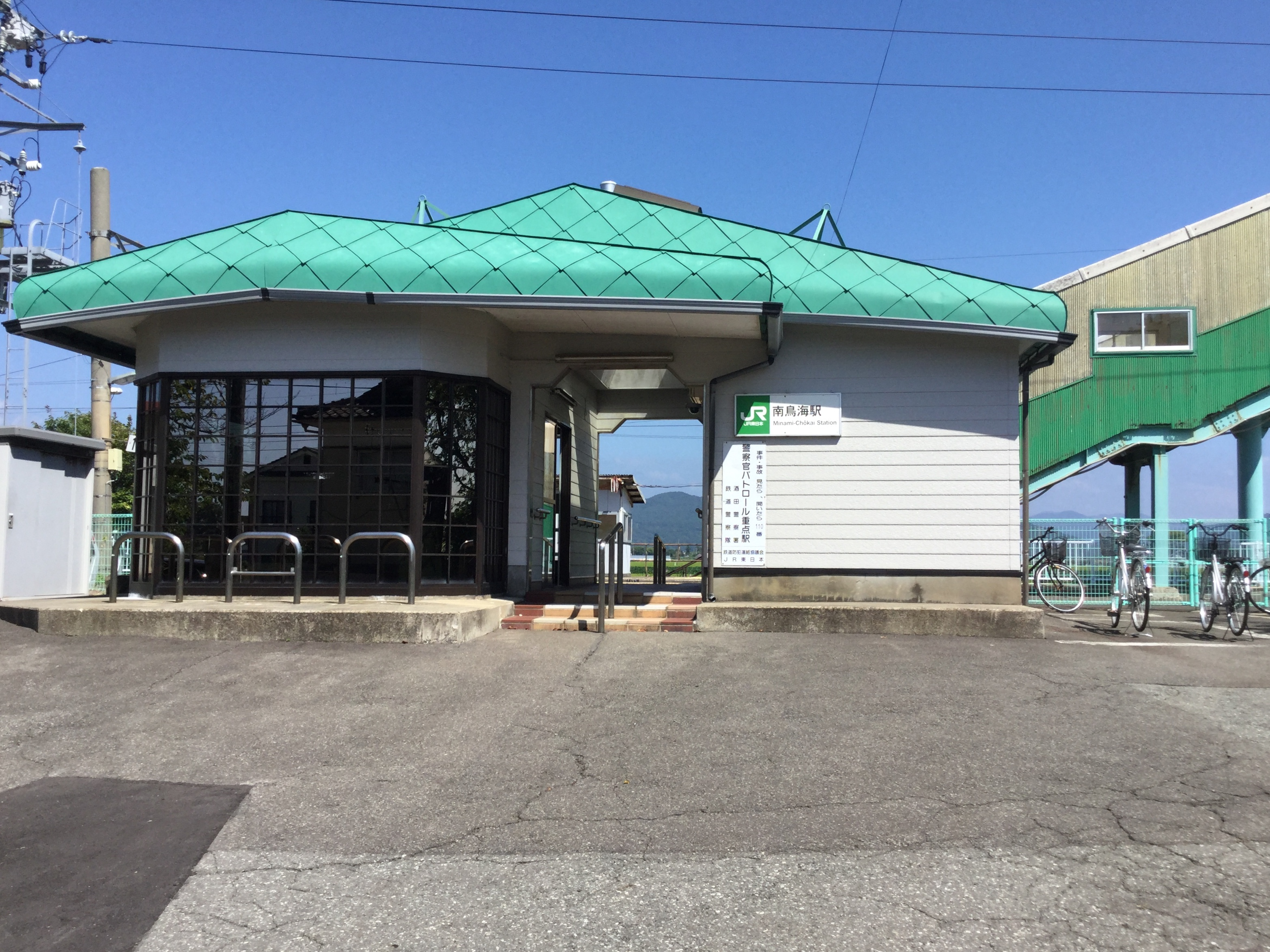
- Minamichōkai Station in August 2019

General information
- Location: Yonejima-aze Shimonakado 2, Sakata-shi, Yamagata-ken 999-8421; Japan
- Coordinates: 38.9875°N 139.8987°E
- Operator: JR East
- Line: ■ Uetsu Main Line
- Distance: 175.9 kilometers from Niitsu
- Platforms: 2 side platforms

Other information
- Status: Unstaffed
- Website: Official website

History
- Opened: January 16, 1952

Services
Preceding station	JR East	Following station
Mototate towards Niitsu	Uetsu Main Line	Yuza towards Akita
Location
- Location within Yamagata Prefecture Location within Japan

Minamichōkai Station (南鳥海駅, Minamichōkai eki) is a railway station located in the city of Sakata, Yamagata Prefecture, Japan, operated by the East Japan Railway Company (JR East).

== Lines ==
Minamichōkai Station is served by the Uetsu Main Line, and is located 175.9 rail kilometers from the terminus of the line at Niitsu Station.

== Station layout ==
The station has two opposed side platforms connected by a footbridge. The station is unattended.

=== Platforms ===
1	■ Uetsu Main Line	for Tsuruoka and Sakata
2	■ Uetsu Main Line	for Ugo-Honjō and Akita

== History ==
Minamichōkai Station opened on January 16, 1952 as a station on JNR (Japan National Railway). It has been unattended since September 1972. With the privatization of the JNR on April 1, 1987, the station came under the control of the East Japan Railway Company.

== Surrounding area ==
- Minamiyuza Post Office
- Minamiyuza Elementary School

== See also ==
- List of railway stations in Japan
