= Former Rumoi Saga Family Fishery =

Rumoi Saga Family Fishery
- 留萌佐賀家漁場 (Japanese)
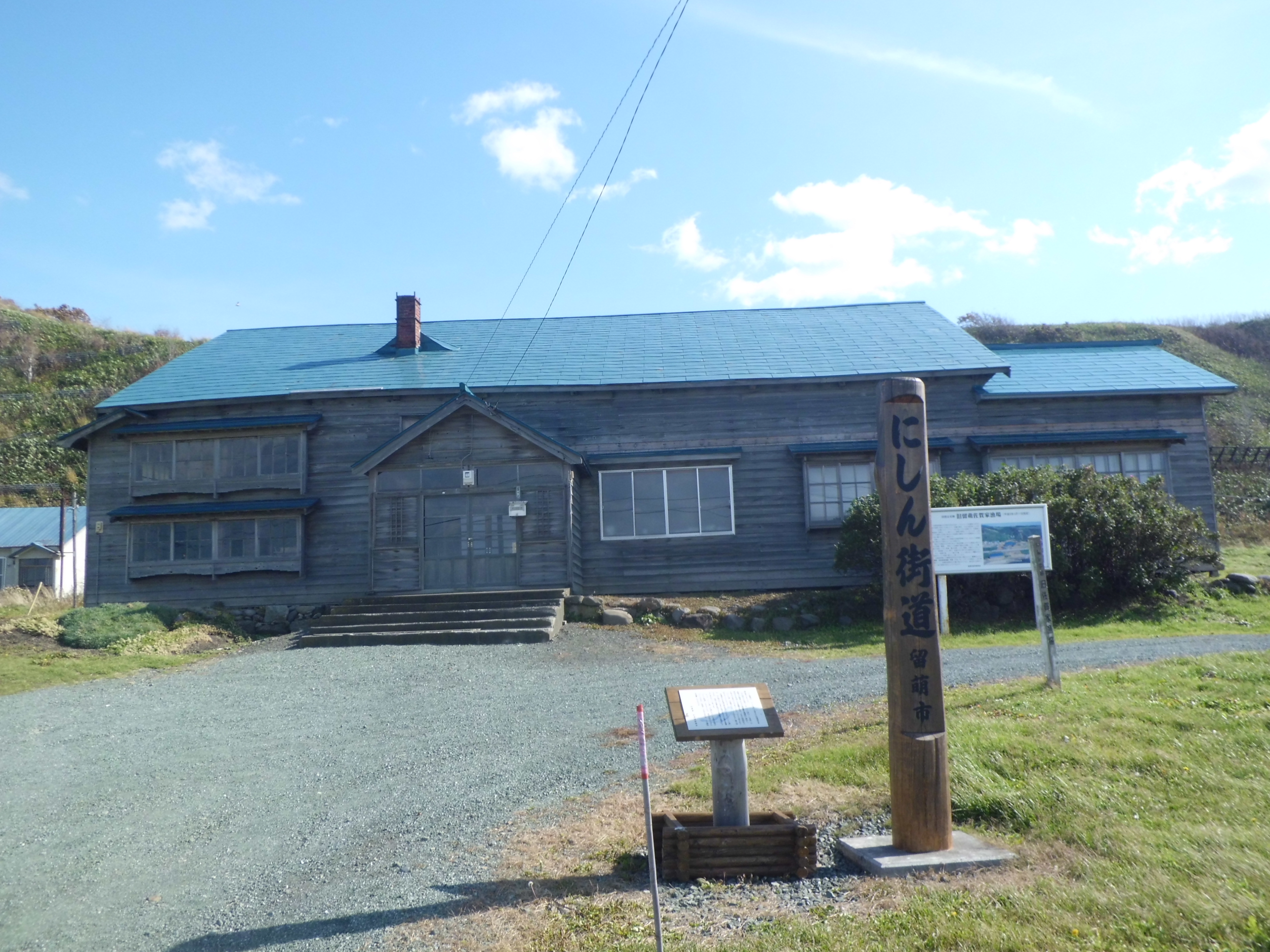
- Rumoi Saga Family Fishery Main house

- Rumoi Saga Family Fishery Former Rumoi Saga Family Fishery (Japan)
- 43°54′49″N 141°37′03″E
- Type: industrial site
- Periods: Edo period - Showa period
- Location: Rumoi, Hokkaido, Japan
- Region: Hokkaido

Site notes
- Public access: Yes (museum)
- National Historic Site of Japan

The Rumoi Saga Family Fishery (留萌佐賀家漁場, Rumoi Saga-ke gyoba) was a fishery established in the Edo period in the Reiki neighborhood of the town of Rumoi, Hokkaidō. The site was designated a National Historic Site of Japan in 1997. The Former Rumoi Saga Family Fishery is one of the 100 Fishing Village Heritage Sites (Japan).

== Overview ==
The coastal waters off Hokkaido's Sea of Japan coast, including Esashi, Suttsu, Yoichi, and Rumoi, have been major fishing grounds since the Edo period, and numerous fishing facilities were built along the coast. Matsumae Domain established trading posts to manage Ezo, and Rumoi from a fief held by the Matsumae clan, in the early 18th century a fishery under contract management. It is mentioned in the "Ezochi Guide Records" from the Tenmei era (late 18th century), as producing dried abalone, fish oil, dried sardines, and herring. The Saga family, who had a base at what is now Kazamaura, Aomori, had been engaged in fishing and shipping for generations. They acquired the contract from Matsumae Domain to take over the trading post and establish a fishery in 1844. In 1857, the Saga family stationed people permanently at Rumoi and managed the fishing grounds throughout the year. In 1869, the new Meiji government abolished the old system of contracting out fishing grounds, and then in 1876, the Hokkaidō Development Commission opened up the herring fishing grounds and allowed businesses to operate freely, but the powerful contractors and other managers who had been there since the Edo period continued to use their abundant capital to further develop their businesses. In 1887, the Saga family had a total of eight nets, including four herring nets, two salmon nets, and two trout nets, making them the largest former employer of migrant workers in the Rumoi area after the former contractors, the Suhara family.

At their peak, the Saga family operated 12 lines of fishing nets in Rumoi. In the Meiji period, the fishing industry was extremely prosperous and was an important pillar supporting Hokkaido's industry. Herring catches increased steadily until the mid-1890s, but signs of decline began to appear from the end of the decade. Although there were records of bumper catches from the end to the beginning of the Taisho period, there was a steady decline after that, and the last herring fishery came to an end in 1957 after 113 years of operation.

There are six buildings remaining today: the main house (guardhouse), a storehouse (product storage facility) built in 1903, a boathouse, a net storehouse, a temporary herring storage facility, and an Inari shrine. There are traces of some remodeling in the main house, but it is a typical flat-floored guardhouse building with the manager's residence to the right of the dirt-floored door in the center and the workers' residence to the left. The space between the main house and the storehouse/boathouse was also used as an area for drying products. Remains of a boiler for producing herring meal remain near the storehouse. There are also remains of a wharf on the foreshore. The site is divided into three parts by railroads and roads. Many valuable documents remain in the warehouse and other buildings. The set of 3,745 items of fishing equipment left at the site is protected as an Important Tangible Folk Cultural Property.

The Former Rumoi Saga Family Fishery is about a 15-minute drive from JR Hokkaidō Rumoi Main Line Rumoi Station.

== See also ==
- List of Historic Sites of Japan (Hokkaidō)
