= Ishikari City Hamamasu Folk Museum =

Japanese art museum

- 石狩市はまます郷土資料館
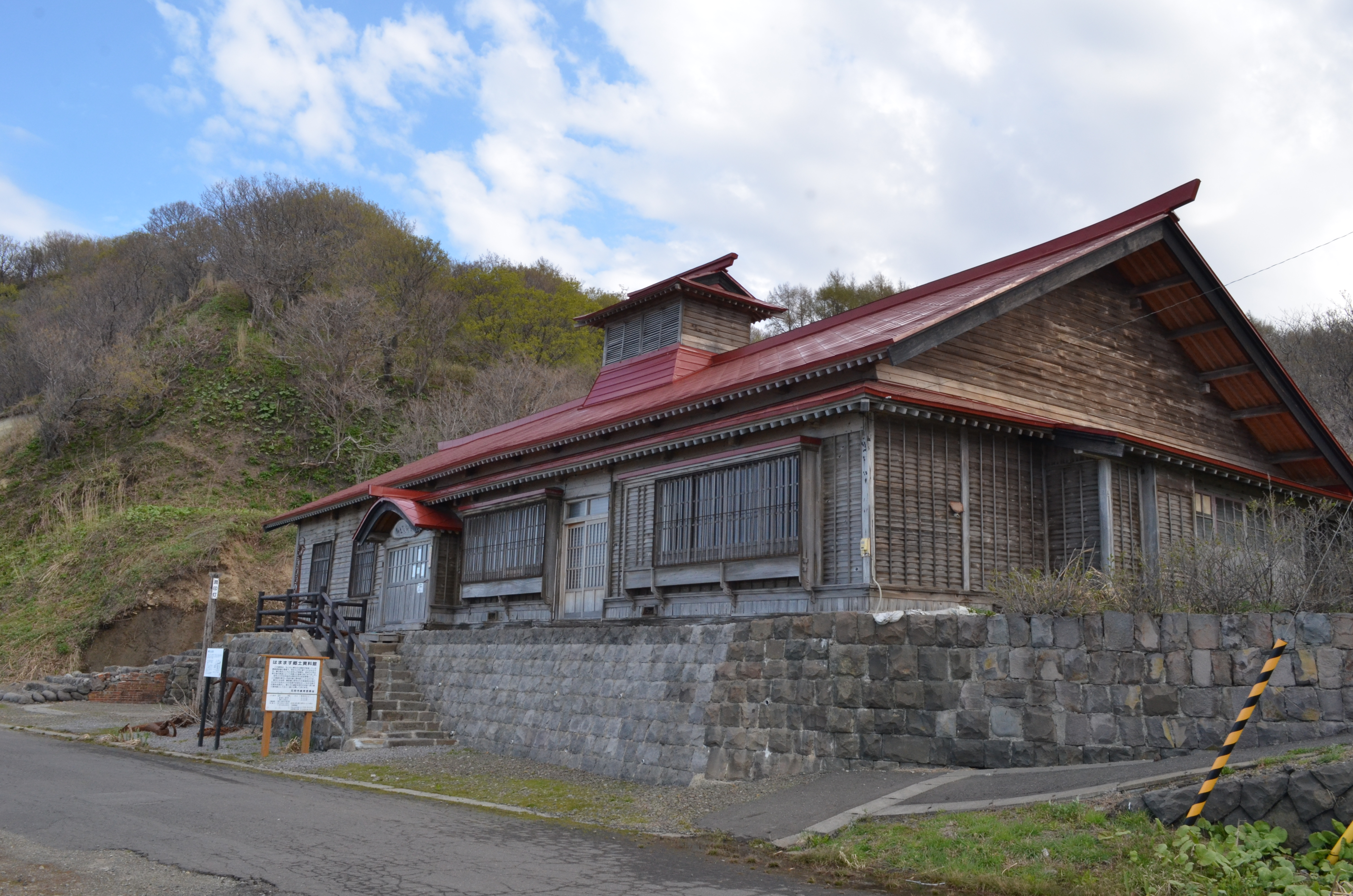
- April 2022
- Interactive map of the Ishikari City Hamamasu Folk Museum area

General information
- Location: 061-3101 Hamamasu-ku, Ishikari, Hokkaidō, Japan
- Coordinates: 43°36′45″N 141°22′26″E
- Opened: 1971

Website
- Official website

The Ishikari City Hamamasu Folk Museum (石狩市はまます郷土資料館, Ishikari-shi Hamamasu Kyōdo Shiryōkan) is a local museum in Ishikari, Hokkaidō, Japan. Formerly the Shiratori Family Guard Station (旧白鳥家番屋), the building was constructed in 1899 and served as a banqueting hall for the herring fishery workers. With the decline of the industry in the 1950s, the building fell into a state of disrepair. Restored by the then Hamamasu Village in 1971 as part of the centenary celebrations of the village's development, it served as the Hamamasu Village Museum (浜益村郷土資料館). Upon the merger of Hamamasu into Ishikari, the museum assumed its current identity. The building has been designated a Municipal Tangible Cultural Property and in 2006 was selected as one of the nation's 100 Fishing Village Heritage Sites. The collection includes tools and materials relating to the history of the local fishing industry.

== See also ==
- List of Cultural Properties of Japan - structures (Hokkaidō)
- List of Historic Sites of Japan (Hokkaidō)
