= Yuza =

Yuza 遊佐町
- Town
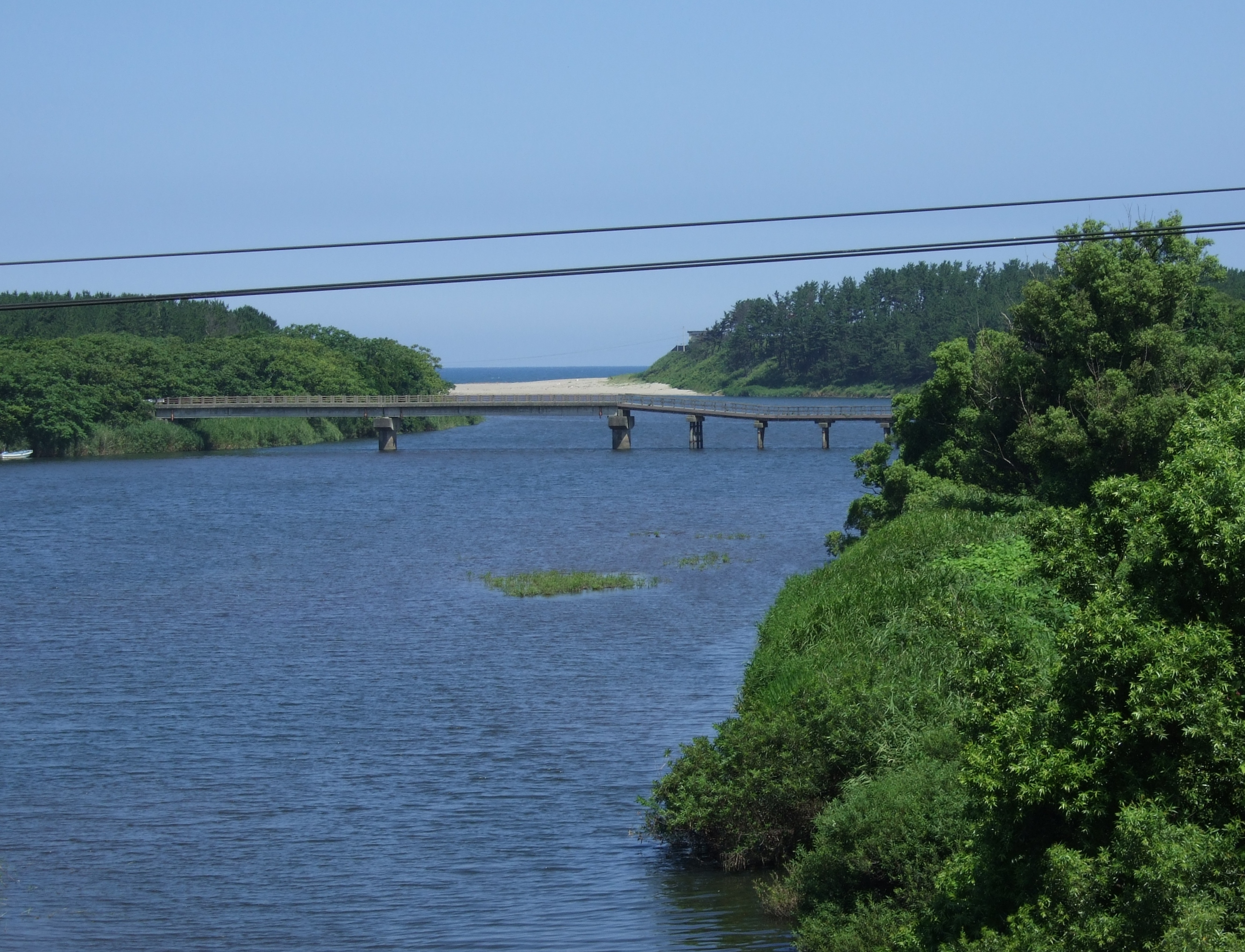
- Sakae Bridge in Yuza

- Flag Seal
- Location of Yuza in Yamagata Prefecture

- Location in Japan
- Coordinates: 39°00′53″N 139°54′32″E
- Country: Japan
- Region: Tōhoku
- Prefecture: Yamagata
- District: Akumi

Area
  - Total: 208.39 km^{2} (80.46 sq mi)

Population (March 31, 2023)
  - Total: 12,719
  - Density: 61.035/km^{2} (158.08/sq mi)
- Time zone: UTC+9 (Japan Standard Time)
- Phone number: 0234-72-3311
- City hall address: 211 Banchi, Yuza Aze Maizuru, Yuza-machi, Akumi-gun, Yamagata-ken 999-8301
- Website: Official website
- Symbols
- Flower: Arenaria
- Tree: Japanese Black Pine

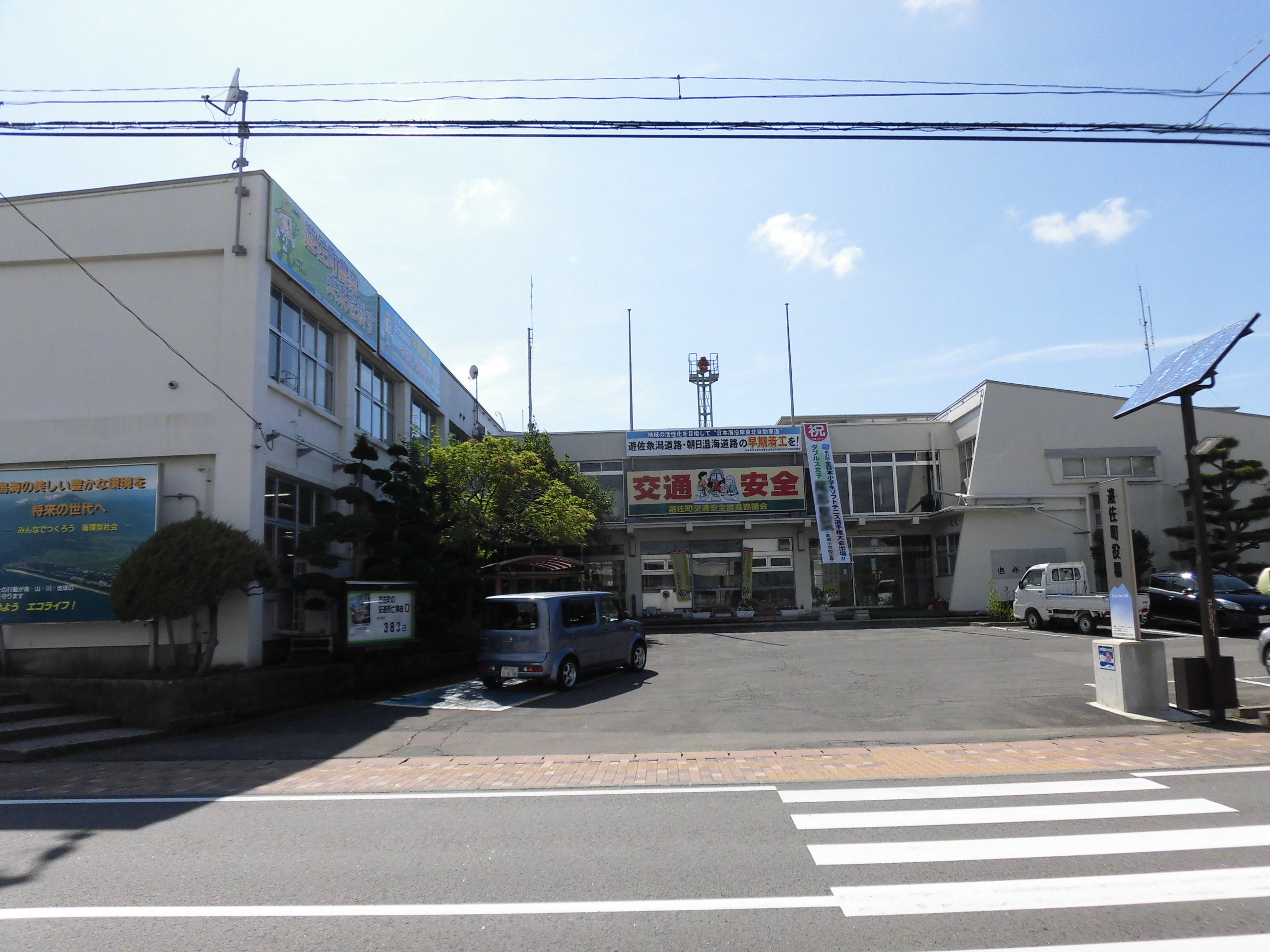
Yuza town hall

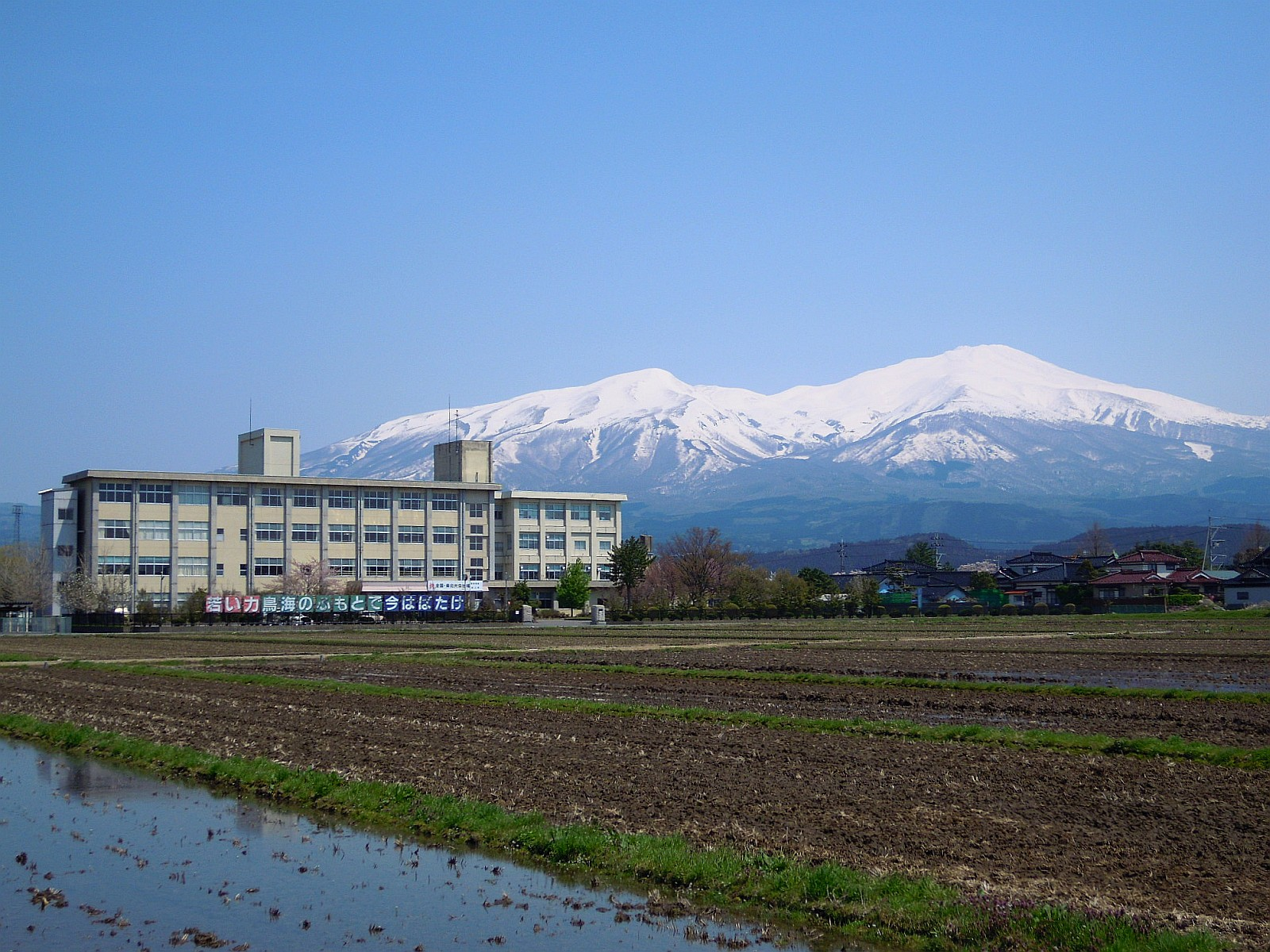
Yuza High School with Mount Chōkai in background

Yuza (遊佐町, Yuza-machi) is a town located in Yamagata Prefecture, Japan. As of 31 March 2023, the town had an estimated population of 12,719 in 4926 households, and a population density of 61 persons per km^{2}. The total area of the town is 208.38 square kilometres (80 sq mi).

== Geography ==
Yuza is located in the extreme northwest of Yamagata Prefecture, bordering on Akita Prefecture to the north and the Sea of Japan on the west. It is situated at the northern end of the Shōnai Plain, with the Gekkō River running across the town. Mount Chōkai, which has the second highest elevation in the Tohoku region, is on the northern border. Sandy beaches stretch along the coastline in the southern part of the town, whereas the northern coastline is more rugged due to reefs formed by lava flows from Mt. Chōkai. Part of the town is within the borders of the Chōkai Quasi-National Park.

=== Neighboring municipalities ===
Akita Prefecture

- Nikaho
- Yurihonjō

Yamagata Prefecture

- Sakata

=== Climate ===
Nakayama has a humid subtropical climate (Köppen climate classification Cfa) with large seasonal temperature differences, with warm to hot (and often humid) summers and cold (sometimes severely cold) winters. Precipitation is significant throughout the year, but is heaviest from August to October. The average annual temperature in Nakayama is 11.9 °C. The average annual rainfall is 1906 mm with September as the wettest month. The temperatures are highest on average in August, at around 25.1 °C, and lowest in January, at around 0.3 °C.

== Demographics ==
Per Japanese census data, the population of Yuza peaked around the year 1950 and has been declining steadily since. It is now less than it was a century ago.

Historical population
Year	Pop.	±% p.a.
1920	18,863	—
1930	19,556	+0.36%
1940	19,596	+0.02%
1950	25,726	+2.76%
1960	23,928	−0.72%
1970	21,224	−1.19%
1980	20,412	−0.39%
1990	19,705	−0.35%
2000	18,037	−0.88%
2010	15,480	−1.52%
2020	13,032	−1.71%

== History ==
The area of present-day Yuza was part of ancient Dewa Province. The area has been inhabited since prehistoric times, and the Koyamazaki Site containing the traces of a Jomon period settlement dating to more than 7500 years ago is a National Historic Site. During the late Heian period, the area was the location of Yuza-sō, a shōen landed estate, and during the Nanboku-chō period, Yuza clan were vassals of the Hatakeyama clan and served as shugodai in a number of provinces. In the Edo Period, the area became part of the domains of the Sakai clan of Shōnai Domain. After the start of the Meiji period, the area became part of Akumi District, Yamagata Prefecture. The village of Yuza was established on April 1, 1889, with the creation of the modern municipalities system. It was elevated to town status on April 1, 1941. On August 1, 1954, it absorbed the neighboring villages of Inagawa, Nishi-Yuza, Warabioka, Fukura, and Takase. In 2003, it joined discussions with regards to a possible merger with the neighboring city of Sakata; however, the merger discussions were closed on October 6, 2004, with Yuza electing to remain independent.

== Economy ==
The economy of Yuza is based on agriculture and commercial fishing.

== Education ==
Yuza has one public elementary school, one public middle school operated by the town government and one public high school operated by the Yamagata Prefectural Board of Education. The prefecture also operates one special education school for the handicapped.

== Transportation ==
=== Railway ===
East Japan Railway Company - Uetsu Main Line

- Yuza - Fukura - Mega

=== Highway ===
- Nihonkai-Tōhoku Expressway – Yuza Interchange
- National Route 7
- National Route 345

== Local attractions ==
- Chokaizan Omoimi Jinja
- Jūroku Rakan Iwa
- Koyamazaki Site, National Historic Site

== International relations ==
=== Sister cities ===
- Szolnok, Hungary
