= Japan National Route 345 =

Road in Japan

National Route 345
- 国道345号
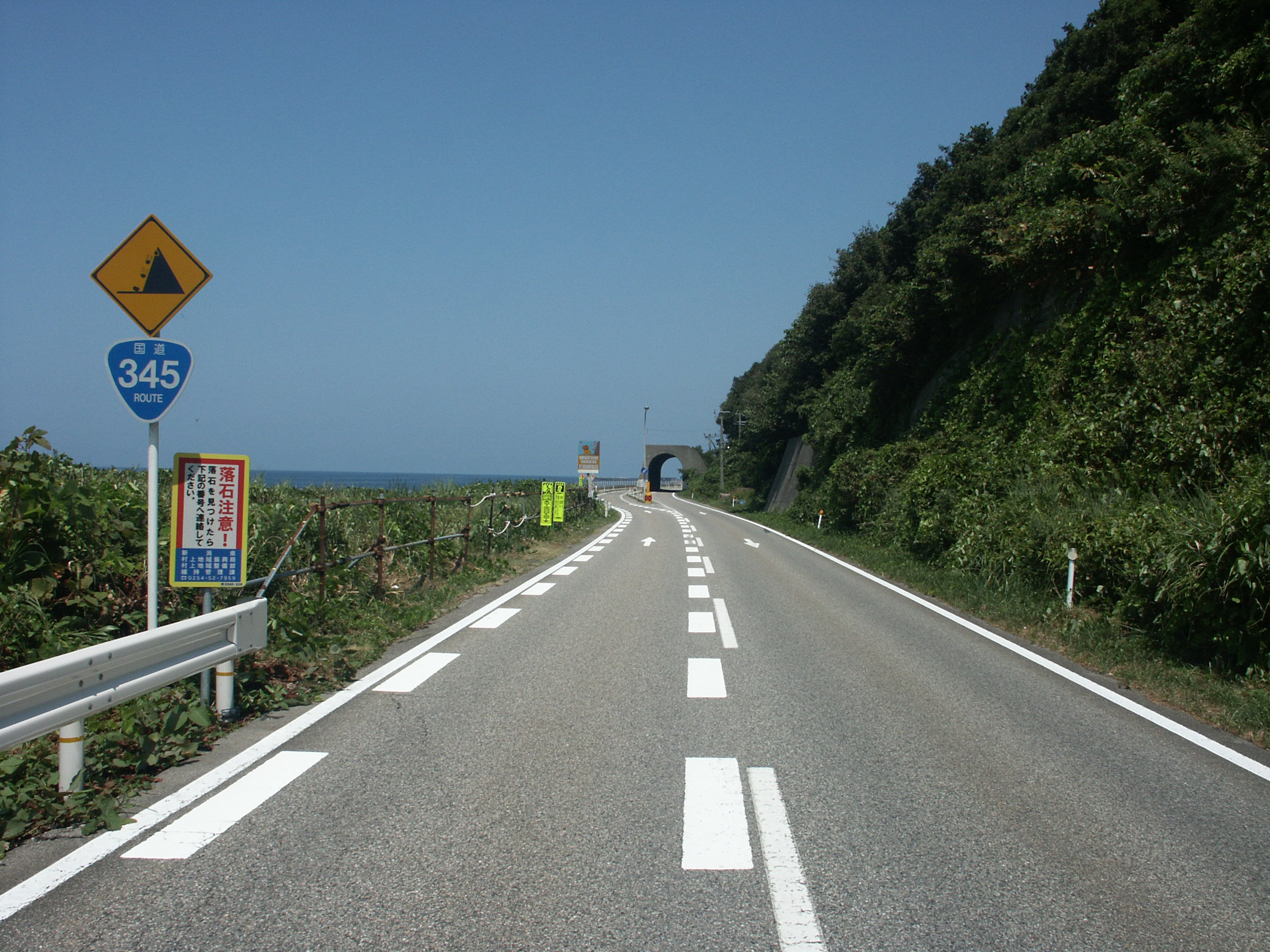

Route information
- Length: 212.0 km (131.7 mi)
- Existed: 1 April 1975–present

Major junctions
- South end: National Route 7 / National Route 8 / National Route 17 / National Route 113 / National Route 350 in Chūō-ku, Niigata
- National Route 112 National Route 47 National Route 344
- North end: National Route 7 in Yuza, Yamagata

Location
- Country: Japan

Highway system
- National highways of Japan; Expressways of Japan
← National Route 344	→ National Route 346

National Route 345 is a national highway of Japan connecting Chūō-ku, Niigata and Yuza, Yamagata in Japan, with a total length of 212.0 kilometers (131.7 mi).

== History ==
National Route 345 was established on 1 April 1975 as a route connecting Murakami, Niigata and Yuza, Yamagata.

On 19 June 2019, Route 345 was blocked by fallen debris in Murakami, Niigata because of the 2019 Yamagata earthquake.
